= List of awards and nominations received by Scissor Sisters =

Scissor Sisters awards and nominations
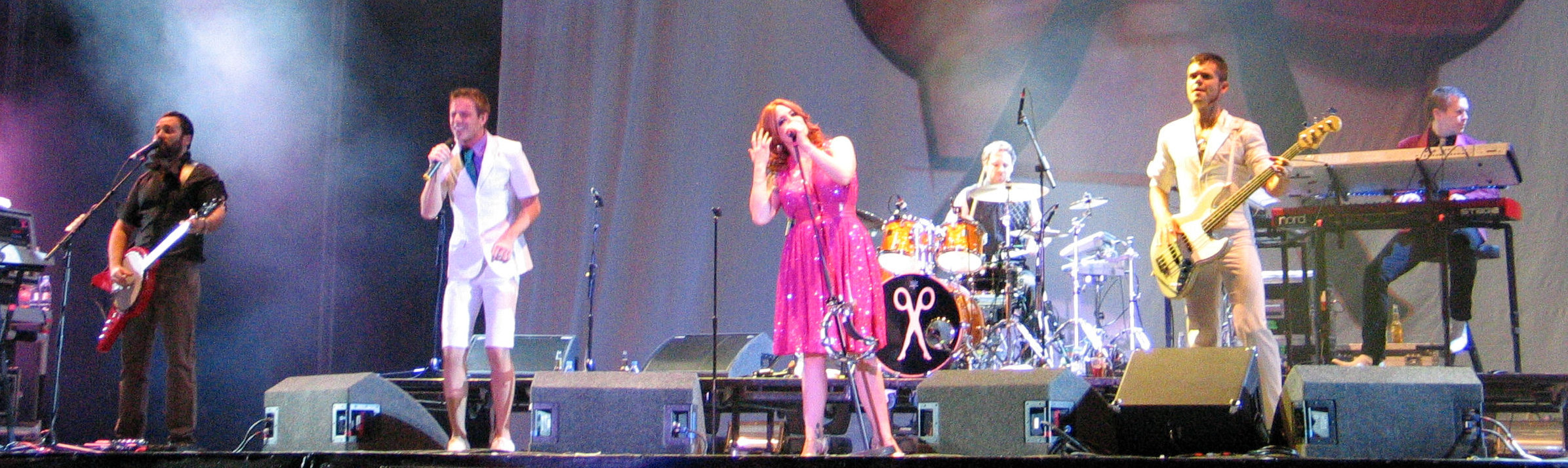
- Scissor Sisters performing in 2007
Award	Wins	Nominations
Bambi Prize	1	1
BRIT Awards	3	6
GLAAD Media Awards	3	4
Grammy Awards	0	1
International Dance Music Awards	1	4
Ivor Novello Awards	1	1
Meteor Music Awards	1	4
NME Awards	0	3
O Music Awards	0	1
Q Awards	0	5
UK Music Video Awards	1	3
- Totals
Awards won	17
Nominations	50

Scissor Sisters are an American band that formed in New York City in 2001. The group gained prominence after signing with the independent record label A Touch of Class and their songs "Electrobix" and "Comfortably Numb" (a Pink Floyd cover) were picked up by underground disc jockeys in nightclubs. They have released four studio albums: Scissor Sisters (2004), Ta-Dah (2006), Night Work (2010) and Magic Hour (2012). The group's remix EP, Remixed!, was released through A Touch of Class in September 2004 and the iTunes live EP iTunes Festival: London 2010 was released digitally in 2010. The band has also produced two video albums: We Are Scissor Sisters... And So Are You (2004) and Hurrah! A Year of Ta-Dah (2007).

Scissor Sisters was released through Polydor Records in February 2004 in the United Kingdom and through Universal Records in July 2004 in the United States. Singles from the album included "Laura", "Take Your Mama", "Mary" and "Filthy/Gorgeous". Scissor Sisters earned the group five awards, including three BRIT Awards (Best International Group, Best International Breakthrough Act, and Best International Album), a Bambi Prize (Shooting Star), and a GLAAD Media Award for Outstanding Music Artist. Ta-Dah was released through the same labels in September 2006. Singles included "I Don't Feel Like Dancin'", "Land of a Thousand Words", "She's My Man" and "Kiss You Off". The album earned the group a second GLAAD Media Award for Outstanding Music Artist and an Ivor Novello Award for Most Performed Work for "I Don't Feel Like Dancin'". Singles from Night Work included "Fire with Fire", "Any Which Way" and "Invisible Light". The music video for the latter song earned Scissor Sisters and director Roger Bellés three nominations from the UK Music Video Awards. Singles from Magic Hour included "Shady Love", "Only the Horses", "Baby Come Home" and "Let's Have a Kiki".

Other recognitions include the Gig of the Year award from Virgin Radio for their performance at the 2004 V Festival, and the inclusion of Scissor Sisters and Ta-Dah on Out's "100 Greatest, Gayest Albums" list. Scissor Sisters have also been recognized by the Grammy Awards (Best Dance Recording nomination for "Comfortably Numb"), International Dance Music Awards, Meteor Music Awards, NME Awards, O Music Awards and Q Awards. Overall, Scissor Sisters have received 17 awards from 50 nominations.

== Bambi Prize ==
Created in 1948, the Bambi is an annual television and media prize awarded by the German media company Hubert Burda Media. Scissor Sisters have received one award from one nomination.

Year	Nominated work	Award	Result	Ref.
2006	Scissor Sisters	Shooting Star	Won	

== Best Art Vinyl ==
The Best Art Vinyl Awards are yearly awards established in 2005 by Art Vinyl Ltd to celebrate the best album artwork of the past year.

Year	Nominated work	Award	Result	Ref.
2006	Ta-Dah	Best Vinyl Art	Nominated	

== Billboard Music Awards ==
The Billboard Music Awards honor artists for commercial performance in the U.S., based on record charts published by Billboard. The awards are based on sales data by Nielsen SoundScan and radio information by Nielsen Broadcast Data Systems. The award ceremony was held from 1990 to 2007, until its reintroduction in 2011.

Year	Nominee / work	Award	Result
2005	Scissor Sisters	Top Electronic Artist	Nominated
2005	Scissor Sisters	Top Electronic Album	Nominated
2006	Scissor Sisters	Top Electronic Album	Nominated
2006	Scissor Sisters	Top Electronic Artist	Nominated

== Brit Awards ==
The Brit Awards are the British Phonographic Industry's (BPI) annual pop music awards. Scissor Sisters have received three awards from six nominations.

Year	Nominated work	Award	Result	Ref.
2005	Scissor Sisters	International Breakthrough Act	Won	
2005	Scissor Sisters	International Group	Won	
2005	Scissor Sisters	International Album	Won	
2007	Scissor Sisters	International Group	Nominated	
2007	Ta-Dah	International Album	Nominated	
2010	"Take Your Mama"	Live Performance of 30 Years	Nominated	

== GAFFA Awards (Denmark) ==
Delivered since 1991. The GAFFA Awards (Danish: GAFFA Prisen) are a Danish award that rewards popular music awarded by the magazine of the same name.

Year	Nominated work	Award	Result	Ref.
2004	Scissor Sisters	Best Foreign New Act	Nominated	
2004	"Take Your Mama"	Best Foreign Hit	Nominated	

== GLAAD Media Awards ==
The GLAAD Media Awards were created in 1990 by the Gay & Lesbian Alliance Against Defamation (GLAAD) to recognize and honor the mainstream media for their fair, accurate and inclusive representations of the LGBT community. Scissor Sisters have received three awards from four nominations.

Year	Nominated work	Award	Result	Ref.
2005	Scissor Sisters (Scissor Sisters)	Outstanding Music Artist	Won	
2007	Scissor Sisters (Ta-Dah)	Outstanding Music Artist	Won	
2011	Scissor Sisters (Night Work)	Outstanding Music Artist	Won	
2013	Scissor Sisters (Magic Hour)	Outstanding Music Artist	Nominated	

== Grammy Awards ==
The Grammy Awards are awarded annually by the National Academy of Recording Arts and Sciences of the United States for outstanding achievements in the record industry. Often considered the highest music honor, the awards were established in 1958. Scissor Sisters have been nominated once.

Year	Nominated work	Award	Result	Ref.
2005	"Comfortably Numb"	Best Dance Recording	Nominated	

== Groovevolt Music and Fashion Awards ==
Year	Nominee / work	Award	Result	Ref.
2006	Themselves	UberArtist	Nominated	

== International Dance Music Awards ==
The International Dance Music Awards, which take place during the annual Winter Music Conference, recognize achievements in the electronic dance music industry. Scissor Sisters have received one award from four nominations.

Year	Nominated work	Award	Result	Ref.
2005	Scissor Sisters	Best New Dance Artist Group	Won	
2005	Scissor Sisters	Best Dance Artist Group	Nominated	
2007	"I Don't Feel Like Dancin'"	Best Alternative/Rock Dance Track	Nominated	
2008	"She's My Man"	Best Dance Music Video	Nominated	

== Ivor Novello Awards ==
The Ivor Novello Awards, named after the Cardiff-born entertainer Ivor Novello, are awards for songwriting and composing. Scissor Sisters have received one award from one nomination.

Year	Nominated work	Award	Result	Ref.
2007	"I Don't Feel Like Dancin'"	Most Performed Work	Won	

== New York Music Awards ==
Year	Nominated work	Award	Result	Ref.
2011	Themselves	Best Alternative Band	Won	
2011	Themselves	Best Club Band	Won	
2011	Jake Shears	Best Alternative Frontperson	Won	
2011	Jake Shears	Best Male Dance Artist	Won	
2011	Night Work	Best Dance Album	Won	

== Meteor Music Awards ==
The Meteor Music Awards are distributed by MCD Productions and are the national music awards of Ireland. Scissor Sisters have received one award from four nominations.

Year	Nominated work	Award	Result	Ref.
2005	Scissor Sisters	Best International Group	Nominated	
2005	Scissor Sisters	Best International Album	Nominated	
2006	Scissor Sisters at Lansdowne Road	Best Live Performance	Nominated	
2007	Scissor Sisters	Best International Group	Won	

== NME Awards ==
The NME Awards are an annual music awards show founded by the music magazine NME. Scissor Sisters have received three nominations.

Year	Nominated work	Award	Result	Ref.
2005	Scissor Sisters	Best International Band	Nominated	
2005	Scissor Sisters	Best Album	Nominated	
2005	We Are Scissor Sisters... And So Are You	Best Music DVD	Nominated	

== O Music Awards ==
The O Music Awards, hosted by MTV, honor "artists, innovators and fans impacting digital music culture". Scissor Sisters have been nominated once.

Year	Nominated work	Award	Result	Ref.
2011	"Invisible Light"	Too Much Ass for TV	Nominated	

== Q Awards ==
The Q Awards are the UK's annual pop music awards run by the music magazine Q magazine to honor musical excellence. Winners are voted by readers of Q. Scissor Sisters have received five nominations.

Year	Nominated work	Award	Result	Ref.
2004	Scissor Sisters	Best Album	Nominated	
2004	Scissor Sisters	Best Producer	Nominated	
2004	"Laura"	Best Video	Nominated	
2006	"I Don't Feel Like Dancin'"	Best Track	Nominated	
2006	"I Don't Feel Like Dancin'"	Best Video	Nominated	

== RTHK International Pop Poll Awards ==
Year	Nominated work	Award	Result	Ref.
2007	"I Don't Feel Like Dancin'"	Top Ten International Gold Songs	Nominated	

== The Record of the Year ==
The Record of the Year was an award voted by the UK public. The award began in 1998, and was televised on ITV before being dropped in 2006 after disagreements over the phone voting element. Since then it has been an online poll, administered through the Record of the Year website. In 2013, it was axed, signaling the end of the award.

Year	Nominated work	Award	Result	Ref.
2004	"Laura"	Record of the Year	Nominated	
2006	"I Don't Feel Like Dancin'"	Record of the Year	Nominated	

== UK Festival Awards ==
Year	Nominee / work	Award	Result	Ref.
2004	Jake Shears	Most Memorable Moment	Nominated	
2005	Scissor Sisters	Festival Pop Act	Won	
2006	Scissor Sisters	Festival Pop Act	Nominated	
2006	Scissor Sisters	Most Memorable Moment	Nominated	
2010	Scissor Sisters	Feel-Good Act of the Summer	Nominated	

== UK Music Video Awards ==
The UK Music Video Awards recognize "creativity and technical excellence" in music videos made within the United Kingdom. The music video for "Invisible Light" earned the group and director Roger Bellés an award for Best Art Direction and Design in a Video. Scissor Sisters have received one award from three nominations.

Year	Nominated work	Award	Result	Ref.
2011	"Invisible Light"	Best Pop Video – UK	Nominated	
2011	"Invisible Light"	Best Art Direction and Design in a Video	Won	
2011	"Invisible Light"	Best Styling in a Video	Nominated	

== Virgin Media Music Awards ==
The Virgin Media Music Awards was the annual music awards run by Virgin Media. The winners was declared on its official site "Virgin Media".

Year	Nominee / work	Award	Result
2004	Themselves	Funniest Act	Nominated
2004	Themselves	Most Innovative Act	Nominated
2004	"Comfortably Numb"	Best Cover Version	Won
2006	Ta-Dah	Best Album	Nominated
2010	Themselves	Best Group	Nominated

== Other recognitions ==
- 2004 – Gay members of the band, Jake Shears, Babydaddy, and Del Marquis, were part of Out's "List of the 100 Most Intriguing Gay People of the Year"
- 2004 – For their performance at the 2004 V Festival, Scissor Sisters won the "Gig of the Year" award from Virgin Radio
- 2006 – Scissor Sisters was included in Robert Dimery's book, 1001 Albums You Must Hear Before You Die
- 2008 – Out magazine ranked Scissor Sisters number 26 and Ta-Dah number 81 on their "100 Greatest, Gayest Albums" list
