= Scissor Sisters discography =

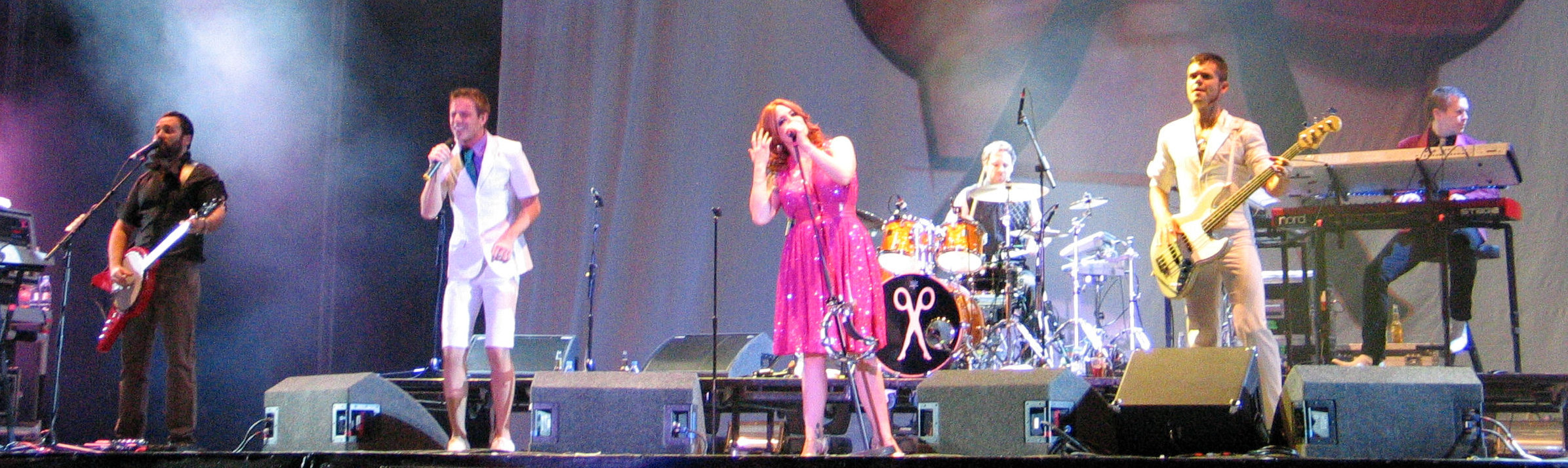
- Scissor Sisters performing in 2007
- Studio albums: 4
- Extended plays: 2
- Singles: 18
- Video albums: 2
- Music videos: 17

The discography of Scissor Sisters, an American pop group, consists of four studio albums, two extended plays, eighteen singles, two video albums and seventeen music videos. The band was formed in New York City in 2001 by Babydaddy, Jake Shears, Ana Matronic, Del Marquis and Paddy Boom, who was later replaced by Randy Real. After signing a contract with independent record label A Touch of Class in 2002, Scissor Sisters released their debut single "Electrobix". The critical success of its B-side, a cover version of Pink Floyd's song "Comfortably Numb", brought the group to the attention of Polydor Records, which signed them in 2003.

The band then began to work on their debut studio album, Scissor Sisters, which was released in February 2004. It peaked at number one in the United Kingdom and performed well internationally. The album was certified nine times platinum by the British Phonographic Industry (BPI), becoming the best-selling album of 2004 in the UK, and has sold over seven million copies worldwide. Scissor Sisters spawned five singles; "Comfortably Numb" and "Filthy/Gorgeous" became top ten hits in the UK, while "Laura", "Take Your Mama" and "Mary" all reached the top 20 in the UK. The band released their second studio album, Ta-Dah, in September 2006. Topping the charts in numerous countries, including the UK and Ireland, the album was a commercial success. Its lead single, "I Don't Feel Like Dancin'", peaked at number one in the UK and became an international top ten hit. The album produced three more singles: "Land of a Thousand Words", "She's My Man" and "Kiss You Off".

Scissor Sisters worked extensively with producer Stuart Price in recording their third studio album, Night Work, which was released in June 2010. The album reached number two in the UK and number three on the US Dance/Electronic Albums chart. Three singles were released: "Fire with Fire", which topped the US Hot Dance Club Songs chart, "Any Which Way" and "Invisible Light". The band's fourth studio album, Magic Hour, was followed in May 2012. It peaked at number one on the US Dance/Electronic Albums and number four in the UK. The first single from the album, "Only the Horses", charted highly in several countries. It was followed by "Baby Come Home" and "Let's Have a Kiki", the latter of which reached the number-one spot on the US Hot Dance Club Songs.

== Studio albums ==
List of studio albums, with selected chart positions, sales figures and certifications
Title	Album details	Peak chart positions										Sales	Certifications
Title	Album details	US	AUS	AUT	BEL	DEN	GER	IRE	NLD	SWI	UK	Sales	Certifications
Scissor Sisters	Released: July 27, 2004 (US); Labels: Universal, Polydor; Formats: CD, LP, digital download	102	7	75	81	18	—	1	67	—	1	UK: 2,760,000^{[B]}	ARIA: Platinum; BPI: 9× Platinum; IFPI DEN: Gold; IRMA: 5× Platinum
Ta-Dah	Released: September 26, 2006 (US); Labels: Universal, Polydor; Formats: CD, LP, digital download	19	1	3	7	6	6	1	11	5	1	UK: 1,458,481^{[C]}	ARIA: Platinum; BEA: Gold; BPI: 5× Platinum; BVMI: Gold; IFPI AUT: Platinum; IFPI DEN: Platinum; IFPI SWI: Gold; IRMA: 2× Platinum
Night Work	Released: June 29, 2010 (US); Labels: Universal, Polydor; Formats: CD, LP, digital download	18	10	36	38	36	29	11	29	12	2	UK: 157,343^{[D]}	BPI: Gold
Magic Hour	Released: May 29, 2012 (US); Labels: Universal, Polydor; Formats: CD, LP, digital download	35	27	—	72	—	—	15	68	62	4		
"—" denotes items which were not released in that country or failed to chart.

== Live albums ==
List of live albums
Title	Details
It's 10PM... Do You Know Where Your Sisters Are? Live from the O2, London	Released: May 22, 2026; Label: Live Here Now; Recorded: May 23, 2025; Formats: CD, red vinyl LP, digital download

== Extended plays ==
List of extended plays
Title	Details
Remixed!	Released: September 21, 2004 (US); Label: A Touch of Class; Formats: CD, digital download
iTunes Festival: London 2010	Released: July 10, 2010 (UK); Label: Polydor; Format: Digital download

== Singles ==
List of singles, with selected chart positions and certifications, showing year released and album name
Title	Year	Peak chart positions										Certifications	Album
Title	Year	US Dance	AUS	AUT	BEL (FL)	GER	IRE	ITA	NLD	SWE	UK	Certifications	Album
"Electrobix"	2002	—	—	—	—	—	—	—	—	—	—		Non-album single
"Laura"	2003	—	66	—	—	—	17	—	—	—	12	BPI: Silver	Scissor Sisters
"Comfortably Numb"	2004	—	73	—	39	97	30	—	42	27	10		Scissor Sisters
"Take Your Mama"	2004	—	40	—	—	99	25	—	52	53	17	BPI: Gold	Scissor Sisters
"Mary"	2004	—	—	—	—	—	32	—	—	—	14		Scissor Sisters
"Filthy/Gorgeous"	2005	1	29	—	—	—	13	—	—	—	5	BPI: Silver	Scissor Sisters
"I Don't Feel Like Dancin'"	2006	—	1	1	1	1	2	4	2	1	1	ARIA: Platinum; BEA: Gold; BPI: 2× Platinum; BVMI: Platinum; FIMI: Gold; GLF: Platinum	Ta-Dah
"Land of a Thousand Words"	2006	—	—	40	54	50	44	18	45	—	19		Ta-Dah
"She's My Man"	2007	—	39	55	53	57	—	23	46	39	29		Ta-Dah
"Kiss You Off"	2007	—	—	—	—	—	—	—	—	—	43		Ta-Dah
"Fire with Fire"	2010	1	—	24	48	51	16	15	51	36	11		Night Work
"Any Which Way"	2010	—	—	—	—	—	—	—	—	—	81		Night Work
"Invisible Light"	2010	—	—	—	—	—	—	—	—	—	—		Night Work
"Only the Horses"	2012	5	—	—	37	—	32	5	—	—	12	FIMI: Platinum	Magic Hour
"Baby Come Home"	2012	—	—	—	72	—	—	36	—	—	—		Magic Hour
"Let's Have a Kiki"	2012	1	—	—	—	—	—	—	—	—	119		Magic Hour
"Swerlk" (with MNDR)	2017	—	—	—	—	—	—	—	—	—	—		Non-album single
"Magnifique"	2025	—	—	—	—	—	—	—	—	—	—		Scissor Sisters Deluxe
"—" denotes items which were not released in that country or failed to chart.

== Other charted songs ==
List of songs, with selected chart positions, showing year charted and album name
Title	Year	Peak chart positions	Album
Title	Year	UK	Album
"I Can't Decide"	2007	64	Ta-Dah

== Other appearances ==
List of guest appearances, showing year released and album name
Title	Year	Album
"Do the Strand"	2009	War Child Presents Heroes
"Isn't It Strange"	2010	Shrek Forever After: Music from the Motion Picture

== Video albums ==
List of video albums, with selected chart positions and certifications
Title	Album details	Peak chart positions		Certifications
Title	Album details	US Video	AUS	Certifications
We Are Scissor Sisters... And So Are You	Released: January 11, 2005 (US); Labels: Universal, Polydor; Format: DVD	6	23	BPI: Platinum
Hurrah! A Year of Ta-Dah	Released: December 4, 2007 (US); Labels: Universal, Polydor; Format: CD+DVD, DVD	2	—	
"—" denotes items which failed to chart.

== Music videos ==
List of music videos, showing year released and director
Title	Year	Director(s)
"Laura" (version one)	2003	AlexandLiane
"Comfortably Numb"	2004	Chris Hopewell
"Take Your Mama"	2004	Andy Soup
"Laura" (version two)	2004	Andy Soup
"Mary"	2004	Julien Temple
"Filthy/Gorgeous"	2005	John Cameron Mitchell
"I Don't Feel Like Dancin'"	2006	Andy Soup
"Land of a Thousand Words"	2006	National Television
"She's My Man"	2007	Nagi Noda
"Kiss You Off"	2007	Robert Hales
"Fire With Fire"	2010	Philip Andelman
"Any Which Way"	2010	Ace Norton
"Invisible Light"	2010	Nicolás Méndez
"Shady Love"	2012	Hiro Murai
"Only the Horses"	2012	Lorenzo Fonda
"Baby Come Home"	2012	Lorenzo Fonda
"Let's Have a Kiki"	2012	Vern Moen

== See also ==
- List of songs recorded by Scissor Sisters

== Notes ==
- A Worldwide sales figures for Scissor Sisters as of September 2010.
- B United Kingdom sales figures for Scissor Sisters as of October 2018.
- C United Kingdom sales figures for Ta-Dah as of June 2012.
- D United Kingdom sales figures for Night Work as of June 2012.
