= List of songs recorded by Scissor Sisters =

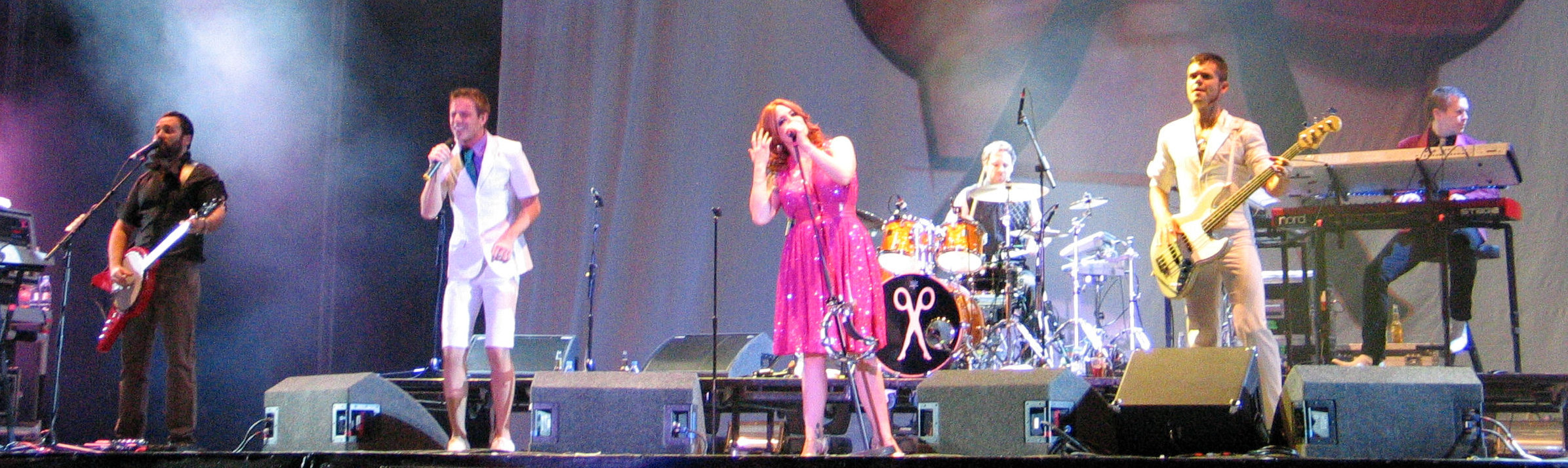
Scissor Sisters have recorded songs for four studio albums.

American pop music group Scissor Sisters have recorded songs for four studio albums. The group was founded in 2001 by Babydaddy (Scott Hoffman), Jake Shears (Jason Sellards), Ana Matronic (Ana Lynch), Del Marquis (Derek Gruen) and Paddy Boom (Patrick Seacor). After signing a contract with independent record label A Touch of Class in 2002, Scissor Sisters released their debut single "Electrobix". The critical success of its B-side, a cover version of Pink Floyd's rock song "Comfortably Numb", brought the group to the attention of Polydor Records, which signed them in 2003.

Scissor Sisters then began to work on their self-titled debut studio album, which was released in 2004. Babydaddy and Shears wrote almost all of its songs, and would continue to do so for their later albums. Ana Matronic co-wrote the songs "Filthy/Gorgeous" and "Tits on the Radio", while Del Marquis contributed to "Better Luck" and "Music Is the Victim". The band released their second studio album Ta-Dah in 2006. The album's lead single "I Don't Feel Like Dancin'" was co-written with Elton John. It reached number one in the United Kingdom, and won an Ivor Novello Award for "Most Performed Work". Scissor Sisters also collaborated on two songs, "Lights" and "Paul McCartney", with Carlos Alomar. In 2007, an unofficial demo album, K-Mart Disco, was released by Atom Records. It consisted of songs recorded by the band prior to the release of their debut album.

Night Work, the band's third studio album, was released in 2010. The first single released from Night Work was "Fire with Fire", which Babydaddy and Shears wrote in collaboration with Stuart Price. Price co-wrote eight other songs for the album, including the singles "Any Which Way" and "Invisible Light". American singer Santigold co-wrote and provided backing vocals to the song "Running Out". Scissor Sisters' fourth studio album Magic Hour followed in 2012. The album's lead single, "Only the Horses", was co-written by Babydaddy, Shears, Alex Ridha and Amanda Ghost. Scissor Sisters also collaborated with John Legend on the album's second single "Baby Come Home"; they co-wrote "Inevitable" with Pharrell Williams and "Shady Love" with Azealia Banks.

== Songs ==
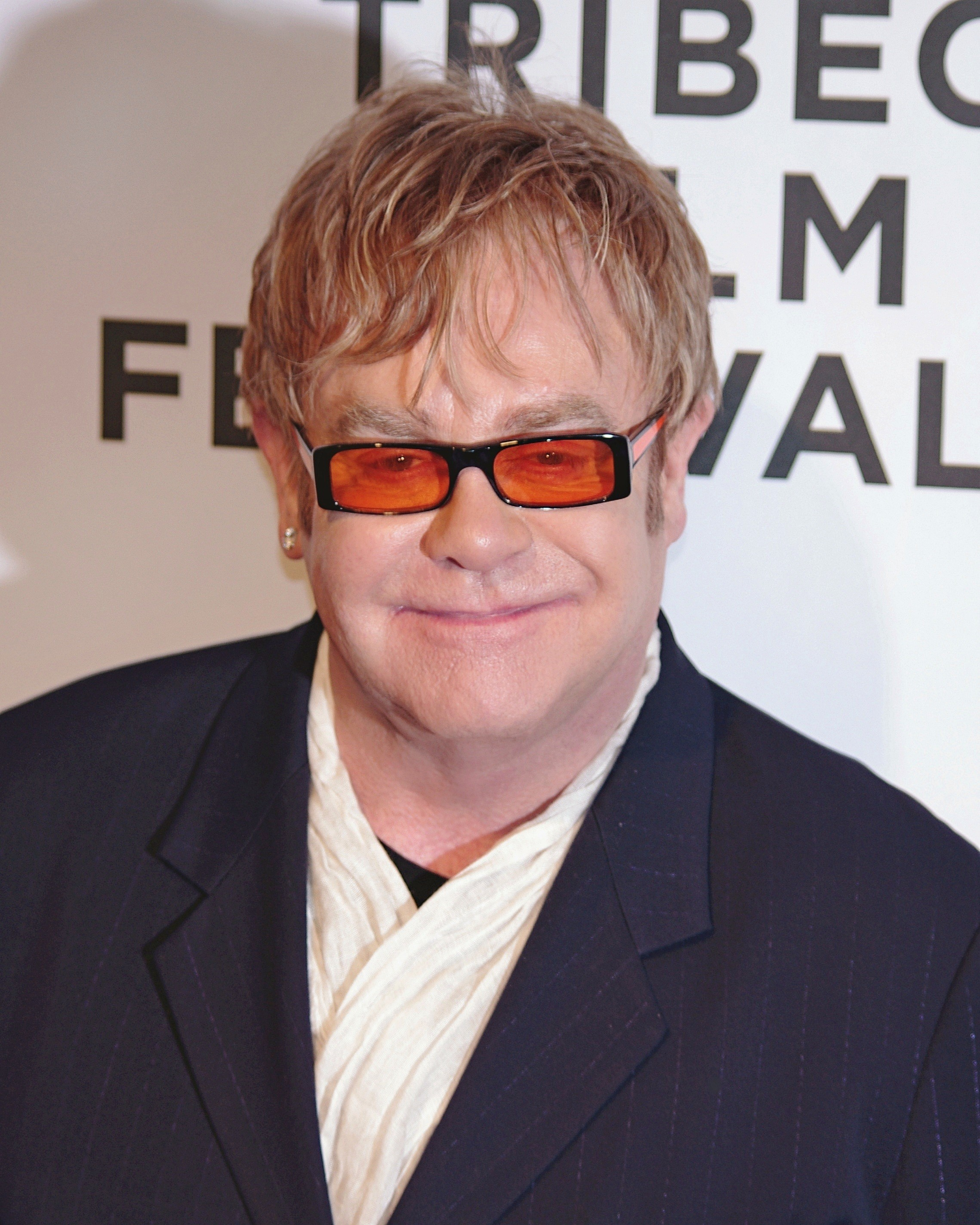
Elton John (pictured) co-wrote the songs "I Don't Feel Like Dancin'" and "Intermission" with Scissor Sisters for their second studio album Ta-Dah.

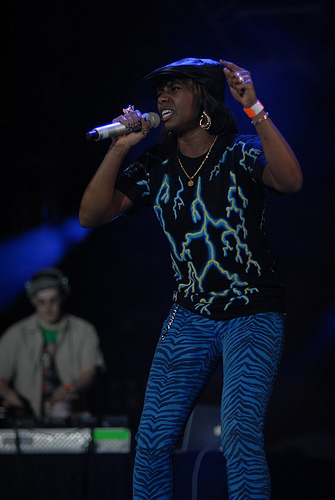
American singer Santigold (pictured) co-wrote and contributed backing vocals to the song "Running Out" for the Scissor Sisters album Night Work.

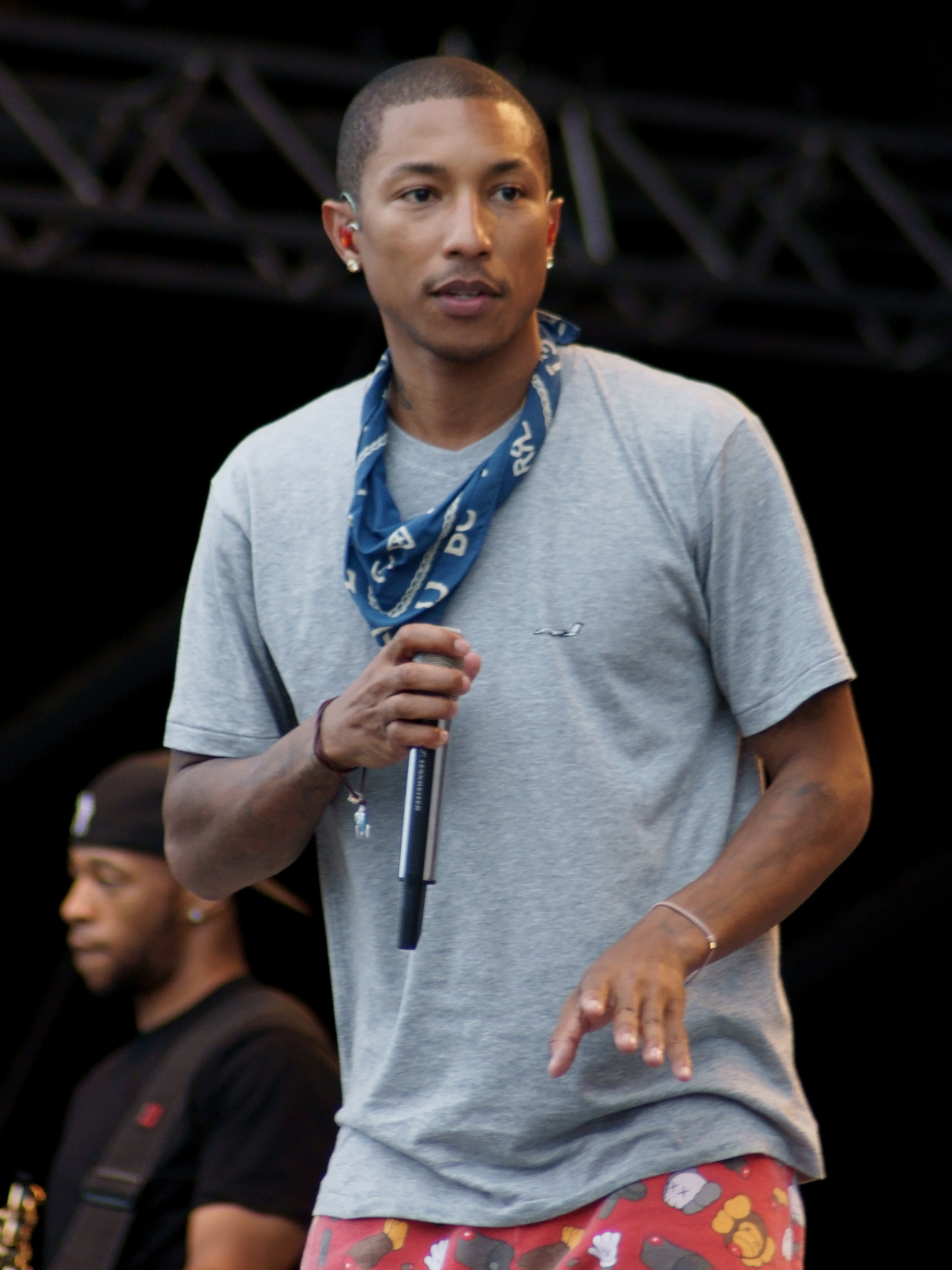
Pharrell Williams (pictured) co-wrote and produced the song "Inevitable" with Scissor Sisters for their fourth studio album Magic Hour.

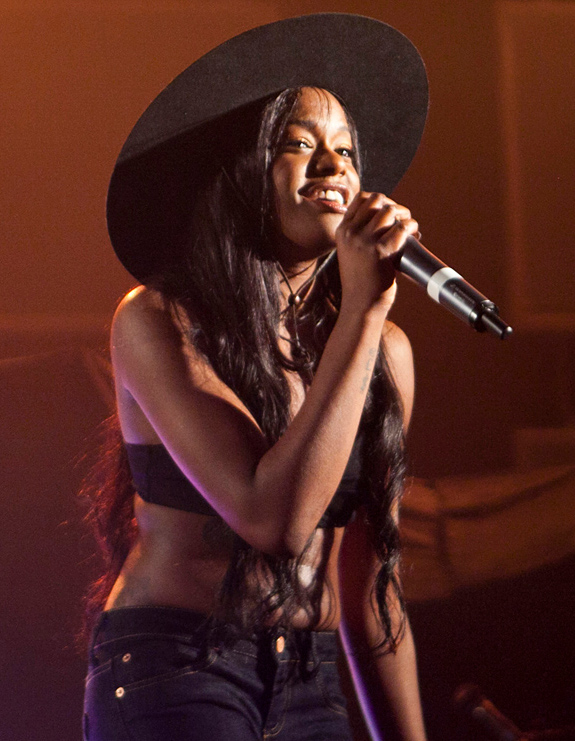
American singer Azealia Banks (pictured) co-wrote the song "Shady Love" for the band's album Magic Hour.

Key
†	Indicates single release

All songs credited to Scissor Sisters, except where noted.
Song	Writer(s)	Release	Year	Ref.
"Almost Sorry"	Scott Hoffman; Jason Sellards; Paul Williams	Ta-Dah	2006	
"Ambition"	Scott Hoffman; Jason Sellards	Ta-Dah	2006	
"Any Which Way" †	Scott Hoffman; Jason Sellards; Stuart Price; Ana Lynch	Night Work	2010	
"Available (For You)"	Scott Hoffman; Jason Sellards; Ana Lynch	"Laura"	2003	
"Baby Come Home" †	Scott Hoffman; Jason Sellards; John Stephens; Ana Lynch	Magic Hour	2012	
"Backwoods Discotheque, Pt. II"	Scott Hoffman; Jason Sellards	"Take Your Mama"	2004	
"Bad Shit" (Demo)	Unknown	"Kiss You Off"	2007	
"Best in Me"	Scott Hoffman; Jason Sellards; Alex Ridha	Magic Hour	2012	
"Better Luck"	Scott Hoffman; Jason Sellards; Derek Gruen	Scissor Sisters	2004	
"Bicycling with the Devil"	Unknown	K-Mart Disco	2004	
"Borrowed Time"	Scott Hoffman; Jason Sellards	"Laura"	2004	
"Comfortably Numb" †	David Gilmour; Roger Waters	Scissor Sisters	2004	
"Contact High" (Demo)	Scott Hoffman; Jason Sellards; Ana Lynch	Ta-Dah	2006	
"Doctor (I'm Only Seeking Dark)"	Scott Hoffman; Jason Sellards	K-Mart Disco	2007	
"Do the Strand"	Bryan Ferry	War Child Presents Heroes	2009	
"Electrobix" †	Scott Hoffman; Jason Sellards	"Electrobix"	2003	
"Everybody Wants the Same Thing"	Scott Hoffman; Jason Sellards; Patrick Seacor; Paul Leschen; Ana Lynch	Ta-Dah	2006	
"Filthy/Gorgeous" †	Scott Hoffman; Jason Sellards; Ana Lynch	Scissor Sisters	2004	
"Fire with Fire" †	Scott Hoffman; Jason Sellards; Stuart Price	Night Work	2010	
"F*** Yeah"	Scott Hoffman; Jason Sellards	Magic Hour	2012	
"Get It Get It"	Scott Hoffman; Jason Sellards	Scissor Sisters	2004	
"Hair Baby"	Scott Hoffman; Jason Sellards; Derek Gruen; Carlos Alomar	Ta-Dah	2006	
"Harder You Get"	Scott Hoffman; Jason Sellards; Stuart Price	Night Work	2010	
"I Can't Decide"	Scott Hoffman; Jason Sellards	Ta-Dah	2006	
"I Don't Feel Like Dancin'" †	Scott Hoffman; Jason Sellards; Elton John	Ta-Dah	2006	
"Inevitable"	Scott Hoffman; Jason Sellards; Pharrell Williams	Magic Hour	2012	
"Intermission"	Scott Hoffman; Jason Sellards; Elton John	Ta-Dah	2006	
"Invisible Light" †	Scott Hoffman; Jason Sellards; Ana Lynch; Stuart Price	Night Work	2010	
"It Can't Come Quickly Enough"	Scott Hoffman; Jason Sellards	Scissor Sisters	2004	
"Keep Your Shoes On"	Scott Hoffman; Jason Sellards; Alex Ridha	Magic Hour	2012	
"Kiss You Off" †	Scott Hoffman; Jason Sellards; Ana Lynch	Ta-Dah	2006	
"Land of a Thousand Words" †	Scott Hoffman; Jason Sellards	Ta-Dah	2006	
"Laura" †	Scott Hoffman; Jason Sellards	Scissor Sisters	2004	
"Let's Have a Kiki" †	Scott Hoffman; Jason Sellards; Ana Lynch	Magic Hour	2012	
"Lights"	Scott Hoffman; Jason Sellards; Carlos Alomar	Ta-Dah	2006	
"Lovers in the Backseat"	Scott Hoffman; Jason Sellards	Scissor Sisters	2004	
"Making Ladies"	Scott Hoffman; Jason Sellards	Ta-Dah	2006	
"Mary" †	Scott Hoffman; Jason Sellards	Scissor Sisters	2004	
"Might Tell You Tonight"	Scott Hoffman; Jason Sellards	Ta-Dah	2006	
"Monkey Baby"	Unknown	K-Mart Disco	2007	
"Music Is the Victim"	Scott Hoffman; Jason Sellards; Derek Gruen	Scissor Sisters	2004	
"Night Life"	Scott Hoffman; Jason Sellards; Ana Lynch; Derek Gruen; Stuart Price	Night Work	2010	
"Night Work"	Scott Hoffman; Jason Sellards; Derek Gruen; Stuart Price	Night Work	2010	
"Only the Horses" †	Scott Hoffman; Jason Sellards; Alex Ridha; Amanda Ghost	Magic Hour	2012	
"Ooh"	Scott Hoffman; Jason Sellards; Derek Gruen	Ta-Dah	2006	
"The Other Side"	Scott Hoffman; Jason Sellards; John "JJ" Garden	Ta-Dah	2006	
"Paul McCartney"	Scott Hoffman; Jason Sellards; Derek Gruen; Carlos Alomar	Ta-Dah	2006	
"Return to Oz"	Scott Hoffman; Jason Sellards	Scissor Sisters	2004	
"Running Out"	Scott Hoffman; Jason Sellards; Santi White	Night Work	2010	
"San Luis Obispo"	Scott Hoffman; Jason Sellards	Magic Hour	2012	
"The Secret Life of Letters"	Jason Sellards; Scott Hoffman; Joan Wasser	Magic Hour	2012	
"Self Control"	Scott Hoffman; Jason Sellards; Ana Lynch	Magic Hour	2012	
"Sex and Violence"	Scott Hoffman; Jason Sellards	Night Work	2010	
"Sex Exciter"	Scott Hoffman; Jason Sellards; Alison Goldfrapp	"Any Which Way"	2010	
"Shady Love"^{[a]}	Scott Hoffman; Jason Sellards; Alex Ridha; Azealia Banks	Magic Hour	2012	
"She's My Man" †	Scott Hoffman; Jason Sellards	Ta-Dah	2006	
"Skin This Cat"	Scott Hoffman; Jason Sellards; Ana Lynch	Night Work	2010	
"Skin Tight"	Scott Hoffman; Jason Sellards; Stuart Price	Night Work	2010	
"The Skins"	Scott Hoffman; Jason Sellards	Scissor Sisters	2004	
"Someone to Touch"	Scott Hoffman; Jason Sellards	K-Mart Disco	2007	
"Something Like This"	Scott Hoffman; Jason Sellards	Night Work	2010	
"Somewhere"	Scott Hoffman; Jason Sellards; Alex Ridha	Magic Hour	2012	
"Step Aside for the Man"	Scott Hoffman; Jason Sellards	K-Mart Disco	2007	
"Swerlk" †	Amanda Warner; Scott Hoffman; Peter Wade Keusch; Jason Sellards; Ana Lynch; Derek Gruen	SWERLK single WonderSound Records	2017	
"Take Your Mama" †	Scott Hoffman; Jason Sellards	Scissor Sisters	2004	
"Tits on the Radio"	Scott Hoffman; Jason Sellards; Ana Lynch	Scissor Sisters	2004	
"Transistor"	Scott Hoffman; Jason Sellards	Ta-Dah	2006	
"Us and Them"	Unknown	K-Mart Disco	2007	
"Whole New Way"	Scott Hoffman; Jason Sellards; Stuart Price	Night Work	2010	
"Year of Living Dangerously"	Scott Hoffman; Jason Sellards; Alex Ridha; Thomas Pentz	Magic Hour	2012	

== Notes ==
- A "Shady Love" is credited to Scissor Sisters vs. Krystal Pepsy.
