= K-Mart Disco =

Demo album by Scissor Sisters
- Released: February 15, 2007
- Genre: Glam rock, pop rock
- Length: 72:14
- Label: Atom Records
- Producer: Scissor Sisters

Scissor Sisters chronology
| Ta-Dah (2006) | K-Mart Disco (2007) | Night Work (2010) |

K-Mart Disco is an unofficial demo album by American band Scissor Sisters, released internationally in 2007. It features most of the tracks from their initial demo album as well as other tracks never released on their studio albums or singles, including their first release "Electrobix". The cover is a parody of the classic Pink Floyd album The Dark Side of the Moon.

Jake Shears has stated through the band's official Twitter that the band had nothing to do with this release, nor did he like the title.

== Track listing ==
The tracks featured on the K-Mart Disco include original versions of the Scissor Sisters' original songs and other tracks initially released on the Scissor Sisters' demo album, including those never featured in other releases.

1. "Intro" – 0:41
2. "Bicycling with the Devil" – 3:51
3. "Filthy Gorgeous" (original version) – 5:48
4. "Backwoods Discotheque Pt. 1" – 3:40
5. "Ohh (The Blues)" – 3:49
6. "Borrowed Time" – 4:05
7. "Available for You" – 3:38
8. "Step Aside for the Man" – 3:12
9. "Better Luck Next Time" – 3:17
10. "Can't Come Quickly Enough" – 3:30
11. "Monkey Baby" – 5:25
12. "Doctor (I'm Only Seeing Dark)" – 4:27
13. "Electrobix" – 5:03
14. "Us and Them" – 2:13
15. "Laura" (original version) – 3:32
16. "Backwoods Discoteque Pt. 2" – 4:23
17. "Music Is the Victim" – 2:58
18. "Someone to Touch" – 3:52
19. "Return to Oz" (original version) – 4:49
