= We Are Scissor Sisters... And So Are You =

Video by Scissor Sisters
- Released: November 29, 2004
- Recorded: Brighton Dome
- Genre: Pop, Rock
- Label: Polydor (UK); Universal B0002772-02 (US)
- Producer: Scissor Sisters

We Are Scissor Sisters... And So Are You is the first DVD by the Scissor Sisters, released on November 29, 2004. It contains a full live concert filmed at Brighton Dome in August 2004, featuring backstage footage and extras. It includes the documentary "Return To Oz" (directed by Julien Temple) which tells the story of the Scissor Sisters. There is also a separate 10-minute skit directed by Andy Soup which has the band dressed up as characters from The Wizard of Oz, which also includes "terribly bad acting" as mentioned on their official website.

== Track listing ==
=== Live from the Brighton Dome ===
1. "Intro"
2. "Take Your Mama"
3. "Better Luck"
4. "Tits on the Radio"
5. "The Skins"
6. "Magnifique"
7. "Rock My Spot"
8. "Laura"
9. "Mary"
10. "Comfortably Numb"
11. "Filthy/Gorgeous"
12. "Return to Oz"
13. "It Can't Come Quickly Enough"
14. "Music is the Victim"

=== Music videos ===
1. Laura (Version 1)
2. Comfortably Numb
3. Take Your Mama
4. Laura (Version 2)
5. Mary

=== Other ===
- 4Play Film
- Jake Shears vs. Lewis Carroll
- Music is the Victim (Live at Benicassim)
- Return to Oz (Documentary)
