= Brit Awards 2005 =

British music awards ceremony

- Date: 9 February 2005
- Venue: Earls Court
- Hosted by: Chris Evans
- Most awards: Scissor Sisters (3)
- Most nominations: Franz Ferdinand (5)

Television/radio coverage
- Network: ITV

Brit Awards 2005 was the 25th edition of the Brit Awards, an annual pop music awards ceremony in the United Kingdom, which for this edition was marketed as "Brits 25 - The 25th Show". The show was broadcast on the UK ITV network, and attracted 6.32 million viewers.

The producers added a fake film effect to the telecast of the 2005 awards show, which was criticised by some who thought ruined the immediacy of the awards show, and was dizzying when combined with fast camera movements.

The host was Chris Evans and the venue for the event was Earls Court.

== Performances ==
Artist	Featuring	Song
Bob Geldof		"I Don't Like Mondays"
Daniel Bedingfield	Natasha Bedingfield	"Ain't Nobody"
Franz Ferdinand		"Take Me Out"
Green Day		"American Idiot"
Gwen Stefani		"What You Waiting For?"
Jamelia	Lemar	"Addicted to Love"
Joss Stone	Robbie Williams	"Right to Be Wrong" "Angels"
Keane		"Everybody's Changing"
Snoop Dogg	Pharrell	"What's My Name?"
Scissor Sisters		"Take Your Mama"
The Streets		"Dry Your Eyes"

== Winners and nominees ==
British Album of the Year (presented by Clive Owen)	British Single of the Year (presented by Minnie Driver)
Keane – Hopes and Fears; Franz Ferdinand – Franz Ferdinand; Muse – Absolution; Snow Patrol – Final Straw; The Streets – A Grand Don't Come for Free	Will Young – "Your Game"; Band Aid 20 – "Do They Know It's Christmas?"; George Michael – "Amazing"; Jamelia – "Thank You"; Keane – "Everybody's Changing"; LMC vs U2 – "Take Me to the Clouds Above"; Natasha Bedingfield – "These Words"; The Shapeshifters – "Lola's Theme"; The Streets – "Dry Your Eyes"; Sugababes – "In the Middle"
British Male Solo Artist (presented by Naomie Harris)	British Female Solo Artist (presented by Lisa Stansfield)
The Streets; Jamie Cullum; Lemar; Morrissey; Will Young	Joss Stone; Amy Winehouse; Jamelia; Natasha Bedingfield; PJ Harvey
British Group (presented by Kelly Osbourne and Sharon Osbourne)	British Breakthrough Act (presented by Jo Whiley)
Franz Ferdinand; Kasabian; Keane; Muse; Snow Patrol	Keane; Franz Ferdinand; Joss Stone; Natasha Bedingfield; The Zutons
British Pop Act (presented by Jodie Kidd)	British Urban Act (presented by Jazzy B)
McFly; Avril Lavigne (Canada); Girls Aloud; Natasha Bedingfield; Westlife (Ireland)	Joss Stone; Dizzee Rascal; Jamelia; Lemar; The Streets
British Rock Act (presented by Brian May)	British Live Act (presented by Shirley Manson)
Franz Ferdinand; Kasabian; Muse; Snow Patrol; The Libertines	Muse; Franz Ferdinand; Jamie Cullum; Kasabian; The Libertines
Best Song (presented by David Walliams and Matt Lucas)	International Album (presented by Siouxsie Sioux)
Robbie Williams – "Angels" (1997); Joy Division – "Love Will Tear Us Apart" (1980); Kate Bush – "Wuthering Heights" (1978); Queen – "We Are the Champions" (1977); Will Young – "Leave Right Now" (2003)	Scissor Sisters – Scissor Sisters; The Killers – Hot Fuss; Maroon 5 – Songs About Jane; Outkast – Speakerboxxx/The Love Below; U2 – How To Dismantle An Atomic Bomb
International Male Solo Artist (presented by Natalie Imbruglia)	International Female Solo Artist (presented by Charlie Creed-Miles)
Eminem; Brian Wilson; Kanye West; Tom Waits; Usher	Gwen Stefani; Alicia Keys; Anastacia; Kelis; Kylie Minogue
International Group (presented by Bernard Sumner and Peter Hook)	International Breakthrough Act (presented by Simon Pegg)
Scissor Sisters; Green Day; Maroon 5; Outkast; U2	Scissor Sisters; Jet; Kanye West; The Killers; Maroon 5

=== Outstanding Contribution to Music ===
- Bob Geldof

== Multiple nominations and awards ==
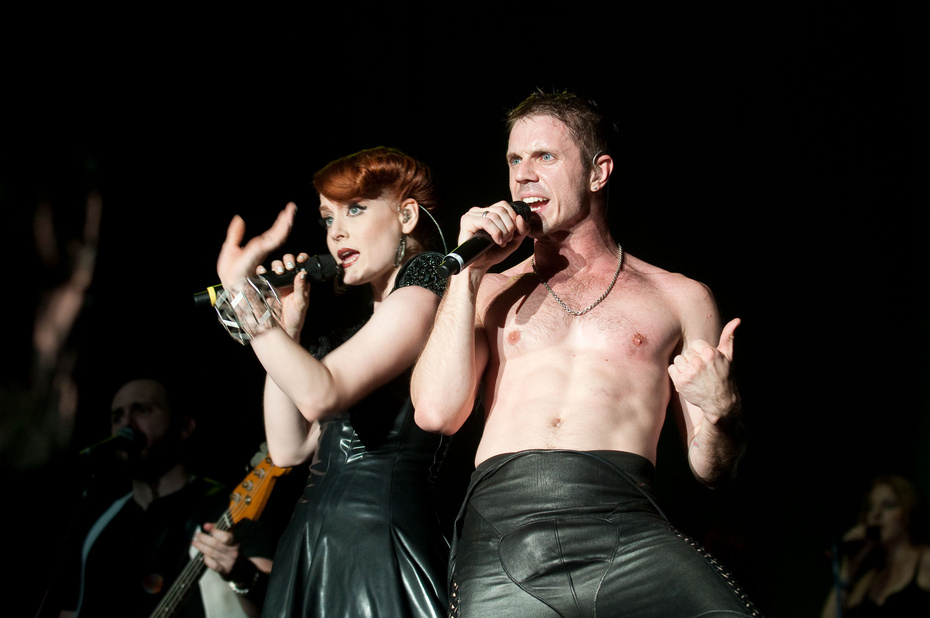
Three-time winner Scissor Sisters

Artists that received multiple nominations
Nominations	Artist
5	Franz Ferdinand
4 (3)	Keane
4 (3)	Muse
4 (3)	The Streets
3 (9)	Jamelia
3 (9)	Joss Stone
3 (9)	Kasabian
3 (9)	Maroon 5
3 (9)	Natasha Bedingfield
3 (9)	Scissor Sisters
3 (9)	Snow Patrol
3 (9)	U2
3 (9)	Will Young
2 (6)	Jamie Cullum
2 (6)	Kanye West
2 (6)	The Killers
2 (6)	Lemar
2 (6)	The Libertines
2 (6)	Outkast

Artists that received multiple awards
Awards	Artist
3	Scissor Sisters
2 (3)	Franz Ferdinand
2 (3)	Joss Stone
2 (3)	Keane

== See also ==
- Naomi Awards
