= Electrobix =

Single by Scissor Sisters

from the album The Demo Album and K-Mart Disco
- Released: May 2, 2002
- Recorded: 2002
- Genre: Dance-pop
- Length: 5:57 (12-inch mix)
- Label: A Touch of Class
- Songwriter(s): Jason Sellards, Scott Hoffman
- Producer(s): Scissor Sisters

Scissor Sisters singles chronology
"Electrobix" (2002)	"Laura" (2003)

"Electrobix" is a song by American band Scissor Sisters and is the first single from the Scissor Sisters' 2003 demo album. Released as a 12-inch vinyl EP in 2002, "Electrobix" is not the best-known track on the EP, with its B-side "Comfortably Numb" gaining much more club and airplay than the A-side.

The track resurfaced on A Touch of Class's 2004 compilation album Remixed!. The versions found on this album are the 12" mix and the "Hungry Wives Passive Depressive" mix.

There is much debate as to whether a video of "Electrobix" exists. Clips shown on the band's first DVD We Are Scissor Sisters… And So Are You of Jake taking pills and reading muscle magazines and Ana's mouthing of the words "Are you a Scissor Sister" amongst an aerobic class suggest a video exists.

== Track listing ==
- 12-inch/Digital release
1. "Electrobix" (12-inch mix)
2. "Electrobix" (radio edit)
3. "Electrobix" (Hungry Wives Passive Depressive mix)
4. "Comfortably Numb"

== Official remixes ==
1. Hungry Wives Passive Depressive mix
2. 12-inch remix
