= Brit Award for International Breakthrough Act =

British music award

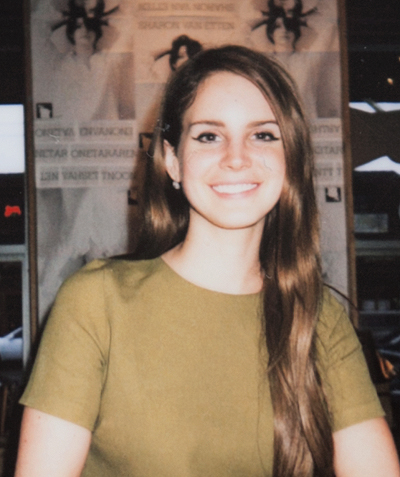
- 2012 Winner Lana Del Rey
- Awarded for: Achievement in Excellent International Breakthrough Act
- Country: United Kingdom (UK)
- Presented by: British Phonographic Industry (BPI)
- First award: 1988
- Final award: 2012
- Currently held by: Lana Del Rey (2012)
- Website: www.brits.co.uk

The Brit Award for International Breakthrough Act was an award given by the British Phonographic Industry (BPI), an organisation which represents record companies and artists in the United Kingdom. The accolade used to be presented at the Brit Awards, an annual celebration of British and international music. The winners and nominees are determined by the Brit Awards voting academy with over one-thousand members, which comprises record labels, publishers, managers, agents, media, and previous winners and nominees.

== History ==
The award was first presented in 1988 as awards as "International Newcomer" which was won by Terence Trent D'Arby. In 2003 the award was renamed to "International Breakthrough Act". The accolade was not handed out at the 2008 and 2009 ceremonies and has been defunct as of 2013.

== Winners and nominees ==
Year	Recipient	Nominees
1988 (8th)	(United States) Terence Trent D'Arby	(United States) Beastie Boys; (United States) LL Cool J; (United States) Los Lobos; (United States) Bruce Willis
1989 (9th)	(United States) Tracy Chapman	(United States) Belinda Carlisle; (Republic of Ireland) Enya; (United States) Salt-N-Pepa; (United States) Michelle Shocked
1990 (10th)	(Sweden) Neneh Cherry	(United States) Paula Abdul; (United States) Bobby Brown; (United States) De La Soul; (United States) Guns N' Roses
1991 (11th)	(United States) MC Hammer	(United States) Mariah Carey; (United States) Deee-Lite; (United States) Wilson Phillips; (United States) Maria McKee
1992 (12th)	(United States) P.M. Dawn	(United States) Color Me Badd; (United States) Extreme; (United States) Harry Connick Jr.; (United States) Chris Isaak; (United States) Jellyfish
1993 (13th)	(United States) Nirvana	(United States) Tori Amos; (United States) Arrested Development; (United States) Boyz II Men; (United States) Curtis Stigers
1994 (14th)	(Iceland) Björk	(United States) 4 Non Blondes; (United States) Rage Against the Machine; (United States) Spin Doctors; (United States) SWV
1995 (15th)	(United States) Lisa Loeb	(United States) Carleen Anderson; (United States) Counting Crows; (United States) Marcella Detroit; (United States) Warren G
1996 (16th)	(Canada) Alanis Morissette	(Australia) Tina Arena; (Republic of Ireland) Boyzone; (United States) Foo Fighters; (United States) Garbage
1997 (17th)	(Italy) Robert Miles	(United States) Fun Lovin' Criminals; (United States) Joan Osborne; The Presidents of the United States of America; (United States) Tony Rich
1998 (18th)	(United States) Eels	(United States) Erykah Badu; (France) Daft Punk; (United States) Hanson; (United States) No Doubt
1999 (19th)	(Australia) Natalie Imbruglia	(France) Air; (Republic of Ireland) B*Witched; (Sweden) Eagle-Eye Cherry; (Australia) Savage Garden
2000 (20th)	(United States) Macy Gray	(United States) Eminem; (United States) Jennifer Lopez; (United States) Semisonic; (United States) Britney Spears
2001 (21st)	(United States) Kelis	(Norway) Lene Marlin; (United States) Pink; (United States) Jill Scott; (Republic of Ireland) Westlife
2002 (22nd)	(United States) The Strokes	(United States) Anastacia; (Australia) The Avalanches; (Canada) Nelly Furtado; (United States) Linkin Park
2003 (23rd)	(United States) Norah Jones	(Canada) Avril Lavigne; (Canada) Nickelback; (Colombia) Shakira; (United States) The White Stripes
2004 (24th)	(United States) 50 Cent	(United States) Evanescence; (United States) Kings of Leon; (Jamaica) Sean Paul; (Republic of Ireland) The Thrills
2005 (25th)	(United States) Scissor Sisters	(Australia) Jet; (United States) The Killers; (United States) Maroon 5; (United States) Kanye West
2006 (26th)	(United States) Jack Johnson	(Canada) Arcade Fire; (United States) John Legend; (Canada) Daniel Powter; (United States) The Pussycat Dolls
2007 (27th)	(United States) Orson	(United States) Gnarls Barkley; (United States) Ray LaMontagne; (United States) The Raconteurs; (Australia) Wolfmother
2008 (28th)	Not Awarded	
2009 (29th)	Not Awarded	
2010 (30th)	(United States) Lady Gaga	(United States) Animal Collective; (Australia) Empire of the Sun; (Australia) Daniel Merriweather; (United States) Taylor Swift
2011 (31st)	(Canada) Justin Bieber	(United States) Glee Cast; (United States) Bruno Mars; (United States) The National; (Australia) The Temper Trap
2012 (32nd)	(United States) Lana Del Rey	(United States) Aloe Blacc; (United States) Bon Iver; (United States) Foster the People; (Trinidad and Tobago) Nicki Minaj

Winners of the Brit Award for International Breakthrough Act

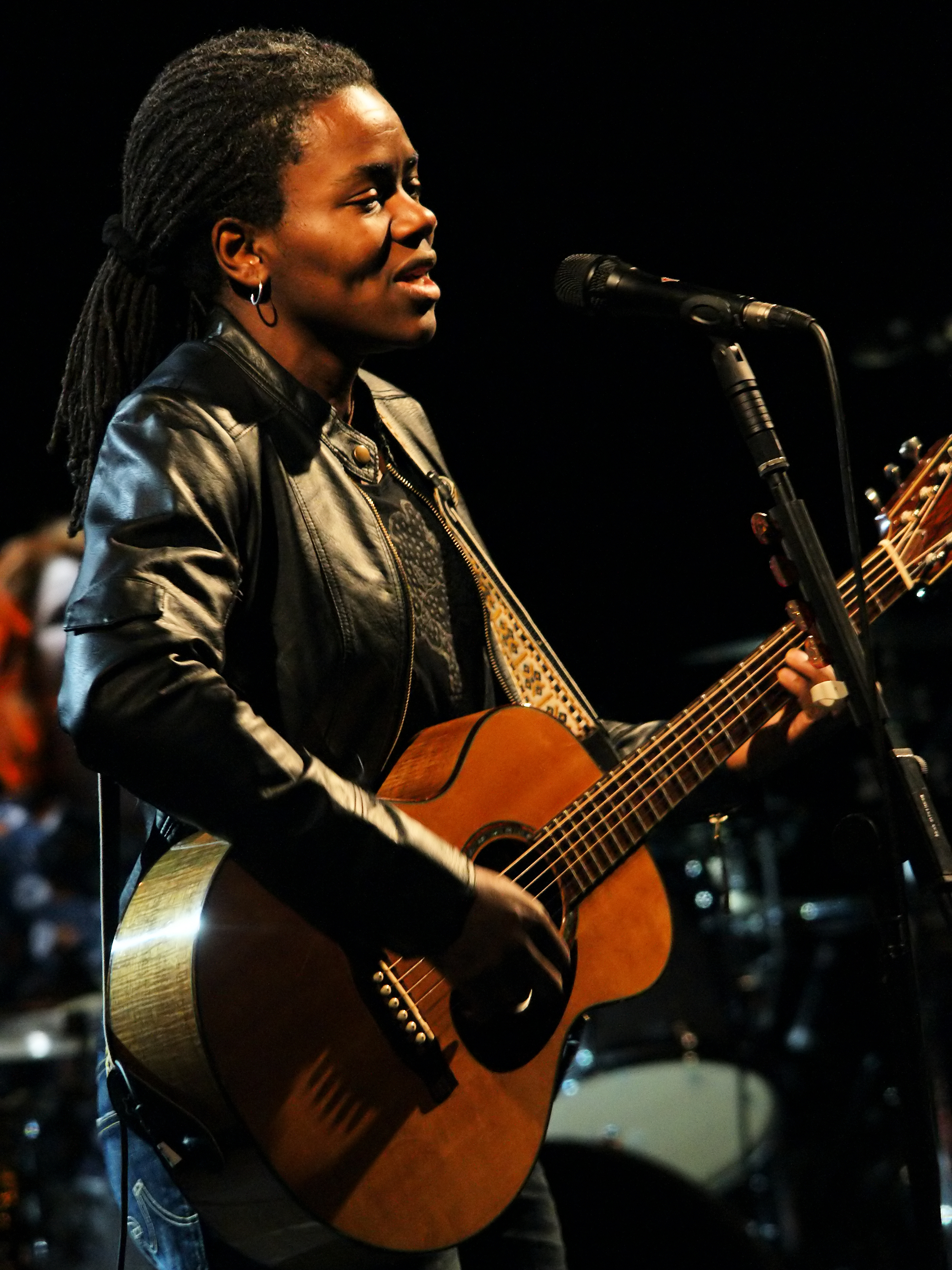
1989 winner, Tracy Chapman

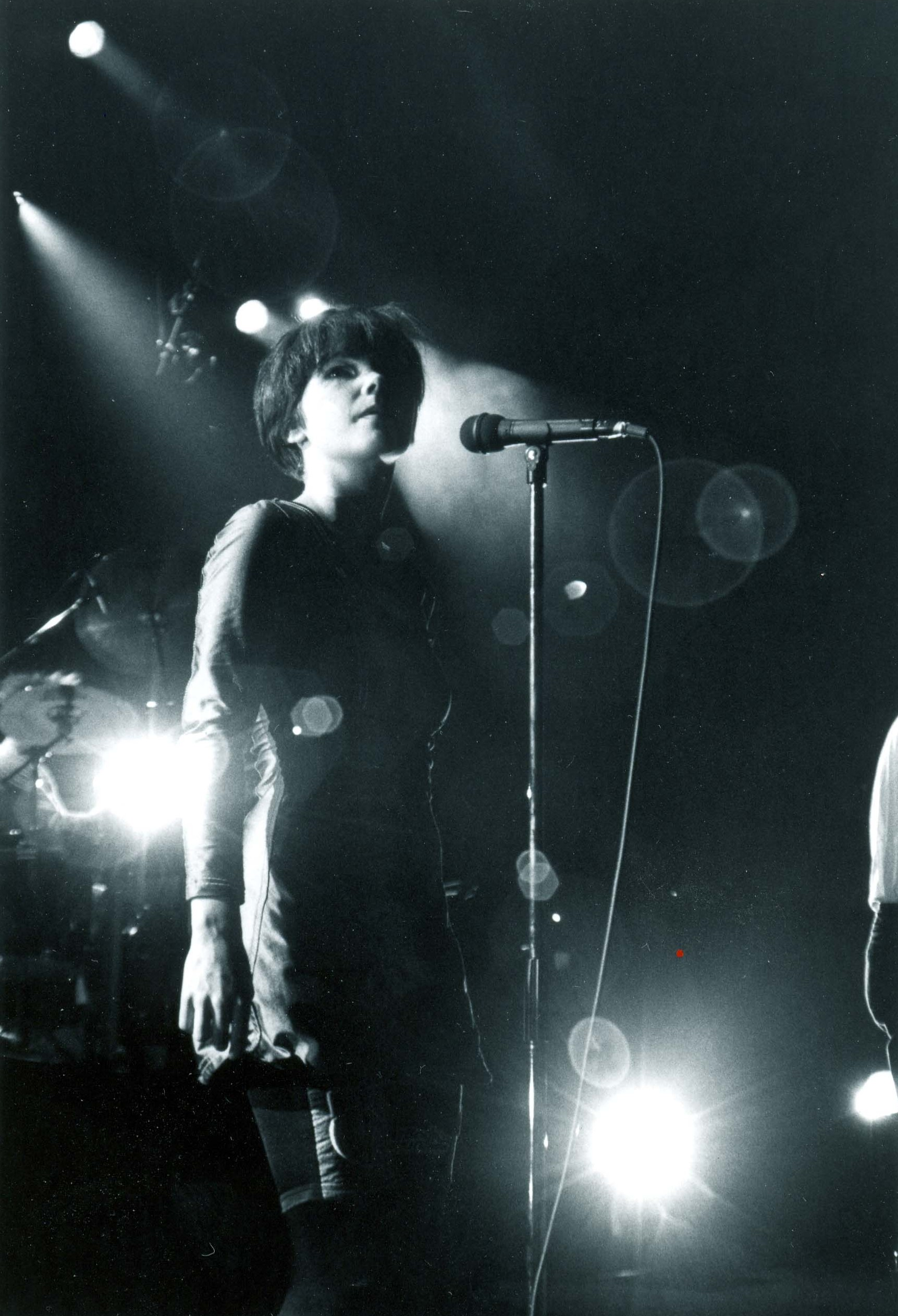
1994 winner, Björk

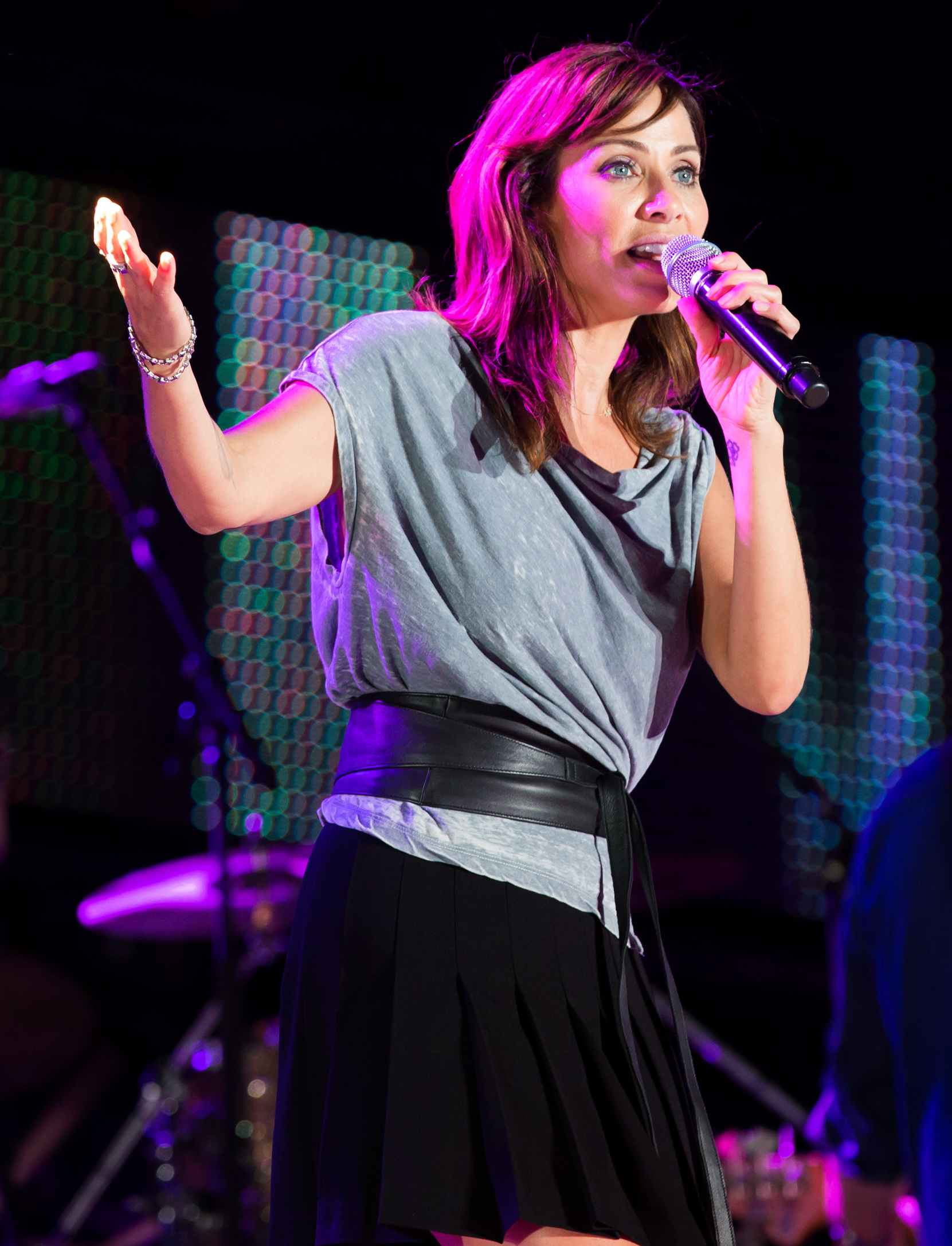
1999 winner, Natalie Imbruglia

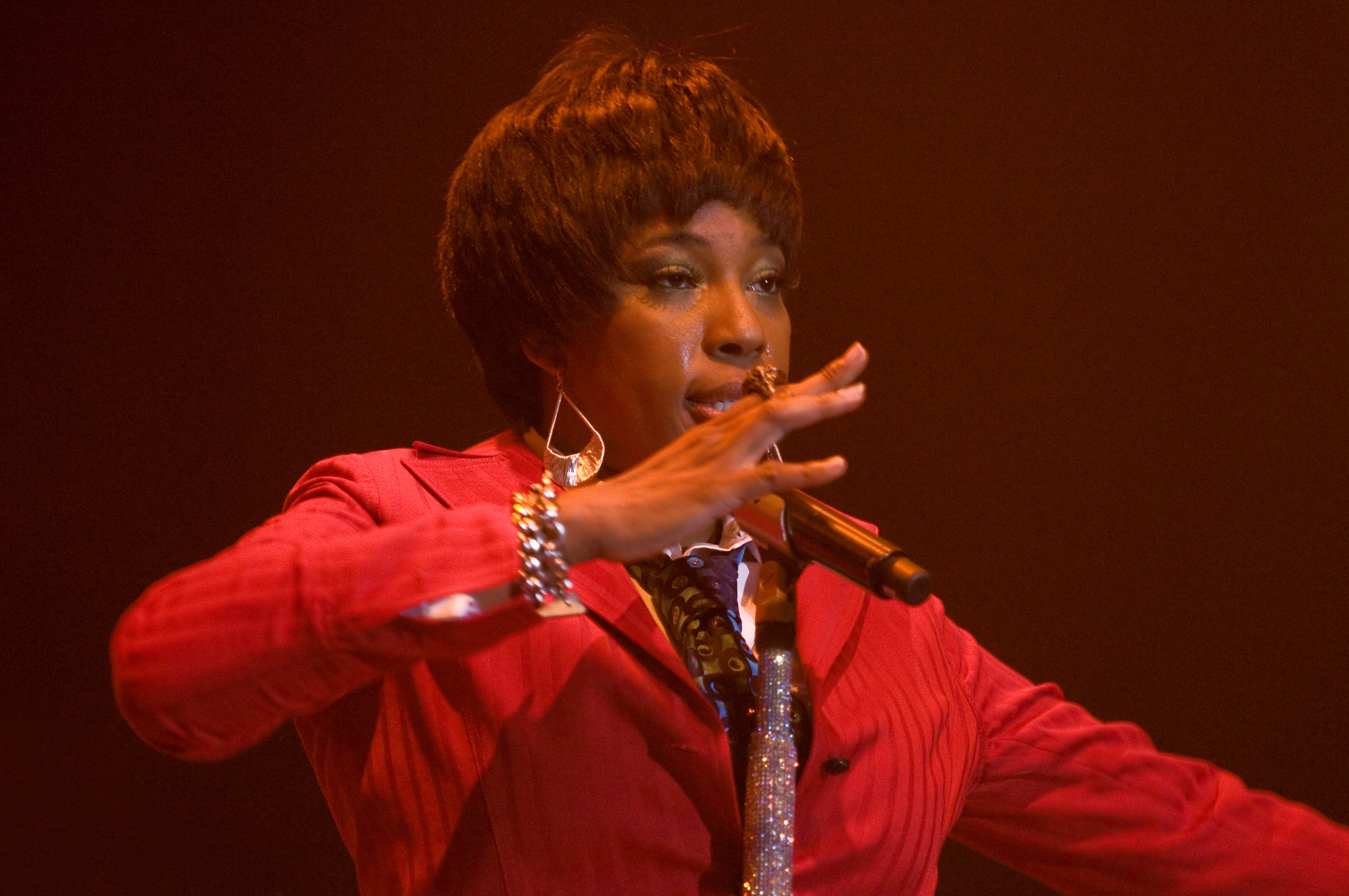
2000 winner, Macy Gray

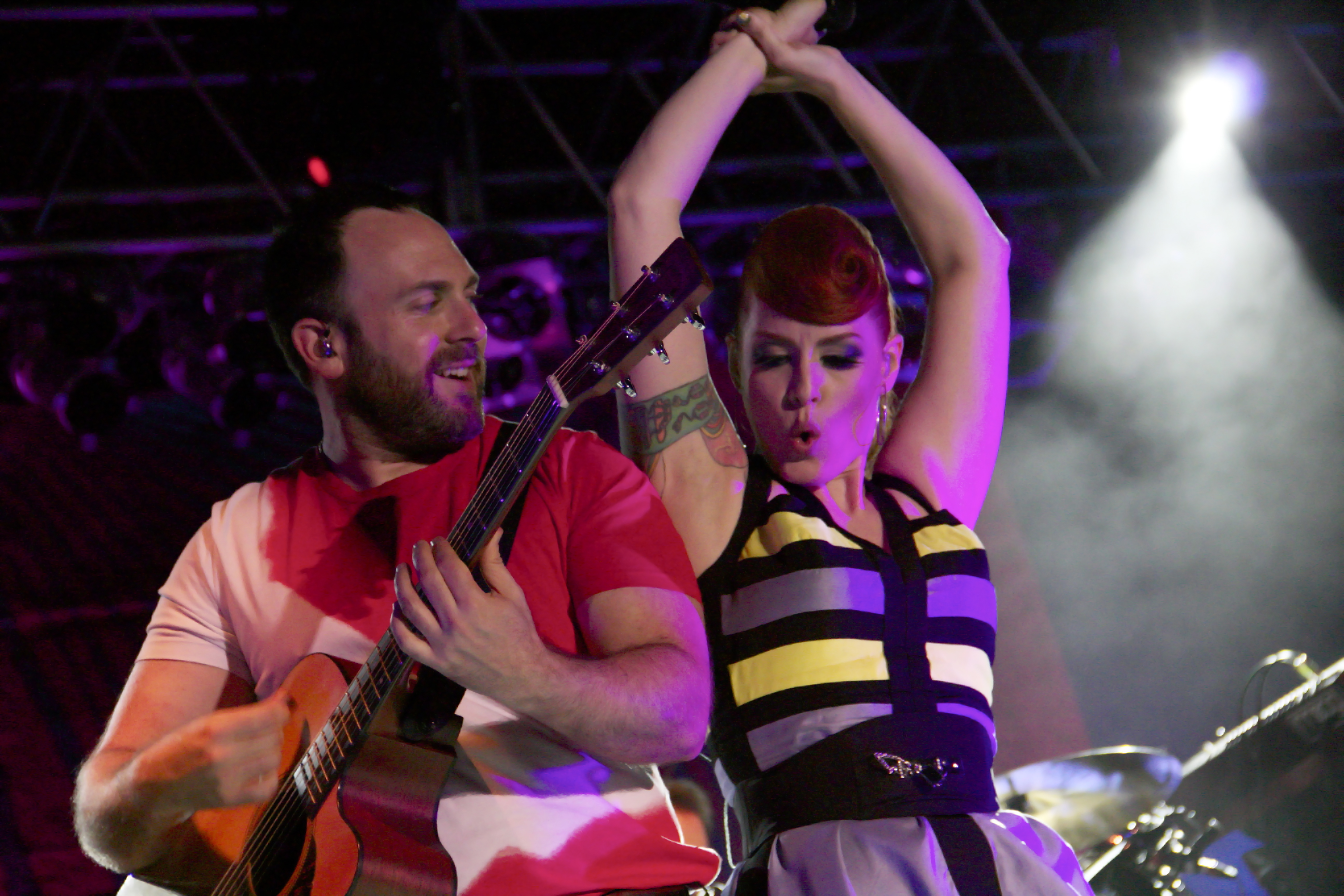
2005 winner, Scissor Sisters

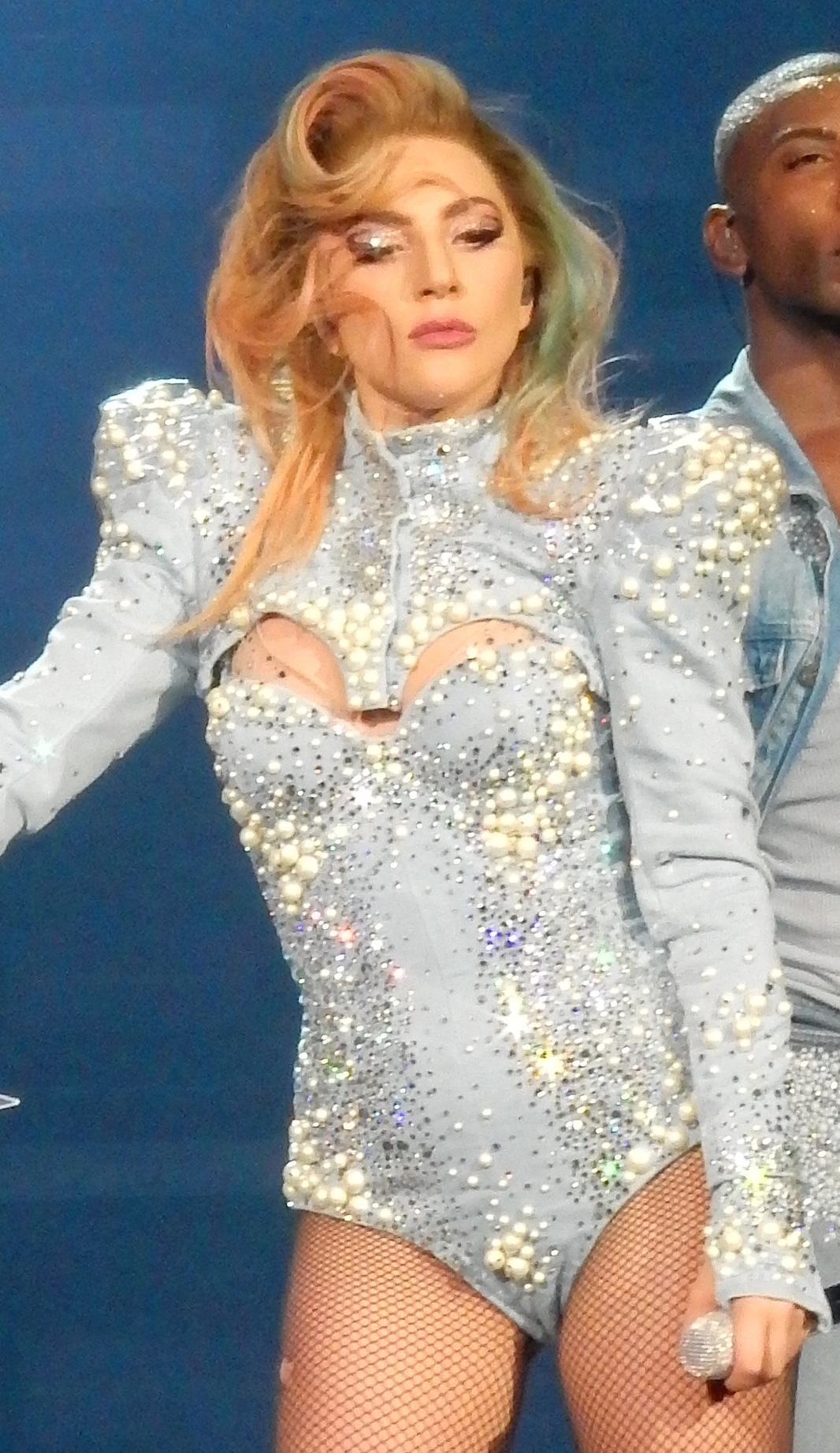
2010 winner, Lady Gaga

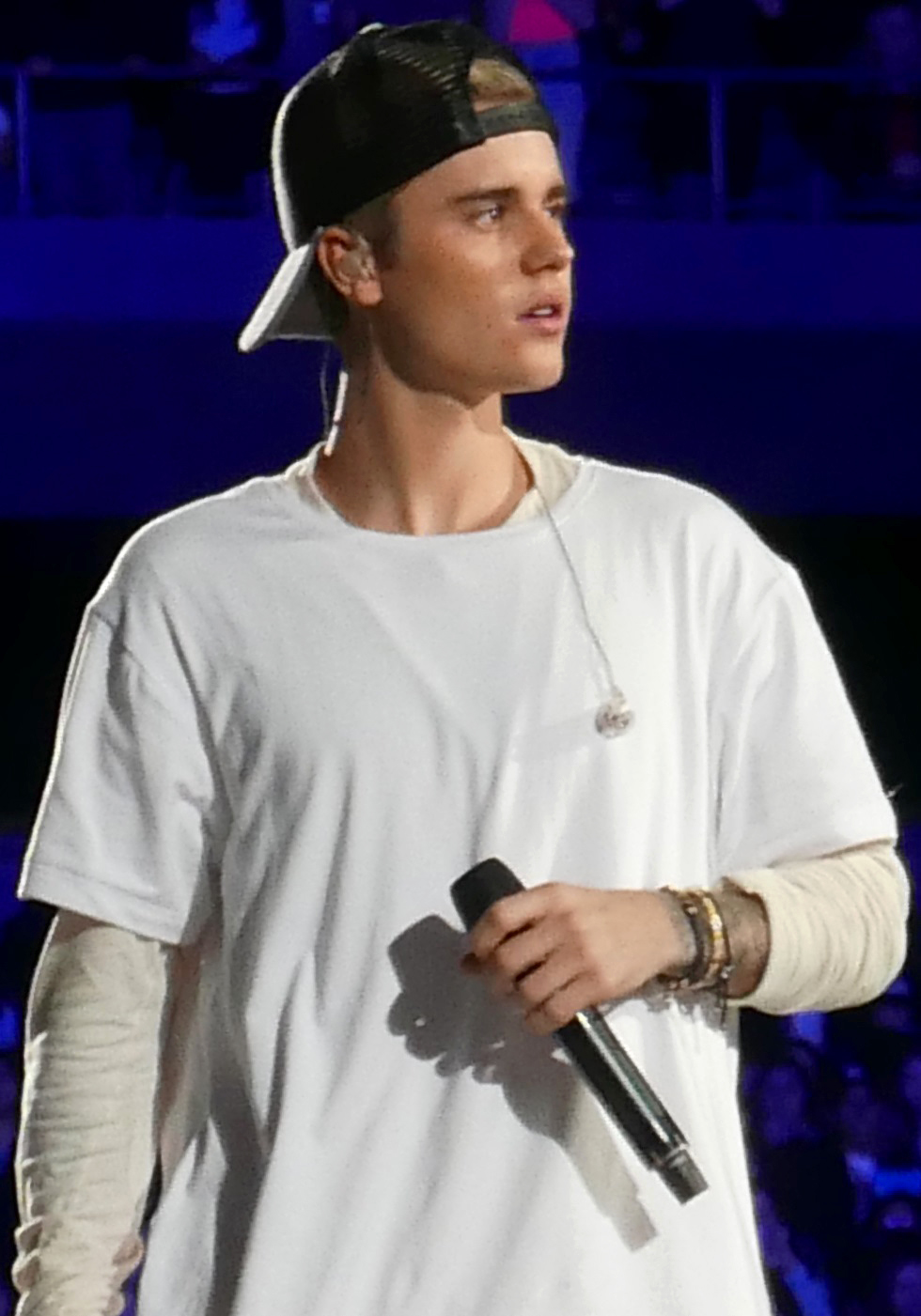
2011 winner, Justin Bieber

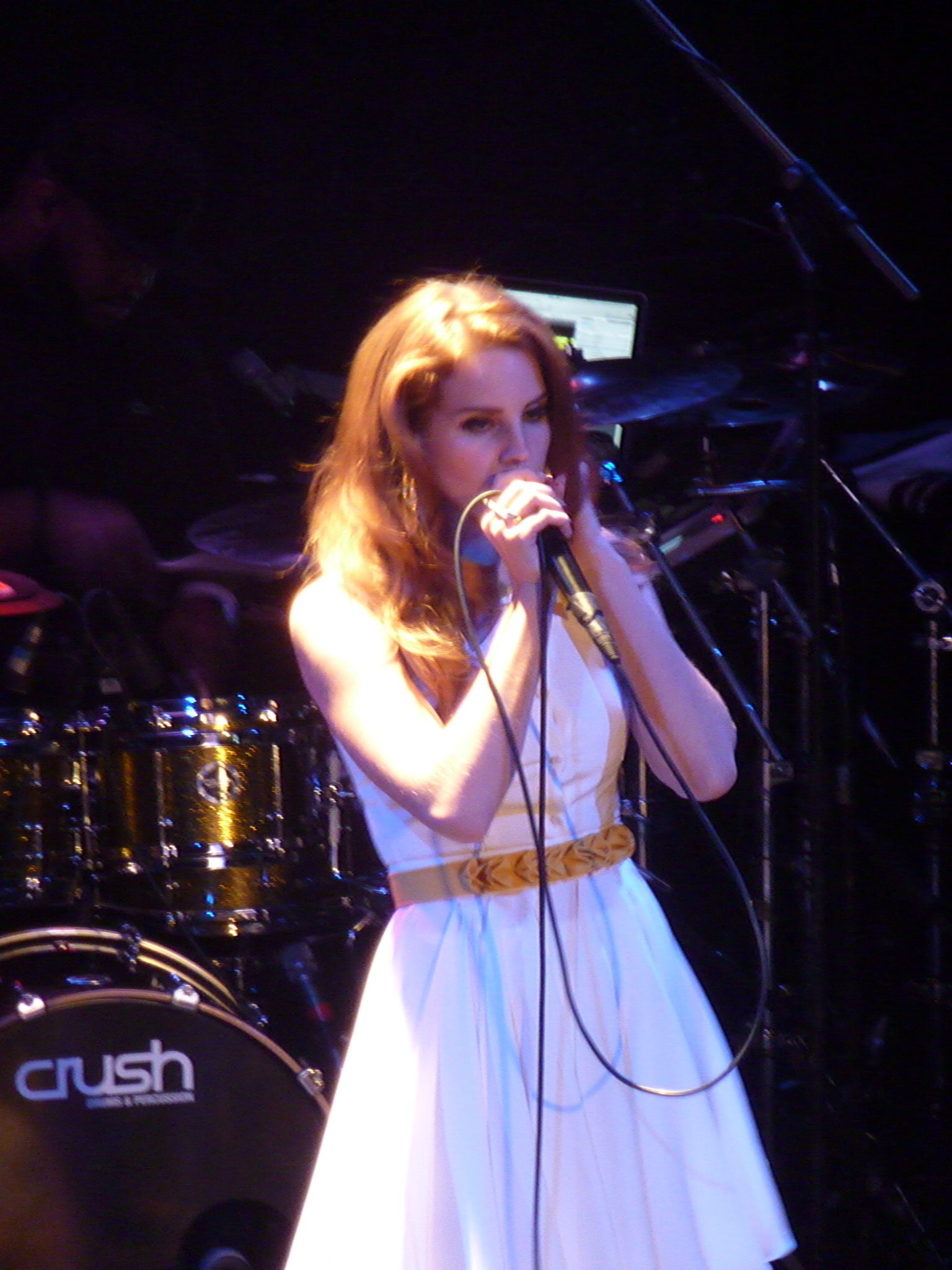
2012 winner, Lana Del Rey

== Countries by nominations ==
Only six non-American artists won the award; Swedish singer Neneh Cherry in 1990, Icelandic singer Björk in 1994, Canadian singer Alanis Morissette in 1996 (prior to acquiring American citizenship in 2005), Italian composer Robert Miles in 1997, Australian singer Natalie Imbruglia in 1999, and Canadian singer Justin Bieber in 2011. The only other Swedish nominee was Cherry's half-brother, Eagle-Eye Cherry.

Country	Nominations	First nomination	Last nomination	Artist/s
United States	85	1988	2012	Majority of nominees
Australia	9	1996	2011	Tina Arena, Natalie Imbruglia, Savage Garden, The Avalanches, Jet, Wolfmother, Empire of the Sun, Daniel Merriweather, The Temper Trap
Canada	7	1996	2011	Alanis Morissette, Nelly Furtado, Avril Lavigne, Nickelback, Arcade Fire, Daniel Powter, Justin Bieber
Ireland	5	1989	2004	Enya, Boyzone, B*Witched, Westlife, The Thrills
France	2	1998	1999	Daft Punk, Air
Sweden	2	1990	1999	Neneh Cherry, Eagle-Eye Cherry
Colombia	1	2003		Shakira
Iceland	1	1994		Björk
Italy	1	1997		Robert Miles
Jamaica	1	2004		Sean Paul
Norway	1	2001		Lene Marlin
Trinidad and Tobago	1	2012		Nicki Minaj

== Notes ==
- Tracy Chapman (1989), Björk (1994, 1996, 1998, 2016), Natalie Imbruglia (1999), Macy Gray (2000), Lady Gaga (2010), Lana Del Rey (2013) also won Brit Award for International Female Solo Artist
- Neneh Cherry (1990) also won Brit Award for International Solo Artist
- Scissor Sisters (2005) also won Brit Award for International Group
- Justin Bieber (2016) also won Brit Award for International Male Solo Artist
