= Invisible Light =

Single by Scissor Sisters

Single by Scissor Sisters

from the album Night Work
- Released: December 13, 2010
- Genre: Synthpop, electropop, nu-disco
- Length: 6:14
- Songwriters: Babydaddy, Jake Shears, Ana Matronic
- Producer: Stuart Price

Scissor Sisters singles chronology
"Any Which Way" (2010)	"Invisible Light" (2010)	"Only the Horses" (2012)

Music video
- "Invisible Light" on YouTube

"Invisible Light" is a song by American band Scissor Sisters, serving as the third and final single from their third studio album Night Work. The track, which features guest spoken-word vocals by actor Sir Ian McKellen, is what lead singer Jake Shears felt should have been the first single released for Night Work, even after his going with "Fire with Fire". McKellen appeared at the band's headline Glastonbury show in 2025 to perform the song live.

== Music video ==
The video for "Invisible Light" features a woman having a series of nightmares. She sees herself being dragged into the woods by a group of men, sleeping in a boat on a river, and attending her own funeral. The song itself was cut down from its six-minute album length into a radio edit of four minutes in length, and features the vocals of Sir McKellen spoken through an actor portraying a hypnotist. The bands' members describe the video as "a magical trip down the rabbit hole". The video is inspired by the nightmares of Mia Farrow in Rosemary's Baby and Catherine Deneuve in Belle de jour. Liz Taylor's version of Cleopatra also appears as a character in the video.

== Track listing ==
No.	Title	Length
1.	"Invisible Light" (Boys Noize Remix)	7:24
2.	"Invisible Light" (Stuart Price US 12" Mix)	7:25
3.	"Invisible Light" (Siriusmo Remix)	4:32
