= Baby Come Home (Scissor Sisters song) =

Single by Scissor Sisters

from the album Magic Hour
- Released: July 20, 2012
- Recorded: 2011
- Genre: Pop
- Length: 3:00
- Label: Polydor Records
- Songwriters: John Legend, Jason Sellards, Scott Hoffman, Ana Lynch
- Producers: Scissor Sisters, Alex Ridha

Scissor Sisters singles chronology
"Only the Horses" (2012)	"Baby Come Home" (2012)	"Let's Have a Kiki" (2012)

Music video
- "Baby Come Home" on YouTube

"Baby Come Home" is a song by American band Scissor Sisters. The track is the second single from their fourth studio album Magic Hour. It was released on July 20, 2012 in the United Kingdom. The song was written by John Legend, Jason Sellards, Scott Hoffman, Ana Lynch and produced by Scissor Sisters and Alex Ridha.

== Music video ==
A music video to accompany the release of "Baby Come Home" was directed by Lorenzo Fonda (the video was shot at the end of March in Hollywood studios) and first released onto YouTube on May 30, 2012 at a total length of three minutes and fourteen seconds. The video shows the band members dress up as a variety of characters. Jake Shears can be seen as a nun and knight in scenes, while Ana Matronic becomes a sailor and a witch.

== Critical reception ==
Lewis Corner of Digital Spy gave the song a positive review stating:

As such, we breathed a sigh of relief when the four-piece confirmed 'Baby Come Home' as their next single. Partly because its mix of bouncy piano and funky guitar is more addictive than a game of Temple Run, but mainly because it recalls classic Scissor Sisters circa 2004. It's a welcome reminder of their roots and one that deserves to replicate some of their heyday success..

== Track listing ==
Digital download
No.	Title	Length
1.	"Baby Come Home"	3:00
2.	"Baby Come Home" (Darq E Freaker Remix)	4:40
3.	"Baby Come Home" (Darq E Freaker Instrumental Dub)	4:39
4.	"Baby Come Home" (M Factor Remix)	7:01

== Credits and personnel ==
- Lead vocals: Scissor Sisters
- Producers: Scissor Sisters, Alex Ridha
- Lyrics: John Stephens, Jason Sellards, Scott Hoffman, Ana Lynch
- Label: Polydor Records

== Charts ==
Chart (2012)	Peak position
Belgium (Ultratip Bubbling Under Flanders)	74
Finland (Suomen virallinen lista)	2
Italy (FIMI)	36

== Release history ==
Country	Release date	Format	Label
United Kingdom	July 20, 2012	Polydor Records	Digital download
