= Let's Have a Kiki =

Single by Scissor Sisters

from the album Magic Hour
- Released: September 11, 2012
- Recorded: 2011
- Genre: Techno; house; freestyle
- Length: 3:49
- Label: Polydor
- Songwriters: Jason Sellards, Scott Hoffman, Ana Lynch
- Producer: Scissor Sisters

Scissor Sisters singles chronology
| "Baby Come Home" (2012) | "Let's Have a Kiki" (2012) | "Swerlk" (2017) |

Music video
- "Let's Have a Kiki" (Instructional video) on YouTube

"Let's Have a Kiki" is a song by American band Scissor Sisters. The third single from their fourth studio album Magic Hour, was released on September 11, 2012 in the United States and September 18, 2012 in the United Kingdom. The song was written by Jason Sellards, Scott Hoffman, Ana Lynch and produced by Scissor Sisters. The single reached number 119 on the official UK Singles Chart, following their performance on Strictly Come Dancing in October 2012.

== Background ==
A "kiki" is a meeting of friends for the purpose of gossiping and chit-chat, used mainly in gay culture.

== Music video ==
A music video to accompany the release of "Let's Have a Kiki" was first released on YouTube on July 27, 2012 at a total length of four minutes and four seconds. The video shows the band members performing a dance routine in a hall for the clip, which is labeled as an "Instructional Video". The video was directed by Vern Moen and choreographed by Brad Landers. On November 26, 2019, Billboard included it in the Top 100 Greatest Music Videos of the 2010s, coming in at #79.

== Promotion ==
Scissor Sisters performed "Let's Have a Kiki" on The Wendy Williams Show, as well as internationally in Australia on Sunrise, and in the United Kingdom on Strictly Come Dancing.

== Cover versions ==
"Let's Have a Kiki" inspired several viral video parodies from the drag queen community. Lady Bunny & Bianca Del Rio, Sherry Vine, and Willam Belli have all released their own versions of the song. Willam Belli released his version as a single, featuring Rhea Litré, from his album The Wreckoning.

In November 2012, a cover version of the song, in a mash-up with "Turkey Lurkey Time", was featured on the Fox TV series Glee, performed by Sarah Jessica Parker, Chris Colfer, and Lea Michele in the "Thanksgiving" episode.

== Track listings ==
Digital download
| No. | Title | Length |
|---|---|---|
| 1. | "Let's Have a Kiki" (album version) | 3:49 |

Digital remix download
| No. | Title | Length |
|---|---|---|
| 1. | "Let's Have a Kiki" (DJ Nita remix) | 6:54 |

Digital remix EP
| No. | Title | Length |
|---|---|---|
| 1. | "Let's Have a Kiki" (Peter Rauhofer's NYC Bitch mix) | 8:19 |
| 2. | "Let's Have a Kiki" (The 2 Bears remix) | 7:18 |
| 3. | "Let's Have a Kiki" (Almighty club remix) | 6:41 |
| 4. | "Let's Have a Kiki" (Danny Verde remix) | 6:58 |
| 5. | "Let's Have a Kiki" (DJ Nita remix) | 6:54 |
| 6. | "Let's Have a Kiki" (Olugbenga edit) | 4:42 |

== Credits and personnel ==
- Lead vocals: Scissor Sisters
- Producers: Scissor Sisters
- Lyrics: Jason Sellards, Scott Hoffman, Ana Lynch

== Charts ==
=== Weekly charts ===
| Chart (2012) | Peak position |
|---|---|
| United Kingdom (Official Charts Company) | 119 |
| US Dance Club Songs (Billboard) | 1 |

=== Year-end charts ===
| Chart (2012) | Position |
|---|---|
| US Hot Dance Club Songs (Billboard) | 22 |

== Release history ==
| Country | Release date | Format | Label |
|---|---|---|---|
| United States | September 11, 2012 | Digital remix EP | Polydor Records |
| United Kingdom | September 18, 2012 | Digital remix EP | Polydor Records |

== See also ==
- List of Billboard number-one dance songs of 2012
