= Shady Love =

Song by Scissor Sisters vs. Krystal Pepsy featuring Azealia Banks

from the album Magic Hour
- Released: May 25, 2012
- Recorded: 2011
- Genre: Alternative hip hop; electro house
- Length: 3:56
- Label: Polydor Records
- Songwriters: Jake Shears; Azealia Banks; Alex Ridha; Scott Hoffman
- Producer: Boys Noize

"Shady Love" is a song by American pop band Scissor Sisters which features front-man Jake Shears' pseudonym Krystal Pepsy and uncredited vocals from Harlem rapper Azealia Banks. The song was set for release in the United Kingdom on February 12, 2012 as the lead single from the band's fourth studio album (2012), but the release was cancelled for unconfirmed reasons. The track was written by frontman Jake Shears, Babdydaddy (Scott Hoffman), Azealia Banks, and was produced by Alex Ridha (who also co-wrote the song). "Shady Love" received its first play on January 2 by BBC Radio 1 DJ Annie Mac and was met with positive reviews, including NME who described it as "the first big hit of 2012".

The band did release the song as a 12-inch single, but to 300 of their Twitter and Facebook fans.

== Background ==
Talking about the song, Babydaddy stated: "It's a song we had fun making so while it wasn't necessarily true to the direction of the album or what most people might think of as Scissors, we thought it would be good to just get out there in between albums."

== Music video ==
A music video to accompany the release of "Shady Love" was first released onto YouTube on January 2, 2012 at a total length of four minutes and forty-one seconds. The video depicts a group of school children putting on a play, all lipsynching to the song.

== Track listing ==
Vinyl
No.	Title	Length
1.	"Shady Love" (Extended Mix)	5:20
2.	"Shady Love" (Riton Rerub)	5:01
3.	"Shady Love" (Seamus Haji Dub)	7:16
4.	"Shady Love" (Bless Beats Mood Swing Mix)	3:42

== Release history ==
Country	Release date	Format	Label
N/A	March 7, 2012	12" vinyl	Polydor (Self-released)
