= Any Which Way =

Single by Scissor Sisters

from the album Night Work
- B-side: "Sex Exciter"
- Released: September 20, 2010
- Genre: Synthpop, electropop, nu-disco
- Length: 4:41 (album version); 3:33 (radio edit)
- Label: Polydor
- Songwriters: Babydaddy, Jake Shears, Ana Matronic, Stuart Price
- Producer: Stuart Price

Scissor Sisters singles chronology
"Fire with Fire" (2010)	"Any Which Way" (2010)	"Invisible Light" (2010)

Music video
- "Any Which Way" on YouTube

"Any Which Way" is the second single from Scissor Sisters' third studio album Night Work, and was released on September 20, 2010. Australian pop singer Kylie Minogue provides uncredited backing vocals.

The b-side "Sex Exciter" features vocals & production from Alison Goldfrapp.

== Track list ==
UK CD single

1. "Any Which Way"
2. "Sex Exciter"

UK 12" single

1. "Any Which Way"
2. "Any Which Way" (Carte Blanche Remix)

UK iTunes single / AUS Digital EP

1. "Any Which Way"
2. "Any Which Way" (7th Heaven Remix)
3. "Any Which Way" (Carte Blanche Remix)
4. "Any Which Way" (Live from the Roundhouse)

== Charts ==
Weekly chart performance
Chart (2010)	Peak position
Italy Airplay (EarOne)	40
Scotland Singles (Official Charts)	73
UK Singles (Official Charts)	81
