= Mary (Scissor Sisters song) =

2004 single by Scissor Sisters

Single by Scissor Sisters

from the album Scissor Sisters
- B-side: "Take Me Out" (Jo Whiley Session)
- Released: October 11, 2004
- Length: 4:45
- Label: Polydor
- Songwriters: Babydaddy; Jake Shears
- Producer: Scissor Sisters

Scissor Sisters singles chronology
"Laura" (2004)	"Mary" (2004)	"Filthy/Gorgeous" (2005)

Music video
- "Mary" on YouTube

"Mary" is a song by American rock band Scissor Sisters, included on their eponymous debut album as the fourth track. Lead singer Jake Shears wrote "Mary" for his best friend, Mary Hanlon, who later died in April 2006 from a brain aneurysm.

"Mary" was released as a single in the United Kingdom on October 11, 2004, across three formats: a 12-inch picture disc, a regular 12-inch vinyl disc, and a CD single. The song peaking at number 14 on the UK Singles Chart and number 32 on the Irish Singles Chart.

== Music video ==
The video for the single was released in October 2004 and was considered a curio by fans. It was seen as a spoof of Rapunzel and other children's fairy tales. The music video was produced by Don Bluth. Scissor Sisters contacted him after recalling fond memories of an animated sequence in Xanadu. The video also includes a live-action portion, directed by Julien Temple showing a woman getting out of bed, boarding a London Underground train, departing at Canary Wharf tube station and entering and working in a Docklands office. This sequence segues into the animation with her staring into a photocopier, presumably indicating the animated sequence is her daydream.

== Track listings ==
UK 12-inch picture disc

A. "Mary" – 4:45
B. "Laura" (City Hi-Fi remix) – 4:20

UK 12-inch vinyl

A. "Mary" – 4:45
B. "Mary" (Junkie XL mix) – 8:46

UK CD single

1. "Mary" – 4:45
2. "Mary" (Junkie XL radio edit) – 3:55
3. "Take Me Out" (Jo Whiley Session) – 4:32

== Charts ==
Chart (2004)	Peak position
Ireland (IRMA)	32
Scottish Singles Sales (Official Charts)	14
UK Singles (Official Charts)	14

== Release history ==
Region	Date	Format	Label	ID	Ref.
United Kingdom	October 11, 2004	12-inch picture disc	Polydor	986 828-0	
United Kingdom	October 11, 2004	12-inch vinyl	Polydor	986 828-1	
United Kingdom	October 11, 2004	CD	Polydor	986 828-2	
