= Only the Horses =

2012 single by Scissor Sisters

Single by Scissor Sisters

from the album Magic Hour
- Released: April 13, 2012
- Recorded: 2011
- Genre: Progressive house
- Length: 3:39
- Label: Casablanca
- Songwriters: Jason Sellards; Scott Hoffman; Amanda Ghost; Alex Ridha
- Producers: Scissor Sisters; Boys Noize; Calvin Harris

Scissor Sisters singles chronology
"Invisible Light" (2010)	"Only the Horses" (2012)	"Baby Come Home" (2012)

Music video
- "Only The Horses" on YouTube

"Only the Horses" is a song by American band Scissor Sisters. The track is the first single from their fourth studio album, Magic Hour. It premiered on April 6, 2012, on BBC Radio 1, and was released to various iTunes Stores as a single on April 13, 2012, in Europe and was released on May 13, 2012, in the United Kingdom.

Scissor Sisters worked with producers Boys Noize and Calvin Harris on the track, after having met Harris while working with Kylie Minogue on her eleventh studio album, Aphrodite.

== Music video ==
Directed by Lorenzo Fonda and produced by Ross Levine, the music video for "Only the Horses" was released on April 19, 2012, and features a quartet of horses running through the desert in slow motion. Attached to the horses are long hempen ropes, and over the course of the video it becomes clear that the other ends of the ropes are attached to metal plates set in a decorated triangular panel. As the ropes run out of slack, the equestrian imagery is intercut with slow-motion reversed footage of paint cascading over people (the band members, with Jake Shears covered in pink, Del Marquis in yellow, BabyDaddy in green and Ana Matronic in blue). At the end of the video (quite evidently a homage to John Huston's, The Misfits), the taut ropes pull the plates from the panel and fountains of paint shoot out.

== Critical reception ==
Lewis Corner of Digital Spy blog gave the song a positive review, stating:

"Only the horses can find us tonight/ Only the horses can bring us back home," Jake Shears belts over Calvin's usual mix of gleeful synths and fluorescent beats, though still retaining much of the band's camp and carefree vibrancy from when we first fell in love with them. The result is much like the song's interesting choice of a saviour; a number that canters along powerfully enough to last the distance..

== Track listing ==
Single
No.	Title	Length
1.	"Only the Horses"	3:39

EP
No.	Title	Length
1.	"Only the Horses"	3:43
2.	"Only the Horses" (Calvin Harris Extended Mix)	4:32
3.	"Only the Horses" (Max Sanna and Steve Pitron Remix)	7:27
4.	"Magic Hour Medley"	4:29

US Remixes EP
No.	Title	Length
1.	"Only the Horses" (Max Sanna and Steve Pitron Remix)	7:27
2.	"Only the Horses" (Tommie Sunshine Horsepower Remix)	6:46
3.	"Only the Horses" (Louis Brodinski Remix)	4:38
4.	"Only the Horses" (Cyantific and Dimension Remix)	4:18

12-inch single
No.	Title	Length
1.	"Only the Horses"	3:42
2.	"Only the Horses" (Calvin Harris Extended Mix)	4:28
3.	"Only the Horses" (Max Sanna and Steve Pitron Mix Edit)	3:48
4.	"Only the Horses" (Max Sanna and Steve Pitron Club Mix)	7:23

US DJ Promo CD 2
No.	Title	Length
1.	"Only the Horses" (Max Sanna and Steve Pitron Club Remix)	7:22
2.	"Only the Horses" (Max Sanna and Steve Pitron Radio Remix)	3:46
3.	"Only the Horses" (Rich Morel Vocal)	7:08
4.	"Only the Horses" (Tommie Sunshine Horsepower Remix)	6:42
5.	"Only the Horses" (Kabuki Cheerleader Remix)	6:16
6.	"Only the Horses" (Kabuki Cheerleader WAR Dub)	5:46
7.	"Only the Horses" (Cyantific And Dimension Remix)	4:18

== Charts ==
=== Weekly charts ===
Weekly chart performance for "Only the Horses"
Chart (2012)	Peak position
Belgium (Ultratop 50 Flanders)	37
Belgium Dance (Ultratop Flanders)	21
Belgium (Ultratip Bubbling Under Wallonia)	33
Global Dance Songs (Billboard)	34
Ireland (IRMA)	32
Italy (FIMI)	5
Italy Airplay (EarOne)	1
Japan Hot 100 (Billboard)	21
Scotland Singles (OCC)	7
UK Singles (OCC)	12
US Dance Club Songs (Billboard)	5
US Dance Singles Sales (Billboard)	8

=== Year-end charts ===
Chart (2012)	Position
Italy (FIMI)	33
Italy Airplay (EarOne)	3

== Certifications ==
Certifications for "Only the Horses"
Region	Certification	Certified units/sales
Denmark (IFPI Danmark)	Gold	900,000^{†}
Italy (FIMI)	Platinum	30,000^{*}
^{*} Sales figures based on certification alone.^{†} Streaming-only figures based on certification alone.

== Release history ==
Release dates for "Only the Horses"
Country	Release date	Format	Label
Australia	April 13, 2012	Single	Polydor
Finland	April 13, 2012	Single	Polydor
France	April 13, 2012	Single	Polydor
Japan	April 13, 2012	Single	Polydor
New Zealand	April 13, 2012	Single	Polydor
Norway	April 13, 2012	Single	Polydor
Spain	April 13, 2012	Single	Polydor
Sweden	April 13, 2012	Single	Polydor
Switzerland	April 13, 2012	Single	Polydor
Australia	May 13, 2012	EP	Polydor
Germany	May 13, 2012	EP	Polydor
Ireland	May 13, 2012	EP	Polydor
New Zealand	May 13, 2012	EP	Polydor
United Kingdom	May 13, 2012	EP	Polydor
United States	May 15, 2012	Single digital download; Remixes EP	Polydor
