= Night Work (album) =

Studio album by Scissor Sisters
- Released: June 28, 2010
- Genres: Alternative rock; glam rock; nu-disco
- Length: 44:21
- Label: Polydor
- Producers: Stuart Price; Scissor Sisters

Scissor Sisters chronology
K-Mart Disco (2007)	Night Work (2010)	iTunes Festival: London 2010 (2010)

Singles from Night Work
- 1. "Fire with Fire" Released: June 20, 2010; 2. "Any Which Way" Released: September 20, 2010; 3. "Invisible Light" Released: December 16, 2010

Night Work is the third studio album by American band Scissor Sisters. It was released on June 28, 2010, and was preceded by the release of the lead single "Fire with Fire" on June 20.

== Background ==
Night Work is actually the fourth album that the band recorded. In 2008, the band played two secret gigs, billed as Queef Latina and Debbie's Hairy, where they tested some of their newly recorded material for a third album, including "The Other Girls", "Singularity", "Not the Loving Kind", "Uroboros", "Who's There?" and a cover of Roxy Music's single "Do the Strand". Other song titles mentioned by Jake Shears include "Who's Your Money", "Thanks for Asking", "Television", "Taking Shape", "Second Heart", "Number 1 in 3rd World", "Hey Now", "Major for You", "Dogs", "Hollywood Wives", "Permanent Wave", "Private Midnight", and "Sadistic". On May 8, 2010, Shears stated that the band had decided to scrap the material the previous year. Shears said of the decision, "If it wasn't something we could fully get behind and believe in, I think the band was going to be over."

"Do the Strand" was recorded and released in 2009 as a part of the War Child charity album War Child Presents Heroes, among several covers performed by Franz Ferdinand, Beck, Yeah Yeah Yeahs and others.

The band teamed up with producer Stuart Price to record completely new material.

The cover art is a 1980 Robert Mapplethorpe photograph of dancer Peter Reed's buttocks, which led to controversy among conservative people. When asked about the cover, guitarist and bass player Del Marquis stated, "The way someone reacts to it will tell you a lot about that person. People could view it with reactionary homophobia, or they could view it as camp, or high art, or something beautiful. It reminds me of the back of Sticky Fingers actually – it's a really classic-looking album cover" and added that it was controversial "because people still react in a really strange way to the sexualisation of the male form. We're much more comfortable with the sexualisation of the female form. The cover's been blown up on billboards all over town and it's really exciting for me to be driving through religiously conservative neighbourhoods and seeing this giant gorgeous clenched man's ass!"

== Singles ==
The first single released from the album was "Fire with Fire", which met critical and commercial success, debuting and peaking at number 11 on the UK Singles Chart and number one on the US Billboard Dance Club Songs chart. It was followed by "Any Which Way", which features uncredited backing vocals by Kylie Minogue, to moderate success in European charts. "Invisible Light", which features guest vocals by actor Sir Ian McKellen, was released as the third and final single in December. Prior to this release, a promotional EP was made available on Boys Noize Records on August 16, 2010, featuring the original track as well as remixes by Boys Noize, Stuart Price, and Siriusmo. This EP was released on a transparent, yellow vinyl edition in addition to CD and download formats.

== Critical reception ==
Professional ratings
Review scores
Source	Rating
AllMusic	3.5/5 stars
Entertainment Weekly	A−
The Guardian	3/5 stars
musicOMH	3.5/5 stars
NME	7/10
Pitchfork	7.6/10
PopMatters	5/10
Robert Christgau	A−
Rolling Stone	3/5 stars
Slant Magazine	4/5 stars

According to Metacritic the album was met with generally favorable reviews, reaching a metascore of 72 based on 21 reviews.

== Commercial performance ==
The album debuted at number eighteen on the US Billboard 200, selling 18,260 copies in its first week, giving Scissor Sisters their second top-20 album.

In the UK, the album debuted at number two, behind Eminem's album Recovery, selling 46,071 copies.

== Track listing ==
No.	Title	Writer(s)	Producer(s)	Length
1.	"Night Work"	Jason Sellards, Scott Hoffman, Derek Gruen, Stuart Price	Stuart Price, Scissor Sisters	3:08
2.	"Whole New Way"	Sellards, Hoffman, Price	Stuart Price, Scissor Sisters	2:53
3.	"Fire with Fire"	Sellards, Hoffman, Price	Stuart Price, Scissor Sisters	4:13
4.	"Any Which Way"	Sellards, Hoffman, Ana Lynch, Price	Stuart Price, Scissor Sisters	4:41
5.	"Harder You Get"	Sellards, Hoffman, Price	Stuart Price, Scissor Sisters	3:06
6.	"Running Out"	Sellards, Hoffman, Santi White	Stuart Price, Scissor Sisters	3:09
7.	"Something Like This"	Sellards, Hoffman	Stuart Price, Scissor Sisters	3:02
8.	"Skin This Cat"	Hoffman, Lynch, Sellards	Stuart Price, Scissor Sisters	2:41
9.	"Skin Tight"	Sellards, Hoffman, Price	Stuart Price, Scissor Sisters	3:26
10.	"Sex and Violence"	Sellards, Hoffman	Stuart Price, Scissor Sisters	4:14
11.	"Night Life"	Sellards, Hoffman, Lynch, Gruen, Price	Stuart Price, Scissor Sisters	3:37
12.	"Invisible Light"	Sellards, Hoffman, Lynch, Price	Stuart Price, Scissor Sisters	6:14

iTunes deluxe edition bonus tracks
No.	Title	Length
13.	"Fire with Fire" (Digital Dog Radio Edit)	2:42
14.	"Invisible Light" (Siriusmo Remix)	4:34

Japanese bonus tracks
No.	Title	Length
13.	"Fire with Fire" (Digital Dog Radio Edit)	2:42
14.	"Invisible Light" (Stuart Price US 12" Mix)	7:27
15.	"Invisible Light" (Siriusmo Remix)	4:34

== Personnel ==
- Jake Shears – vocals
- Babydaddy – bass guitar, guitar, keyboards, programming
- Ana Matronic – vocals
- Del Marquis – guitar
- Joan Wasser – string arrangement
- Kylie Minogue – backing vocals on "Any Which Way", sample of "Can't Get You Out of My Head" on "Something Like This"
- Santi White (Santigold) – backing vocals on "Running Out"
- Ian McKellen – vocals on "Invisible Light"
- Helen Terry – backing vocals on "Whole New Way"
- Randy Real (Randy Schrager) – drums, percussion
- John "JJ" Garden – keyboards
- Stuart Price – "everything in between"

== Charts ==
=== Weekly charts ===
Weekly chart performance for Night Work
Chart (2010)	Peak position
Australian Albums (ARIA)	10
Austrian Albums (Ö3 Austria)	36
Belgian Albums (Ultratop Flanders)	43
Belgian Albums (Ultratop Wallonia)	38
Canadian Albums (Billboard)	23
Danish Albums (Hitlisten)	36
Dutch Albums (Album Top 100)	29
Finnish Albums (Suomen virallinen lista)	22
French Albums (SNEP)	19
German Albums (Offizielle Top 100)	29
Greek Albums (IFPI)	2
Irish Albums (IRMA)	11
Italian Albums (FIMI)	39
New Zealand Albums (RMNZ)	36
Norwegian Albums (VG-lista)	31
Scottish Albums (Official Charts)	2
Spanish Albums (Promusicae)	28
Swedish Albums (Sverigetopplistan)	15
Swiss Albums (Schweizer Hitparade)	12
UK Albums (Official Charts)	2
US Billboard 200	18
US Top Dance Albums (Billboard)	3
US Independent Albums (Billboard)	1

=== Year-end charts ===
Year-end chart performance for Night Work
Chart (2010)	Position
UK Albums (OCC)	98
US Top Dance/Electronic Albums (Billboard)	13

== Certifications ==
Certifications for Night Work
Region	Certification	Certified units/sales
United Kingdom (BPI)	Silver	60,000^{^}
^{‡} Sales+streaming figures based on certification alone.
