= Fire with Fire (song) =

2010 single by Scissor Sisters

Single by Scissor Sisters

from the album Night Work
- Released: June 1, 2010 (South Korea)
- Genre: Pop
- Length: 4:13 (album version); 3:41 (radio edit)
- Label: EMI; Polydor
- Songwriters: Babydaddy; Jake Shears; Stuart Price
- Producer: Stuart Price

Scissor Sisters singles chronology
"Kiss You Off" (2007)	"Fire with Fire" (2010)	"Any Which Way" (2010)

Music video
- "Fire with Fire" on YouTube

"Fire with Fire" is the first single taken from American pop band Scissor Sisters' third album, Night Work. It reached number 11 on the UK Singles Chart entered the top 40 in Austria and Ireland. The song is featured in the video game FIFA 11.

== Music video ==
The music video was directed by Philip Andelman.

Production notes

- Artist: Scissor Sisters
- Song: Fire with Fire
- Label: Polydor UK
- Director: Philip Andelman
- Production company: Partizan
- Producer: Billy Parks
- Director of photography: Omer Ganai

== Track listings ==
CD single

1. "Fire with Fire" – 4:19
2. "Invisible Light" (Siriusmo Remix) – 4:32

UK 12-inch vinyl

1. "Fire with Fire" – 4:19
2. "Fire with Fire" (Rory Phillips Remix)
3. "Fire with Fire" (a cappella)

UK iTunes EP

1. "Fire with Fire" – 4:19
2. "Fire with Fire" (Digital Dog Radio Remix) – 2:42
3. "Invisible Light" (US 12") – 7:25

Official remixes

1. "Fire with Fire" (album version) – 4:19
2. "Fire with Fire" (Digital Dog Club Mix) – 5:30
3. "Fire with Fire" (Rauhofer Reconstruction Mix) – 8:51
4. "Fire with Fire" (Digital Dog Dub) – 6:16
5. "Fire with Fire" (Digital Dog Radio Edit) – 2:42
6. "Fire with Fire" (radio edit) – 3:41

== Chart performance ==
"Fire with Fire" debuted on the Irish Singles Chart at number 25 on June 24, 2010. The single then rose nine places to its current peak of number 16 the following week. On July 9, 2010, the single fell eight places to number 24. The single also debuted at number 11 on the UK Singles Chart on June 27, 2010, marking Scissor Sisters' fourth-highest-charting single in that country. On its second week on the chart, the single fell a single place to number 12 despite the release of Night Work.

=== Weekly charts ===
Weekly chart performance for "Fire with Fire"
Chart (2010)	Peak position
Austria (Ö3 Austria Top 40)	24
Belgium (Ultratop 50 Flanders)	48
Belgium (Ultratip Bubbling Under Wallonia)	11
European Hot 100 Singles (Billboard)	29
Germany (GfK)	51
Hungary (Editors' Choice Top 40)	19
Ireland (IRMA)	16
Japan Hot 100 (Billboard Japan)	9
Netherlands (Dutch Top 40 Tipparade)	11
Netherlands (Single Top 100)	97
Scotland Singles (OCC)	7
Spanish Airplay (PROMUSICAE)	15
Sweden (Sverigetopplistan)	36
Switzerland (Schweizer Hitparade)	57
UK Singles (OCC)	11
US Dance Club Songs (Billboard)	1

=== Year-end charts ===
Year-end chart performance for "Fire with Fire"
Chart (2010)	Position
Italy (FIMI)	90
Italy Airplay (EarOne)	17
Japan Adult Contemporary (Billboard)	46
Spanish Top 20 TV (PROMUSICAE)	18
US Hot Dance Club Play (Billboard)	4

== See also ==
- List of number-one dance singles of 2010 (U.S.)
