= Take Your Mama =

2004 single by Scissor Sisters

Single by Scissor Sisters

from the album Scissor Sisters
- Released: March 29, 2004
- Length: 4:31
- Label: Universal; Polydor
- Songwriters: Babydaddy; Jake Shears
- Producer: Scissor Sisters

Scissor Sisters singles chronology
"Comfortably Numb" (2004)	"Take Your Mama" (2004)	"Laura" (2004)

Music video
- "Take Your Mama" on YouTube

"Take Your Mama" is a song by American band Scissor Sisters, included as the second track on their self-titled debut album (2004). The song, written by Babydaddy and Jake Shears, was inspired by Shears' coming out to his Southern Baptist parents. The lyrics portray a homosexual man showing his mother the activities of gay nightlife in order to bond with her following his coming out.

The single was released on March 29, 2004, peaking at number 17 on the UK Singles Chart and receiving a gold certification from the British Phonographic Industry (BPI) in July 2023. It also saw success in other regions, most notably in New Zealand, where it reached number 11 on the RIANZ Singles Chart. In Australia, where the song peaked at number 40, it was ranked number 23 on Triple J's Hottest 100 of 2004.

== Background ==
Jake Shears wrote the song based on his own experience telling his Southern Baptist parents about his sexuality during a family holiday when he was a teenager. "I was just irritated. There was nothing really for me to do there as a 17-year-old, and I just wanted to stir the pot a little bit," he said. "So I basically came out to my mom while we were doing our hair in the bathroom, getting ready to go see Michael Crawford."

He later wrote the music and lyrics while visiting his parents in Bristol, Virginia. "Sometimes my best writing actually comes out in the shower because you've got no sort of input. There's nothing there to distract you. And I'll just start singing. And I just started singing. That chorus just came out of my mouth and I jumped out. I had a little tape recorder and I grabbed it and I sang it."

== Critical reception ==
Reviewing the song in May 2004 for Billboard magazine, Keith Caulfield wrote: "Scissor Sisters' Take Your Mama is one of the most exhilarating and exciting singles to come along in recent memory. The track's rocking sing-a-long chorus is instantly memorable."

== Track listings ==
UK 12-inch single

A1. "Take Your Mama" – 4:32
B1. "Take Your Mama" (Hot Chip remix) – 5:00
B2. "Take Your Mama" (acappella) – 4:32

UK 12-inch picture disc

A1. "Take Your Mama" – 4:32
B1. "The Backwoods Discotheque, Pt. II" – 4:25
B2. "Take Your Mama" (National Forest remix) – 5:37

UK CD single

1. "Take Your Mama" – 4:32
2. "The Backwoods Discotheque, Pt. II" – 4:25

European and Australian maxi-CD single

1. "Take Your Mama" – 4:33
2. "The Backwoods Discotheque, Pt. II" – 4:25
3. "Get It Get It" – 3:48
4. "Take Your Mama" (music video)

== Charts ==
=== Weekly charts ===
Chart (2004)	Peak position
Australia (ARIA)	40
CIS Airplay (TopHit)	163
Denmark (Tracklisten)	12
Germany (GfK)	99
Greece (IFPI)	44
Hungary (Editors' Choice Top 40)	15
Ireland (IRMA)	25
Netherlands (Dutch Top 40 Tipparade)	12
Netherlands (Single Top 100)	80
New Zealand (Recorded Music NZ)	11
Russia Airplay (TopHit)	176
Scotland Singles (OCC)	10
Sweden (Sverigetopplistan)	53
UK Singles (OCC)	17
US Adult Alternative Airplay (Billboard)	7
US Adult Pop Airplay (Billboard)	23

=== Year-end charts ===
Chart (2004)	Position
US Adult Top 40 (Billboard)	73
US Triple-A (Billboard)	47

== Certifications ==
Region	Certification	Certified units/sales
New Zealand (RMNZ)	Platinum	30,000^{‡}
United Kingdom (BPI)	Gold	400,000^{‡}
^{‡} Sales+streaming figures based on certification alone.

== Release history ==
Region	Date	Format(s)	Label(s)	Ref(s).
United Kingdom	March 29, 2004	12-inch vinyl; CD	Polydor	
United States	May 10, 2004	Alternative radio	Universal	
United States	June 1, 2004	Hot adult contemporary radio	Universal	
United States	June 8, 2004	Triple A radio	Universal	
United States	August 2, 2004	Contemporary hit radio	Universal	
