= Filthy/Gorgeous =

2005 single by Scissor Sisters

Single by Scissor Sisters

from the album Scissor Sisters
- B-side: "Take Me Out"
- Released: January 3, 2005
- Studio: 5D (Brooklyn, New York); The Shed (New York)
- Genre: Hi-NRG
- Length: 3:47
- Label: Universal (US); Polydor (worldwide)
- Songwriters: Jason Sellards; Scott Hoffman; Ana Lynch
- Producer: Scissor Sisters

Scissor Sisters singles chronology
"Mary" (2004)	"Filthy/Gorgeous" (2005)	"I Don't Feel Like Dancin'" (2006)

Music video
- "Filthy/Gorgeous" on YouTube

"Filthy/Gorgeous" is a song by American pop-rock band Scissor Sisters. It is the seventh track on their self-titled debut album. Released as the album's fifth and final single in the United Kingdom on January 3, 2005, the song peaked at number five on the UK Singles Chart, making it the band's first British top-five single. It also reached number one on the UK Dance Singles Chart and on the US Billboard Dance Club Play chart. In Australia, it peaked at number 29 on the ARIA Singles Chart, and in Ireland, it reached number 13.

== Music video ==
Two versions of the music video, directed by John Cameron Mitchell, were made: a full-length, raunchier version featuring semi-explicit scenes in a sex club, and an edited version where those scenes are shown more briefly, out of context, and occasionally obscured. Some scenes are removed completely.

== Track listings ==
UK CD single

1. "Filthy/Gorgeous" – 3:48
2. "Filthy/Gorgeous" (Paper Faces vocal mix edit) – 4:26
3. "Mary" (Mylo mix) – 5:53
4. "Filthy/Gorgeous" (gorgeous video)

UK 12-inch picture disc

A1. "Filthy/Gorgeous" – 3:48
A2. "Filthy/Gorgeous" (I Love You – See You Next Tuesday mix) – 5:28
B1. "Filthy/Gorgeous" (Paper Faces mix) – 8:53

UK DVD single

1. "Filthy/Gorgeous" (filthy video)
2. "Filthy/Gorgeous" – 3:47

Australasian CD single

1. "Filthy/Gorgeous" – 3:48
2. "Take Me Out" – 4:32
3. "Filthy/Gorgeous" (Paper Faces vocal mix edit) – 4:26
4. "Filthy/Gorgeous" (I Love You – See You Next Tuesday mix) – 5:28

== Credits and personnel ==
Credits are lifted from the UK CD single liner notes and the Scissor Sisters album booklet.

Studios

- Recorded at 5D Studios (Brooklyn, New York) and The Shed (New York)

Personnel

- Scissor Sisters – performance, production, mixing
  - Jake Shears – writing (as Jason Sellards)
  - Babydaddy – writing (as Scott Hoffman), recording (5D)
  - Ana Matronic – writing (as Ana Lynch)
  - Del Marquis – guitar
  - Paddy Boom – drums
- Ayan Pal – bass
- Daniel Wise – recording (The Shed)
- Neil Harris – mixing
- Spooky – art direction, illustration
- Fury – art direction, design

== Charts ==
=== Weekly charts ===
Chart (2005)	Peak position
Australia (ARIA)	29
Ireland (IRMA)	13
Romania (Romanian Top 100)	74
Scottish Singles Sales (Official Charts)	5
UK Singles (Official Charts)	5
UK Dance (Official Charts)	1
US Dance Club Songs (Billboard)	1
US Dance Airplay (Billboard)	16

=== Year-end charts ===
Chart (2005)	Position
UK Singles (OCC)	129
US Dance Club Play (Billboard)	12

== Certifications ==
Region	Certification	Certified units/sales
United Kingdom (BPI)	Silver	200,000^{‡}
^{‡} Sales+streaming figures based on certification alone.

== Release history ==
Region	Date	Format(s)	Label(s)	Ref.
United Kingdom	January 3, 2005	12-inch vinyl; CD	Polydor	
United States	February 14, 2005	Contemporary hit radio	Universal	
Australia	April 25, 2005	CD	Polydor	

== In popular culture ==
This song appeared on the soundtrack to Tony Hawk's American Wasteland and also is the theme to the NBC show Kath & Kim. It was also used in the 2006 film It's a Boy Girl Thing and the 2014 film Dumb and Dumber To.

== See also ==
- List of number-one dance singles of 2005 (U.S.)
