= Laura (Scissor Sisters song) =

2003 single by Scissor Sisters

Single by Scissor Sisters

from the album Scissor Sisters
- B-side: "Available (For You)" (2003); "Borrowed Time" (2004)
- Released: October 27, 2003
- Length: 3:35
- Label: Universal; Polydor
- Songwriters: Babydaddy; Jake Shears
- Producer: Scissor Sisters

Scissor Sisters singles chronology
"Electrobix" (2002)	"Laura" (2003)	"Comfortably Numb" (2004)
"Take Your Mama" (2004)	"Laura" (2004)	"Mary" (2004)

"Laura" is a song by American pop rock band Scissor Sisters, included as the lead track on their self-titled debut album (2004). The song was released as the band's first single on October 27, 2003, in the United Kingdom, placing at number 54 on the UK Singles Chart. It was later re-issued in June 2004, charting at number 12 on the same chart. In Australia, the song was ranked number 58 on Triple J's Hottest 100 of 2004.

== Music video ==
There are two music videos for the song: "Version 1" and "Version 2". Version 1 was directed by Andy Soup and Version 2 was directed by Alex and Liane.

== Track listings ==
- UK 12-inch picture disc and CD single (2003)
1. "Laura" – 3:35
2. "Laura" (City Hi-Fi vocal mix) – 4:24
3. "Available (For You)" – 3:40
4. "Laura" (video—CD only)
- UK 12-inch single (2004)

A1. "Laura" (original mix) – 3:35
A2. "Laura" (acappella) – 3:35
B1. "Laura" (Paper Faces remix) – 7:49

- UK CD single (2004)
1. "Laura" – 3:35
2. "Laura" (Craig C's Vocal Dub Workout) – 6:09
- European and Australian maxi-CD single (2004)
1. "Laura" – 3:35
2. "Borrowed Time" – 4:10
3. "Laura" (Riton Re-Rub) – 6:22
4. "Laura" (video)

== Charts ==
=== Weekly charts ===
Chart (2003–2004)	Peak position
Australia (ARIA)	79
CIS Airplay (TopHit)	197
Hungary (Dance Top 40)	20
Russia Airplay (TopHit)	147
Scotland Singles (Official Charts)	5
UK Singles (Official Charts)	12
UK Dance (Official Charts)	2

Chart (2005)	Peak position
Australia (ARIA)	66

=== Year-end charts ===
Chart (2004)	Position
UK Singles (OCC)	156

== Certifications ==
Region	Certification	Certified units/sales
United Kingdom (BPI)	Silver	200,000^{‡}
^{‡} Sales+streaming figures based on certification alone.

== Release history ==
Region	Date	Format(s)	Label(s)	Ref(s)
United Kingdom	October 27, 2003	12-inch vinyl; CD	Polydor	
United Kingdom (re-release)	June 7, 2004	12-inch vinyl; CD	Polydor	
United States	October 11, 2004	Alternative radio	Universal	
United States	November 1, 2004	Contemporary hit; hot AC; triple A radio	Universal	
