= Scissor Sisters (album) =

Studio album by Scissor Sisters
- Released: February 2, 2004
- Recorded: 2002–2003
- Studios: 5D (Brooklyn, New York); The Shed (New York)
- Genres: Glam rock; electroclash; nu-disco
- Length: 43:02
- Labels: Polydor; Universal
- Producer: Scissor Sisters

Scissor Sisters chronology
The Demo Album (2003)	Scissor Sisters (2004)	Ta-Dah (2006)

Singles from Scissor Sisters
- 1. "Laura" Released: October 27, 2003; 2. "Comfortably Numb" Released: January 19, 2004; 3. "Take Your Mama" Released: March 29, 2004; 4. "Mary" Released: October 11, 2004; 5. "Filthy/Gorgeous" Released: January 3, 2005

Scissor Sisters is the debut album by American glam rock band Scissor Sisters, first released on February 2, 2004. It was released by Polydor Records in the United Kingdom and Universal Records in the United States. The album relates to LGBT life in New York City.

Scissor Sisters reached number 1 on the UK and Irish albums charts and was the best-selling album of 2004 in the UK. Since its release, it been certified 9× Platinum in the UK, selling over 2,700,000 copies in the country alone. In Ireland, it has been certified 5× Platinum. The album was not as successful in their native US, peaking at number 102 on the Billboard 200. As of February 2007, it has sold 299,000 copies in United States. Scissor Sisters has sold 3,300,000 copies worldwide, and is listed in the book 1001 Albums You Must Hear Before You Die, edited by Robert Dimery.

The album won Best International Album at the 2005 BRIT Awards. In July 2006 it was named by Attitude as the top "gay album" of all time.

== Release history ==
The album was first released on CD, and was given a limited vinyl release in Europe. Cassette versions were only released in Indonesia, Malaysia and Russia. In 2015, Dutch vinyl reissue label Music on Vinyl re-released the album on LP. Polydor reissued the album in early 2019 as a "half-speed mastered" audiophile release. This would be repressed on green vinyl as a "20th anniversary edition".

On July 18, 2025, the album was released as a three-CD "21st anniversary edition", featuring the UK bonus tracks from the original CD release in that country, B-sides, demo tracks and remixes. The 21st anniversary edition was also released as a double album, with the first disc once again pressed from the half-speed masters of the 2019 and 2024 releases and the second disc containing the UK bonus tracks, demos and B-sides.

== Critical reception ==
Professional ratings
Aggregate scores
Source	Rating
Metacritic	81/100
Review scores
Source	Rating
AllMusic	4.5/5 stars
Blender	4/5 stars
The Guardian	4/5 stars
Mojo	2/5 stars
NME	9/10
Pitchfork	8.3/10
Q	4/5 stars
Rolling Stone	3/5 stars
Uncut	5/5 stars
The Village Voice	B+

At Metacritic, which assigns a normalized rating out of 100 to reviews from mainstream critics, the album received an average score of 81, which indicates "universal acclaim".

== Track listing ==
All songs were produced by Scissor Sisters.

Scissor Sisters track listing
No.	Title	Writer(s)	Length
1.	"Laura"	Scott Hoffman, Jason Sellards	3:36
2.	"Take Your Mama"	Hoffman, Sellards	4:31
3.	"Comfortably Numb" (Pink Floyd cover)	David Gilmour, Roger Waters	4:25
4.	"Mary"	Hoffman, Sellards	4:43
5.	"Lovers in the Backseat"	Hoffman, Sellards	3:15
6.	"Tits on the Radio"	Hoffman, Ana Lynch, Sellards	3:16
7.	"Filthy/Gorgeous"	Hoffman, Lynch, Sellards	3:46
8.	"Music Is the Victim"	Derek Gruen, Hoffman, Sellards	2:57
9.	"Better Luck"	Gruen, Hoffman, Sellards	3:08
10.	"It Can't Come Quickly Enough"	Hoffman, Sellards	4:42
11.	"Return to Oz"	Hoffman, Sellards	4:39

UK bonus tracks
No.	Title	Writer(s)	Length
12.	"A Message from Ms. Matronic" (unlisted hidden track)	Hoffman, Sellards	0:31
13.	"The Skins"	Hoffman, Sellards	2:55
14.	"Get It Get It"	Hoffman, Sellards, Michael Nyman	3:47

US iTunes bonus track
No.	Title	Writer(s)	Length
12.	"Get It Get It"	Hoffman, Sellards, Nyman	3:47

== Personnel ==
- Jake Shears – lead vocals, piano on "Laura"
- Babydaddy – bass guitar, keyboards, guitar, backing vocals
- Ana Lynch (Ana Matronic) – lead vocals
- Del Marquis – guitar, bass guitar
- Paddy Boom – drums, percussion

== Charts ==
=== Weekly charts ===
Weekly chart performance for Scissor Sisters
Chart (2004–2005)	Peak position
Australian Albums (ARIA)	7
Austrian Albums (Ö3 Austria)	75
Belgian Albums (Ultratop Flanders)	81
Danish Albums (Hitlisten)	18
Dutch Albums (Album Top 100)	67
Finnish Albums (Suomen virallinen lista)	40
French Albums (SNEP)	100
Icelandic Albums (Tónlist)	22
Irish Albums (IRMA)	1
Norwegian Albums (VG-lista)	33
Portuguese Albums (AFP)	19
Scottish Albums (Official Charts)	1
Spanish Albums (Promusicae)	70
Swedish Albums (Sverigetopplistan)	13
UK Albums (Official Charts)	1
US Billboard 200	102
US Top Dance Albums (Billboard)	1

=== Year-end charts ===
Year-end chart performance for Scissor Sisters
Chart (2004)	Position
Irish Albums (IRMA)	12
Swedish Albums (Sverigetopplistan)	94
UK Albums (OCC)	1
US Top Dance/Electronic Albums (Billboard)	6
Worldwide Albums (IFPI)	40
Chart (2005)	Position
Australian Albums (ARIA)	61
UK Albums (OCC)	17
US Top Dance/Electronic Albums (Billboard)	5
Chart (2006)	Position
UK Albums (OCC)	91

=== Decade-end charts ===
Decade-end chart performance for Scissor Sisters
Chart (2000–2009)	Position
UK Albums (OCC)	9

== Certifications ==
Certifications for Scissor Sisters
Region	Certification	Certified units/sales
Australia (ARIA)	Platinum	70,000^{^}
Denmark (IFPI Danmark)	Gold	20,000^{^}
Ireland (IRMA)	5× Platinum	75,000^{^}
United Kingdom (BPI)	9× Platinum	2,760,000
Summaries
Europe (IFPI)	3× Platinum	3,000,000^{*}
^{*} Sales figures based on certification alone.^{^} Shipments figures based on certification alone.

== Release history ==
Release history for Scissor Sisters
Country	Date
United Kingdom	February 2, 2004
United States	July 27, 2004

== See also ==
- List of best-selling albums of the 2000s (decade) in the United Kingdom
