= Babydaddy =

American musical artist (born 1976)

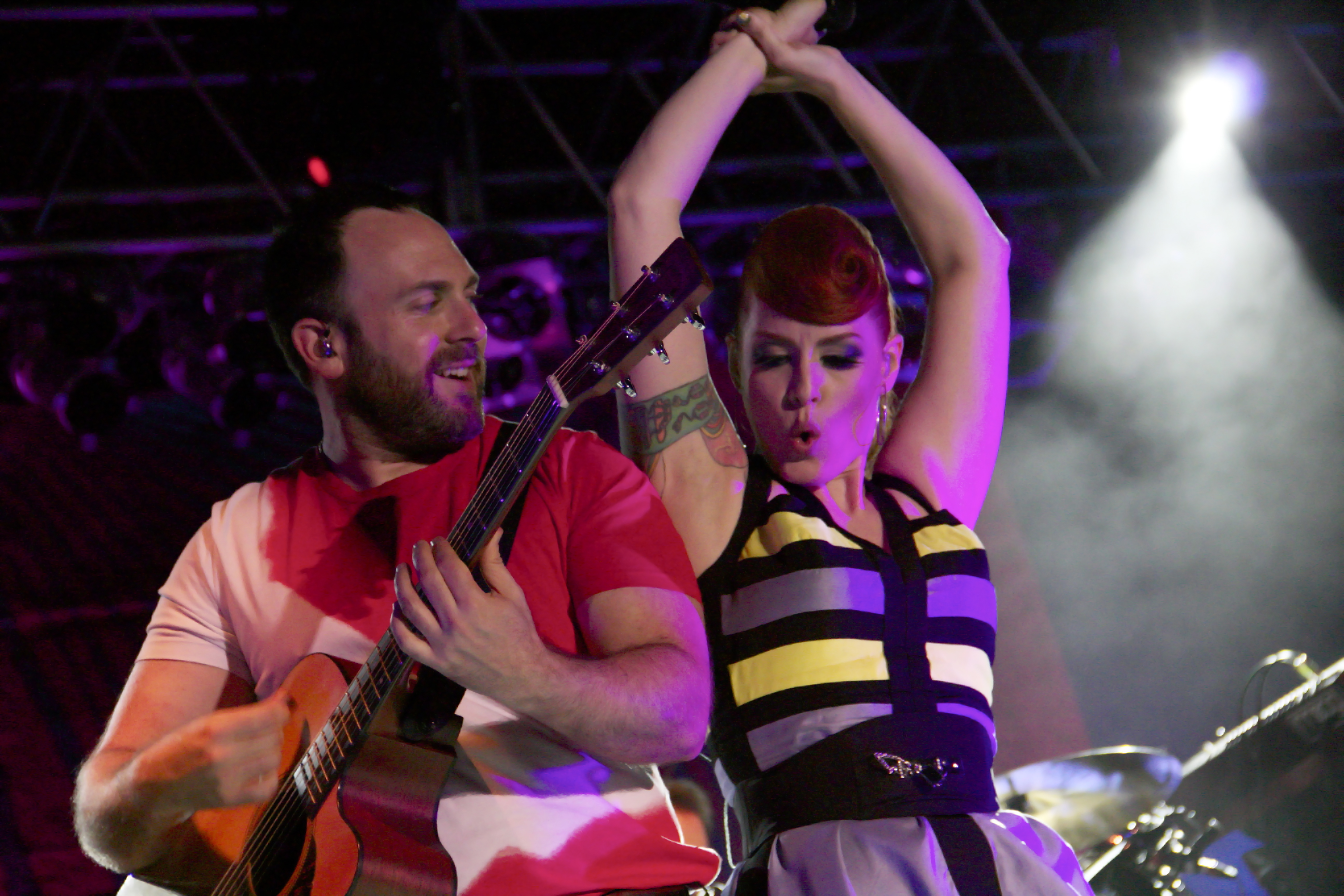
- Babydaddy (left) with Ana Matronic in 2012

Background information
- Born: Scott Hoffman; September 1, 1976 (age 49); Houston, Texas, U.S.
- Genres: Glam rock, alternative, pop
- Occupations: Musician, songwriter
- Instruments: Bass guitar, keyboards and piano, saxophone, guitar, vocals, banjo, melodica
- Years active: 1999–present
- Member of: Scissor Sisters

Scott Hoffman (born September 1, 1976), known by his stage name Babydaddy, is an American musician and the Ivor Novello Award-winning multi-instrumentalist, backing vocalist and composer for the U.S. glam rock band Scissor Sisters. He is the brother of comedian and musician Ben Hoffman.

== Early life and education ==
Born in Houston, Texas, to a Jewish family, Hoffman lived most of his childhood in Lexington, Kentucky, attending Henry Clay High School. He attended Columbia University, where he studied writing and music production and subsequently worked in the field of dance music. He graduated from Columbia in 1999.

== Career ==
He had previously met Jake Shears—then still known as Jason Sellards—through a childhood friend, and Hoffman asked Shears to provide vocals for his tracks. When Hoffman moved to New York to study writing at Columbia, the duo officially joined forces in 2001 and took stage names to become the first two members of "Scissor Sisters", a lesbian euphemism, whose pop-rock music is deeply inspired by drag and LGBTQ+ culture. At the time, the band was just a combination of Babydaddy's music and Shears's vocal and visual performances. The band logo was designed by Babydaddy. Since then, the band has recruited further members and Babydaddy has continued to serve as the keyboardist and bassist. The group has expanded its original musical style to cover the rock, disco and dance music genres. They toured the UK, Europe, and the U.S. in 2004, including a Glastonbury Music Festival performance. The band was nominated for a Grammy in Best Dance Record for their single "Comfortably Numb" in late 2004.

Babydaddy plays a number of instruments including keyboards, guitar, bass and banjo; he and Shears are the main lyricists for the band. The two also wrote the hit single "I Believe in You" for Kylie Minogue, as well as the title track from her documentary White Diamond. Babydaddy has also co-produced with other artists including Tiga and Xavier and has produced remixes (alongside Jake Shears under the Scissor Sisters moniker) for Pet Shop Boys, The Ones and Blondie. In 2010, Babydaddy remixed disco icon Amanda Lear's single "I'm Coming Up".

In 2016, under his own name, Hoffman produced and co-wrote alongside Dev Hynes and Nicola Roberts "Ghetto Boy" for Tinashe's second studio album Nightride.

== Discography ==
Year	Artist	Album	Credit
2004	Scissor Sisters	Scissor Sisters	Co-producer, Co-writer, Band Member ("Laura", "Take Your Mama", "Comfortably Numb"(Pink Floyd Cover), "Whatever", "Mary", "Filthy Gorgeous")
2005	Kylie Minogue	Ultimate Kylie	Co-producer, Co-writer ("I Believe in You")
2007	Kylie Minogue	X	Co-producer, Co-writer ("White Diamond")
2010	Bryan Ferry	Olympia	Co-writer("Heartache By Numbers")
2010	Scissor Sisters	Night Work	Co-producer, Co-writer, Band Member ("Fire with Fire", "Any Which Way")
2012	Scissor Sisters	Magic Hour	Co-producer, Co-writer, Band Member ("Only The Horses", "Baby Come Home", "Let's Have a Kiki")
2014	Betty Who	Take Me When You Go	Co-writer ("Take Me When You Go")
2014	Kylie Minogue	Single	Co-producer, Co-Writer(Crystallize)
2014	Ferras	Ferras (EP)	Co-Writer, ("Speak in Tongues")
2014	Cheryl Cole (Ft. Joel Compass)	Only Human	Co-Producer, Co-Writer ("Coming Up For Air")
2014	Chris Brown (Ft. Ariana Grande)	X	Co-Producer, Co-Writer, Musician ("Don't Be Gone Too Long")
2015	Escort	Animal Nature	Co-Writer("Helium", "Temptation")
2015	Hurts	Surrender	Co-Writer ("SOS", "Perfect Timing")
2015	Evvy	Single	Co-Writer ("Tidal Wave")
2015	Laura Welsh	Soft Control	Co-Writer("Break The Fall", "Betrayal", "God Keeps")
2015	ALunaGeorge	Single	Co-Writer ("Supernatural")
2015	Melanie Martinez	Cry Baby	Producer, Co-Writer ("Training Wheels")
2015	Demi Lovato	Confident	Co-Producer, Co-Writer ("Old Ways")
2016	Sizzy Rocks	THRILLS	Co-Writer, Co-Producer( "Bestie", "Boy", "Bad Kids")
2016	SongBirds	Kill Your Friends Soundtrack	Co-Writer ("The Sun Goes Down")
2016	Betsy	Fair EP	Co-Writer ("Time")
2016	Ladyhawke	Wild Things	Co-Writer("Another Planet", "Chills")
2016	Frenship	Single	Co-Writer ("Capsize")
2016	Bright Light Bright Light	Choreography	Co-Producer, Co-Writer ("Home")
2016	Fantasia	The Definition Of...	Co-Writer ("Wait For You")
2016	Tinashe	Night Ride	Co-Writer("Ghetto Boy")
2017	White	One Night Stand Forever	Co-Writer ("This is not a Love Song")
2017	The Great Indoors (Television Series)	CBS	Co-Composer

== Personal life ==
Babydaddy is gay. He is the younger brother of comedian Ben Hoffman.

== Sources ==
- Babydaddy Interview on Silent Uproar
- Dallas Observer
- We Are Scissor Sisters... And So Are You
