= Louhi =

Finnish goddess of death and disease

- Mistress of Pohjola; Maiden of Pohjola
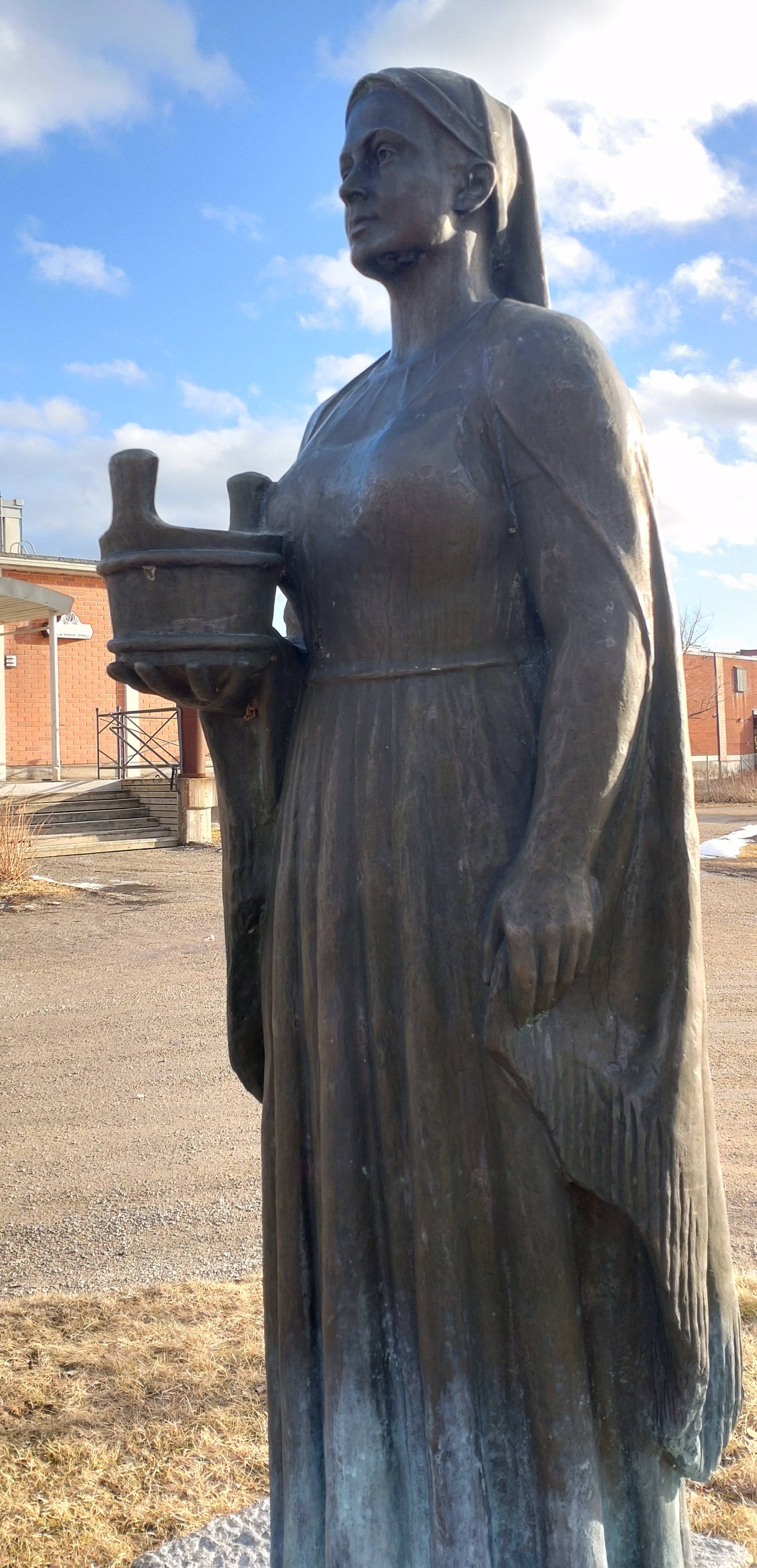
- Mistress of Pohjola, Eemil Halonen (1940)
- Other names: Forest Finns: Loho, Luukka; Kainuu: Louki, Syvätär; Karelia: Lavekämmen, Laviatar, Lavokämmen, Lohetar, Lohettari, Lohiatar, Lohjatar, Lohja-tartta, Lokahatar, Louhetar, Louhutar, Loveatar, Lovehetar, Lovetar, Loviatar, Loviitar, Lovin eukko, Loviotar, Lovviitar, Luovatar, Penitar, Peniätär, Syvätär, Äkäätär; Ostrobothnia: Laviatar, Louhiatar, Lovehetar; Savonia: Lakeitar, Launavatar, Louhiatar, Louhietar, Loveatar, Lovia, Loviatar, Ähyttär, Ähötäri, Äijötär
- Abode: Pohjola
- Animals: Wolf
- Gender: Female
- Ethnic group: Finns, Karelians
- Offspring: Nine diseases, wolves

Equivalents
- Sámi: Jábmiidáhkká

Louhi (Finnish pronunciation: [ˈlou̯hi]; alternate names include Loviatar (Finnish pronunciation: [ˈloʋiɑtɑr]), Loveatar, Lovetar, Lovehetar, Louhetar and Louhiatar) is the ruler of Pohjola in Finnish mythology. She is regarded as a goddess of death and disease. She is also the mother of wolves. Her original role was likely as the ruler of the underworld.

In Kalevala, Elias Lönnrot split Louhi into two different characters, Louhi and Loviatar, describing Louhi as a wicked queen of Pohjola and Loviatar as a blind daughter of Tuoni. In Runo 45 of the Kalevala, Loviatar is impregnated by a great wind and gives birth to nine sons, the Nine diseases.

== Name ==
The many variations of her name are connected to the word lovi ("notch, crack"). In Finnish, the term langeta loveen ("to fall into lovi") means "to fall into a trance". According to Christfried Ganander, falling into lovi means a state of ecstasy and a journey to the underworld, which he compared with Sámi shamanism. Martti Haavio connected her name to North Germanic flog "fly", via louhikäärme (dragon), from Old Swedish: floghdraki ("fly-dragon"), identifying her as a flying being. In the Finnish dialects of the Karelian Isthmus, louhi meant "lightning", which could connect the word to the concepts of fire and flames, but it is not certain if this in turn is connected to lovi in the sense of "trance". Kaarle Krohn wondered if an agent noun of lovi, lovehtija, could be the origin of the agent noun loihtija ("spellcaster").

== In runic songs ==
She was a maiden (Pohjolan impi) who refused to marry any man but, when in water, was impregnated by a sea giant, giving birth to the diseases and ailments of the world. After this, she became the Mistress of Pohjola. In some versions of the poem of the birth of diseases, she is impregnated by wind instead. She then proceeds to name or baptize the children herself, giving them the names of diseases and disasters. She also often gives birth to a tenth child, who is a girl. In some songs, the daughter in question is named Syöjätär.

In one Ostrobothnian version collected by Elias Lönnrot, Pohjolan impi gives birth to Väinämöinen.

In spells related to burn wounds, Pohjolan impi is asked to bring cold to the wound.

Multiple different takes on her exist in runic songs. In a song from South Savo, she is from Ostrobothnia and marries Väinämöinen, who is from Savonia and takes her there. This is why she is called Väinätär. She has a son, and when he is 15 years old, she sends him to bring her inheritance from Ostrobothnia with the help of a black dog she also gave birth to. In this version, Lovehetar had a daughter, and this daughter was the one who got impregnated in water. Giving birth to a black dog is a symbol of ultimate evil, since in European tradition, a black dog is a form of the Devil.

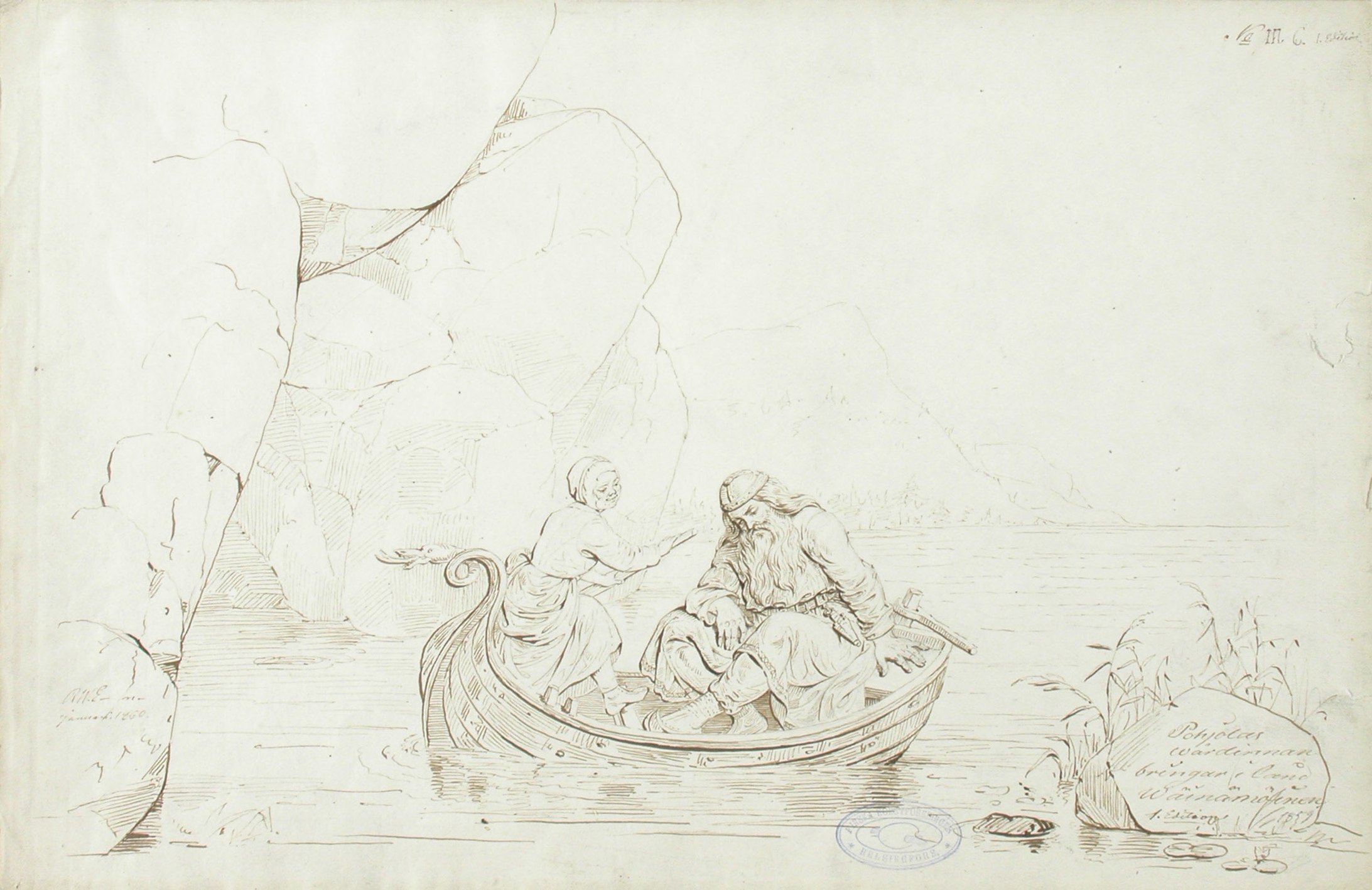
"Louhi saves Väinämöinen" by Robert Wilhelm Ekman (1859–1860)

In a song from Kainuu, she is not married, but her relation to Väinämöinen is still not adversarial: after Väinämöinen was shot and he drifted to Pohjola with the River of Tuoni, Mistress of Pohjola hears his cries and recognizes them to be those of a hero. She helps him by bringing him to her house and giving him food. In White Karelian songs, after hearing his cries, she instead promises to give him a maiden to marry if he forges for her the sampo.

In White Karelian songs, the sampo is akin to a machine which gives riches to Pohjola, so Väinämöinen and allies (who they are differs based on the song) decide to steal it. The heroes bring it to their boat, but Louhi transforms into a kokko bird and begins to chase them. One of the heroes cuts off the bird's toes, which causes the sampo to fall into the waters in three pieces. In a Forest Finnish version of the myth, the sampo itself flies out of the boat into the clouds and Joukahainen jumps after it and strikes it with his sword. He only manages to cut off two toes from the sampo, one which fell into the sea, making it salty, and the other fell on land, making wild hay grow. If only he had been able to cut off more toes, crops would grow on their own without the need of farming. Kaarle Krohn saw this as a description where the sampo and Louhi had fused into one, like sampo itself was a bird. Väinö Salminen pointed out the Forest Finn belief that storm itself was an evil being, a storm bird from Pohjola, like it was the storm bird which had taken the sampo from Väinämöinen and Joukahainen's boat.

=== As a shaman in bird form ===
Tradition knows a raven-like bird called lievo or vaaka bird, related to Sámi vuokko bird, a shaman's bird form. More common is the kokko eagle, who came from Pohjola (Turjan lintu), whose description is similar to Karelian descriptions of Louhi turning into a vaaka bird. The Forest Finn Kaisa Vilhunen told folklorists that kokko eagle is Ukko's helper. It drove away the raven-form Loho, for if she was allowed to stand on a pole on a yard, it was a sign that wolves were coming to devour cattle. This is why Forest Finns had a lykkylauta shelf as an altar for Ukko worship, as they kept a wood grouse's wing on the shelf to drive away Loho and to please Ukko. Loho was the adversary of Ukko and Väinämöinen, and she lived on Kalmanmäki (Hill of Death) with her servants. Kokko spews fire and could therefore be related to ideas of the thunderbird.

== Descriptions ==
In 1782, Christian Erici Lencqvist described "Louhi or Loveatar or Lovehetar" as the mother of disasters, but also someone who can prevent them, so she was asked to help. He also wrote: "it is likely that she is the wife of the north wind". Ganander wrote she is described as an "angry witch" and compared her to Pandora and Proserpina without explaining further. Matthias Castrén wrote that Louhi, with her name and hostility, seems similar to Loki, while Eemil Nestor Setälä thought Louhi is the same as Laufey. While the latter theory received some support, Jan de Vries denied it completely in 1953. K. B. Wiklund claimed Louhi is a dragon, because the Finnish word for dragon is lohikäärme or louhikäärme (from Old Swedish floghdrake "flying dragon"). Before his Laufey theory, Setälä had connected Loviatar to the word lovi "magical ecstasy", and Krohn wrote her role is that of an old wife of a Sámi shaman going into a trance.

Krohn also connected Louhi with Herodias, who is called a "harlot" in Germanic folklore. In Italy, it was said that she had 12 children. She is sometimes called the bride of wind and was connected to Diana during the Middle Ages. Uno Harva told Krohn in 1910 of a "widespread legend in Russia" of the 12 daughters of Herod and Herodias who turned into diseases. Martti Haavio wrote that Louhi's epithet "harlot" came from Herodias who, according to legend, was a wife of Phillip and had an adulterous relationship with king Herod. Herodias also had a connection to John the Baptist, and Christianized versions of the song of the birth of Nine diseases often feature him and mention a deeply corrupted name such as Nikotiera mieron huora ("Nikotiera whore of the world"), which Krohn and Haavio have connected to Herodias. Haavio further connected Louhi to an international tradition of flying, sea and darkness related mothers of demons, such as Lilith, Tiamat and Nyx. Thus, it is also on par for Louhi to be the ruler of the underworld: the same goes for many other mothers of demons, such as the Manichaean Az.

Anna-Leena Siikala pointed out Louhi's role as a female ruler of the underworld and "daughter of Tuoni", comparing her to Hel. Louhi is also described to be in possession of great riches. The idea of a powerful and rich witch woman living in the far north and possessing the ability to transform into a bird is a part of an early, shared Nordic tradition. For instance, Norwegian folklore knows of the far northern land Trollebotn and its female witch. Louhi's role as the ruler of her house and commander of her forces portray an early Baltic Finnic understanding of societal order.

Siikala called Louhi "a neighbour of death, the personification of cold and a sender of frost, the birther of demons and beasts and the first noita" ("shaman, witch"), fitting the image of extreme evil. As Loveatar is the one who gave birth to wolves, Siikala also drew comparisons to Loki. In Savonian tradition, Louhi's wealth is not limited to coins, but extends to game and anything the forest can offer as well.

According to Risto Pulkkinen, a female ruler of the underworld likely wasn't the original concept in Proto-Uralic religion but this development happened in order to portray how everything was the opposite in the underworld (men rule in the realm of the living, women in the realm of the dead). The same goes for the Sámi female ruler of the underworld, Jábmiidáhkká.

== Epithets ==
Epithet	Epithet meaning	Regions
Portto Pohjolan emäntä Portto Pohjulan emäntä Kartta Pohjolan emäntä	'Harlot Mistress of Pohjola'	Central Finland, Kainuu, Ladoga Karelia, North Karelia, North Savo, Ostrobothnia, South Karelia, South Savo, White Karelia
Louhi Pohjolan emäntä Louki Pohjolan emäntä	'Louhi, Mistress of Pohjola'	Kainuu, North Karelia, Ostrobothnia, South Savo, White Karelia
Paha akka raivokerta Haon akka raivokerta Akka vanha raivokerta	'Evil woman, rage layer' 'Woman of the notch, rage layer' 'Old woman, rage layer'	Kainuu, North Karelia, North Savo
Pohjon akka raivopyörä	'Woman of north, rage wheel'	White Karelia
Akka vanha villikerta	'Old woman wild layer'	North Savo
Pohjan akka harvahammas	'Gap-tooth (old) woman of north'	Kainuu, Ladoga Karelia, North Ostrobothnia, Olonets Karelia, South Savo, White Karelia
Porotyttö, Pohjan akka Porotyttö, Pohjan neito Porotyttö, Pohjan eukko	'Ash girl, woman of North' 'Ash girl, maiden of North'	Central Finland, Kainuu, Ladoga Karelia, Lapland, North Karelia, North Ostrobothnia, Olonets Karelia, South Karelia, South Savo
Tulen tyttö, Pohjan neito Tulen tuttu, Pohjan neito	'Girl of fire, maiden of North' 'Familiar to fire, maiden of North'	Central Finland, White Karelia
Pohjan tyttö, Pohjan neito Lapin tyttö, Pohjan neito	'Girl of North, maiden of North' 'Girl of Lapland, maiden of North'	Central Finland
Poro Hiisi Pohjan neito	'Ash Hiisi maiden of North'	Central Finland
Kipu tyttö, Pohjan neiti	'Pain girl, miss of North'	North Karelia
Pohjan neiti, kylmä tyttö	'Miss of North, cold girl'	Kainuu
Musta tytti, Pohjan neiti	'Black girl, miss of North'	Kainuu
Lapin ämmä, Pohjolan emäntä	'Old mother of Lapland, Mistress of Pohjola'	Central Finland
Hiien entinen emäntä	'Former mistress of hiisi'	Central Finland
Tulen entinen emäntä	'Former mistress of fire'	Central Finland
Pohjolan pitkä akka	'Tall woman of Pohjola'	Kainuu
Läpi lauto, lännen vaimo	'Thoroughly a whore, woman of west'	South Savo
Louhi Pohjolainen	'Louhi of Pohjola'	South Karelia
Porolainen Pohjan neito	'North maiden of ash'	North Ostrobothnia
Lokahatar, vaimo vankka	'Lokahatar, sturdy woman'	Ladoga Karelia, Olonets Karelia, North Karelia
Loveätar, vaimo vanha Loveatar, vanha vaimo Launavatar, vaimo vanha Syvätär, vaimo vanha	'Loveatar, old woman'	Ladoga Karelia, North Karelia, North Savo, Ostrobothnia, South Savo
Luonnotar, lihava vaimo	'Luonnotar, fat woman'	North Karelia
Loveatar, luonnon vaimo Loviatar, luonnon vaimo Loviatar luonnon akka	'Loveatar, woman of nature'	North Karelia, North Savo, Karelian Isthmus, South Savo
Äijötär, äkeä akka Ähyttär, äkäjä vaimo	'Äijötär, irked woman'	North Savo, South Savo
Loveatar lemmon vaimo	'Loveatar lempo's woman'	North Karelia, North Savo
Loviatar, lemmon luoma	'Loviatar, created by lempo'	North Karelia
Lohetar, piru pagana	'Lohetar, demon pagan'	Olonets Karelia
Lohiatar, vaimo kaunis	'Lohiatar, beautiful woman'	Ladoga Karelia
Akka pirtin pohjalainen	'Woman at the bottom of the cabin'	North Karelia
Piru pirtin pohjimmainen	'Demon, bottom-most of the cabin'	North Karelia
Lapin huora	'Whore of Lapland'	Kainuu
Luojan vaimo	'God's woman'	Ladoga Karelia
Salaneito, huorivaimo	'Secret maiden, whore woman'	Central Finland

== In the Kalevala ==
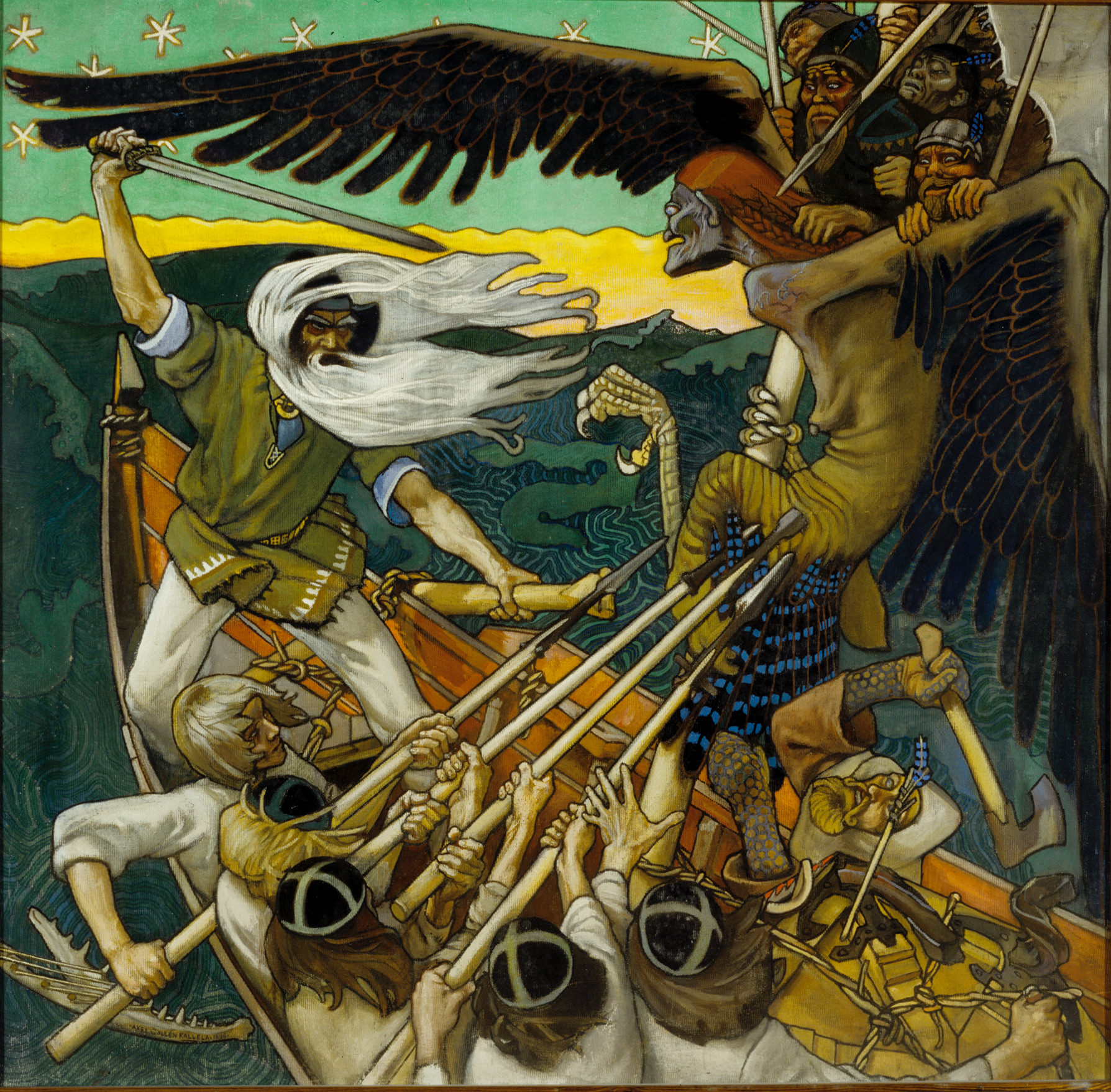
Mistress of the North, Louhi attacking Väinämöinen in the form of a giant eagle with her troops on her back. (The Defense of the Sampo, Akseli Gallen-Kallela, 1896)

When Elias Lönnrot compiled the Kalevala, he made Loviatar and Louhi two different characters. However, in the runic songs from which he compiled the epic, the names are often used interchangeably, and in some songs Louhi herself is the mother of the nine diseases. Other songs give Loviatar the title "Whore Mistress of Pohjola".

Kalevala's Louhi is described as a powerful and evil witch queen ruling over the northern realm of Pohjola, with the ability to change shape and weave mighty enchantments. She is also the main opponent of Väinämöinen and his group in the battle for the magical artifact Sampo. She has a number of beautiful daughters, whom Ilmarinen, Lemminkäinen and other heroes attempt to win the hands in marriage of. In true fairy tale form, Louhi sets them difficult-to-impossible tasks to perform in order to claim such a prize, which leads to the forging of the Sampo.

Loviatar appears in Rune 45:

The blind daughter of Tuoni,
Old and wicked witch, Lowyatar,
Worst of all the Death-land women,
Ugliest of Mana's children,
Source of all the host of evils,
All the ills and plagues of Northland,
Black in heart, and soul, and visage,
Evil genius of Lappala,
Made her couch along the wayside,
On the fields of sin and sorrow;
Turned her back upon the East-wind,
To the source of stormy weather,
To the chilling winds of morning.

— Kalevala, Rune XLV, from the translation by John Martin Crawford

There is one difference between Louhi and the various forms of Loviatar in the songs: Loviatar's name occurs only in spells where diseases are banished to go back to her, while Louhi's name occurs also in epic or narrative songs. She gives quests to heroes, and opposes Lemminkäinen in a spell contest. One hypothesis is that Louhi and Loviatar were regional variants of the same goddess, and that the epic songs were composed in an area where Louhi was the primary name. A large portion of the epic songs about the Mistress of Pohjola do not give her any name.

== In popular culture ==
- Louhi is the main antagonist in the Finnish-Soviet film Sampo, played by Anna Orochko.
- There is an orchestral work Louhi by the Finnish composer Kalevi Aho, and the wind orchestral work Louhi's Spells / Louhen loitsut by Finnish composer Tomi Räisänen.
- Louhi is track 5 on Kesto, recorded by Pan Sonic.
- Louhi was an inspiration for a foe of Conan the Barbarian's in the Marvel comics version of the character (no such foe ever appears in Howard's stories)
- Final Fantasy: The 4 Heroes of Light features Louhi the Witch of the North as a boss, Final Fantasy XI features the item Louhi's Mask, and Final Fantasy XIV features Louhi as a powerful ice enemy.
- Louhi is the main antagonist of Michael Scott Rohan's fantasy trilogy The Winter of the World.
- Louhi is one of the names of the witch Iggwilv in the Dungeons & Dragons game's Greyhawk campaign by Gary Gygax. In his book Sea of Death, Iggwilv is mentioned as being called Louhi on an alternate Earth. Louhi is also mentioned in the supplement Deities & Demigods for the first edition of Advanced Dungeons & Dragons, as character part of the Finnish mythos.
- Louhi is a song and music video by the Finnish folk band Värttinä featuring Sari Kaasinen, released in 2021.
- Louhi is a summonable Berserker-class Servant in the mobile game Fate/Grand Order.

== Gallery ==
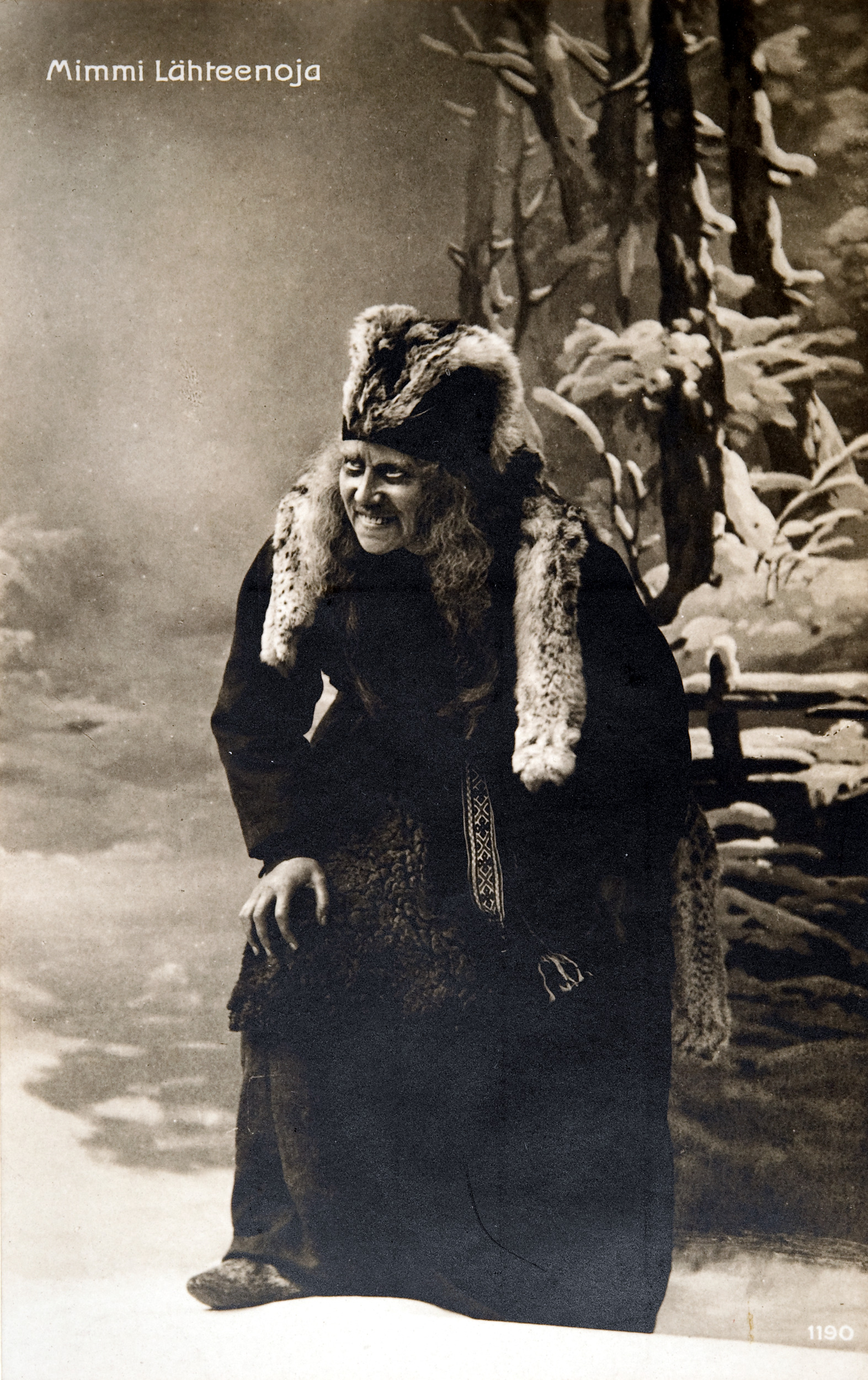
Actress Mimmi Lähteenoja as Louhi (1902)

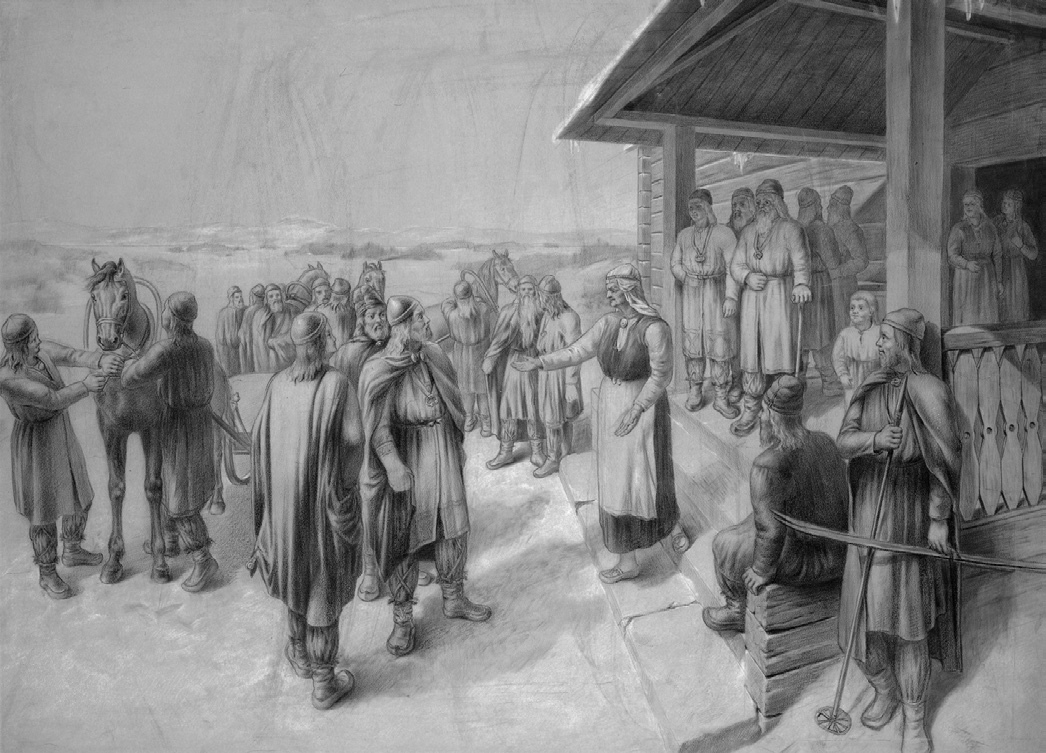
Ilmarinen Arrives as the Groom at Pohjola, charcoal work by Johan Kortman, 1893

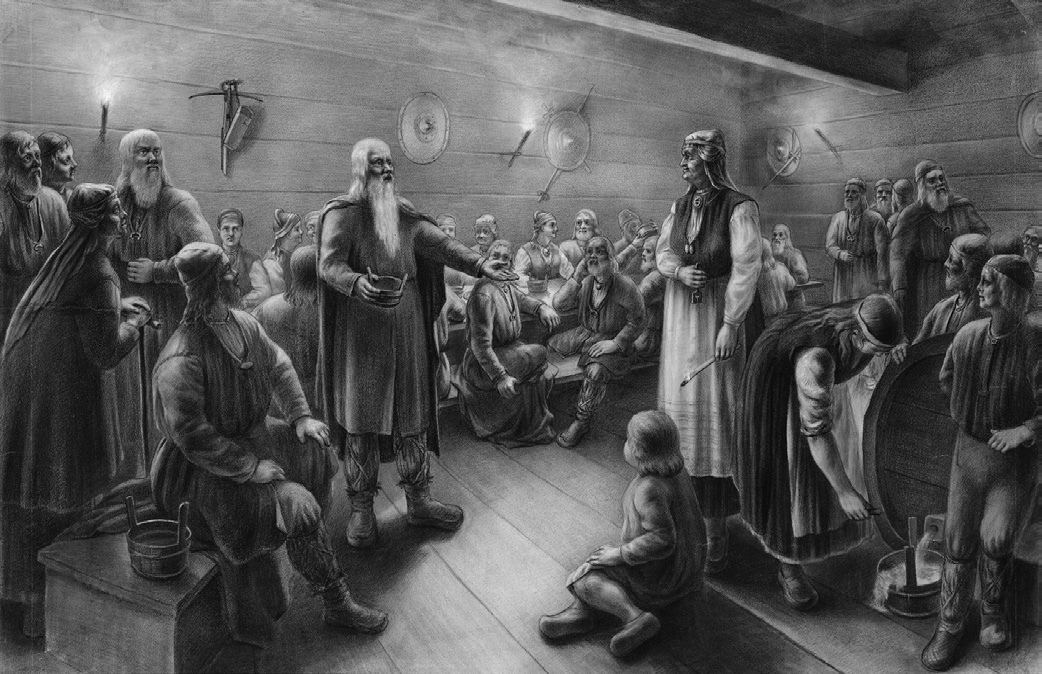
The Wedding at Pohjola, Johan Kortman, 1890

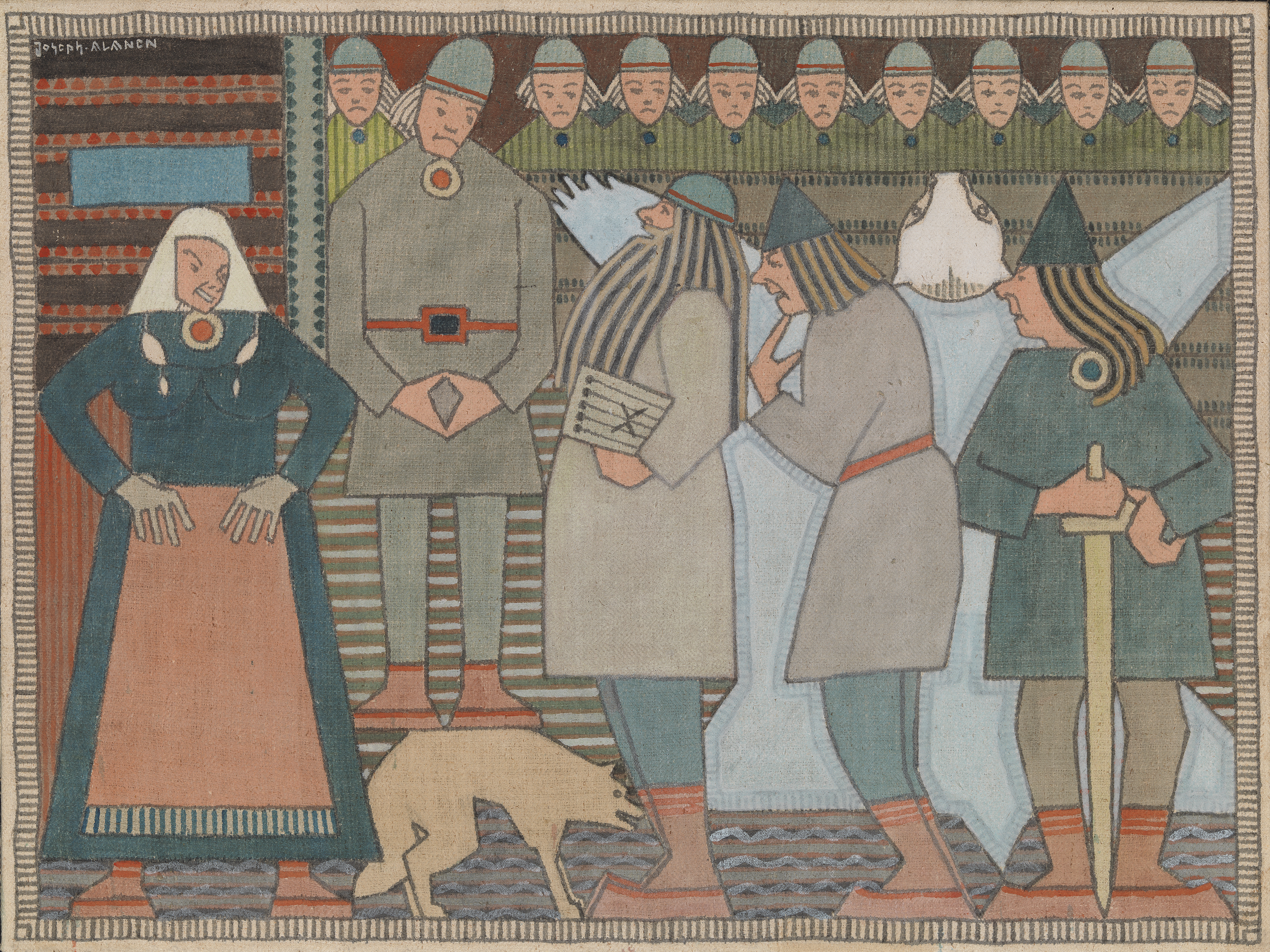
Arrival of Väinämöinen, Ilmarinen and Lemminkäinen at Pohjola, tempera by Joseph Alanen

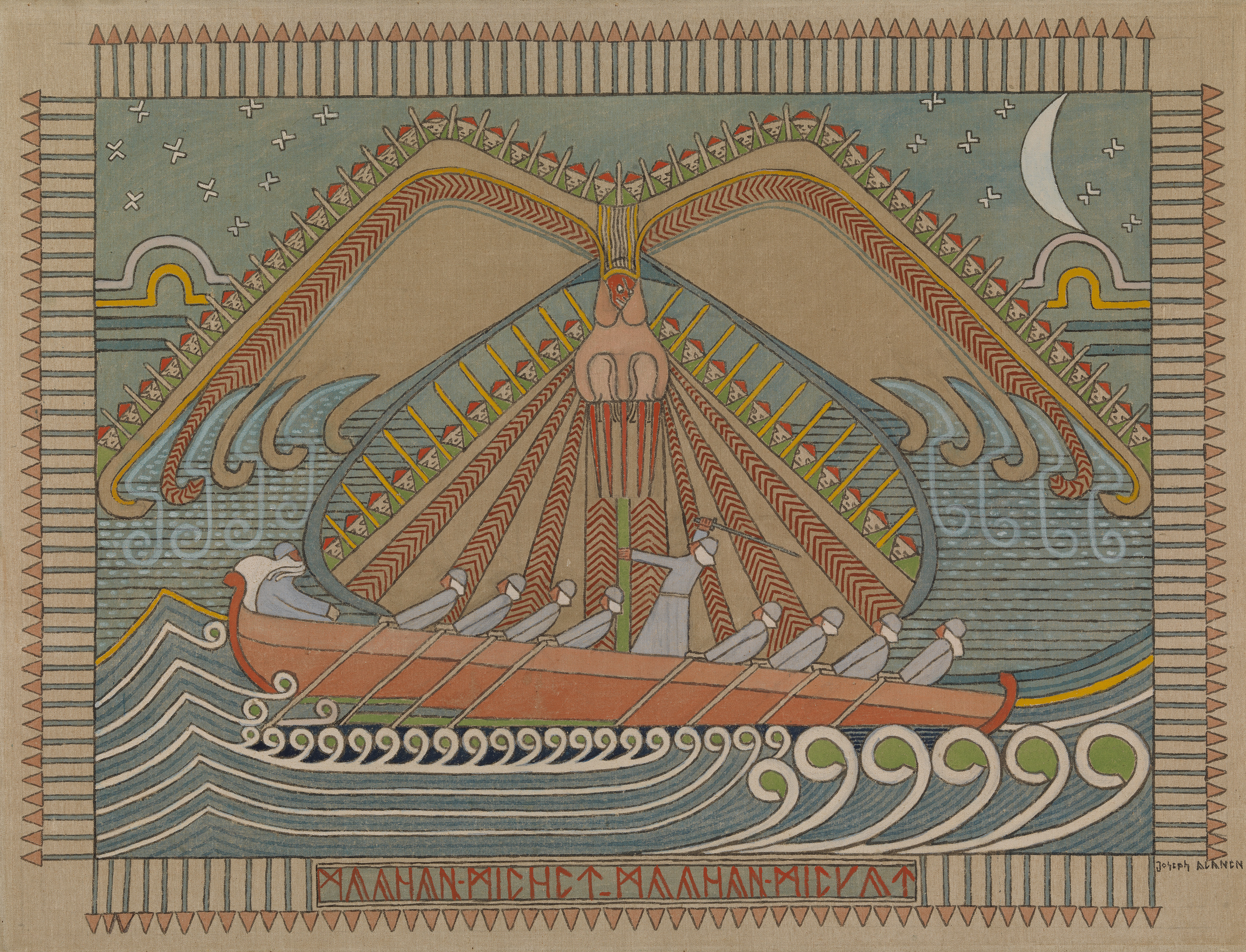
The Defence of the Sampo, Joseph Alanen, 1910–1912

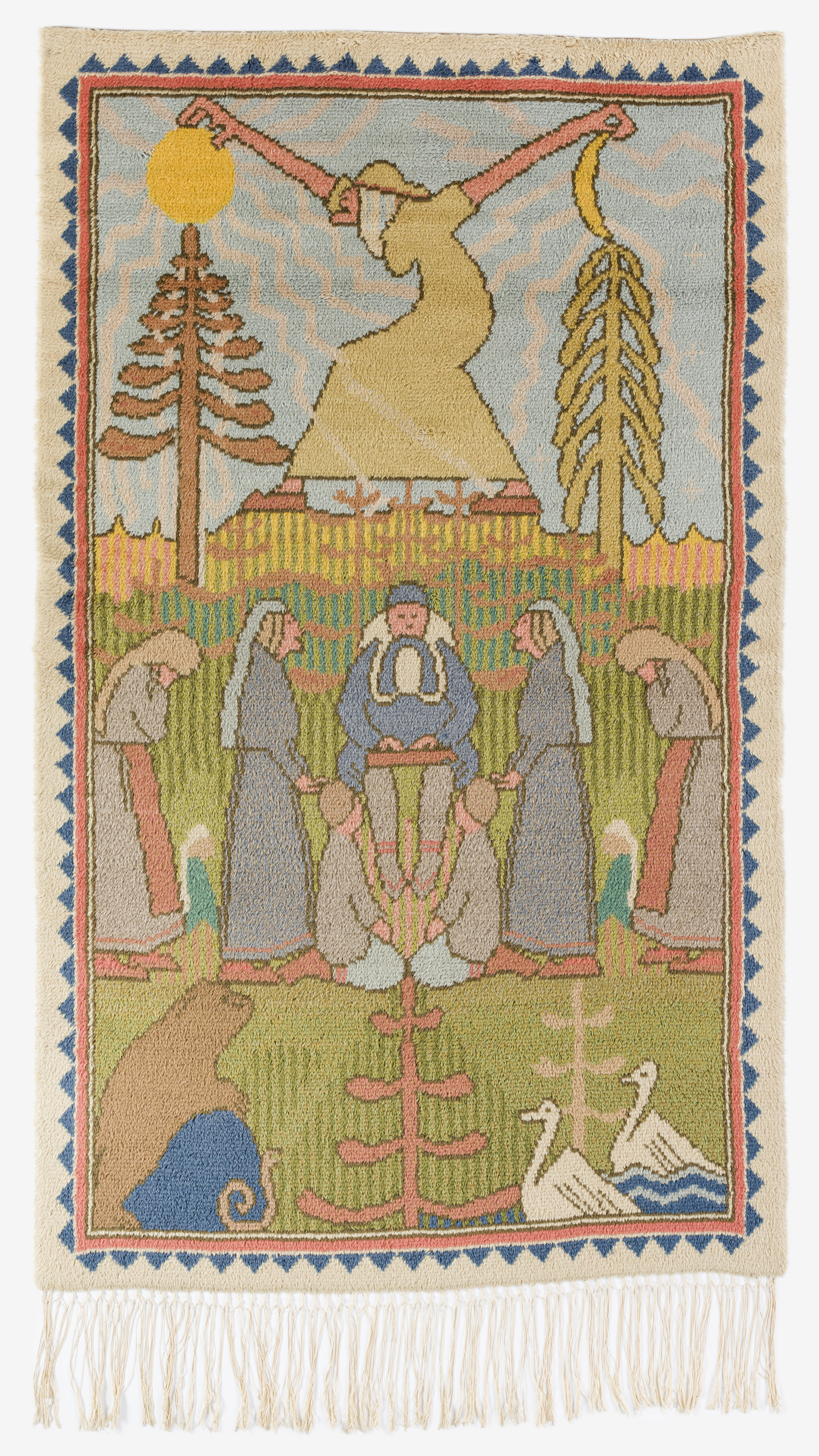
Rya of Louhi stealing the sun and the moon, Joseph Alanen, c. 1909

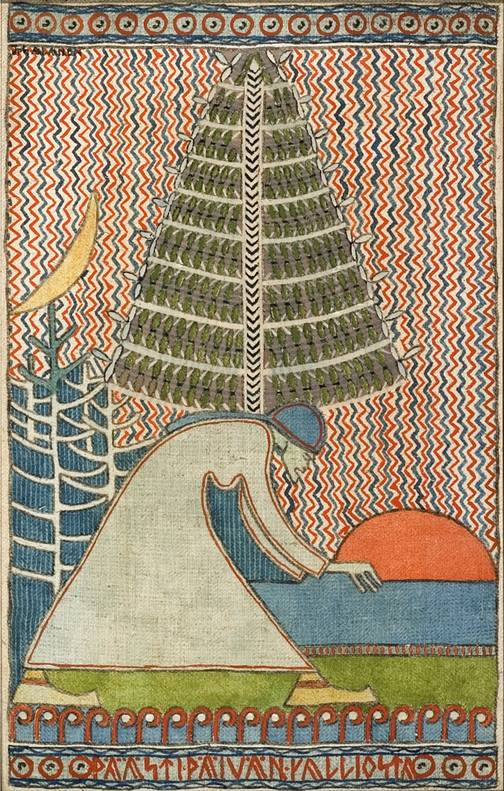
Let the Sun from Bedrock by Joseph Alanen
