= Ajatar =

Mythological creature in Finnish folklore

In Finnish folklore, Ajatar (Finnish pronunciation: [ˈɑjɑtɑr]), also spelled Ajattara [ˈɑjɑˌtːɑrɑ], or Aijotar [ˈɑi̯jotɑr]), is an evil female spirit.

== Description ==
In Finnish folklore Ajatar is an evil female spirit. She is described as having "hair-plait reached to her heels and whose breasts hung down to her knees" similar to the Swedish Skogsrå, Danish 'seawoman', or the wildfraulein of the eifel. Through her connections with Hiisi and Lempo, she is said to spread disease and pestilence. She is closely associated with serpents, and is often depicted in modern art as a dragon or half-humanoid and serpentine figure.

Ajattara has been connected to the word hattara, which could mean a cloud, but was also listed by Christfried Ganander as an evil being or a witch, just like Ajattara, which Ganander wrote meant a nightmare in 1789. Daniel Juslenius called Ajattara an evil witch and a forest troll. According to Christian Erici Lencqvist, Ajattara is a female evil forest haltija, who is scary and fast and drives people astray. Eemil Nestor Setälä demonstrated that Ajattara might appear in Western Finnish runic songs as Aattara in the origin of snakes: the snake is "a twig in Aattara's fence". In runic songs from Muonio and Enontekiö, the name Ajaster(i) appears as another name for Syöjätär and one who injures people by shooting.

== Etymology ==
The word “ajatar” is possibly derived from the Finnish word ajattaa, “to pursue" (also, "to drive"). The feminine suffix “-tar-” appears in several Finnish names, including a variation of Louhi (Louhetar, Loviatar, Louhiatar) and Syöjätär (syödä ‘to eat,’ with the feminine suffix of -tar, means ‘devourer, vampire’). Applying this to Ajatar, the verb ajaa is suffixed by the feminine "-tar," translating as “female pursuer.” The name may have its root in aika 'time' as well, from where ajatar would be an equally regular derivative. Or both. Aika and ajaa might be etymologically connected through the sense of time, like death, hunting oneself.

The form "Ajatar" was invented by Matthias Castrén to standarize the name. Setälä demonstrated that Ajattara might appear in Western Finnish runic songs as Aattara in the origin of snakes. Kaarle Krohn stated that this would need to be Ajattara for correct poetic length, but one shouldn't think Ajatar is the form of the name in said runic song. J. Mikkola connected the name to the Lithuanian word aitvaras 'nightmare, kratt, will o' wisp'. Krohn connected the name to the word aatta 'bad woman', which could be connected to hattara as well. The aja- beginning came from people associating Ajattara with a pursuing nightmare. Lars Levi Laestadius used the word kujahattara 'alley hattara' to refer to a promiscuous woman, and hattara of a haltija who moves and laughs in the dark.

== In other media ==
=== Derivative works ===
Although Ajatar does not appear by name in documented Finnish folk songs, she appears in fiction inspired by the Kalevala and in modern fantasy interpretations.

- In the second act of Aleksis Kivi's play, Kullervo (1860), Ajatar is described as ferocious and shameless, encouraging the protagonist to kill his master’s family. Ajatar states that she lives in the mountains, has Lempo and Gnomes in her service, and that her mother’s father is Hiisi. Ajatar is further described as “nasty” and compared to a “vicious wife who rejoices in evils.”
- In The Eye of Disparager: Book One of the Legend of the Bloodstone written by Brett Stuart Smith, Ajatar is a beautiful woman with the upper body of a green scaled woman and the lower half made up of many snakes. She has serpentine fangs and seductive eyes, and is the mother of all snakes.
- Ajatar is mentioned twice in Matt Smith’s Big Game: Movie Tie-in Edition. Smith referred to her as “the Devil of the Woods who appeared as a dragon and made you sick if you so much as looked at her” and later associations a force of nature to her destructive powers.
- Fantasy author, Philip Mazza, portrays the Ajatar as a race of fire breathing dragons, causing pestilence and disease. In his book, The Harrow: From Under a Tree, Mazza describes two races of Ajatar, black and red, which fight amongst each other. One race, the black dragons, are evil whereas the red race are described as more benevolent.
- In the novel Beneath The Mantle by Ahimsa Kerp, Ajatar is a secondary antagonist serving Ra, the Sun God.
- The second book, Midnight Oil, of the Compleat and True History of the Witches of Galdorheim series by Marva Dasef describes a confrontation between the evil forest elemental, Ajatar, and her air spirit sister, Ilmatar. Ajatar takes dragon form and Ilmatar that of a white roc in a battle in the skies to settle the dispute between the sisters--over a man, of course.
- In episode 10 of the anime The Most Notorious "Talker" Runs the World's Greatest Clan, Leon's group kills a green ajatar in the form of a forest dragon. This beast had 4 chameleon eyes, powerful arms and strange holes in its chest.

=== Christian references ===
In some Finnish translations of The Bible the term ajatar is used to refer to certain demons or devils :

- In Leviticus [17.7] of the Finnish Bible (1776 ed., see also Bible translations into Finnish), a variation of Ajatar’s name (Ajattaroille = to the Ajattaras/Ajatars) appears to use her as a general devil or demon and not a separate entity.

Ja ei millään muotoa enää uhriansa uhraaman ajattaroille, joiden kanssa he huorin tehneet ovat. Se pitää oleman heille heidän sukukunnissansa ijankaikkinen sääty

=== Music ===
- Ajatar by Winter Gardens (2011).
- Ajatar Rising by Epic North Music (2013).
- Ajattara, a Finnish Black Metal named after Ajatar.

== See also ==
- Äijo, Louhi, and Loviatar, and Syöjätär—Finnish folklore figures with some similar characteristics.
