= Kuvaputki =

Kuvaputki / Cathode Ray Tube / Set
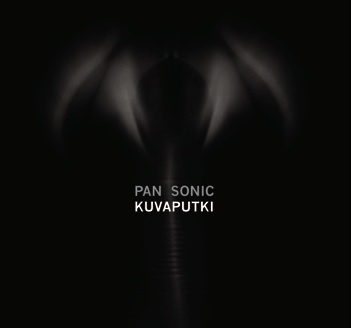
- Cover of the DVD
- Directed by: Edward Quist
- Produced by: Derek Gruen
- Cinematography: Edward Quist
- Edited by: Michael Wargula
- Music by: Pan Sonic
- Distributed by: Blast First Petite
- Release date: March 31, 2008
- Running time: 38 minutes X 3 angles = 114 minutes
- Country: United States

Kuvaputki is a multi-angle DVD by Embryoroom produced and directed by Edward Quist and co-produced by Derek Gruen aka Del Marquis, with music by Pan Sonic, the Finnish experimental electronic music duo consisting of Mika Vainio and Ilpo Väisänen.

The film is "a hyper-real multi-angle DVD environment. Pan sonic, Mika Vainio and Ilpo Väisänen, are immersed in the imagery of the cathode which seems to live and infect their physicality over the course of three parallel films as they merge with their own extreme sound and into Quist's sinister vision."

"A number of motion graphics were developed that would sync with the live documented sound and performance," "From there, the idea evolved much further to include a kind of purely audio-visual narrative that included characters and suggests [the] inner life [that] goes on in a TV, as living energy. The various stages of the cathode process visually unfold."

Locations for the documentary source footage include Philadelphia, PA, Boston, MA, New York City, Helsinki, Turku, and Tampere, Finland. Shooting commenced in 1999 and ended in 2003. With a long period of editing and motion graphic development in Quist's native Brooklyn, NY and Beaver County, Pennsylvania.

The Kuvaputki DVD can fetch as much as £58 (over US$100) in the UK, and £55 used even though it was originally priced under £15. Currently, prices have hit more nominal standards.

There also exists a limited edition bundle of the DVD, hand numbered print, and a correspondingly numbered exclusive download offered directly from Embryoroom. Only 33 exist.

== Festivals ==
In 2000, the first version of the film debuted at the Sonar Festival in Barcelona, Spain. Critics likened the black and white 50 minute film to early rock'n roll documentaries. This now unavailable version was subsequently screened at Buenos Aires International Film Festival, and The Avanto Festival Finlandia

The 2008 DVD version was screened at the Milan Film Festival The only quote from the director was, "Fear Television"

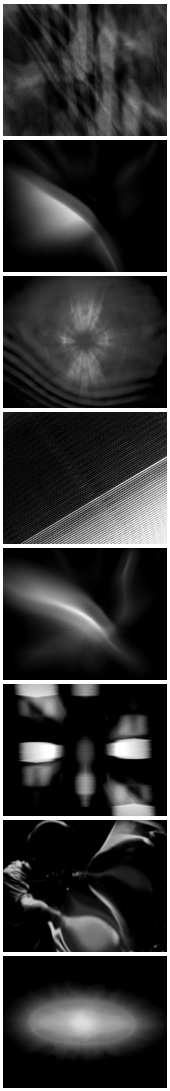
Stills from the film

== Critical response ==
"Kuvaputki, by Edward Quist, belongs to a different genre again, so essential and hypnotic that it seems to go back to the origins of filmmaking: the bare, pure graphic representation of the steady beat of music."-The Milan Film Festival

"Edward Quist has managed to create a real jewel of "counter-animation." The visual experimentation is extreme and magnificent, and hopefully this effort will become a point of reference over the next few months for other, similar publications."-Dagheisha

"This process is really impressive as anyone who watches the DVD will realize. The black and white film unites exceptionally with the sound world of the Finns capturing the spectator. While Kuvaputki is a high quality effort, it would not be an exaggeration for it to be characterized as a real work of art."-Edjs

"The initial idea of producing a documentary on Pan Sonic's live shows culminated in this abstract audiovisual tour de force."-Sonar Festival

"More than a meanly illustrated live show, here is one true multimedia proposition, like a digital update of "In the Shadow of the Sun" by Derek Jarman and with Throbbing Gristle."-Dside

Sonar Electronic Festival described the film as “A beautiful and unique film capturing the very essence of a Pansonic live performance…. which really is quite an achievement”

SxSW Music Festival calls it “An embodiment. Probably the most perfect electronic music film yet”

== Format ==
Format. Each angle has its own title. The running time for each angle is 38 minutes. with a combining running time of 114 minutes.

| 1 Kuvaputki | 2 Cathode Ray Tube | 3 SET |
|---|---|---|
| 1 Alku | Thermionic Emission | Vidsync |
| 2 Maa | Electron Gun | Vidsync2 |
| 3 Toisto | Control Grid | Spore |
| 4 Johto 4 | Cruciform | Transverse |
| 5 Valikohta | Anode | Electric Field |
| 6 Askel | Ion Trap | Plasma Horda |
| 7 Kahalaus | The Glass Envelope | Swamp Grinder |
| 8 Kone | Hathor | Electronoid |
| 9 Esikierto | Phosphor Curtain | Neodimium |
| 10 Murskaus | Irradiance | Centercore |
| 11 C.S.G. Sonic | Bleeder Resistor | Embryon |
| 12 Telakoe | Shadow Mask | Raetheor |
| 13 Loppu | Implosion | Control |

== Concept ==
Angle one, Kuvaputki features 13 chapters each with a Finnish title, it is the closest representation of a documentary based concept. Angle two titled Cathode Ray Tube is a visual representation of the various functions within the cathode ray process, each of the 13 chapters are named after technical processes. Angle three entitled SET is the most abstract and minimal. Its thirteen chapters are titled after either mythological figures or the final phases of the cathode ray process.

== Cast ==
| Mika Vainio | Himself |
| Ilpo Väisänen | Himself |
| Nissim Uriel | Raetheor / The Sickman |
| Michael Wargula | J.J. |
| Kristen Calabrese | Swamp Grinder |
| Albert Tsimal | Electronoid |
