= Syöjätär =

Character in Finnish folklore

Syöjätär (pronounced [ˈsyø̯jætær]; lit. 'eateress'), sometimes referred to as an "ogress", is a character in Finnish folklore. She is associated with the origin of some diseases, as well as unpleasant (or useless) creatures such as the snake, lizard, or wolf. In some folktales she takes the role of wicked mother.

== Description ==
In many Finno-Ugric origin myths, there exists a dualism between a good creator and a bad creator. The good creator creates everything good, but the bad creator ruins this by creating something bad, making the world imperfect. Syöjätär could be seen as a memory of those myths and has been compared to Sámi Áhčešeatni, whose corpse turns into frogs, toads, and other unpleasant animals. In fairytales involving Syöjätär, she is often killed at the end, and snakes and other unpleasant animals come from her corpse. Syöjätär might also ruin God's perfect creation in other ways: Cows used to have their stomachs full of teats, but as Syöjätär complained about having to milk so much, God reduced the number of them, also resulting in less available milk.

In 1789, Christfried Ganander described Syöjätär in Mythologia Fennica as a female demon, half-demon or half troll, a cruel flesh-eater and a cannibal ("eater of men"). The lizard is called the brooch of Syöjätär, and the snake was born out of Syöjätär's spit. Stones are called the "heart's core of Syöjätär", likely added to Syöjätär's list of sins due to the harm and trouble they caused to farmers on fields.

In runic songs, in addition to the above mentioned contexts, Syöjätär might also appear as a name for the snake itself. In a Kainuu song, throat pain is described to have come from a drop of water which had fallen into a spring when Syöjätär had washed her clothes. Syöjätär is described to have given birth to wasps, horse colic, and rickets, while various trees might be described as having made by demonic figures, such as Syöjätär or Lempo. One song also describes the origin of Syöjätär herself: she came to be when Louhi gave birth to the Nine diseases and a tenth child, a daughter.

In the song Kuninkaan prinsessa ja Syöjätär 'King's Princess and Syöjätär', Syöjätär casts a spell, turning a princess into a blind and mute syöjätär, and herself to look like the princess. Not even the prince, the princess's brother, suspects anything. During daytime, Syöjätär made the princess go herd animals in the forest, giving her her original form back for the time. Syöjätär gave the princess a bread she has baked a stone into. When the princess is singing about this in the forest, beautifully and sorrowfully, the prince hears her and joins in the song. The princess got her own form back and the siblings warm up a sauna where they lure Syöjätär into. Syöjätär falls into a deep trap pit and the sauna is set on fire, burning her into the pit.

== In literature ==
=== In the Magic Songs of the Finns ===
Syöjätär appears in some of the "Magic Songs" (spells) catalogued by Lönnrot 1880 in the Suomen kansan muinaisia loitsurunoja - these were later translated into English by Abercromby.

A possible origin story to her is given in a song describing the "Origin of Injuries caused by Spells", which contains some post-Christian elements: Louhiatar wife of Pohja becomes pregnant whilst sleeping with her back to the wind, impregnated by a blast of wind... After more than nine months the woman seeks to give birth but can find no good place to do so - then god (Ukko) speaks to her from a cloud indicating that a "three cornered shed is on the swamp, on the shore facing the sea in gloomy Pohjola [...] go thither to be confined, to lighten thy womb..." - she gives birth to nine sons, and one girl. God (the Christian "Maker") refuses to baptise them, as does "Juhannes, the holy knight" (John the Baptist) - Louhitar then baptises them herself, giving them names (they become disease principles) - one of her boys, who lacks a mouth or eyes remains unnamed, and she sends him away to the Rutja rapids, from him were said to originate sharp frosts, sorcerers and wizards, jealous persons, and the creatures called Syöjätärs.

As with other mythic entities in the "songs" Syöjätär's name is used in allusions or figurative reference to creatures, objects, and concepts - she is generally imbued with negative connotations: In a spell against syphilis the disease is called the progeny of Syöjätär; in a spell against "tooth worm" (Hammasmato, gnawer of teeth and bones, was believed to be the cause of tooth decay and infections) the creature's origin is given as coming indirectly from the work of Syöjätär:

The evil mistress Syöjätär, the old mother of iron, Rakehetar, was pulverising iron grains, was hammering steel points on an iron rock in a mortar of alderwood, with a pestle of alderwood, in a room of alderwood. What she pounded, that she sifted, she gobbled up those groats of hers, bits went astray among her teeth, they settled themselves in the gums to hack the teeth, to rack the jaws.

— Abercromby 1898a, §185, pp.304

Together with Hiisi she is a key element in the creation myth of Snakes - in the story Hiisi's sleep drool is swallowed by Syöjätär, but it burns her and she spits it out.. after being blown by the wind, it lands and dries, Hiisi then brings it to life. In other variants it is Syöjätär's spit, but Hiisi still brings it to life. She is also involved in the creation of the Lizard - she spits on the sea that forms a bubble - the bubble is swallowed by the girl Kasaritar (or Kasarikki) who becomes pregnant for three years, then gives birth to a Lizard. A similar creation story for the Wolf again involves Syöjätär spitting on the sea - then Kuolatar appears from the sea on a bare island - this creature rubs its palms to create some land whereon the wolf was reared.

In a song describing the origin of stone, it is described as the heart's core of Syöjätär, amongst several other allusions; she is also the originator of the Fir tree (in one version), together with Maajatar, Pellervoinen, and Naservainen who develop it.

In a song for the purpose "To Still Violence" Syöjätär is referenced as the "Ogress", and is given as an element in the consumption of persons consumed by violence or anger:

[..] there is the Ogress (Syöjätär) in the sea with a mouth in the middle of her head, a tongue in the middle of her throat, who has eaten a hundred men, destroyed a thousand full-grown men; may she now also eat thee up, as the bread she eats, as the feast she holds.

— Abercromby 1898a, §15, pp.90-91

=== In the Kalevala ===
Syöjätär is mentioned in passing in the Finnish epic, the Kalevala, but does not appear herself - in Rune XV a reference to the creation of the snake from her spit is found; and in Rune XXVI a similar (and longer) description of the formation of a snake from her spit is given.

=== In other folk tales ===
Syöjätär appears in several folk tales, recorded in the Suomen kansan Satuja ja Tarinoita (4 parts) edited by Eero Salmelainen (fi:Eero Salmelainen).

In Saaressa eläjät, a tale about three sisters who seek to marry the King, she appears as a wicked mother who replaces newborn children with animals so that her own daughter can marry the king.

From a German translation in (Erman 1854):

... The youngest sister says she will bear three times three sons, and is chosen - she becomes pregnant and when the time comes for her to give birth she sends her husband to fetch a midwife. On the way he is met by a woman (unbeknown to him it is Syöjätär) - when left along with the woman and her three children she swaps them for three dogs... the same happens the next time the woman becomes pregnant, this time Syöjätär swaps the three children for pigs... a third time she becomes pregnant, and again the Syöjätär comes - this time she recognizes her and hides one child in her breast, the other two are swapped for lap dogs. The husband's (king's) patience expires and he puts them in an iron case with one of the lap dogs and throws it in the sea - eventually the cask washes ashore. Deserted on an island surrounded by salt water the boy prays to god, and god provides a fabulous house, food from a magic tree, and a bridge to the mainland. Eventually tales of the place reach the prince, and he plans to set out to see it.

However he has since married a daughter of Syojatar, who tries to prevent him going, telling of marvels she has - first three pigs, then six stallions - each time the boy drives the creatures off. Finally the prince's new wife says she has eight golden boys sleeping on a smooth lawn by a large stone covered with red cloth. The boy says he would like to fetch those too - his mother tells him first she must make him food - she makes eight cakes from flour and her breast milk, and tells her son to give one to each boy. He does this and the boys wake up - they are his eight brothers - he returns with them. The king visits the stone but finds nothing and returns to his new wife disappointed, telling her he now intends to visit the island. There he is warmly welcomed by his nine sons and former wife - they are reunited and tell him their story.

The king returns to his castle and orders hot stones put in pit in the bath house, and covered with a cloth - then his new wife, daughter of Syöjätär is taken to bathe - she hops into the bath-house and falls into the pit, and is burnt. The king as his former wife and sons are reunited and return to live in the king's castle.

Syöjätär also appears in other stories in the same collection of tales. In Part 1: Mikko Mieheläinen; Ihmeellinen koiwu; Kummallinen tammi; Merestä-nousija neito; Weljiänsä etsijät ja joutsenina lentäjät; Neitonen kuninkaan sadussa; and Weljiänsä-etsijä tyttö, and in Part 2: Leppäpölkky; and Awannolla kehrääjät.

== Similar folklorish figures ==
Together with ajatar (huntress) and akka (old woman), Syöjätär fills similar roles in Finnish folklore as does Baba Yaga in Russian lore. There are also some similarities between Syöjätär and Russian folklore depiction of the devil – such as both being the origin of creatures like snakes and toads. Syöjätär lacks the positive side of the ambiguous Baba Yaga – this role is fulfilled by akka in Finnish myth.
