= Elektro Music Department =

Elektro Music Department (EMD) is a minimal techno label, founded in Berlin 1995, and counts as "one of the most style building labels in techno history". The artwork is made by Berlin-based Swiss minimal artist Daniel Pflumm.

== Background ==
In the beginning of the label's history the label was engaged in a combination of art and club happening. The Berlin-based micro club Elektro, which since 1992 organized events with international DJs and techno acts at Mauerstraße 15 in Berlin, until the building was demolished 1995, was affiliated. In the end of the 1990s, first the Panasonic, from which founding context the Finnish techno project Pan Sonic derived its name, succeeded the Elektro, then the Init, both in Berlin, Mitte.

== Musicians ==
- Klaus Kotai, Gabriele Loschelder (as Kotai + Mo), Daniel Pflumm, El Puma, 100 Records, Riley Reinhold (RRR), Jochen Bader, and Mika Vainio.

== Literature ==
- Ulrich Gutmair – Die ersten Tage von Berlin: Der Sound der Wende (2013, IV. Das Elektro, Mauerstraße 15. Full Costumer Satisfaction)
