= Luxxury =

American DJ and record producer

- Born: Blake Robin
- Origin: US
- Genres: Disco, funk, synth-pop
- Occupations: DJ, musician, producer, songwriter, podcaster, TikTok creator
- Instruments: Vocals, guitar, bass, synthesizer, turntables
- Years active: 2003–present
- Labels: Kitsuné, Manimal Vinyl, Boogie Angst, Future Disco, Deep&Disco, Super Weird Substance, Atlantic Records, Reinhardt Records, Razor & Tie, RCRD LBL, IAMSOUND, Nolita, Paperclip
- Website: luxxury.com

Luxxury (birth name Blake Robin), formerly known as Baron von Luxxury, is an American producer, songwriter, DJ and artist.

== Career ==
His best known songs include "Be Good 2 Me" (as heard in the Xbox game Forza Horizon 4), "Feels So Good" (as heard exclusively in the Xbox game Forza Horizon 5), "Breathe (Again)" and "Feel The Night"; earlier songs include "Drunk", which was used in commercials for Pontiac; "Sweet and Vicious", which was used on The Hills; and "I Know There's Something Going On", a cover of a song by Anni-Frid Lyngstad from ABBA.

In addition to being the sole songwriter and producer for that band, he is a touring DJ as well as being an in-demand producer, remixer and songwriter formerly under contract with Razor and Tie Music Publishing for whom he has cowritten songs for artists including Vanessa Daou and Little Boots, as well as the song "If That's Love" (co-written with Jesse Owen Astin and Bonnie McKee), which was featured on the CSI: Miami episode, "Show Stopper". He was also a co-founder of the now defunct MP3 blog Disco Workout. Luxxury's 2012 full-length album "The Last Seduction" was released on Manimal Vinyl and featured songs about his friends Theresa Duncan and Jeremy Blake. The album received strong reviews and made it to several "best of 2012" lists, including that of Duran Duran's John Taylor.

In 2013 he began releasing a series of unofficial remixes called "LUXXURY Edits" using "(mostly) only original multitrack stems" for a number of famous songs including Eagles' "Hotel California", Duran Duran's "Girls on Film", and various others. As a result of the attention received he began to get commissioned remix work from artists including Greg Wilson, Melanie Martinez, Fitz and the Tantrums, and others.

A series of original singles moving away from "the synths and Moroder-y stuff from my earlier records" to "1979-style Rhodes piano, funky bass, vintage sounding beats and dreamy floaty vocals: Bee Gees meets Todd Terje" was announced in late 2015; the first single "Take it Slow" premiered on January 19, 2016, followed by a number of singles in a similarly vintage funk/disco vein. As a DJ, Robin performs a mix of live, on-the-fly remixes and sings his original material, often accompanied by one or more other musicians. Sometimes this includes a full live band, with whom he has performed opening for Giorgio Moroder, Escort and The Juan Maclean, including a performance on Last Call with Carson Daly.

In July 2020 Robin began posting short videos deconstructing the musical origins of popular songs, and quickly amassed over 300,000 followers on TikTok and 100,000 on Instagram. In 2023 he signed to Kevin Hart's Hartbeat Network to create and co-host the podcast One Song along with writer, producer and actor Diallo Riddle. He also signed with Oxford University Press to write a yet-to-be-titled book about musical borrowing, which will be published in 2025.

== Luxxury discography ==
- The Drunk EP (2004) Nolita Records
- The Dirty Girls (Need Love Too) EP (2004) Nolita Records
- Rock and Roll (is Evil) (2006) Razor & Tie/Nolita Records
- Sweet and Vicious: The Remixes (2007) Nolita Records
- The Last Seduction (2012) Manimal Vinyl
- Luxxury Edits Vol. 1 (2014) Exxpensive Sounding Music
- Hold On/Take it Slow (EP) (2016) Deep&Disco
- What Do Ya Really Want (single) (2016) Plant Music
- Breathe (single) (2016) Eskimo Recordings
- How to be Good (EP) (2016) Nolita Records
- Feel The Night (single) (2017) Nolita Records
- I Need You (single) (2017) Nolita Records
- Pleasure! (single) (2017) Nolita Records
- Be Good 2 Me (EP) (2018) Nolita Records
- Keep it Together with Kraak & Smaak (2018) Future Disco
- i wanna be EVERYTHING (2018) Nolita Records
- Another Lifetime with Scavenger Hunt (2019) Nolita Records/AWAL
- Change Yr Mind (ft. Adeline) (2019) Kitsuné
- It's Not Funny LP (2019) Nolita Records
- Set Me Free (2020) Nolita Records
- Don't Give Up (I Believe in You) (2021) Nolita Records
- Let's Stay Together (2021) Nolita Records
- Just Like It Was Before (feat. Jill Lamoureux) (2021) Boogie Angst Records
- Alright LP (2022) Nolita Records
- Perfect Forever (2023) Nolita Records

=== Remixes & Re-edits ===
- Hilary Duff – Stranger (Baron von Luxxury Remix) (2007)
- Luxxury – Drunk (Lovesick Vocoders at Night Remix) (2007)
- Scissors for Lefty – Ghetto Ways (Baron von Luxxury Remix) (2007)
- CSS – A La La (Baron von Luxxury Remix) (2007)
- Dirty Sanchez – Really Rich Italian Satanists (Baron von Luxxury Remix) (2008)
- Marianne Faithfull – Broken English (Baron von Luxxury Remix) (2008)
- Robots in Disguise – We're in the Music Biz (Baron von Luxxury Remix) (2008)
- Robots in Disguise – The Sex Has Made Me Stupid (Baron von Luxxury Remix) (2008)
- Sunny Day Sets Fire – Brainless (Baron von Luxxury Remix) (2008)
- Glass Candy – I Always Say Yes (Baron von Luxxury Remix) (2008)
- Little Boots – Meddle (Baron von Luxxury Remix) (2008)
- The Secret Handshake – All for You (Baron von Luxxury Remix) (2009)
- Del Marquis – Runaround (Baron von Luxxury Remix) (2009)
- The Burning Hotels – Stuck in the Middle (Baron von Luxxury Controls Everything Remix) (2009)
- Health – Eat Flesh (Baron von Luxxury Remix) (2010)
- Cocteau Twins – Lazy Calm (Luxxury Re-edit) (2010)
- The Child – Boomerang (Baron von Luxxury Totally Goth Remix) (2011)
- Austra – Spellwork (Baron von Luxxury Remix) (2011)
- Cameras – June (Baron von Luxxury Remix) (2012)
- Trust – Dressed for Space (Baron von Luxxury Remix) (2012)
- Fleetwood Mac – Rhiannon (Luxxury Re-edit) (2012)
- Louise Burns – Paper Cup (Baron von Luxxury Remix) (2013)
- Daisy O'Dell – Never (Baron von Luxxury Remix) (2013)
- Madonna – "Vogue" (LUXXURY edit) (2013)
- Foreigner – Urgent (LUXXURY edit) (2013)
- Simon and Garfunkel – "The Sound of Silence" (LUXXURY edit) (2013)
- Bee Gees – Night Fever (LUXXURY edit) (2013)
- David Bowie – Golden Years (LUXXURY edit) (2013)
- Fleetwood Mac – Rhiannon (LUXXURY edit) (2013)
- The Clash – "Rock the Casbah" (LUXXURY edit) (2013)
- Eagles – Hotel California (LUXXURY edit) (2014)
- Blondie – Rapture (LUXXURY edit) (2014)
- Duran Duran – Girls on Film (LUXXURY edit) (2014)
- Kiss – "I Was Made for Loving You" (LUXXURY edit) (2015)
- Talking Heads – "Once in a Lifetime" (LUXXURY edit) (2015)
- Slow Knights – Candy Sugar Rush (LUXXURY remix) (2015)
- The Controversy – Two Voices (LUXXURY remix) (2015)
- Donna Summer – "Bad Girls" (LUXXURY edit) (2015)
- The Doors – "Riders on the Storm" (LUXXURY edit) (2015)
- Greg Wilson – Summer Came My Way (LUXXURY remix) (2015)
- Melanie Martinez – "Soap" (LUXXURY remix) (2015)
- Led Zeppelin – "Whole Lotta Love" (LUXXURY edit) (2015)
- Petula Clark – "I'm Not in Love" (LUXXURY edit) (2015)
- Blue Öyster Cult – "(Don't Fear) The Reaper" (LUXXURY edit) (2016)
- Antenna Happy – Body (LUXXURY edit) (2016)
- Fitz and the Tantrums – "HandClap" (LUXXURY remix) (2016)
- Valida – Stars (LUXXURY remix) (2016)
- Michael Jackson – "Rock with You" (LUXXURY edit) (2016)
- New Order – "Blue Monday" (LUXXURY edit) (2016)
- Terrace – Tribeca (LUXXURY remix) (2017)
- The Ramona Flowers – If You Remember (LUXXURY remix) (2017)
- Hall & Oates – "Maneater" (LUXXURY edit) (2017)
- The Ramona Flowers – Strangers (LUXXURY remix) (2018)
- Gavin Turek – Whitney (LUXXURY remix) (2019)
- Goldroom – Guess I'm Jaded (LUXXURY remix) (2020)
- Matti Charlton – A Rocket Ship to the Moon (LUXXURY vocal edit remix) (2021)
