= Del Marquis =

American guitarist (born 1977)

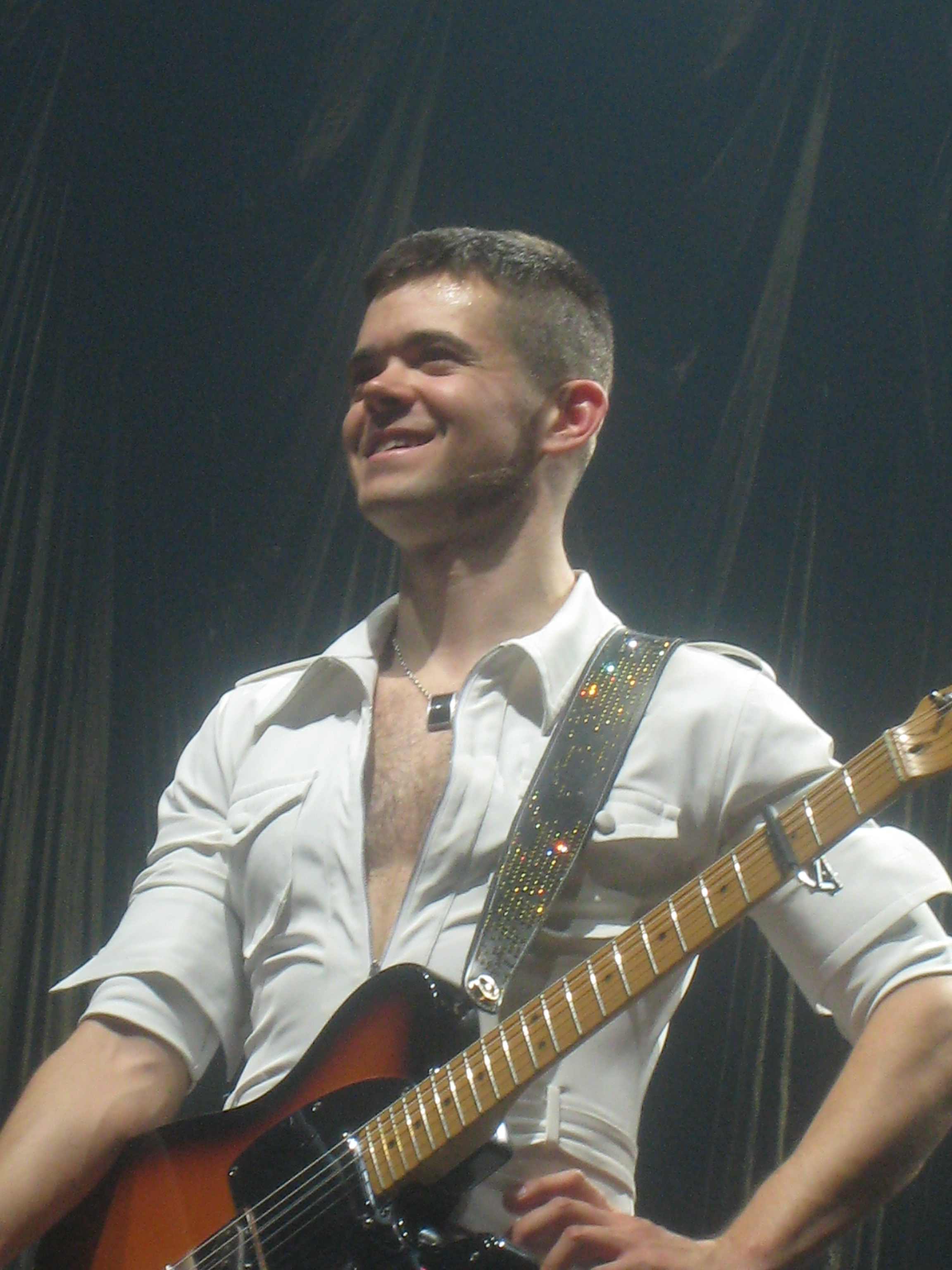
- Del Marquis in 2007

Background information
- Birth name: Derek Gruen
- Born: August 31, 1977 (age 48); New York City, U.S.
- Genres: Disco; alternative; pop; R&B
- Occupations: Musician; songwriter; producer
- Instrument: Guitar
- Years active: 2002–present

Derek Gruen (born on August 31, 1977), known by the stage name Del Marquis, is an American musician and the lead guitarist for the pop/rock group Scissor Sisters. He is also the creator and producer of the band Slow Knights.

== Career ==
=== Scissor Sisters ===
Born in New York City, he was introduced to the Scissor Sisters in 2001 at the insistence of a friend who, at the time, was dating Jake Shears. He originally dismissed the band when he first saw them perform at The Cock, a New York City gay bar.

=== Solo ===
Gruen produced the DVD Kuvaputki released in 2008 by Embryoroom director Edward Quist about Finnish noise artists Pan Sonic.

On Halloween 2008, he began releasing solo material, starting with the song "Hot House", only available with a digital film from his official site. The video was made by Embryoroom, the same director who made Kuvaputki. Further to this, on November 6 it was announced that Del was to digitally release a series of solo EPs, with one released the first Tuesday of every month from December 2008 to April 2009. These contained collaborations with Joan As Police Woman and Basement Jaxx. The first EP, titled Hothouse, was released on December 2. The Runaround EP was released in September 2009, and includes remixes from Baron von Luxxury and Lifelike. The other EPs were titled Character Assassination, and Litter to Society, each with an accompanying videos by Embryoroom.

Gruen & Boys Choir of Harlem alumnus Xavier - credited as Del x Xavier, who would later join Slow Knights, collaborated on an EP titled Tickle. It was released online as a free download in February 2013.

=== Slow Knights ===
After Scissor Sisters announced their hiatus in 2012, Gruen founded a five-person collective that became Slow Knights. They released two albums, Cosmos on March 26, 2013; and Living in a Dark World on April 20, 2015.

== Personal life ==
Gruen is of German, Irish, Polish and Austrian descent, though his great grandfather was born in Riga. He is formally trained as a furniture designer.

He is gay and was included on a list of openly gay entertainers in The Advocate's "Forty Under 40" issue of June/July 2009.
