= Kesto (234.48:4) =

Album by Pan Sonic

Studio album by Pan Sonic
- Released: May 18, 2004
- Recorded: Berlin, 2003
- Genre: Experimental, noise, glitch, drone, IDM, minimal techno
- Length: 234:48 (all four discs)
- Label: Blast First, Mute
- Producer: Mika Vainio and Ilpo Väisänen

Pan Sonic chronology
Aaltopiiri (2001)	Kesto (234.48:4) (2004)	Katodivaihe (2007)

Professional ratings
Aggregate scores
Source	Rating
Metacritic	74
Review scores
Source	Rating
AllMusic	4.5/5 stars
Pitchfork	(8.2/10)
PopMatters	(mixed)
Q	(favorable)
SputnikMusic	5/5 stars
Stylus Magazine	(A)
The Wire	(favorable)

Kesto (234.48:4), released jointly by Blast First and Mute Records, is the fifth album released by Pan Sonic. The Finnish title roughly translates to "strength" or "duration", referencing both the quadruple-disc album and the general abrasiveness of their music. The subtitle "(234.48:4)" is the length of the entire album.

== Background and structure ==
After the 2001 release of Aaltopiiri, Pan Sonic embarked on an unusual world tour based on two adverts in The Wire magazine. Responders - either promoters or fans or anyone who is curious - had to convince them that their location was exotic and interesting to perform in and the only stipulation was that they had to provide accommodation and a percentage of the profits (if they were made for that night). So the group toured in many different locations all around the world for eight weeks. It would have continued for another four but Mika Vainio fell ill and cancelled the other dates in order to recover. (In the future, the group would only tour for only a few weeks at a time rather than as a long excursion).

During Mika's recovery in their new home and studio in Berlin, the two were contemplating their next album. They drew inspiration from Mika's favorite artist Francis Bacon and in particular, his inclination to create thematic triptyches. So they created three albums with three distinct atmospheres. Later on, they would be inspired to do a fourth disc. The album was recorded in Berlin in 2003.

Each of the discs reflects elements of their style of music, with the dynamics and tempi generally decreasing throughout. The first CD consists largely of shorter compositions, reminiscent of the synthesis of pop structures and electronic noise found in industrial precursors like Suicide, while the second consists of less intense, electro influenced songs, using the same processed sine tones with more restraint and rhythmic consistency. The third and fourth CDs are more amorphous, the former incorporating Musique concrète elements and the latter is a single hour-long track that recalls early electronic composer Eduard Artemyev.

Each of the discs are in slipcases with photographs by Anne Hämäläinen gracing the covers. Several songs were dedicated to other musicians: "Rähinä II / Mayhem II" to Bruce Gilbert of the band Wire; "Keskeisvoima / Centralforce" to Keiji Haino; "Vähentajä / Diminisher" to the band Suicide; "Sykkivä / Throbbing" to the band Throbbing Gristle; "Linjat / Lines" to Alvin Lucier; and "Säteily / Radiation" to Charlemagne Palestine.

== Track listing ==
Nearly all of the titles have both the original Finnish and a rough English translation provided by the group itself. The following track listing is what exactly appears on the album.

Disc one
No.	Title	Length
1.	"Rähinä I / Mayhem I"	2:47
2.	"Mutaaattori / Mutator"	7:05
3.	"Onkalo / Cavity"	1:58
4.	"Pakoisvoima / Fugalforce"	3:59
5.	"Louhi"	1:47
6.	"Rähinä II / Mayhem II"	2:59
7.	"Riimu / Halter"	1:59
8.	"Keskeisvoima / Centralforce"	8:49
9.	"Vähentajä / Diminisher"	4:02
10.	"Rähinä III / Mayhem III"	3:56
11.	"Lautturi / Rafter"	5:51
12.	"Painovoima / Gravity"	5:16

Disc two
No.	Title	Length
1.	"Etäisyys / Distance"	5:43
2.	"Konnat / Toads"	3:32
3.	"Virtamuuntaja / Current-Transformer"	3:49
4.	"Tasmania"	3:10
5.	"Johto 5. / Cable 5."	4:26
6.	"Valomuuntaja / Light-Transformer"	3:33
7.	"Routa-Olio / Groundfrost-Being""	2:16
8.	"Sykkivä / Throbbing"	4:41
9.	"Altistus / Exposure"	1:14
10.	"Telemiitit / Telemites"	7:10
11.	"Prospekt Vernadskogo"	2:23
12.	"Arktinen / Arctic"	7:40

Disc three
No.	Title	Length
1.	"Viemärimaailma / Sewageworld"	10:46
2.	"Käytävä / Corridor"	10:28
3.	"Ilmenemismuoto / Appearanceform"	7:36
4.	"Pakkasen Holvit / Arches of Frost"	4:16
5.	"Selittämätön / Inexplicable"	9:07
6.	"Ilma / Air"	9:38
7.	"Koljan Uni / Sleep of Haddock"	3:04
8.	"Linjat / Lines"	18:09

Disc four
No.	Title	Length
1.	"Säteily / Radiation"	61:16
