= Mielikki and Her Nine Sons =

Finnish fairy tale

"Mielikki and Her Nine Sons" is a Finnish fairy tale published in the compilation Tales from a Finnish Tupa. It is related to the theme of the calumniated wife and is classified in the international Aarne–Thompson–Uther Index as ATU 707, "The Three Golden Children", in a version of the story that occurs in Northern Europe and Northwest Russia, namely, in Finland, Estonia, and among Finno-Ugric languages spoken in Russia.

Despite the same classification as a form more commonly found across Europe, the tale and variants collected in the Finno-Ugric languages more closely resemble the East Slavic redaction, akin to The Tale of Tsar Saltan, by Russian poet Alexander Pushkin.

== Summary ==
Three maidens go for a walk in the woods and talk to each other: the first promises to make bread for the whole army with three barley seeds, the second that she can weave clothes for the army with three stalks of flax, and the third, named Mielikki, that she will bear nine sons. A king named Aslo overhears their boasts and chooses Mielikki as his wife. The bards celebrate the occasion with a song that describes the royal children as having hands of gold, feet of silver, a "shining dawn" on their shoulders, a moonbeam on their chests, and "stars of heaven" on their foreheads. The king's servants procure a midwife for the queen and find an old woman named Noita-Akka.

Each time the queen bears three sons that are replaced by three crows by Noita-Akka and hidden near a white stone in the woods. The third time, however, Mielikki protects two sons from the midwife's machinations, but she and her two children are cast in the sea in a barrel. Mother and children, named Martii and Olavi, wash ashore on an island. A sturgeon appears and asks to be cut open, so it can help the siblings. The elder brother refuses, while the younger one does: inside the fish, they find a blue cloth and a white handkerchief: the blue cloth can manifest a palace for them, and, when waved over the shore, a bridge will appear to connect with the mainland. It happens thus, and the family live out their days there, but they pocket the white handkerchief, for a later occasion. One day, a beggar visits Mielikki's island, eats and drinks at the boys' palace, then goes to King Aslo's court to describe the sights he saw there, especially the boys' astral birthmarks and metal-coated legs and arms.

Based on the beggar's description, which reminds him of his wife's promise, King Aslo asks the beggar to be taken there to this island. He goes to Mielikki's island and finds his wife and two of his children there. The King then takes them back to the castle. After the joyous reunion, the two remaining brothers decide to look for their missing siblings. Queen Mielikki, realizing her sons are set on a quest to rescue their brothers, prepares some rieska with her breastmilk to be given to her missing sons. They find an old woman's house, and the old woman tells them their seven brothers become gulls by wearing feather robes, so, in order to lift their curse, the pair must burn the brothers' feather robes.

== Analysis ==
=== Tale type ===
The tale is classified in the international Aarne-Thompson-Uther Index as ATU 707, "The Three Golden Children". It corresponds, in Finland, to the Finnish type AT 707, Kolme kultaista poikaa ("Three Golden Boys"). According to the Finnish Folktale Catalogue, established by scholar Pirkko-Liisa Rausmaa, the third sister promises to bear either nine or three golden sons, the witch Syöjätär replaces the sons for crows, and the mother and the only son(s) she rescued are thrown in the sea in a barrel.

The Finnish tale type more closely resembles the East Slavic variants of the tale type, wherein the wonderful children are born with "legs of gold up the knee, arms of silver up to the elbow", mother and son(s) are cast in a barrel, and build a palace for themselves.

=== Motifs ===
In a late 19th century article, Finnish folklorist Antti Aarne noted that Finnish variants "always" ("всегда", in the original) begin with the three sisters, and the youngest promising to bear children with marvelous qualities: golden hands and silver feet, or with astral birthmarks (moon on the forehead and sun on the crown). The number of promised children may vary between 3, 9, and 12, and, according to Aarne, nine is the number that appears in variants from Eastern Finland. Lastly, in all variants ("всехъ вариантахъ", in the original), the queen and one of her sons are cast in the sea in a barrel and wash ashore on an island.

French comparativist Emmanuel Cosquin, in a 1922 article, noted that in a Finnish tale from Russian Karelia, the remaining two sons, cast in the sea along with their mother, prepare small loaves of bread with their mother's milk and go to rescue their elder brothers, a motif that appears in two similar Belarusian tales. Cosquin then concluded that the use of mother's milk served to confirm the brotherly relationship between the hero and his brothers.

== Variants ==
=== Finland ===
In a late 19th century article, Finnish folklorist Antti Aarne noted that the story was found "all over" Finland, but it was "especially common" in the eastern part of the country, namely, in Arkhangelsk and Olonets. Likewise, according to Finnish scholar Pirkko-Liisa Rausmaa (1972), the Finnish variants amount to 100 texts (in a later publication, 106 texts), being "more common" in the eastern portion of Finland.

==== Regional tales ====
Finnish author Eero Salmelainen collected three Finnish variants he grouped under the banner Naisen yhdeksän poikaa ("The Woman's Nine Children"). In one of his tales, titled Tynnyrissä kaswanut Poika ("The boy who grew in a barrel"), summarized by W. Henry Jones and Lajos Kropf, the king overhears three daughters of a peasant woman boasting about their abilities, the third sister promising to bear three sets of triplets with the moon on their temples, the sun on the top of their heads, hands of gold, and feet of silver. She marries the king, and her envious older sisters substitute the boys for animals. She manages to save her youngest child, but both are cast into the sea in a barrel. They reach an island; her son grows up at a fast rate and asks his mother to prepare nine cakes with her milk, so he can use them to rescue his brothers.

In another tale, titled Saaressa eläjät and translated into German as Die auf der Insel Lebenden ("Living on an island"), the third sister promises to bear three sons in each pregnancy and marries the king. The king sends for a midwife and a mysterious woman offers her services - the witch Syöjätär. The witch replaces the children with animals, but by the third time, the mother hides her latest son. The mother is cast in the sea in a barrel and washes ashore on an island. She and her son pray to God for a house, and He grants their prayer. The king marries another wife, the daughter of Syojatar, who tells him about wondrous things in a faraway place: three pigs, six stallions, and eight golden boys on a large stone. The son decides to find the eight boys and asks his mother to prepare cakes with her breastmilk. He brings his eight brothers back to their mother. The king decides to visit the island, meets his wife and nine sons, and discovers the truth.

August Löwis de Menar translated a Finnish variant from Ingermanland, with the title Bruder und Schwester und die goldlockigen Königssöhne ("Brother and Sister, and the golden-haired sons of the King"): a pair of siblings, a boy and a girl, flee from home and live in the forest. One day, the king finds the girl, naked atop a tree, and asks if she is a baptized woman. They marry and she gives birth to two golden-haired sons in each pregnancy, but they are replaced for animals and given to a devil. The mother gives birth to a seventh son and she is banished in the sea in a barrel. They reach an island and God helps them by creating a grand palace. The seventh son asks his mother to prepare cakes with her breastmilk because he decides to find his six brothers. He reaches the house of the devil and takes his siblings back to his mother. One day, the king visits their island palace and wishes to be told a story. The seventh son tells the king, their father, the story of their family. The king recognizes his sons and reconciles with his wife.

=== Estonia ===
The tale type is known in Estonia as Imelised lapsed ("The Miraculous Children"). Estonian folklorists identified two opening episodes: either the king's son finds the three sisters, or the three sisters are abandoned in the woods and cry so much their tears create a river that flows to the king's palace. (Note: Russian folklorist Lev Barag stated that the motif of the sisters' tears forming a river appears in the folklore of Asian peoples.) The third sister promises to bear the wonder children with astronomical motifs on their bodies. The story segues into the Tale of Tsar Saltan format: the mother and the only child she rescued are thrown into the sea; the son grows up and seeks the wonders the evil aunts tell his father about: "a golden pig, a wonderous cat, miraculous children". According to Estonian folklorist Richard Viidalepp, tale type ATU 707 registers almost 45 Estonian variants, mainly in southern Estonia, around Setu-Vastseliina.

==== Regional tales ====
Folklorist William Forsell Kirby translated an Estonian version first collected by Friedrich Reinhold Kreutzwald, with the name The Prince who rescued his brothers: a king with silver-coated legs and golden-coated arms marries a general's daughter with the same attributes. When she gives birth to her sons, her elder sister sells eleven of her nephews to "Old Boy" (a devil-like character) while the queen is banished with her twelfth son and cast adrift into the sea in a barrel. At the end of the tale, the youngest prince releases his brothers from Old Boy and they transform into doves to reach their mother.

In a tale from the Lutsi Estonians collected by linguist Oskar Kallas with the name Kuningaemand ja ta kakstõistkümmend poega ("The Queen and her Twelve Sons"), a man remarries and, on orders of his new wife, takes his three daughters to the forest on the pretext of picking up berries, and abandons them there. The king's bird flies through the woods and finds the girls. The animal inquires them about their skills: the elder one says she can feed the whole world with an ear of wheat; the middle one that she can clothe the whole world with a single linen thread, and the third that she will bear 12 sons, each with a moon on the head, the sun, and stars on their bodies. The bird carries each one to the king, who takes them in. Years later, the king marries the third girl, and she gives birth to three sons in her first pregnancy. Her elder sister takes the boys and drops them in a swamp, replacing them with kittens. This happens again with the next pregnancies: as soon as they are born, the triplets are replaced for animals (puppies in the second, piglets in the third, and lambs in the fourth). However, in the fourth pregnancy, the queen hides one of her sons with her. The king orders her to cast his wife in the sea in an iron boat with her son. The son begs for an island to receive them, and his mother blesses his prayer. After they wash ashore on the island, the boy wishes the island is filled with golden and silver trees, with apples with half of gold and half of silver. His mother blesses his wish, and it happens. He next wishes for a palace larger than his father's, an army greater than his, and finally for a bridge to connect the island to the continent. Later, he asks his mother to bake 12 cakes with her breastmilk, for he intends to rescue his older brothers. He crosses the bridge and reaches a swamp, then finds a moss-covered hut. He enters the hut and places the 12 cakes on the table. His eleven brothers - everyone shining due to their birthmarks - come to the hut and eat the cakes. Their younger brother appears and convinces them to join their mother on the island. Later, the son wishes for instruments to play, which draws the attention of his father, the king. The king comes to the island and learns of the whole truth.

Kallas published a homonymous variant from the Lutsi Estonians in abbreviated form. In this tale, a king meets three maidens on the road; the third promises to bear him 12 sons with the sun and the moon on the head, a star on their breast, hands of gold and feet of silver. The king and the maiden marry; the children are replaced by animals as soon as they are born, and the mother and her last son are cast into the sea in a sack. The first thing her son does is find his brothers. Later, after he rescues his brothers, he flies back to his father's court to spy on him and the other maidens, and learns of the sights: a cat that lives in oak and provides clothes for its owner; a cow with a lake between its horns; and a boar that sows his own fields and bakes his own bread.

In another tale from the Lutsi, published with the title Kolm õde ("Three Sisters"), a tsar has three daughters and is a great musician. One day, he leaves home and does not return. His daughters go looking for him and find him dead. They begin to cry, their tears creating a river that flows to another kingdom. The son of another tsar orders his servant to discover its origin and finds the girls. The sisters are brought to the prince's presence and are questioned about their skills: the elder promises to feed the entire country with one pea, the middle one that she can feed the country's horses with one grain of oat, and the youngest promises to give birth to 12 sons. The prince marries the third sister. In time, she gives birth to 12 sons. A sequence of falsified letters lies that she gave birth to animal-headed children, and must be punished by being cast in the sea. The prince's wife and a son are thrown into the sea in a barrel and wash ashore on an island. The son grows up and goes hunting around the island. He prepares to shoot at a swan, but the swan pleads to be spared, and helps the boy three times: the first, to pull a thread by the seashore (which guides his father's ship to the island); secondly, to throw 11 pebbles on the sea (which summons his 11 brothers to the island); finally, to fish a goldfish (which leads his father's ship again to the island).

=== Karelia ===
Karelian researchers register that the tale type is "widely reported" in Karelia, with 55 variants collected (31 in North Karelia), apart from tales considered to be fragments or summaries of The Tale of Tsar Saltan. According to their research, at least 50 of them follow the Russian redaction (see above), while 5 of them are closer to the Western European tales.

According to Karelian scholarship, the witch Syöjätär is the recurrent antagonist in Karelian variants of tale type 707, especially in tales from South Karelia.

==== Regional tales ====
In a Karelian tale, "Девять золотых сыновей" ("Nine Golden Sons"), the third sister promises to give birth to "three times three" children, their arms of gold up to the elbow, the legs of silver up to the knees, a moon on the temples, a sun on the front and stars in their hair. The king overhears their conversation and takes the woman as his wife. On their way, they meet a woman named Syöjätär, who insists to be the future queen's midwife. She gives birth to triplets in three consecutive pregnancies, but Syöjätär replaces them for rats, crows and puppies. The queen saves one of her children and is cast into a sea in a barrel. The remaining son asks his mother to bake bread with her breastmilk to rescue his brothers.

Author Eero Salmelainen collected a tale titled Veljiensä etsijät ja joutsenina lentäjät ("One who seeks brothers flying as swans"), which poet Emmy Schreck translated as Die neun Söhne des Weibes ("The woman's nine children") and indicated a Russian-Karelian source for this tale. In this variant, three sisters walk in the forest and talk to each other, the youngest promising to bear nine children in three pregnancies. The king's son overhears them and decides to marry the youngest, and she bears the wonder children with hands of gold, legs of silver, sunlight in their hair, moonlight shining around it, the "celestial chariot" (Himmelswagen, or Ursa Major) on their shoulder, and stars in their underarms. The king dispatches a servant to look for a washerwoman and a witch offers her services. The witch replaces the boys for animals, takes them to the woods and hides them under a white stone. After the third pregnancy, the mother hides two of her sons "on her sleeve" and is banished with them on a barrel cast in the sea. The barrel washes ashore on an island. Both boys grow up in days, and capture a talking pike that tells them to cut it open to find magical objects inside its entrails. They use the objects to build a grand house on the island for themselves and their mother. After a merchant visits the island and reports to their father, the king's son arrives on the island and makes peace with his wife. Sometime later, both sons ask his mother to prepare some cakes with her breastmilk, so they can look for their remaining brothers, still missing. Both brothers spare a seagull who carries them across the sea to another country, where they find their seven brothers under an avian transformation curse.

In a tale from Pudozh, collected in 1939 and published in 1982 with the title "Про кота-пахаря" ("About the Pakharya Cat"), three sisters promise great things if they marry Ivan, the merchant's son; the youngest sister, named Barbara (Varvara), promises to bear three sons with golden arms and a red sun on the front. She marries Ivan and bears three sons, in three consecutive pregnancies, but the sons are replaced for puppies and the third is cast in barrel along with his mother. The son grows up in hours, becomes a young man, and both wash ashore on a deserted island. Whatever he wishes for, his mother blesses him so that his prayers go "from his lips to God's ears". And so appear a magical cat that sings poems and a bath house that rejuvenates people.

In a Karelian tale collected in 1947 and published in 1963 with the title Yheksän kultaista poikua (Russian: Девять золотых сыновей, romanized: Devyat' zolotikh synovei, lit. 'Nine Golden Sons'), a woman has three daughters. One day, they talk among themselves: the elder promises to prepare food for the whole army with just one grain of barley, the middle one that she can weave clothes for the army with only a thread of linen; and the youngest promises to bear three sons with hands of gold, legs of silver, a moon on their temples, pearls in their eyes, the Ursa Major constellation on their shoulders and "heavenly stars" on their backs. The sisters repeat their conversation in a bath house, and the king's son overhears them. The king's son marries the youngest sister and takes her to his palace. On the way back, the couple finds a woman named Suyoatar and take her as their midwife. Suyoatar replaces the children with three wolfcubs and hides the children under a white stone. The same event happens with the next two pregnancies (three crows in the second, and three magpies in the third), but, on the third pregnancy, she hides on son with her. Mother and son are cast in the sea in a barrel, but the barrel washes ashore. They begin to live on an island, and the son asks his mother to sew 8 shirts and bake 8 koloboks with her breastmilk, for he intends to rescue his brothers.

In a Karelian tale collected in 1937 and published in 1983 with the title Kolme sisäreštä (Russian: Три сестры, romanized: Tri sestry, lit. 'Three Sisters'), an old couple have three daughters. One day, during the "vierista" holiday, they pay a visit to the Vierista akka (Old Woman Vierista), but hide in a cow's hide. Vierista drags the girls to a forest and abandons them there. They climb a tree for shelter and the king's son, during a hunt, finds them. The king's son brings them to the palace, and the youngest sister strikes the king's son's fancy the most. While at the castle, the girls go to a bath house and talk to one another: the elder wants to marry the royal cook and promises to weave clothes for the whole army with a single thread; the middle one wants to marry the royal steward and promises to cook food for the whole army with a single grain; the youngest wants to marry the king's son and promises to bear three children, the oldest a daughter, all with hands of gold, legs of silver, a moon on their temples; the Ursa Major on the shoulders and the stars in their back. The children are born, but the sisters replace them by animals and cast in the water. The children are saved by a gardener and, years later, are sent for a fountain of water of life, the ringing tree and the talking bird.

In a Russian-language tale from Vodlozero given the title "Чудесные дети" ("Wonderful Children"), a merchant has three daughters, who one day talk about their abilities: the elder boasts she can weave a shirt from a single thread of linen; the middle one that with a single grain she can bake 40 pies, and the youngest promises to bear 9 sons with arms of silver and legs of gold. Ivan Tsarevich just happens to pass by them and overhear their conversation. He takes the youngest sister to the palace and marries her. One day, she asks her husband about who will help her in labour, and Ivan Tsarevich says a woman named Egi-baba will be her midwife. When the princess gives birth to her sons, in three pregnancies, Egi-baba takes the boys and replaces them for puppies, save for a little boy the princess hides in her sleeve. The princess is cast with her only son in a barrel in the sea, and it washes ashore on an island. The princess's son wishes for a house to be built for them, with tables and food, and his wish is granted. Later, a kaliki visits Ivan Tsarevich and tells him about a woman living on an island with a boy with legs of gold, arms of silver, stars on his back, a red sun on the front and a bright moon on the back of the neck. Later, the boy asks his mother to bake him a cake with her breast milk, and then departs to an oak where his eight elder brothers are hiding out. The eight boys recognize the smell of their mother's milk and go with their younger brother back to their mother. The kaliki visits Ivan Tsarevich again and tells him about the nine boys living with their mother on an island. Ivan Tsarevich realizes his wife and children are alive, punishes Egi-baba, and brings his family back to his kingdom.

=== Veps people ===
Karelian scholarship reports 15 variants from Veps sources. Most of which also follow the Russian (or East Slavic) redaction of the tale type 707 (that is, "The Tale of Tsar Saltan"). In the Russian redaction, mother and son and cast in the sea in a barrel to die; the son grows up inside the barrel and both wash ashore on an island; the son builds a palace for himself and his mother with magic, and goes to rescue his brothers with the aid of koloboks made with their mother's breastmilk; the hero finds marvellous items for his island and reunites with his father.

At least one variant of type 707 was collected from a Veps source by linguist Paul Ariste and published in 1964.

In a Vepsian tale collected in 1947 with the Vepsian title Kuldaine prihä, translated into Russian as "Золотой мальчик" ("Golden Boy"), an old couple have three daughters. One day, while the three sisters are in the bath house, Ivan Tsarevich is spying on their conversation: the elder boasts she can weave three different dresses with one fiber; the middle one that she can cook three loaves of bread with the same dough, and the youngest promises to bear him three valiant sons ("bogatyrs", in the Russian translation), born with hair strands of gold and silver. Ivan Tsarevits then marries the third sister. When she becomes pregnant, the prince goes to look for a midwife, and his wife warns him not to hire Baba Yaga. Ivan Tsarevich walks near the forest and meets an old woman who introduces herself as Baba Yaga. The prince ignores her and keeps walking, until he meets another Baba Yaga, who he brings as his midwife. The third sister bears three sons with hair of gold and silver, whom Baba Yaga sends to the bathhouse to wash and release in the green oak grove, while she brings back three puppies to deceive Ivan Tsarevich. The girl becomes pregnant again, with three sons with hair of gold and silver, and warns her husband not to hire Baba Yaga. Ivan Tsarevich hires Baba Yaga again. Ivan Tsarevich's wife sends only two of her sons to the bath house, while keeping the last one under her right breast, and Baba Yaga sends the boys away, replacing them for puppies. Fooled by the witch, Ivan Tsarevich orders his wife to be cast in an iron barrel in the Onego lake, then marries Baba Yaga's daughter. Back to the girl, her son tells her he wishes to spread his legs, but it is dangerous to do so for they are swaying on the waves. They wash ashore on an island and exit the barrel. They rest on the island in the evening, and, in the morning, a castle appears to them overnight. The boy's mother then utters aloud she wishes his father was there; the boy knocks on a stone, and suddenly his father and brothers appear to live with them.

=== Mordvin people ===
Russian author Stepan V. Anikin published a tale from the Mordvin people titled "Двенадцать братьев" ("Twelve Brothers"). In this tale, a czar's son, still single, likes to overhear the conversation under people's windows. In one house, he overhears three sisters who are spinning and talking: they each talk about marrying the czar's son, but the elder promises to clothe an entire regiment with a single spool of thread; the middle one that she can bake a piece of bread so large to feed two regiments with a single bite, and the youngest promises to bear twelve sons, each with a sun on the front, a moon on the back of the head, stars in their hair. The czar's son chooses the youngest as his wife and marries her. When she is pregnant for the first time, the czar's son looks for a midwife, and finds a woman named Vedyava by the river and hires her. Vedyava takes the first son, hides him elsewhere, and replaces him with a kitten. This happens with the next ten pregnancies, until the czar's son, fed up with the apparently false promises, orders his wife to be locked up in an iron barrel with her last son and cast in the sea. His order is carried out, and the pair sinks to the bottom of the ocean. Fifteen years pass, and son and mother pray to God for the barrel to wash ashore on any island. This happens, and they find themselves on land. The boy finds three men quarreling about an ax, a cloth, and a magic cudgel and steals them to build a house for him and his mother. Later, some fishermen come to the island and depart to visit the czar's son, now the czar himself and married to Vedyava. The boy turns into a little mosquito and flies incognito to his father's court. Vedyava mocks the fishermen's report, and tells of other miraculous sights: first, a boar-pig that plows fields with its paws and sows with its snout; second, a mare that foals with each step; third, a tree with silver bells that ring with the wind, and a singing bird perched on it; lastly, about eleven boys that live somewhere, each with a sun on the front, a moon on the back of the head, and stars in their hair. After each visit, the boy finds the boar-pig, the mare and its foals, the bell-tree and the bird. As for the last sight, the boy recognizes it is about his brothers and asks his mother to bake eleven loaves of bread for the road, then goes on a quest for them. With the help of a magic bird, the boy is carried to the brothers' hut and takes them back to their mother.

=== Mari people ===
Scholar S. S. Sabitov located a similar narrative in the "Catalogue of Tales of Magic from the Mari people", indexed as type 707, "Чудесные дети" ("Wonderful Children)": a girl promises to bear the king twelve bogatyrs; the king marries her and she bears her children, but a sorceress replaces them for puppies; the king issues an order to banish his wife and her children in a barrel and cast them in the sea; mother and son survive and wash on another land; the bogatyr son helps a swan princess and she helps him find wonders for his new home.

=== Mansi people ===
In a tale from the Vogul (Mansi people) published and translated by Finno-Ugricist János Gulya with the title A legkisebb nővér fiacskája ("The Little Son of the Youngest Sister"), each one of three sisters leave home and are forced to marry the same man, an old man who lived in a hut in the woods. One day, before he goes on a hunt, he asks his three wives what they will give him when he returns. The oldest answers she will weave a great linen for him with 100 fathoms, the second that she will weave a heavy 100-pound net, and the third that she will bear him a son with silver arms, golden legs, a sun on the front and the moon on the back of the neck. The boy is born, but cast in the sea and replaced for a little dog. The husband is furious with the third wife, breaks her arms and throws her in the sea with the little dog. They wash ashore on a beach, she heals herself with dew and lives with the little dog in a small cave. The petit animal rescues the little boy with wooden bowls of her breastmilk and takes him to his mother, who confirms their relationship by jets of her breastmilk. The boy grows up in days and builds a house for them on the beach. Sailors come to visit the house and report to the old man their findings. The old man's two wives try to dismiss the sailors' story by telling about even more extravagant sights: a bull with a sauna between its horns, and a birch tree with a cuckoo that produces silver when it sings. The man's son learns of this by a looking glass and commands his servants to have these things on his house.

=== Komi people ===
Russian historian Vladimir Petrukhin reported a Komi-Permyak tale, which he connected to the legend of the "Golden Woman". In the tale, a "golden wife" ("Золотая женщина", in the original) marries a hunter and promises to bear him three golden sons. The hunter goes to search for a midwife and hires witch Yegibaba to help in the delivery of his children. In three consecutive pregnancies, the Yegibaba replaces the babies for little animals, and the golden wife is banished from home, while the hunter marries Yegibaba's daughter. The golden wife herself goes to look for her children and finds them at the witch's hut in the forest. The woman prepares some cakes with her own breastmilk for them to taste, and the boys recognize their mother. The hunter learns the truth, kills Yegibaba and her daughter, and retakes the golden wife as his true spouse.
