= Jábmiidáhkká =

Jábmiidáhkká (also Jabme-akka) is the female ruler of the underworld Jábmiidaibmu in Sámi shamanism.

Jábmiidaibmu wasn't a bad place but the dead missed their relatives, so Jábmiidáhkká sometimes allowed them to cause diseases on the living. If the dead managed to catch the soul of a living person and drag it down to Jábmiidaibmu, the person would fall into a coma or a fatal illness. Jábmiidáhkká could allow the soul to return if sufficient offerings were made. Black animals were sacrificed to her by burying them alive, especially cats and roosters, the latter which were buried under a pile of stones.

A female ruler of the underworld likely wasn't the original concept in Proto-Uralic religion but this development happened in order to portray how everything was opposite in the underworld. The same happened relating to the Finnish beliefs of the female ruler of the underworld, Louhi.

Due to Christian influence, Jábmiidaibmu came to be seen akin to purgatory and Jábmiidáhkká came to be associated with Virgin Mary. Kaarle Krohn compared Jábmiidáhkká to Hel from Norse mythology.
