= Dirty Sanchez (band) =

American electroclash band

- Origin: Los Angeles, California, USA
- Genres: Electroclash, Gothic rock
- Years active: 2001–present
- Label: Hypnotic
- Members: Jackie Beat; Mario Diaz; DJ Barbeau
- Website: wearedirtysanchez.com

Dirty Sanchez is an electroclash band formed in Los Angeles in 2001, including comedy writer Jackie Beat, Mario Diaz and DJ Barbeau.

== Members ==
Barbeau has DJed as an opening act for Duran Duran and Moby. Vocalist Jackie Beat toured with Roseanne Barr as the opening act for her comedy routine. Mario Diaz was the co-owner of the East Village venue The Cock.

The band's tracks "Fucking on the Dancefloor", "Dig It" and "Asymmetric", appear in Eon McKai's adult film Neu Wave Hookers (2006).

== Discography ==
- Really Rich Italian Satanists EP (2004)
1. Asymmetric
2. Dig It
3. Sex Dwarf
4. Fucking on the Dancefloor
- Antonio Says EP (2005)
1. "Really Rich Italian Satanists" (Extended version)
2. "Really Rich Italian Satanists" (Video version)
3. "Fucking on the Dancefloor" (John B. Remix)
4. "Really Rich Italian Satanists" (video) - CD only
- Dirty Sanchez (2006)
1. "Get It Wet"
2. "Really Rich Italian Satanists"
3. "Dinner Party!"
4. "U Got the Look"
5. "Amber on a 3-Way Call"
6. "Youth In Asia"
7. "Hollywood Blvd., 2:17 AM"
8. "Tranny Sex"
9. "(We Hate) Youth & Beauty"
10. "Fucking on the Dance Floor" (John B. Remix)
11. "Backlash"

Dirty Sanchez produced the remix of "Boom Box Chic" for fellow Los Angeles band Le Mans. Liz E. of Freezepop appears on this track. DJ Barbeau produced a remix for the song "Sex with Rich People" by Luxxury.
