= Nine diseases =

Characters from Finnish Mythology

In Finnish mythology, the nine diseases are the sons of Louhi, the goddess of death and disease. She is impregnated by wind or the waves of the sea giant Meri-Tursas. She names them after diseases or disasters. The ninth, a witch and the worst of all, remains unnamed. He, the personification of envy, is banished by his mother to become the scourge of mankind. Other rune versions mention nine diseases by name the witch being the tenth son. Some of them also use more esoteric names such as Nuolennoutaja (Retriever of arrow), Painaja (Strainer or nightmare), Kielen kantaja (Carrier of tongue), Ohimoiden ottaja (Taker of temples), and Sydämen syöjä (Eater of heart), which can as well be interpreted as names of diseases.

== In the Kalevala ==
Elias Lönnrot divided Louhi into two separate characters in the Kalevala: Loviatar, death's blind daughter, giving birth to the diseases and Louhi, the Mistress of Pohjola, acting as the midwife. According to the version told in the Kalevala, the diseases are Pistos (consumption), Ähky (colic), Luuvalo (gout), Riisi (rickets), Paise (ulcer), Rupi (scab), Syöpä (cancer), and Rutto (plague). Louhi sends them to the land of Kalevala where they are defeated by Väinämöinen.

== Excerpt from Kalevala ==
Thus Lowyatar named her offspring,
Colic, Pleurisy, and Fever,
Ulcer, Plague, and dread Consumption,
Gout, Sterility, and Cancer.
And the worst of these nine children
Blind Lowyatar quickly banished,
Drove away as an enchanter,
To bewitch the lowland people,
To engender strife and envy.

== See also ==
- Syöjätär, in one recorded Finnish folk song Syöjätär originates from the tenth child of Loviatar
