= Edward Quist =

American artist (born 1976)

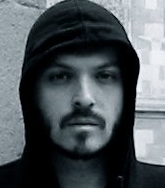
- Born: Edward Paul Quist; December 9, 1976 (age 49); Brooklyn, New York, United States

Edward Quist (born Edward Paul Quist in Brooklyn; 1976) is an American director, screenwriter, producer, composer, and multidisciplinary artist who also works under the name Embryoroom.

== Career ==
Embryoroom has been in operation since the mid-1990s, originating as a production identity and shortly thereafter as an identity which Quist performed multimedia exhibitions and released a number of projects under. Embryoroom has released a number of films and recordings on digital platforms.

In 2008, Quist produced, directed, and scored a two-part series called HAZMASK, consisting of the "intersodes," The Third Rail and Chamber of Aversion. They were released on amazon.com and iTunes. Hazmazk screenedat The Museu d'art Contemporani de Barcelona during the Sónar Festival. That same year, he released Kuvaputki, a DVD based around a close filmed live performance of the band Pan Sonic, produced and directed by Quist and co-produced by Derek Gruen. It screened at the 2008 Sónar Festival and 2008 Milan Film Festival.

In 2015 Quist produced a piece called The Black Vertebrate. It has two versions, a 33-minute installation piece and a feature-length iteration. Split into nine chapters, Quist described it, "as if one is trapped inside an artificial intelligence that is breaking down into some unknown realm of psychosis."

=== Other films ===
- 1993 - Hands
- 1994 - I.L.
- 1996 - Clean Needle
- 1998 - Surgery
- 2000 - Backroom
- 2001 - Suicide
- 2002 - Macca
- 2003 - SICMAN
- 2007 - The Cathodites
