= Future Disco =

British compilation album series

Future Disco is a compilation series and event brand. Their second instalment of the series Future Disco Vol. 2 received the Best Disco Album award on iTunes Best of 2009 list.

== History ==
Future Disco started back in 2009 by Sean Brosnan. Future Disco started as a compilation series and grew to become a record label, radio show, curator and touring DJ act. Their resident DJs have hosted stages at festivals in various countries, including summer residencies at the Space Nightclub in Spain.

Future Disco Vol. 10 – Complete. Repeat. A Disco Drama was released on 25 November 2016, and marks the end of the numerical series. Future Disco 10 will round-up the long running compilation with an edition inspired by the many ups and downs that have befallen the dance world over the years.

The compilation had support from a number of media titles and radio stations including Nemone on 6Music, Earmilk, Thump, DJ Mag, Mixmag, Attack Magazine, and Faze Magazine.

Recent releases of Future Disco include names such as: Alan Dixon, Lifelike, Saison, MAXI MERAKI, Ekkah and Kraak & Smaak.
