= Mika Vainio =

Finnish electronic musician (1963–2017)

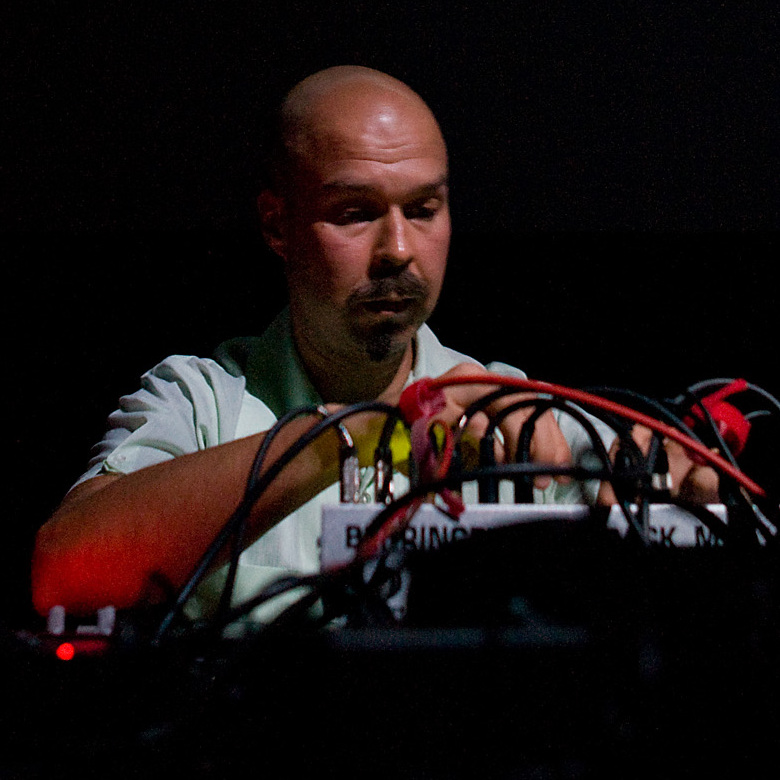
- Vainio in 2006

Background information
- Also known as: Ø; Kentolevi; Philus; Tekonivel
- Born: Mika Tapio Vainio; May 15, 1963; Helsinki, Finland
- Origin: Turku, Finland
- Died: April 12, 2017 (aged 53) Trouville-sur-Mer, France
- Occupations: Musician
- Years active: 1991–2017
- Labels: Sähkö, Blast First, Elektro Music Department
- Formerly of: Pan Sonic
- Website: www.mikavainio.com

Mika Tapio Vainio (May 15, 1963 – April 12, 2017) was a Finnish electronic musician. He was best known as a member of Pan Sonic. In addition to his real name, he recorded under the aliases Ø, Kentolevi, Philus, and Tekonivel.

He has worked with artists such as Alan Vega, Barry Adamson, Charlemagne Palestine, Alva Noto, Peaches, Kevin Drumm, Björk, Stephen O'Malley, Keiji Haino, Michael Gira, Chicks on Speed, Merzbow, and many others.

== Life and career ==
Mika Vainio was born on May 15, 1963, in Helsinki, but grew up in Turku. In the early 1980s, he played in the group Gagarin-Kombinaatti while also working at a slaughterhouse.

In the late 1980s, Vainio began DJing and organizing parties, playing acid house. It was here that he met Tommi Grönlund, who would later found Sähkö Recordings. Sähkö would release much of Vainio's music.

In the mid-1990s, he formed the group Pan Sonic with Ilpo Väisänen and later Sami Salo (who would soon leave). Pan Sonic disbanded in December 2009, playing their final concert on December 18.

Vainio died on April 12, 2017, in Trouville-sur-Mer, France, after falling six meters off a cliff into the sea. The exact circumstances of his death are unknown.
