= Ilpo Väisänen =

Finnish electronic musician

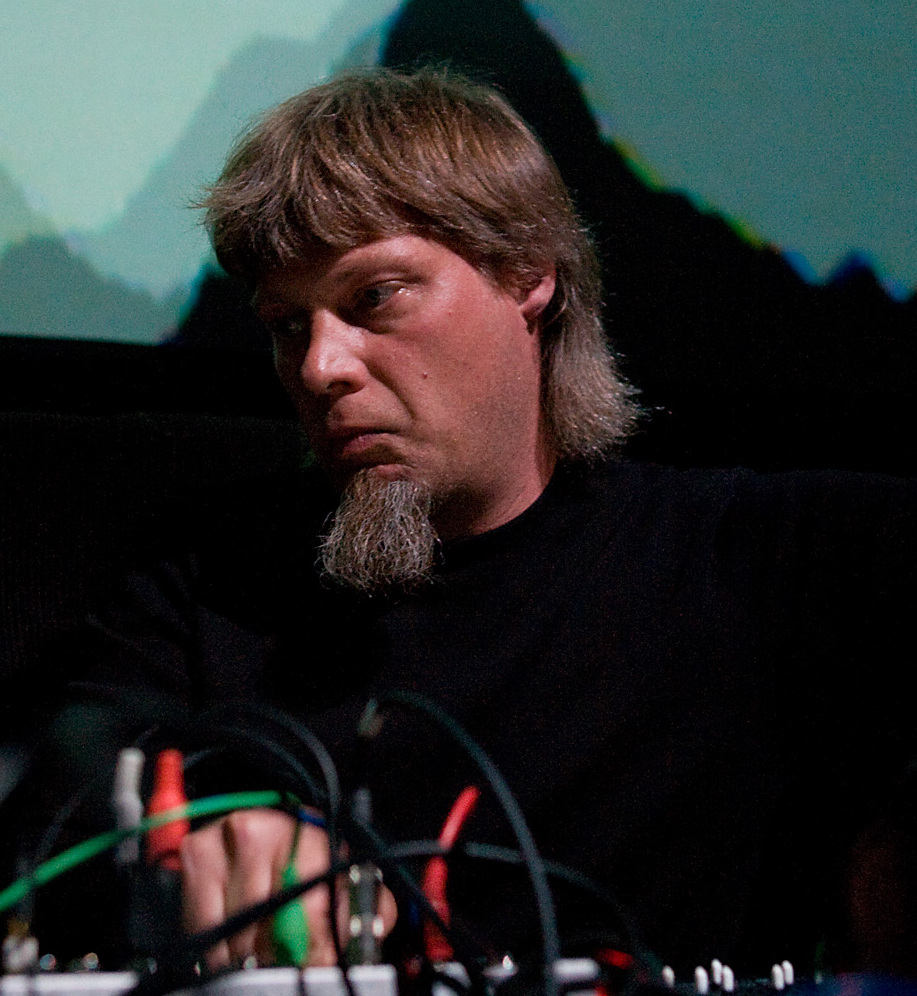
- Ilpo Väisänen live with Pan Sonic 2006

Background information
- Also known as: I-LP-O In Dub, I-LP-ON, Liima, Piiri
- Born: 1963 (age 62–63); Kuopio, Finland
- Occupation: musician
- Years active: since 1992
- Labels: Sähkö, Blast First, Mego
- Formerly of: Pan Sonic

Ilpo Väisänen (born 1963 in Kuopio) is a Finnish electronic musician. He is best known as a member of Pan Sonic. In addition to his real name, he has recorded under the aliases I-LP-O In Dub, I-LP-ON, Liima and Piiri. Together with Dirk Dresselhaus he founded the project Angel, later renamed Die Angel.

== Life and career ==
Väisänen went to Turku in the mid-1980s to study art. There he engaged in different art and music groups. Around 1987 he met and befriended his long-term companion Mika Vainio who performed as a DJ. In the summer of 1993 they founded the group Panasonic, later renamed to Pan Sonic. Their first EP was released in 1994 on Tommi Grönlunds label Sähkö Recordings. That same year Sami Salo became the group's third member, but left it two years later.

In 1998 Väisänen together with Vainio and the Suicide vocalist Alan Vega released the album Endless as Vainio / Väisänen / Vega. In the end of 2001 Väisänen released on the Raster-Noton sublabel Kangaroo as Liima two 10″ singles. The planned longterm cooperation with Raster-Noton did not materialize. He also released under the name Piiri. Dirk Dresselhaus and Väisänen started the project Angel, later renamed Die Angel, in 2002 and have released various albums with a mix of industrial music, minimal music and noise music.

In January 2010 Väisänen and Vainio declared that Pan Sonic would go "into a deep freeze" after the album release of Gravitoni.

The Architekturforum Oberösterreich in 2013 presented a sound installation from Clemens Bauder and Väisänen with the title Sharp Sine Square Wire Chamber Trio as part of the exhibition Architektur und Klang.

Since 2015 Väisänen has released various solo albums as I-LP-O In Dub and I-LP-ON on the Austrian label Mego/Editions Mego. His releases and live performances were well reviewed by international music magazines such as Resident Advisor, The Quietus, The New Noise and hhv mag. In 2018 he released the album Äänet, a homage to Mika Vainio, who had died the year before. In 2022, he released the album Keskipäivän Hetken Sumea Vaillinaisuus for the Berlin-based label I Shall Sing Until My Land Is Free, in support of Ukrainian resistance against the Russian invasion.

== Selected discography ==
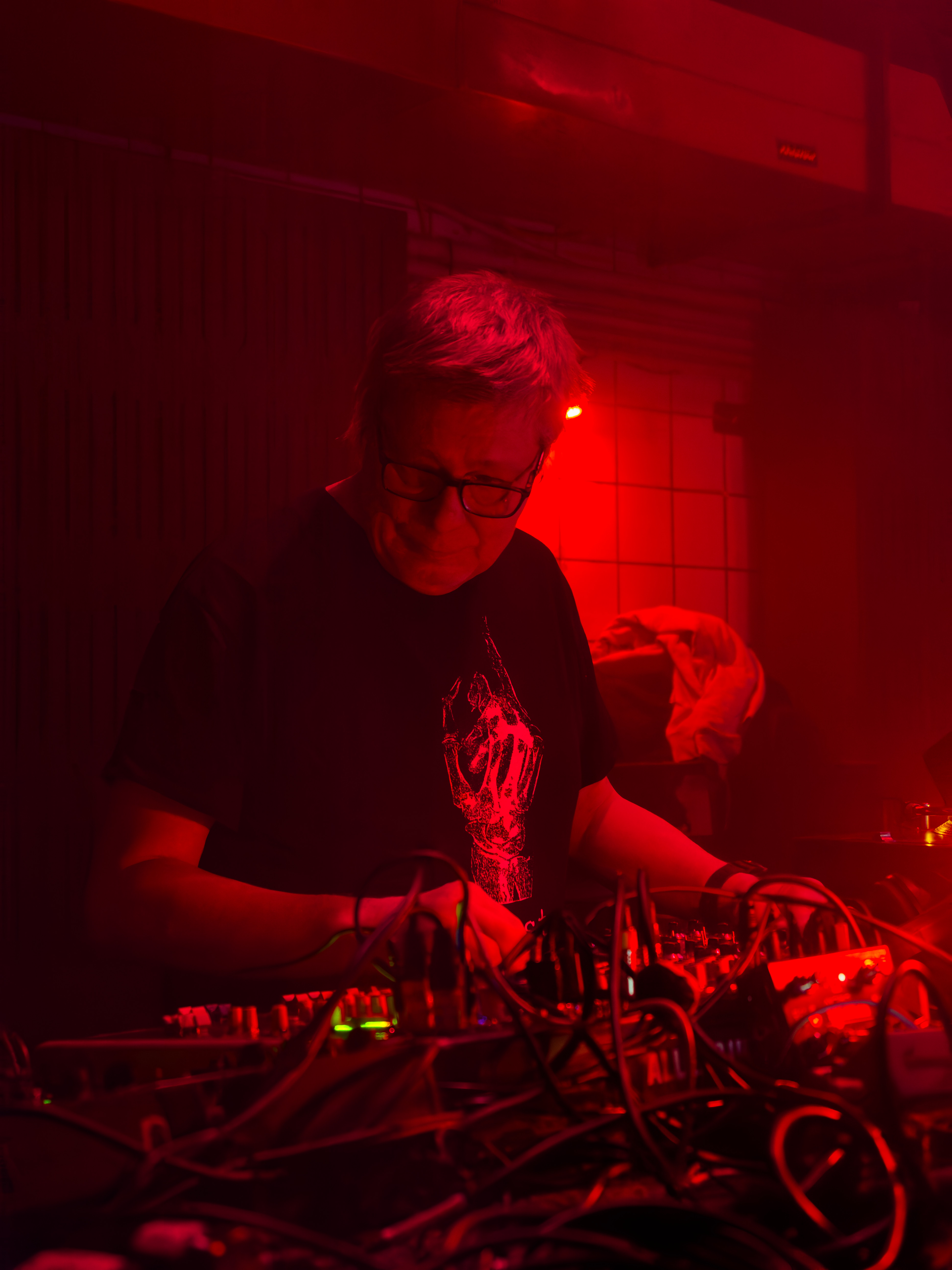
Ilpo Väisänen (2026)

Albums

- 2001: Ilpo Väisänen – Asuma (Mego)
- 2005: John Duncan, Mika Vainio & Ilpo Väisänen – Nine Suggestions (Allquestions)
- 2015: I-LP-O In Dub – Communist Dub (Editions Mego)
- 2016: Ilpo Väisänen – Syntetisaattori Musiikkia Kuopiosta (Kvitnu)
- 2017: I-LP-O In Dub – Capital Dub Chapter 1 (Editions Mego)
- 2018: I-LP-ON – Äänet (Editions Mego)
- 2022: Ilpo Väisänen – Keskipäivän Hetken Sumea Vaillinaisuus (I Shall Sing Until My Land Is Free)
- 2024: Ilpo Väisänen, Carl Michael von Hausswolff – Hommage à Mika Vainio (CC Label)
- 2025: Ilpo Väisänen – Asuma Re-Issue / Vinyl (Editions Mego)
