= Pan Sonic =

Finnish duo

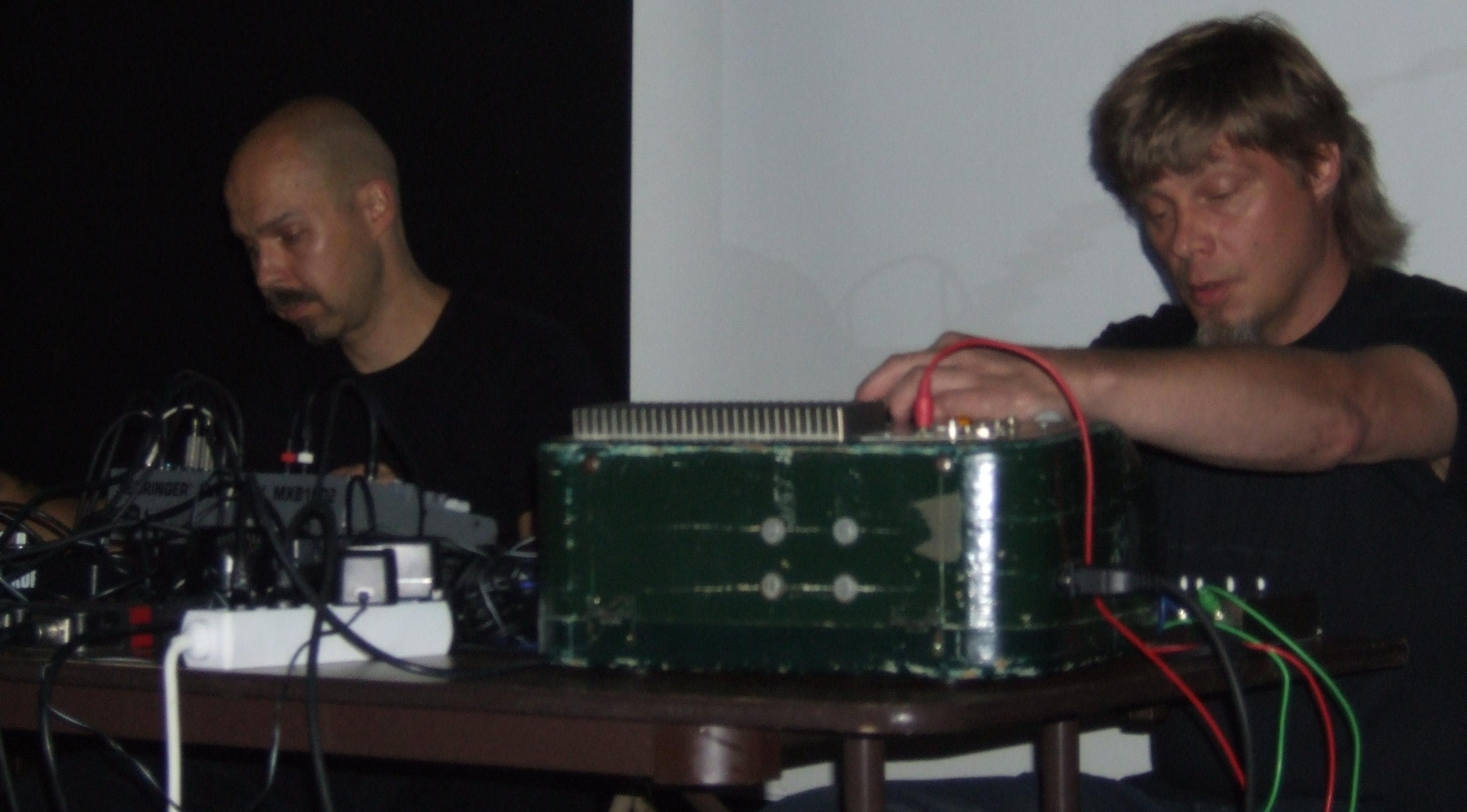
- Pan Sonic in 2006

Background information
- Also known as: Panasonic; Rude Mechanic
- Origin: Turku, Finland
- Genres: Electronic; experimental; industrial; techno; noise; drone; glitch
- Years active: 1993–2009
- Label: Blast First
- Past members: Ilpo Väisänen; Mika Vainio; Sami Salo; Jari Lehtinen

Pan Sonic, previously known as Panasonic, was a Finnish electronic music duo which was founded in Turku in 1993 and which dissolved in 2009. They consisted throughout the duo's run of Mika Vainio and Ilpo Väisänen, with Sami Salo as an initial member and Jari Lehtinen as a later member.

== History ==
In 1988, as part of a sound art performance, the initial duo of Vainio and Väisänen spent 10 hours in a garage, exposed to low-frequency (13 Hz) noise at 125 decibels. They also performed a gig in London's East End from an armoured car, using a 5000 watt sound system allegedly of the type used by the police to disorient rioters. Panasonic subsequently formed in 1993 as a techno group with Salo (previously known under the alias Hertsi), who would later depart in 1998. They moved to operate from a base in Barcelona to escape the long Finnish winters. Vainio moved to Berlin, while Väisänen returned to Kuopio. Their first 12" was released on Finland's Sähkö Recordings, and they eventually went on to sign to Blast First, which they released music on until they dissolved. The corporation of the same name, Panasonic, threatened legal action unless it was changed. The conflict was resolved, and the duo removed the "a" from their name to become "Pan Sonic". This change was alluded to in the title of their 1999 album A. They also collaborated with Alan Vega and Bruce Gilbert on separate projects.

In the 2000s the music of the duo became far more aggressive and atmospheric, with the help of the mutual producer and audio engineer Jari Lehtinen; following a tumultuous makeshift world tour initiated by Vainio, this culminated in the 2004 release of their quadruple album Kesto (234.48:4), which was radically eclectic and featured several tributes to their influences. In addition, they released several collaborations.

In December 2009, news of the duo splitting was announced on PhinnWeb, with Vainio and Väisänen continuing with their own solo projects. Their final album, Gravitoni, was released by Blast First Petite in May 2010. In October 2013, a new Pan Sonic recording titled Oksastus was announced, a live album which was recorded at a concert in Kyiv, Ukraine on June 6, 2009. It was released on February 20, 2014. Pan Sonic also created a soundtrack for the 2015 documentary called Return of the Atom directed by Mika Taanila and Jussi Eerola. The film examines the construction of the Olkiluoto 3 nuclear power plant in Finland. The documentary premiered in Toronto International Film Festival in 2015.

Mika Vainio died on April 13, 2017, at the age of 53.

== Music ==
Pan Sonic's music focused, in a manner similar to mutual musicians like Alva Noto, on pure synthesizer tones with distortion and reverb, emphasizing minimal frequency ranges. They cited their main influences as industrial acts like Throbbing Gristle, Einstürzende Neubauten and Suicide to reggae, hip-hop and dub. Vainio often remarked that their music is a merger of these two schools of music, taking the harsh and pure sounds typical of industrial techno and spacing them out into longer, subdued soundscapes derived from instrumental reggae and dub, which he had been familiar with in Berlin.

Some of their equipment was made by Lehtinen. These and other custom made instruments were responsible for creating the sounds typical to Pan Sonic's music. They also used samplers and an MPC2000 sequencer, although unconventionally. Pan Sonic contributed music on several occasions to Rei Kawakubo's fashion shows.

== Discography ==
Pan Sonic discography
- Studio albums: 12
- Extended plays: 8
- Live albums: 8
- Compilation albums: 1
- Video albums: 1

=== Studio albums ===
Year	Title	Label	Note
1995	Vakio	Blast First	(lit. "constant")
1997	Kulma	Blast First	(lit. "angle" or "corner")
1998	Endless	Blast First	with Alan Vega as Vainio Väisänen Vega
1999	A	Blast First	No. 24 CMJ Radio Top 200
2001	Aaltopiiri	Blast First	(lit. "wave circuit") No. 9 CMJ RPM
2001	The Oval Recording	Mego	with Bruce Gilbert as IBM
2004	Kesto (234.48:4)	Blast First	(lit. "length" or "endurance")
2005	Resurrection River	Mego	with Alan Vega as VVV
2005	Nine Suggestions	Allquestions	with John Duncan as Duncan/Vainio/Väisänen
2007	Katodivaihe	Blast First Petite	(lit. "cathode phase")
2010	Gravitoni	Blast First Petite	(lit. "graviton")
2010	Synergy between mercy and self-annihilation overturned	Blast First Petite	with Keiji Haino
2016	Atomin paluu	Blast First Petite	soundtrack

=== Live albums ===
Year	Title	Label	Note
2000	Mort aux vaches	Mort Aux Vaches	with Charlemagne Palestine
2000	Frost 79° 40'	FM 4.5.1	with Andreas Ammer and F.M. Einheit
2001	05/10/995	Jenny Divers	
2001	19/01/995 20/01/995	Jenny Divers	
2003	V	Les Disques Victo	with Merzbow
2004	Finnexport 2003	Spirals of Involution	
2009	Shall I download a blackhole and offer it to you	Blast First Petite	with Keiji Haino
2014	Oksastus	Kvitnu	

=== Compilation albums ===
Year	Title	Label
1999	X	Blast First

=== EPs ===
Year	Title	Label	Note
1994	Panasonic EP	Sähkö	
1996	Osasto EP	Blast First	(lit. "department" or "unit")
1998	Arctic Rangers	Blast First	
1998	Medal	Blast First	with Alan Vega
1998	"Kolminpeli (Live)"	Evolurbain	split with Vodershow
1999	B	Blast First	
2001	Motorlab #3	Kitchen Motors	with Barry Adamson
2009	Che	Blast First Petite	with Sunn O)))

=== Video albums ===
Year	Title	Label	Note
2008	Kuvaputki	Blast First Petite	directed by Edward Quist
