= Lempo =

Fiend in Finnish folklore

Lempo (Finnish pronunciation: [ˈlempo]) is a demon from Finnish folklore and mythology. Lempo has been connected to the names Lemmes, Lemmas, Lemmätär and Lemmetär (lit. 'Lady Love'), as well as themes of love and fire. The -tär ending names are feminine, but Lempo has also been understood as a male demon in some instances.

== Descriptions ==
Christfried Ganander called Lempo a flying evil spirit who forged evil flying arrows; Lemmes a forest god or faun who planted the alder and is its protector; Lemmas a nymph who stirred iron after it was lifted from bogs; and Lemmetär or Lemmätär a smith maid who pulled the bellows when iron was made and shook trees with her breath.

Matthias Castrén connected the name Lempo to the word lempi 'erotic love'. It was personalized as a capitalized Lempi in love spells. This lempi in spells could be a wild and raging feeling, like lust awoken by an evil witch, so Castrén thought a love god could have thus developed into an evil god. Elias Lönnrot connected the name to the Swedish word slem 'lousy'. Lemmetär is also mentioned in runic songs describing the origin of stones.

A South Savonian description of a love spell explains that when a wife had broken the laws of chastity, Lempi in her had transformed into Lempo and was then driven out of her with a spell. A North Savonian love spell includes expressions of gratitude to Lemmetär at the end of it.

Lönnrot wondered if love ("lempi") was in the process of forming into the god Lempi when Christianity arrived in Finland.

In runic songs, Lempo is connected to fire, which has created theories of Lempo's possible role as a fire haltija. Lemmes or lemmäs means a meteorite which makes a howling sound when falling to the ground, while plural lemmenet means sparks above a campfire. The word lempo means a ball lightning. Similarly, erotic love (lempi) has been described like a flame which flares up within a person. Fire which came with a meteorite crash or ball lightning was considered sacred. There are many similar sounding place names in Lempäälä, such as Lempoinen and Lempää. According to folklore, there was Lempo's cave (Lemmon luola) and Lempo's hole (Lemmon kuoppa) in Lempäälä, the latter near the local church. It has been theorized that these formations could have been caused by meteorite strikes. Local folklore states Lempo was worshipped there before the arrival of Christianity. Both formations were destroyed when a railway was built in the area. It is also possible the place names near Lempäälä originate from a name meaning a place of fire.

According to Lauri Hakulinen, the Old Finnish word *lempä would have meant mythological fire. Partially based on this, author Juha Kuisma presented Lempo as Holy Fire, a fire woman, a fire goddess, who fertilized the fields in slash and burn cultivation. Her worship would've then been replaced by Saint Birgitta in Christian times. Felix Johannes Oinas thought that "Lempo" was a name for a demon even before the arrival of Christianity; the name would originate from "love", as people called the demon their beloved in order to evade its wrath. Ulla-Maija Kulonen believed the name to be connected to the meanings of 'fire' and 'flame', and that it became a swear word due to these meanings.

Equivalents in other languages include Karelian lempo(i) and Ludic and Veps lemboi, also used as swear words and meaning a demon. These were also loaned into Russian. The Finnish word was also loaned into Sámi as the swear word leabbu. In Votic, lemmüz means a similar creature as the Estonian Kratt (in Finnish usually para).

== Demonic Lempo ==
After Christianity came to Finland, the reputation of Lempo worsened: it is portrayed in the folklore usually as an erratic spirit, as love can be capricious, even dangerous, and it could even take control of a being and turn them to destruction.

Lempo brought down the hero Väinämöinen with the help of his two demon cohorts, Hiisi and Paha.

The words "lempo" and "hiisi" are also used as very mild swear words in the Finnish language. Piru is a slightly stronger swear word.

== Sukkamieli ==
Ganander mentioned a being called Sukkamieli (lit. 'sock mind') who he connected to Asmodeus, who caused discord between a wedded couple to make the husband jealous ("to have black socks"). Sukkamieli was called mielen kääntäjä 'changer of minds' and was asked to change the minds of a couple in discord to be loving again. The runic song Ganander refers to has, however, never been collected from anywhere else, which has led researchers to think this song and Sukkamieli could be of later, pseudo-mythological creation. Ganander did not dare write down the sexually explicit love spells of Finnish and Karelian runic song tradition.

Castrén explained the name Sukkamieli as someone who loves socks, and since socks are soft and smooth, the goddess of love was called Sukkamieli because she cared for the weakest and most tender feelings of the heart. He also refers to the verb suksutella 'to entice, to tease'. According to Kaarle Krohn, it was originally siukka mieli 'mental illness' and the whole line siukkamieli-mielen kääntäjä ("the one who changes the mentally ill mind").

"Changing of minds" appears frequently in love spells. One Olonets Karelian runic song speaks of the mind changer as Melutar, though the song is focused on descending through rapids. In Kainuu, North Ostrobothnia and North Savo, names like Mielutar and Mielis-neiti refer to the Mistress of the Forest; in one South Savo song, Mieluutar even refers to the Mistress of Water.

== See also ==
- Love is the Monster

== External links and references ==
- The Kalevala Glossary
- Taivaannaula: Lempo (in Finnish)
