= Hurrah! A Year of Ta-Dah =

Video by Scissor Sisters
- Released: November 12, 2007
- Recorded: July 27, 2007 at The O2 Arena, London, UK
- Genre: Glam rock, Pop rock
- Length: 185 minutes
- Label: Polydor (UK); Universal B0002772-02 (US)
- Producer: Scissor Sisters

Scissor Sisters chronology
Ta-Dah (2006)	Hurrah! A Year of Ta-Dah (2007)	Invisible Light (2010)

Hurrah! A Year of Ta-Dah is the second DVD by the Scissor Sisters, released on November 12, 2007. It contains a live concert filmed at London's O2 Arena as part of the "Kiss You Off" tour in July 2007, as well as a 40-minute documentary, behind-the-scenes footage from the 2007 tour, a 25-minute acoustic gig at an intimate venue, and all four music videos from Ta-Dah.

In the lead up to the release of the DVD, the band asked for video contributions from crowd members who attended the 2007 tour. Several concerts were filmed for this DVD, including concerts at the O2 Arena and Manchester's MEN Arena. Drummer Paddy Boom was not present for the shows filmed for the concert footage due to the death of his mother. New York City drummer Randy Schrager (billed as "Randy Real") performed in his place.

== Track listing ==
=== Disc 1: Hurrah! A Year of Ta-Dah ===
All tracks were recorded live from the O2 Arena.

1. "She's My Man"
2. "I Can't Decide"
3. "Tits on the Radio"
4. "Laura"
5. "Lights"
6. "The Skins"
7. "Contact High"
8. "Take Your Mama"
9. "Music Is the Victim"
10. "Might Tell You Tonight"
11. "The Other Side"
12. "Comfortably Numb"
13. "Kiss You Off"
14. "Paul McCartney"
15. "Land of a Thousand Words"
16. "Filthy/Gorgeous"
17. "Mary"
18. "Return to Oz"
19. "I Don't Feel Like Dancin'"

=== A Year of Ta-Dah ===
A documentary consisting of backstage footage, TV spots and live performances.

=== Music videos ===
1. "I Don't Feel Like Dancin'"
2. "Land of a Thousand Words"
3. "She's My Man"
4. "Kiss You Off"
5. "Filthy/Gorgeous"

=== Extras ===
1. "Lights" (G Cap Acoustic Gig)
2. "Land of a Thousand Words" (G Cap Acoustic Gig)
3. "I Don't Feel Like Dancin'" (G Cap Acoustic Gig)
4. "She's My Man" (G Cap Acoustic Gig)
5. "Transistor" (Live at Wembley 2006)

=== Disc 2: Bonus CD: Live at the O2, London ===
1. "She's My Man"
2. "I Can't Decide"
3. "Lights"
4. "Might Tell You Tonight"
5. "The Other Side"
6. "Kiss You Off"
7. "Paul McCartney"
8. "Land of a Thousand Words"
9. "I Don't Feel Like Dancin'"
