= Kuroko (disambiguation) =

Kuroko are stagehands in traditional Japanese theatre, who dress all in black.

== Fictional characters ==
- Tetsuya Kuroko, the main character of the manga Kuroko's Basketball
- Kuroko (Samurai Shodown), a character in the Samurai Shodown series
- Kuroko (Ninja-Boy), a character in the Power Instinct series
- Kuroko Shirai, a character of the manga A Certain Magical Index and A Certain Scientific Railgun

== Other ==
- Kuroko type deposit, a sub-type of the bimodal-felsic Volcanogenic massive sulfide ore deposit
