= Kuroko =

Stagehands in traditional Japanese theatre, dressed all in black

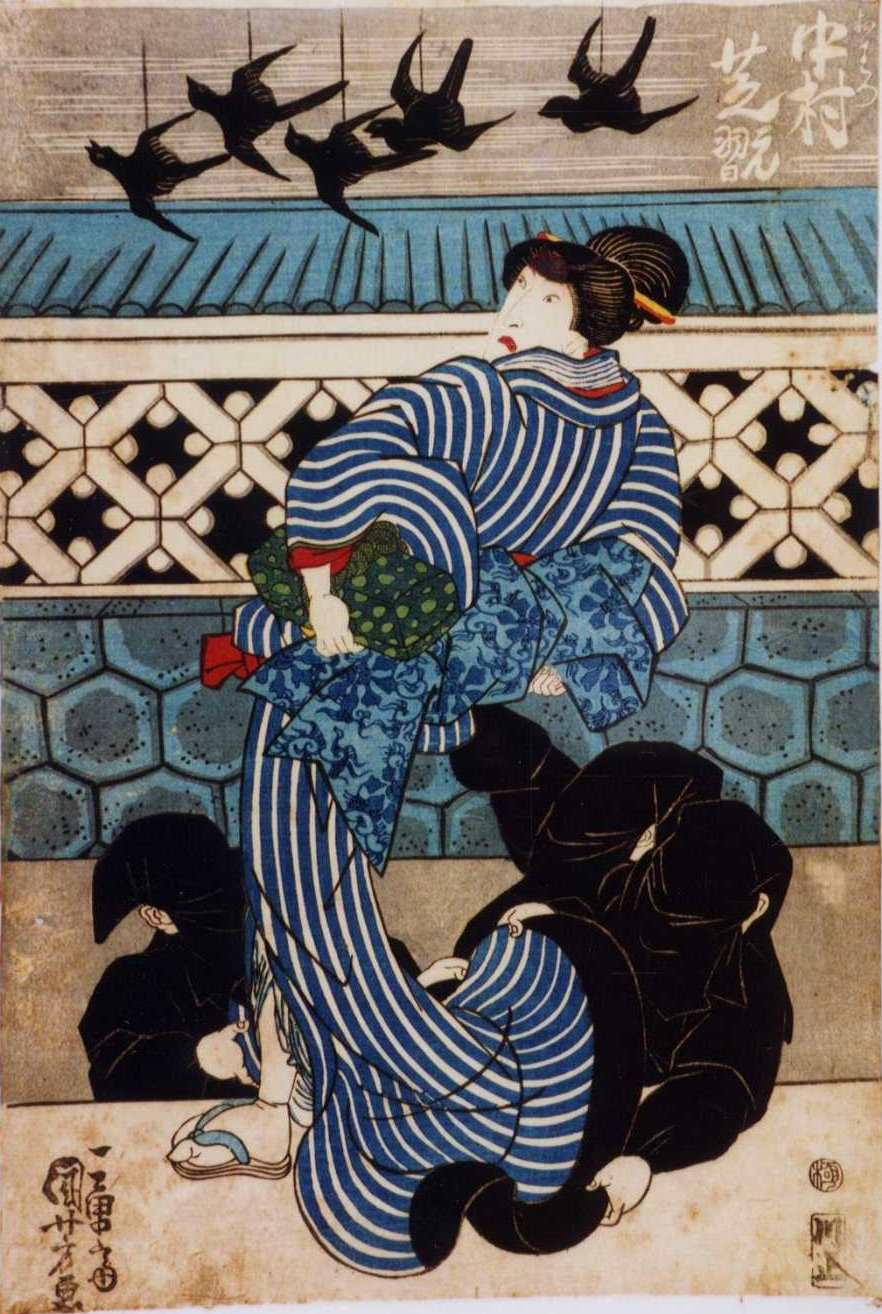
Print by Utagawa Kuniyoshi of actor with three Kuroko

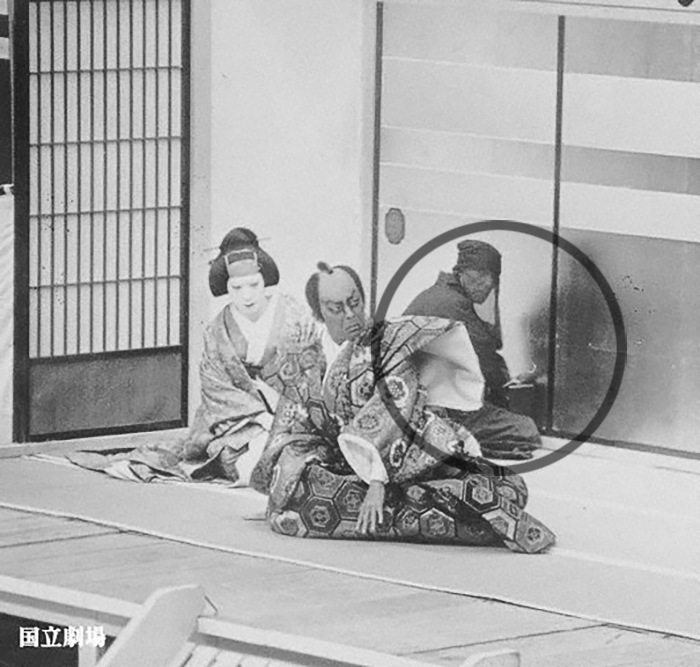
Kuroko behind actors on stage

Kuroko (Japanese: 黒衣; lit. "black clad") are stagehands in traditional Japanese theatre, who dress all in black.

== Lexical background ==
黒衣 is primarily read 'kurogo,' differentiating from the other readings kokui/kokue/kuroginu "black clothes" – the go/gi suffix underlining the 'wearing' intent. Another synonym for the stagehands was also 黒具 'kurogo' "black instrument" as they were meant to serve the performance. Over time, the unvoiced mispronounciation 'kuroko' also started to be used, and needed its own spelling that took the simple 子 ko character as an 'ateji' (sound only), making the 黒子 kuroko word. (Originally though 黒子 was read 'hokuro' and meant "beauty spot.") Hirofumi The two readings kuroko/kurogo are both available for the two spellings 黒衣/黒子.

== Description ==
In kabuki, the kuroko serve many of the same purposes as running crew. They move scenery and props on stage, aiding in scene changes and costume changes. They will also often play the role of animals, will-o-the-wisps, or other roles which are played not by an actor in full costume, but by holding a prop. Kuroko wear all black, head to toe, in order to imply that they are invisible and not part of the action onstage.

== Colour variation ==
The convention of wearing black to imply that the wearer is invisible on stage is a central element in bunraku puppet theatre as well. Kuroko will wear white or blue in order to blend in with the background in a scene set, for example, in a snowstorm, or at sea, in which case they are referred to as "Yukigo" (雪衣, snow clad) or "Namigo" (波衣, wave clad) respectively. As this convention was extended to kabuki actors depicting stealthy ninja, historian Stephen Turnbull suggested that the stereotypical image of a ninja dressed all in black derived from kabuki. The theatrical convention of dressing ninja characters as apparent stagehands to imply stealth and to surprise audiences contributed to this popular image, in contrast to the historical reality that real ninjas usually dressed like civilians.

In Noh theatre, a kōken, wearing black but no mask, serves much the same purpose.

== Examples from popular culture ==
- Kuroko methods were often used by the late Nagi Noda, notably in the Scissor Sisters music video for "She's My Man" and the MEG video for "Precious".
- A Kuroko character appears in some of the Samurai Shodown and Power Instinct video games as the referee, and also a secret playable character occasionally. He also appears in the series' crossover with Granblue Fantasy.
- Kuroko are Ryoko Mendo's personal servants in the manga series Urusei Yatsura.
- Kuroko are used extensively in two Super Sentai series, namely "Ninpuu Sentai Hurricaneger" (2002) and "Samurai Sentai Shinkenger" (2009). In the latter's case, when Kamen Rider Decade crossed over with Shinkenger, Tsukasa Kadoya a.k.a. Kamen Rider Decade appears in the Sentai's world as one of the Kuroko of the Shiba household.
- The title character of Kuroko's Basketball has the ability of misdirection, which makes him quasi-invisible. This is a reference to the invisibility of the kuroko.
- In Monster Musume, Kuroko is the first name of the government agent Ms. Smith. She wears all black and likes to manipulate the other characters and events of the series from the background.
- In the variety show Gaki no Tsukai, Hitoshi Matsumoto is assisted by the other show members -whom are all dressed as Kuroko- in order to achieve nonsensical sports challenges.
- In Tomodachi Collection and in the Japanese version of Tomodachi Life, the shopkeepers wear a Kuroko mask. This was changed to a carved wooden head in the American version, a robot head in the European version, and a racing helmet in the Korean version. The Kuroko mask is available to purchase as a hat that can be gifted to Miis.

== See also ==
- Grip (occupation)
