= Attention Please =

Japanese manga

アテンションプリーズ (Atenshon Purīzu)
- Manga
- Written by: Chieko Hosokawa
- Published by: Kodansha
- Magazine: Shōjo Friend
- Original run: 1970 – 1971
- Volumes: 2
- Television drama
- Studio: Toho
- Original network: TBS
- Original run: August 23, 1970 – March 28, 1971
- Episodes: 32
- Television drama
- Music by: Yugo Kanno
- Studio: Kyodo Television
- Original network: Fuji TV
- Original run: April 18, 2006 – June 27, 2006
- Episodes: 11 + 2 Special

Attention Please (アテンションプリーズ, Atenshon Purīzu) is a manga by Chieko Hosokawa about the training of flight attendants for Japan Airlines originally serialized in Shōjo Friend from Kodansha beginning in 1970. Tokyo Broadcasting System adapted a TV drama from the manga in 1970. Thirty-six years later, Fuji TV produced a new drama series in 2006. The name of the character, Yōko Misaki was used in both versions.

== 1970 version ==
=== Cast ===
| Role | Actor |
|---|---|
| Sanae Tamura | Bunjaku Han |

== 2006 version ==
=== Episodes ===
The 2006 program follows the life of Misaki as she slowly conquers various obstacles to become a flight attendant. Each episode ends with a showcase of the various uniforms that have been used in JAL to a cover of "Oh Pretty Woman" by Kaela Kimura.

| No. | Title | Rating (Kanto) | Original release date |
|---|---|---|---|
| 1 | "The biggest reckless worst new face trainee!!" | 17.7 | April 18, 2006 |
Misaki overhears that guys like female attendants. She attempts to become a flight attendant to impress a fellow member of her band.
| 2 | "Yearning?! for a uniform" | 14.9 | April 25, 2006 |
Misaki "borrows" a CA's uniform and learns first hand the importance of their role in assisting travellers.
| 3 | "Emergency Rescue Training of Hell!!" | 16.8 | May 2, 2006 |
The CA trainees are introduced to emergency training including inflating a life raft.
| 4 | "The first flight for only two people" | 16.0 | May 9, 2006 |
A film producer tries to create a conflict in the CA class.
| 5 | "The way to a CA Hot Mama Style !!" | 15.7 | May 16, 2006 |
Misaki tries various beauty techniques to improve her looks.
| 6 | "I Hate You!!" | 15.3 | May 23, 2006 |
The CA trainees are taught CPR.
| 7 | "The Last Class...a reason for tears..." | 15.4 | May 30, 2006 |
Each of the CA trainees have to pass a test before being allowed to go on an OJT (On-the-Job Training). Everyone passes, except for Misaki.
| 8 | "Confession....the first date in the sky..." | 16.9 | June 6, 2006 |
Misaki is disappointed not being allowed on OJT and feels like quitting. Shōta cheers her up with a short flight on a light plane. Misaki refocusing on the test and passes the second time.
| 9 | "First Flight...love of two people..." | 15.7 | June 13, 2006 |
Misaki has her first experience being a trainee on a flight.
| 10 | "Fly!! Step on the Wings of Love" | 19.2 | June 20, 2006 |
There is a flight delay due to a warning light, which causes the passengers to be very irritated. Misaki and the rest of the crew have to deal with the situation, while Shota investigates the fault.
| 11 | "To the sky!! At the time of departure..." | 16.5 | June 27, 2006 |
A passenger collapses during a flight, and Misaki has to overcome her fears to help. Misaki graduates with the rest of her classmates and puts on a final concert for everyone.
| SP1 | "Honolulu, Hawaii edition" | 17.2 | January 13, 2007 |
Misaki re-enters training before starting her first international flight to Hawaii, while also having to deal with her messy personal relationship with Shota
| SP2 | "Sydney, Australia edition" | 13.3 | April 3, 2008 |
Misaki, Wakamura & Sekiyama prepare to head to Sydney to create a short film for the airline. Misaki involved in a tension with a new flight attendant trainee

=== Cast ===
- Aya Ueto as Misaki Youko
- Ryo Nishikido as Nakahara Shota
- Miki Maya as Mikami Tamaki
- Saki Aibu as Wakamura Yayoi
- Chihiro Otsuka as Sekiyama Yuki
- Misa Uehara as Hirota Saori
- Kotaro Koizumi as Tsutsumi Shuusuke
- Fumiyo Kohinata as Sakurada Shinya
- Yuko Fueki as Asou Kaoru
- Natsumi Nanase as Kinoshita Asami
- Minami Otomo as Higashino Haruka
- Mariko Takahashi as Kagawa Reiko
- Mantaro Koichi as Watanabe Makoto
- Kazuyuki Asano as Wakamura Shozo
- Inoue Jun as Dazai Shinichiro
- Mano Yuuko as Murayama Mizuho
- Hoshino Natsuko as Takemoto Rie
- Tanaka Sogen as Ooki Mitsuya
- Ishikawa Maki as Chief Nagano

Yōko Misaki (美咲 洋子, Misaki Yōko)
Misaki is a lead singer of a rock band. She lost her mother at young age and was raised with her three brothers. She is very boyish in nature and prefers male to female company. She enrolls to become a flight attendant to gain the attention of another band member after he mentions about how she would look like in a uniform. She finds training in flight attendant academy to be difficult but manages to overcome various obstacles with a unique persistence. She slowly wins respect of her instructors and batchmates.
Shōta Nakahara (中原 翔太, Nakahara Shōta)
Shōta is a mechanic working for JAL. He has always wanted to be a pilot on a commercial airliner but could not become one as he did not have perfect eyesight. He is still allowed to pilot small aircraft and takes Misaki on a trip during the series to cheer her up. He first met her in the first episode where she accuses him of stealing her train ticket. Reserved and quiet, he and Misaki initially do not get along however become close friends by the end of the series.

=== Soundtrack ===
1. Oh Pretty Woman - Kaela Kimura
2. Attention Please ~ Main Theme
3. What Am I Gonna Do
4. Head Wind
5. Circle of my Life
6. A Goody Goody
7. Attention Please ~ (Love Theme)
8. Turbulence
9. Mock up
10. Fight Irregularity
11. Go Around
12. Stage of The Sky
13. Normally Hidden Function
14. Do Really
15. Break Down
16. Painful And Embarrassed
17. Link to The Future
18. Attention Please ~ (End Title)
19. Oh Pretty Woman ~ (Instrumental)

== January 2007 special ==
A special was aired in January 2007. Misaki was given her first international assignment to Hawaii. In this special Misaki has to play matchmaker to bring two people together. At the end, Misaki gains the courage and is about to tell Shota that she likes him but is interrupted with a rare green sunset, 'Green Flash' in Hawaii. That sunset foretells that a couple who sees the Green Flash will live happily together forever.

=== Cast ===
- Aya Ueto as Misaki Youko
- Ryo Nishikido as Nakahara Shota
- Miki Maya as Mikami Tamaki
- Saki Aibu as Wakamura Yayoi
- Chihiro Otsuka as Sekiyama Yuki
- Misa Uehara as Hirota Saori
- Kotaro Koizumi as Tsutsumi Shuusuke
- Yuko Fueki as Asou Kaoru
- Natsuki Harada as Risa Nakata
- Bokuzo Masana as Todoroki Hiroto
- Hori Mayumi as Ito Nanako
- Ito Masayuki as a passenger
- David Hirokane as Mr. Nakata
- Yatsu Isao as the taxi driver
- Ideguchi Tetsuya & Kawamoto Chiaki as the newlyweds
- Katsukura Keiko as a passenger
- Taira Chiharu as the young mother
- Yamase Shota as the high-spirited child

== April 2008 special ==
There was a second special aired in April 2008. Misaki imagines and dreams of becoming the top cabin attendant in the world. She has ongoing conflicts with a new trainee CA, who is serious. She then heads to Sydney with Wakamura and Sekiyama and gets into an argument with them as Misaki is trying to steal the spotlight for a blog on their airlines CA website. Meanwhile, Sekiyama has feelings for Tsutsumi, but gets upset when he flirts with another woman while Wakamura worries about her father's health. On the other hand, it is revealed that Shōta is in India.

=== Cast ===
- Aya Ueto - Youko Misaki (Flight Attendant Trainee)
- Ryo Nishikido - Shota Nakahara (Flight Engineer)
- Maya Miki - Tamaki Mikami (Flight Attandent Trainee Instructor)
- Saki Aibu - Yayoi Wakamura (Flight Attendant Trainee)
- Misa Uehara - Saori Hirota (Flight Attendant Trainee)
- Chihiro Otsuka - Yuki Sekiyama (Flight Attendant Trainee)
- Fumiyo Kohinata - Shinya Sakurada (Pilot)
- Koutaro Koizumi - Shusuke Tsutsumi (Inexperienced Pilot)
- Yuko Fueki - Kaoru Asou (Senior Flight Attendant)
- Minami Ootomo - Haruka Higashino (Flight Attendant Trainee)
- Natsumi Nanase - Asami Kinoshita (Flight Attendant Trainee Instructor)
- Mariko Takahashi - Reiko Kagawa (ep.1-4)
- Mantaro Koichi - Makoto Watanabe (Flight Engineer)
- Kazuyuki Asano - Shozo Wakamura (Noodle Shop Owner, Yayoi's father)
- Jun Inoue - Shinichirō Dazai (Department Head of Flight Attendant Trainee)
- Yuuko Mano - Mizuho Murayama (Senior Flight Attendant)
- Natsuko Hoshino - Rie Takemoto (Flight Attendant Trainee)
