= Academy (2007 film) =

- Kanji: アカデミー
- Directed by: Gavin Youngs
- Written by: Gavin Youngs
- Produced by: Fumiko Honma
- Starring: Mariko Takahashi; Paul Ashton; Erica Baron; Megan Drury; Taiyo Sugiura; Daniel Maloney; Nick Hose
- Cinematography: Marden Dean
- Music by: Eiko Yamaguchi; THEME SONG：LISA「brilliant starr」
- Distributed by: Annie Planet
- Release date: 2 June 2007
- Running time: 111 minutes
- Countries: Australia; Japan
- Languages: English; Japanese

Academy (アカデミー) is a 2007 film directed by Gavin Youngs. It stars Mariko Takahashi, Paul Ashton, Erica Baron, Megan Drury, Taiyo Sugiura, Daniel Maloney, and Nick Hose.

== Cast ==
- Mariko Takahashi as Chiho
- Paul Ashton as Matthew
- Erica Baron as Michelle
- Megan Drury as Karen
- Taiyo Sugiura as Takashi
- Daniel Maloney as Wade
- Nick Hose as Byron
- Robert Ian Evans as Luc
- Jeff Bowen as Petersen

== See also ==
- List of lesbian, gay, bisexual or transgender-related films
