= Magic Hour (Scissor Sisters album) =

2012 studio album by Scissor Sisters

Studio album by Scissor Sisters
- Released: May 25, 2012
- Genre: Dance-pop; nu-disco; new wave; house
- Length: 43:46
- Label: Polydor
- Producer: Stuart Price; Alex Ridha; Scissor Sisters; Pharrell Williams

Scissor Sisters chronology
iTunes Festival: London 2010 (2010)	Magic Hour (2012)

Singles from Magic Hour
- 1. "Only the Horses" Released: May 13, 2012; 2. "Baby Come Home" Released: July 22, 2012; 3. "Let's Have a Kiki" Released: September 11, 2012

Magic Hour is the fourth studio album by American band Scissor Sisters, released on May 25, 2012, by Polydor Records. The first single from the album was initially "Shady Love" but was later replaced by "Only the Horses", co-produced by recording artist and DJ Calvin Harris, which entered and peaked at number 12 on the UK Singles Chart.

== Background ==
Lead singer Jake Shears tweeted on October 31, 2011, that the album was almost finished. A song from the new album titled "Shady Love" debuted on Annie Mac's BBC Radio 1 show on January 2, 2012, which features guest vocals from Azealia Banks and Jake Shears under his pseudonym Krystal Pepsy.

Shears said the new record is "a sweet joyful mélange of beat-driven future-pop. It style-hops all over the place unabashedly." For the record, the band worked with a diverse list of collaborators, including Calvin Harris, Pharrell Williams, Diplo, Alex Ridha and Azealia Banks.

The album was recorded over the previous year in both New York and London. On March 13, 2012, Scissor Sisters announced the title of their fourth album and announced that the album would be released on May 28, 2012, in the UK and May 29, 2012, in the US. The first single, "Only the Horses", was officially released on May 13, 2012.

Shears revealed in the bonus DVD that the song "The Secret Life of Letters" is the only song that was not newly written for the album. In some countries, "Fuck Yeah" is included as a bonus track together with two other remixes of the album tracks.

The Scissor Sisters are also credited with popularising the slang term Kiki, with its previous use limited to and created in the 1990 documentary film Paris Is Burning.

== Release and promotion ==
Upon revealing the album's title and release date, the band also announced several concerts to promote the release. The band scheduled one show at the Bowery Ballroom in New York on May 6, 2012, and two concerts at London's O_{2} Shepherd's Bush Empire on May 16 and May 17, 2012, to coincide with the album release. The shows allowed the band to debut the new material in a live setting, a week before the record's official release. Fans were also given an exclusive pre-sale to get early tickets via the band's website. On May 23, two days before the album's release, Scissor Sisters released an infomercial-style commercial starring Queens of the Stone Age's lead singer Joshua Homme on their YouTube channel.

=== Singles ===
On January 2, 2012, BBC Radio 1 premiered the song "Shady Love". It was set to be released as a single on February 12, 2012, but the release was cancelled for unknown reasons. Instead, "Only the Horses" was released as the album's lead single on April 13, 2012, with a remix EP released on May 13, 2012. On the week of May 8, 2012, the album went up for pre-order on the European iTunes Stores. As a pre-order bonus, "San Luis Obispo" was made available for purchase as a promotional single. Similarly, the track "Let's Have a Kiki" was also made available for streaming on Spotify. "Baby Come Home" was released as the second official single from the album on July 22, 2012. The music video for the song was released on May 30, 2012. "Let's Have a Kiki" was released as the third official single on September 11, 2012, in the US and September 18, 2012, in the UK. The single topped the Hot Dance Club Songs chart in the US, following the release of a viral video made for the song by Craig MacNeil of Videodrome Discothèque that increased exposure for the track. It was subsequently picked up for dance airplay in the US and saw the release of promotional CDs featuring remixes of the track.

== Critical reception ==
Professional ratings
Aggregate scores
Source	Rating
Metacritic	67/100
Review scores
Source	Rating
AllMusic	3.5/5 stars
Consequence of Sound	3.5/5 stars
Drowned in Sound	6/10
Entertainment Weekly	B
The Guardian	3/5 stars
NME	6/10
Pitchfork	5.3/10
PopMatters	6/10
Rolling Stone	2.5/5 stars
Slant Magazine	2.5/5 stars

Magic Hour received generally positive reviews from critics upon its release. At Metacritic, which assigns a normalized rating out of 100 to reviews from mainstream critics, the album received an average score of 67 based on 22 reviews, which indicates "generally favorable reviews".

Mixmag gave the album four out of five and said, "Smoky, slow-paced, disco soul with Bee Gees-style falsetto harmonising, it's the type of grown-up pop Scissor Sisters can pull off like few others." Similarly, Uncut gave it a score of four out of five stars and said that it was "full of melodies that feel effortless and instantly classic." musicOMH also gave it four stars out of five and said, "This is the sound of a band truly enjoying themselves in the studio, confident enough in their abilities to freely collaborate with other big names." Canadian newspaper Now gave the album three stars out of five and said, "The production sometimes eclipses the songwriting."

Some reviews were mixed or negative. The Phoenix gave it two stars out of four and said that it "lives up to the promise of its hilarious, zebra-centric-2001: A Space Odyssey cover art. But the wheels fall off with 'Year of Living Dangerously,' a campy, aimless doodle not even rescued by its random violin solo." No Ripcord gave it three out of ten stars and called it not just "exactly bad", but "boring".

== Commercial performance ==
The album debuted at number four on the UK Albums Chart with sales of 19,297 copies, behind Gary Barlow's Sing, Paloma Faith's Fall to Grace, and Rumer's Boys Don't Cry.

== Track listing ==
Magic Hour track listing
No.	Title	Writer(s)	Producer(s)	Length
1.	"Baby Come Home"	John Stephens; Scott Hoffman; Jason Sellards; Ana Lynch	Scissor Sisters; Alex Ridha	3:00
2.	"Keep Your Shoes On"	Sellards; Hoffman; Ridha	Scissor Sisters; Ridha	2:51
3.	"Inevitable"	Sellards; Hoffman; Pharrell Williams	Scissor Sisters; Williams	3:53
4.	"Only the Horses"	Hoffman; Sellards; Amanda Ghost; Ridha	Scissor Sisters; Ridha; Calvin Harris^{[a]}	3:38
5.	"Year of Living Dangerously"	Hoffman; Sellards; Ridha; Thomas Pentz	Scissor Sisters; Ridha	3:52
6.	"Let's Have a Kiki"	Sellards; Hoffman; Lynch	Scissor Sisters	3:50
7.	"Shady Love"	Sellards; Hoffman; Ridha; Azealia Banks	Scissor Sisters; Ridha	3:56
8.	"San Luis Obispo"	Sellards; Hoffman	Scissor Sisters	3:48
9.	"Self Control"	Sellards; Hoffman; Lynch	Scissor Sisters; Ridha^{[b]}	3:12
10.	"Best in Me"	Hoffman; Sellards; Ridha	Scissor Sisters; Ridha	3:44
11.	"The Secret Life of Letters"	Sellards; Hoffman; Joan Wasser	Scissor Sisters; Stuart Price	3:48
12.	"Somewhere"	Sellards; Hoffman; Ridha	Scissor Sisters; Ridha; Price^{[b]}	3:40
13.	"Ms. Matronic's Magic Message" (bonus track)			0:27

US iTunes Store bonus track
No.	Title	Writer(s)	Producer(s)	Length
14.	"Shady Love" (Tommie Sunshine & Disco Fries Remix)	Sellards; Hoffman; Ridha; Banks	Scissor Sisters; Ridha	7:06

UK bonus tracks
No.	Title	Writer(s)	Producer(s)	Length
14.	"Fuck Yeah"	Sellards; Hoffman; Lynch	Scissor Sisters; Ridha	3:03
15.	"Let's Have a Kiki" (DJ Nita Remix)	Sellards; Hoffman; Lynch	Scissor Sisters	6:54
16.	"Fuck Yeah" (Seamus Haji Remix)	Sellards; Hoffman; Lynch	Scissor Sisters; Ridha	3:52

UK iTunes Store bonus track
No.	Title	Writer(s)	Producer(s)	Length
17.	"Shady Love" (Tommie Sunshine & Disco Fries Remix)	Sellards; Hoffman; Ridha; Banks	Scissor Sisters; Ridha	7:06

Deluxe edition CD-ROM content
No.	Title	Length
1.	"Album Track-by-Track by Jake Shears"
2.	"Only the Horses" (Video)
3.	"Only the Horses" (Behind the Scenes Video)
4.	"Baby Come Home" (Video)
5.	"Baby Come Home" (Behind the Scenes Video)

=== Notes ===
- ^{^[a]} signifies a co-producer
- ^{^[b]} signifies an additional producer

== Charts ==
Chart performance for Magic Hour
Chart (2012)	Peak position
Australian Albums (ARIA)	27
Belgian Albums (Ultratop Flanders)	72
Belgian Albums (Ultratop Wallonia)	74
Canadian Albums (Nielsen SoundScan)	47
Croatian Albums (HDU)	23
Dutch Albums (Album Top 100)	68
French Albums (SNEP)	104
Irish Albums (IRMA)	15
Italian Albums (FIMI)	71
Japanese Albums (Oricon)	114
Scottish Albums (OCC)	4
Spanish Albums (Promusicae)	65
Swiss Albums (Schweizer Hitparade)	62
UK Albums (OCC)	4
US Billboard 200	35
US Top Dance Albums (Billboard)	1

== Release history ==
Release history for Magic Hour
Region	Date	Label
Australia	May 25, 2012	Universal
United Kingdom	May 28, 2012	Polydor
United States	May 29, 2012	Casablanca
