= Crest of the Royal Family =

Japanese manga series

- Cover of the first tankōbon volume, featuring Carol Reed

王家の紋章 (Ōke no Monshō)
- Genre: Historical fantasy
- Manga
- Written by: Chieko Hosokawa
- Published by: Akita Shoten
- Magazine: Princess
- Original run: September 6, 1976 – present
- Volumes: 70
- Original video animation

Crest of the Royal Family – Illustration, Story & Video
- Directed by: Akio Miyake
- Produced by: Atsunori Yamaguchi
- Written by: Chieko Hosokawa and Fūmin
- Music by: Joe Hisaishi
- Studio: Toei Video (production), Toei Co., Ltd. (release)
- Released: March 1996
- Runtime: 40 minutes
- Episodes: 1

Crest of the Royal Family (王家の紋章, Ōke no Monshō) is a Japanese shōjo manga written and illustrated by Chieko Hosokawa. It has run in the monthly magazine Princess since September 6, 1976. In 1991, it received the 36th Shogakukan Manga Award for shōjo. As of 2015, the collected volumes had sold 40 million copies in Japan, making it the fourth best-selling shōjo manga ever. With 70 volumes (as of September 2025), it is one of the longest-running manga series of all time. The manga has been adapted into 2 anime drama CD's released in 1990 by Pony Canyon (reprinted in 2004) and an anime OVA produced by Toei Animation. It was adapted into a stage musical in 2016.

== Story ==
The main character, Carol Reed, is a 16-year-old blonde-haired, blue-eyed American teenager from a wealthy family who has an interest in Egyptology and is studying in Cairo. When her mentor discovers the tomb of a young pharaoh, a curse is put on the excavation team and Carol. The curse sends her back in time to ancient Egypt, where she becomes embroiled in the affairs of Egypt and other ancient countries such as Assyria and Babylonia. Carol meets Memphis, a handsome young pharaoh whose tomb she excavated in modern times. Despite his headstrong, at first violent nature, they fall deeply in love. This angers Memphis's older half-sister, the Priestess Isis, who has longed to marry him. Carol, due to her exotic looks and curious ability to tell the future, becomes a major player in ancient history.

== Characters ==
=== Main characters ===
- Carol Reed (キャロル・リード, Kyaroru Rīdo)

Voiced by Keiko Han (OVA)/ Miyuki Sawashiro (Drama CD)
The heroine of the story—a blonde-haired, blue-eyed American teenager who studies archaeology in Cairo. When she got cursed, she was sent back 3000 years ago and meets the cruel but handsome Pharaoh, Memphis. Due to her vast knowledge of ancient Egyptian history, Carol is able to help Egypt through difficulties and because of that, the people of Egypt hail her as the Daughter of the Nile, Guardian of Egypt. Due to her beauty and intelligence, Carol is constantly surrounded by danger in the ancient world, since people either want to kill her or keep her for themselves.

- Memphis (メンフィス, Menfisu)

Voiced by Akira Kamiya (OVA)/ Yūki Kaji (Drama CD)
The 17-year-old pharaoh of the ancient Egypt 3000 years ago. At first, Memphis is shown as a cruel and spoiled Pharaoh, but later, we see his softer side as he develops feelings towards Carol. His name is based on the ancient capital of the Egyptian Empire, Memphis.

- Isis (アイシス, Aishisu)

Voiced by Kazuko Sugiyama (OVA)/ Romi Park (Drama CD)
The Princess and High Priestess of ancient Egypt (she rules Lower Egypt) and elder sister of Memphis. She is madly in love with her younger brother and wants to kill Carol to take her place as Egyptian Queen (by her younger brother's side), believing that she will make Egypt stronger and more prosperous. Isis hides her cruelty and hatred of Carol behind her beauty and is always plotting to kill Carol in numerous ways. Her name is based on the Egyptian goddess Isis.

=== Supporting characters ===
==== Modern Days ====
- Ryan Reed (ライアン・リード, Raian Rīdo): eldest brother of Carol. He cares about her more than anything. Ryan is depicted as a clever young man and he manages his father's company after his death.
- Rody Reed (ロディー・リード, Rodī Rīdo): second eldest brother of Carol.
- President Reed (リード社長, Rīdo-shachō): father of Carol. He died from being bitten by a cobra controlled by Isis, because he broke into the Royal Grave.
- Mrs. Reed (リード夫人, Rīdo fujin): mother of Carol. She loves her much and always has her best interests at heart.
- Maria (マリア, Maria): the old joyful nanny of Carol.
- Professor Brown (ブラウン教授, Buraun-kyōju): grandfather of Jimmy Brown, he wants to take Carol as his granddaughter-in-law. A brilliant archaeologist who found the tomb of Memphis with Carol and her friends.
- Jimmy Brown (ジミー・ブラウン, Jimī Buraun): A childhood friend of Carol. He is in love with her and wants to marry her.
- Ahmad (アフマド, Afumado): the young son of an Arabian oil tycoon.

==== Ancient World ====
===== Kingdom of Egypt =====
- Nefermaat (ネフェルマアト, Neferumaato): the deceased father of Memphis and Isis. He was named after the historical Nefermaat.
- Tahrir (タヒリ, Tahiri): the second wife of King Nefermaat, formerly a Princess of Nubia. She murdered her husband, attempting to marry his son. She failed to do so.
- Imhotep (イムホテップ, Imuhoteppu): the prime minister of Egypt with a bright and calm personality. He was named after Imhotep.
- Minue (ミヌーエ, Minūe): a general of Egypt, he is loyal to Memphis and in love with Isis.
- Naptera (ナフテラ, Nafutera): a female official. She is the mother of Minue.
- Unas (ウナス, Unasu): personal guard of Memphis and later Carol. Born into slavery, young Memphis took him into his service on a whim while the prince was still a little boy rampaging outside of imperial palace.
- Ruka (ルカ, Ruka): a loyal servant of Prince Ismir who is sent- undercover- to Egypt to protect Carol, and to bring Carol to Ismir whenever possible. He and Carol form a close friendship.
- High Priest Gupta (カプター大神官, Kaputā-Daishinkan): the philogynist priest of Egypt. He harbours less than pure interest in Carol. He is obsessed with gold, and a golden-haired goddess would be his most valuable piece of collection.
- Teti (テティ, Teti): a loyal confidant of queen Carol.
- Hassan (ハサン, Hasan): a young merchant traveling across deserts. He is also a doctor. He helps his uncle Careb to kidnap Carol from Hittite to Assyria.
- Careb (カレブ, Karebu): an old greedy merchant.
- Ari (アリ, Ari): confident of princess Isis.
- Nebamen (ネバメン, Nebamen): the imposter prince of Egypt. He was Nemen (ネメン, Nemen), a prisoner under sentence of death. Using the items of a secret grave of a daughter of King Nefermaat in the desert, he counterfeits the evidence to become a royal.
- Berto (ベルト, Beruto): the former jail-mate of Nebamen.
- Mekmek (メクメク, Mekumeku): an ambitious woman sent to the Egyptian palace by Kapta as a palace maid.

===== Kingdom of the Hittites =====
- King of the Hittites (ヒッタイト王, Hittaito-Ō): a cruel and perverted king. He is philogynist.
- Queen of the Hittites (ヒッタイト王妃, Hittaito-Ōhi): Ismir and Mitamun's mother.
- Ismir (イズミル, Izumiru)

Voiced by Kaneto Shiozawa / Takahiro Sakurai
The young, handsome crown prince of the Hittites (present day Turkey). He distinguishes himself in the story as a valiant warrior, and at the same time, a wise, intelligent, cunning strategist of the Hittite army. Believing that Memphis killed his beloved younger sister Mitamun, he decides to disguise himself as a Palestinian merchant and secretly enters Egypt. There he falls in love with Carol at first sight. Besides Memphis, no one else in the story loves Carol as much as Ismir does.

- Mitamun (ミタムン, Mitamun): the younger sister of Ismir. She fell in love with Memphis, who seemed to also be interested in her. Isis imprisoned and killed her by jealousy.
- Mula (ムーラ, Mūra): the nanny of prince Ismir. She has a close relationship with the prince and seems to love him as her own son.
- Gidantash (ジダンタシュ, Jidantashu): Ismir's cousin.
- Uria (ウリア, Uria): the princess and older sister of the King. She is Gidantash's mother.
- Mira (ミラ, Mira): the fiancée of prince Ismir.
- General Hasas (ハザズ将軍, Hazazu-shōgun): a military leader of the Hittites.

===== Empire of Assyria =====
- Algon (アルゴン, Arugon)

Voiced by Seizō Katō
The sly emperor of Assyria who is known to use dirty tactics and lowly tricks. He longs for Carol, the Daughter of the Nile river, who is well known for her beauty, intelligence and her position as the future queen of Egypt. Aside from wanting Carol for her beauty and intelligence, he plans to use her to conquer Egypt.

- Jamali (ジャマリ, Jamari): Algon's favorite concubine. She travels to Egypt and follows her emperor's order to seduce Memphis.
- Shar (シャル, Sharu): the younger brother of emperor Algon.

===== Empire of Babylonia =====
- Ragash (ラガシュ, Ragashu): the emperor of Babylonia. He proposed to Isis and made her his bride with the condition "Kill Carol". Ragashu breaks his promise to Isis and instead of killing Carol, he imprisons her in the Tower of Babel.
- Omri (オムリ, Omuri): the confident of emperor Ragash.
- High Priest Rimusin (リムシン大神官, Rimushin-daishinkan): an official and the high priest of Babylonia.
- Garuz (ガルズ, Garuzu): the son of high priest Rimusin.

===== Kingdom of Minoa =====
- Minos (ミノス, Minosu): the king of Minoa. He has a weak health before Carol goes to Minoa and makes him healthier. Minos then falls in love with Carol. He is possibly named after Minos, the king of Crete from Greek Mythology.
- Atlas (アトラス, Atorasu): the prince of Minoa and elder brother of Minos. Because of his strange appearance, his mother hid him in a deep cave of the Empire. She usually visits him and tells him what happens in the Empire. His name and appearance are based on the Greek Titan Atlas and the ox-like creature Minotaurus.
- Queen Dowager (王太后, Ōdaikō): the mother of king Minos and Atlas. She is also the bright regent who helps her son rule over Minoa.
- Iouktas (ユクタス, Yukutasu): the general of Minoa. A powerful warrior.
- Photia (フォティア, Fotia): daughter of an official. She is one of the royal handmaidens in Minos' palace.
- Morione (モリオネー, Morione): a noble lady from Athens who became a handmaiden to the Minoans.
- Kirke (キルケー, Kirukē): a witch who helps Prince Ismir take princess Carol into his custody. Her name and character are loosely based on Circe from Greek mythology.

===== Other factions =====
The Amazones

- Queen of the Amazones (アマゾネスの女王, Amazonesu no Joō): the beautiful queen of the Amazones. She adores Carol. She kidnaps prince Ismir to save her sister, whose life in turn is saved by Carol.
- Hulia (ヒューリア, Hyūria): sister of the queen.

Kingdom of Libya

- King of Libya (リビアの王様, Ribia no Ō): father of princess Kafra.
- Kafra (カーフラ, Kāfura): the princess of Libya. She fell for Memphis and set many traps to eliminate Carol. She is proud of her dark-skinned and plump-faced beauty.

Empire of the Abyssinians

- Massharhiqhi (マシャリキ, Mashariki): the blue prince of the empire. He was imprisoned by Memphis's soldier and punished heavily by Memphis by mistake.
- Eirene (エレニー, Ereni): the maid serving prince Massharhiqhi.

Media Kingdom

- Arshama (アルシャマ, Arushama): The King of Media. He hid his true identity to know more about the Egyptian palace's situation. He gave Carol a rare Chinese silk.

Kingdom of Indus

- Sindhu (シンドゥ, Shindu): prince of the Ancient Indus.

== Media ==
=== Manga ===
The series has been serialised in Akita Shoten's Princess magazine since 1976. In September 2020, the series went on a hiatus, resuming on December 6. On August 3, 2023, the series took a 4-month hiatus, resuming on December 6.

In Thailand, Vibulkij has licensed the series.

In South Korea, RH Korea is publishing the series, however, it was originally pirated into the country in the 1990s under the title "Ramses, Son of the Sun" (태양의 아들 람세스).

| No. | Japanese release date | Japanese ISBN |
|---|---|---|
| 1 | 24 January 1977 | 4-253-07060-4 |
| 2 | 27 September 1977 | 4-253-07061-2 |
| 3 | 9 March 1978 | 4-253-07062-0 |
| 4 | 25 May 1978 | 4-253-07063-9 |
| 5 | 5 October 1979 | 4-253-07064-7 |
| 6 | 13 June 1980 | 4-253-07065-5 |
| 7 | 21 February 1981 | 4-253-07066-3 |
| 8 | 16 July 1981 | 4-253-07067-1 |
| 9 | 4 November 1981 | 4-253-07068-X |
| 10 | 4 September 1982 | 4-253-07069-8 |
| 11 | 10 December 1982 | 4-253-07070-1 |
| 12 | 26 July 1983 | 4-253-07071-X |
| 13 | 26 July 1984 | 4-253-07072-8 |
| 14 | 3 June 1985 | 4-253-07073-6 |
| 15 | 2 September 1985 | 4-253-07074-4 |
| 16 | 2 December 1985 | 4-253-07075-2 |
| 17 | 2 May 1986 | 4-253-07076-0 |
| 18 | 13 November 1986 | 4-253-07077-9 |
| 19 | 2 July 1987 | 4-253-07078-7 |
| 20 | 30 October 1987 | 4-253-07079-5 |
| 21 | 3 March 1988 | 4-253-07080-9 |
| 22 | 22 August 1988 | 4-253-07081-7 |
| 23 | 20 March 1989 | 4-253-07082-5 |
| 24 | 7 September 1989 | 4-253-07083-3 |
| 25 | 28 April 1990 | 4-253-07084-1 |
| 26 | 26 October 1990 | 4-253-07085-X |
| 27 | 28 March 1991 | 4-253-07590-8 |
| 28 | 25 October 1991 | 4-253-07591-6 |
| 29 | 2 April 1992 | 4-253-07592-4 |
| 30 | 23 October 1992 | 4-253-07593-2 |
| 31 | 23 April 1993 | 4-253-07594-0 |
| 32 | 18 November 1993 | 4-253-07595-9 |
| 33 | 28 April 1994 | 4-253-07596-7 |
| 34 | 31 March 1995 | 4-253-07597-5 |
| 35 | 24 November 1995 | 4-253-07598-3 |
| 36 | 31 May 1996 | 4-253-07599-1 |
| 37 | 24 April 1997 | 4-253-07600-9 |
| 38 | 19 December 1997 | 4-253-07613-0 |
| 39 | 26 June 1998 | 4-253-07614-9 |
| 40 | 21 December 1998 | 4-253-07615-7 |
| 41 | 25 June 1999 | 4-253-07797-8 |
| 42 | 16 December 1999 | 4-253-07798-6 |
| 43 | 22 June 2000 | 4-253-07799-4 |
| 44 | 22 February 2001 | 4-253-07800-1 |
| 45 | 28 June 2001 | 4-253-19111-8 |
| 46 | 24 December 2001 | 4-253-19112-6 |
| 47 | 18 July 2002 | 4-253-19113-4 |
| 48 | 21 August 2003 | 4-253-19114-2 |
| 49 | 9 September 2004 | 4-253-19115-0 |
| 50 | 16 August 2005 | 4-253-19116-9 |
| 51 | 16 June 2006 | 4-253-19117-7 |
| 52 | 13 July 2007 | 978-4-253-19118-0 |
| 53 | 16 June 2008 | 978-4-253-19119-7 |
| 54 | 16 June 2009 | 978-4-253-19120-3 |
| 55 | 16 June 2010 | 978-4-253-19121-0 |
| 56 | 16 August 2011 | 978-4-253-19122-7 |
| 57 | 15 June 2012 | 978-4-253-19132-6 |
| 58 | 14 June 2013 | 978-4-253-19133-3 |
| 59 | 16 July 2014 | 978-4-253-19158-6 |
| 60 | 16 July 2015 | 978-4-253-19159-3 |
| 61 | 16 June 2016 | 978-4-253-19160-9 |
| 62 | 16 December 2016 | 978-4-253-27352-7 |
| 63 | 16 April 2018 | 978-4-253-27353-4 |
| 64 | 15 June 2018 | 978-4-253-27354-1 |
| 65 | 14 June 2019 | 978-4-253-27355-8 |
| 66 | 16 June 2020 | 978-4-253-27356-5 |
| 67 | 16 June 2021 | 978-4-253-27357-2 |
| 68 | 16 June 2022 | 978-4-253-27358-9 |
| 69 | 15 June 2023 | 978-4-253-27359-6 |
| 70 | 14 June 2024 | 978-4-253-27360-2 |
| 71 | 16 June 2026 | 978-4-253-01383-3 |

=== OVA ===
Titled Royal Crest Illustrations, Story, and Video Color 40 minutes (王家の紋章 イラスト・ストーリー・ビデオ カラー40分), it was originally released in June 1988, and re-released on VHS 8 March 1996 Toei.

=== Stage musical ===
In 2016, the musical The Crest of the Royal Family was performed for the first time, adapting the story up through volume 4 of the manga. The music was composed by Sylvester Levay and the production was directed by Koichi Ogita. The premiere took place from 5 to 27 August 2016 at the Imperial Theatre in Tokyo, with preview performances on 3 and 4 August. A second run was held from 8 April to 7 May 2017 at the Imperial Theatre in Tokyo, and from 13 to 31 May 2017 at the Umeda Arts Theater Main Hall in Osaka. A third run followed from 5 to 28 August 2021 at the Imperial Theatre in Tokyo, and from 4 to 26 September 2021 at the Hakataza Theater in Fukuoka.

The role of Memphis was played by Kenji Urai in the first, second, and third runs (double-cast only in the third) and by Naoto Kaihō in the third run (double cast). Carol was portrayed by Sae Miyazawa and Seiko Niizuma in the first and second runs (double cast) and by Sayaka Kanda and Haruka Kinoshita in the third run (double cast). Izmir was portrayed by Mamoru Miyano and Motoki Square in the first and second runs (double cast) and by Motoki Square and Yusuke Ōnuki in the third run (double cast). Ryan was played by Kanata Irei in the first and second runs and by Takuya Uehara in the third run. Luca was played by Yūsuke Yada in the first and second runs and by Takahisa Maeyamaand Kuru Okanomiya in the third run (double cast). Unas was portrayed by Shinichirō Kogure in the first and second runs and by Yūta Ōsumi and Takehisa Maeyama in the third run (double cast). Mitamun was portrayed by Ayu Aika in the first and second runs and by Airi Kisaki in the third run. Naftela was played by Aya Izumo in all three runs. Isis was played by Megumi Hamada in the first and second runs and by Manato Asaka and Seiko Niizuma in the third run (double cast). Imhotep was portrayed by Yuichiro Yamaguchi in all three runs. Minue was played by Tatsuya Kawaguchi in the first run and by Tsuyoshi Matsubara in both the second and third runs. Finally, Seti was portrayed by Hiromu Kudō in the first and second runs and by Wakuto Sakaguchi in the third run. A stage musical adaptation, titled Musical: Crest of the Royal Family, took place in Japan in August 2021.

== Influence ==
=== In Vietnam ===
In May 2024, Kim Đồng Publishing House announced the plan to publish a remastered version of Ōke no Monshō under the name "Dấu ấn hoàng gia". Originally published in Vietnam from 1990 to 2000 as "Nữ hoàng Ai Cập" (The Egyptian Queen), it was a childhood nostalgia for many Vietnamese. However, Kim Đồng was forced to delay the publication due to an inappropriate post made by their cover designer. The result was the change of artist used by Kim Đồng and an apology from the designer.

== See also ==
- Daughter of the Nile, a Taiwanese film directed by Hou Hsiao-hsien, the title is a reference to the manga series.
