= Akogare =

Japanese manga and television series

あこがれ
- Genre: Romance, slice of life
- Manga
- Written by: Chieko Hosokawa
- Published by: Kodansha
- Magazine: Bessatsu Friend
- Original run: May 12, 1970 – August 8, 1970
- Volumes: 5
- Television drama

Hanayomeishō wa Dare ga Kiru
- Original network: Fuji Television
- Original run: April 23, 1986 – October 15, 1986
- Episodes: 24

Akogare (Japanese: あこがれ; "Longing") is a Japanese slice of life romance shōjo manga series written and illustrated by Chieko Hosokawa. It was serialized in Kodansha's Bessatsu Friend manga magazine and a total of five volumes were published. A 24-episode live action television drama series adaptation, Hanayomeishō wa Dare ga Kiru (花嫁衣裳は誰が着る), was broadcast on Fuji Television from April 23 to October 15, 1986.

== Volumes ==
- 1 (May 12, 1970)
- 2 (May 25, 1970)
- 3 (July 12, 1970)
- 4 (August 8, 1970)
- 5 (August 8, 1970)
