= Chieko Hosokawa =

Japanese manga artist

- Born: January 1, 1935 (age 91) Osaka, Japan
- Areas: Manga artist and writer

Chieko Hosokawa (細川 智栄子 (formerly 細川 知栄子), Hosokawa Chieko; born January 1, 1935 in Osaka, Japan) is a Japanese manga artist. She made her professional debut in 1958 with Crimson Rose (くれないのバラ, Kurenai no Bara). Her series Crest of the Royal Family, which received the 1991 Shogakukan Manga Award for shōjo, has been continuously serialized in Princess since 1976.

Her series Akogare was adapted into a TV drama series, titled Hanayomeishō wa Dare ga Kiru (花嫁衣裳は誰が着る), in 1986. Another series, Attention Please, was adapted from a 1970 TV drama series produced for Japan Airlines. A newer version of the TV drama was produced in 2006.

== Works ==
- Akogare (5 volumes)
- Attention Please (2 volumes)
- Cinderella no Mori (3 volumes)
- Crest of the Royal Family (70 volumes)
- Hakushaku Reijō (12 volumes)
- Kuroi Bishō (4 volumes)
- Maboroshi no Hanayome (1 volume)
- Nakuna Parikko
