= Nagi Noda =

Japanese artist (1973–2008)

Nagi Noda (野田 凪, Noda Nagi, November 18, 1973 – September 7, 2008) was a Japanese pop artist and art director born in Tokyo.

Noda spent much of her career working as a freelance art director. She directed multiple campaigns for brands such as Nike, Laforet, and Panasonic. In addition to her commercial works, she also was a prolific artist, taking on various solo projects. Such projects include: her half-panda sculptures, Hanpanda; a collaboration clothing brand with American artist Mark Ryden, Broken Label; and her unique hair hats. She held multiple solo exhibits throughout her career, and a post-humous exhibit was held to commemorate her work in 2011, a testament to her legacy and reputation as a designer. Noda's works are defined by artificiality and surreality, balancing between visual art and commercial relations with a high degree of creativity and non-conformity in their aesthetic and narration. She founded the design firm "Uchuu Country," where Japanese art director Yuni Yoshida also worked until starting her own agency in 2007.

Noda began her career directing advertising campaigns for Harajuku's Laforet shopping mall. Among her most well-known advertising works are the short film Mariko Takahashi's Fitness Video for Being Appraised as an "Ex-fat Girl", the half-panda-half-something-else Hanpanda life-sized figures, and the video for Japanese singer Yuki's song "Sentimental Journey". She paired up with Yuki again in 2005 to direct the opening song for the anime Honey & Clover, which was her only participation in a standard narrative work. Other works include a television advertisement for Coca-Cola (with music by Jack White), a collaboration with Medicom Toy to produce original Nagi Noda Be@rbricks, a video for the Scissor Sisters song "She's My Man", and the video for "Hearts On Fire" by Cut Copy, which was the last music video she made.

Per her biography in Women in Graphic Design, "The Works of Nagi Noda often make a disconcerting impression, with an aesthetic ranging from surreal to bizarre to poetic." Noda cited her unusual upbringing as having a large influence on her work. In a 2003 interview, she recalled how her parents would take her to look for UFOs or make her watch TV in black and white so she could learn to imagine color.

Noda died on September 7, 2008, at age 34, after surgical complications from injuries sustained in a traffic accident the previous year.
