= Land of a Thousand Words =

Single by Scissor Sisters

from the album Ta-Dah
- B-side: "Hair Baby"
- Released: December 4, 2006
- Genre: Pop rock, power ballad, soft rock
- Length: 3:50
- Label: Polydor
- Songwriter(s): Jason Sellards, Scott Hoffman
- Producer(s): Scissor Sisters

Scissor Sisters singles chronology
| "I Don't Feel Like Dancin'" (2006) | "Land of a Thousand Words" (2006) | "She's My Man" (2007) |

Music video
- "Land of a Thousand Words" on YouTube

"Land of a Thousand Words" is the second single from the American band, the Scissor Sisters' second album, Ta-Dah. It is the fifth track of Ta-Dah, and it was released on 4 December 2006 in the UK and Ireland. The single was released and charted in various European countries including Germany, Austria, Italy, Poland, Norway and the Czech Republic.

Unlike the first release off the album "I Don't Feel Like Dancin'", "Land of a Thousand Words" is a slow ballad track. The video for the song, directed by Brumby Boylston and Chris Dooley of National Television, is a homage to the James Bond film title sequences (in the style of Robert Brownjohn and Maurice Binder), featuring all of the band, and the credits for the music video itself.

== Track listing ==
=== 10-inch vinyl square picture disc ===
1. "Land of a Thousand Words" – 3:50

=== UK CD single ===
1. "Land of a Thousand Words" – 3:50
2. "Land of a Thousand Words" (Junkie XL remix) – 5:17

=== International CD single ===
1. "Land of a Thousand Words" – 3:50
2. "Hair Baby" – 4:06
3. "Land of a Thousand Words" (Junkie XL remix) – 5:17
4. "Land of a Thousand Words" (music video)

=== UK iTunes digital single ===
1. "Land of a Thousand Words" – 3:50
2. "Land of a Thousand Words" (Sébastien Tellier's Run to the Sun Mix) – 3:57

== Official remixes ==
1. "Land of a Thousand Words" (Junkie XL remix)
2. "Land of a Thousand Words" (Junkie XL remix edit)
3. "Land of a Thousand Words" (Sebastien Tellier's Run to the Sun Mix)

== Charts ==
| Chart (2006) | Peak position |
|---|---|
| Austria (Ö3 Austria Top 40) | 40 |
| Belgium (Ultratip Bubbling Under Flanders) | 4 |
| Belgium (Ultratip Bubbling Under Wallonia) | 15 |
| Czech Republic (ČNS IFPI) | 55 |
| Europe (IFPI) | 69 |
| Germany (GfK) | 50 |
| Ireland (IRMA) | 44 |
| Italy (FIMI) | 18 |
| Netherlands (Dutch Top 40 Tipparade) | 5 |
| Netherlands (Single Top 100) | 60 |
| Norway (VG-lista) | 18 |
| Poland (ZPAV) | 69 |
| Scotland (OCC) | 9 |
| UK Singles (OCC) | 19 |
