= Kiss You Off =

Single by Scissor Sisters

from the album Ta-Dah
- B-side: "Making Ladies", "Bad Shit" (demo)
- Released: 28 May 2007 (UK)
- Genre: Electroclash
- Length: 5:02 (Album Version); 3:43 (Radio Edit)
- Label: Polydor
- Songwriter(s): Hoffman, Sellards, Ana Lynch
- Producer(s): Scissor Sisters

Scissor Sisters singles chronology
"She's My Man" (2007)	"Kiss You Off" (2007)	"Fire with Fire" (2010)

Music video
- "Kiss You Off" on YouTube

"Kiss You Off" is the fourth and final radio-released single from the Scissor Sisters' second studio album, Ta-Dah. Plans for a fifth radio-released single from Ta-Dah had been cancelled due to poor charting positions on prior single releases. The single was followed by the limited edition "fan-only" release of "Lights".

The single was released in the UK on 28 May 2007. It entered the UK Singles Chart at #43. The official release sticker on the back of the promo CD sent to radio stations had this to say:

2007 Release of a Single that is a Change in Style for Scissor Sisters as Ana Matronic Takes Care of the Lead Vocals on a Song that Draws from the New Wave Scene of the Early 80s and is the Ultimate Break-up Song. "It's not a love song, it's a falling-out-of-love song," she laughs. "It's about knowing you're better than how you're being treated in a relationship and getting the fuck out... and then telling him to kiss your ass!" Includes a Backing Remix by Mr. Oizo!

The video is set in a futuristic beauty salon and was directed by Robert Hales.

== Track listings ==
=== 10" vinyl square picture disc ===
1. "Kiss You Off" (album version) – 5:02

=== UK CD single ===
1. "Kiss You Off" (album version) – 5:02
2. "Kiss You Off" (Mr. Oizo remix) – 4:20

=== International CD single ===
1. "Kiss You Off" (album version) – 5:02
2. "Making Ladies" – 4:39
3. "Kiss You Off" (Mr. Oizo remix) – 4:20
4. "Kiss You Off" (music video)

=== UK iTunes digital single ===
1. "Kiss You Off" (album version) – 5:02
2. "Bad Shit" (demo) – 2:28
3. "Kiss You Off" (Mr. Oizo remix) – 4:20

=== Australian iTunes digital EP ===
1. "Kiss You Off" – 5:03
2. "Kiss You Off" (Mr. Oizo remix) – 4:17
3. "Making Ladies" – 4:42

== Versions ==
1. "Kiss You Off" (album version) – 5:02
2. "Kiss You Off" (radio edit) – 3:43
3. "Kiss You Off" (Mr. Oizo remix) – 4:20

== Charts ==
Chart (2007)	Peak position
UK Singles (OCC)	43
