= Ta-Dah =

Studio album by Scissor Sisters
- Released: September 15, 2006
- Recorded: 2005–2006
- Genres: Glam rock; pop rock
- Length: 47:24
- Labels: Polydor (UK); Universal Motown (US)
- Producer: Scissor Sisters

Scissor Sisters chronology
Scissor Sisters (2004)	Ta-Dah (2006)	K-Mart Disco (2007)

Singles from Ta-Dah
- 1. "I Don't Feel Like Dancin'" Released: August 14, 2006; 2. "Land of a Thousand Words" Released: December 4, 2006; 3. "She's My Man" Released: March 5, 2007; 4. "Kiss You Off" Released: May 28, 2007

Ta-Dah is the second studio album by American alternative band Scissor Sisters, released on September 15, 2006. It was produced by the band and includes collaborations with Elton John, Carlos Alomar, and Paul Williams. The album debuted at number 19 on the US Billboard 200 chart, selling 42,000 copies in its first week. Upon its release, Ta-Dah received positive reviews from most music critics. The album was preceded by the single "I Don't Feel Like Dancin'", which reached number one on the UK Singles charts.

== Release and promotion ==
The album's release in the United Kingdom, on September 18, 2006, was preceded by the release of the single, "I Don't Feel Like Dancin'". The song reached number one on the UK Singles charts in late September and early October 2006.

"Land of a Thousand Words" was released as the second single from the album, peaking at number 19 in the UK in December 2006. "She's My Man" was the third single released in early March 2007 and managed to chart at number 29. The next single that was released was "Kiss You Off" on May 28. This was the poorest charting of the singles of Ta-Dah, though "I Can't Decide" charted at number 64 on downloads alone, garnering attention through its use in the Doctor Who episode "Last of the Time Lords."

== Reception ==
Professional ratings
Review scores
Source	Rating
AllMusic	3.5/5 stars
Entertainment Weekly	A−
The Guardian	4/5 stars
Los Angeles Times	3/4 stars
Pitchfork	7.3/10
Rolling Stone	3/5 stars
Slant Magazine	4.5/5 stars
Spin	8/10
Stylus Magazine	C
Yahoo! Music UK	9/10 stars

The album entered the Irish Albums Chart at number one on September 21, followed three days later by a number one entry in the UK Albums Chart. In the United States, it debuted at number 19 on the Billboard 200, with first-week sales of 42,000 copies. As of May 2010 it has sold 181,000 copies in United States.

Ta-Dah received positive reviews from most music critics. At Metacritic, which assigns a normalized rating out of 100 to reviews from mainstream critics, the album received an average score of 71, based on 30 reviews, which indicates "generally favorable reviews".

NME gave the album a score of six out of ten and said, "Scissor Sisters sound under so much pressure to follow up a monster hit that they're not actually having any fun." Similarly, Paste gave it a score of six out of ten and said that the songs "tend to dull the excitement." Tiny Mix Tapes gave it three-and-a-half out of five stars and said, "So what if Scissor Sisters aren't challenging the conventions of pop music?... [Ta-Dah is] great and will please their fans." musicOMH gave it four out of five stars and said, "There's a darker lyrical side to the album at once incongruous and ingenious when placed in such celebratory music."

However, some reviews varied from mixed to negative. PopMatters gave the album five stars out of ten and said, "Despite its title, Ta-Dah offers few surprises." Now gave it two stars out of five and said, "Somehow, Ta-Dah feels like the Sisters covering themselves, and the glitter and gloss have worn off." In his Consumer Guide, Robert Christgau gave it a "dud" rating, indicating that it was "a bad record whose details rarely merit further thought."

== Track listing ==
Ta-Dah track listing
No.	Title	Writer(s)	Producer(s)	Length
1.	"I Don't Feel Like Dancin'"	Scott Hoffman, Jason Sellards, Elton John	Scissor Sisters	4:48
2.	"She's My Man"	Hoffman, Sellards	Scissor Sisters	5:31
3.	"I Can't Decide"	Hoffman, Sellards	Scissor Sisters	2:46
4.	"Lights"	Hoffman, Sellards, Carlos Alomar	Scissor Sisters	3:35
5.	"Land of a Thousand Words"	Hoffman, Sellards	Scissor Sisters	3:50
6.	"Intermission"	Hoffman, Sellards, John	Scissor Sisters	2:37
7.	"Kiss You Off"	Hoffman, Sellards, Ana Lynch	Scissor Sisters	5:02
8.	"Ooh"	Hoffman, Sellards, Derek Gruen	Scissor Sisters	3:29
9.	"Paul McCartney"	Hoffman, Sellards, Gruen, Alomar	Scissor Sisters	3:44
10.	"The Other Side"	Hoffman, Sellards, John "JJ" Garden	Scissor Sisters	4:22
11.	"Might Tell You Tonight"	Hoffman, Sellards	Scissor Sisters	3:20
12.	"Everybody Wants the Same Thing"	Hoffman, Sellards, Patrick Seacor, Paul Leschen, Lynch	Scissor Sisters	4:22

UK bonus track
No.	Title	Writer(s)	Producer(s)	Length
13.	"Transistor"	Hoffman, Sellards	Scissor Sisters	4:51

Japan additional bonus track
No.	Title	Writer(s)	Producer(s)	Length
14.	"Ambition"	Hoffman, Sellards	Scissor Sisters	4:42

- The UK edition of the album has a pregap, consisting of two minutes of silence after "Everybody Wants the Same Thing". Subsequently, what seems to be the sound of an elevator reaching its destination floor is heard as an 8-second interlude at the end of the pregap. "Transistor" then begins.

=== Deluxe edition bonus disc ===
1. "Hair Baby" (Hoffman/Sellards/Gruen/Alomar) – 4:06
2. "Contact High (Demo)" (Hoffman/Sellards/Lynch) – 3:37
3. "Almost Sorry" (Hoffman/Sellards/Williams) – 3:15
4. "Transistor" (Hoffman/Sellards) – 4:51
5. "Making Ladies" (Hoffman/Sellards) – 4:39
6. "I Don't Feel Like Dancin'" (Paper Faces remix) (Hoffman/Sellards/John) – 6:34

== Personnel ==
Scissor Sisters

- Jake Shears – vocals
- Babydaddy – bass guitar, keyboards, vocals, guitar
- Ana Matronic – vocals
- Del Marquis – guitar, bass guitar
- Paddy Boom – drums, percussion

Additional musicians

- Elton John – piano on "I Don't Feel Like Dancin'" and "Intermission"
- J.J. Garden – additional piano on "She's My Man", piano on "I Can't Decide", "Land of a Thousand Words", "The Other Side" and "Everybody Wants the Same Thing"
- Gina Gershon – Jew's harp on "I Can't Decide"
- Carlos Alomar – additional guitar and bass on "Lights", "Paul McCartney" and "Hair Baby", additional guitar on "Transistor"
- Paul Leschen – piano on "Lights", "Ooh" and "Everybody Wants the Same Thing"
- Crispin Cioe – saxophone and horn arrangement on "Lights", "Paul McCartney" and "The Other Side"
- Bob Funk – trombone on "Lights", "Paul McCartney" and "The Other Side"
- Larry Etkin – trumpet on "Lights", "Paul McCartney", "The Other Side"
- Joan Wasser – string arrangement and violin on "Land of a Thousand Words"
- Jeff Hill – cello on "Land of a Thousand Words"
- Van Dyke Parks – string arrangement on "Intermission"
- Peter Kent – concert master on "Intermission"

== Charts ==
=== Weekly charts ===
Weekly chart performance for Ta-Dah
Chart (2006)	Peak position
Argentine Albums Chart	7
Australian Albums (ARIA)	1
Austrian Albums (Ö3 Austria)	3
Belgian Albums (Ultratop Flanders)	7
Belgian Albums (Ultratop Wallonia)	27
Danish Albums (Hitlisten)	6
Dutch Albums (Album Top 100)	11
Finnish Albums (Suomen virallinen lista)	14
French Albums (SNEP)	17
German Albums (Offizielle Top 100)	6
Hungarian Albums (MAHASZ)	39
Irish Albums (IRMA)	1
Italian Albums (FIMI)	7
New Zealand Albums (RMNZ)	11
Norwegian Albums (VG-lista)	2
Portuguese Albums (AFP)	15
Scottish Albums (Official Charts)	1
Spanish Albums (Promusicae)	21
Swedish Albums (Sverigetopplistan)	3
Swiss Albums (Schweizer Hitparade)	5
UK Albums (Official Charts)	1
US Billboard 200	19
US Top Dance Albums (Billboard)	1

=== Year-end charts ===
2006 year-end chart performance for Ta-Dah
Chart (2006)	Position
Australian Albums (ARIA)	35
Austrian Albums (Ö3 Austria)	60
Belgian Albums (Ultratop Flanders)	72
Dutch Albums (Album Top 100)	89
French Albums (SNEP)	150
German Albums (Offizielle Top 100)	75
Swedish Albums (Sverigetopplistan)	41
Swiss Albums (Schweizer Hitparade)	61
UK Albums (OCC)	3
US Top Dance/Electronic Albums (Billboard)	9

2007 year-end chart performance for Ta-Dah
Chart (2007)	Position
UK Albums (OCC)	60
US Top Dance/Electronic Albums (Billboard)	14

== Certifications and sales ==
Certifications and sales for Ta-Dah
Region	Certification	Certified units/sales
Australia (ARIA)	Platinum	70,000^{^}
Austria (IFPI Austria)	Platinum	30,000^{*}
Belgium (BRMA)	Gold	25,000^{*}
Canada (Music Canada)	Gold	50,000^{^}
Denmark (IFPI Danmark)	Platinum	40,000^{^}
Germany (BVMI)	Gold	100,000^{^}
Ireland (IRMA)	2× Platinum	30,000^{^}
Russia (NFPF)	Platinum	20,000^{*}
Sweden (GLF)	Gold	30,000^{^}
Switzerland (IFPI Switzerland)	Gold	15,000^{^}
United Kingdom (BPI)	5× Platinum	1,500,000^{‡}
Summaries
Europe (IFPI)	2× Platinum	2,000,000^{*}
^{*} Sales figures based on certification alone.^{^} Shipments figures based on certification alone.^{‡} Sales+streaming figures based on certification alone.

== Release history ==
Release history for Ta-Dah
Country	Date
Australia	September 16, 2006
United Kingdom	September 18, 2006
