= Paddy Boom =

American professional drummer (born 1968)

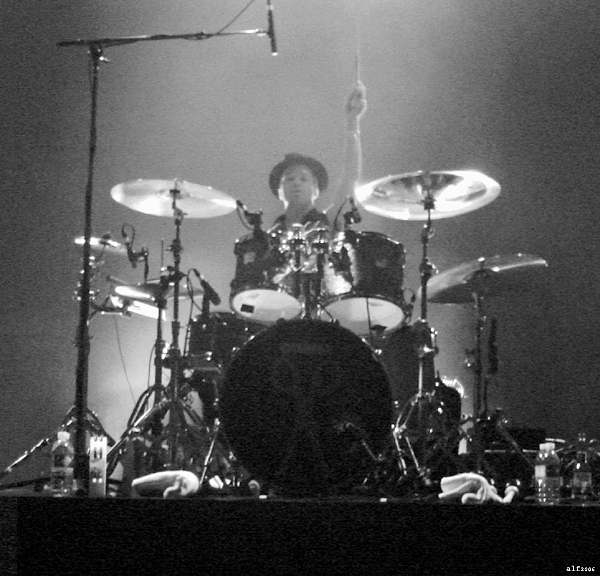
- Paddy Boom in concert at the Hammerstein Ballroom in October 2006.

Background information
- Born: Patrick Seacor; September 6, 1968 (age 57); Singapore
- Origin: New York City, New York
- Genres: Glam rock, alternative dance, pop
- Occupations: Musician, songwriter
- Instruments: Drums, electronic drums, percussion, vocals
- Years active: 1992–2008
- Formerly of: Scissor Sisters, Faith

Paddy Boom (born Patrick Seacor on September 6, 1968) is an American drummer and record store owner. He was the original drummer in the American glam rock band Scissor Sisters.

== Biography ==
Born in Singapore, as a teenager he taught himself to play drums, copying the style of U2's Larry Mullen Jr., using curtain rods fashioned into drumsticks on his sofa. He then progressed on to other drummers, and became a big fan of Stewart Copeland from The Police. Patrick attended the School of Visual Arts in Manhattan to study advertising, where he met Bryan Hynes and Robert Brochu. The three formed the Sloane Rangers, a seminal indie art-rock band that was a fixture in the New York rock scene for nearly a decade. TSR recorded two album 1990s "From The From" and 1992's "Scram", the latter produced by Mark Spencer, guitarist for Lisa Loeb, Freedy Johnston and Blood Oranges. The Sloane Rangers (TSR) recorded their two albums for Invert Records, an independent label that was founded by Stephen Struthers and Robert Sherman. Invert Records promoted a number of bands out of the NYC area, including Several Other Men and The Pleasantries.

After TSR, Boom drummed for many different bands in New York, and started a record label, Boom Boom Records. Through Boom Boom he published his band Faith, for whom he drummed and sang backing vocals. In 2001, Boom joined Scissor Sisters and played on their first two albums, 2004's Scissor Sisters and 2006's Ta-Dah. After an absence from the band's live lineup for 18 months, it was announced on 16 October 2008 that Paddy had amicably parted ways with the Scissor Sisters. Boom effectively retired following his departure from the band, and did not join the group in their 2024 reunion. As of 2025, Boom owns and runs Boom & Bloom Records in East Durham, New York.
