= I Don't Feel Like Dancin' =

2006 single by Scissor Sisters

Single by Scissor Sisters

from the album Ta-Dah
- B-side: "Ambition"
- Released: August 14, 2006
- Studio: Discoball Jazzfest (New York City)
- Genre: Pop, soft rock, post-disco
- Length: 4:48 (album version); 4:08 (radio edit)
- Label: Polydor; Universal Motown
- Songwriters: Elton John; Scott Hoffman; Jason Sellards
- Producer: Scissor Sisters

Scissor Sisters singles chronology
"Filthy/Gorgeous" (2005)	"I Don't Feel Like Dancin'" (2006)	"Land of a Thousand Words" (2006)

Music video
- "I Don't Feel Like Dancin'" on YouTube

"I Don't Feel Like Dancin'" is a song by American pop band Scissor Sisters. It was released in August 2006 as the first single from their second album, Ta-Dah (2006). The song was written by Jason Sellards, Scott Hoffman, and Elton John, with John providing the piano for the song. It was Scissor Sisters' first top-10 single in many countries, peaking at number one in nine of them.

== Content ==
The song's tempo, arrangement, use of falsetto vocals, and subject matter have been compared by reviewers in The Guardian and The Sun to Leo Sayer's 1976 hit "You Make Me Feel Like Dancing". The song also features a rhythm piano that makes reference to "December, 1963 (Oh, What a Night)" by The Four Seasons. The single's cover art features actress Veronica Cartwright.

== Music video ==
The video, a cinematographic melange, is staged as an animated bill poster for the band, located outside Phoenix Cinema in North London. As a young boy (Chester McKee, a contestant on I'd Do Anything) gazes into the poster, the camera zooms in and the poster fills the frame, suddenly animating into complex motion and dramatic scenes, before pulling out and the image returning to a still bill poster at the end.

The video was created using a combination of digital compositing techniques including stop/start technology and background/foreground illusions and was directed by Andy Soup of Independent Films, with producer Verity White and director of photography Alex Barber. Post production was by flame artist Ben Robards at Absolute Post, and editor Amanda James at Final.

== Track listings ==
UK CD1 and European CD single

1. "I Don't Feel Like Dancin'" – 4:48
2. "Ambition" – 4:39

UK CD2

1. "I Don't Feel Like Dancin'" – 4:48
2. "I Don't Feel Like Dancin'" (Linus Loves dub) – 5:54
3. "I Don't Feel Like Dancin'" (video)

UK 8-inch square picture disc and Japanese CD single

1. "I Don't Feel Like Dancin'" – 4:48
2. "I Don't Feel Like Dancin'" (Linus Loves vocal edit) – 4:02

Australian CD single

1. "I Don't Feel Like Dancin'" (album version) – 4:48
2. "Ambition" – 4:39
3. "I Don't Feel Like Dancin'" (Linus Loves vocal edit) – 4:02
4. "I Don't Feel Like Dancin'" (video)

== Charts ==
=== Weekly charts ===
Chart (2006–2007)	Peak position
Australia (ARIA)	1
Austria (Ö3 Austria Top 40)	1
Belgium (Ultratop 50 Flanders)	1
Belgium (Ultratop 50 Wallonia)	34
Canada Hot 100 (Billboard)	25
Canada AC (Billboard)	27
Canada CHR/Top 40 (Billboard)	14
Canada Hot AC (Billboard)	6
CIS Airplay (TopHit)	35
Croatia (HRT)	1
Czech Republic Airplay (ČNS IFPI)	7
Denmark (Tracklisten)	4
Europe (Eurochart Hot 100)	1
Finland (Suomen virallinen lista)	2
France (SNEP)	33
Germany (GfK)	1
Hungary (Rádiós Top 40)	3
Hungary (Dance Top 40)	37
Ireland (IRMA)	2
Italy (FIMI)	4
Lithuania (EHR)	1
Netherlands (Dutch Top 40)	2
Netherlands (Single Top 100)	2
New Zealand (Recorded Music NZ)	6
Norway (VG-lista)	1
Russia Airplay (TopHit)	31
Scottish Singles Sales (Official Charts)	1
Slovakia Airplay (ČNS IFPI)	2
Sweden (Sverigetopplistan)	1
Switzerland (Schweizer Hitparade)	1
UK Singles (Official Charts)	1
Ukraine Airplay (TopHit)	106
US Bubbling Under Hot 100 (Billboard)	2
US Adult Pop Airplay (Billboard)	35
US Dance Airplay (Billboard)	2

=== Year-end charts ===
Chart (2006)	Position
Australia (ARIA)	5
Austria (Ö3 Austria Top 40)	8
Belgium (Ultratop 50 Flanders)	14
Europe (Eurochart Hot 100)	4
Germany (Media Control GfK)	18
Hungary (Rádiós Top 40)	38
Ireland (IRMA)	13
Italy (FIMI)	45
Netherlands (Dutch Top 40)	11
Netherlands (Single Top 100)	20
Russia Airplay (TopHit)	196
Sweden (Hitlistan)	6
Switzerland (Schweizer Hitparade)	12
UK Singles (OCC)	4

Chart (2007)	Position
Australia (ARIA)	64
Austria (Ö3 Austria Top 40)	74
Belgium (Ultratop 50 Flanders)	90
Europe (Eurochart Hot 100)	49
Germany (Media Control GfK)	57
Netherlands (Single Top 100)	77
Switzerland (Schweizer Hitparade)	76
UK Singles (OCC)	96

=== Decade end charts ===
Chart (2000–2009)	Position
Australia (ARIA)	93
Germany (Media Control GfK)	66
UK Singles (OCC)	72

== Certifications ==
Region	Certification	Certified units/sales
Australia (ARIA)	Platinum	70,000^{^}
Belgium (BRMA)	Gold	25,000^{*}
Denmark (IFPI Danmark)	Platinum	8,000^{^}
Germany (BVMI)	Platinum	300,000^{‡}
Italy (FIMI)	Gold	50,000^{‡}
New Zealand (RMNZ)	Platinum	30,000^{‡}
Sweden (GLF)	Platinum	20,000^{^}
Switzerland (IFPI Switzerland)	Gold	15,000^{^}
United Kingdom (BPI)	2× Platinum	1,200,000^{‡}
^{*} Sales figures based on certification alone.^{^} Shipments figures based on certification alone.^{‡} Sales+streaming figures based on certification alone.

== Release history ==
Region	Date	Format(s)	Label(s)	Ref.
United States	August 14, 2006	Hot adult contemporary radio	Polydor; Universal Motown	
United Kingdom	September 4, 2006	CD	Polydor	
Australia	September 11, 2006	CD	Polydor	
Japan	September 20, 2006	CD	Polydor	
