= She's My Man =

2007 single by Scissor Sisters

Single by Scissor Sisters

from the album Ta-Dah
- B-side: "Transistor"
- Released: March 5, 2007
- Studio: Discoball Jazzfest (New York City)
- Length: 5:31 (album version); 4:03 (radio edit)
- Label: Polydor
- Songwriters: Babydaddy; Jake Shears
- Producer: Scissor Sisters

Scissor Sisters singles chronology
| "Land of a Thousand Words" (2006) | "She's My Man" (2007) | "Kiss You Off" (2007) |

Music video
- "She's My Man" on YouTube

"She's My Man" is a song by American pop rock band Scissor Sisters, released on March 5, 2007, as the third single from their second studio album, Ta-Dah (2006). "She's My Man" became another UK hit for the group, peaking at number 29 on the UK Singles Chart, and reached the top 20 in Finland and Norway. Lukas Ridgeston appears as the cover model on artwork for the single.

== Music video ==
The single's video was directed by Nagi Noda, and shot in Tokyo, Japan. It uses the Kuroko technique, where the band members act out a scene round a dining table against a black background. Stagehands (dressed completely in black, and effectively invisible) move props, furniture and bits of costume to surreal effect. Jake Shears and Babydaddy have said that there was only one visual effect in this video, but its whereabouts have not yet been confirmed.

== Track listings ==
UK and European CD single

1. "She's My Man" (album version) – 5:31
2. "She's My Man" (Goose remix edit) – 4:18

UK 8-inch square picture disc

1. "She's My Man" (album version) – 5:31

Australian CD single

1. "She's My Man" – 5:31
2. "Transistor" – 4:51
3. "She's My Man" (Goose remix edit) – 4:18
4. "She's My Man" (video)

== Charts ==
| Chart (2007) | Peak position |
|---|---|
| Australia (ARIA) | 39 |
| Austria (Ö3 Austria Top 40) | 55 |
| Belgium (Ultratip Bubbling Under Flanders) | 3 |
| Czech Republic (Rádio – Top 100) | 62 |
| Finland (Suomen virallinen lista) | 10 |
| Germany (GfK) | 57 |
| Italy (FIMI) | 23 |
| Netherlands (Dutch Top 40 Tipparade) | 6 |
| Netherlands (Single Top 100) | 94 |
| Norway (VG-lista) | 14 |
| Scotland Singles (OCC) | 15 |
| Slovakia (Rádio Top 100) | 36 |
| Sweden (Sverigetopplistan) | 39 |
| UK Singles (OCC) | 29 |
| Ukraine Airplay (TopHit) | 102 |

== Release history ==
| Region | Date | Format | Label | Ref. |
|---|---|---|---|---|
| Australia | March 5, 2007 | CD | Polydor | |
| United Kingdom | March 5, 2007 | CD | Polydor | |
