= Scissor Sisters =

American pop rock band

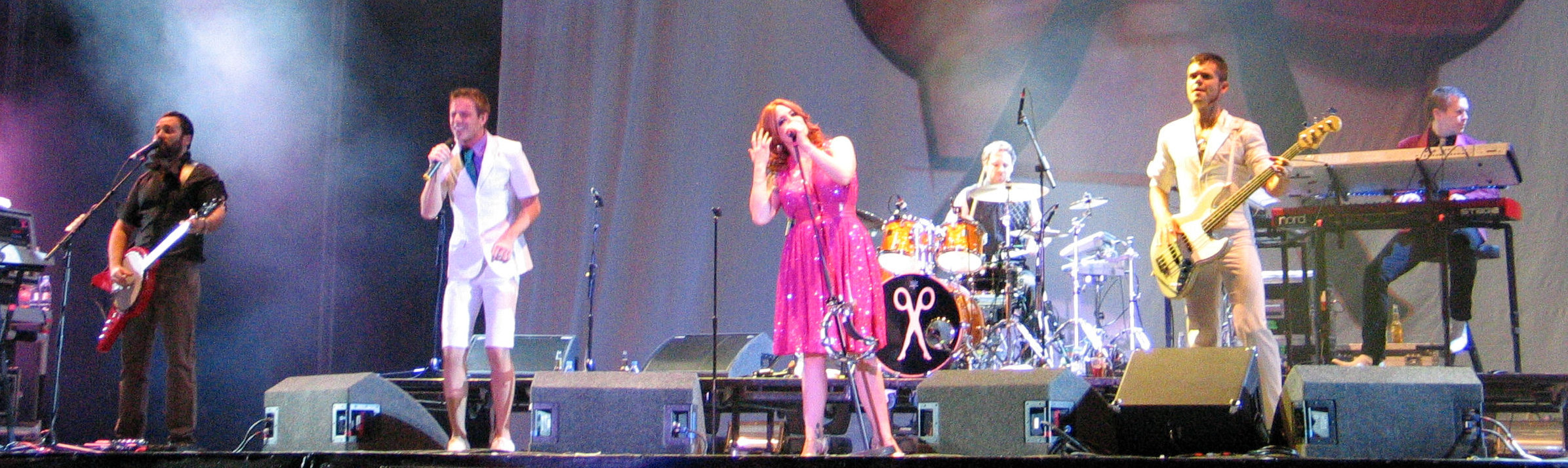
- Scissor Sisters at Super Bock Super Rock 2007 in Portugal

Background information
- Origin: New York City, U.S.
- Genres: Pop rock; pop; glam rock; nu-disco; electroclash
- Years active: 2000–2012; 2017; 2024–present
- Labels: Polydor; Universal; Jive; Motown; Casablanca
- Members: Jake Shears; Babydaddy; Del Marquis
- Past members: Paddy Boom; Ana Matronic
- Website: scissorsisters.com

Scissor Sisters are an American pop rock band formed in 2000. The band's current line-up consists of Jake Shears (vocals), Babydaddy (various instruments) and Del Marquis (guitar, bass). Former members include vocalist Ana Matronic and original drummer Paddy Boom. Scissor Sisters incorporate diverse styles in their music, but tend towards pop rock, glam rock, nu-disco, and electroclash. Forged in the "gay nightlife scene of New York", the band took its name from the female same-sex sexual activity of tribadism.

The band came to prominence following the release of their Grammy-nominated and chart-topping disco version of "Comfortably Numb" and subsequent debut album Scissor Sisters (2004). The album was a success, particularly in the UK where it reached number one, was the best-selling album of 2004, was later certified nine-times platinum by the BPI, and earned them three BRIT Awards in 2005. All five of its singles reached positions within the top 20 of the UK Singles Chart while "Filthy/Gorgeous" scored the band their first number one on Billboard's Hot Dance Club Songs, despite the album's limited success in their native US.

The album continued its success in countries around Europe, in Australia and in Canada before the release of the band's second studio album Ta-Dah (2006), their second consecutive UK number one album which produced their first UK number one single "I Don't Feel Like Dancin'". Their third studio album Night Work (2010) displayed a shift towards a more club-oriented sound, charting at number two on the UK Albums Chart, number one on Billboard's Top Independent Albums chart and in the top 10 of several international territories. The band released their fourth studio album Magic Hour in May 2012.

Scissor Sisters has performed around the world and have become recognized for their controversial and transgressive live performances. They also collaborated with a number of other well-known pop musicians, including Elton John and Kylie Minogue; these particular collaborations have been received positively by both critics and other notable figures. In 2004, Bono, lead vocalist of rock band U2, described Scissor Sisters as "the best pop group in the world". They also collaborated with Global Cool in 2007 on one of their green lifestyle campaigns.

== History ==
=== 2000–2003: Early career ===
Originally named Dead Lesbian and the Fibrillating Scissor Sisters, the final two words being derived from the lesbian sexual act of tribadism, the band was founded in 2000 after friends Jason "Jake Shears" Sellards and Scott "Babydaddy" Hoffman (who had met in 1999 in Lexington, Kentucky) both moved to New York City, enjoying its open and gay-friendly ethos. They began producing music together, with Babydaddy composing music and Shears writing lyrics. The duo released a couple of singles to little success and began appearing at underground clubs on New York's Lower East Side. On a trip to Disneyland, the pair met Ana "Matronic" Lynch at a screening of Michael Jackson's Captain EO. During a subsequent teacup ride, they discovered that they had a lot in common. Shears later remarked, "I really thought she was a freak but when I started singing "Another Part of Me" she showed me the best moonwalk I've ever seen."

Ana Matronic ran a weekly cabaret event known as Knock Off at a club called the Slipper Room in New York, where she liked to hire eccentric and alternative acts; one reporter described it as a place that "served up a racy, multigender revue of kitsch," and that a performer dressed as a giant vulva "enfolded me with her labia while singing "Lick Me in My Wet Spot" to the tune of "Hit Me With Your Best Shot"." Matronic invited the pair to appear at Knock Off, which they did on September 21, 2001. Shears dressed as his character "Jason the Amazing Back-Alley Late Term Abortion" whilst Matronic, dressed as a reject from Andy Warhol's Factory, joined the pair on stage and sang. Shears and Babydaddy felt she was very effective and asked her to join the band on a permanent basis, to which she agreed.

The trio then began appearing at other clubs, dropping the word "Fibrillating" from their name. They primarily played electroclash, which was popular at the time in the underground club scene of New York with bands like Peaches and Chicks on Speed. They were soon joined by Derek "Del Marquis" Gruen on lead guitar, who had known Shears from when they both worked at the IC Guys club where Shears had been a stripper. They were joined by a fifth member, Patrick "Paddy Boom" Seacor, on drums who (being heterosexual) felt the need to explain to his mother that "it's not a gay band... there [are] gay members, but it doesn't matter. It's about the music and about performance."

In 2002, the band signed with a small New York record company called A Touch of Class for a two-single deal. Their first single "Electrobix" dealt with gay men's obsessions with working out but proved to be less popular than its B-side, a cover version of Pink Floyd's progressive rock classic "Comfortably Numb". Matronic commented, "It's one of those songs that people were either gonna love or hate, and that's really, really powerful, because it basically means you're evoking a reaction in everyone. The first time I heard it, I thought that if it doesn't make us famous, it'll make us infamous because somebody will shoot us!" Their version of "Comfortably Numb" became a hit in many dance clubs and, after sending Pink Floyd themselves a copy, the Scissor Sisters received positive remarks from the song's original writers Roger Waters and David Gilmour. The song proved to be particularly popular in the UK, where various record labels soon took an interest in the band. In 2003, they decided they would tour Europe where they believed audiences would be more receptive to them and their music than their native US.

=== 2003–2004: Debut album and breakthrough success ===
"Comfortably Numb" came to the attention of British label Polydor, who signed the group to a contract. Their first single for the label "Laura" (with two different music videos) had a limited release in 2003 and reaching number 54 in the UK Singles Chart, receiving little attention with the exceptions of British music paper New Musical Express, Channel 4's entertainment programme V Graham Norton, and the same channel's music programme Popworld for which they were interviewed. The track also received much radio play in Australia. Their track "It Can't Come Quickly Enough" was also included on the soundtrack of the film Party Monster (2003), playing over its ending credits.

Their first hit was in 2004 with the official release of "Comfortably Numb". Reaching number 10 in the UK, this success was followed by "Take Your Mama" which went to number 17, a re-release of "Laura" (with two different music videos) which went to number 12, the ballad "Mary" which went to number 14, and the hedonist anthem "Filthy/Gorgeous" which peaked at number 5 in the UK. All the singles came from their debut album Scissor Sisters, which reached number one in the UK Albums Chart and became the best selling album of 2004, beating Keane's Hopes and Fears by 582 copies. As of 2018, it is the 20th biggest-selling album of the 21st century, and the 35th biggest-selling of all time in the UK.

Several media outlets noted that Scissor Sisters "stick out like a sore thumb" on the list of artists who have sold over 2 million copies of an album in the UK in the 21st century, the others being James Blunt, Robbie Williams, Keane, Dido, Coldplay and Norah Jones—artists considered "mainstream" compared to the Scissor Sisters' brash and controversial image. The band had been particularly keen on producing an album that fitted together well rather than simply producing a string of singles. According to Babydaddy, their purpose was "to create a perfect pop rock album that would pick you up at the beginning, take you on a journey in the middle, and set you right back down again in the same place at the end."

About six months after its British release, Scissor Sisters was released in the US. To publicize it the band appeared on the popular morning television show Live with Regis and Kelly, an event that Shears later recalled: "Kelly Ripa loved us, after the first time we played, she gave me a hug and whispered in my ear, 'I just want you to know that this is my favorite music performance we've ever had.' It was amazing." Nonetheless, neither the band nor the album proved to be a big commercial success in the US: major chain store Wal-Mart refused to stock it, claiming on its website that it contained "a snarling, swaggering attack on conservatism" in the form of the song "Tits on the Radio".

The band refused to produce a "clean" version of the album, and Babydaddy remarked that, "We did have to slap a parental warning sticker on the disc, which is completely absurd. I think a kid listening to Eminem is getting a much more negative message than what we've been putting forward. We've only got one 'shit' and a few 'tits!'" Band members have shown their dissatisfaction with the decision on a number of occasions. However, they continued their success in Europe by performing at the Brixton Academy in London for Halloween 2004, where they asked the audience to dress up as the characters from The Rocky Horror Show; the band themselves did so too.

=== 2005–2007: Ta-Dah ===
Recording of the second album, Ta-Dah, commenced in mid-May 2005 at the Discoball; sneak previews of new songs were played at live performances, including "Everybody Wants the Same Thing", performed at the Live 8 concert, "Paul McCartney", "I Can't Decide", "Hybrid Man", "Forever Right Now" and "Hair Baby" (a title that refers to the phenomenon of tumors containing partially formed fetuses). Among the assumed pseudonyms used to play a series of secret shows to test this new material were "Bridget Jones' Diarrhea", "Portion Control" and "Megapussi". Scissor Sisters were also one of the headlining acts at the British V Festival in 2005, where they collaborated on stage with Scottish rock group Franz Ferdinand to perform a cover version of David Bowie's "Suffragette City".

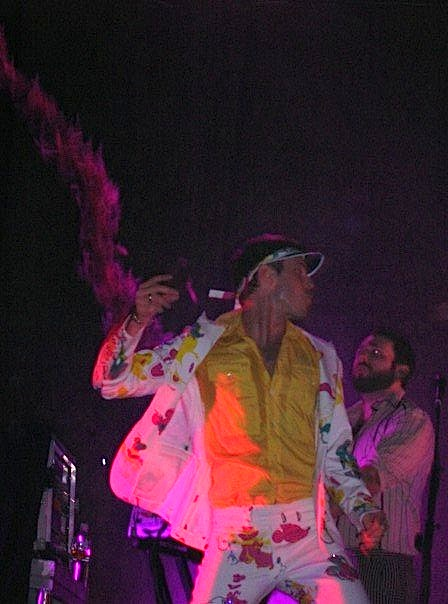
Jake Shears on tour in St. Louis, 2007

The band fulfilled one of its dreams: Elton John collaborated with them on "I Don't Feel Like Dancin'" (as pianist and co-writer). The song reached No. 1 in the United Kingdom on September 10, 2006, and remained in the top spot for four consecutive weeks. "I Don't Feel Like Dancin'" also peaked at No. 1 on the Australian ARIA Singles Chart and the Euro Hot 100. "I Don't Feel Like Dancin'" became the group's biggest hit to date.

Elton John also contributed to the song "Intermission" on Ta-Dah and played piano on a demo of the song Bad Shit (that can be found on the Lights CD single).

In 2006, they acted as an opening act for Depeche Mode's Touring the Angel Tour for a concert in Mountain View, California. Their first gig in the UK for promotion of the second album took place at the KOKO Club, Camden, London, on August 31, 2006, and was filmed for MTV. 2006 performances at the Bowery Ballroom and Siren Music Festival in New York and the Coachella Valley Music and Arts Festival allowed the band to showcase an array of songs from the new album. A free concert was given in Trafalgar Square to 10,000 ballot winners on September 16, 2006, to promote the Red charity. The band also headlined the 2006 Bestival festival on the Isle of Wight. Additionally, they were invited to BBC's Maida Vale studios to perform different songs on every show broadcast on BBC Radio 1. The event, dubbed "Scissor Sisters Day", culminated in them actually standing in for presenter Pete Tong and hosting his three-hour slot themselves. The show took an unexpected turn when a woman in labour telephoned the show to share her experience with the band and they played "Push It" by Salt-n-Pepa for her. Several performances, interviews, and a humorous jingle that was written in an hour, were filmed and edited into a special seven-day, looped broadcast on BBCi.

The album was released on September 18, 2006 in the United Kingdom, and on September 26, 2006, in the United States. According to Shears, the album is a combination of 1960s psychedelia, glam rock and disco. It reached No. 1 in the UK Albums Chart in its first week of release, officially taking the top spot on September 24, 2006, marking a first for the Scissor Sisters, consisting of a single and album at the top of the UK charts simultaneously. The album Ta-Dah leaked onto the Internet on September 10, 2006, five days before its release in the United Kingdom.

The Scissor Sisters ended their first UK tour at the Wembley Arena, London, from November 24 to 26, 2006, supported by new artist Lily Allen, who performed during the three days there. The band has also been in the Latin America Top 40 Airplay. "I Don't Feel Like Dancin'" is still charting and is so far their biggest hit to date in Latin America, reaching No. 23, charting mostly in South America, particularly Peru. "Land of a Thousand Words" was released as the second single from the album, peaking at No. 19 in the UK. "She's My Man" was the third single released in March 2007, peaking at No. 29. "Kiss You Off" was the fourth and final single released in May 2007 but failed to dent the Top 40, their first single since their debut Laura to do so. The "Kiss You Off" video centered around Ana Matronic in a futuristic beauty salon. The group was the main event during the New Year's Eve celebrations for 2007 in Berlin. On February 8 and 9, 2007, the group appeared on the American daytime soap opera Passions. They performed "I Don't Feel Like Dancin'" and "Land of a Thousand Words" from the album Ta-Dah.

=== 2008–2011: Night Work and other projects ===
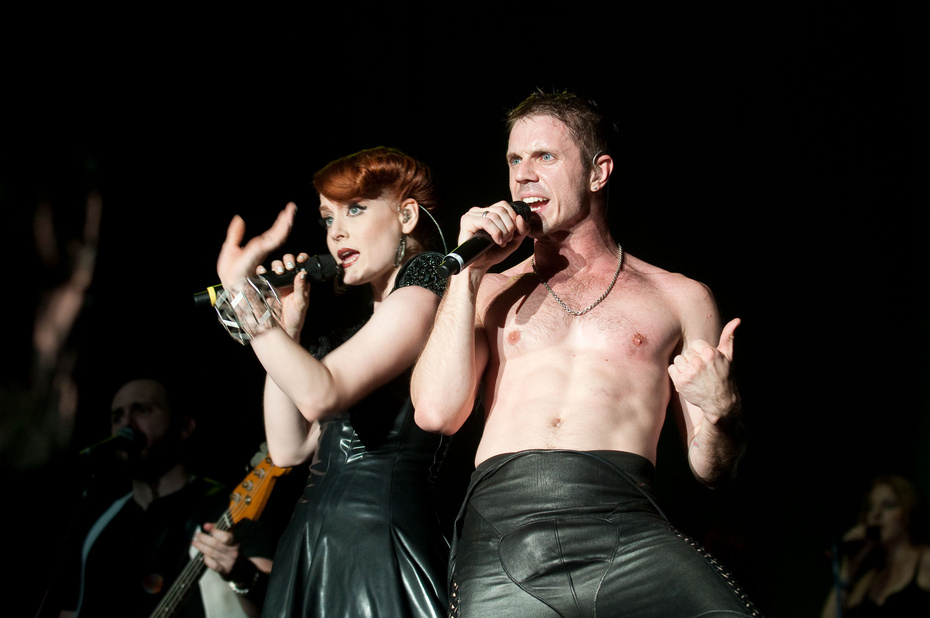
Jake Shears and Ana Matronic performing in 2010 at the Fuji Rock Festival, Japan

After touring the world in 2007, the band had a short hiatus in order to work on their next studio album. Premiering new material of this album at secret gigs in New York City's Mercury Lounge in October 2008, they assumed the names Queef Latina and Debbie's Hairy. New songs included on the set list were "Television", "Who's Your Money", "Other Girls", "Major for You", "None of My Business", "Singularity", "Do the Strand", "Who's There", "Not the Loving Kind", "Taking Shape" (with Babydaddy on lead vocals), and "Uroboros". Shears stated on the band's website there was a possibility that none of these songs would appear on the album, as the band was less than satisfied with most of them. This was confirmed to be the case when the track list was revealed. Drummer Paddy Boom was absent at these gigs and it was later announced that he had amicably parted from the band. The band had come into contact with drummer Randy "Real" Schrager, who was known from his work on the downtown New York scene, playing with bands such as Jessica Vale and The Act. He was initially brought on as a fill-in during Paddy Boom's leave of absence. Eventually, Randy was made part of the full-time line-up.

Scissor Sisters spent much of 2008 and early 2009 in the recording studio. However, after working on new material for approximately 18 months, the band decided to shelve their third album. Shears explained: "In my heart I knew it wasn't right. I didn't really know what it was trying to say. It left me a little bit cold." Reportedly, an entire record had been worked on but that the group had "shelved it about a year ago." Shears admits, "If it wasn't something we could fully get behind and believe in, I think the band was going to be over."

In June 2009, the band returned to the studio and began to work on new tracks that made it onto Night Work, their replacement third album. Produced in collaboration with Stuart Price, Night Work was released on June 28, 2010. The album was described as "supersexual and sleazy" with its first single, "Fire with Fire" as "a really epic song that makes you feel really good". With the album, the band have toured worldwide on The Night Work Tour. As an opening act, they joined Lady Gaga for select dates on her third leg of The Monster Ball Tour in early 2011.

Shears and Scissor Sisters collaborator John "JJ" Garden provided the lyrics and score for a world-premiere musical adaptation of Armistead Maupin's Tales of the City, a much-loved series of novels (and later a television miniseries) about life in San Francisco in the 1970s. The musical was first developed at the Eugene O'Neill Theater Center's National Music Theater Conference in 2009, where Shears and Garden collaborated with a creative team that included playwright Jeff Whitty and director Jason Moore, of the Tony-Award-winning musical Avenue Q. The show had a subsequent run in San Francisco on May 18, 2011 at the American Conservatory Theater.

=== 2012–2024: Magic Hour and indefinite hiatus ===
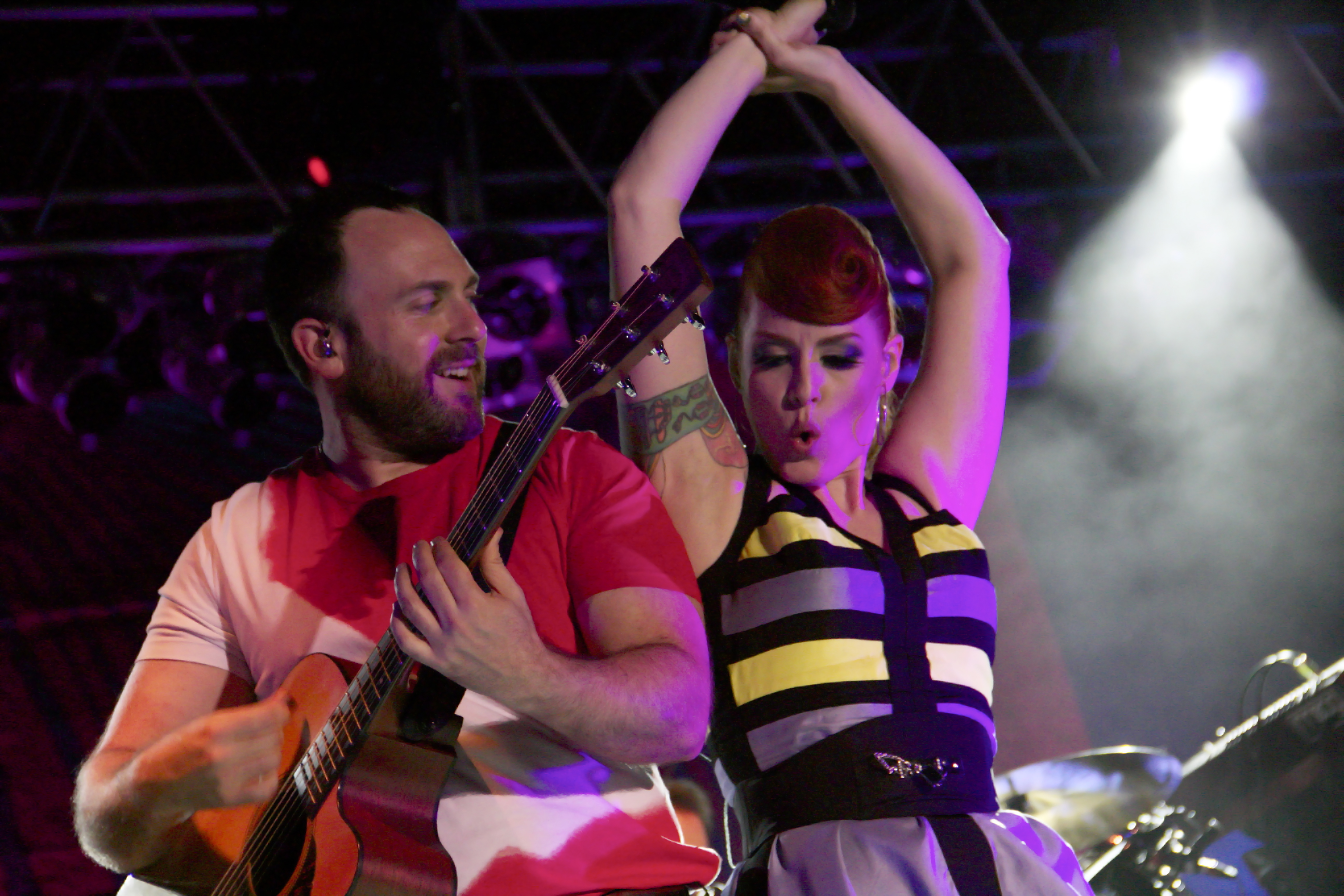
Babydaddy and Ana Matronic performing in Kansas City on the 2012 "Magic Hour" tour.

On October 31, 2011, Shears tweeted that the band's fourth album was in its final stages. A song from the new album titled "Shady Love" debuted on Annie Mac's BBC Radio 1 show on January 2, 2012. "Shady Love" features guest vocals from Azealia Banks while Jake Shears performs under his pseudonym Krystal Pepsy.

On March 13, 2012, Scissor Sisters announced the title of the album, Magic Hour, and revealed that the record would be released worldwide on May 28, 2012. The band also announced the release date of a new single, "Only the Horses". Originally scheduled to come out on May 20, the release of "Only the Horses" was brought forward to May 13. The video premiered on Thursday April 18, 2012. On May 7, the band released the track "Let's Have a Kiki" exclusively via Spotify in some countries.

Upon release, Magic Hour peaked at #4 on the UK Albums Chart and #35 on the US Billboard 200. The album reached #1 on Billboard's Dance/Electronic Albums chart. The band embarked on a world tour in support of Magic Hour, starting with summer shows in North America. On July 10, 2012, they performed the American TV premiere of "Let's Have a Kiki" on Bravo-TV's Watch What Happens Live. They toured Europe in September and October 2012.

On October 23, 2012, while performing at the Camden Roundhouse, Scissor Sisters announced an indefinite hiatus. A year later, Ana Matronic insisted that the band, while still on break, had not permanently split.

The band collaborated on a charity record with MNDR and released "Swerlk" on June 9, 2017, their first release in five years. Proceeds for the single were donated to the Contigo Fund, a nonprofit organization for LGBTQ individuals.

In June 2019, Shears stated the impetus for the band's hiatus was the success of "Let's Have a Kiki" in the US and wanting to end things on a high note: "I didn't know what the fuck to say after that song, quite honestly. When that song came out and did what it did [hitting #1 on the Billboard dance charts], I was just like, 'Well, there it is, I guess we did it.' I truly had no idea what to follow that up with. So I thought, we've been recording and touring for 10 years, and I felt like it was time. This wasn't what anybody in the band had planned to do. So I thought it would be fun to end on a high note. But you know what? That's not to say we're never going to do anything again. The Scissor Sisters will be back." He later noted: "I think reaching that goal, and feeling like we were in a great moment, made it feel like a great time to hang up our hats."

=== 2024–present: Reunion and 2025 tour ===
Following seven years of inactivity, the band's logo appeared on Glasgow's OVO Hydro and Manchester's Co-op Live arenas on October 29, 2024. Their social media outlets teased an upcoming announcement, revealing on October 31 that the band would reunite for a string of shows in 2025, coinciding with the 20th anniversary of their debut album. The band's reunited line-up was revealed to be the trio of Jake Shears, Babydaddy, and Del Marquis, with neither Ana Matronic nor Paddy Boom participating. Longtime drummer Randy Real later revealed that he would return as the Scissor Sisters drummer for their 2025 tour.

Regarding Ana Matronic's absence, Shears noted: "I think it just didn't line up. It's not something that she wanted to do at this moment in time. And I didn't want that to keep us from coming out and playing these songs." Babydaddy elaborated: "It's more her story to tell than ours. Except to say that, I think she's such a part of the spirit of this band, especially at that moment in time. There were definitely conversations, and I think hopefully a good understanding of it just not being the right time. So it is a little funny [to be reuniting without her]. But also, there's the people that want to hear this music again too. Maybe there is some future where Ana comes back and does stuff too. Who knows? She'll be in the back of our minds, for sure. But in the meantime, for the 20th anniversary, it just felt like we wanted to see what these songs do out there." Addressing her absence from the reunion tour, Matronic wrote on Instagram:

People familiar with my story and career arc will know that in the heart of this Showgirl lies a giant Nerd. In the past decade my Nerd self has taken the wheel and is now driving my career. I am currently finishing production on the first season of my history podcast Good Time Sallies, which has grown into several long-term research and writing projects. With contracts signed and schedules agreed on these commitments, the timing of a Scissor reunion does not allow me to join my former bandmates for this tour. I wish the band and our fans all the best… I will be there in spirit to kiki with you!

The band performed at the 2025 Glastonbury Festival, joined onstage by special guests Ian McKellen, Beth Ditto, and Jessie Ware.

== Artistry ==
=== Musical style ===
Scissor Sisters' music can be generally described as a mixture of glam rock, disco and alternative music. They appear to have been heavily influenced by Elton John (who co-wrote and played piano on "I Don't Feel Like Dancin'") despite Shears commenting that he was not familiar with his work prior to the release of their record. Shears has since stated that he has become a big fan. The band also has been compared to ABBA, the Bee Gees, Blondie, KC and the Sunshine Band, Duran Duran who were "the reason we got into music", Matronic stated, Supertramp, Siouxsie and the Banshees who Matronic "wouldn't be here without", David Bowie, 1970s-era Kiss, Queen, Chic, Richard O'Brien and various other dance, disco, rock, and funk acts. Shears also stated that The Beatles have been an influence for him and that he is a huge fan of Paul McCartney and Wings, hence their track entitled "Paul McCartney". However, the band admits that their music is hard to categorise.

The lyrics of their songs, largely written by Shears and Babydaddy, are known for their mixture of wit and tragedy. The songs on their debut album dealt with a number of subjects and issues in a variety of styles, from drug abuse within the gay community ("Return to Oz"), to Shears' deep platonic love for his best friend Mary ("Mary"). Mary died of a brain aneurysm in April 2006, news that devastated members of the band.

Many of Scissor Sisters' songs deal with themes in the lesbian, gay, bisexual and transgender community, relating to the fact that three of the band members, including the two founders, are gay. "Filthy/Gorgeous" is about transgender prostitutes while "Take Your Mama" deals with coming out of the closet to family members. Despite this, Shears stated, "I don't believe sexuality really matters when it comes to music." In an interview featured on the We Are Scissor Sisters... And So Are You DVD, Shears states, "The fact that some of us are gay affects our music the same amount as it does that some of the members of Blondie are straight."

=== Performance style ===
The visuals for Scissor Sisters' self-titled first album and its singles featured artwork by an English illustrator named Spookytim, who had a studio in Brighton called Studiospooky. The artwork was created by a wide variety of techniques and mixed traditional paper-based processes with digital and photographic elements in order to reflect the multi-referential nature of the band's music.

Scissor Sisters are known for their extravagant live performances. In some of their early shows, Shears was known to remove all of his clothes onstage, harking back to his former profession as a go-go stripper; in others, he threw inflated condoms into the audience.

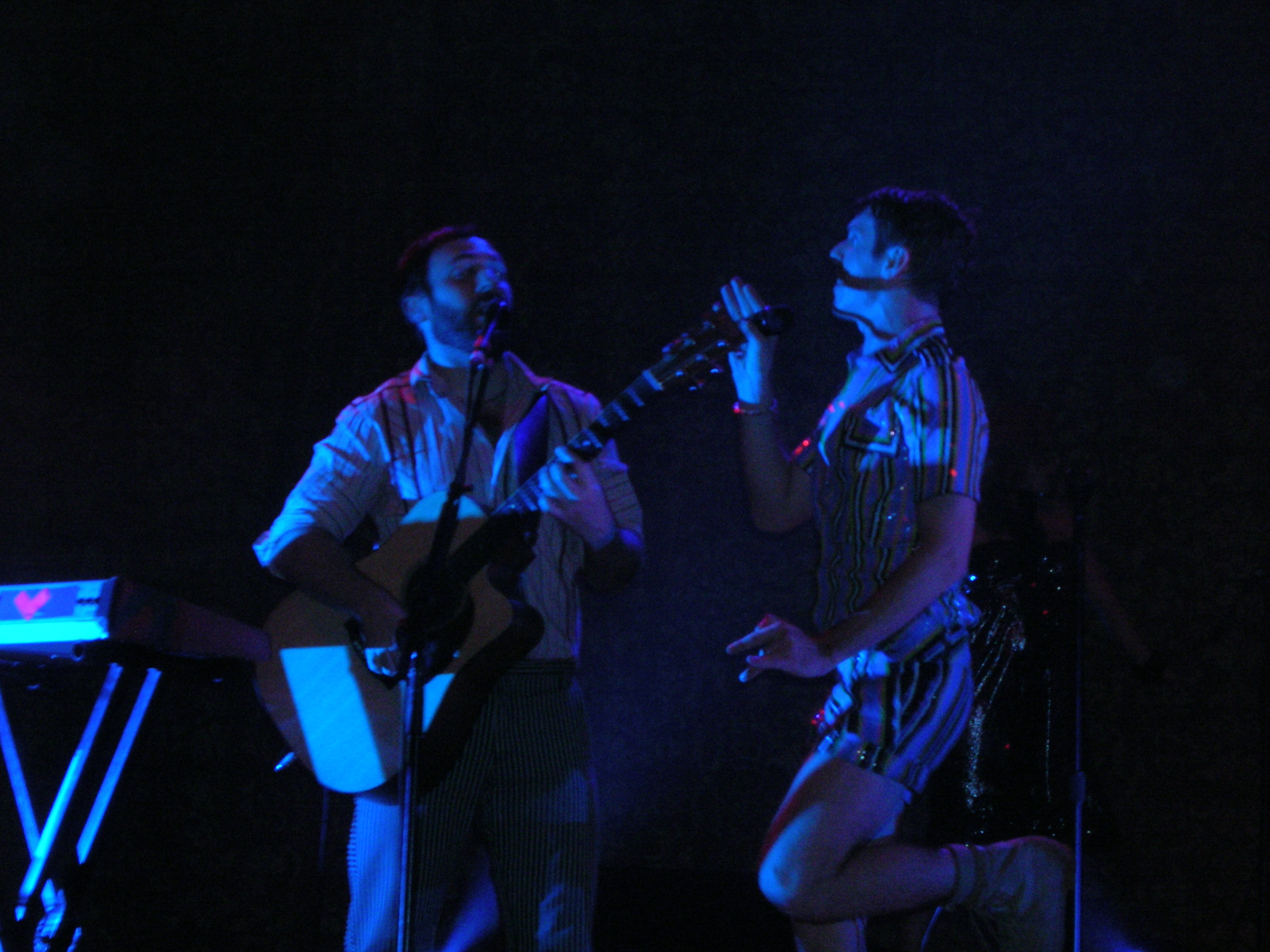
Scissor Sisters on tour in St. Louis, 2007

"Isn't It Strange," a track created during the band's recording session for "Night Work", featured in Shrek Forever After (2010).

DJ Earworm's 2005 song "No One Takes Your Freedom" combined Scissor Sisters' "Take Your Mama" with The Beatles' "For No One", George Michael's "Freedom '90" and Aretha Franklin's "Think".

== Band members ==
Current members

- Jason "Jake Shears" Sellards – lead vocals, piano, occasional guitar (2001–2012, 2017, 2024–present)
- Scott "Babydaddy" Hoffman – bass guitar, keyboards, backing vocals, rhythm guitar (2001–2012, 2017, 2024–present)
- Derek "Del Marquis" Gruen – lead guitar, bass guitar (2001–2012, 2017, 2024–present)

Current touring musicians

- Randy Real – drums, electronic drums, percussion (2008–2012, 2017, 2025–present)
- Amber Martin – backing and lead vocals (2025–present)
- Bridget Barkan – backing and lead vocals (2025–present)
- Karme Caruso – piano, keyboards, synthesizer, keytar (2025–present)

Former members

- Patrick "Paddy Boom" Seacor – drums, electronic drums, percussion (2001–2008)
- Ana "Ana Matronic" Kirby – backing and lead vocals, "mistress of ceremonies", percussion, keyboards (2001–2012; 2017)

Former touring musicians

- John "JJ" Garden – keyboards, rhythm guitar, bass (2004–2012)

== Discography ==
- Scissor Sisters (2004)
- Ta-Dah (2006)
- Night Work (2010)
- Magic Hour (2012)

== Filmography ==
- We Are Scissor Sisters... And So Are You (2004)
- Hurrah! A Year of Ta-Dah (2007)

== Tours ==
- Untitled European Tour (2004)
- Crevice Canyon Tour (2006)
- The Ta-Dah Tour (2007)
- The Night Work Tour (2010/2011)
- Let's Have A Kiki Tour (2012)
- 20 Years of Scissor Sisters Tour (2024)
- The Kiki Continues Summer Tour (2026)

Co-headlining

- The Tits Out Tour (2025) (with Kesha)

As supporting act

- Astronaut Tour in support of Duran Duran (2004)
- Vertigo Tour in support of U2 (2005)
- Touring the Angel in support of Depeche Mode (2006)
- The Monster Ball Tour in support of Lady Gaga (2011)
- BST Hyde Park in support of Duran Duran (2026)

== See also ==
- List of artists who reached number one on the U.S. dance chart
- List of number-one dance hits (United States)
