= Mariko Takahashi's Fitness Video for Being Appraised as an "Ex-fat Girl" =

2004 short film by Nagi Noda

- Directed by: Nagi Noda
- Starring: Mariko Takahashi
- Release date: 2004

Mariko Takahashi's Fitness Video for Being Appraised as an "Ex-fat Girl" (often referred to as Doggy Fitness or Poodle Fitness) is a short film by renowned art director and commercial film director Nagi Noda who created spots for Nike and Coca-Cola and starring Mariko Takahashi, a California born model. The film was created for Panasonic's Ten Short Movies – Capture the Motion series for the 2004 Summer Olympics. The film is a word-for-word parody of Susan Powter's first workout video. Also, exercising with her in the video are six actors dressed in dog costumes, with actual live dogs' heads superimposed over their real heads. Nagi Noda, in her artist's statement, explained that she arrived at the poodle concept after noticing that the dogs' hair cuts resembled muscles. She believed that this concept would help her video appeal to people of all ages.

The video circulated throughout the Internet since it was posted on the Panasonic website along with the other nine short films in 2004. Possibly contributing to its popularity, Noda never explains in the video why people in the video are wearing dog costumes, leaving viewers to speculate.
