= Kiiskilä manor =

Manor in Vyborgsky District, Leningrad Oblast, Russia

Coordinates: 60.69041°N 28.58233°E

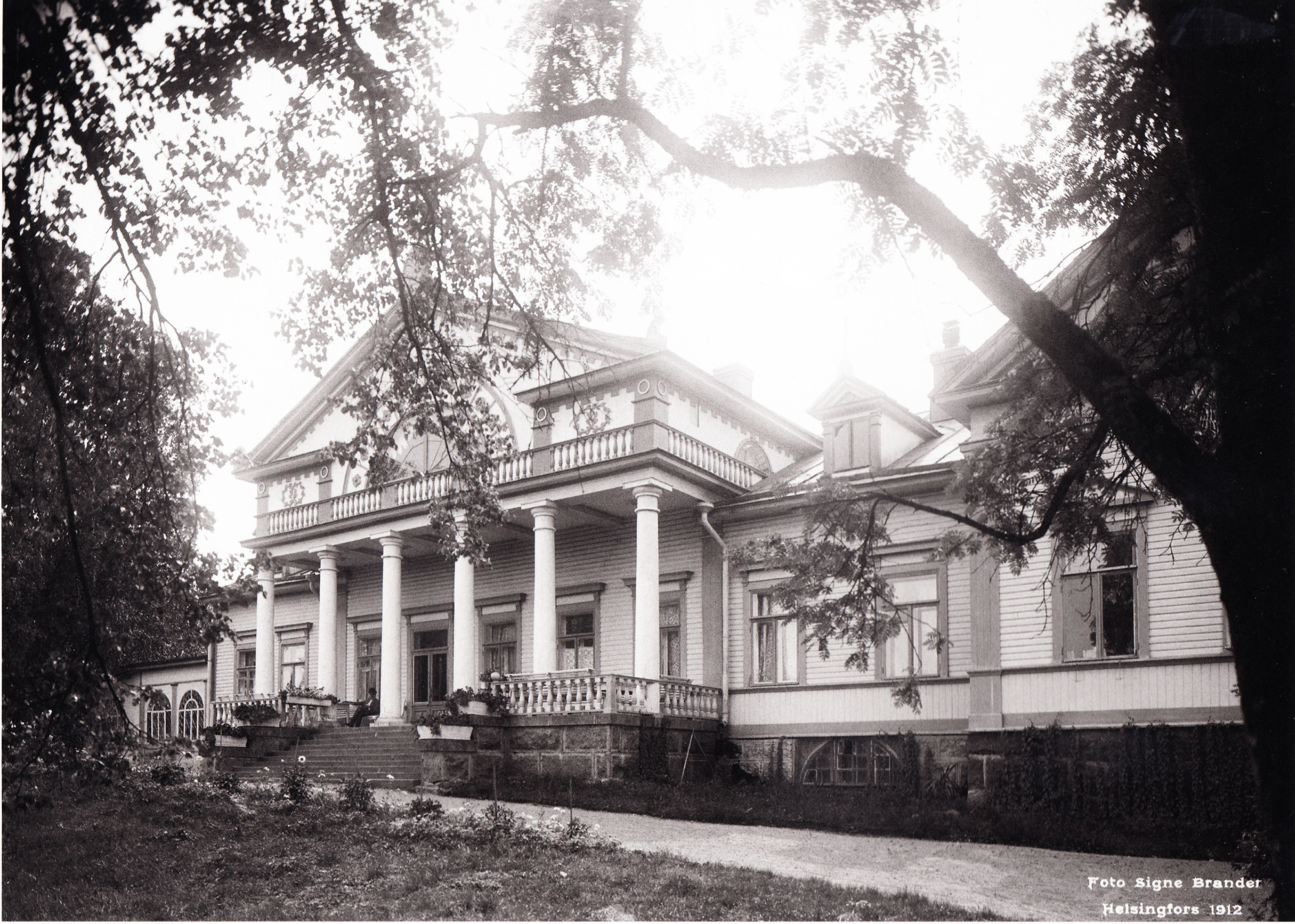
The Kiiskilä manor in 1912

The Kiiskilä Manor is a historic estate located in the former Viipuri rural municipality, situated on the western shores of the Viipuri Bay, in the Kiiskilä village, approximately 10 km southwest of Viipuri. The manor's name derives from the Kiiskijoki river, which flows through its lands. The Kiiskilä Manor is one of the few surviving estates of the Viipuri surroundings, along with Monrepos. Its history dates back to the 1560s, and it has changed hands several times over the centuries.

== The Dannenberg family ==
In the early 19th century the manor belonged to the Sesemann family, who were German merchants in Viipuri. In 1818, it was purchased by Friedrich Dannenberg, another member of a prominent German merchant family in Viipuri. Dannenberg had the old buildings of the manor torn down and a new main building built in their place. In 1841, he gave the Kiiskilä Manor to his daughter Julie and son-in-law Leopold Wilhelm Krohn, who had married at the age of 16.

== The Krohn family ==
Julie and Leopold Wilhelm's children and grandchildren grew up in the manor, including Julius Krohn and Leopold August Krohn, whose children include Aino Kallas, Helmi Krohn (Setälä), Ilmari Krohn, and Kaarle Krohn. Aino and Helmi wrote about Kiiskilä in their books. In 1888, Julius Krohn drowned while sailing to the Viipuri Bay from the manor, and soon after, his parents sold the manor. The War Commissary Viktor Ahrenberg purchased it that year, but the property changed hands many times over the following years.

== The primary school and the buildings ==
The first primary school of the Viipuri Rural Municipality was founded in Kiiskilä in 1855. The wooden main building of the manor, designed by a French architect named Villiers, represents Palladian architecture with six columns on the façade representing the Doric order. Nearby, a gazebo was built in the Roman style where Julius Krohn completed his dissertation. The buildings were surrounded by a large English garden, which was of special interest to Friedrich Dannenberg.

== Soviet time ==
During the Soviet era, the manor was owned by a Leningrad-based shipyard that specialized in submarines. The manor was used by the children of the shipyard employees, and pioneer camps were organized there under the name Chaika ("seagull"). After the Moscow Peace Treaty and the Moscow Armistice, the lands of the manor were ceded to the Soviet Union in 1940 and 1944, respectively.

== Renovations and future plans ==
In 2016 a surgeon named Ilya Sleptsov from St. Petersburg bought the mansion and has been renovating it ever since. He hopes to complete the renovation work by 2030. A brewery already operates on the manor grounds, producing beer in the style of Abraham Krohn, and a collection of statues representing important members of the Krohn family will be erected in the garden. The ground floor of the main building will function as a museum representing the history of the manor and its inhabitants, while the first floor will contain living quarters.

In 2018, a busload of members of the Krohn family visited the manor to acquaint themselves with the renovations. Risto Honkanen, the president of the Krohn family association, was impressed by Sleptsov's work, saying "He [Sleptsov] was well prepared. He has gone ahead with the renovation with reverence and with a big heart."

== Sources ==
- Vuorikuru, Silja (2017). Aino Kallas – Maailman sydämessä ["Aino Kallas — in the heart of the world"]. Finnish Literature Society. ISBN 978-952-222-424-8.
- Jeskanen, Jenni (13 December 2020). "Kulttuurihistoriallisesti arvokas kartano sai uuden elämän" ["A manor of cultural significance has a new lease of life"]. Helsingin Sanomat. Helsinki: Sanoma. pp. A 24–25.

== Literature ==
=== Non-fiction ===
- Krohn, Helmi: Kiiskilän hovi. Otava 1915.
- Nikander, Gabriel (red.): Herrgårdar i Finland III (Monrepos, Kiiskilä och Liimatta). Söderström, Helsingfors 1932.

Kiiskilän kartano on yhä paikallaan "The Kiiskilä manor is still there.". – Karjala nro 24, 16.6.1994.

=== Works of fiction dealing with Kiiskilä ===
- Krohn, Helmi: Isäni Julius Krohn ja hänen sukunsa ("My father Julius Krohn and his family"). Otava 1942.
- Krohn, Helmi: Eeva-Liisa, entisen koulutytön päiväkirja ("Eeva-Liisa, the diary of a one time schoolgirl"). Otava 1943.
- Kallas, Aino: Katinka Rabe, kirja lapsesta ("Katinka Rabe, a book about a child."). Otava 1920.
- Kallas, Aino: Kanssavaeltajia ja ohikulkijoita: Muistoja ja muotokuvia. ("Fellow travellers and passers-by.") Otava 1945.
