= Julius Krohn =

Finnish academic and writer (1835–1888)

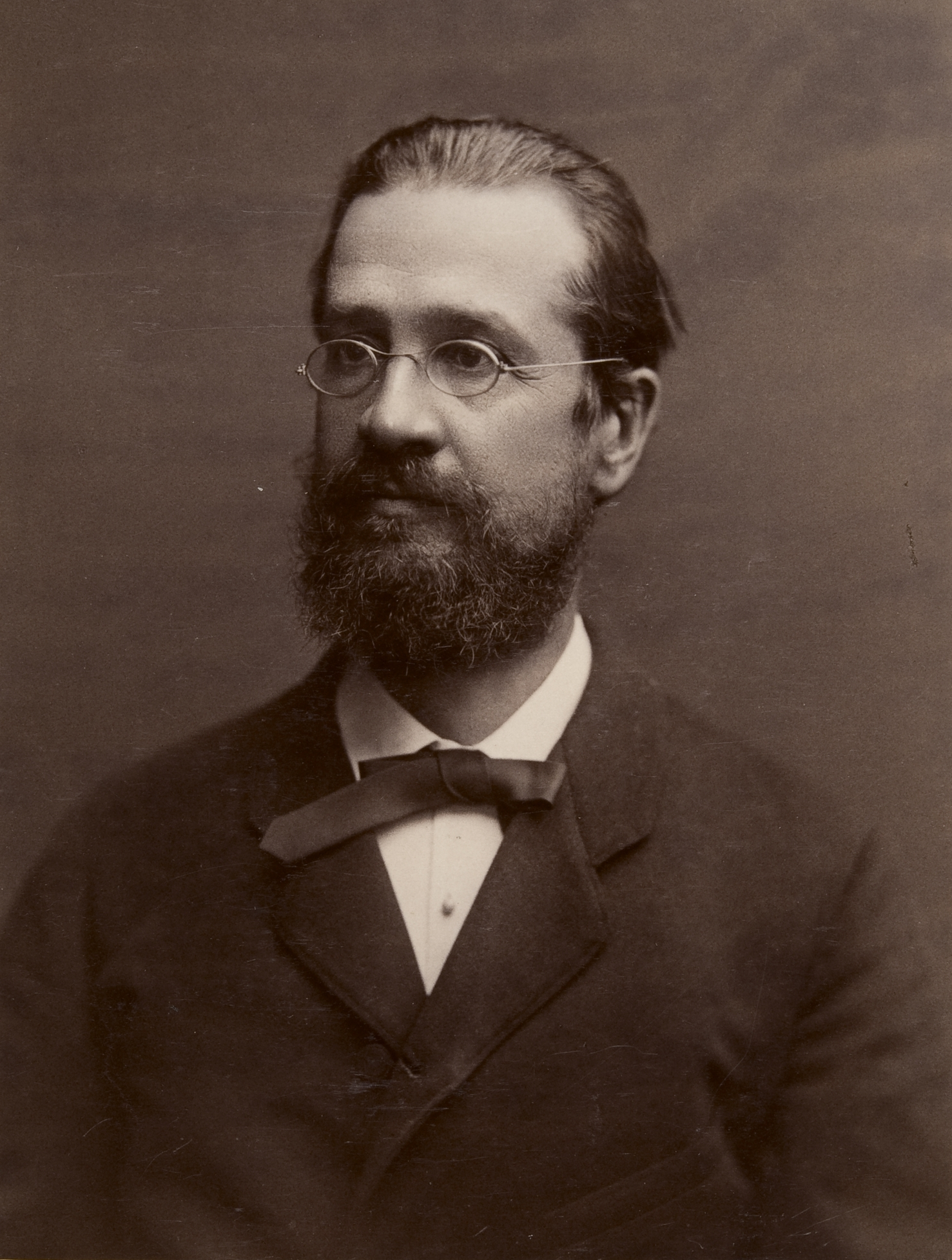
- Born: 19 April 1835; Viipuri, Grand Duchy of Finland, Russian Empire
- Died: 28 August 1888 (aged 53); Bay of Vyborg, Russian Empire
- Spouse(s): Emilia "Emma" Sofia Nyberg; Maria "Minna" Wilhelmina Lindroos
- Children: Kaarle Krohn; Ilmari Krohn; Helmi Krohn; Aune Krohn; Aino Kallas
- Parent(s): Leopold Wilhelm Krohn; Julie Dannenberg

Academic background
- Education: University of Helsinki
- Influences: Elias Lönnrot

Academic work
- School or tradition: Fennoman
- Main interests: Finnish mythology, Kalevala Scholarship
- Notable ideas: The Historic-Geographic Method
- Influenced: Kaarle Krohn

Julius Leopold Fredrik Krohn (19 April 1835 – 28 August 1888) was a Finnish folk poetry researcher, professor of Finnish literature, poet, hymn writer, translator and journalist. He was born in Viipuri and was of Baltic German origin. Krohn worked as a lecturer on Finnish language in Helsinki University from the year 1875 and as a supernumerary professor from 1885. He was one of the most notable researchers into Finnish folk poetry in the 19th century. His native language was German.

== Life ==
Krohn's mother was Julie Dannenberg, a daughter of the Baltic German family at Kiiskilä manor near Vyborg. The versatile and talented Julie spoke eight languages and played the piano brilliantly. The other half of Dannenberg's family was of Ingrian background.

From 1857 he taught Finnish at Elisabeth Blomqvist's girls' school, and that same year he co-founded one of the first Finnish-language primary schools in the country together with a group of friends.

== Works and influence ==
Krohn mostly preferred not to write under his foreign surname, but either adopted a pen name or worked as part of a collective, such as the fennomans, of which he was a leading member. Using pseudonyms, he translated many of Johan Ludvig Runeberg's works into Finnish, and researchers also concluded that he penned the Finnish lyrics for the Finnish national anthem.

Under his most notable pseudonym Suonio, he published poetry; e.g. Mansikoita ja mustikoita 1856–61 ("Strawberries and blueberries") and Kuun tarinoita ("Tales of the moon"). Under this pseudonym he also published children's literature, including five picture books which became widely popular. His rhythmic verses and rhymes were particularly well received.

As Suonio, he worked as editor of Suomen Kuvalehti and translated many of Sir Walter Scott's novels, such as A Legend of Montrose. In January 1864, Krohn founded Maiden ja merien takaa (''Over Land and Sea''), the first Finnish-language weekly magazine in the country.

Krohn was an important patron of the writer Aleksis Kivi. Using his own financial resources, he supported Kivi during his development as an author, published his poems, corrected linguistic errors in his manuscripts, and publicly defended his novel Seven Brothers against its critics. Despite this support, Kivi was not always appreciative, and reportedly referred to his patron as a mediocre poet and a "German peddler". Nonetheless, Krohn's support is considered to have been significant for Kivi's career.

=== Scientific work ===
An important contribution to a history of Finnish literature was Krohn's doctoral thesis Suomenkielinen runollisuus ruotsinvallan aikana (1862). Krohn was also the first to develop a scientific method for the study of folklore, the historic-geographic method. This method, which is connected with nationalist understandings of folk culture, involves careful comparison of variant texts of an item of folklore to the end of identifying the "original" version (as well as its origin).

Julius Krohn died by drowning in Bay of Vyborg in a yachting accident at the age of 53. His work with folklore and the Finnish language was continued by his son Kaarle Krohn, who published much of his scientific work posthumously. This work was further developed by their student Antti Aarne.

== Children ==
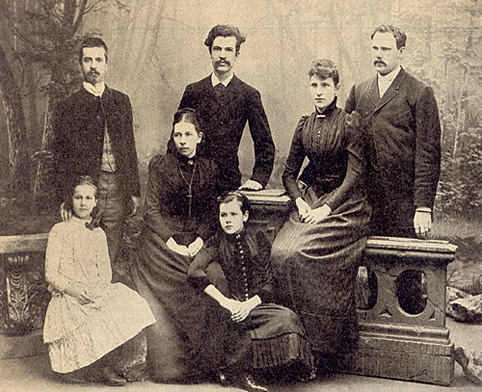
Back row from left Ilmari Krohn, Kaarle, Helmi with E.N. Setälä; in front Aune Krohn, Helena née Cleve and Aino

Apart from Krohn's son Kaarle, mentioned above, his son Ilmari became a composer of church music. His daughter Aino married the Estonian nationalist Oskar Kallas and was known as a writer by the name Aino Kallas. His daughter Helmi Krohn, also an author, married Eemil Nestor Setälä, later the acting head of state of Finland in November 1917, after the abdication of Nicholas II of Russia.

== Publications ==
- Krohn, Julius (February 1981). Kaarle Krohn (ed.). Folklore Methodology: Formulated by Julius Krohn and Expanded by Nordic Researchers (Paperback). Roger L. Welsch (translator). Austin, Texas: University of Texas Press. p. 192. ISBN 0-292-72432-2.
- Etext books on-line at the Project Gutenberg site
  - Yrjö Aukusti Wallin ja hänen matkansa Arabiassa (in Finnish) Non fiction work on the ethnographer and adventurer Georg August Wallin
  - Maksimilian Aukusti Myhrberg (in Finnish)
  - Vanha tarina Montrosesta Finnish translation of A Legend of Montrose by Sir Walter Scott
