= Kalulu (disambiguation) =

Kalulu (ca. 1865–1877) was an African slave and adopted child of Henry Morton Stanley.

Kalulu may also refer to:

- Aldo Kalulu (born 1996), French footballer
- Gédéon Kalulu (born 1997), French-born Congolese footballer
- Pierre Kalulu (born 2000), French footballer
