= Aune Krohn =

Finnish evangelical Christian, writer and translator

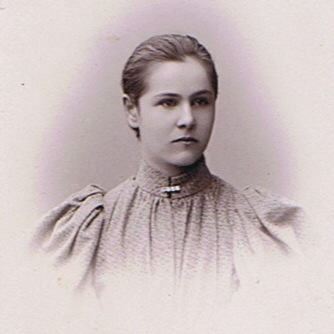
- Aune Krohn
- Born: 6 March 1881; Helsinki
- Died: 16 January 1967 (aged 85); Hattula
- Occupations: writer and translator
- Writing career
- Subject: Religious

Aune Ottilia Krohn (6 March 1881 – 16 January 1967) was a Finnish evangelical Christian, writer and translator.

== Life ==
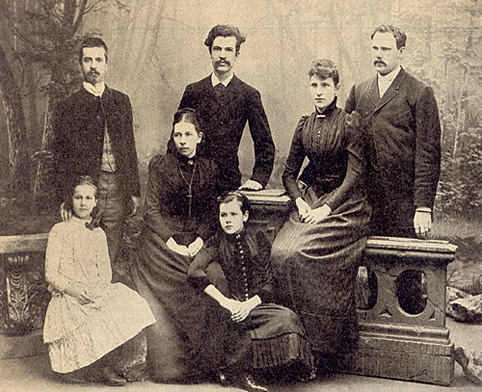
Back row from left Ilmari Krohn, Kaarle, Helmi with E.N. Setälä; in front Aune Krohn, Helena née Cleve and Aino

Krohn was born in Helsinki in 1881 to Maria Wilhelmina (Minna) Lindroos and Professor Julius Krohn. Her father was one of the first writers in the Finnish language. Her parents changed the families first language to be Finnish and not Swedish. Her mother was the first headmistress of the first girls' school to use Finnish as its primary language. The three sisters wrote and taught, but they were told that it was their role to support the male members of the family.

Krohn's siblings were noted writers, folklorists and musicologists. Krohn was an early translator into Finnish. Her translated works include books by the Brothers Grimm, Jack London, Rudyard Kipling and Morton Stanley's book titled (and partially about) Kalulu. In 1912, Krohn translated the words of the hymn "Nearer, My God, to Thee" into Finnish.

Krohn cared for her mother for twenty years and also for Liisa Tarvo who was ill with tuberculosis. It has been speculated that their relationship may have been physical but there is no convincing evidence.

Krohn died in Hattula in 1967.

== Works include ==
- The Stars Look Down A.J.Cronin (translation to Finnish)
- Jungle Book Rudyard Kipling (1894 translation to Finnish)
- Kalulu Morton Stanley (translation to Finnish)
