= Aino Kallas =

Finnish-Estonian writer (1878–1956)

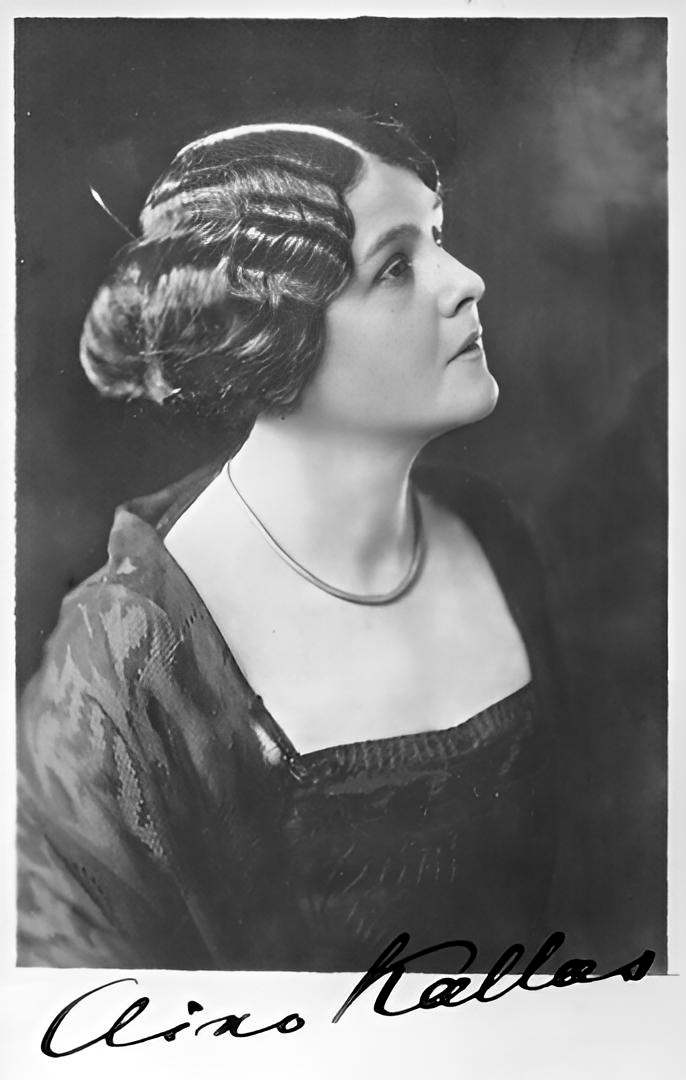
- Aino Kallas
- Born: 2 August 1878; Kiiskilä, Grand Duchy of Finland, Russian Empire
- Died: 9 November 1956 (aged 78); Helsinki, Finland
- Spouse: Oskar Kallas
- Children: 5
- Parent(s): Julius Krohn; Maria "Minna" Wilhelmina Lindroos
- Relatives: Aune Krohn (sister); Ilmari Krohn (half-brother); Kaarle Krohn (half-brother); Helmi Krohn (half-sister); Salme Setälä (niece)
- Writing career
- Pen name: Aino Krohn, Aino Suonio
- Genres: Symbolism, Neo-romanticism

Aino Julia Maria Kallas (née Krohn ; 2 August 1878 – 9 November 1956) was a Finnish-Estonian author. Her novellas are considered to be prominent pieces of Finnish literature.

== Life ==
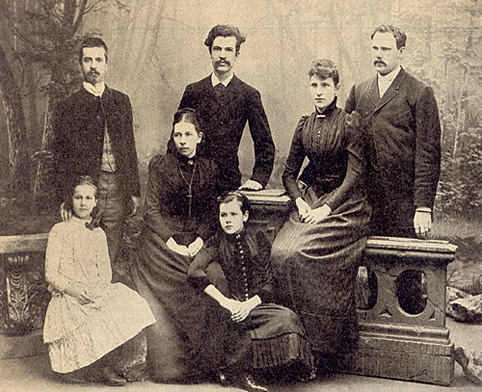
Back row from left Ilmari Krohn, Kaarle, Helmi with E.N. Setälä; in front Aune Krohn, Helena née Cleve and Aino, photo taken on 2 January 1894

Kallas was the daughter of Julius Krohn, a nationally known Finnish scientist and fennoman, and the sister of the folklorist Kaarle Krohn and the writer Helmi Krohn. Her father was also one of the first people to publish poetry written in the Finnish language. In 1900, Kallas married Oskar Kallas, an Estonian scholar, linguist, doctor of folklore and later diplomat. The couple lived in Saint Petersburg and had five children. In 1904, they moved to Tartu, Estonia. Kallas became interested in the history and culture of her new homeland and she joined Noor-Eesti, a sociocultural society which campaigned for the independence of Estonia. Although she continued writing in Finnish, she often wrote about Estonian subjects. She lived in London from 1922 to 1934, while her husband was Estonia's ambassador to the United Kingdom. She published her diaries for the period 1897-1931 in the 1950s.

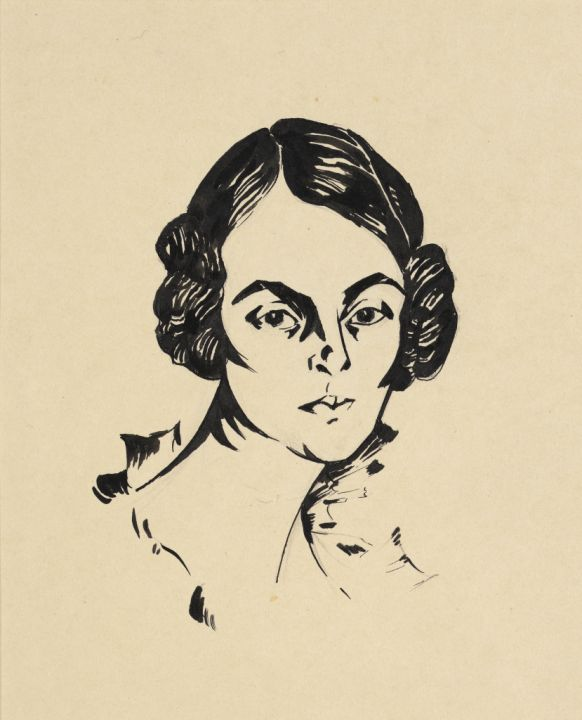
Portrait of Aino Kallas by Konrad Mägi, 1918. Indian ink on paper.

A recurring theme in Kallas's novellas is what she termed "the slaying Eros", a love that often leads to death, especially prominent in her trilogy of Barbara von Tisenhusen (1923), Reigin Pappi (The Pastor of Reigi, 1926), and Sudenmorsian (The Wolf's Bride, 1928). The Pastor of Reigi and Barbara von Tisenhusen were soon translated into English and published in 1927 as Eros the Slayer. The language of her most famous story, Sudenmorsian, a werewolf story set in 17th century Hiiumaa, is rich with archaic, Romantic, colorful prose, something of a Kallas trademark. These three stories have more recently been published in one English-language volume as Three Novels (1975). A collection of her short stories was published in English under the title The White Ship, with a foreword by John Galsworthy in 1924.

Her short story Imant and His Mother was made into opera Mare and Her Son (1935) by Finnish composer Tauno Pylkkänen.

Kallas was known as a regular resident of Hotel Arthur in Kaisaniemi, Helsinki, and she is dedicated to the hotel title room number 543.

== Awards ==
- Order of Merit of the Estonian Red Cross, III class (1938)
- Aleksis Kivi Award (1942)

== Legacy ==
The Aino Kallas Award, which recognizes Estonian individuals or collectives that have made significant contributions to the development of Estonian–Finnish cultural relations, is named after Aino Kallas.
