= Salme Setälä =

Finnish architect and writer (1894–1980)

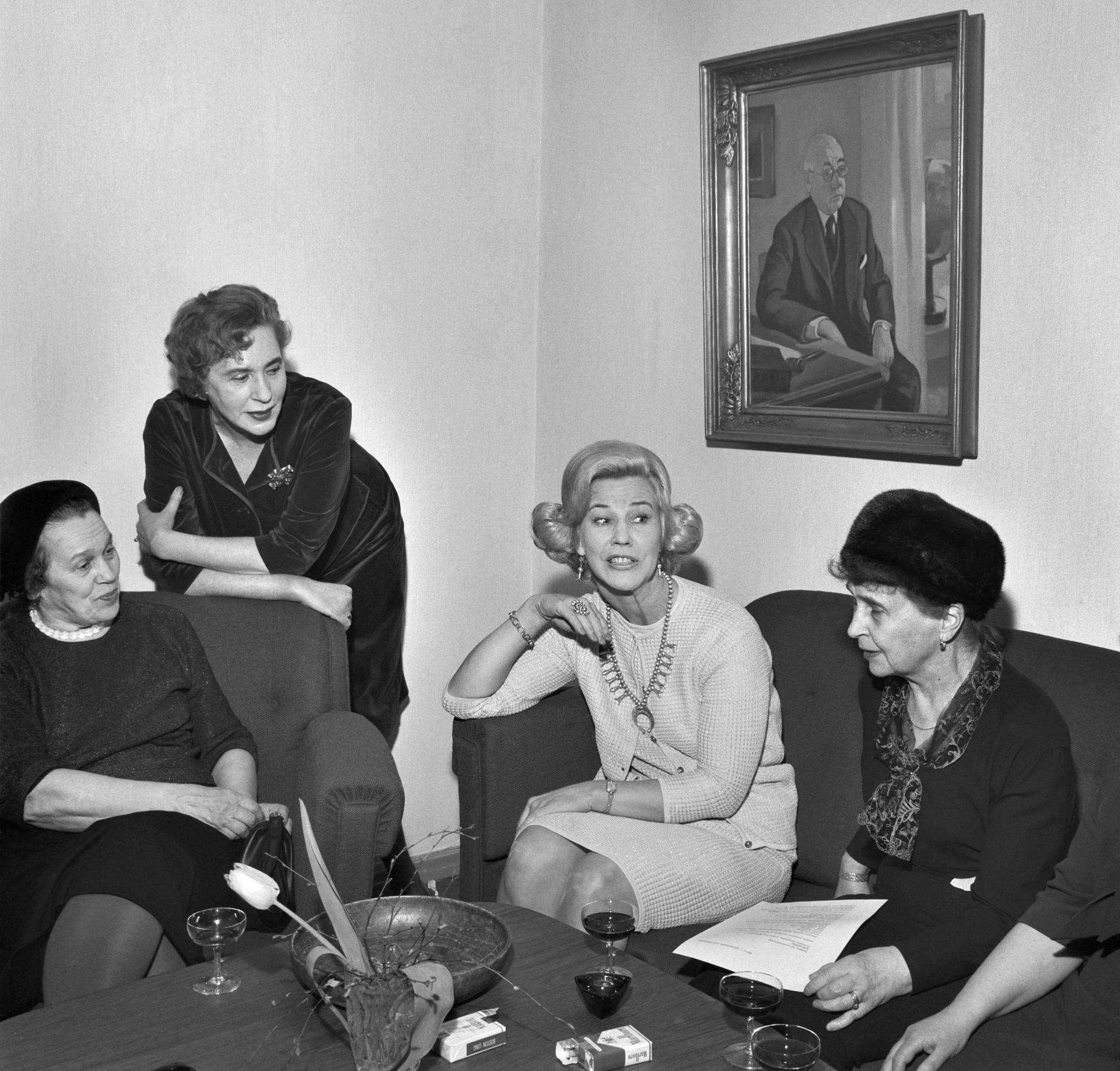
Salme Setälä (left), Helvi Erjakka, Eeva Joenpelto and Sylvi Kekkonen in 1962

Salme Setälä (from 1919–1930 Cornér; 18 January 1894, Helsinki — 6 October 1980, Helsinki) was a Finnish architect and writer. She graduated from the Helsinki University of Technology in 1917. She worked in a number of architecture offices. In the early 1950s she made several study trips in Europe. After that she was hired in the government office for land-use planning. She planned the land use for over 30 areas in Finland.

Setälä's main interest was interior design and furniture. She also wrote books, both fiction and non-fiction. Her parents were Eemil Nestor Setälä and Helmi Krohn, and she was of Baltic German descent through her maternal grandfather Julius Krohn. From 1919–1930 she was married to the journalist Frithiof Cornér, and the painter, graphic artist and illustrator Helmiriitta Honkanen was their daughter.
