= Tauno Pylkkänen =

Finnish composer (1918–1980)

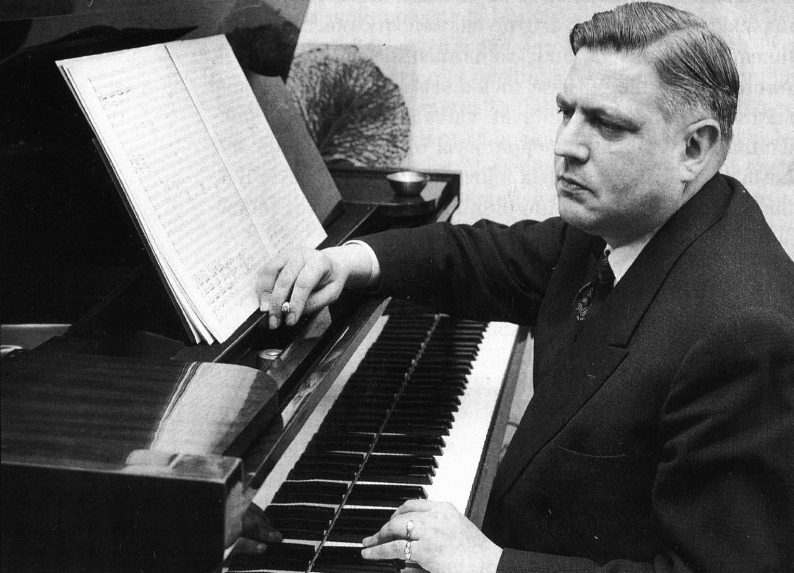
Tauno Pylkkänen, 1959

Tauno Kullervo Pylkkänen (March 22, 1918 – March 13, 1980) was a Finnish composer. He was a popular opera composer and was nicknamed during his lifetime as Northern Puccini.

Pylkkänen was an orphan born in Helsinki during the Finnish Civil War whom actor Hilma Rantanen and office manager Väinö Veikko Pylkkänen adopted as their foster son from a newspaper advertisement. His real father, Heikki Pakarinen, who had fallen into the Red Guard against his will, died in the Hämeenlinna prison camp in August 1918.

Pylkkänen was a student of Leevi Madetoja and Selim Palmgren, and studied at the Helsinki Conservatory, then in Paris, Rome, and Vienna. He made his breakthrough as a composer with the opera Mare ja hänen poikansa (1943) after Aino Kallas, which was premiered in the Finnish Opera in 1945. It was followed by ten more operas, including the internationally successful Sudenmorsian (1950). From 1960 to 1967 he was artistic director of the Finnish Opera.

In addition to the operas he composed a symphony, a symphonic fantasy, six symphonic poems, a cello concerto, chamber music works, a cantata, film music, a choir cycle for women's voices, songs and two song cycles.

== Personal life ==
Pylkkänen was homosexual, which was not publicly known during his lifetime. His friend, assistant professor Saara Lilja, revealed the matter in her 2000 memoir. In December 1948, Pylkkänen was caught in a police raid on a "gay meeting place" and brought to justice (homosexuality was a crime in Finland until 1971), but he was acquitted and the case was not made public. Later, Pylkkänen suffered from alcoholism, depression and memory problems. His ability to work waned soon after finishing the Unknown Soldier, so he stopped composing at the age of 49 and was on leave from the National Opera in May 1968. His last major work was a missed manuscript on the history of the Finnish National Opera. In his last years he spent a quiet life in the Lalluka Artists' Home in Etu-Töölö, Helsinki.
