= Henry Morton Stanley's first trans-Africa expedition =

Expedition in the 1870s

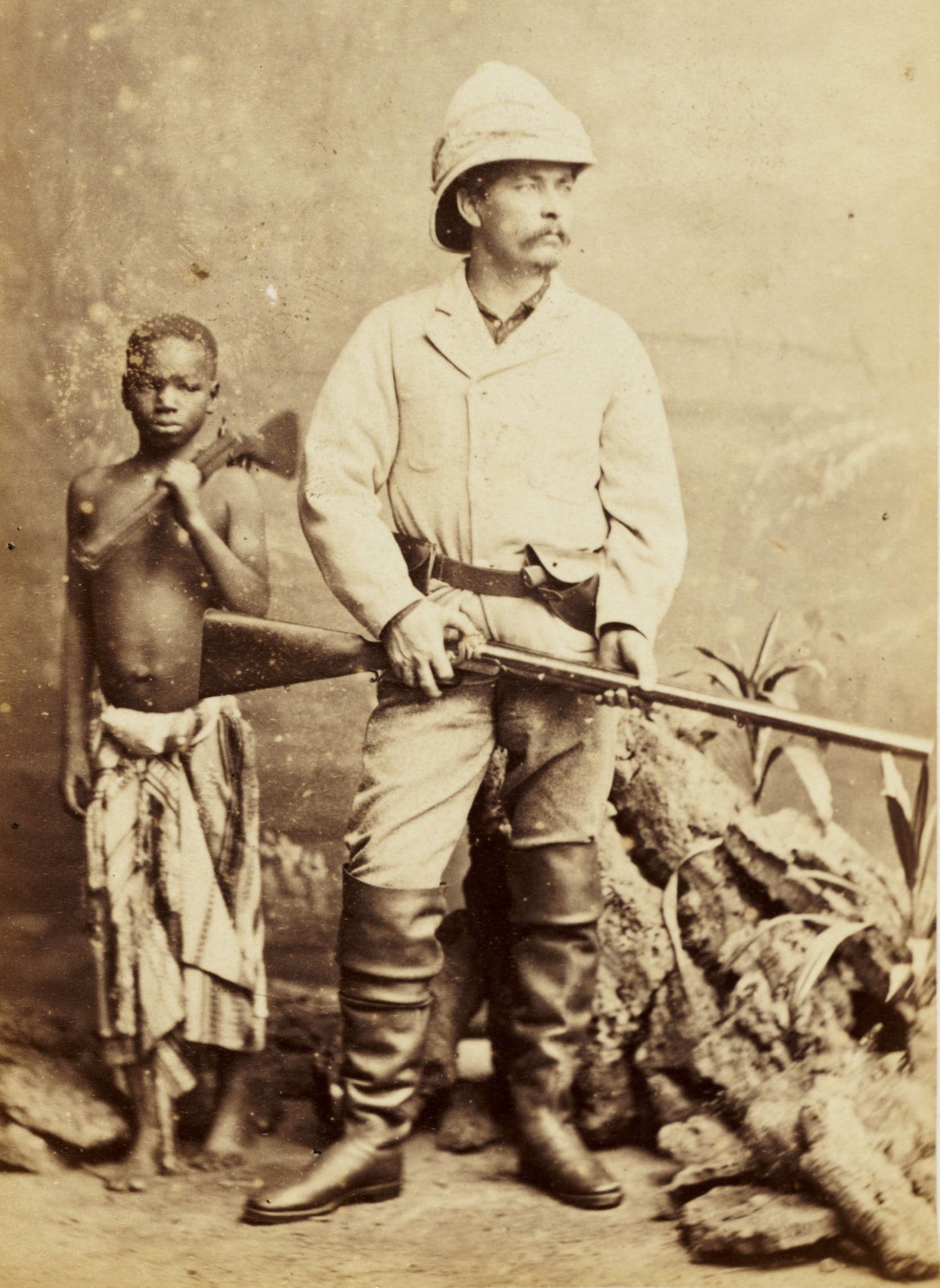
Stanley posing later (in London) with Kalulu in the "suit he wore" when he found Livingstone.

Between 1874 and 1877 Henry Morton Stanley traveled Central Africa east to west, exploring Lake Victoria, Lake Tanganyika and the Lualaba and Congo rivers. He covered 7,000 miles (11,000 km) from Zanzibar in the east to Boma at the mouth of the Congo in the west. The expedition resolved several open questions concerning the geography of Central Africa, including identifying the source of the Nile, which he proved was not the Lualaba and is in fact the source of the Congo River.

== Previous African journey ==
This was Stanley's second journey in central Africa. In 1871–72 he had searched for and successfully found the missionary and explorer David Livingstone. In his publications, Stanley described greeting him with the famous words: "Dr. Livingstone, I presume?", but his report in this is disputed.

== Objectives ==
Stanley's journey had four principal aims, to:

1. Explore Lake Victoria and its inflowing and outflowing rivers
2. Explore Lake Albert and its inflowing and outflowing rivers
3. Explore Lake Tanganyika, determining the direction of flow of the Ruzizi River at the north end of the lake
4. Explore the Lualaba River downstream towards its outflow

There was controversy among earlier explorers as to whether these lakes and rivers were connected to each other and the Nile. Richard Burton thought that Lake Victoria might have a southern inlet, possibly from Lake Albert, meaning that the source of the Nile was not Lake Victoria as explorer John Speke had argued. Samuel Baker thought that Lake Albert might have an inlet from Lake Tanganyika. Livingstone thought that Lualaba was the source of the Nile.

Being sponsored by the New York Herald—at the instigation of editor James Gordon Bennett Jr.—and The Daily Telegraph newspapers, Stanley he was expected to write dispatches for them. He subsequently wrote a book of his experiences, Through the Dark Continent.

== Preparations ==
On September 21, 1874, Stanley arrived in Zanzibar. He took with him three young Englishmen, Frederick Barker and the brothers Francis and Edward Pocock, and Kalulu, an African he had taken to England on his earlier trip and who was educated briefly in England. He also took 60 pounds of cloth, copper wire and beads (Sami Sami) for trading, a barometer, watches and chronometers, sextant, compasses, photographic equipment, Snider rifles and elephant gun(s), and the parts of a 40-foot (12 m) boat with single sail built by James Messenger. He named it the Lady Alice after his fiancée. In Zanzibar he recruited African porters to a total of 230 people, including 36 women and 10 boys. He recruited mainly from the Wangwana, Wanyamwezi and coast people from Mombasa.

== Circumnavigation of Lake Victoria ==
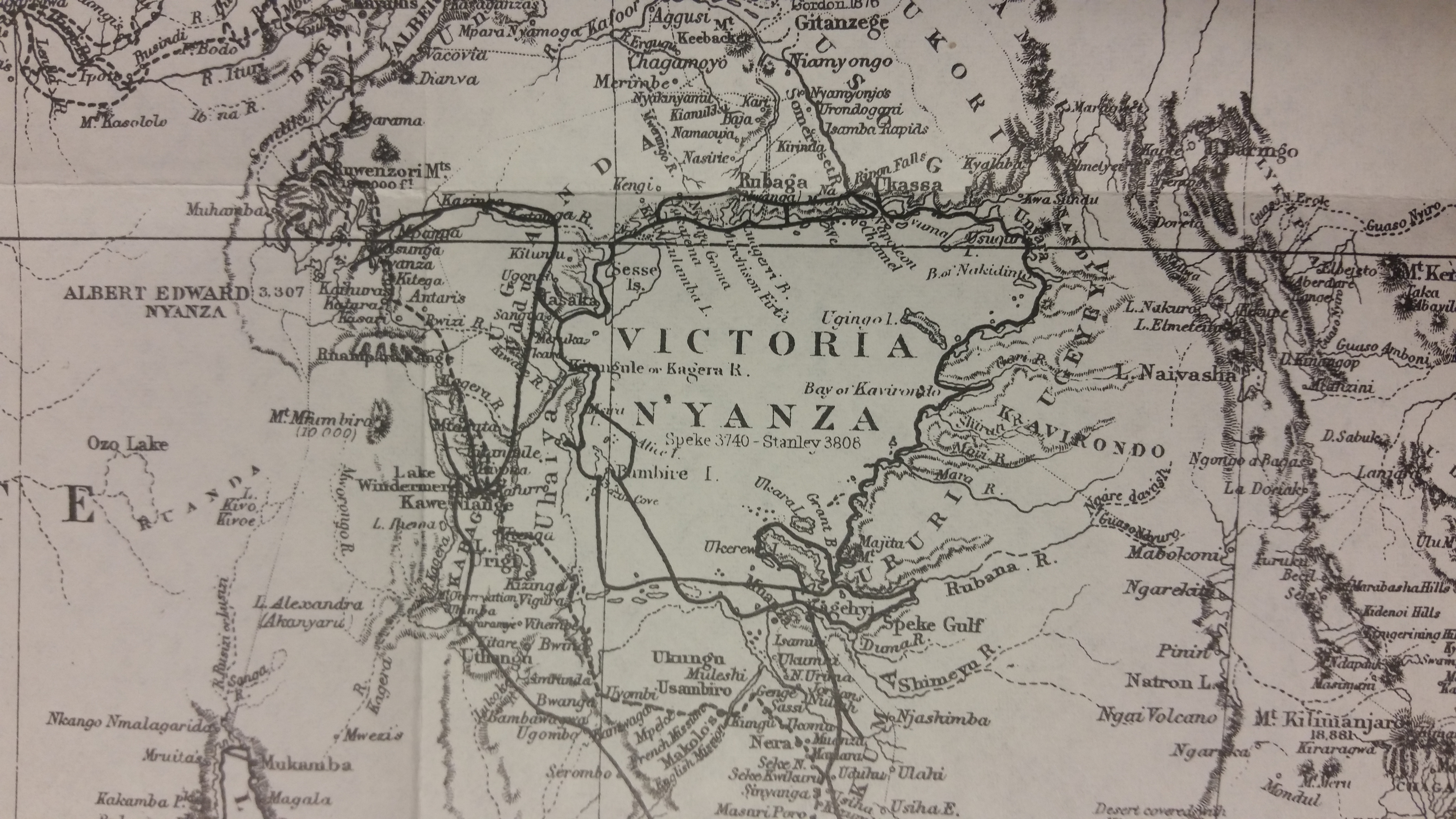
Victoria Nyanza. The black line indicates Stanley's route.

On March 8 Stanley, with ten sailors and a steersman, left his camp site near Kageghi in Lady Alice. They explored and named Speke Bay, after the first European to see the lake. They also discovered the Simiyu River inlet in the south. Passing Ukerewe Island, he was attacked by Wavuma people in canoes but escaped after firing at his attackers.

On April 4 he landed on the northern bank near the Ripon Falls, the only outlet of the lake, which had been identified as the source of the Nile by Speke. He was received as a royal guest by Muteesa I of Buganda. Stanley wrote that Buganda would be an ideal country to establish missions and for European trade. On April 21 Stanley's party headed further southward. First they reached the inlet of the Kagera River, which they would later explore on their way to Lake Albert. In an attempt to get supplies of food, they landed on the island of Bumbireh. The local inhabitants alternated peace talks with thefts and threats, and stole their canoe paddles. Ultimately the crew escaped, killing some locals in the process. Later Stanley wrote that he killed 10 (and elsewhere 14) in his dispatches to newspapers. This would later be used to traduce his character as a ruthless killer. Why he misstated the number of deaths is not clear; his biographer Tim Jeal has tried to clarify.

On May 5, the party arrived back in Kagehyi and rejoined the main group. In the meantime Barker had died of disease, as had Mabuki Speke (who was on earlier travels with Livingstone, Speke, James Grant, and Burton). Stanley had spent 57 days exploring Lake Victoria. His detailed measurements and descriptions led to a major revision of its geography. He established that the Kagera River was its main inflow, and that it was 4,093 feet (1,248 m) above sea level, with a maximum depth of 275 feet (84 m).

== Lake Albert ==
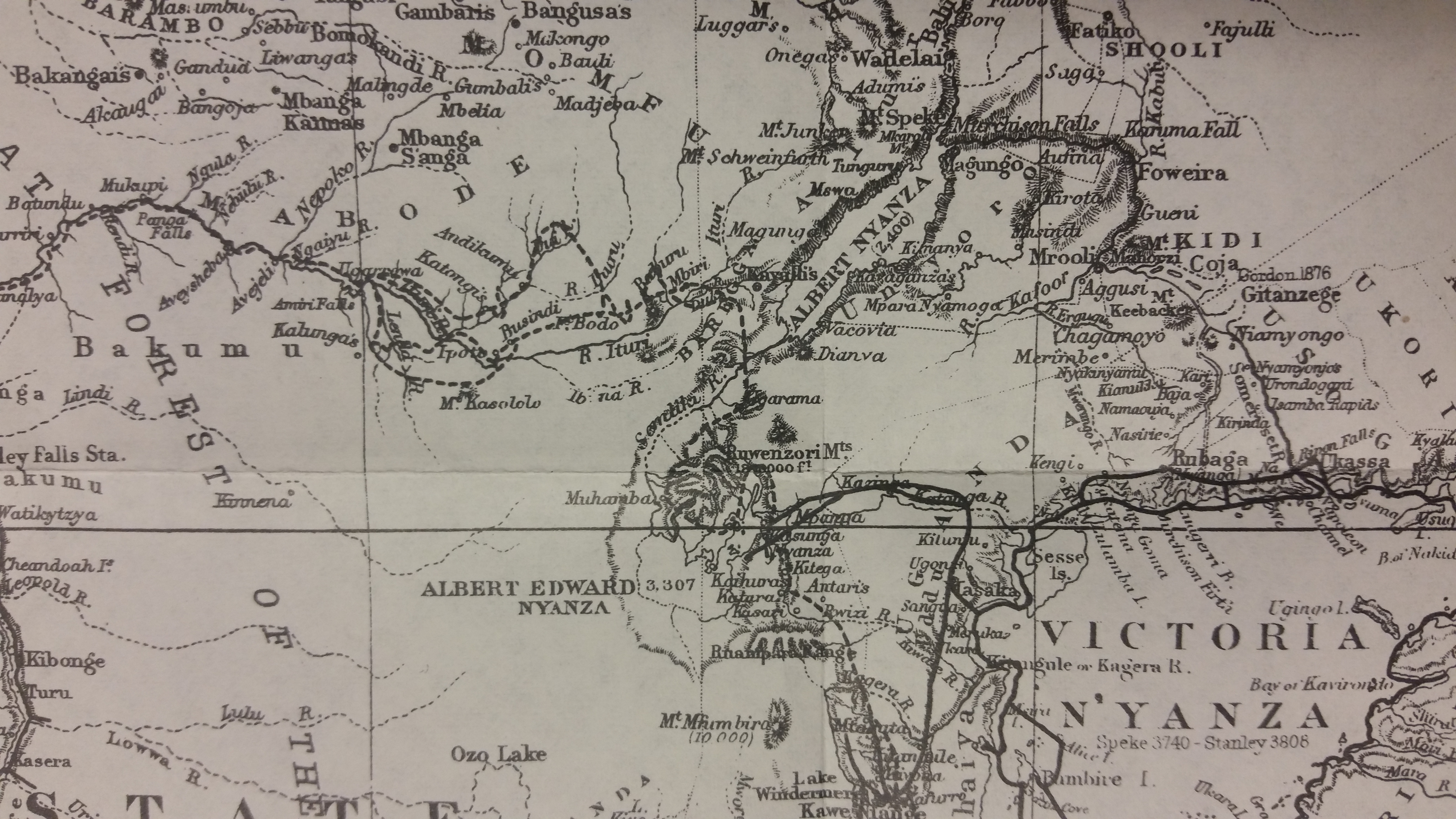
Albert Edward Nyanza. The black line indicate Stanley's route.

Stanley intended to explore Lake Albert next. However, war between Uganda and Wavuma forced him either to "renounce the project of exploring the Albert, and proceed at once to the Tanganika...or to wait patiently until the war was over." After the war ended with an Ugandan victory, however, his expedition was thwarted by Kabarega, king of the Bunyoro.

== Lake Tanganyika ==
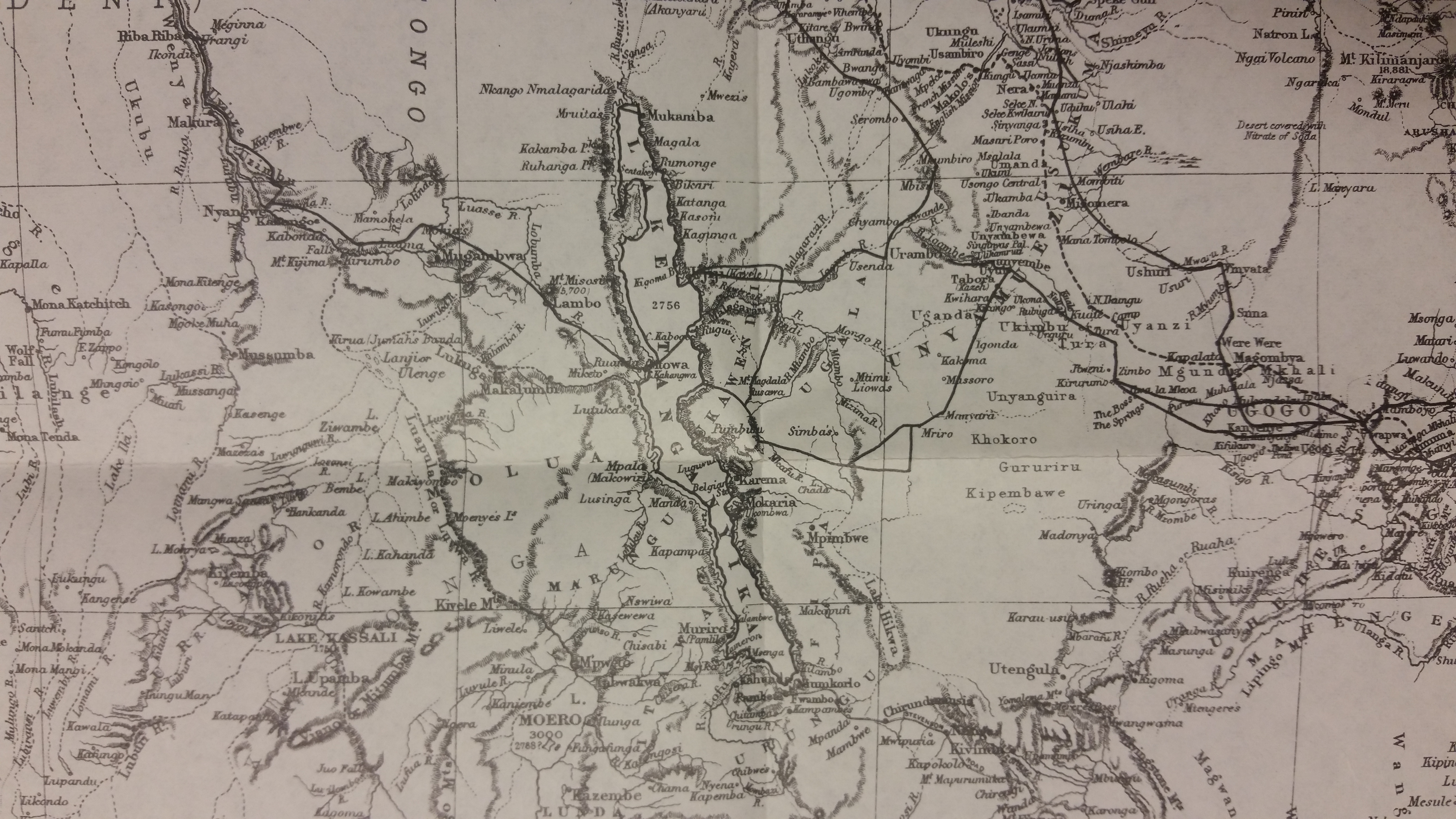
Lake Tanganyika. The black line indicates Stanley's route.

On May 27, 1876, the party arrived in Ujiji on the shore of Lake Tanganyika, the village where Stanley had famously met Livingstone a few years before. Their objective was to survey the lake, seeking inlets and outlets. By July 31 the 930 miles (1,500 km) of the lake perimeter was charted. Its main outlet was found to be the Lukuga River on the western shore. The depth of the lake was measured to be in excess of 1,280 feet (390 m).

== Rivers Lualaba and Congo ==
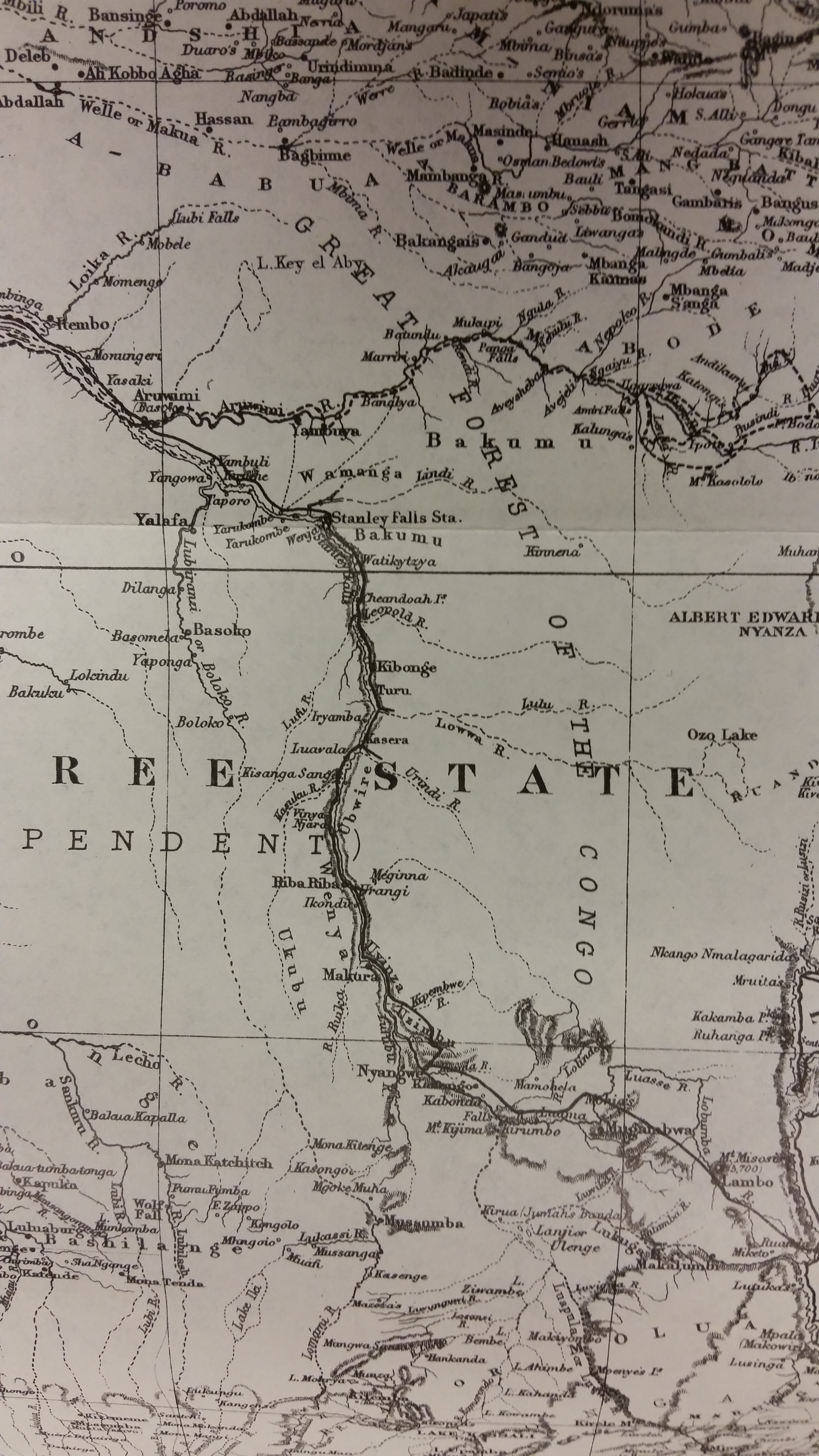
The black line indicates Stanley's route.

The final objective was to determine whether the Lualaba River fed the Nile, the Congo or even the Niger. On August 25, 1876, Stanley left Ujiji with an expedition of 132, crossing the lake westward to Manyema, to enter the heart of Africa. In October they reached the confluence of the Luama River and the Lualaba River. Entering Manyema, they were in a lawless area containing cannibal tribes. Tippu Tip based his source of slaves here. Also, Livingstone had witnessed a massacre of Africans here and did not succeed in getting any further. Nor had Vernon Cameron in 1874. However Stanley reached a contract with Tippu Tip, in which they agreed to accompany each other for "sixty marches-each march of four hours' duration." They reached Nyangwe on October 28.

The party left Nyangwe overland and entered the dense Matimba forest on November 6. On November 19 they reached the Lualaba again where Stanley proceeded downstream with Lady Alice, and Tippu Tip kept pace on the eastern shore. They traversed through the lands of the cannibal Wenya. Though he attempted to negotiate a peaceful thoroughfare, the tribes were wary as their only experience of outsiders was of slave traders. They reached Kindu on December 5, 1876, but it was not until they reached Vinya-Njara that Stanley could conclude a "blood-brotherhood" with the natives and peace ensued. Tippu Tip left Stanley at this point, while Stanley departed downstream on December 28 with 149 men, women and children on 23 canoes.

On January 6, 1877, after 400 miles (640 km), they reached Boyoma Falls (called Stanley Falls for some time after), consisting of seven cataracts spanning 60 miles (97 km), and the confluence of the Lomami River. It took them until January 28 to reach the end of the falls, sometimes passing overland and having to defend themselves from attacks by the cannibal natives. Stanley reached the confluence of the Aruwimi River on February 1 and then the land of the Bemberri cannibals. Finally at the village of Rubunga, they were able to enter into a blood-brotherhood with the natives. Here Stanley learned that the river was called Ikuta ya Kongo, proving to him that he had reached the Congo, and that the Lualaba did not feed the Nile.

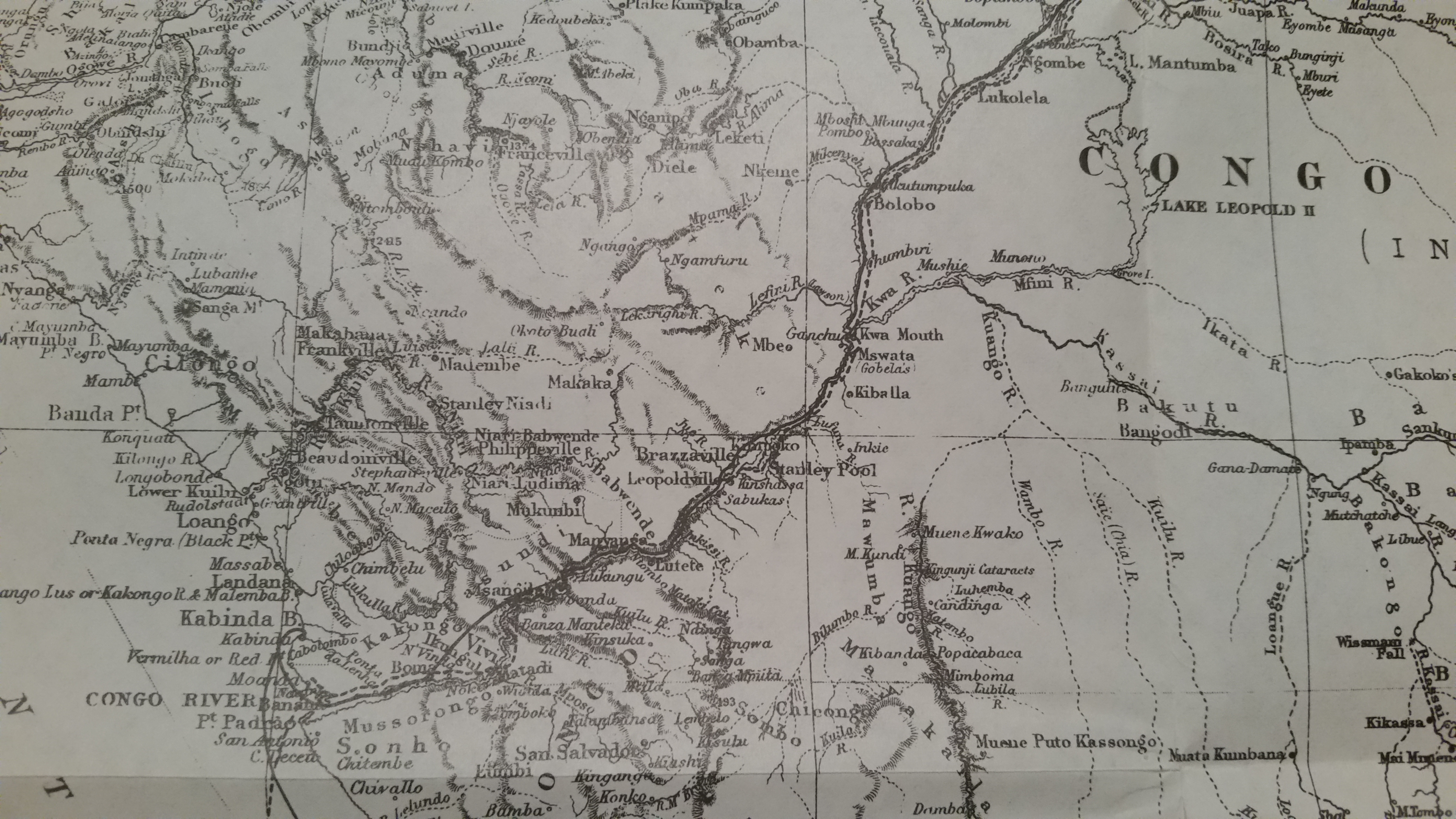
Stanley's route is depicted by the solid black line.

Stanley was then attacked by the Urangi and then the Marunja, both of whom possessed Portuguese muskets. His thirty-first fight along the river was with the Bangala on February 14, facing 63 canoes and 315 muskets. On February 18 they reached the confluence of the Ikelemba River and were able to trade at Ikengo. By February 26 they reached Bolobo, where they were welcomed by the king of Chumbiri. They reached the confluence of the Lefini River and the Kasai River with the Congo on March 9. This was the location of their thirty-second and last fight.

On March 12, they reached Stanley Pool (now Pool Malebo). Here Stanley met with Mankoneh, the Bateke chief and Itsi, chief of Ntamo, forming a blood-brotherhood. This is the site of the present day cities Kinshasa and Brazzaville, capitals of the Democratic Republic of the Congo and the Republic of the Congo.

Further downstream were the Livingstone Falls, 1,235 miles (1,988 km) downstream from Nyangwe, a series of 32 falls and rapids with a fall of 1,100 feet (340 m) over 155 miles (249 km). On March 16 they started the descent of the falls, which cost numerous lives, including those of Frank Pocock and Kalulu, his England-educated servant. On 30 July, Stanley stated, "We drew our boat and canoes into a sandy-edged basin in the low rocky terrace, and proceeded to view the cataract of Isangila." Only five days' journey from Boma, Stanley stated, "I saw no reason to follow it farther, or to expend the little remaining vitality we possessed in toiling through the last four cataracts."

On August 3 they reached the village of Nsanda. From there Stanley sent forward four trusted men to Boma with letters in English, French and Spanish, asking them to send food for his starving people. On August 6 relief came, being sent by representatives from the Liverpool trading firm Hatton & Cookson. August 9 they reached Boma, 999 days since leaving Zanzibar on November 12, 1874. The party then consisted of 115 people, including three children born during the trip.

Most probably (Stanley's own publications give inconsistent figures), he lost 132 people through disease, hunger, drowning, killing and desertion. Some 18 deserted, a low figure given the dangers of the country they had crossed.

== Return ==
In Boma he mailed his editor Bennett in New York to send money for his party and arrange homeward travel. He also learned through his publisher that his fiancée Alice had married another man.

They left Boma for Kabinda, arriving on August 12. Eventually the party went to Luanda, Angola, arriving on September 28. From there they went on to Simon's Town on October 21, and finally Zanzibar, via HMS Industry, arriving on November 26. On December 13, Stanley left Zanzibar on SS Pachumba for home, being carried on his men's shoulders to the longboat ferrying him to the ship.

In articles about his discoveries he urged Western powers to organise trade with Central Africa and reduce the slave trade in the interior. Stanley's book Through the Dark Continent, describing his journey, was published in 1878 and was a great success.
