= Oskar Kallas =

Estonian diplomat, linguist and folklorist (1868–1946)

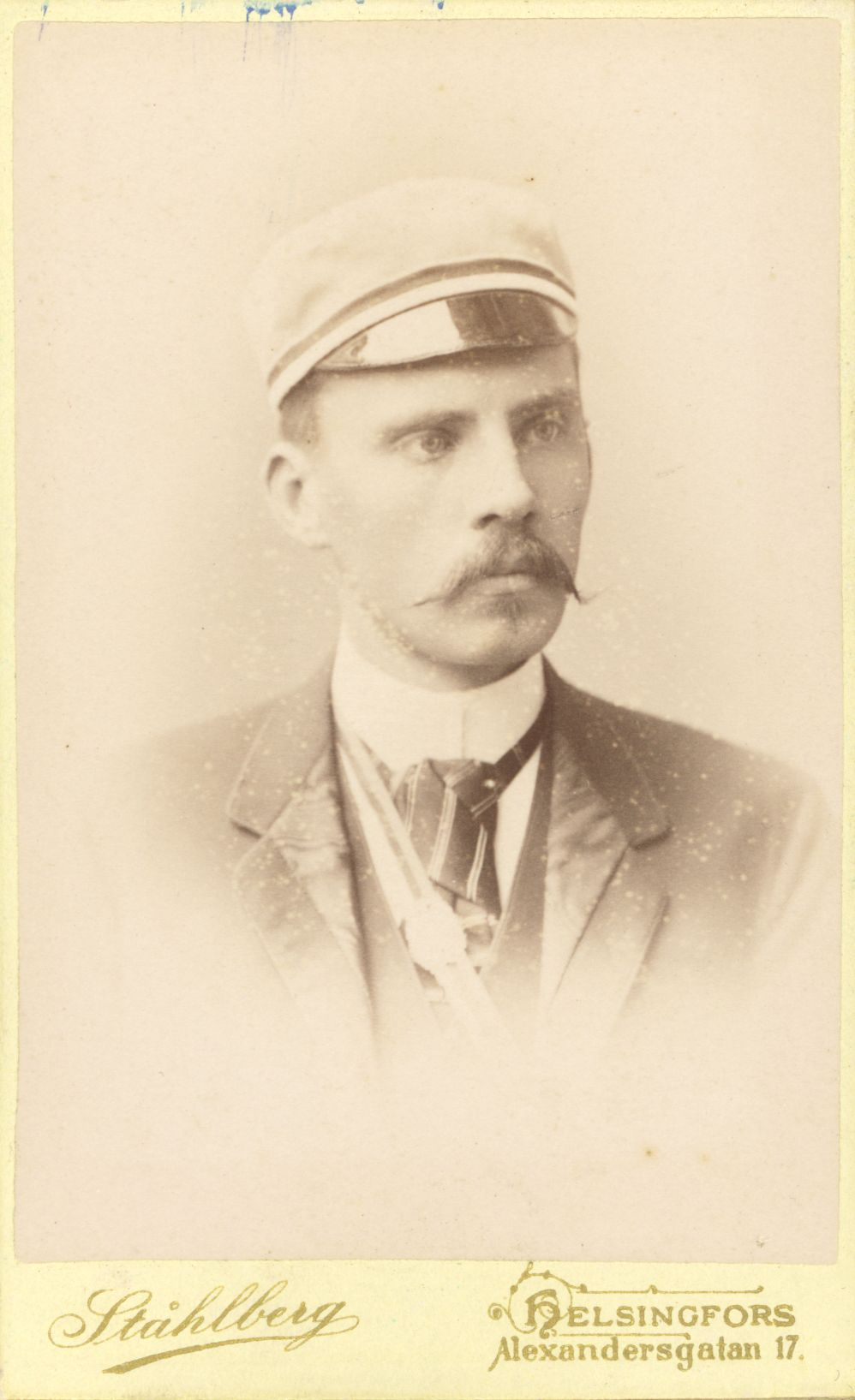
Oskar Kallas during his studies in Helsinki, 1892-1893

Oskar Kallas (also Oskar Philipp Kallas; 25 October [O.S. 13 October] 1868 in Kirikuküla, Saaremaa – 26 January 1946 in Stockholm) was an Estonian diplomat, linguist and folklorist. He was the husband of the Finnish writer Aino Kallas.

== Education ==
Oskar Kallas was the youngest son of the Vicar of Kaarma on the island of Saaremaa. He developed an interest in Estonian folklore and Finnic languages at an early age. Kallas assisted the folklorist Jakob Hurt in his epic collection of Estonian folk poetry. In 1889, he undertook his first trip to Finland, which proved influential. Kallas studied classical philology at the University of Tartu between 1887 and 1892, then studied Finnish folklore and Finno-Ugric languages at the University of Helsinki from 1892 to 1893.

== Estonian national awakening ==
Kallas was politically active as a student at the University of Tartu. Together with his friend Jaan Tõnisson, who later became a politician and Estonian head of state, he was involved in the nationalist student association Eesti Üliõpilaste Selts. He became an important figure in Estonian independence aspirations within Tsarist Russia.

After graduation Kallas taught at various schools in Narva and St. Petersburg. At that time, together with Jaan Tõnisson, Kallas founded the prestigious newspaper Postimees which opposed the Russification in Estonia.

== Personal life ==
While studying at the University of Helsinki, Kallas came in contact with the folklorist Kaarle Krohn, under whose guidance he wrote his doctoral thesis (which he defended in 1901). On 6 August 1900 he married Krohn's sister, the writer Aino Kallas, at the Helsinki Lutheran church. He was then appointed as a lecturer in comparative linguistics at the University of St. Petersburg from 1901 to 1903.

== Career ==
In 1903 Kallas worked as a journalist at the newspaper Postimees, as well as a high school teacher in Tartu. He became the first principal of Estonia's first girls' school (today's Miina Härma Gymnasium), founded in Tartu in 1906. In 1909 Kallas was one of the founders of the Estonian National Museum (Eesti Rahva Muuseum) in Tartu and was a volunteer department head for many years. Kallas is particularly known for his research on the language and culture of the Estonian villages in the area of Ludza in Latgale.

=== Diplomacy ===
With the Estonian independence in 1918, Kallas joined the diplomatic service of Estonia. He was the Estonian representative in Finland. From 1922 until his retirement in 1934 Kallas was the Estonian envoy in London.

== Exile ==
Oskar Kallas and his family fled the Soviet occupation of Estonia to Sweden. He lived there in exile until his death. In February 1946, his body was buried in Helsinki.
