= Isa Asp =

Finnish poet

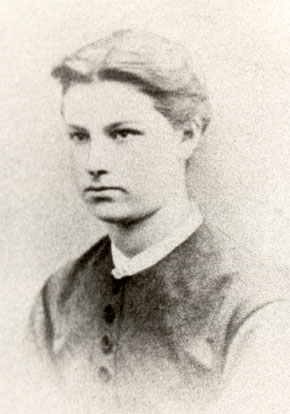
- Born: 4 February 1853; Utajärvi, Finland
- Died: 12 November 1872 (aged 19); Jyväskylä, Finland
- Other names: "Louise" Asp
- Education: teacher training college in Jyväskylä
- Known for: "first woman Finnish poet", and "first lesbian Finnish icon"

Isa Asp (4 February 1853 – 12 November 1872) was the "first woman Finnish poet". She is considered Finland's first lesbian icon. She died aged nineteen of tuberculosis leaving about 100 poems the most known of which is "Lullaby to a Wave". After death her poems were published, statues have been created and several biographies written.

== Life ==
Asp was born in Utajärvi in 1853. She was one of the nine surviving children of Jaakko Asp and Beata Elisabet Asp (née Puhakka). Asp was a precocious child who followed her father's example and wrote poetry. She was taught Swedish by her grandmother. When she first attended school they recognised her pre-knowledge.

The family moved to Suomussalmi. Her first surviving poetry was written there when she was 19. The poetry talks of her respect for her father and her country. In 1864 she attended a private school in Raahe where she was taught in Swedish. She was befriended by the local priest Fanny Hethal. She graduated in 1866 she was at home talking to her friends by letter. She created a magazine called Lahja which was only shown to her family, but it ran for 22 issues. The following year she found a boyfriend but he died of pneumonia in the following spring.

Publication was made possible when she discovered the magazine Trollsländan and she sent off her poems. Trollsländan was written and organised by Alexandra Gripenberg, Zachris Topelius and his daughter Toini Topelius.

In 1871 Asp began to write poetry in Finnish after attending a teacher training college in Jyväskylä.

== Death and legacy ==
Asp died in Jyväskylä in 1872 of tuberculosis leaving approximately 100 lyrical poems the most known of which is "Lullaby to a Wave". Asp has been called the "first woman Finnish poet". A first biography of her by Helmi Krohn was published in 1912. Since she died, several statues, more biographies and books of her poetry have been made.

== Personal life ==
Multiple sources state that Asp was lesbian, she became known as the "Sappho of Finland", and is also considered to be Finland's first lesbian icon. Asp wrote what was interpreted as emotionally and eroticly charged poems for her best friend Lydia Lagus at the seminar in Jyväskylä. The biography of JH Erko, published by Martti Jukola in 1930 state that she was lesbian.
