= Helmi Krohn =

Finnish writer, translator and editor (1871–1967)

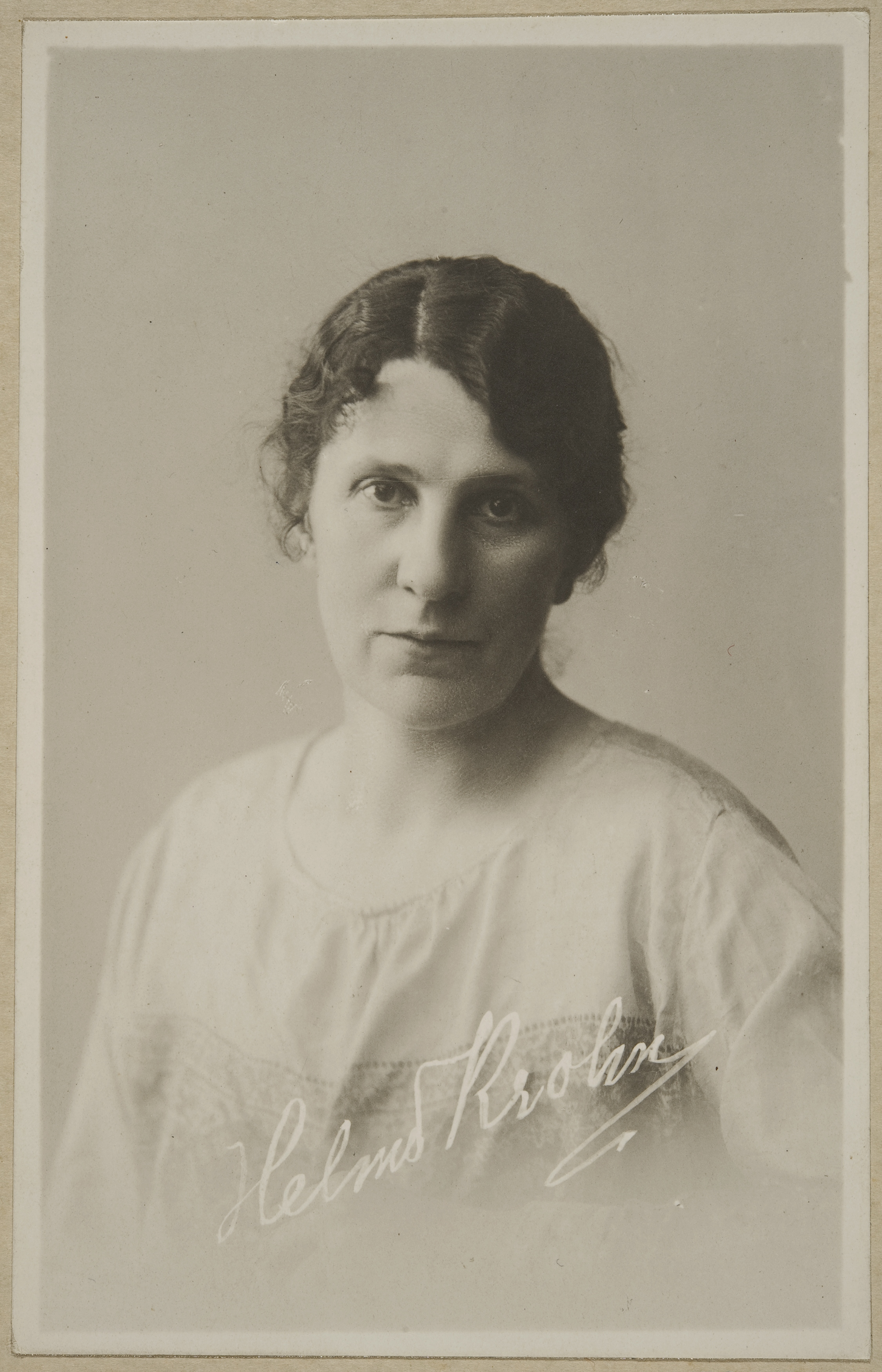
- Krohn in the 1920s
- Born: 31 October 1871; Helsinki, Grand Duchy of Finland, Russian Empire
- Died: 18 October 1967 (aged 95); Helsinki, Finland
- Spouses: Eemil Nestor Setälä (m. 1891; div. 1913)
- Children: 4; including Salme Setälä
- Parent(s): Julius Krohn; Emma Nyberg
- Relatives: Kaarle Krohn (brother); Aune Krohn (half-sister); Aino Kallas (half-sister)

Helmi Anni Krohn, also Helmi Setälä (31 October 1871 – 18 October 1967), was a Finnish writer and translator who wrote fiction, biographies and children’s books. She was also an editor and publisher.

== Biography ==
Krohn was born in Helsinki in 1871 to Julius Krohn. Her father's original language was German but he became a professor of Finnish literature. He died in a sailing accident when she was a teenager. Krohn's brother, Kaarle Krohn was a folklorist whilst her sister, Aino Kallas, was another noted writer.

In 1892, Krohn married the politician Eemil Nestor Setälä and took the name Setälä. Architect and writer Salme Setälä was their daughter. During the marriage, Krohn had written Surun lapsi (Child of Sorrow) which, as she later explained to a friend, Prof. Zachris Castren, was as autobiographical as she dared. The book describes a woman who was surprised to find the "secrets of marriage." The heroine, like Krohn, was annoyed that her parents had not told her about sexuality and what happened inside marriage. Krohn commented that writing the book had been a release for her. She describes that book as a "child of joy".

Krohn also wrote letters to Erkki Melartin and Jalmari Finne after 1906 which supply details of her ideas. The following year she became the editor of the magazine Lapland which was a job she held until 1935. From 1909 to 1910, she was the editor-in-chief of the journal Valvoja.

Her divorce in 1913 was an unusual occurrence in Finland at the time. The divorce created financial concerns and she created her first biography that year of the "first Finnish woman poet," Isa Asp. She worked as an editor at the publishing company Otava from 1912 to 1919.

Krohn was an advocate for Spiritualism. In 1950, she translated into English a book by Einer Nielsen who was a Danish spiritualist, discredited as a fraud. The book Solid Proofs of Survival was his last work and it was published by the Psychic Book Club.

Krohn died in Helsinki in 1967.
