= Eemil Nestor Setälä =

Finnish politician (1864–1935)

Valtioneuvos Eemil Nestor Setälä
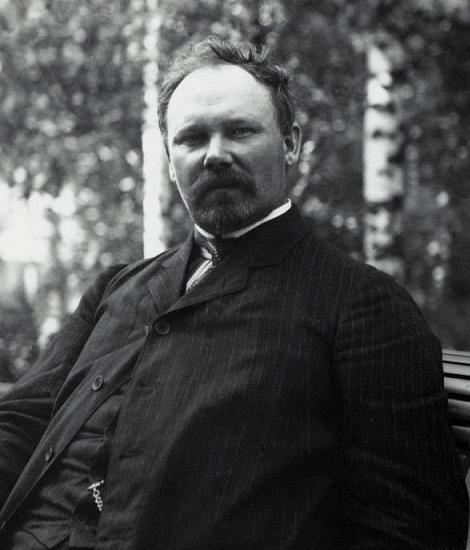
- Setälä, c. 1930

Chairman of the Senate of Finland
- In office 8 September 1917 – 27 November 1917
- Preceded by: Oskari Tokoi
- Succeeded by: Pehr Evind Svinhufvud

Personal details
- Born: 27 February 1864 Kokemäki, Grand Duchy of Finland, Russian Empire
- Died: 8 February 1935 (aged 70) Helsinki, Finland
- Party: National Coalition Party
- Spouse(s): Helmi Krohn (m. 1891; div. 1913) Kristiane Nicoline Thomsen (m. 1913)
- Children: 6; including Salme Setälä
- Relatives: Kai Setälä (great-nephew)

Eemil Nestor Setälä (pronounced [ˈeːmil ˈnestor ˈsetælæ]; 27 February 1864 – 8 February 1935) was a Finnish politician who served as Chairman of the Senate of Finland from September to November 1917. He is regarded as one of the principal authors of the Finnish Declaration of Independence.

Setälä was a linguist, professor of Finnish language and literature at Helsinki University from 1893 to 1929. He was a major influence on the study of Finnish language, the founder of the research institute Suomen suku ("Finnish kin"), and creator of the Uralic Phonetic Alphabet.

== Life ==
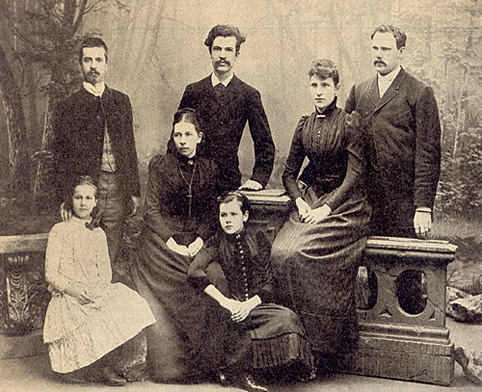
Back row from left Ilmari Krohn, Kaarle, Helmi with E.N. Setälä; in front Aune, Helena née Cleve and Aino

Setälä was born in 1864. Already as a secondary school pupil in Tavastehus, encouraged by his teacher docent Arvid Genetz, he independently wrote a Finnish syntax that was published in 1880 while he himself was still in the seventh form — a feat that demonstrated his exceptional philological talent.

In 1892 he married the writer and editor Helmi Krohn, and she took the name Setälä which she used until they divorced in 1913. A divorce was unusual at this time in Finland.

Architect and writer Salme Setälä was their daughter.

His political activities led him to be elected several times to the parliament, for the Young Finnish Party and for the National Coalition Party. For a brief period at the end of World War I, he served as acting head of state as the Chairman of the Senate. It has been said that the wording of the Finnish Declaration of Independence largely bears his signature. Later Setälä held cabinet posts such as the minister of education (1925) and the Foreign Minister (1925–1926).

He was the Envoy of Finland to Denmark and Hungary from 1927 to 1930.

From 1926 to 1935 he was Chancellor of the University of Turku.

Setälä died on 8 February 1935 on a train between Helsinki and Järvenpää. Thousands of residents from the Tuusula area accompanied him on his final journey to Helsinki, where he was accorded a state funeral.

He is buried in the Hietaniemi Cemetery in Helsinki.

Political offices
Preceded by Gustaf Idman	Foreign Minister of Finland; 1925–1926	Succeeded by Väinö Voionmaa
