= Kaarle Krohn =

Finnish folklorist (1863–1933)

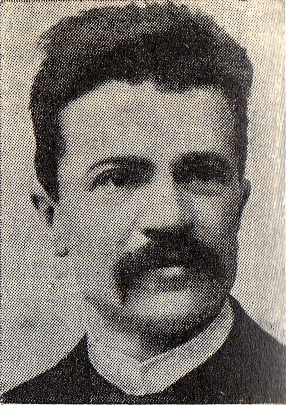
- Born: 10 May 1863; Helsinki, Grand Duchy of Finland, Russian Empire
- Died: 19 July 1933 (aged 70)

Academic background
- Education: University of Helsinki
- Influences: Julius Krohn, Elias Lönnrot

Academic work
- School or tradition: Fennoman
- Main interests: Finnish mythology, Kalevala scholarship

Kaarle Krohn (10 May 1863 – 19 July 1933) was a Finnish folklorist, professor and developer of the geographic-historic method of folklore research. He was born into the influential Krohn family of Helsinki. Krohn is best known outside of Finland for his contributions to international folktale research. He devoted most of his life to the study of the epic poetry that forms the basis for the Finnish national epic, the Kalevala.

== Early life ==
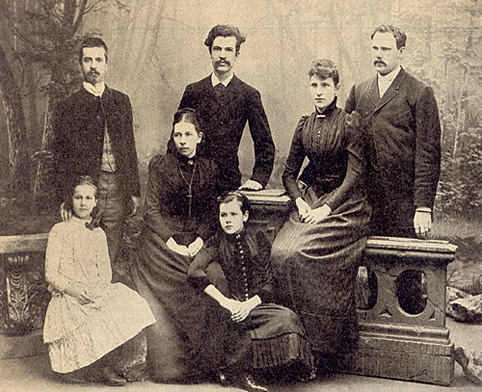
Back row from left Ilmari Krohn, Kaarle Krohn, Helmi with E.N. Setälä; in front Aune Krohn, Helena née Cleve and Aino

Krohn was born in Helsinki. He was the son of journalist and poet Julius Krohn, and his sisters were Finnish authors Aune, Helmi and Aino Kallas. Krohn is best known outside of Finland for his contributions to international folktale research.

Krohn passed his matriculation exams in 1880, earned his candidacy degree in 1883 at University of Helsinki, and completed his doctorate in 1888. At the age of 18, he conducted field research in northern Karelia. From January 1884 to June 1885, he traveled through Finland collecting samples of Finnish folklore. During his collecting, he focused mainly on folktales because he thought they had been overlooked in the search for epic songs. His doctoral thesis, "Bär (Wolf) und Fuchs, eine nordische Tiermärchenkette [Bear (wolf) and fox: A Nordic animal-tale chain (1888)", based on his folktale collection and using his father's historical-geographical method, won him an immediate international reputation and brought him fast academic advancement.

== Career ==
In 1888, he was named docent of Finnish and comparative literature at University of Helsinki. In 1889, he was named acting professor of Finnish and Finnish literature and in 1898, extraordinary personal professor of Finnish and comparative folklore. In 1898, Krohn became a full professor at the University of Helsinki for Finnish and comparative folklore. In 1908, when a permanent chair in Finnish and comparative folklore was established, he became its first occupant. In 1907, he created the Federation of Folklore Fellows' Communications with his friends Johannes Bolte and Axel Olrik. In 1917, he became chairman of the Finnish Literature Society (Suomalaisen Kirjallisuuden Seura). Krohn was a co-founder of the magazines Virittäjä (1896) and Finnisch-ugrische Forschungen together with Emil Nestor Setälä (1901). He was also famous for his 'historical-geographical' approach to comparing folklore texts.

In 1918, Krohn published Kalevalankysymyksiä ('Kalevala Questions'), a two-volume handbook designed for students of Finnish folk poetry. In Kalevala Questions Krohn completely reworked his position on the historicity of the Kalevala. Krohn had previously argued that the Kalevala evolved from small "poetic germ cells" that merged to form a heroic epic. In Kalevala Questions he instead took the position that the poems were born as complete works, and had fragmented over time. Krohn argued that the poems were composed at the same time as the Scandinavian Viking Age, and were accounts of real historical events. This was in stark contrast to his previous view of the Kalevala as a work of Medieval origin that borrowed significantly from hagiography. While Krohn attributed his change in opinion to his further analysis of "observed facts," he also admitted the influence of the political climate that had emerged following Russification and the Finnish Declaration of Independence. Writing for the nationalist paper Uusi Suomi in defense of his new position, Krohn stated that "The formerly peaceful nation of Finland has become militaristic [...] Kalevala scholarship has followed the same road." Eight years later, he reworked the book for a foreign audience, added folktale examples and published it as Die folkloristische Arbeitsmethode ('Folklore Methodology'), which since that time has served as the standard reference work for the Finnish Method.

In 1932, a year before he died, Krohn returned once more to folklore research. He published Übersicht über einige Resultate der Märchenforschung ('A Review of Some Results of Folktale Research'), a review of international folktale scholarship that was based largely on the methodological approach he had developed.

== Publications ==
Eliel Aspelin-Haapkylä als Urheber der neueren volkskundlichen Sammelarbeit der Finnischen Litteraturgesellschaft. Helsinki 1920 (Folklore Fellows' Communications 35).
K. F. Karjalainen. Helsinki 1921 (Folklore Fellows' Communications 40)
Magische Ursprungsrunen der Finnen (Magic Runes of the Finns). Painettu Keravalla 1924 (Folklore Fellows' Communications 52).
Die folkloristische Arbeitsmethode (The Folklorist Work Method). Erläutert von Kaarle Krohn. Oslo 1926.
Übersicht über einige Resultate der Märchenforschung (Overview of the Results of Fairy-Tale Research). Helsinki 1931 (Folklore Fellows' Communications 96).
Antti Aarne. Helsinki 1926 (Folklore Fellows' Communications 64).
