= Kalulu =

Adopted child of Henry Morton Stanley (c.1865–1877)

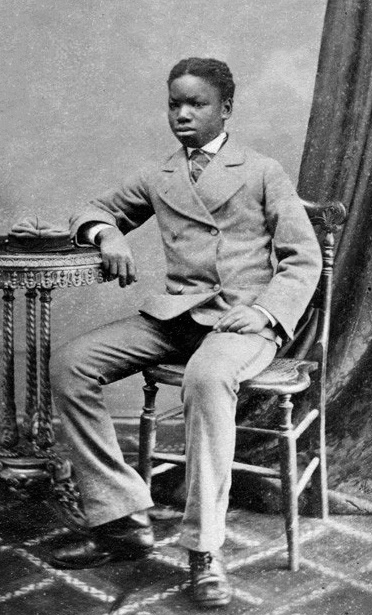
- Born: Ndugu M’Hali c. 1865; Africa
- Died: 28 March 1877 (aged 12); Kalulu Falls on the Lualaba river
- Cause of death: Drowning
- Other name: The African Stephen Walker
- Education: Briefly at Wandsworth
- Known for: Adopted by Henry Morton Stanley

Ndugu M’Hali or Kalulu (c. 1865 – 28 March 1877) was an African slave and adopted child of the explorer and journalist Henry Morton Stanley. Although Kalulu died young, in his short life he visited Europe, America and the Seychelles. He had a book dedicated to him, a model in Madame Tussauds, and was a guest at David Livingstone's funeral.

== Biography ==
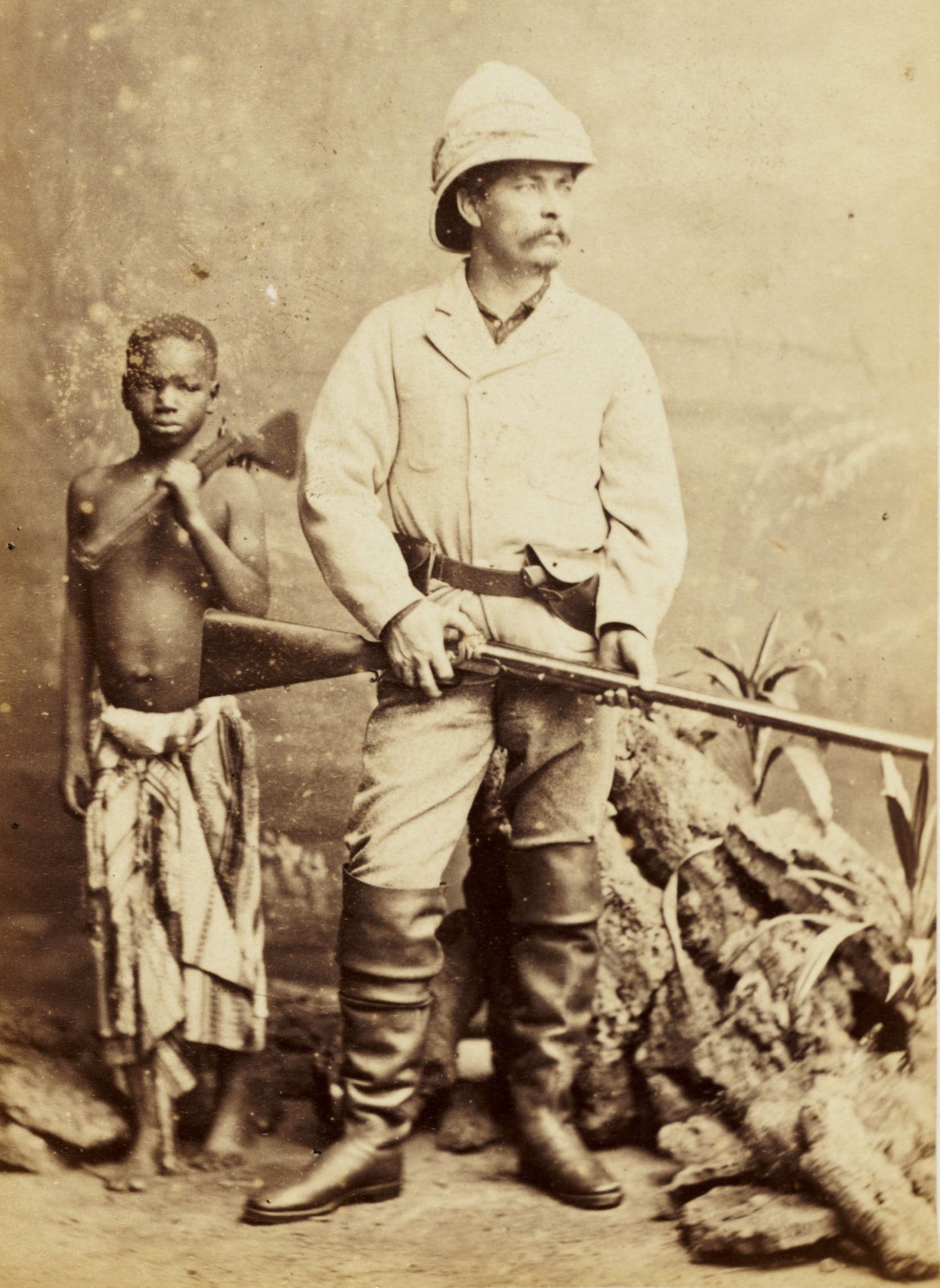
A studio picture of Kalulu and Stanley now in the Smithsonian Institution. Henry Morton Stanley was the adopted name of John Rowlands from North Wales. Stanley became famous for saying, "Dr. Livingstone, I presume."

Kalulu was born in Africa and became Henry Morton Stanley's favourite after being given to him at Tabora in Tanzania. Kalulu was freed but was renamed by Stanley. His original name was "Ndugu M’Hali", which meant "My friend's brother". Stanley disliked the name, calling him instead "Kalulu", the Swahili word for rabbit.

After Stanley found Livingstone, he returned to England and decided to take Kalulu with him. He was Stanley's constant companion, and Stanley would record his reactions to new things. He commented on how good he was after drinking wine and upset after trying mustard. Stanley went on a lecture tour to America and to Paris, and Kalulu went with him. At one point they were delayed in the Seychelles, and whilst there and in London, Stanley had his photograph taken with Kalulu in the background. Moreover, Stanley wrote and published a book called Kalulu, Prince, King and slave in 1873. The book has been called a homosexual love story, and it describes a growing friendship between a character called Kalulu (an "Apollo"), who is older than the real Kalulu and another boy called "Selim" (Stanley's translator in Africa was called Selim).

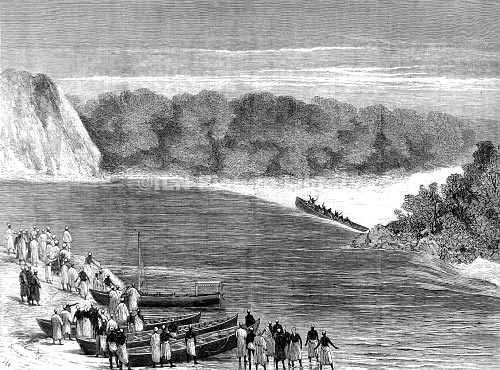
Death of Kalulu, a contemporary engraving

Kalulu dined with members of society but often felt he was being humiliated as a result of a previous racist encounter. It was only when introduced to Lord Freeth that he really started to flourish in western society. Stanley said of Kalulu that he had "taken him to England and the United States, and whom I had placed in an English school for eighteen months."

Stanley was sent back to Africa under a mission supported by The Daily Telegraph in London and the New York Herald as an "ambassador of two great powers". He was to take with him an “army of peace and light,” and this included his protégé Kalulu. Stanley was to map central Africa and report on suspected slave traders, whom Stanley had lectured against whilst in England.

Kalulu died in "Kalulu Falls" (part of the Livingstone Falls on the Congo River), when one of the expedition's canoes was taken over the waterfall. He and four others were killed. After learning of the tragedy, Stanley vowed to rid the empire of its only remaining slave master, the one they called "Marsh". It was his last request to have the Livingstone Falls renamed after Kalulu. Unlike many new names that Stanley gave to places, the title of Kalulu Falls stuck.
