= Gudrun Bojesen =

Danish ballet dancer

Gudrun Bojesen (born 2 February 1976) is a Danish ballet dancer. Since 2001, she has been a principal dancer with the Royal Danish Ballet.

== Early life ==
Born in Copenhagen, Bojesen grew up in the well-to-do district to the north of Sortedam Lake. Through her mother, she is related to Edel Petersen who is remembered for her interpretations and support of August Bournonville's ballets. She studied at the Royal Danish Ballet School from 1984, graduating in 1992. In addition to ballet, she has also studied Spanish, English and Italian.

== Career ==
Considered to be the Royal Ballet's leading classical ballerina, Bojesen joined the troupe in 1992, becoming a soloist in 2000 and a principal dancer in 2001. Known for her technique and radiance, she has been acclaimed for her roles in Bournonville's ballets, for example as Hilda in A Folk Tale. Together with her partner Thomas Lund, she starred in the 2005 Bournonville festival. Her pas de deux in The Nutcracker and her passionately presented Tatiana in John Cranko's Onegin have also impressed. Other leading roles have included Marguerite in Lady of the Camellias, Odette/Odile in Swan Lake, and the title roles in Giselle, The Tin Soldier and Tarantella. More recently she has danced Nikija in a new staging of La Bayadère by Nikolaj Hübbe.

Bojesen has also performed modern dance with the Copenhagen International Ballet at Bellevue Teatret.

== Awards ==
Gudrun Bojesen has received several awards including:

- 1999: Bournonville Award.
- 2001: Premio Positano
- 2008: Danish Reumert Award for Dancer of the year
- 2013: Nominated for Benois de la Danse
