= Krohn =

Origin
- Origin: German
- Meaning: Middle High German word "kran" or "kron"; crane
- Region of origin: Schleswig-Holstein

Krohn is the surname of several people:

- Aino Krohn, a Finnish author better known as Aino Kallas
- August David Krohn, a Russian zoologist
- Chester A. Krohn, American politician
- Christine Krohn, a German Federal Court Justice
- Felix Krohn, Finnish composer, son of Ilmari
- Helmi Krohn, a Finnish editor and writer
- Henrik Krohn (1826–1879) Norwegian poet, magazine editor and proponent for Nynorsk language
- Ilmari Krohn, Finnish composer and musicologist, son of Julius
- Irina Krohn, a Finnish member of Parliament
- Jasmin Krohn (b. 1966), Swedish speed skater
- Jonathan Krohn, American journalist and writer
- Julius Krohn, nephew of August, fennoman and folklorist
- Kaarle Krohn, Finnish folklorist, son of Julius
- Katherine Elizabeth Krohn, German-born American author
- Kenneth Krohn, co-developer of the Krohn–Rhodes theory
- Kristin Krohn Devold, a Norwegian politician
- Lars Monrad-Krohn, a Norwegian engineer
- Leena Krohn, a Finnish author
- Michael Krohn
- Michael Krohn-Dehli (b. 1983), Danish footballer
- Michael Krohn (musician), a Norwegian musician
- Paysach Krohn, rabbi
- Ramble John Krohn, an American hip hop producer also known as RJD2
- Rebecca Krohn, American ballet dancer
- Stuart Krohn (born 1962), American professional rugby union player
- Tim Krohn, recipient of the 1994 Conrad-Ferdinand-Meyer-Preis
- Tracy Krohn, owner of Krohn Racing/TRG
- Juan María Fernández y Krohn, Catholic priest, would-be assassin of Pope John Paul II

== See also ==
- Krohn Conservatory, Cincinnati, Ohio, US
- Crohn's disease
- Kron (disambiguation)
