= Christen Købke =

Danish painter

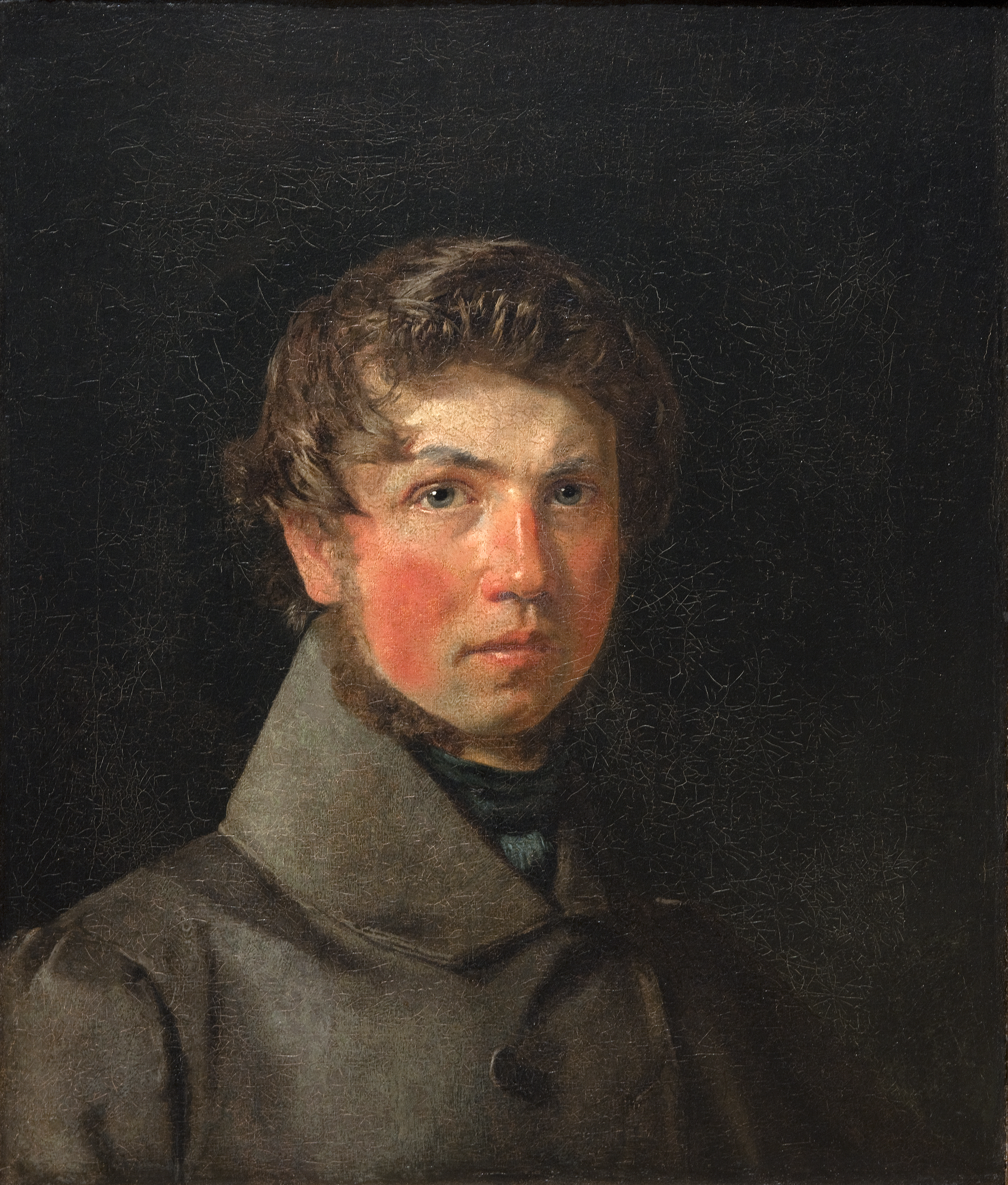
- Self portrait, oil on canvas, circa 1833
- Born: 26 May 1810; Copenhagen, Denmark
- Died: 7 February 1848 (aged 37); Copenhagen, Denmark
- Education: Royal Danish Academy of Fine Arts
- Known for: Painting
- Movement: Danish Golden Age, Romanticism

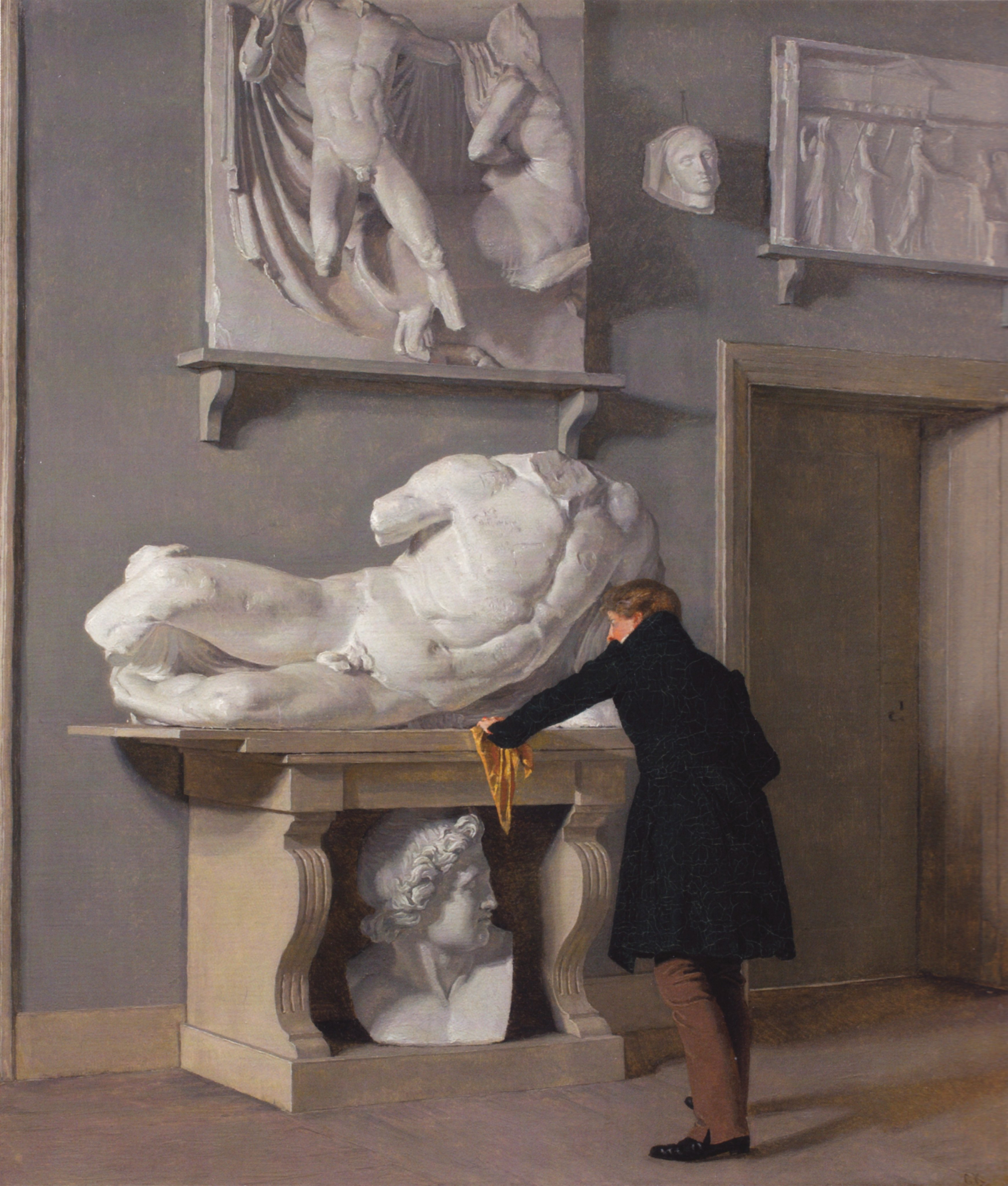
View of the Plaster Cast Collection at Charlottenborg Palace (1830)

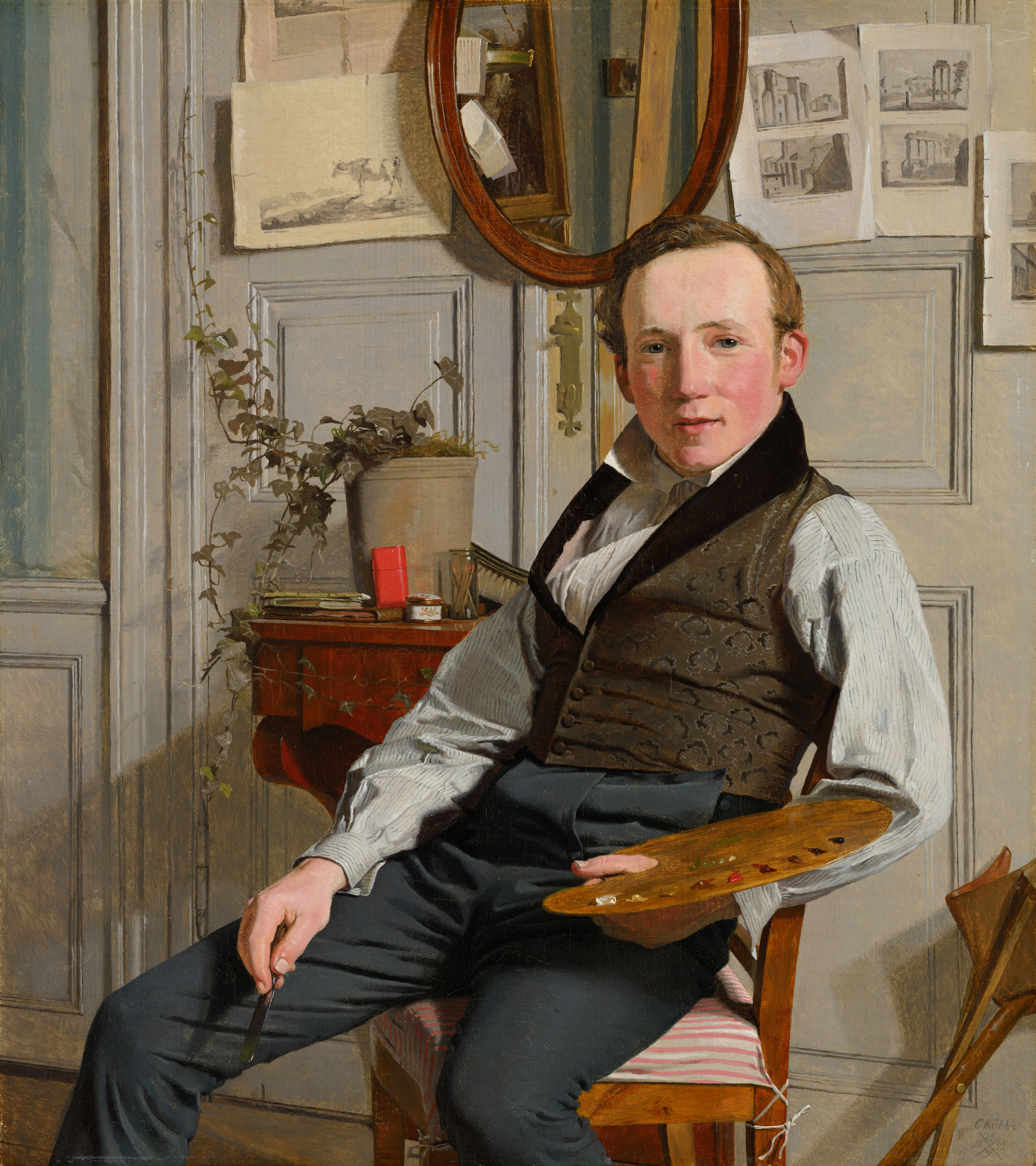
Portrait of Frederik Hansen Sødring (1832)

Christen Schiellerup Købke (26 May 1810 – 7 February 1848) was a Danish painter, and one of the best-known artists from the Golden Age of Danish Painting.

== Childhood and early training ==
He was born in Copenhagen, Denmark. He was one of 11 children born to Peter Berend Købke (1771–1843) and Cecilie Margrethe Petersen (1778–1867). In 1815 the family moved to Kastellet, a military fortification area in Copenhagen, where his father was head baker. At the age of 11 he suffered from a bout of rheumatic fever. He made many drawings during his convalescence and decided that he would become an artist.

In 1822 at 12 years of age he started his studies at Royal Danish Academy of Art (Det Kongelige Danske Kunstakademi). He studied first in the drawing class of Christian August Lorentzen (1749–1828) and finally 4 years under Christoffer Wilhelm Eckersberg (1783–1853) after Lorentzen's death in 1828. Eckersberg stressed observance of nature, and Købke's talent grew under Eckersberg's disciplined training. Eckersberg's influence is readily seen in Købke's first mature work "Parti af Århus Domkirke" painted in 1829. The painting was purchased by the Art Union (Kunstforening) and is now in the collection of the National Art Museum (Statens Museum for Kunst). He received the academy's small silver medallion in 1831 and a large silver medallion in 1833.

== Early career ==
He lived in Kastellet until 1833 and made many paintings of the area. His painting "Gården ved bageriet i Kastellet" (ca. 1832) hangs in the Ny Carlsberg Glyptotek museum in Copenhagen.

In 1832 he shared a studio with his friend, landscape painter Frederik Hansen Sødring (1809–1862). He painted a portrait of Sødring which now hangs in the Hirschsprung Collection. In 1834 he moved, along with his parents, outside of Copenhagen's fortifications near Sortedam Lake (Sortedamssøen). He painted many views overlooking the lake towards the city and the embankments surrounding the city. His work became larger, more monumental.

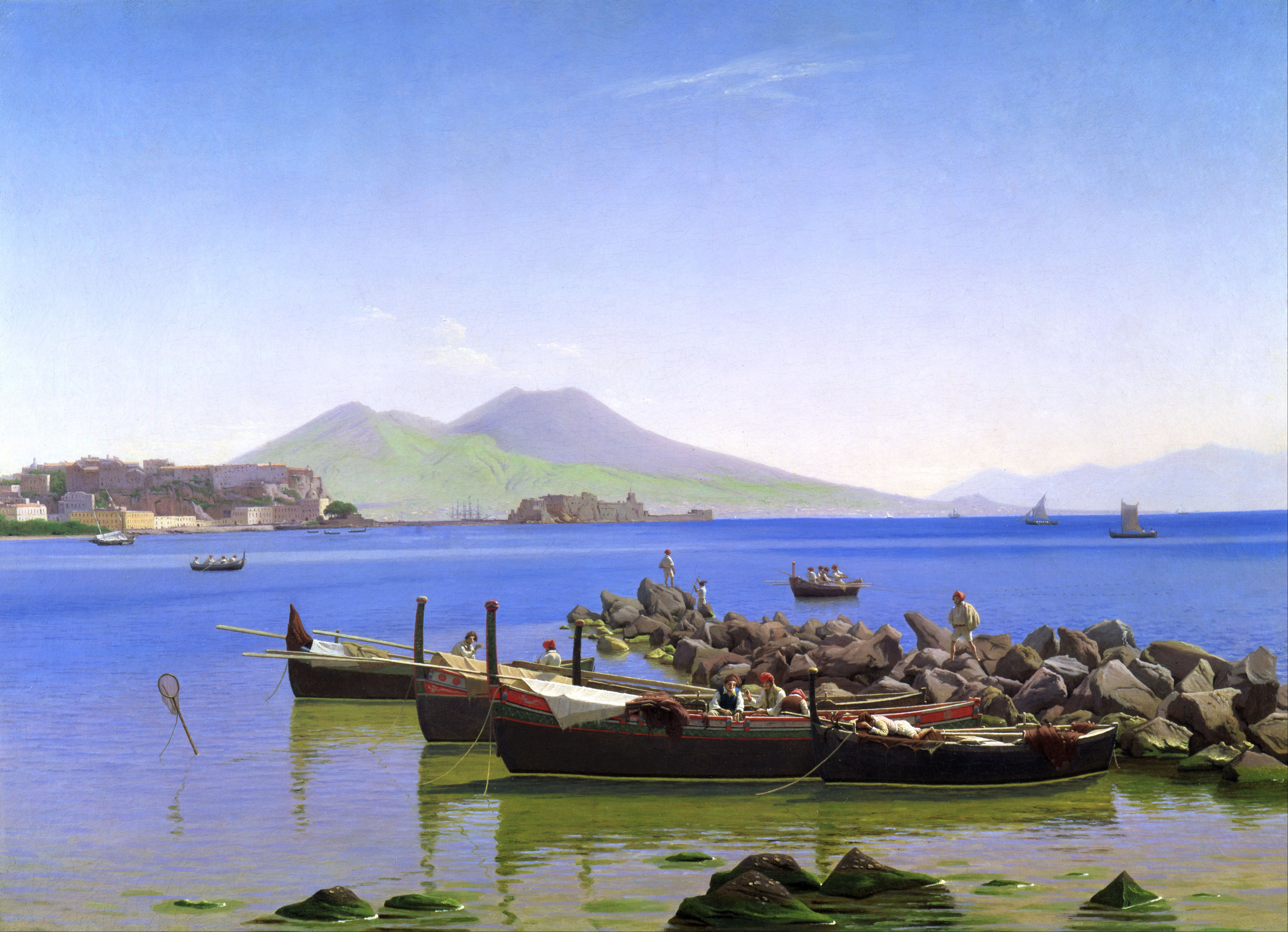
Bay of Naples (1843)

Like many of his contemporary artists he came under the influence of art historian Niels Lauritz Høyen (1798–1870), who promoted a nationalistic art. Høyen called for artists to search for subject matter in the folk life of their country instead of searching for themes in other lands, such as Italy (which was at that time considered a requirement for an artist's training). On a visit to Hillerød in 1835 he painted a romantic picture of Frederiksborg Palace, Frederiksborg Slot ved Aftenbelysning (1835).

At the end of 1837 he married Susanna Cecilie Krohn (1810–1849), and shortly afterwards painted a portrait of his young bride.

== Travel to Italy ==
In 1838 he received a travel stipend from the academy, left his new wife and traveled via Dresden and Munich to Italy accompanied by decorative painter Georg Hilker (1807–1875). They arrived in Rome by year's end where he met his brother-in-law, sculptor and medallionist, Frederik Christopher Krohn (1806–1883) and many other Danish artists. He traveled, along with Constantin Hansen (1804–1880) the following summer to Naples, Sorrento, Pompeii and Capri where he painted in the open air.

== Return to Denmark ==
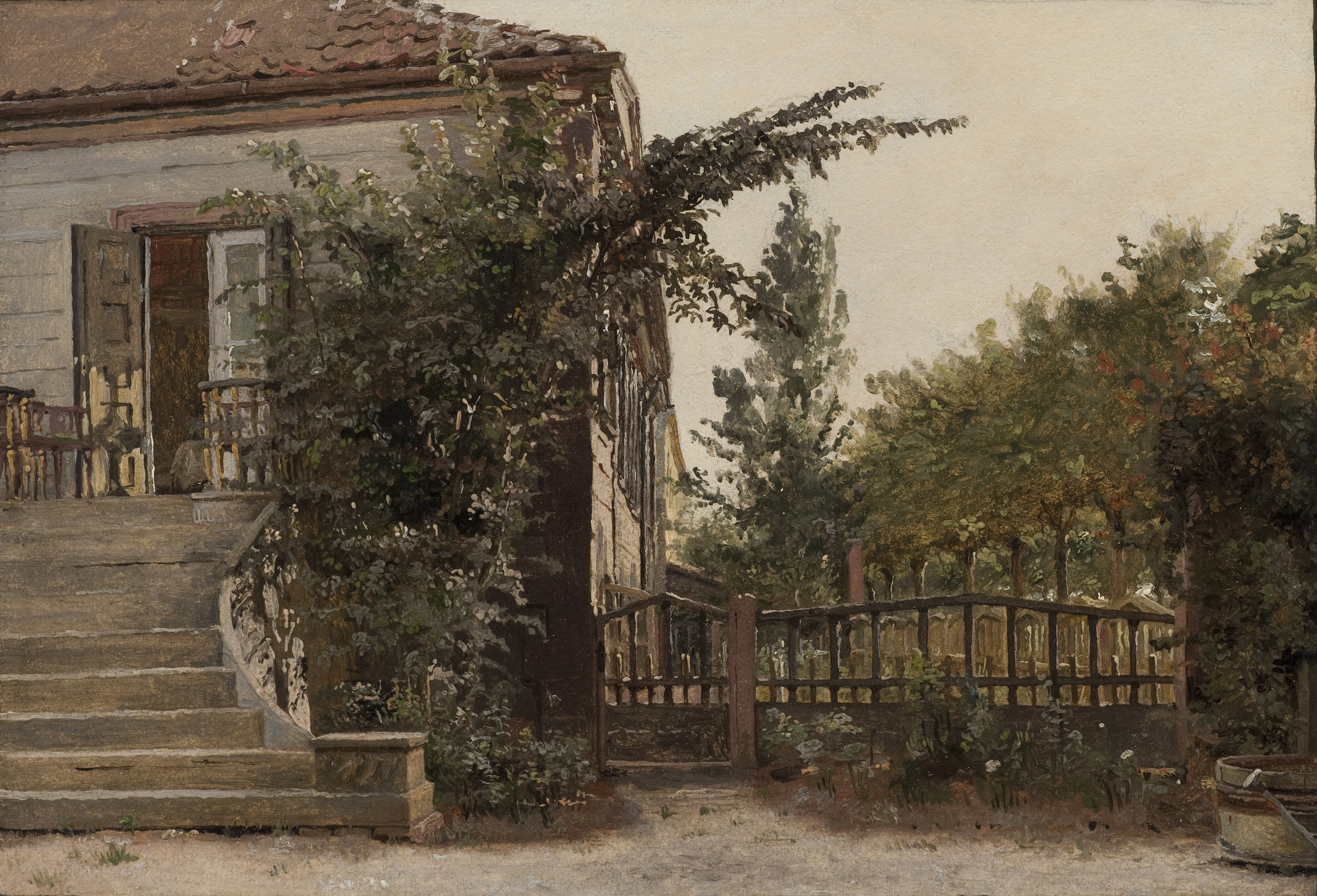
Havetrappen ved kunstnerens malestue på Blegdammen (c.1845), a depiction of the artist's studio in Copenhagen.

He returned home in 1840 with a large collection of sketches for later use and inspiration. Unfortunately, most of his later work with these Italian themes was uninspired, and they found little favor. Købke even considered at the time becoming a decorator, having participated in 1844–1845 in the decoration of the Thorvaldsen Museum in Copenhagen, which is dedicated to the artistic works of neo-classicistical sculptor Bertel Thorvaldsen (1770–1844).

Two years after his father died in 1843, the family sold the property outside Copenhagen, and Købke moved back into the city. His application for admission to the academy, which was accompanied by one of his failed Italian landscapes, was rejected in 1846. He died in 1848 of pneumonia, and is buried in Assistens Kirkegård.

== Aftermath ==
Købke, a national romantic, painted portraits, landscapes and architectural paintings. Most of Købke's portraits show friends, family members and fellow artists. He found most of his motifs in his immediate surroundings. Now he is recognized internationally for his well composed and harmonic paintings, for their coloristic qualities and for his sense of the everyday life. But in his lifetime he was almost forgotten, especially because of his early death and limited production. Despite his talent and the praise of various contemporaries, Købke had never been inundated with commissions.

Købke is recognized today as one of the most talented painters of Denmark's Golden Age and a renowned Danish painter of his generation. The painterly interpretations he made of his surroundings stand as some of the most notable works of the period.

His works are in the collections of not only Danish museums but also such international museums as the J. Paul Getty Museum and the Scottish National Gallery in Edinburgh.

== Works ==
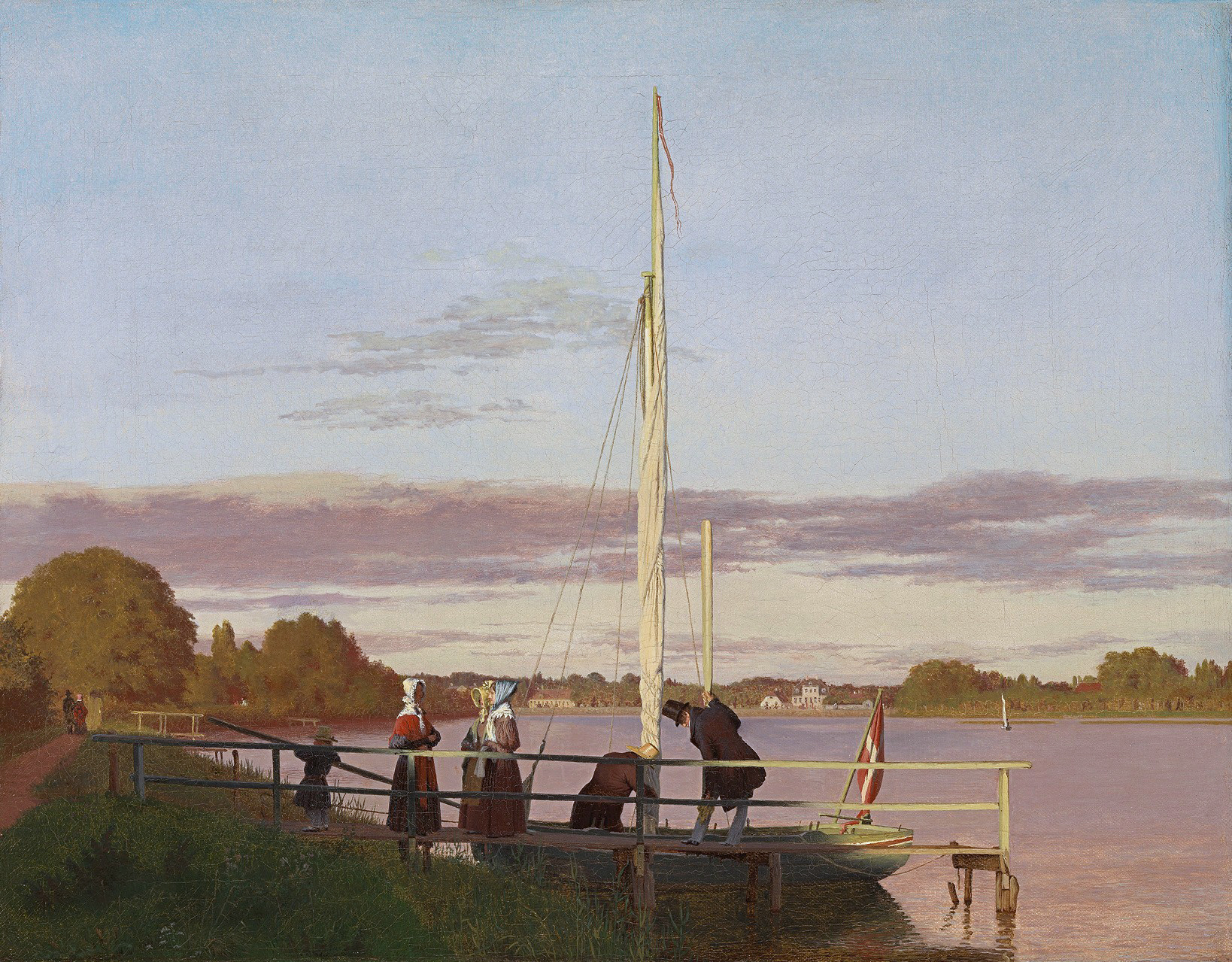
View of Østerbro from Dosseringen (1838)

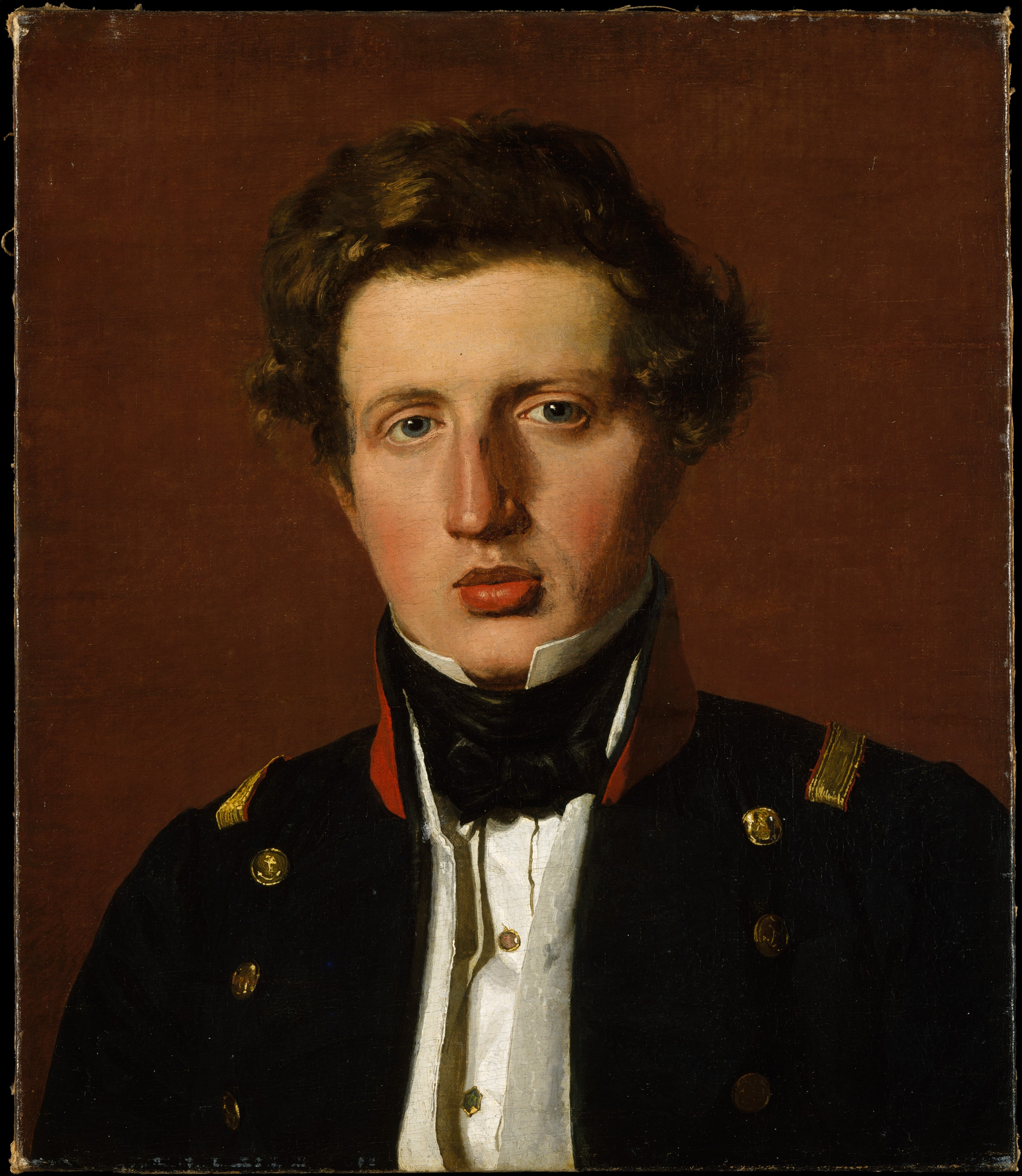
Valdemar Hjartvar Købke (ca. 1838)
Metropolitan Museum of Art

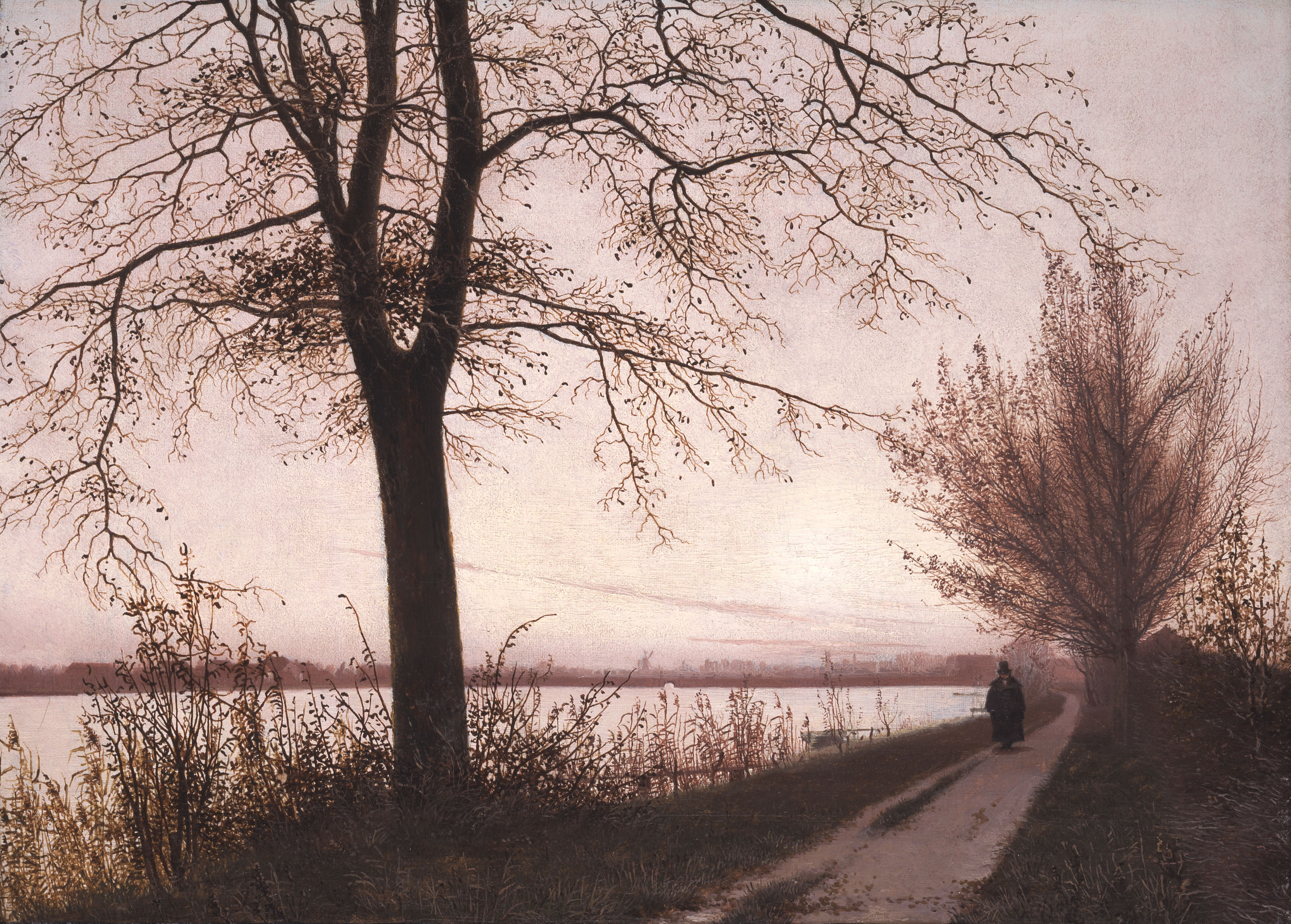
Efterårsmorgen ved Sortedamssøen (1838)
Ny Carlsberg Glyptotek

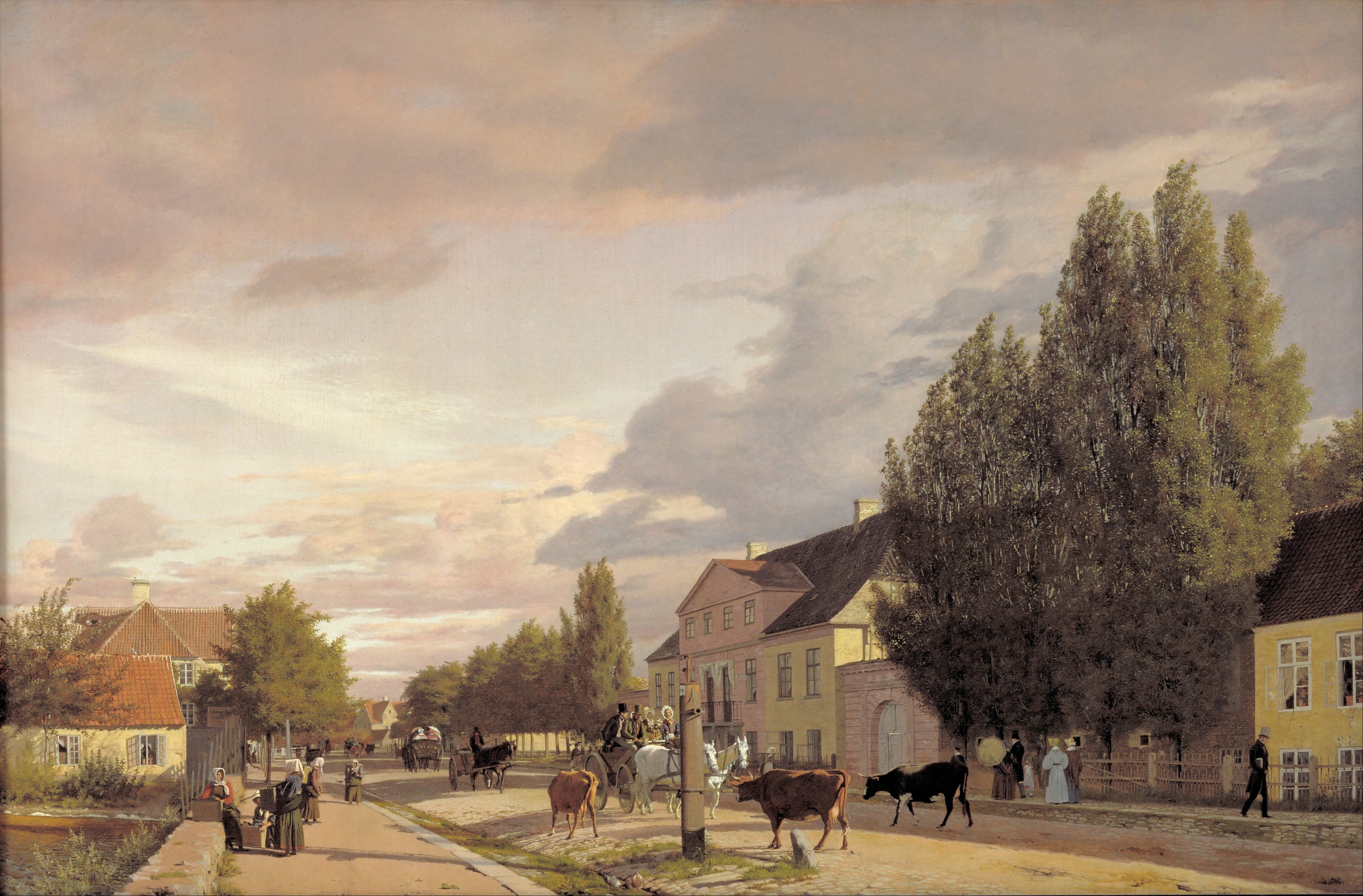
Parti af Østerbro i morgenbelysning (1836)
Statens Museum for Kunst

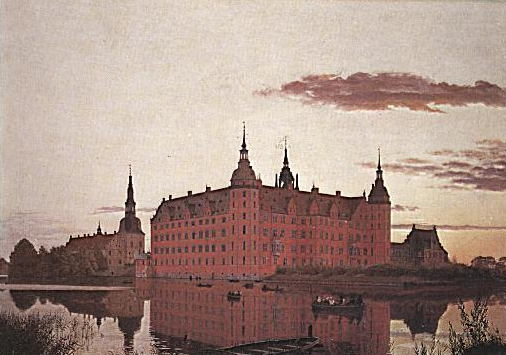
Frederiksborg Slot ved Aftenbelysning (1835)

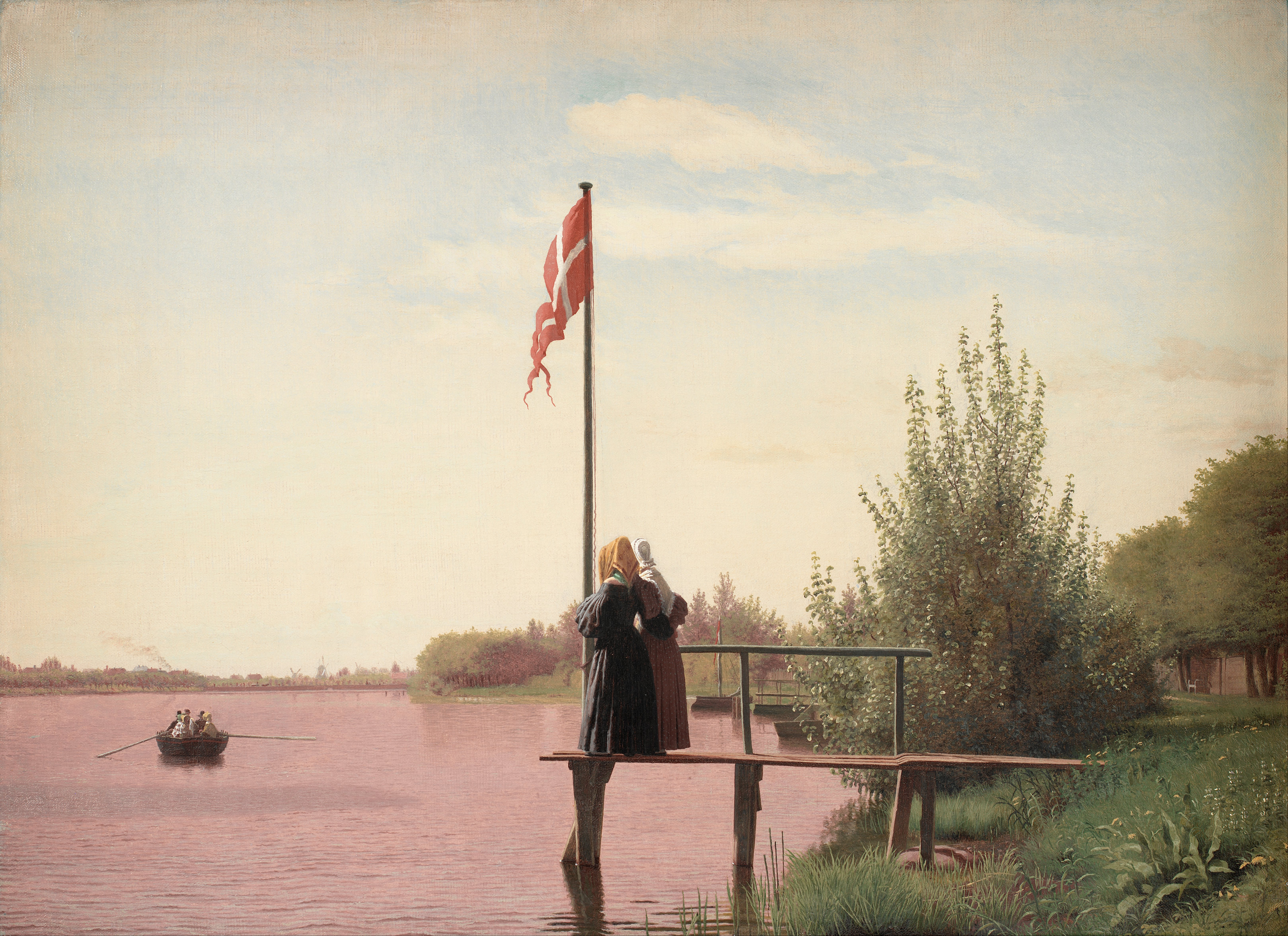
View from Dosseringen near the Sortedam Lake (1838)

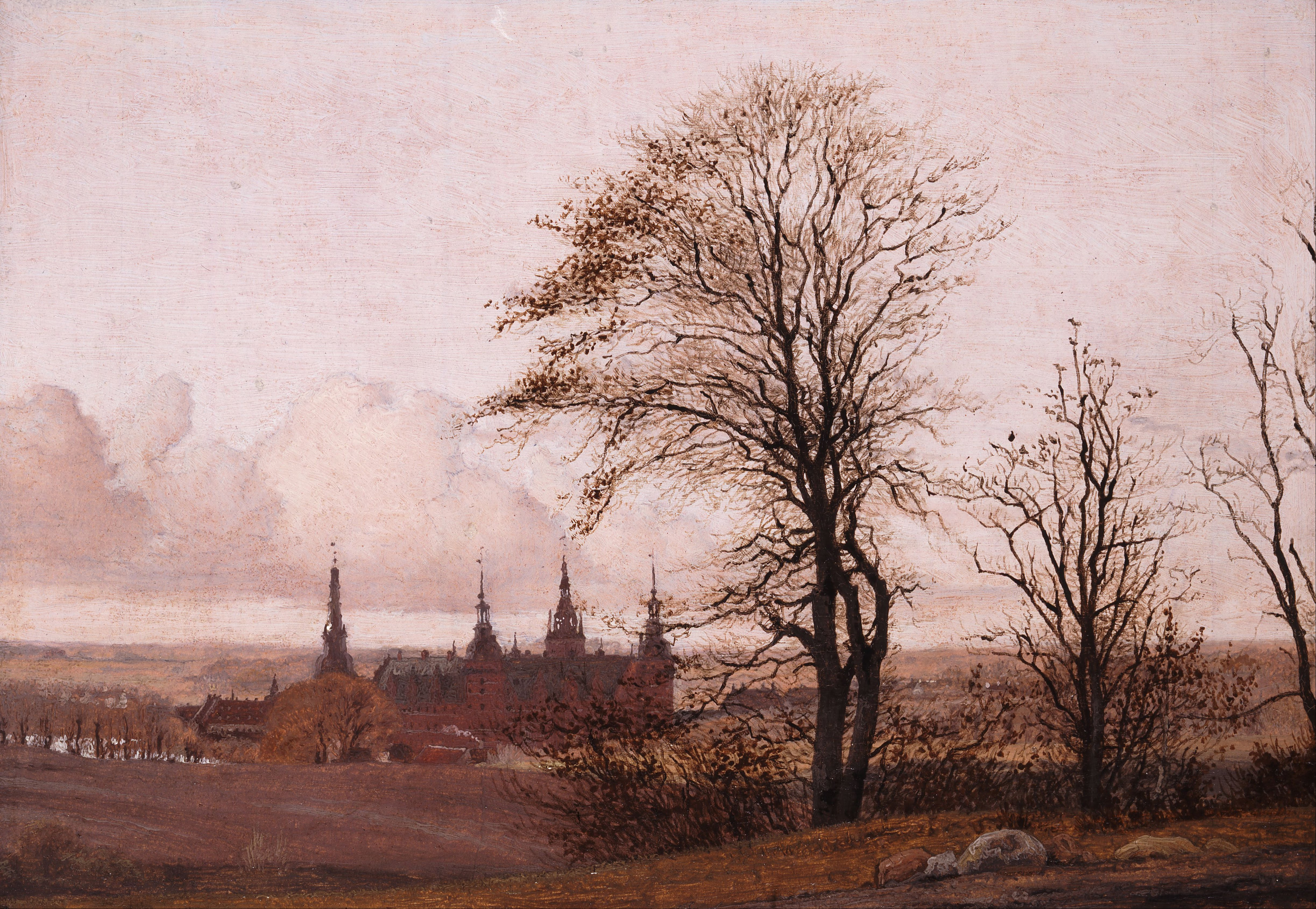
Frederiksborg Castle in the Middle Distance (1837–38)

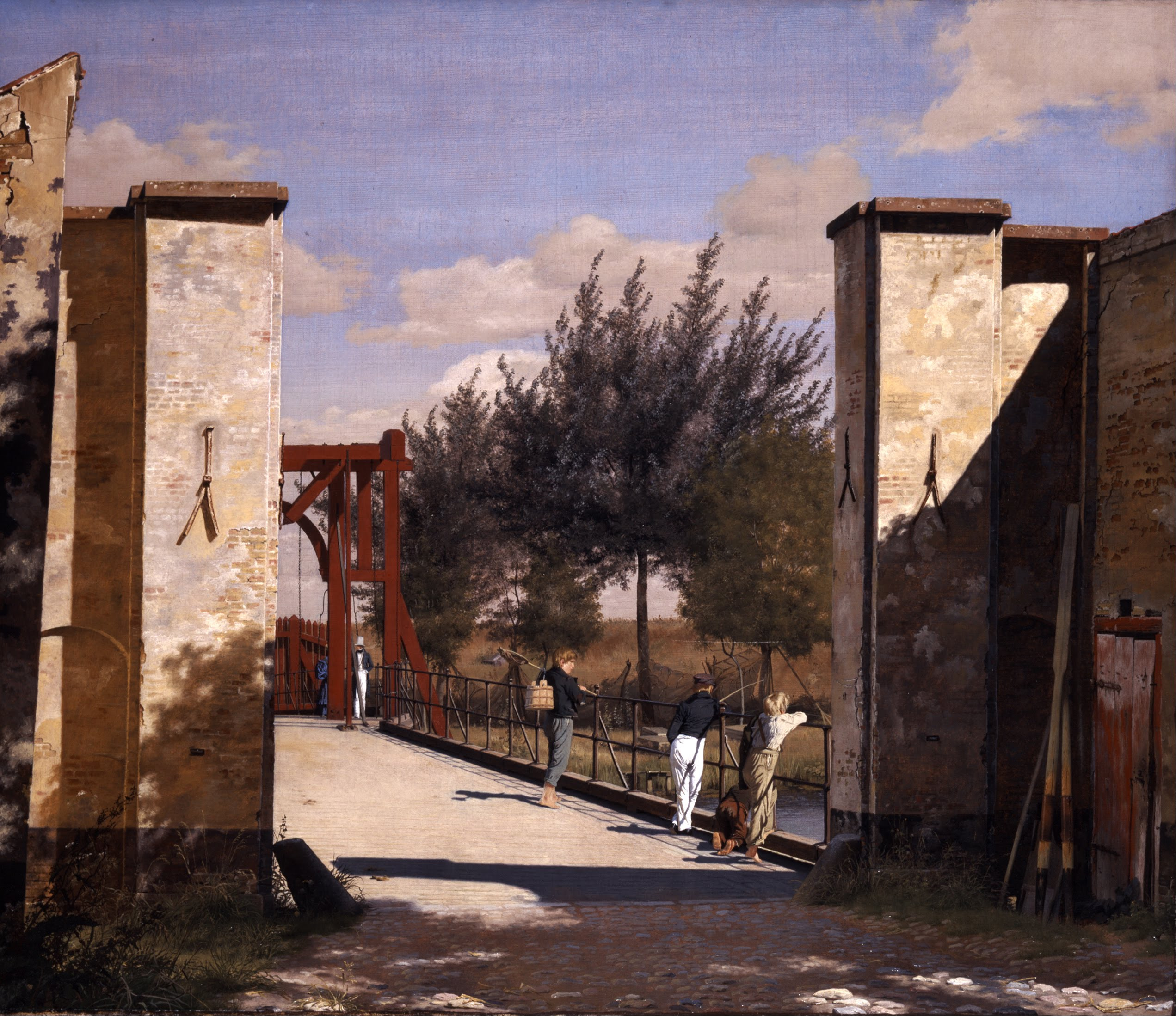
North Gate of the Citadel (1834)

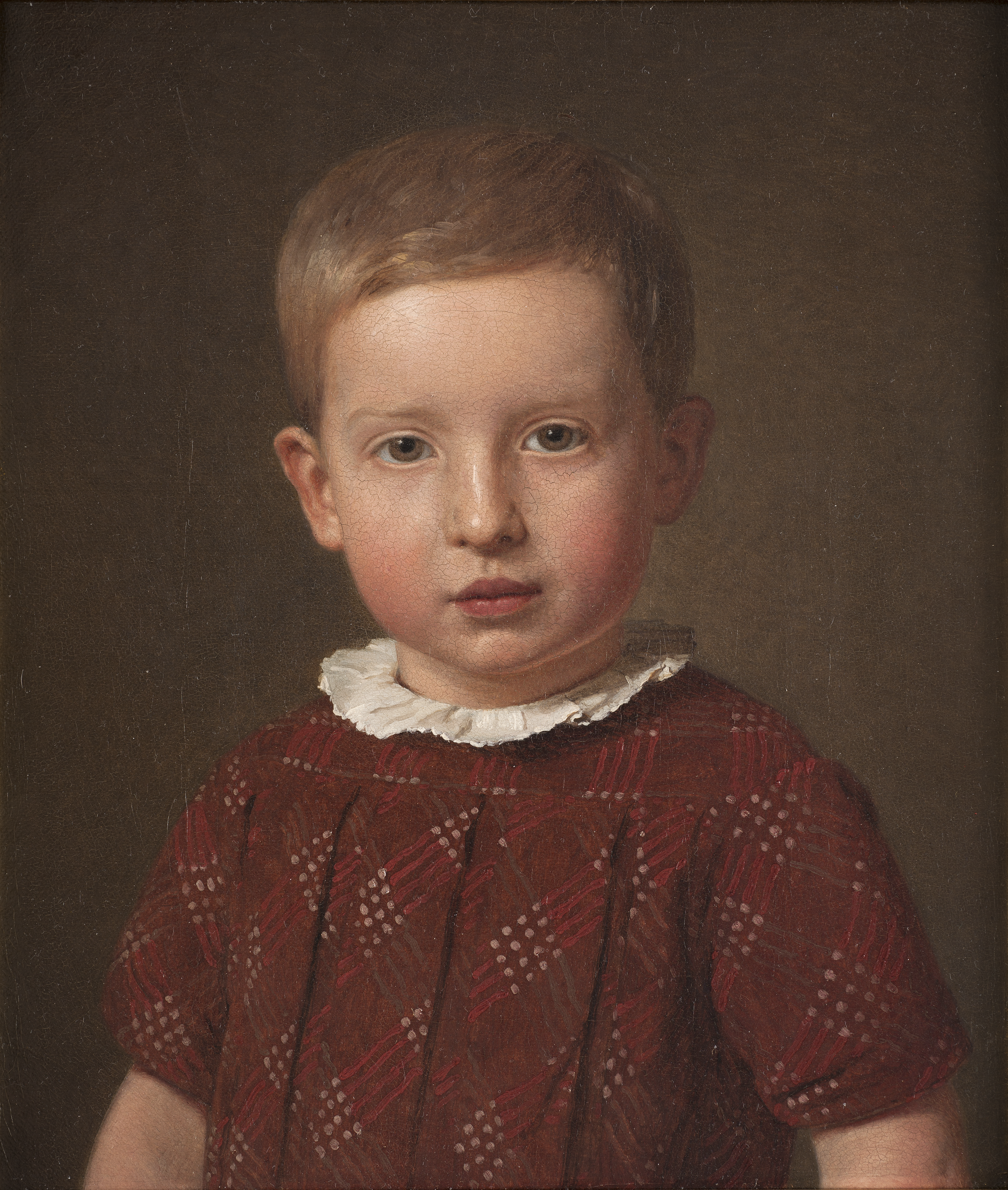
Johan Jacob Krohn, the artist's nephew, as a child (1846) Nationalmuseum

== See also ==
- List of Danish painters
- Art of Denmark
- Efterårsmorgen ved Sortedamssøen

== Other sources ==
- David Jackson; Kasper Monrad (2010) Christen Købke, Danish Master of Light (Yale University Press) ISBN 9780300166637
- Kasper Monrad; Philip Conisbee; Bjarne Jornaes (1993) The Golden Age of Danish Painting (Hudson Hills Press) ISBN 9781555950859
