= Efterårsmorgen ved Sortedamssøen =

Painting by Christen Købke

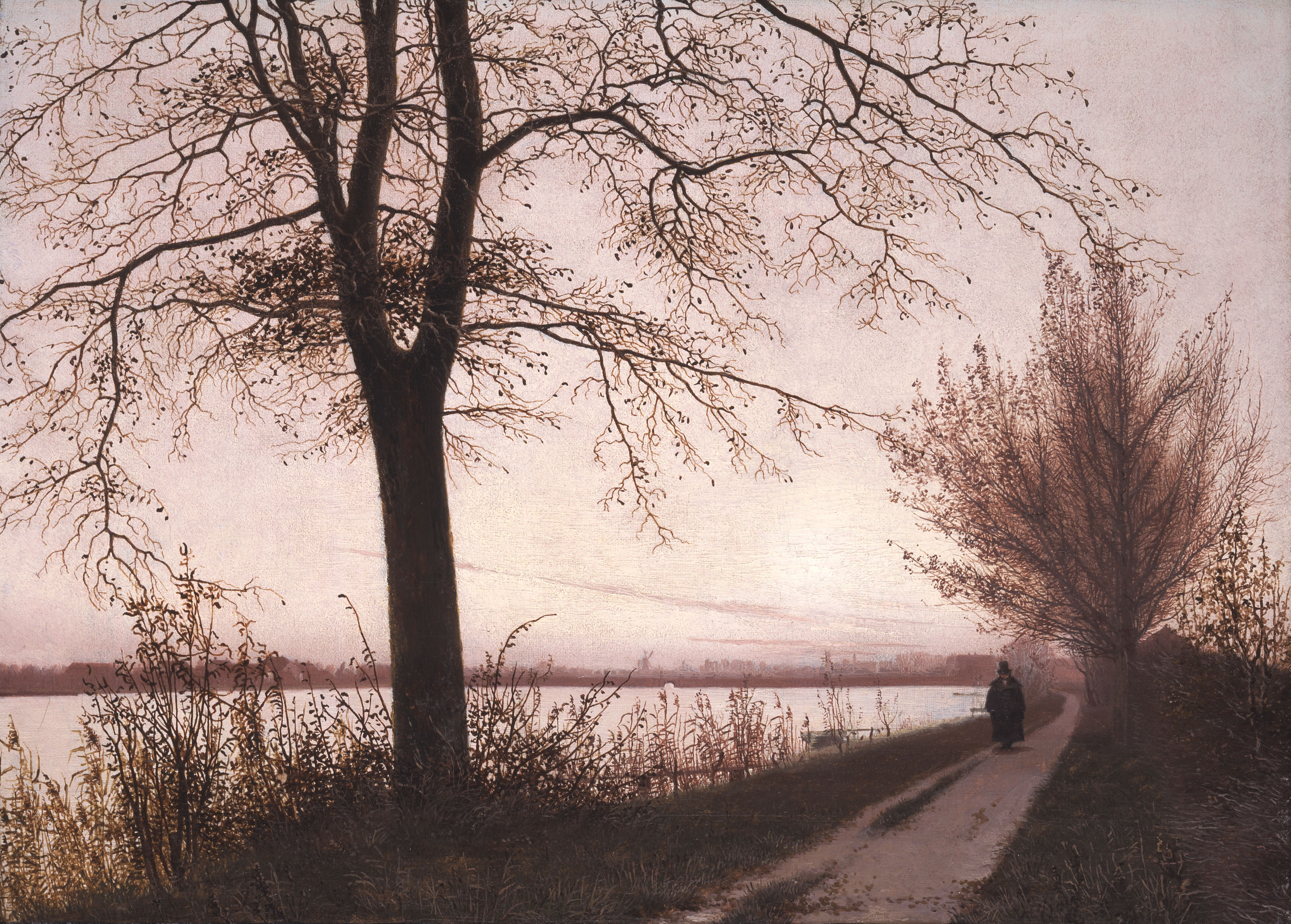
Christen Købke: Efterårsmorgen ved Sortedamssøen (1838)

Efterårsmorgen ved Sortedamssøen (Autumn Morning on Lake Sortedam) is an oil painting by Christen Købke, one of the leading artists in the Golden Age of Danish Painting. Included in the 2006 Danish Culture Canon, the painting hangs in Copenhagen's Ny Carlsberg Glyptotek.

== Background ==
From 1833 to 1843, Købke lived with his parents on Blegdamsvej in Copenhagen in a house close to Sortedam Lake. He also painted several scenes of Blegdam Lake.

== Description ==
With its almost bare trees and pale light, the painting conveys the atmosphere of a November morning. The man, walking alone along the lakeside, adds to the melancholy of the scene. One can almost hear the gentle rustling of the leaves, the man's distant footsteps and the lapping of the water against the reeds. The painting's vertical and horizontal lines provide a fine balance which is typical of Købke's ability to convey a sense of peacefulness in his compositions. His appreciation of colour can be seen in the pale pink morning light.

From his letters, we know that Købke was depressed at the time he painted the scene. That could explain the coolness of the painting which differs strikingly from Købke's other works depicting much more pleasant scenes of spring and summer.
