= Frederik Sødring =

Danish painter

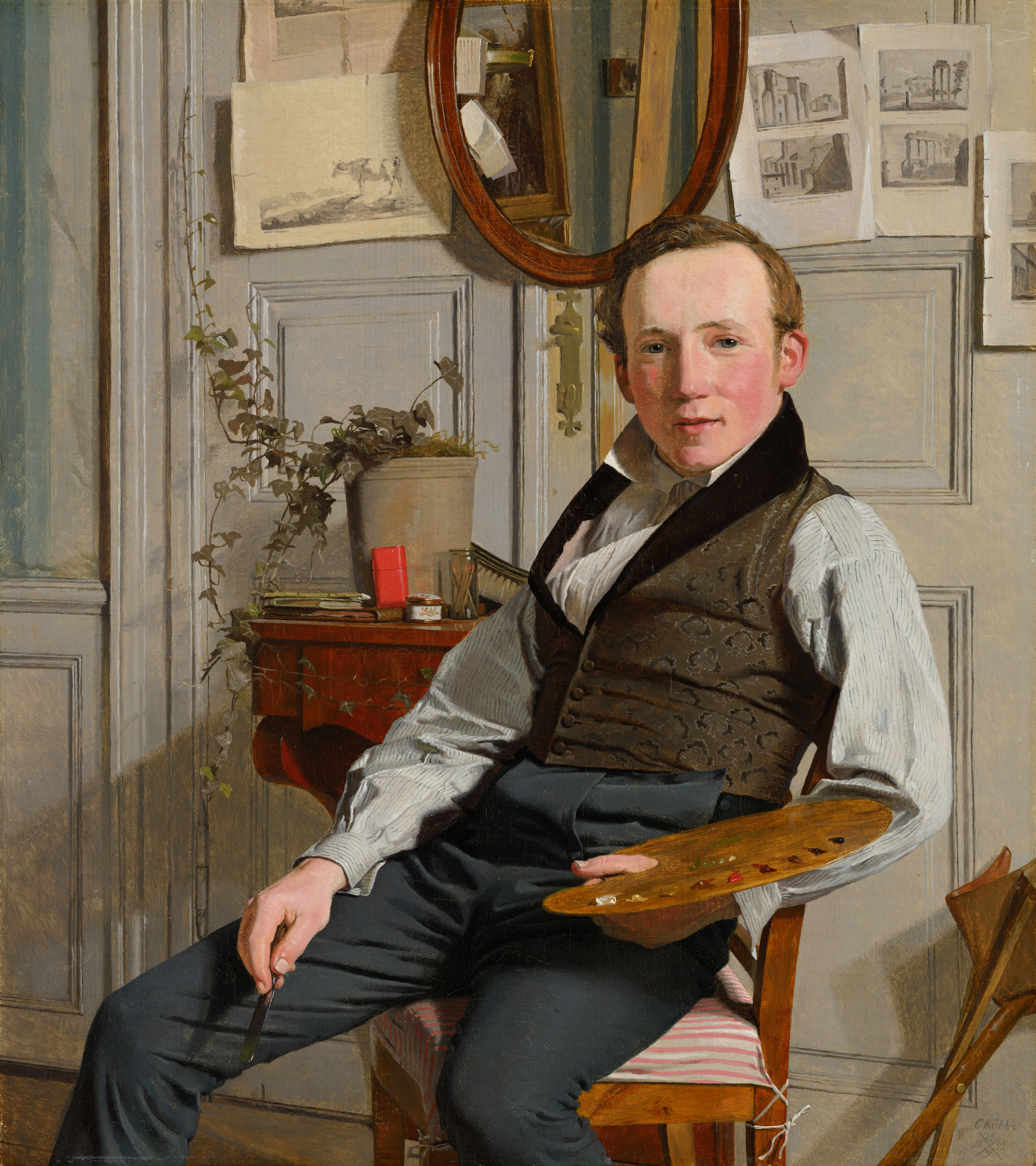
- Portrait of Sødring by Christen Købke
- Born: 31 May 1809; Aalborg, Denmark
- Died: 18 April 1862 (aged 52); Hellerup, Denmark
- Education: Royal Danish Academy of Fine Arts

Frederik Hansen Sødring (31 May 1809 – 18 April 1862) was a Danish landscape painter and founder of an endowment.

== Background ==
Sødring was born in Aalborg, Denmark. He was the son of merchant Peder Hansen Sødring (d. 1839) and Ane Dorthea (née Jepsen; d. 1842). He spent some time living in Norway with his parents before studying at the Royal Danish Academy of Fine Arts in Copenhagen beginning in 1825. There he initially studied under Jens Peter Møller, but his greatest influence was from the romantic art of Johan Christian Dahl.

=== Career ===
Between 1829 and 1831 Sødring travelled to Norway and Germany, taking time to study in Munich. He traveled to Norway and Southern Sweden between 1832–36 and returned during 1847. He was awarded the Fund ad Usus Publicos 1836-38. He travelled to Germany (mainly Munich) 1836-38; Paris 1843.

He continued to work, sending several paintings back to Denmark. These travels influenced Sødring's later works. Upon his return, he continued to paint, exhibiting landscapes from the Rhine, Southern Germany, and Tyrol. In 1832, he was painted by Christen Købke; the portrait is now part of the Hirschsprung Collection.

He exhibited at the Charlottenborg Spring Exhibition 1828-36, 1838–40, 1842–47, 1858. Sødring's other exhibition included at the Salon in Paris and University of Copenhagen both in 1843.

== Personal life ==
In 1842 Sødring wed Henriette Marie de Bang (1809–55), the daughter of Niels de Bang (1776–1815) and Cathrine Amalie Henriette (née Callisen); her family were rich landowners in Næstved. With the marriage Sødring received a sizable dowry. Sødring died in Hellerup, Denmark, on 18 April 1862, aged 52. Upon his death, he bequeathed 30,000 thalers to the Royal Danish Academy of Fine Arts. He also established Sødringske Opmuntringspræmie, a scholarship to be awarded at the annual Charlottenborg Spring Exhibition, and provided funds to support elderly landscape artists and widows of such painters.

== Gallery ==
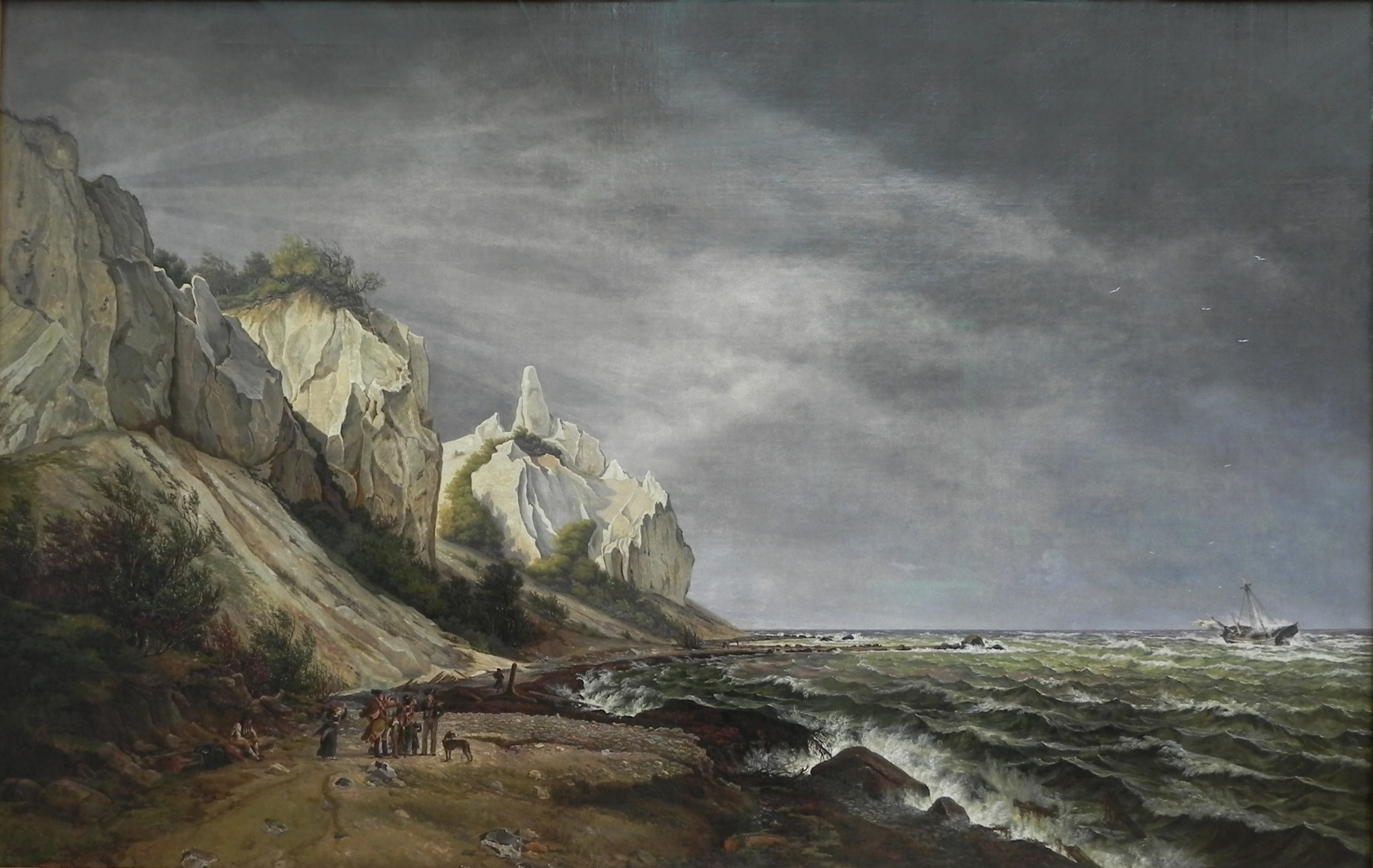
The Chalk Cliffs at Møn (1831)

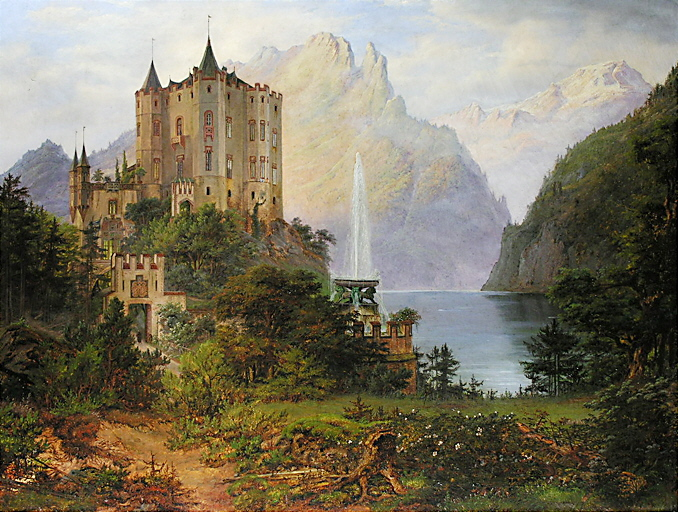
Hohenschwangau (1843)

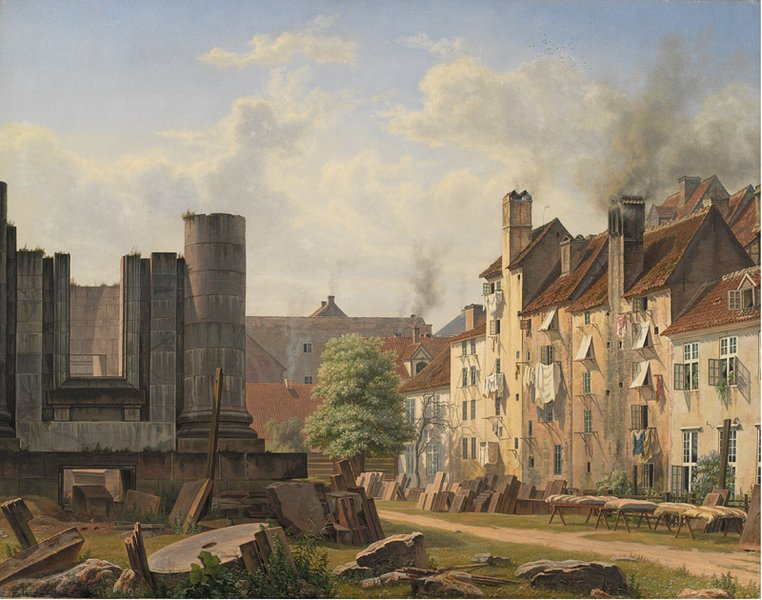
View of the Uncompleted
Frederik's Church (1835)

== Other sources ==
- Frederik Sødring at the Weilbachs Kunstnerleksikon
- Dansk Biografisk Lexikon Vol. XVII, via Project Runeberg
