= Katherine Elizabeth Krohn =

American author (born 1961)

- Born: 1961 (age 64–65); Bitburg, West Germany
- Occupation: Writer

Katherine Elizabeth Krohn (born 1961) is an American author.

Born in Bitburg, Germany to American-born parents. Krohn is a prolific writer of books for children and young adults. Writing for young reader's series such as USA Today Lifeline Biographies and A&E Biography (published by Lerner Publishing Group), her works include many well-reviewed titles, such as the Carter G. Woodson Honor Book Ella Fitzgerald: First Lady of Song, and the Oregon Book Award contender Women of the Wild West. In recent years, Krohn ventured from the biographical format to create graphic science and graphic history titles for Capstone Press and Gale Cengage Learning. She has authored metaphysical titles about fortune-telling and ghosts, fiction, and books about contemporary social issues.

Krohn lives in Eugene, Oregon.

== Awards and honors ==
Krohn's books have received several honors, including the Carter G. Woodson Book Award (honor), Pennsylvania School Librarians Association Young Adult Top Forty, CBC Children's Choices, and Booklist Top 10 Series Nonfiction.
