= Kron =

Kron may refer to:

== People ==
- Gabriel Kron (1901–1968), Hungarian-American electrical engineer
- Gerald Kron (1913–2012), American astronomer
- Kathleen Anne Kron (born 1956), American biologist
- Lisa Kron (born 1961), American actress and playwright
- Patrick Kron (born 1953), French businessman
- Otto Kron (1911–1955), German Obersturmbannführer awarded the Knight's Cross of the Iron Cross
- Robert Kron (born 1967), Czech ice hockey player
- Tommy Kron (1943–2007), American basketball player

== Other uses ==
- Kronecker product, a matrix operation sometimes abbreviated as kron
- Kron, an Iguanodon in the 2000 Disney animated film Dinosaur
- 2796 Kron, a main-belt asteroid
- KRON-TV, a television station in San Francisco
- Kron (film), a 2019 Malaysian mystery drama
