= Sortedam Lake =

- Sortedams Sø (Danish)
- Location within Denmark
- Location: Copenhagen, Denmark
- Coordinates: 55°41′31″N 12°34′17″E
- Type: lake
- Surface area: 25 ha (62 acres)
- Average depth: 2 m (6 ft 7 in)
- Max. depth: 2.8 m (9 ft 2 in)

Sortedam Lake (Danish: Sortedams Sø) is a lake at Copenhagen in Denmark. A vertical slope was added in the area in 1929. In September 2012 it was announced that there were plans to build a floating bridge on the lake, and construction material left from digging tunnels would be placed on the eastern part of Sortedam in the Østerbrogade (‘Lille Trianglen’) area. Painter Christen Købke lived near the lake in the 1830s, and painted Efterårsmorgen ved Sortedamssøen in 1838.

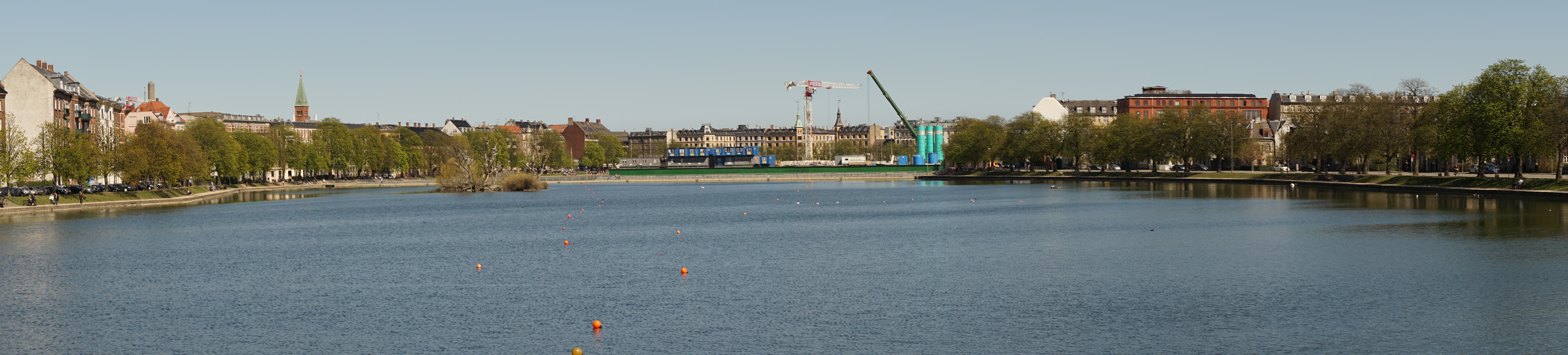
Panoramic view of Sortedam Lake looking North-East

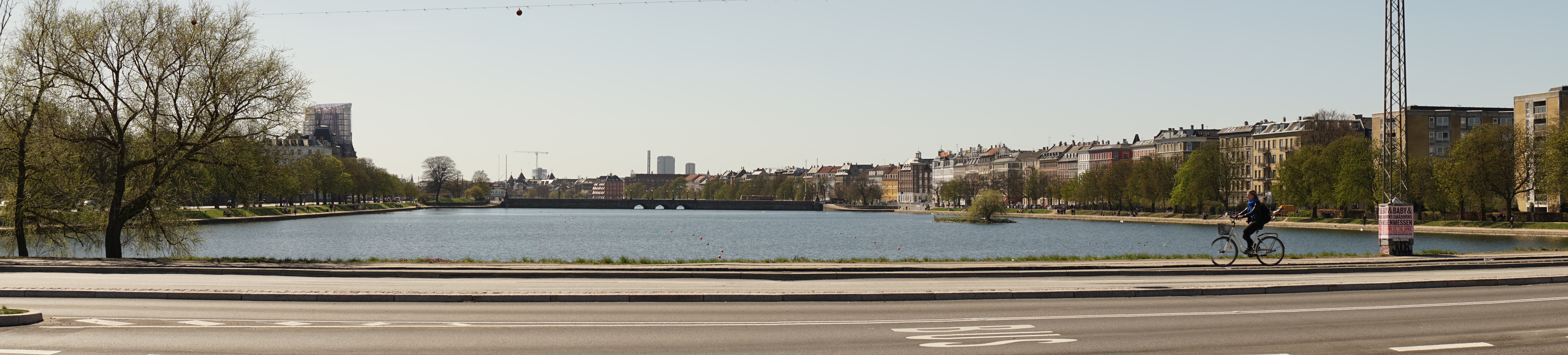
Panoramic view of Sortedam Lake looking South-West
