= Wozzeck =

1925 opera by Alban Berg; Berg's first opera

- Opera by Alban Berg
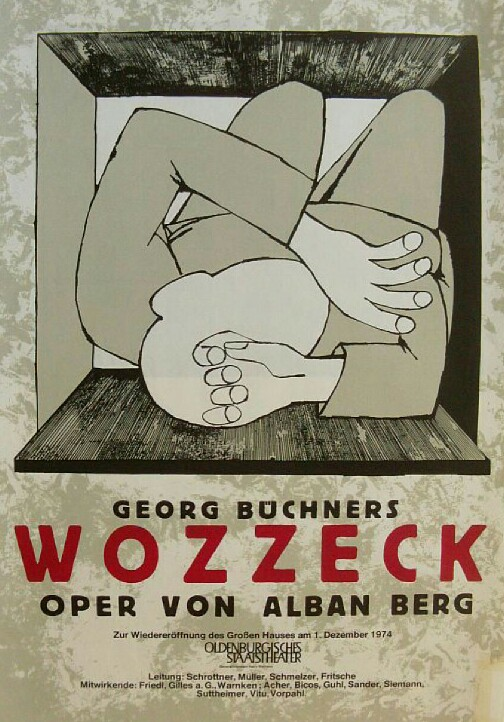
- Poster from the 1974 Oldenburgisches Staatstheater production
- Librettist: Berg
- Language: German
- Based on: Woyzeck by Georg Büchner
- Premiere: 14 December 1925; Berlin State Opera

Wozzeck (German pronunciation: [ˈvɔtsɛk]) is the first opera by Austrian composer Alban Berg, created between 1914 and 1922 and premiered on 14 December 1925 at the Berlin State Opera. Based on Georg Büchner's play Woyzeck (1836), it depicts a soldier's tragic slide into madness and murder amid militarism and social oppression.

Berg's expressionist musical language and innovative approach to musical form heightened the opera's psychological realism. He used atonality and leitmotifs to show individuals' emotional and existential plight under forces of authority. Drawing on tonal and rhythmic idioms from folk and dance music, he linked psychological and social dimensions and exposed social alienation. He also invoked latent themes and topics of destiny and nature, reflecting an understanding of humanity as shaped by universal forces.

A succès de scandale at its premiere, Wozzeck faced backlash but became a landmark of early 20th-century modernist opera. It helped establish the viability of large-scale atonal drama and exerted wide influence. It remains a cornerstone of the repertoire, celebrated for its narrative power and complex musical structure.

== Background ==
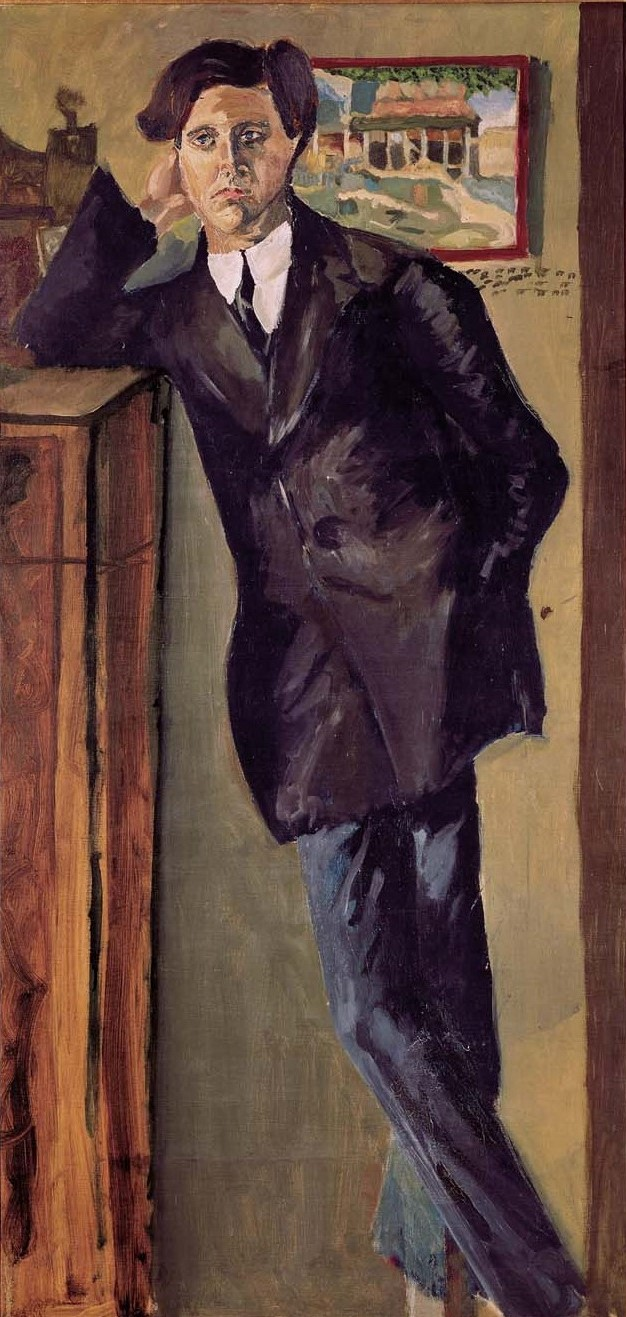
Berg (portrait, Schoenberg)

Berg created the Literaturoper (literary opera) Wozzeck from 1914 to 1922, stalled by World War I. He had first pursued a literary career, with juvenilia in lyric poetry and drama, including after Henrik Ibsen's play Ghosts. But in 1904, he wrote in his diary that music was "a higher form of revelation". Berg's mentor Arnold Schoenberg advised, "let poetry lead you ... to music".

Schoenberg premiered some of Berg's aphoristic Altenberg Lieder (1911–12), which caused the 1913 Skandalkonzert. Next Berg planned a vocal symphony after Gustav Mahler, but Schoenberg told him to try a suite of character pieces (the Three Pieces for Orchestra, 1913–15), while affirming his operatic interest in the chamber plays of August Strindberg.

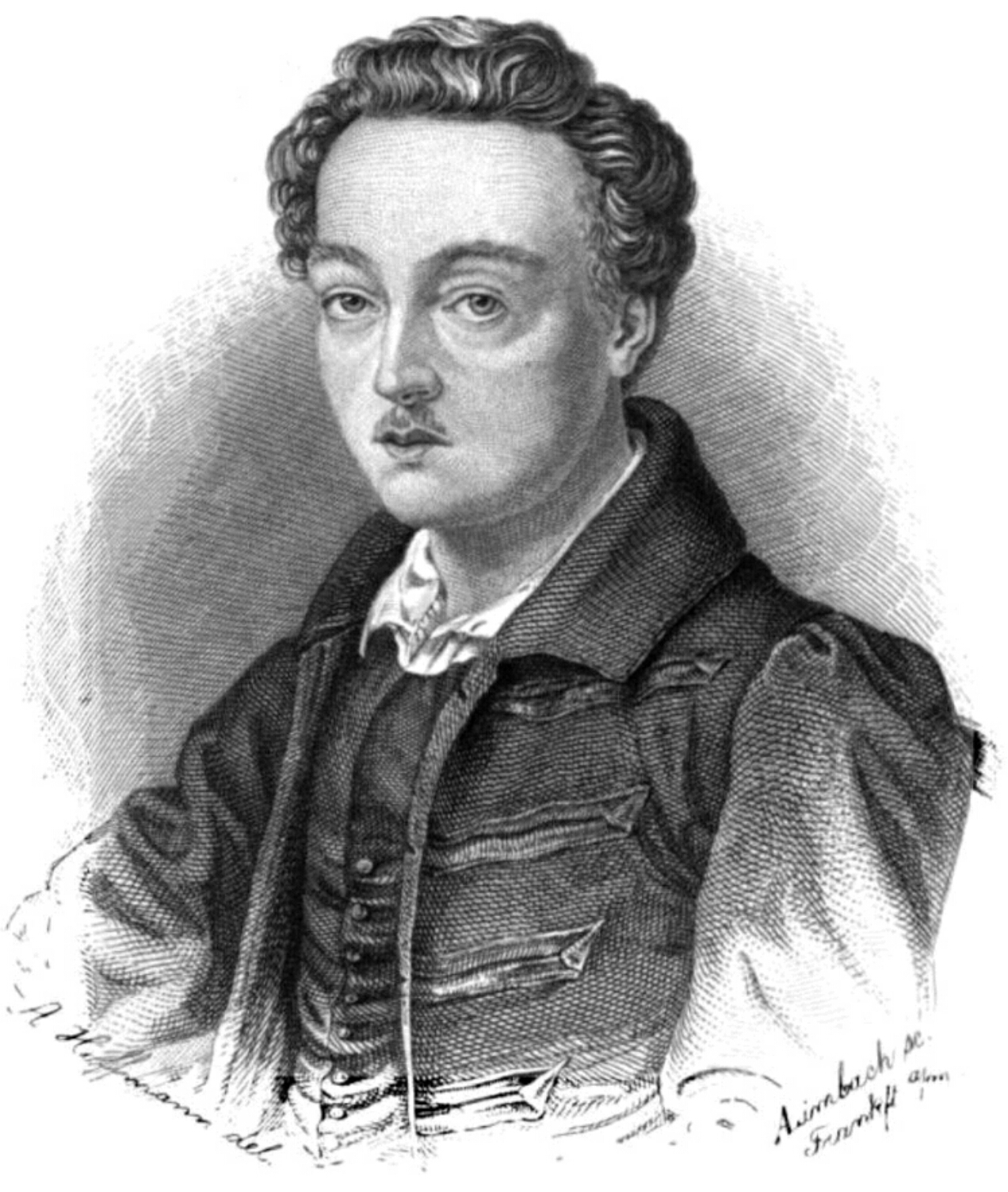
Georg Büchner (illustration, Franzos's edition)

In May 1914, Berg twice attended the local premiere of Georg Büchner's 1836 play Woyzeck, then mistitled Wozzeck, at Vienna's Residenzbühne. Among visiting Munich Residenz Theatre actors, Albert Steinrück played Wozzeck. Berg recalled he "immediately" decided to adapt it. His libretto is indebted to Karl Emil Franzos's version of Wozzeck, published in a Neue Freie Presse serial (1875) and a "critical, complete" Büchner edition (1879, based on poorly legible papers from Büchner's brother, physician Ludwig Büchner).

=== Büchner, Woyzeck, and Berg ===
==== Büchner and Woyzeck ====
Trained in biology and medicine, Georg Büchner taught comparative anatomy at the University of Zurich. A Romantic in science like his patron Lorenz Oken, he treated taboo literary topics (sex, religion, and politics) and stressed characterization over narrative. He held proto-Marxian views and, for his first play, Danton's Death (1835), studied the French Revolution. It "crushed" him, he wrote his fiancée Minna Jaeglé in 1834, calling human nature a "terrible sameness" and individuals "froth on the waves" in a "ridiculous struggle against an iron law".

His work expresses a unity of opposites from Hegel and Spinoza. Philosopher György Lukács called him a literary realist, citing his call for artists to "submerge themselves in the life of the ... humblest person and ... reproduce it with all its faint agitations, hints of experience, the subtle ... play of his features" (Lenz, 1835). German literature scholar John Reddick argued his style expressed paradoxes in mosaics, as in a "shattered whole": "All my being is in this single moment", says Leonce at the breaking point (Leonce and Lena, 1836).

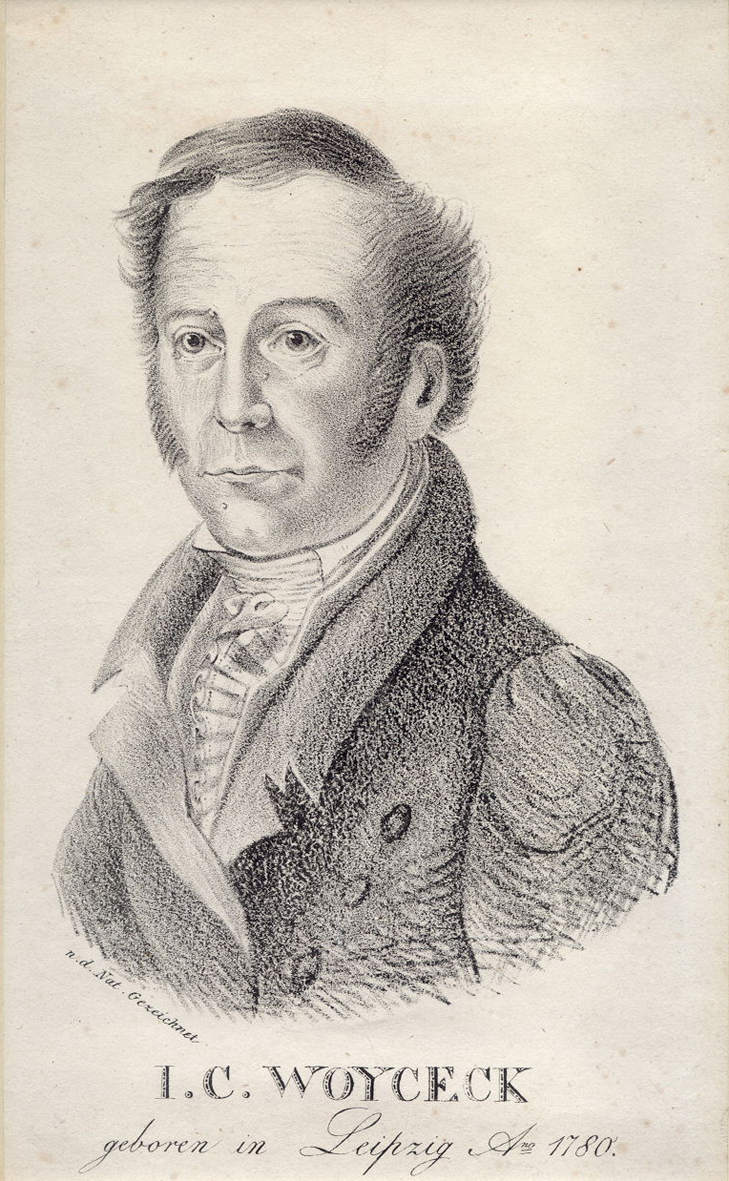
Woyzeck (drawing, anonymous)

Based on romantic femicide cases in a medical journal to which Ludwig contributed, mainly physician Johann Christian August Clarus's on military barber Johann Christian Woyzeck, Woyzeck mixes the grotesque with tragicomedy. For the competency evaluation, Clarus reported that Woyzeck had episodic psychosis but "freier Vernunftgebrauch" (free use of reason) and "Willensfreiheit" (free will), leading to trial (conviction, 1821; beheading, 1824). Büchner died of typhus in 1837, leaving an untitled, fragmentary script with shifting character names (perhaps an open drama).

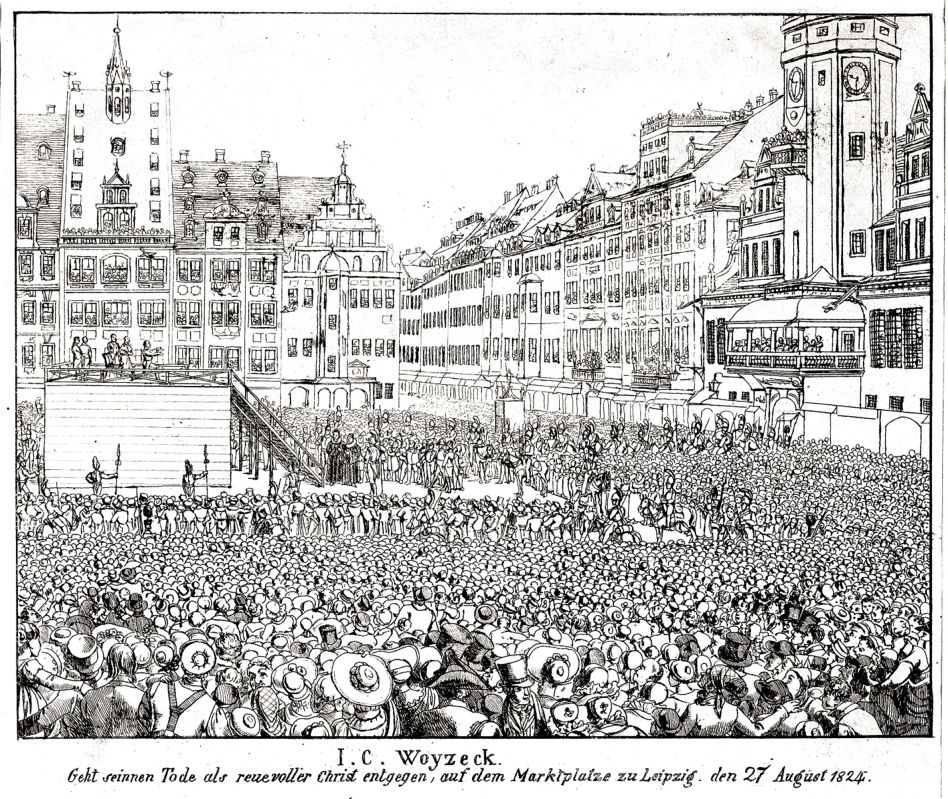
Woyzeck's beheading (lithograph, C. G. Giessler)

==== Toward Berg's Wozzeck ====
===== Source texts and stage treatment =====
Using Paul Landau's Wozzeck–Lenz: Zwei Fragmente (Wozzeck and Lenz: Two Fragments; 1909, reprinted 1913), which resequenced Franzos's 26 scenes, Berg mostly followed theater director Arthur Rundt's 1914 cuts. That year, Hugo Bieber tied Wozzeck to Woyzeck. Georg Witkowski's 1919 critical edition argued Franzos's omissions, edits, and additions ruined Büchner's play. Berg favored Franzos-derived versions' freer, livelier text, which polarized grotesque and tragic aspects, over Witkowski's, and kept Franzos's title as it entered the public domain.

Berg's ending owed more to Franzos than Büchner but was not Franzos's or Landau's final scene. Berg characteristically added personal touches. Scripted coughs echo his asthma. The Doctor's salamanders line mocks scientist–musician Paul Kammerer, Helene's former lover. (Note: Scandalized by fraud allegations, Kammerer died by suicide in 1926.) Berg had a cinematic sense of drama, which he wrote should run "breathlessly" ahead. Cyclical day-and-night transitions contrast outdoor natural realism with indoor abstraction and reinforce wartime life-and-death themes as in Schoenberg's earlier Lied Op. 12 No. 2 "Der verlorene Haufen" (The forlorn hope) or the popular soldiers' Volkslied "Morgenrot" (Red dawn). (Note: Webern explored such themes in, among other Lieder, his 1915 setting of "Der Tag ist vergangen ("The day has ended"), a pious Volkslied from Des Knaben Wunderhorn.)

===== Milieu and influences =====
Murderer, Hope of Women (poster, Kokoschka)

Shaped by Symbolism's exaltation of cultural outsiders, Berg came from the same expressionist milieu as novelist Franz Kafka, painter Emil Nolde, and poets Gottfried Benn, Rainer Maria Rilke, (Note: Berg set Rilke's "Traumgekrönt" in Seven Early Songs. For Rilke, Büchner's play was about "the way this misused person ... stands in universal space, malgré lui, in the infinite relationship of the stars".) and Franz Werfel. (Note: The Second Viennese School often set Stefan George's Symbolist poetry. Shreffler described his poems as "hyperexpressive", eliciting "equally vivid and extreme music". They may have influenced Schoenberg's atonal turn in the String Quartet No. 2. Webern set fourteen George texts, ten as atonal Lieder Opp. 3–4. George translated Baudelaire's Les Fleurs du mal, from which Berg took the hidden text of his Lyric Suite and three poems for Der Wein.) Oskar Kokoschka saw Büchner as an early expressionist (and later considered producing Berg's Wozzeck). His 1909 play Murderer, the Hope of Women recalls Woyzeck and influenced expressionist opera, (Note: Kokoschka's play inspired Paul Hindemith's first expressionist opera Mörder, Hoffnung der Frauen and may have influenced Schoenberg's Die glückliche Hand (The Lucky Hand). Schoenberg called Kokoschka "the greatest living painter".) which had explored grotesque psychology and violence since Richard Strauss's Salome and Schoenberg's Erwartung (Expectation). Wozzeck, following Strauss's Elektra and Schoenberg's Die glückliche Hand (The Lucky Hand), continued this.

Berg's tastes were broader than Schoenberg's or Webern's. He shared their love of Mahler, Johannes Brahms, and Richard Wagner but played a wide repertoire, including opera, piano four hands with his family. His sister Smaragda, a Theodor Leschetizky pupil and later Vienna State Opera musician, sang his first songs at home and likely introduced him to writer Karl Kraus and the impressionism of Claude Debussy and Maurice Ravel. His brother Karl (Charly or Charley), also a singer, loved Wagner.

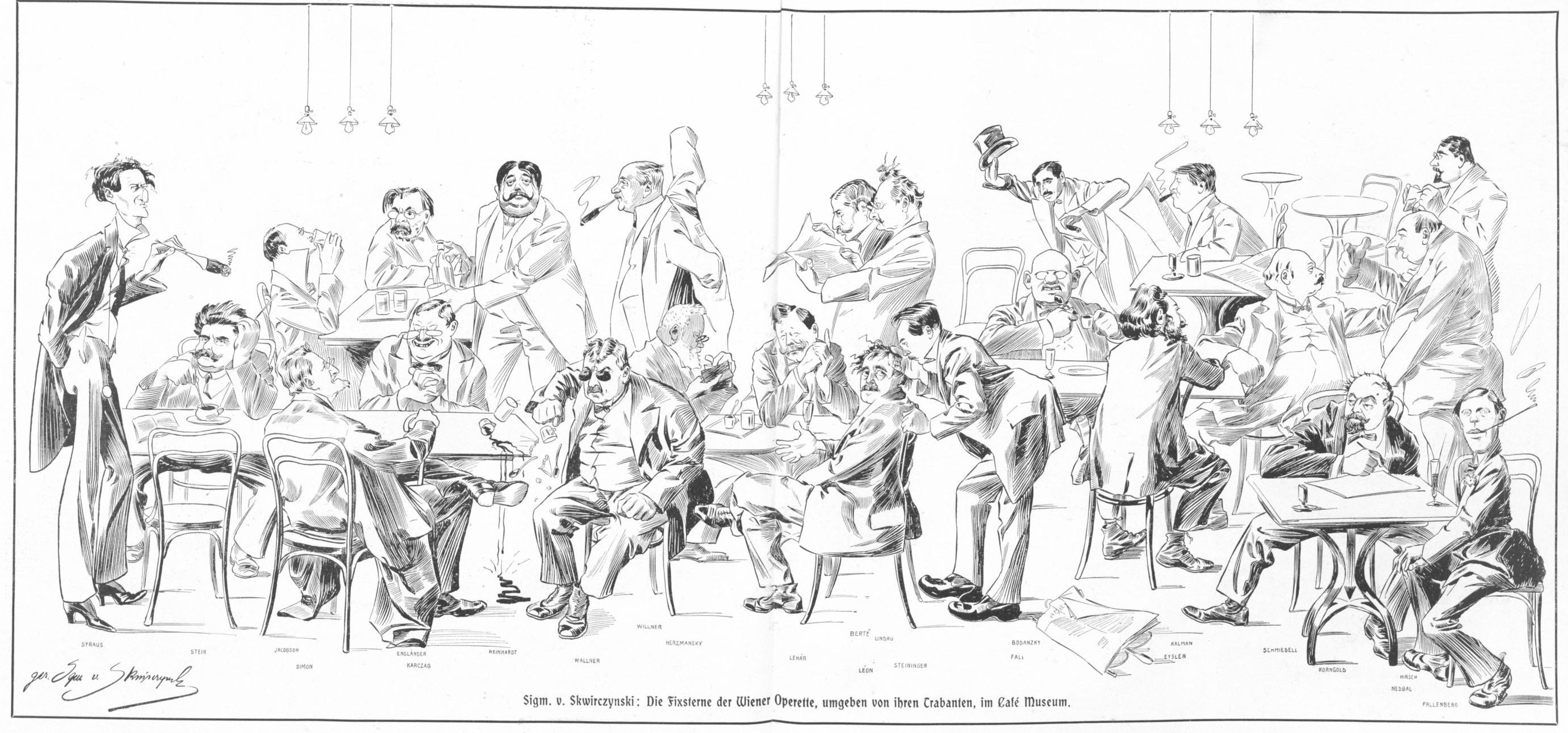
Operetta composers at Café Museum (illustration, Zygmunt Skwirczyński)

Berg first saw his wife Helene, who trained as a Wagnerian singer, at the opera and wooed her with songs. He saw Salome's Graz premiere in 1906 and attended many rehearsals of Paul Dukas's Ariane et Barbe-bleue, studying its "thousands of splendid passages". Through Viennese coffee house culture at forums like the Café Museum, he met innovative, popular figures ranging from the prodigy Erich Korngold to operetta composers Franz Lehár and Oscar Straus.

Berg saw Debussy's Pelléas et Mélisande as a model of modernist Literaturoper, a direction he had explored in drafting a libretto based on Franz Grillparzer's play Die Ahnfrau. As in Pelléas, he linked Wozzeck's scenes with short interludes while keeping Büchner's jagged brutality and eerie realism. He may have also drawn from Franz Schreker's Der ferne Klang, having prepared its piano-vocal score in 1911 (though he disliked Schreker's next opera, Das Spielwerk und die Prinzessin).

=== History of composition process ===
==== 1914–16: Genesis amid war ====
Trahütten villa

On frugal Sommerfrischen (summer vacations), often at his wife's family farm and villa in Trahütten, Berg precomposed Wozzeck from as early as 1914, conceptualizing and sketching perhaps two scenes while continuing to compose Three Pieces for Orchestra. He hesitated when Schoenberg said the play was unsuitable.

War erupted, and Kraus's attack on "the cash register of world history" cooled Berg's patriotism. Long fearing death from severe asthma, then a possibly allergy-related somatic symptom disorder, Berg was first deemed unfit by the Austro-Hungarian Army. His pupil Theodor W. Adorno saw a tortured artist's hypochondriasis and substance dependence in his self-medication and physician visits, including to Sigmund Freud. "My spirit would ... have broken", Berg wrote Schoenberg, rejecting "a past time and a beloved place" as evoked by a bell to bait "curious Russian heads" from trenches to shoot.

Wozzeck, like Berg, cannot sleep amid a chorus of snoring soldiers (1951, photo Fred Erismann)

Berg was conscripted in mid-1915 and bought the play while finishing Three Pieces for Orchestra. That winter, he began the unfinished opera Nacht (Nokturn) (Night/Nocturne; 1915–17). (Note: Drafts surfaced in 2006. This was its working title.) Its semi-autobiogaphical protagonist falls asleep discussing philosophy with his subconscious Other. A nostalgic, erotic, and nightmarish dream sequence ends with a film (Note: Berg used film in his next opera, Lulu.) of a dark mountain forest thinning into snowfields at dawn. It recalls Schoenberg's Erwartung and Glückliche Hand and Strindberg's Jakob brottas (Jacob Wrestles). Berg used musicodramatic ideas from Nacht (Nokturn), like snoring, in Wozzeck.

By February 1916, working 30-hour guard-duty shifts in Vienna, Berg was still outlining Wozzeck in four acts and 23 scenes. That April, on office duty at the Bisamberg military base, he described remote, barbed-wire-fenced, lice-ridden barracks and deserters being strappadoed:

Ecce Homo (mosaic, Kokoschka)

Their arms are crossed and tied behind ... then hoisted up on a tree so that the prisoner can only stand on his toes. When he can do that no more, he hangs until he faints from the pain. ... I'll have to tell you [more] in person.

He never saw combat. As a one-year volunteer (Einjährig-Freiwillige) officer, he was assigned that month to the Imperial War Ministry, likely via his brother Karl there (not Helene's possible nonmarital father Franz Joseph I). In August, he wrote Helene: "For months I haven't done any work on Wozzeck. Everything suffocated, buried!".

==== 1917–18: Resolve and state collapse ====
In early 1917, Berg wrote playwright Erhard Buschbeck that his two opera ideas were "equally old". That summer, he worked on Wozzeck on several weeks' leave at Trahütten, composing at the piano each morning, sketching outside while foraging for mushrooms and hiking the mountains, lakes, and springs, and reading at night. Helene saw this "love of nature" in his music, including Wozzeck. In an August letter to Schoenberg, he marked 1917 as the symbolic year he committed to Wozzeck. Likely from his war service, which he called indefinite "slavery", he saw more subjugation than poverty in Wozzeck. Asked why he was personally moved, he said in 1930:

There was probably some natural relationship between me and this poem. (Note: Dichtung ("poem") is a German term combining meanings of invention, fiction, poetry, and imaginative creation. In the late 18th century, it gained prominence as Johann Gottfried Herder used it to denote the authentic poetic language of humanity, and as it also acquired nationalist connotations of true inspiration against the claimed artifice of French Literatur. It became the dominant term for German literary production through Goethe, Schiller, Hegel, and Gervinus. Use declined after World War II.) ... Wozzeck is no simple "we-poor-people" play. What happened to Wozzeck can happen to any poor person, regardless of ... clothing ... to anyone who is subjugated ... and cannot defend himself.

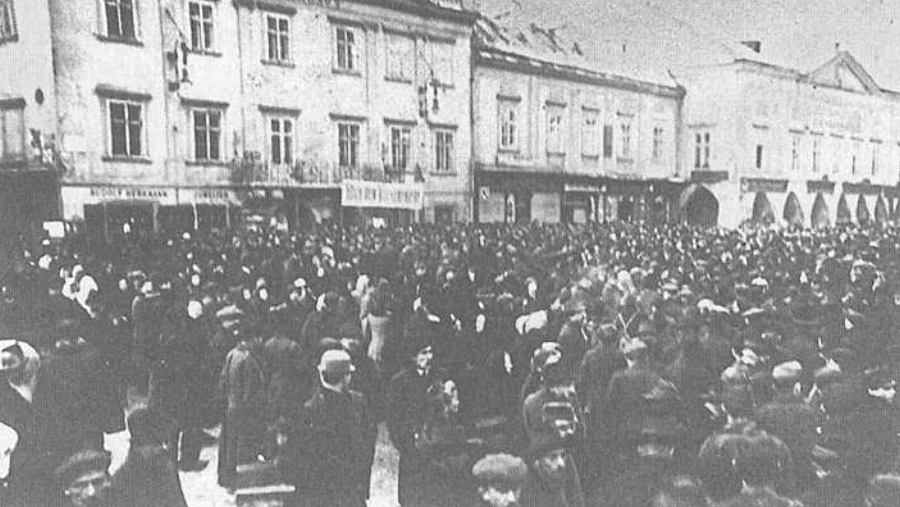
Austro-Hungarian strike of January 1918

In summer 1918, on six weeks' leave at Trahütten, Berg revised the libretto and finished two scenes, likely the second scenes of acts 1 and 2. That June, he wrote Schoenberg of being "degraded to the point of self-loathing" (in 1924, he drafted a letter to Kraus confiding he had experienced suicidal ideation). "There's a bit of me in [Wozzeck]", he wrote Helene that August, having lived the war "just as dependent on people I hate ... in chains, sick, captive, resigned, humiliated." Praising the drama's "unheard-of intensity of mood", he wrote Anton Webern that "the fate of this poor man, exploited and tormented by all the world ... touches me". He planned to alternate thematic song forms with Erwartung-inspired motivic variations. He gave the Captain and Doctor more Sprechstimme (half-singing, half-speaking) roles, as in melodrama, but later used more conventional singing.

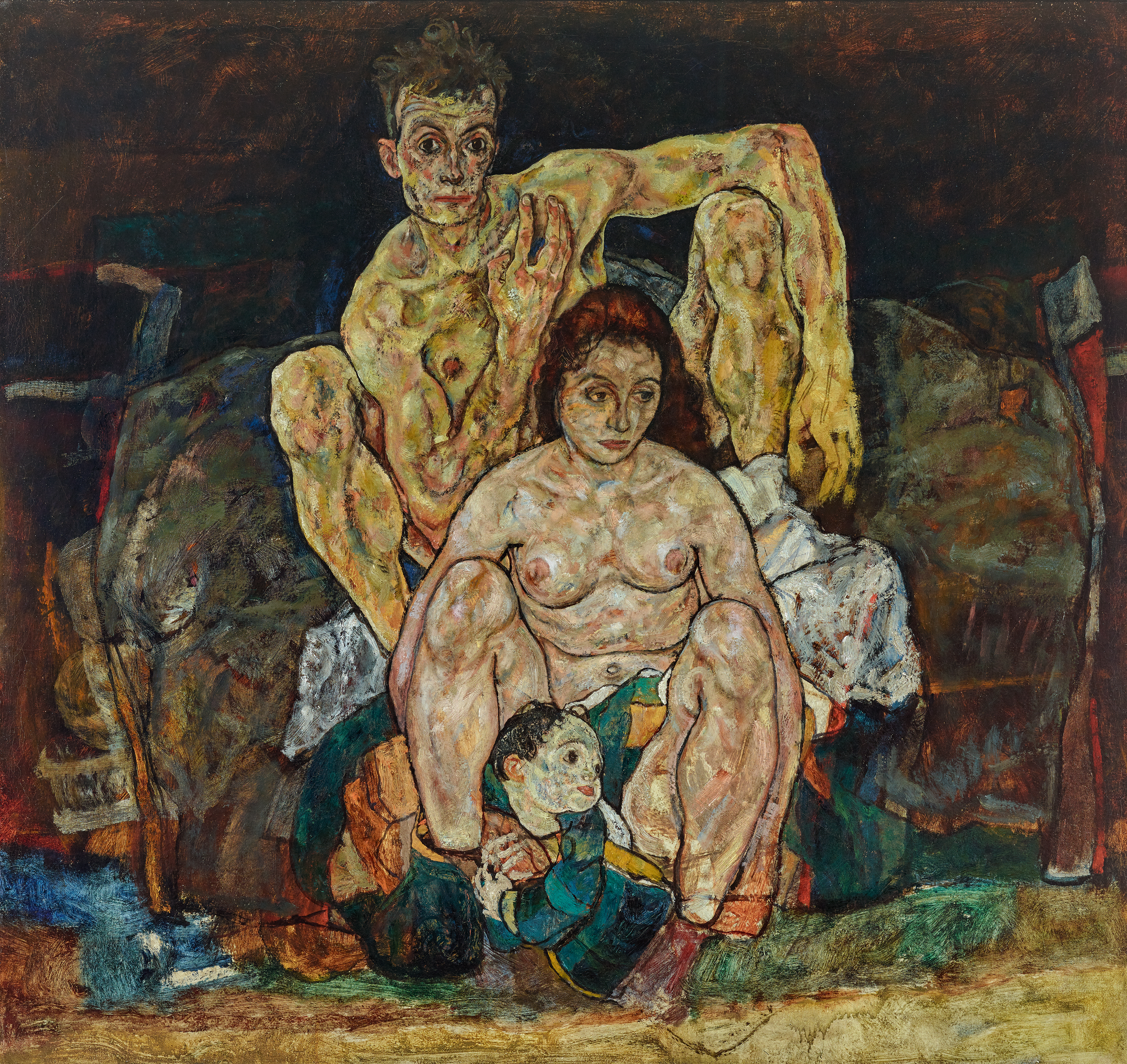
In The Family (1918), Egon Schiele envisions a family. That year, he died of Spanish flu. He had designed the poster for a 1912 concert featuring Berg's music.

That year, Schoenberg hired him at the Society for Private Musical Performances to help with administration, rehearsals, music arrangements, and writing. The Bergs caught Spanish flu that fall, and the pandemic worsened labor shortages and hunger (Note: This hunger led to the creation of the Volksernährung and featured in the Lebensfähigkeitsdebatte Österreichs.) amid the war and its aftermath. The Berghof, his family's farm and business at Lake Ossiach, faced failure and nearby food riots in Villach. "Starving and freezing millions" crowded Vienna, writer Stefan Zweig recalled, where "revolution or ... catastrophe" seemed possible amid unfolding state collapse, including the dissolution of Austria-Hungary and German revolution of 1918–1919. That November, Berg's military service ended with armistices and Austro-Hungarian defeat. "I am again a person!", he wrote Buschbeck.

==== 1919–22: Progress through war's aftermath ====
In July 1919, Berg finalized Wozzeck's symmetrical scene order, finishing act 1 in four weeks before copying parts for Three Pieces for Orchestra that August. Wounded veteran and composer–pianist Erwin Schulhoff played Berg's Piano Sonata in Prague and hoped to premiere the Orchestra Pieces there and at the Staatliche Kunstsammlungen Dresden. In advertisements he sent Berg for these "Progress Concerts", he tied the revolutions of 1917–1923 to a spiritual "revolution in art".

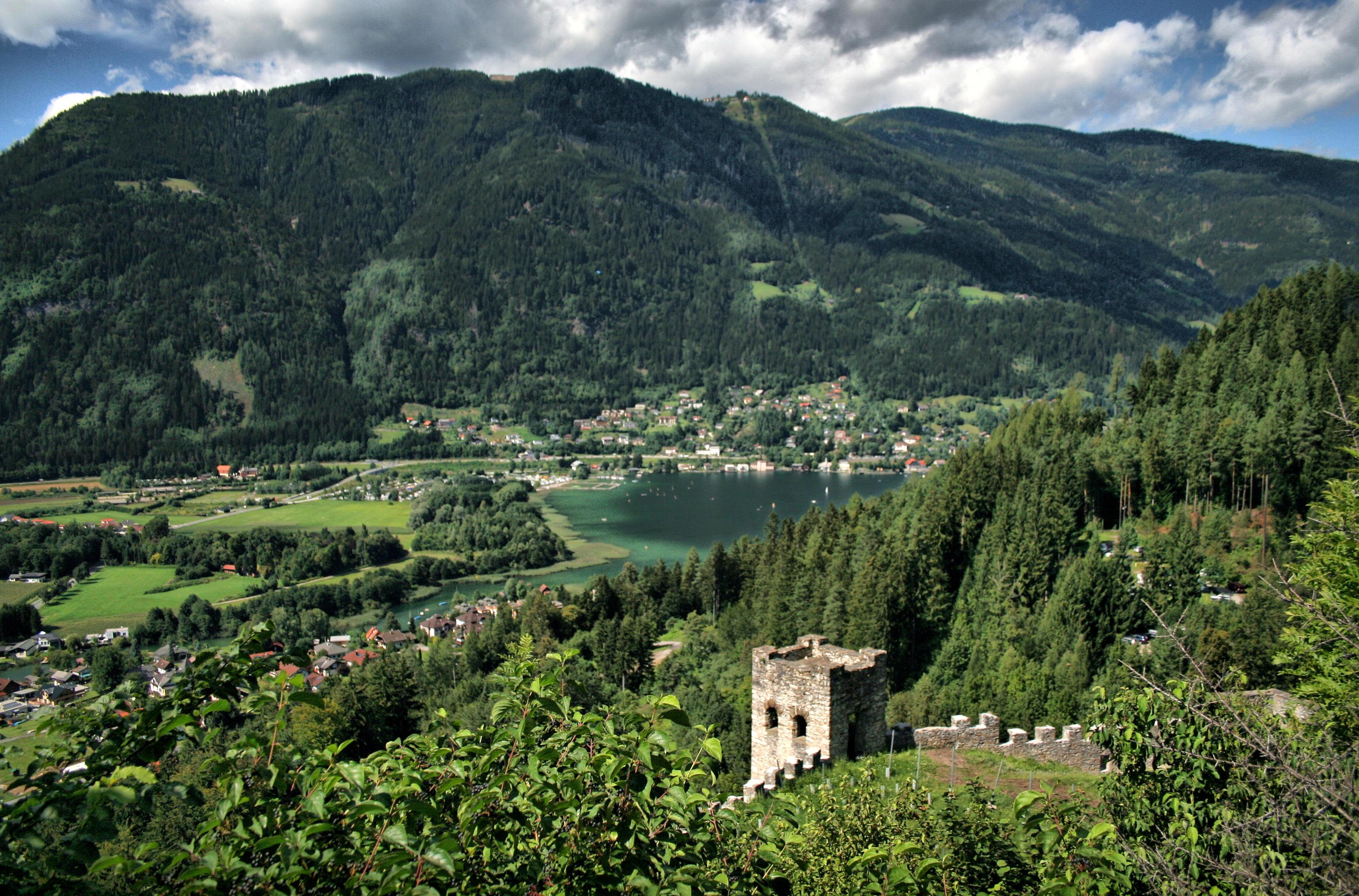
St. Andrä village on Lake Ossiach outside Villach, near or including the Berghof

That fall, Berg and Helene faced what she called the "Berghof Catastrophe". His mother Johanna, having enabled his composing with an appanage, sought their help managing the Berghof. Wartime mismanagement of its guest house and tavern caused feuds as the family gathered there partly in hunger. The government had imposed production quotas and resorted to confiscation for food rationing. Despite "freezing and having nothing to live on", Berg emphasized that he was "happy" in a November 1919 letter to Schulhoff, recalling war "years of suffering and humiliation at a low rank, not composing a single note".

Schulhoff had circulated an internationalist artists' petition, and in this letter, Berg sympathized, while, following Schoenberg, prioritizing Austro-German art music. Berg wrote that a nation like Germany (Note: The First Austrian Republic had just been created from the Republic of German-Austria.) might "deserve" its defeat for how it "treats its greatest". (Note: Innovative classical music had long faced unreliable support despite successes, as with Wozzeck. Amid widespread poverty, Schoenberg's Society was a subscription business model for sustaining Neue Musik (new music) by composers across Europe through performance. It grew out of open rehearsals. Schulhoff soon co-founded a Prague Society for Private Musical Performances.) He blamed the war and its aftermath on capitalism, militarism, the press, and, uncharacteristically, Jews, calling himself an "antimilitarist" like Kraus, who polemically examined journalism and German–Jewish assimilation. Berg asked Schulhoff who among the Entente, "outside Russia", had the same "ring of idealism" to their names as Karl Liebknecht and Rosa Luxemburg, recently murdered Spartacist uprising leaders.

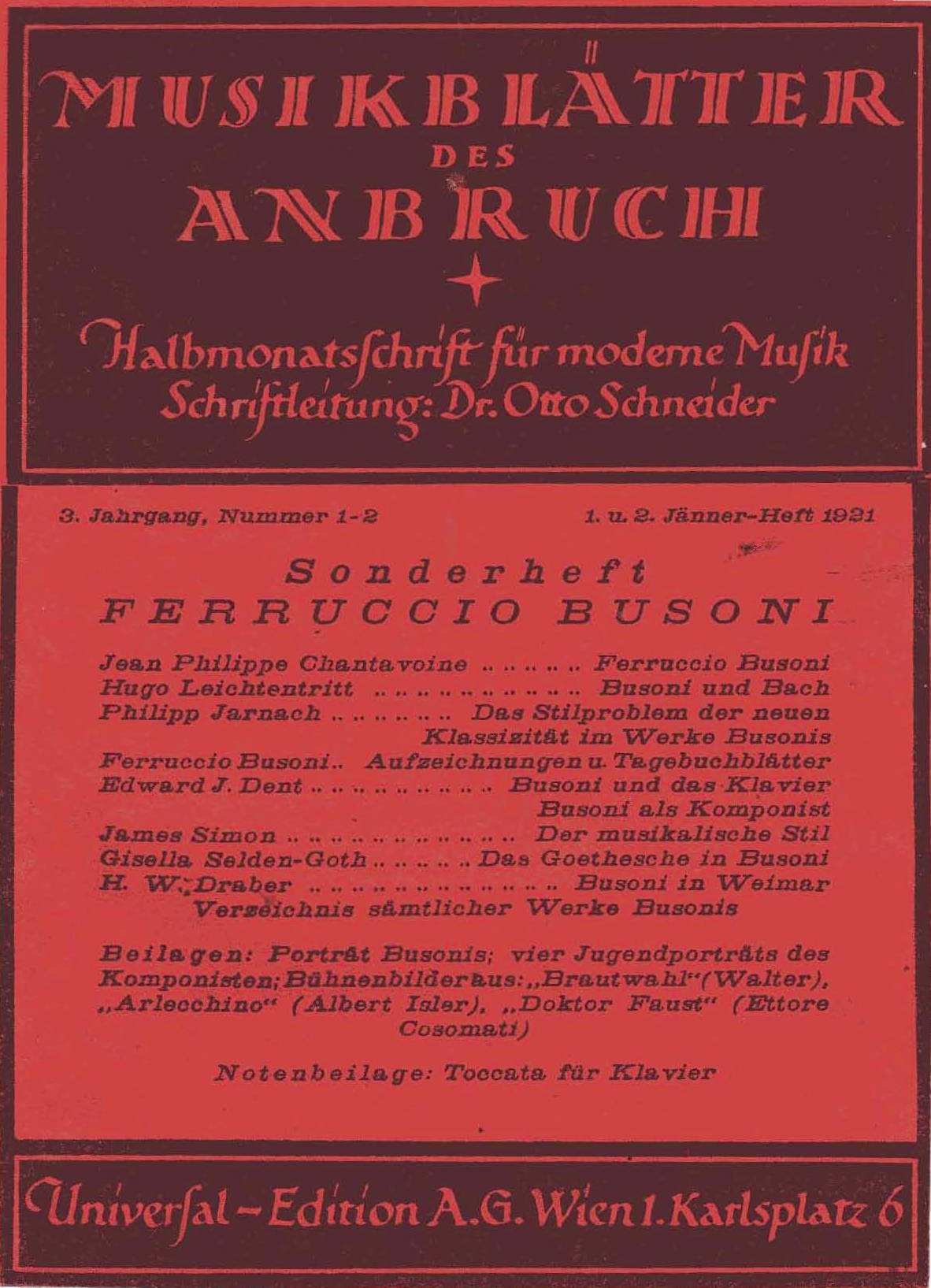
Musikblätter des Anbruch, issue cover

Berg gradually resisted his family's demands at the Berghof, writing Webern in March 1920 that he would instead need to make money by editing, teaching, and writing, including for Musikblätter des Anbruch, the music journal of Universal Edition, though he might have even less time to compose. That April, Johanna sold the Berghof as he wished and as another family member had advised. In July, he planned three scenes (likely 1, 3, and 5) of act 2 in the shape of a four- or five-movement symphony, finishing them by August.

In 1921, the Society closed as the Austrian hyperinflation began. Johanna kept planning her family's future. She distrusted Helene's krone-based passive income and feared that "componiererei" (fooling around composing) would impoverish Berg. With dollars from her late son Herman's Florida estate, she funded New York trusts managed by Geo. Borgfeldt & Co., a firm long tied to the family, enabling Berg to keep composing. He finished act 2 in Vienna (as Helene visited Bad Hofgastein) and act 3 in Trahütten by October. While polishing and orchestrating Wozzeck, he recalled that Schoenberg had "tried to take away all my pleasure" in it. It was done, he wrote Schoenberg in June 1922.

== Composition ==
Wozzeck's superiors use innuendo (Horst Ruether, Willy Ferenz, Hans Hofmann)

Within about 90 minutes, the music and drama depict militarism, social exploitation, and casual sadism in a small town. Wozzeck's psychological disintegration unfolds amid poverty, jealousy, and ignorance.

=== Dramatic overview ===
In act 1, Wozzeck shaves the Captain, who mocks him (scene 1). Gathering wood with Andres, Wozzeck has disturbing visions (scene 2). Wozzeck visits and tells Marie, who had been admiring other soldiers (scene 3). He tells the Doctor, who, thrilled, keeps him in a medical experiment (scene 4). The Drum Major seduces Marie (scene 5).

In act 2, Wozzeck suspects Marie of infidelity (scene 1). His superiors fuel his suspicions (scene 2). He confronts Marie, who denies it (scene 3). Later, he sees her dancing with the Drum Major (scene 4). That night, Wozzeck cannot sleep, has more visions, and is beaten by the Drum Major (scene 5).

In act 3, Marie worries about her sins (scene 1). Wozzeck takes her to a forest pond and cuts her throat (scene 2). He goes dancing, but people see blood on him, so he flees (scene 3). He drowns while disposing of the knife in the pond (scene 4). The next morning, while playing, another child tells their son that his mother is dead. He blankly follows the children to see her body (scene 5).

=== Scoring ===
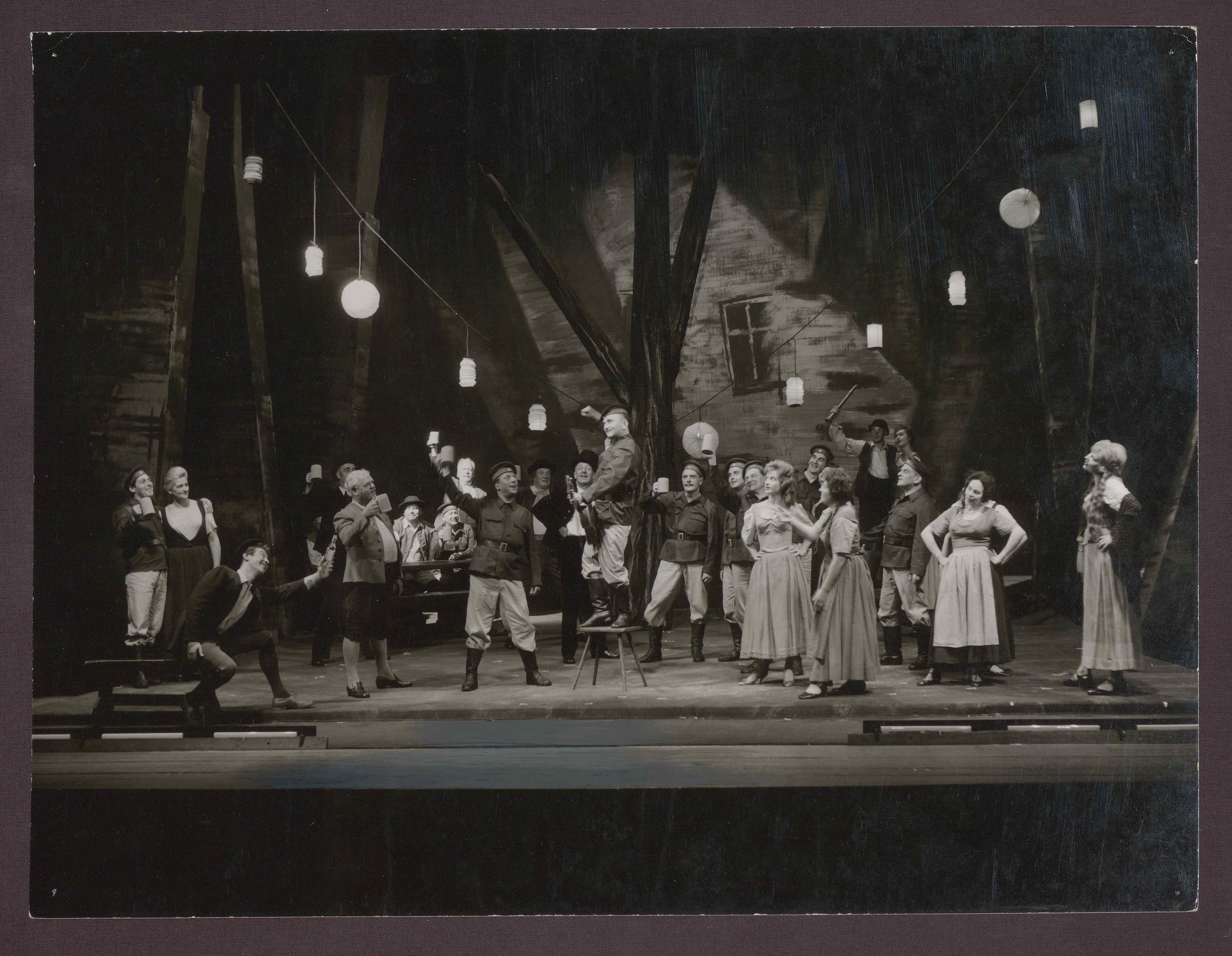
Townsfolk carouse with on-stage tavern musicians (Badisches Staatstheater Karlsruhe, early 1960s; photos Gerd Weiss)

Wozzeck is scored for voices, choirs (men's, women's, and children's), and large orchestra sometimes sorted into distinct ensembles: military band (act 1, scene 3), chamber orchestra (act 2, scene 3), and tavern band (act 2, scene 4). The latter's out-of-tune, upright piano returns in act 3, scene 3. All but the chamber orchestra perform onstage.

==== Roles ====
Costume design (sketches, Didier Sainderichin)

Roles, voice types, premiere cast
Role	Voice type	Premiere cast, 14 December 1925 Conductor: Erich Kleiber
Wozzeck	baritone	Leo Schützendorf
Marie, his common-law wife	soprano	Sigrid Johanson
Marie's son	treble	Ruth Iris Witting
Captain	buffo tenor	Waldemar Henke
Doctor	buffo bass	Martin Abendroth
Drum Major	heldentenor	Fritz Soot
Andres, Wozzeck's friend	lyric tenor	Gerhard Witting
Margret, Marie's neighbor	contralto	Jessika Koettrik
First Apprentice	deep bass	Ernst Osterkamp
Second Apprentice	high baritone	Alfred Borchardt
Madman	high tenor	Marcel Noé
A Soldier	baritone	Leonhard Kern
Soldiers, apprentices, women, children

==== Instrumentation ====
Pit orchestra: 4 flutes (all double piccolos), 4 oboes (4th doubles English horn), 4 B♭ clarinets (1st doubles A, 3rd–4th double E♭), bass clarinet, 3 bassoons, contrabassoon, 4 F horns, 4 F trumpets, 4 trombones (alto, 2 tenor, bass), tuba, 4 timpani drums, 2 bass drums (1 with rute), suspended cymbals, bass-drum cymbal, crash cymbals, snare drum, 2 tam-tams (1 small), triangle, xylophone, celesta, harp, string section (14–16 first violins, 14–16 second violins, 10–12 violas, 10–12 cellos, and 8–10 double basses)

Military band: piccolo, 2 flutes, 2 oboes, 2 E♭ clarinets, 2 bassoons, 2 F horns, 2 F trumpets, 3 trombones, tuba, bass drum, crash cymbals, snare drum, triangle

Chamber orchestra: flute (doubles piccolo), oboe, English horn, 2 clarinets (E♭, A), bass clarinet, bassoon, contrabassoon, 2 F horns, 2 violins, viola, cello, double bass

Tavern band: C clarinet, F bombardon (or muted tuba), out-of-tune upright "tavern" piano, accordion, guitar, 2 fiddles

=== Music ===
In the music and its notation, Berg shapes Wozzeck's visions ("Lines and circles, strange figures, would that one could read them!") as cyclic figures spun from melodic lines.

As in much of his work, Berg navigates dialectics of convention and innovation, form and content, and structure and function in Wozzeck, often integrating and dissolving musical material cyclically. Small, fluid, sometimes rhythmic motifs recur in new contexts and undergo transformations, helping to shape organic unity. (Note: The musical subject was long likened to a generative oratory idea. The Formenlehre (form theory) of Adolf Bernhard Marx develops this notion, including from the "Muss es ein?" motif of Beethoven's String Quartet No. 16. Marx synthesized historical–teleological (Hegelian, developmental) and genetic–biological (Goethean, morphological) conceptions, or inherited forms and content unfolding through organic thematic–motivic growth, with units forming complex designs. A duality arose between form as generative-and-unique or fixed-and-conformational, often valorizing the former. Schoenberg arguably extended this in his Grundgestalt (basic shape or idea) and developing variation, and even viewed tonality as a kind of provisional inheritance in his Harmonielehre (Theory of Harmony). Berg stressed "richness of forms and shapes" to support Wozzeck's innovative continuation of tradition. Adorno saw these apparent dualisms as dialectically interdependent, or co-constitutive. "Like heads and tails on a coin", he wrote, "Berg's music has two tendencies ... to derive objective construction from subjective illusion ... and ... through construction to surpass the subjective essence.") He makes symbolic allusions to tonality and freely uses chord progressions amid an overall atonality typified by symmetrical interval cycles and sometimes dense rhythmic schemes. Frequent tempo gradations and contrasts gain formal and dramatic significance.

==== Structure ====
Like earlier composers, Berg innovated on operatic tradition. Wanting his work to avoid seeming Romantic or passé, he said he preferred strict musical form to "the Wagnerian recipe of 'through-composing'", (Note: Werfel, likely the Bergs' closest literary friend, had disparaged Wagner's "bloated excess" and "garrulous monotony" in favor of Verdi, perhaps shaping Berg's view of Wagner as "antiquated".) though Wozzeck is Wagnerian in its complexity and unmoored emotionality. His hybrid approach is an integrated number opera. Each act and scene has an old or abstract musical form in the manner of absolute music, yet with dramatic significance, like the passacaglia for the Doctor's exam or the triple fugue for the love-triangle innuendo.

Büchner's text repeats motifs: "ein guter Mensch" (a good person), "wir arme Leut" (we poor folk), and "eins nach dem andern" (one after the other). From Bible quotes to Wozzeck's Apocryphal visions, he builds ideas into sections. Berg's music similarly accrues structure. Act 1 uses a chord progression (scene 2) and twelve-tone theme (scene 4). Act 3 uses a pitch (scene 2), rhythm (scene 3), hexachord (scene 4), tonality (interlude), and duration (scene 5). These patterns, along with the repeated lines and linked scenes, help shape musicodramatic repetition.

As Berg's pupil Fritz Mahler summarized, Wozzeck retains Franzos's overall dramatic structure (exposition, development, catastrophe):

Drama		Music
Expositions	Act 1	Five character pieces
Wozzeck and the Captain	Scene 1	Suite
Wozzeck and Andres	Scene 2	Rhapsody
Wozzeck and Marie	Scene 3	Military march and Lullaby
Wozzeck and the Doctor	Scene 4	Passacaglia
Marie and the Drum Major	Scene 5	Andante affettuoso (quasi Rondo)
Dramatic development	Act 2	Symphony in five movements
Marie and her son, then Wozzeck	Scene 1	Sonata movement
The Captain and the Doctor, then Wozzeck	Scene 2	Fantasia and Fugue
Marie and Wozzeck	Scene 3	Largo
Garden of a tavern	Scene 4	Scherzo
Guard room in the barracks	Scene 5	Rondo con introduzione
Catastrophe and epilogue	Act 3	Six inventions
Marie and her son	Scene 1	Invention on a theme
Wozzeck kills Marie	Scene 2	Invention on a single note
Tavern	Scene 3	Invention on a rhythm
Wozzeck drowns	Scene 4	Invention on a hexachord
	Interlude	Invention on a tonality
Children playing	Scene 5	Invention on a regular eighth-note movement

==== Harmony and motifs ====
Structural chords

A quasi-cadential gesture closes each act, where it would be "distinctly evident", Berg said, that "the circle of harmony comes full close", realized in an oscillation of blurred sonorities derived from two structural chords. The combined eight-pitch set of these chords, when transposed or inverted, can span the whole chromatic. Many scholars note that Berg seems to draw both harmony and melody from transformations of this set, often forming isomorphic figures built from segments of whole tones varied by semitone placement.

But in Wozzeck, unlike in the athematic (motivic) Clarinet Pieces (1913), Berg integrates harmony with thematic material to articulate larger structures and convey expression. (Note: Analysts use sets to describe these compositions as coherent structures, but Schoenberg's atonal logic was motivic and preliminary. He emphasized its value as descriptive and creative rather than prescriptive and determinative, holding that no harmonic "laws" had been codified. Adorno contrasted Berg with Schoenberg and Webern, writing that Berg's harmony remained strongly expressive and "at all times dualistic, or if you will, historical", retaining "dissonance in music that long since seems to have sacrificed consonance as well as dissonance." Berg's "dramatic quality", he added, was "in microcosm in the cells of his harmony", comparing the second of Berg's Clarinet Pieces to Marie's ostinato pedal murder scene.) For example, he repeatedly uses the low-register fifth G–D as a stabilizing pedal point that links Marie and the Drum Major and imparts brief tonal grounding to otherwise nontonal passages. The tritone B–F fatefully recurs at the curtain and throughout to signify Wozzeck's torment, especially tension with Marie and, to a lesser extent, the Captain.

At the same time, Berg uses such focal pitches and often register for frame of reference and added meaning. For example, the single pitch B symbolizes the murder and dominates that scene. Soft at the end of act 2, when Wozzeck, beaten, whispers "einer nach dem andern" (one after the other), B crescendos repeatedly and expands from unison B_{3} into octaves: Marie's last cry ("Hilfe!", or "Help!") spans two, from B_{5} to B_{3}. (As B is here, so is F a pedal in Wozzeck's death scene.)

"Wir arme Leut" motif

Leitmotifs frame the Captain, Doctor, and Drum Major, whose music recurs when Marie muses on him. Wozzeck sings one tracing a minor chord with an added major seventh, set to the text "wir arme Leut" (we poor people, act 1, scene 1). A related motif signals his hurried entrances and exits. Marie's motifs convey sensuality, as when she accepts a pair of earrings from the Drum Major.

Berg regularly combines all of these elements musicodramatically, forming a complex web that links characters and events. For example, when Wozzeck confronts Marie in act 2, scene 1, fragments of the Drum Major's motifs sound over a repeated G–A bass figure adapted from Wozzeck's "wir arme Leut" motif, and Marie's replies recall the rowdy march scene over a G–D–A pedal.

==== Altered idioms ====
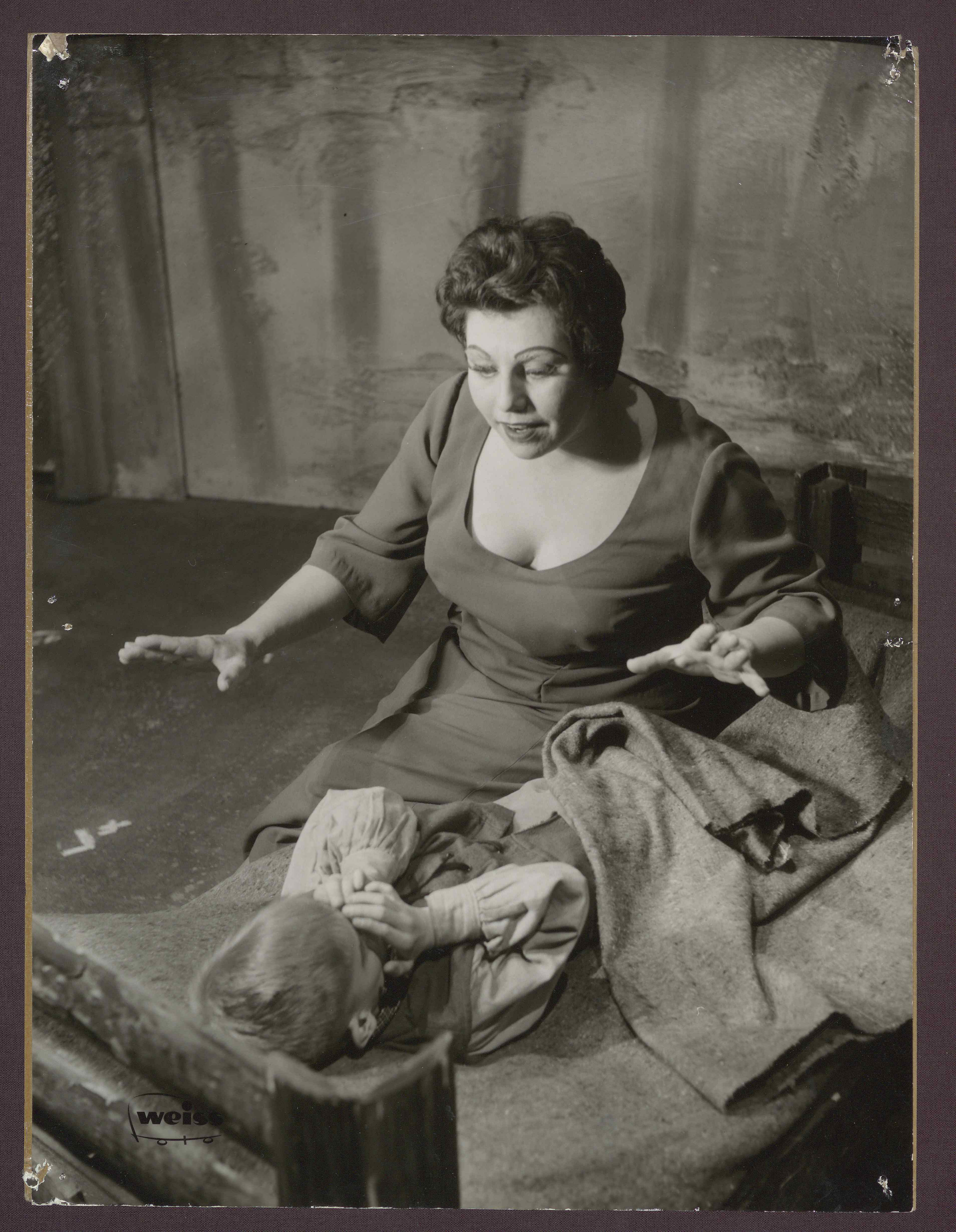
In Marie's Bible scene, she alters the lullaby she sings to her son, scaring him (Maria Graf)

Altered idioms and Expressionist music convey Wozzeck's and others' lived experience, especially his madness and alienation. Folksong and popular dance idioms appear in the field and tavern scenes. In the later tavern episode (act 3, scene 3), Berg transforms a polka into a danse macabre. Its opening rhythm retrogrades a tango, alluding to Kraus's play Die letzten Tage der Menschheit (1915–22; The Last Days of Mankind), drafts of which appeared in Die Fackel by 1916. In the epilogue, Marie's orphan plays among children singing "Ringel, Ringel, Rosenkranz, Ringelreih'n" (like "Ring a Ring o' Roses").

Berg's sketches for Wozzeck (and the Three Pieces for Orchestra march) included notes on his military service and Austrian army bugle calls rendered atonal in the final score (act 1, scene 2). His experience sleeping in barracks informed the snoring soldiers' chorus (act 2, scene 5), based on their "polyphonic breathing, gasping, and groaning ... like some primeval music that wells up from the abysses of the soul", he recalled.

Berg also adapted tonal juvenilia. In Marie's Bible scene, he reworks a melancholy, Schumannesque sonata fragment in F minor. The final interlude is from a 1909 piano piece for Helene or a planned 1912 symphony on Honoré de Balzac's 1834 novel Séraphîta.

=== Musicodramatic synopsis ===
Berg saw opera as drama intensified through music, which in Wozzeck he used to embody (as motives, rhythms, and pitches), intricately structure, and focus Büchner's text. In 1930, asked whether "the text ... facilitates the understanding of your music", which the interviewer said "the public ... grappl[ing] with ... finds unfamiliar", Berg asserted the music's and drama's reciprocal relationship: "Yes, but also the reverse. The music also aids in understanding the poem. Basically I have done nothing more than to produce it on a higher level." The music, he added, "neutralize[s] the [text's] fragmentary character".

==== Act 1 ====
There is no overture, only a brief symbolic introduction (mm. 1–3). The opening D-minor tone cluster crescendos softly in the strings, collapsing in glissandi to a more compact A♭-minor cluster, the verticalized leitmotif associated with Wozzeck's hurried entrances and exits. (Note: The melodic motion, a major seventh, is often used for ecphonesis. The overall voice leading moves through all intervals.) The whole chromatic is completed, with the eleventh pitch in the oboe and the twelfth in the bassoon. A wind quintet melodically suggests shifting, ambiguous harmonies as the curtain rises (m. 4).

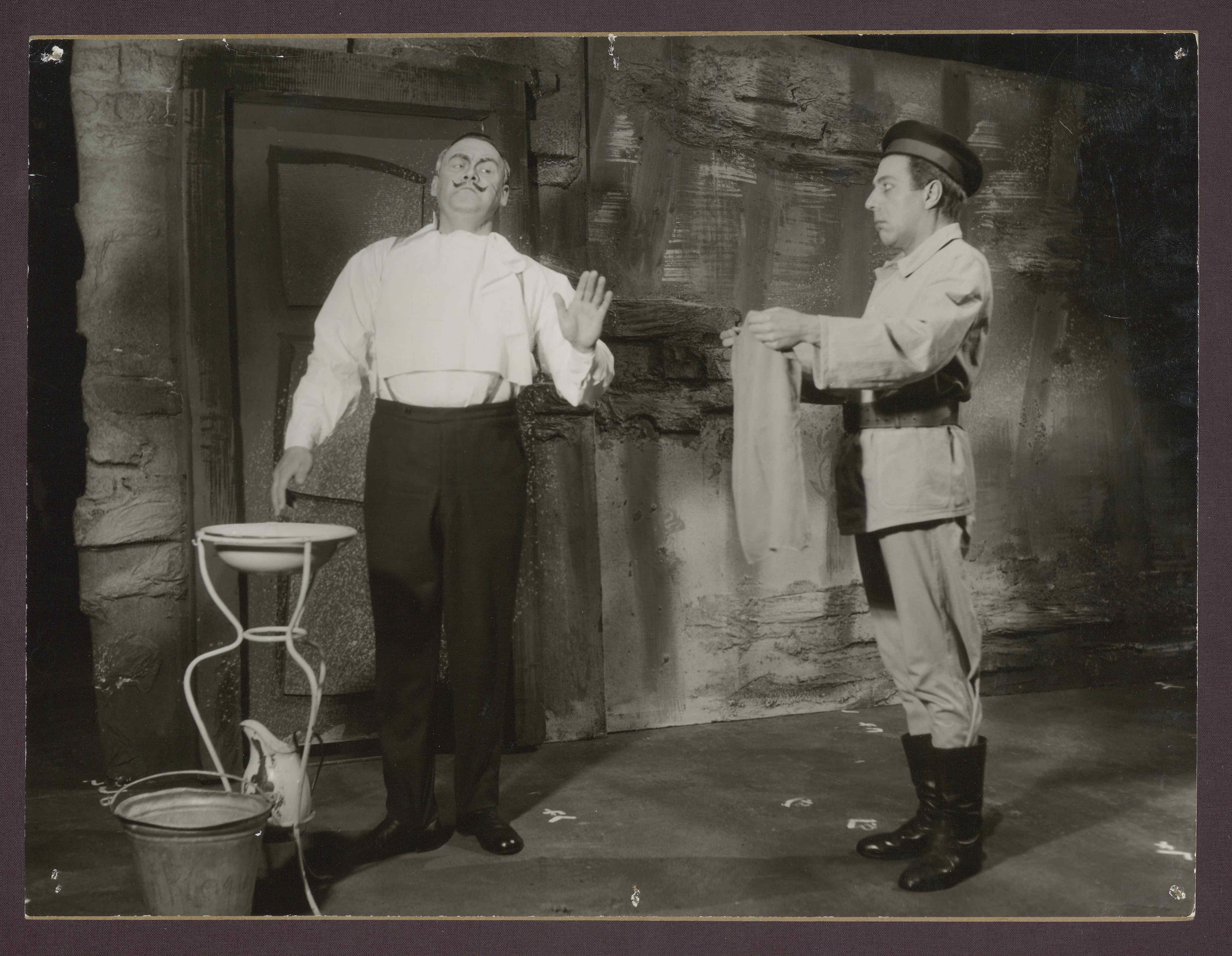
The Captain lectures Wozzeck as wind blows outside

Scene 1 (Suite) unfolds in episodes of obbligato part-writing. In the suite's prelude, Wozzeck shaves the Captain, assenting in monotone to orders to go "slowly! One thing after the other!" In the suite's stately pavane, the Captain ruminates on eternity in analogy to a mill wheel, painted with eight descending fourths (or the circle of fifths). In the viola cadenza, he rhythmically mocks Wozzeck's assents like a verbal taunt, calling Wozzeck a "good man". But to the contrabassoon cadenza, he adds that Wozzeck has "no sense of morality" and scorns Wozzeck's nonmarital son in falsetto as winds mimic a church pipe organ.

In the suite's double, Wozzeck quotes Mark 10:14. In the suite's air, over expressive diminished seventh chords spanning the whole chromatic, he makes a universal claim: morality is hard for "poor folk like us", who, like the Captain, are only "flesh and blood". (Note: That is, perhaps Wozzeck cannot afford to marry, or, implicitly, that authorities circumscribed soldiers' familial and marital relations. In the 19th and early 20th centuries, to encourage a focus on career duties and decrease welfare spending on paupers and widows, Austrian and German soldiers generally needed permission to marry. Low pay, barracks life, and military regulations could make it practically unattainable even for officers, while enlisted men had a very high suicide rate, perhaps due to mistreatment.) If they reached Heaven, he cries to accented triads that pop and crack across the whole chromatic, "we'd all have to manufacture thunder!" Unnerved, the Captain again calls Wozzeck a "good man", adding that he "think[s] too much!" and dismissing him with another "go slowly", set to the prelude in reverse. In a brief interlude, this material is transformed, building to climax as the curtain rises again.

Rhapsody chords gravitate to C

Scene 2 (Rhapsody and Hunting Song): In a rhapsody on three chords evoking tonic, dominant, and subdominant, Wozzeck and fellow soldier Andres gather firewood at sunset. "This place is accursed!" says Wozzeck repeatedly, fearing its toadstools (poisonous mushrooms) and recounting a tale of someone who died three days and nights after finding a severed head there. As a foil, this alternates with strophes of Andres's rustic Jagdlied (hunting song) in 6/8, sung on the first two chords as if in G major (increasingly off-key as he becomes uneasy).

Unassuaged, Wozzeck describes a hollow Earth, a firestorm, and a "crashing noise coming down, like trumpets". "Are you mad?", Andres finally asks. All is still, as if the world were dead, Wozzeck murmurs, as drums are heard and bugles signal from town. Andres urges they leave before dark. The music segues as the scene changes. Clarinets mimic distant bugles. A funeral march begins as they retreat, descending in a lament bass from C to F as the curtain falls. This march is transformed when a military band nears as the curtain rises.

Scene 3 (March and Lullaby): This rowdy band marches toward Marie's window, and she joins in song (an altered melody from Mahler's "Revelge"). Across the street, her neighbor Margret teases her about her wandering eye for the soldiers. Marie slams the window shut, quieting the march.

Marie's son, sketch

Her music of open fourths and fifths begins: she sings a self-soothing lullaby to her son. Entranced, she waits for Wozzeck, set to an ostinato (her "waiting" music). It ends on B–F as he knocks on her window. He arrives and shares his visions of the heavens, set to a reprise (mm. 435–6) of scene 2's sunset music (mm. 289–93). As he leaves in a hurry, Marie reminds him to look at their boy. She laments their poverty. He runs to the doctor. The segue develops Marie's motif, the rhapsody chords, and a reminiscence motif from the rowdy military music into a twelve-tone figure.

Scene 4 (Passacaglia): This figure is the passacaglia theme, with 21 variations in three sections. It is a golden afternoon. Wozzeck calls the Doctor "Herr Coffin Nail", and the Doctor scolds him for breaking the paid experimental diet and urine-collection protocol (Wozzeck cannot resist the urge to urinate). Angered, the Doctor medically reassures himself by taking his own pulse, set to music at a somatic ♩= 60. Wozzeck mentions Marie and shares his field visions with the Doctor, including the toadstool constellations (the "lines and circles" mirrored musically).

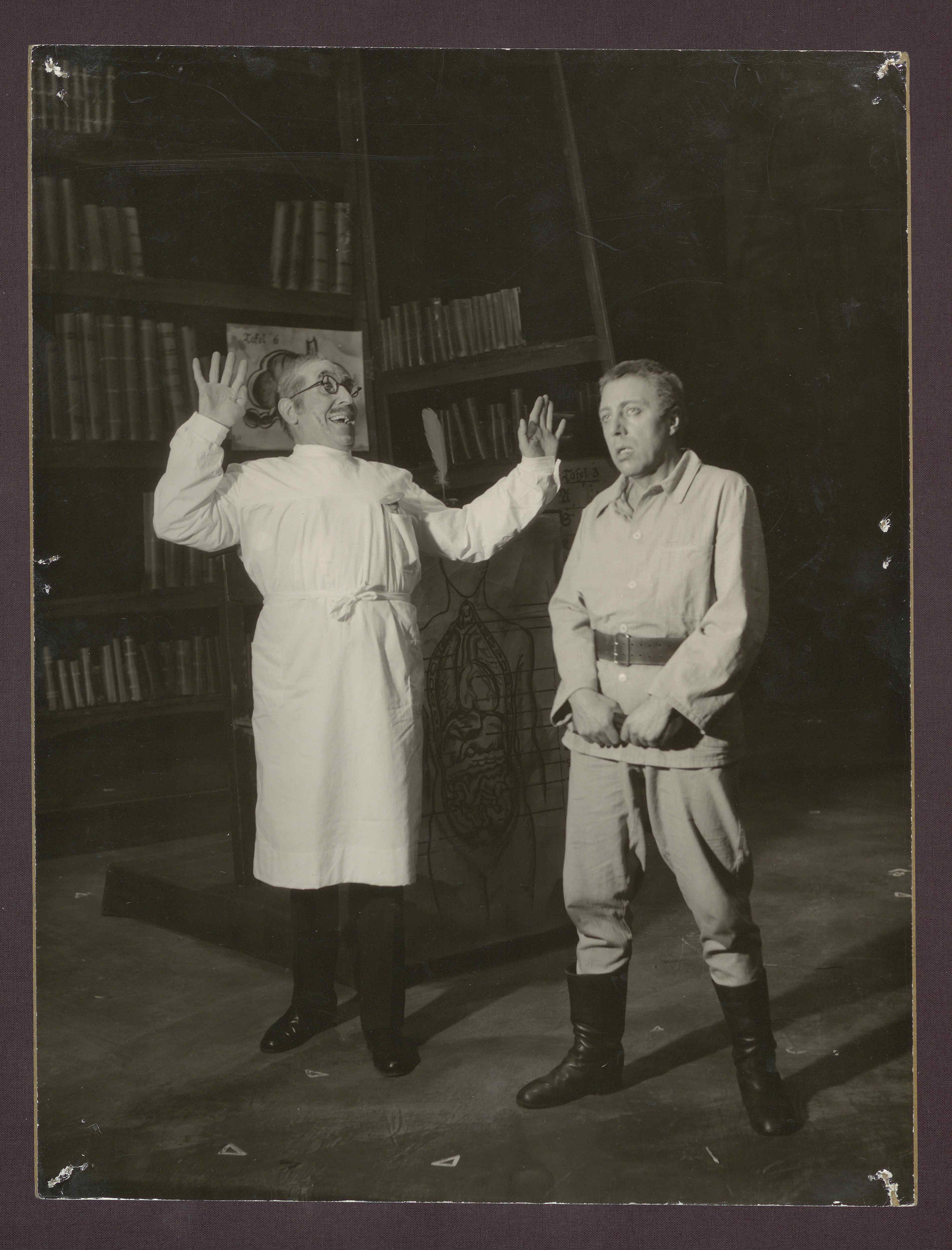
The Doctor is thrilled

The Doctor, set to his motif and a waltz melody, is thrilled. As an ironic comment on obsessions, horn music from the Captain's ruminations accompanies the Doctor's diagnosis of Wozzeck's mental illness ("aberatio mentalis partialis zweite Spezies"). His exclamation about the eternal truth of his scientific theories is marked by the verticalized quartal eternity motif. Finally, he demands to physically examine Wozzeck. As a brief interlude, the passacaglia theme fragments and yields to music from the rowdy march.

Drum Major, sketch

Scene 5 (Rondo): Marie admires the Drum Major from her doorway one evening. The military music continues. They flirt. He makes advances. She briefly struggles to resist him physically, then yields to his seduction and lets him in as the curtain falls with two oscillating chords.

==== Act 2 ====
Scene 1 (Sonata-Allegro): The curtain rises with two oscillating chords. In her room the next morning, set to a motif as the exposition's first subject, Marie wears the Drum Major's gift of earrings, admiring herself in a broken piece of mirror. In the transition, her son stirs awake on her lap. She grimly transforms the lullaby as the second subject, singing of "gypsies" taking children who will not sleep. He hides his face in the coda. In the repeat, Marie returns to the mirror until he stirs again, and she uses shadowgraphy to threaten him with the Sandman.

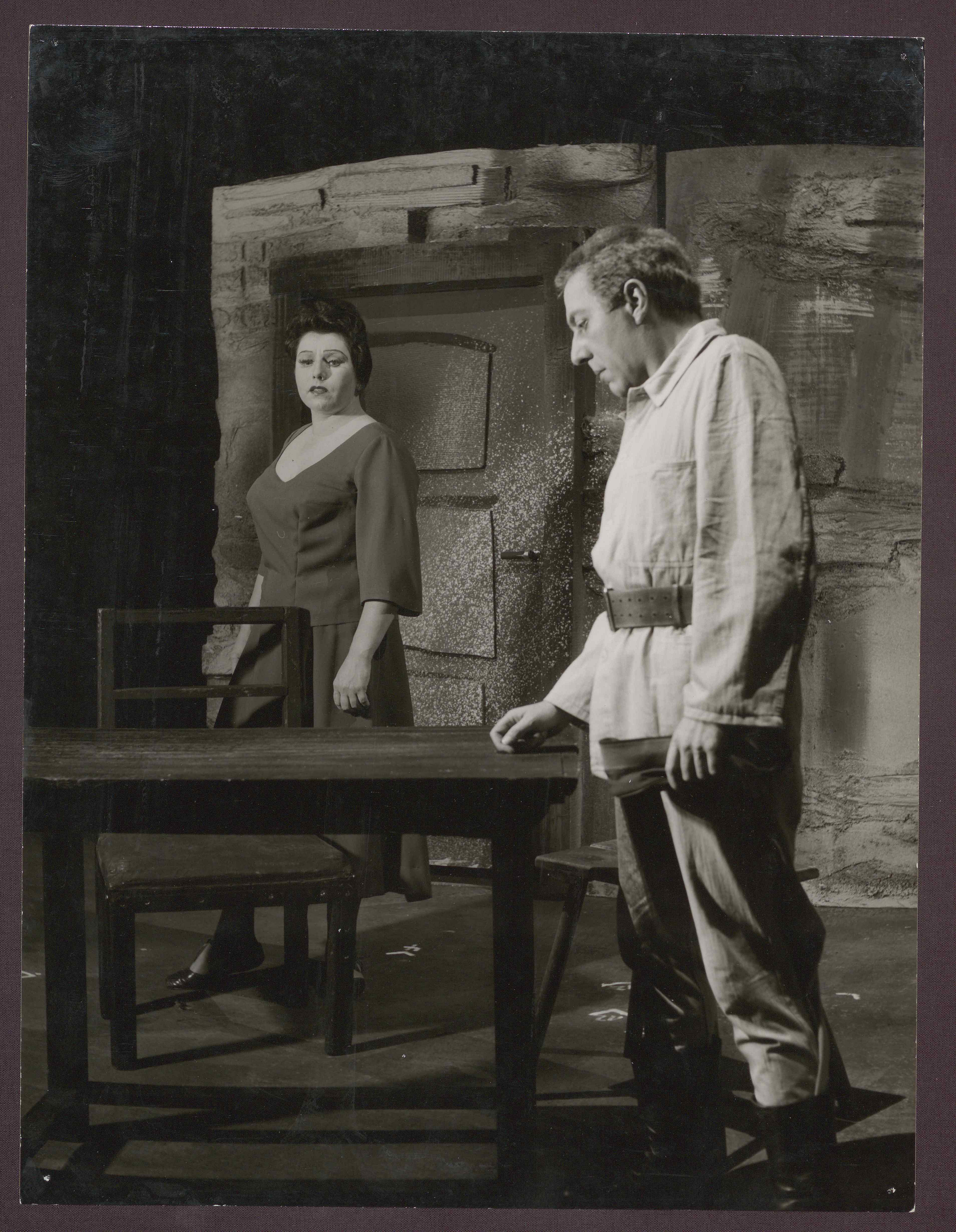
Wozzeck supports Marie

This time in the coda, Wozzeck enters unseen, startling Marie, who tries to hide her earrings in the development. He doubts she found a matching pair, as she claims. A plain C-major triad briefly drones for his affectionate gift of money, and he leaves. She is wracked with guilt in the recapitulation. The music continues without voices, serving as an interlude, before the curtain falls with a C-major glissando.

Scene 2 (Fantasia and Fugue on Three Themes): The curtain rises on a new day with a C-major scale on harp. On the street, as the opening oboe theme returns, the Captain tries to speak with the Doctor, who says he "must hurry" to the obsession motif. "A good man takes his time", says the Captain. Breathlessly chasing, he receives a medical assessment by turns mocking ("bloated, fat") and dire (risk of "apoplexia cerebria", or stroke) to the waltz. In the triple fugue, their leitmotifs (Captain, then Doctor) join a version of Wozzeck's coda music as it dawns on him that they are hinting at the love triangle. A slow chamber-orchestra interlude hints at the next scene's music.

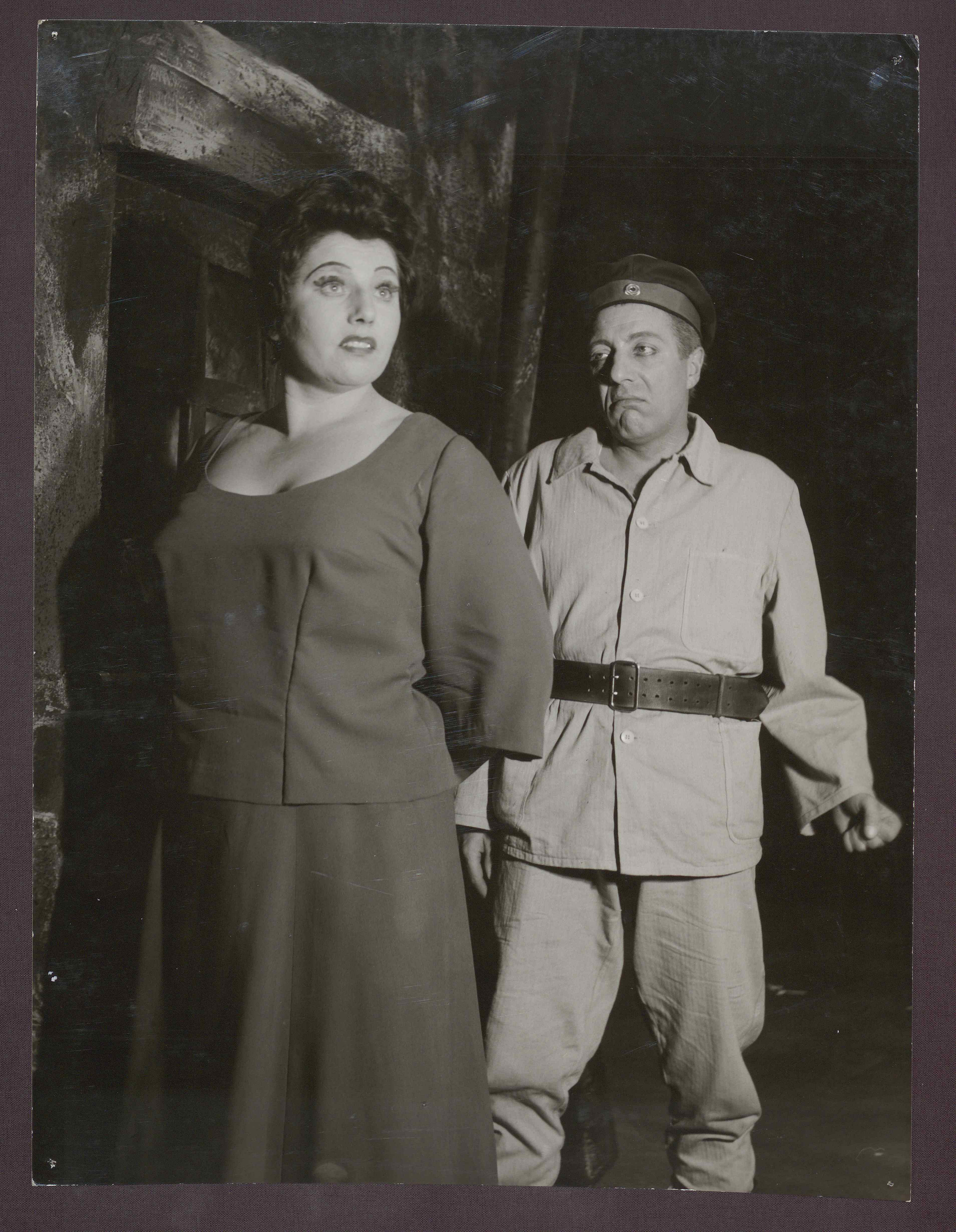
Wozzeck gazes at Marie and makes a fist

Scene 3 (Largo): It is overcast. Wozzeck arrives to confront Marie at her door to music scored like Schoenberg's Chamber Symphony No. 1. She halfheartedly denies it amid rowdy military music. Enraged, he nearly strikes her. "Don't touch me", she cries to music echoing her struggle with the Drum Major. "Better a knife in my heart", she moralizes to a chromatic wedge symbolizing the knife, "than dare to lay a hand on me". Struck by the suggestion, Wozzeck flees. The prior interlude's undulating music reverses into the next scene's slow Ländler.

Scene 4 (Scherzo with two trios): Two novices sing drunken solos for patrons at a Heuriger (Viennese garden tavern). Rowdy seduction music recurs in her waltz with the Drum Major as Wozzeck watches. A hunter's chorus sung by soldiers, another song from Andres, and a drunken sermon interrupt. The band resumes, but an Idiot walks into Wozzeck, slurring, "Everyone is happy, but it stinks of blood". Wozzeck dissociates. Erratic dance music accelerates past the curtain fall, halting as a men's chorus is heard in a faint vocalise of the rhapsody chords.

Drum Major, sketch

Scene 5 (Introduction and rondo): This strange chorus, the curtain slowly reveals, is soldiers snoring in a guardhouse barracks. Wozzeck tosses and turns, haunted by thoughts of Marie and the Drum Major dancing. He seems to hear the tavern songs outside as music from the hollow Earth recurs. After seeing the knife in a vision, he prays, set to the field scene music. But the drunken Drum Major comes boasting and fights him to music from Marie's struggle. Wozzeck falls as oscillating music fades to a final low B on harp.

==== Act 3 ====
Scene 1 (Invention on a theme): Wracked with guilt, Marie reads the Bible by candlelight, including the pericope of Jesus and the woman taken in adultery, set to a theme and variations. Her son clings to her as she tells him a grim fairy tale. Then, searching for a passage on Mary Magdalene, she reads about the sinful woman and begs for mercy, set to a double fugue on the bisected theme. In the interlude, the theme is developed before fading to a chilling harp-and-celesta arpeggio over the fateful pitch B.

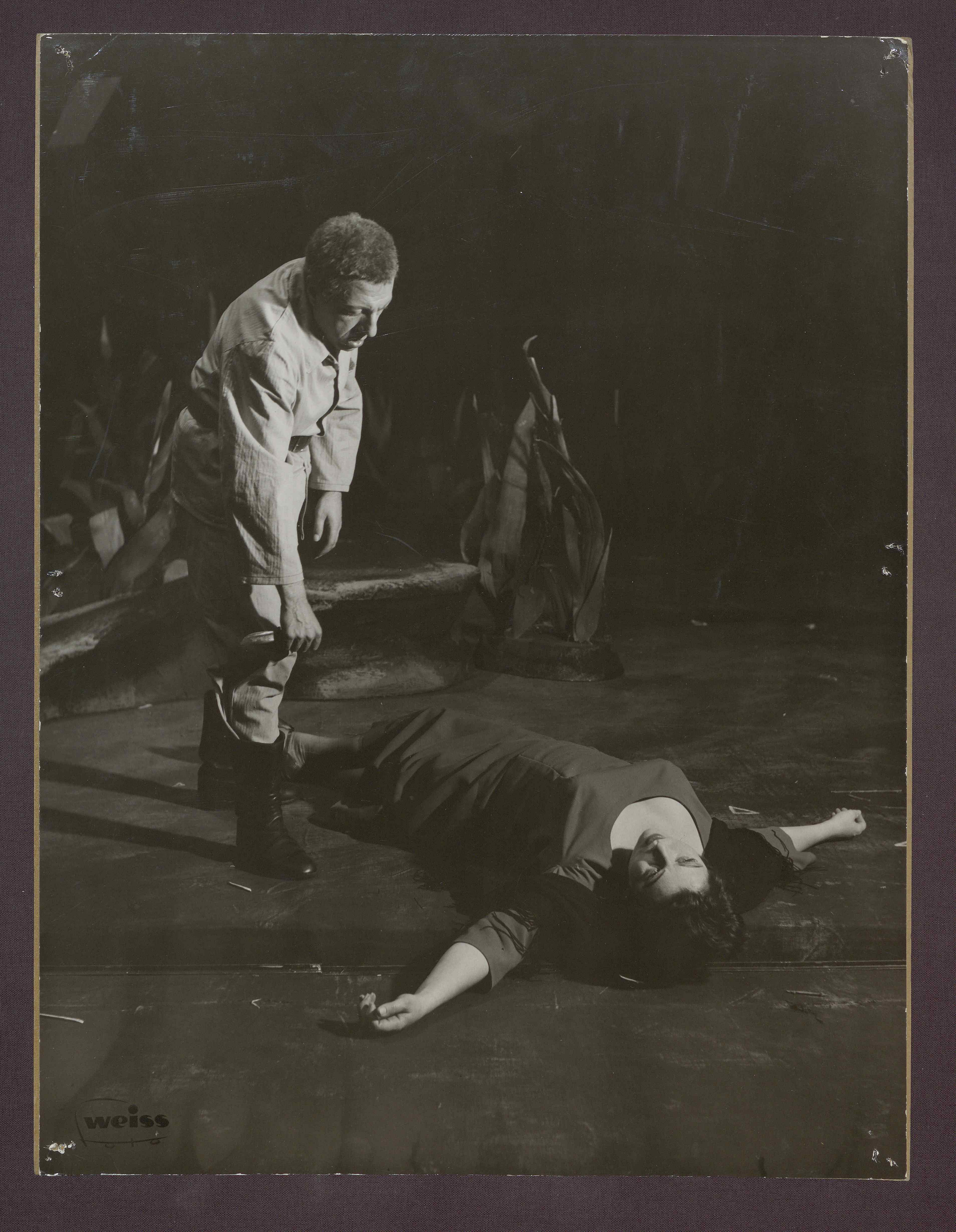
Wozzeck gazes at Marie's body

Scene 2 (Invention on a single note, B): Wozzeck and Marie talk uneasily at a forest pond. A red moon rises. He pulls his knife to a crescendo on B and cuts her throat, letting her fall dead to music amassing her motifs. In the interlude, a twofold crescendo, divided by the hexachord and a jangling rhythm, blasts on B until the curtain rises.

Scene 3 (Invention on a rhythm): Everyone revels drunkenly as Wozzeck and Margret dance to a polka on an out-of-tune tavern piano. He pulls her onto his lap, insults her, and demands that she sing. Others see blood on him and raise alarm. He runs. In the interlude, the rhythm repeats against itself, followed by a half-climax that breaks off on an altered chord (m. 219).

D minor is prepared at length

Scene 4 (Invention on a hexachord, m. 220): Wozzeck tosses his knife into the pond. Clouds unveil red moonlight, cast like blood on Wozzeck and the water. The music mimics croaking toads. Intending to bury the knife deeper and to wash clean, he drowns, perhaps by suicide. The hexachord is transposed down (m. 302). The Captain and Doctor, walking slowly nearby, are disturbed by the sound of drowning, which the music mimics. They return to town. The music shifts into tonality.

Interlude (Invention on a tonality): A musical catharsis opens forcefully in D minor with whole tones (m. 320). It modulates to F major, followed by a section amassing Wozzeck's motifs. At the climax (m. 364), a fully chromatic dominant sonority, built from three superimposed 3-cycles, crescendos into the "wir arme Leut" motif as the harmony resolves in D minor (m. 370).

Scene 5 (Invention on an eighth-note moto perpetuo, quasi toccata): Children play and sing in the sunny street outside Marie's door the next morning. News of her death spreads. They run to see her corpse. Marie's son appears unaffected as it is shouted at him. Her music recurs in and across continuous eighth notes, evoking a simple, childlike world. He tags along blankly, now an orphan. The music trails off in a loop, framing a cycle of suffering.

== Reception ==
Marie's son rides a hobby horse (Erismann)

Wozzeck is among the most renowned 20th-century modernist operas, holding a position like Tristan und Isolde's in the 19th century. (Note: John Deathridge called Wozzeck "one of the undisputed masterpieces of modern opera".) Audiences have long responded to its emotional force and residual post-romanticism, and it has captivated musicians as a work that rewards musical analysis. (Note: Lulu accrued less interest as its third act was initially unavailable.) Its dissonant, psychological idiom recalls Schoenberg's Erwartung, and its tormented, outcast antihero has prompted comparisons to operas with similar male title roles, such as Giuseppe Verdi's Macbeth and Nabucco, Modest Mussorgsky's Boris Godunov, and Benjamin Britten's Peter Grimes. (Note: Wozzeck has also been called more "highbrow" than Grimes, sometimes polemically.) Its hybrid form has been compared to that of Paul Hindemith's Cardillac, Ferruccio Busoni's Doktor Faust, and Strauss's Ariadne auf Naxos.

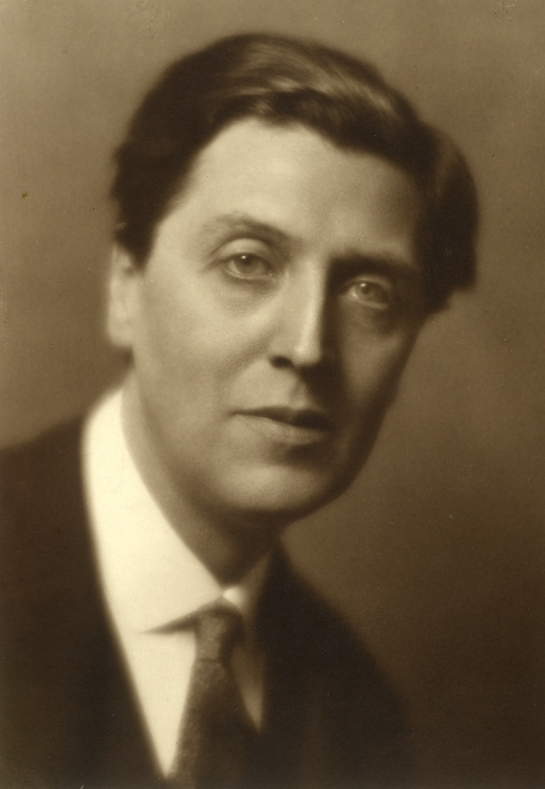
Berg, 1927 (Georg Fayer)

As Wozzeck became a repertoire standard apart from its original context, Berg's critical engagement with militarism and war receded. Its social topicality may always have been partly contextual, enabling it to function critically in a manner immanent to its reception. Berg focused on the music but backed Alexander Landau's 1926 socialist reading of Wozzeck's suffering as collective and calling for action, not blame. Berg also studied his dramatic figures as archetypes, like Kraus, Strindberg, and Otto Weininger (and as in Lulu), (Note: Berg briefly entertained an unrealized archetypal operatic trilogy: Wozzeck, the servant; Vincent (van Gogh), the friend (of Gauguin); and Wolfgang (Amadeus Mozart), the master.) and backed Otto Brües's 1929 reading of Wozzeck as Job.

=== Performance history ===
Wozzeck made Berg famous. After its 1925 premiere, within a year of Cardillac, Kurt Weill's Protagonist, and Ernst Krenek's Zwingburg and Der Sprung über den Schatten, it received 27 productions, especially in Germany and Austria, until January 1933, when Nazi Germany suppressed "degenerate music".

==== 1921–24: Promotion and publication ====
Schoenberg saw Wozzeck's Particell (short score) in 1921 and urged Universal Edition's Emil Hertzka to publish the imminent piano–vocal score by Berg's pupils (mostly Fritz Heinrich Klein and also Gottfried Kassowitz): "This is an opera! Genuine theater music! Everything is flawlessly done, as though Berg had never composed anything but theater music!" With funds from dedicatee Alma Mahler and a loan from May Keller, with whom his sister Smaragda had a long-term lesbian relationship, (Note: Smaragda briefly married Adolf Freiherr von Eger, son of the Austrian Southern Railway director, in 1907. Her lesbianism became evident through affairs with diseuse Marya Delvard, actress Erika Stiedry-Wagner, and her sister-in-law Alice Berg. She also competed with Berg for Helene. They accepted her. Helene wrote Berg, "Did I come out and say that same-sex love was degenerate? ... Let's call it a love of beauty." Still, when Berg sought the blessing of Helene's marital father, he wrote that Smaragda's sexuality was his family's "desperate sorrow". Berg altered the form and text of Frank Wedekind's plays in Lulu to humanize the lesbian Countess Geschwitz, whose near-final music has two motifs linked to Marie in Wozzeck: the "waiting" ostinato and an F♯–G–B–C♯ chord.) Berg paid Universal Edition to print private piano–vocal score copies in 1922. He sold few but sent many to critics, conductors, and theaters in early 1923.

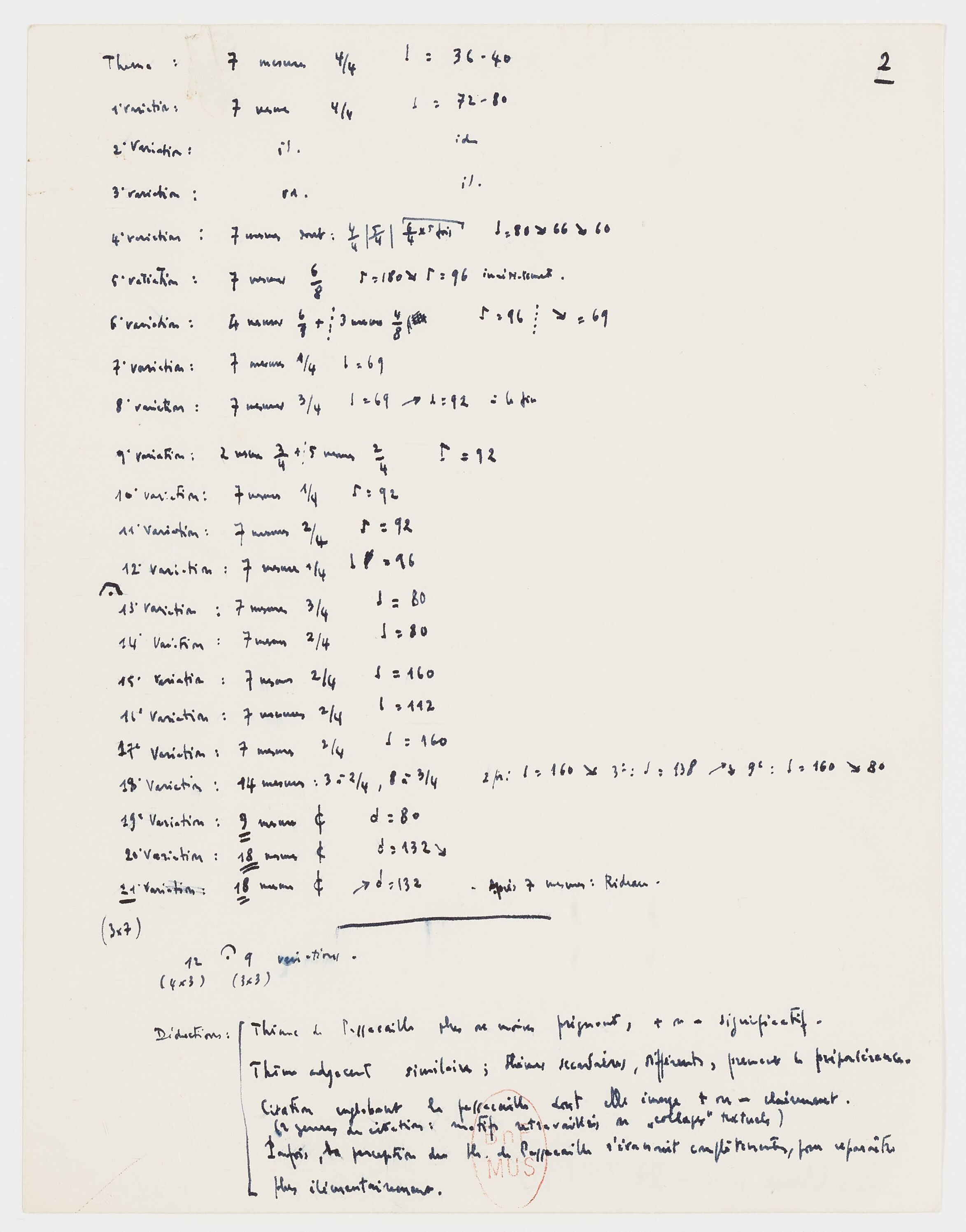
Fritz Heinrich Klein probed Wozzeck's form

That April, Die Musik published the lullaby with Ernst Viebig's rapt review, which said Berg's formal innovation opened "new paths", perhaps toward a "truly 'musical opera'" (Wozzeck was not a "conventional 'music drama'", Klein wrote in Anbruch, but had a "new kind of structure" with "all the forms of absolute music" and "formal musical development"). (Note: In 1924, composer Emil Petschnig countered that Berg "simply raises the question [of form in opera] yet again.") Then, in exchange for Wozzeck, Universal Edition published Three Pieces for Orchestra.

That summer, Webern debuted two (Präludium and Reigen) at Heinrich Jalowetz's and Paul Pella's "Austrian Music Week" in Berlin, drawing more press, while Gustav Havemann's Quartet performed Berg's String Quartet at the Salzburg International Society for Contemporary Music festival. There, conductor Hermann Scherchen requested a Wozzeck suite. Berg used the march, lullaby, and Bible scene to create Three Fragments (Note: German: Bruchstücke (lit. 'broken pieces')) for Voice and Orchestra from the Opera "Wozzeck".

In late 1923, Berg had composer Ernst Bachrich play piano excerpts from Wozzeck for conductor Erich Kleiber, who was visiting Vienna. Kleiber agreed to stage it at the Berlin State Opera. Universal Edition deemed this the best premiere offer. Scherchen then premiered the Fragments, originally intended for Berlin, to acclaim at Frankfurt's 1924 Allgemeiner Deutscher Musikverein festival. Adorno attended and was inspired to study composition with Berg.

==== 1925–34: Premieres ====
===== Berlin premiere =====
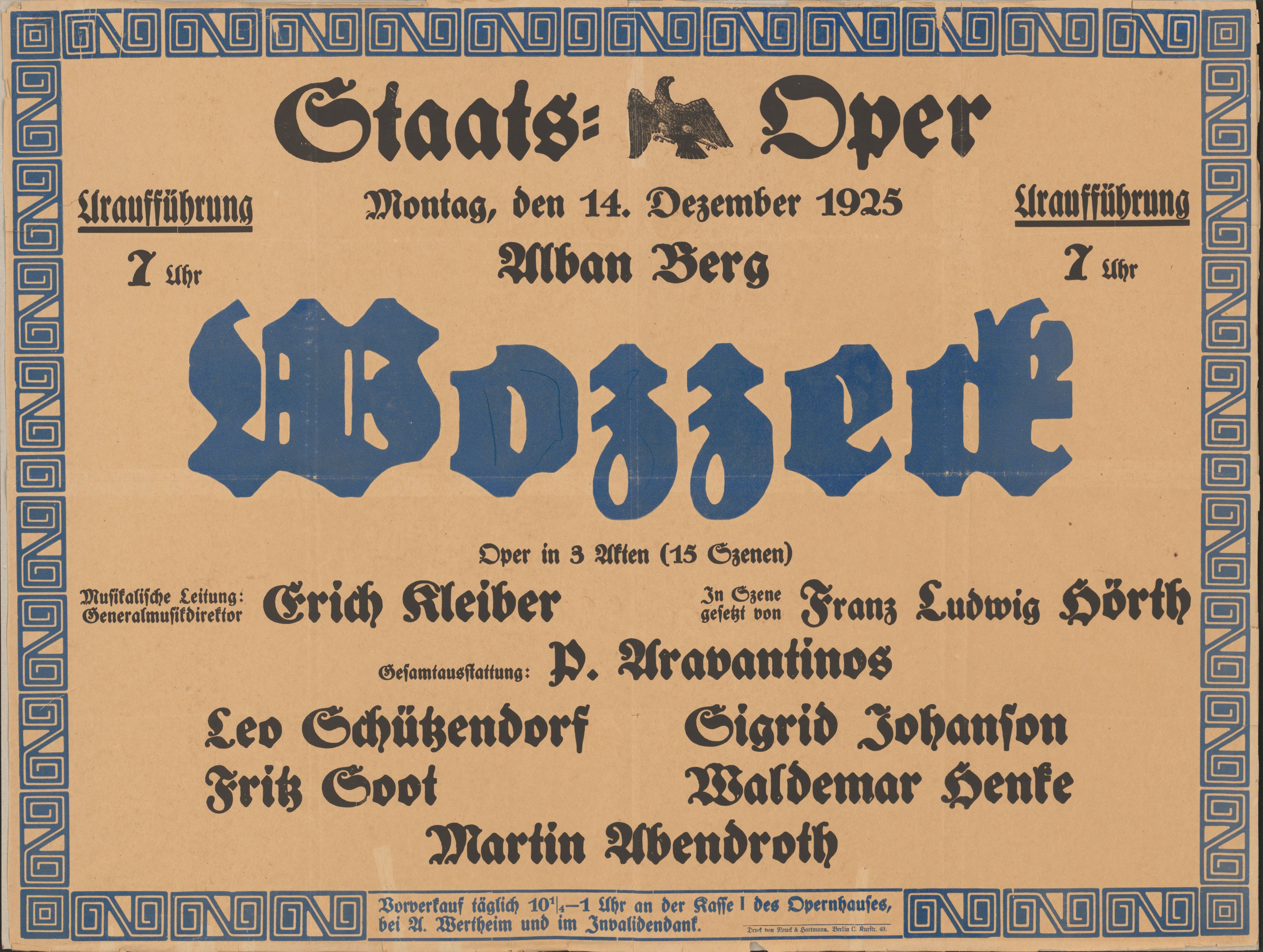
Premiere placard

Berg helped with staging and rehearsals in Berlin. There were at least 137, and Berlin State Opera manager Max von Schillings quit over a possibly related funding clash. Wozzeck was regarded as the first full-scale atonal opera. Music writers including Vienna's Paul Stefan and Prague's Erich Steinhard and composers including Hans Heinz Stuckenschmidt, Adorno, and Stefan Wolpe attended the dress rehearsal. The 14 December 1925 premiere was a succès de scandale with some disruptions.

Wozzeck achieved sustained expressive coherence despite a post-tonal musical language and was covered internationally and extensively. In January 1927, Oslo's Berlin-based Dagbladet critic and Francophile composer Pauline Hall hailed it as a "new stage in German musical development, ... for the first time since Wagner". It showed independence from Schoenberg and equaled Debussy's Pelléas, she added.

===== Gurlitt's Wozzeck =====
The Vienna premiere of Büchner's play also inspired Manfred Gurlitt. Premiered four months after Berg's opera and also published by Universal Edition, Gurlitt's opera Wozzeck discomfited Berg. The two worked independently. Examining Gurlitt's piano–vocal score, Berg found it "not bad or unoriginal" but a weak "broth ... even for arme Leut [poor folks]". Gurlitt's leaner musical textures and polystylism align with Hindemith and Weill, with frequent, socially oriented use of the chorus. His opera may be closer to Büchner's original conception but has remained in the shadow of Berg's. (Note: Gurlitt's Wozzeck was not revived until the 1986–87 season at its Bremen premiere house, where he had served as conductor and music director.)

===== Czech Vojcek =====
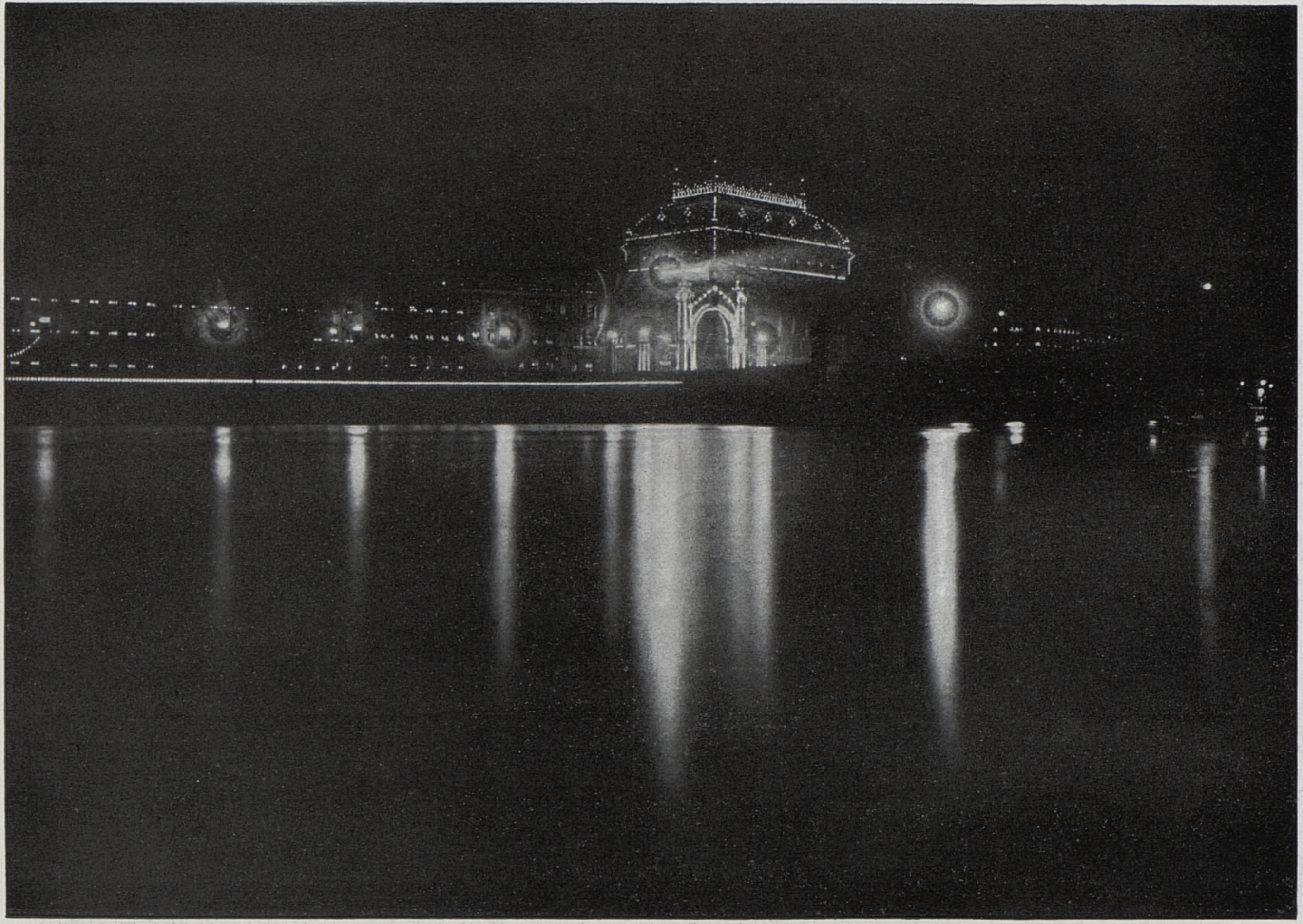
Prague's National Theater on the Vltava, 1907

In May 1925, composer–conductor Alexander Zemlinsky led the Czech Philharmonic in the Fragments. Starting on November 12, 1926, conductor Otakar Ostrčil led Wozzeck's Czech-language premiere, as Vojcek, at Prague's National Theatre, staged by dramatist Ferdinand Pujman and translated by Jiří Mařánek. Critic Oskar Baum wrote in the Prager Presse that the Schoenberg circle's reputation for abstract or "dogmatic" music "evaporates [on] contact". He quoted Berg's impressions at the dress rehearsal:

[T]he translation ... comes so close to the original; it is more the ... spirited presentation ... as though the work in this language has found a more natural ... expression. In ... the soul of the folk, the essential sameness of the human soul in all its national varieties becomes most apparent. [T]he living archetype that Büchner's play evokes ... was most likely a Slavic type. More important ... is the ... musical conduct of this performance, ... which I ... admir[e].

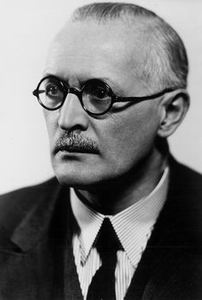
Otakar Ostrčil

On the third night, Berg wrote Adorno, "Czech Nationalists (virtually Nazis)" and "clerical lobbies" staged "purely political!" disruptions: "To them I am the Berlin Jew Alban (Aaron?) Berg. Ostrčil bribed by the Russian Bolsheviks, the whole thing arranged by the 'Elders of Zion' etc." Antonín Šilhan wrote as much in Národní listy, and Emanuel Žak tied the opera's supposed degeneracy to Jewish Bolshevism in Čech, while Zdeněk Nejedlý mocked them, praising Wozzeck in Rudé právo. The city government quickly banned it.

Ostrčil tied the affair to a "reactionary movement", (Note: Brian S. Locke called the "Wozzeck Affair" the "most important event at the Czechs' National Theater in the interwar period".) and in 1927 Berg attributed it to "political issues ... supposedly connected to my artistic outlook". Composer Leoš Janáček said "wrong was seriously done to Berg", calling him a "dramatist of astonishing consequence, of deep truth". In 1930, remembering Janáček and Prague figures who fought the ban, Berg said Czech nationalists viewed Wozzeck as defeatist and Austrian. (Note: Accounts of an "Austrian people" often invoke two origin myths: a typically provincial or regionalist one stressing German descent and a multicultural (traceably Habsburg, more centralist) one, wherein Austria is a German–Slavic–Hungarian–Italian composite with ethnic–linguistic–religious–cultural pluralism. After the dissolution of Austria-Hungary, Slavic peoples often lived in successor states or neighboring countries that absorbed its imperial lands.)

===== Leningrad premiere =====
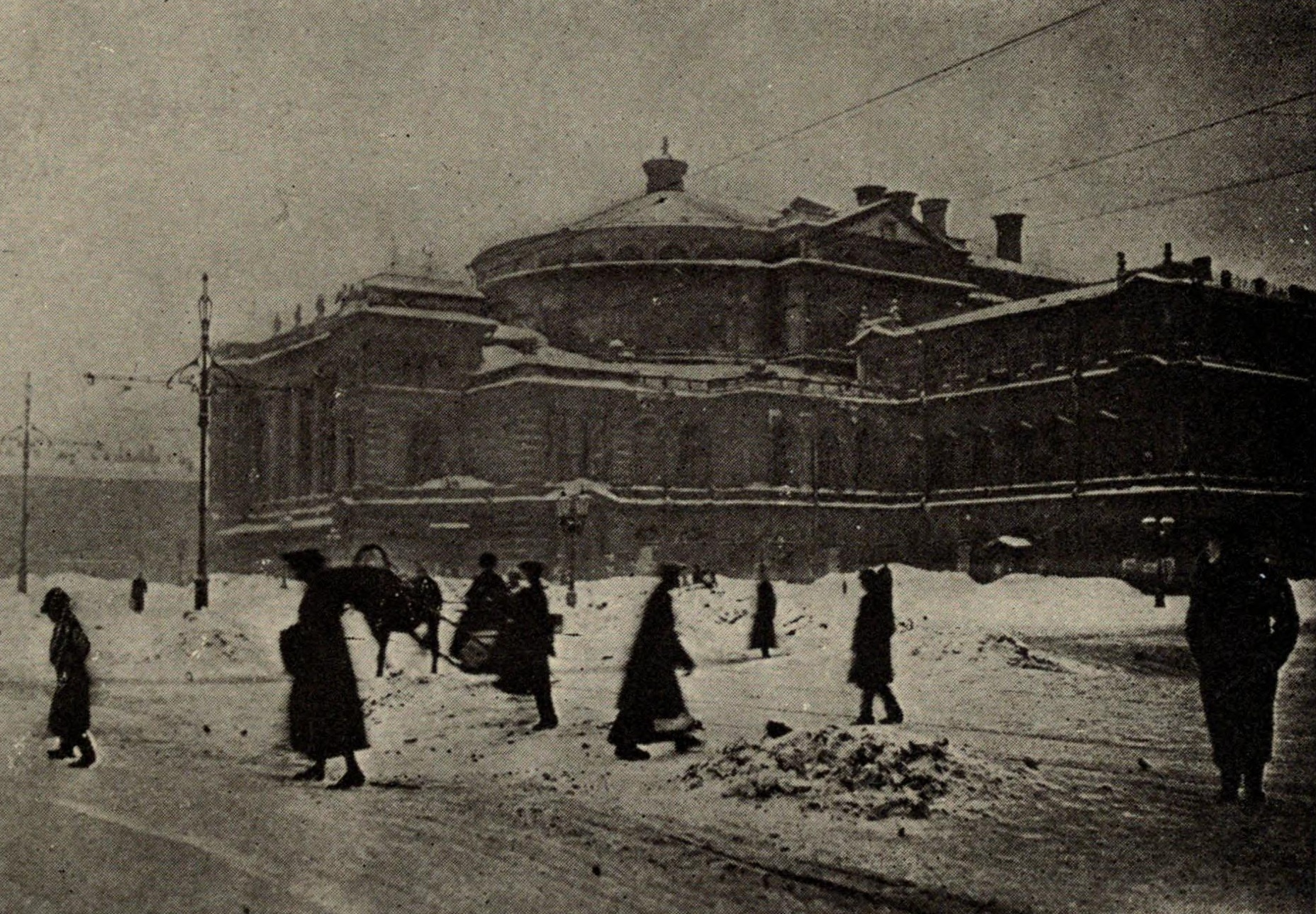
Mariinsky Theatre, 1922

In 1927, the Association for Contemporary Music, spearheaded by Nikolai Roslavets, staged Wozzeck at Leningrad's Mariinsky Theatre with Boris Asafyev's assistance, Vladimir Dranishnikov conducting. Berg rode trains for about three days to attend the first performances, writing journalist Soma Morgenstern that he was "celebrated [as] never ... before". Here Wozzeck was, he continued, "a sensation ... in purely artistic, not political, terms". He wired Helene "huge, tumultuous success", but reviews were mixed. Dmitri Shostakovich attended all eight or nine performances.

===== Arrangement and lectures for regional cities =====
Oldenburgisches Staatstheater conductor Johannes Schüler proved that Wozzeck could succeed in a small-town theater with few rehearsals. Berg had Erwin Stein cut sections from four to three musicians, yielding an orchestra of about 60. Berg first gave his "Lecture on Wozzeck" before this premiere, then in eleven or more cities: in the 1930 interview with Jancke, he said that after ten stagings here and eight in Essen, about ten other theaters planned it, including Cologne, Düsseldorf, Hagen, Lübeck, Stuttgart, Weimar, and Königsberg (now Kaliningrad, as the ADMV festival opera). When interviewed, Berg was in Aachen for Wozzeck rehearsals, following a performance of his Lyric Suite and Schoenberg's music there. Composer Béla Bartók, Jancke noted, had said Wozzeck showed contemporary art music's potential in regional cities.

===== Viennese premiere and polemic =====
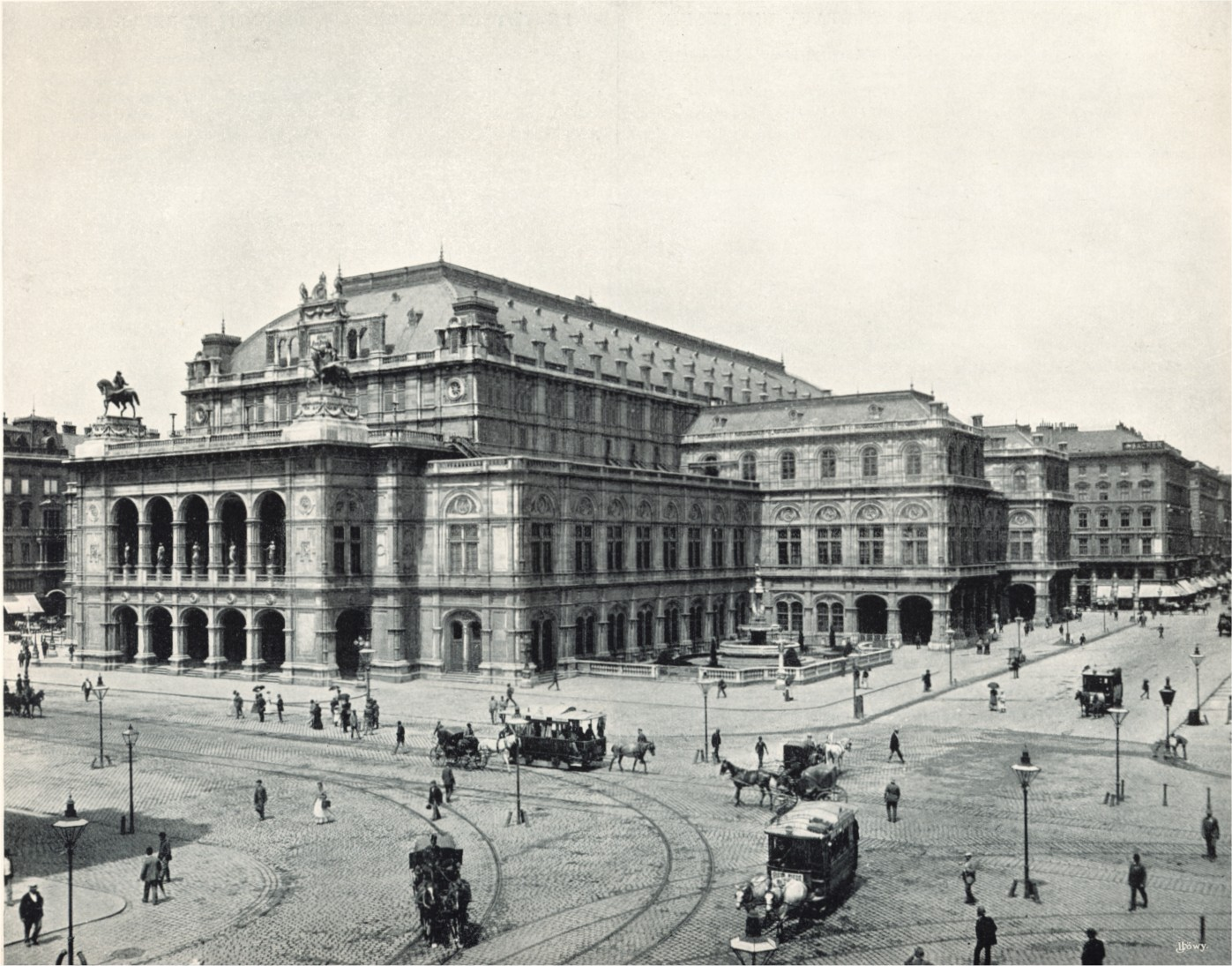
Vienna State Opera, c. 1898

For Wozzeck's 1930 Austrian premiere, led by Vienna's Clemens Krauss, Berg gave tickets to friends, family, and his nonmarital daughter, Albine Wittula. While on better terms with Kleiber, Berg was pleased with Krauss's performance and touched by his opera's hometown success. Webern said he was "shaken to his depths", though he criticized the production as "insufficient". Some called it "art for art's sake" and "unsocial". Neue Freie Presse critic Julius Korngold wrote a polemical review:

If there is ... "atonal" music, it is ... a music that cannot be ... deduced given its fanatic attachment to chromaticism—in both vertical [harmonic] and horizontal [melodic] dimensions. ... [W]e have here "negative composing" ... with its conscious dethronement of the evolving tonal system and rejection of tonal relationships and a tonal center.

Berg replied by defending the Second Viennese School's tradition-based harmonic innovation. Following Schoenberg, he rejected the label "atonal" as denoting loss and argued that music predating the common practice period entailed the possibility of new music afterward. At the same time, he saw his and Schoenberg's music as preserving continuity with old forms, motivic development, the centrality of melody, and loosely triadic elements historically grounded in a long line of chromaticism, from Max Reger and Brahms to Franz Schubert and Mozart.

===== United States =====
In 1930, Kleiber gave the Wozzeck Fragments their U.S. premiere at the New York Philharmonic, priming opera-goers. "Like Debussy in his Pelléas, Berg sought ... to probe the depths of consciousness", Lawrence Gilman wrote in the New York Herald Tribune.

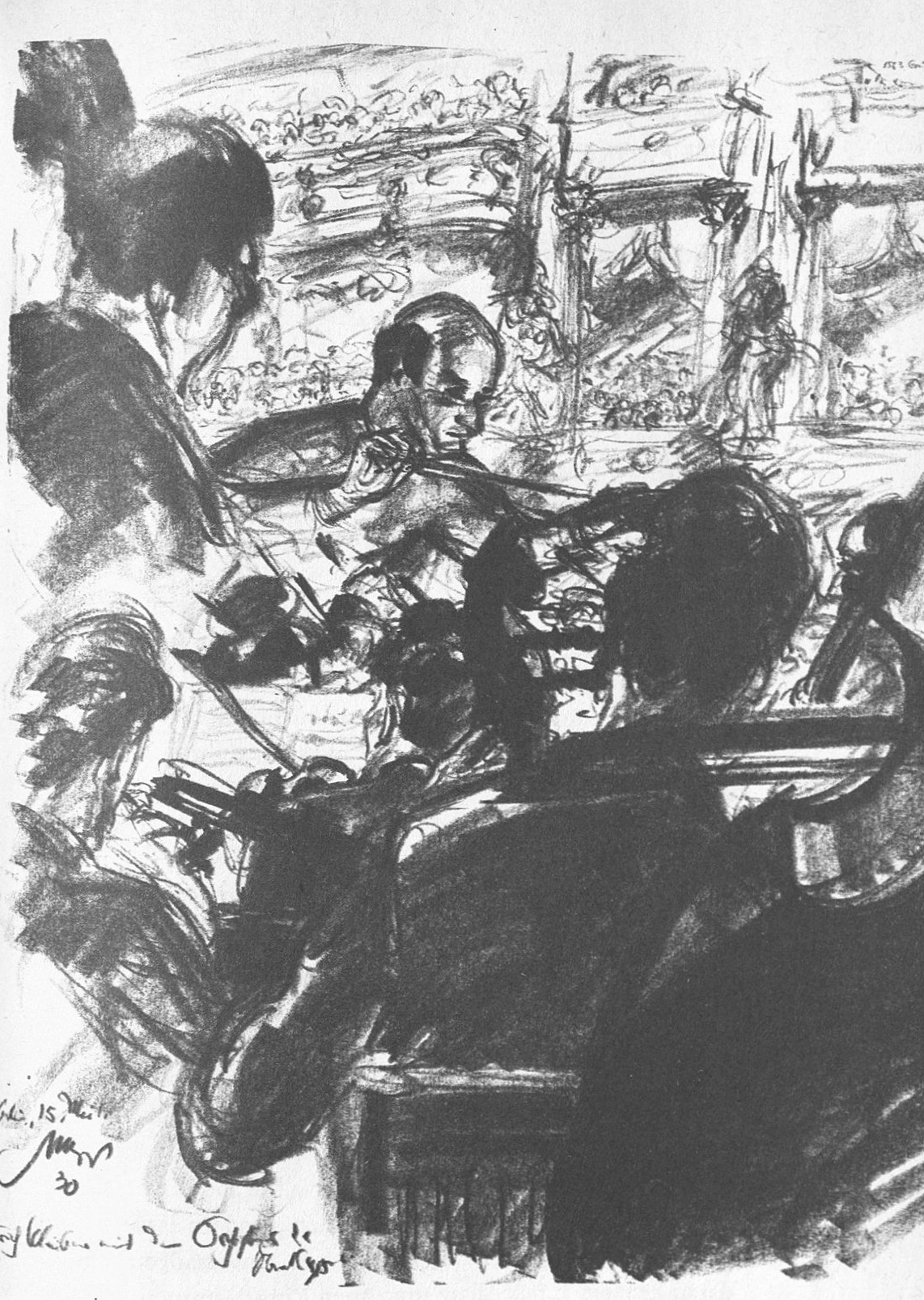
Conductor Erich Kleiber repeatedly championed Berg's music

In 1931, the Philadelphia Grand Opera Company, working with the Curtis Institute of Music and Philadelphia Orchestra, staged Wozzeck's U.S. premiere at Philadelphia's Metropolitan Opera House under Leopold Stokowski. Composer George Gershwin rode a special Wozzeck train from New York: he had met Berg in 1928 via pianist Josefa Rosanska (Josephine Rosensweet, Rudolf Kolisch's soon-to-be wife) when they went to Berg's home to hear the Kolisch Quartet play Berg's Lyric Suite.

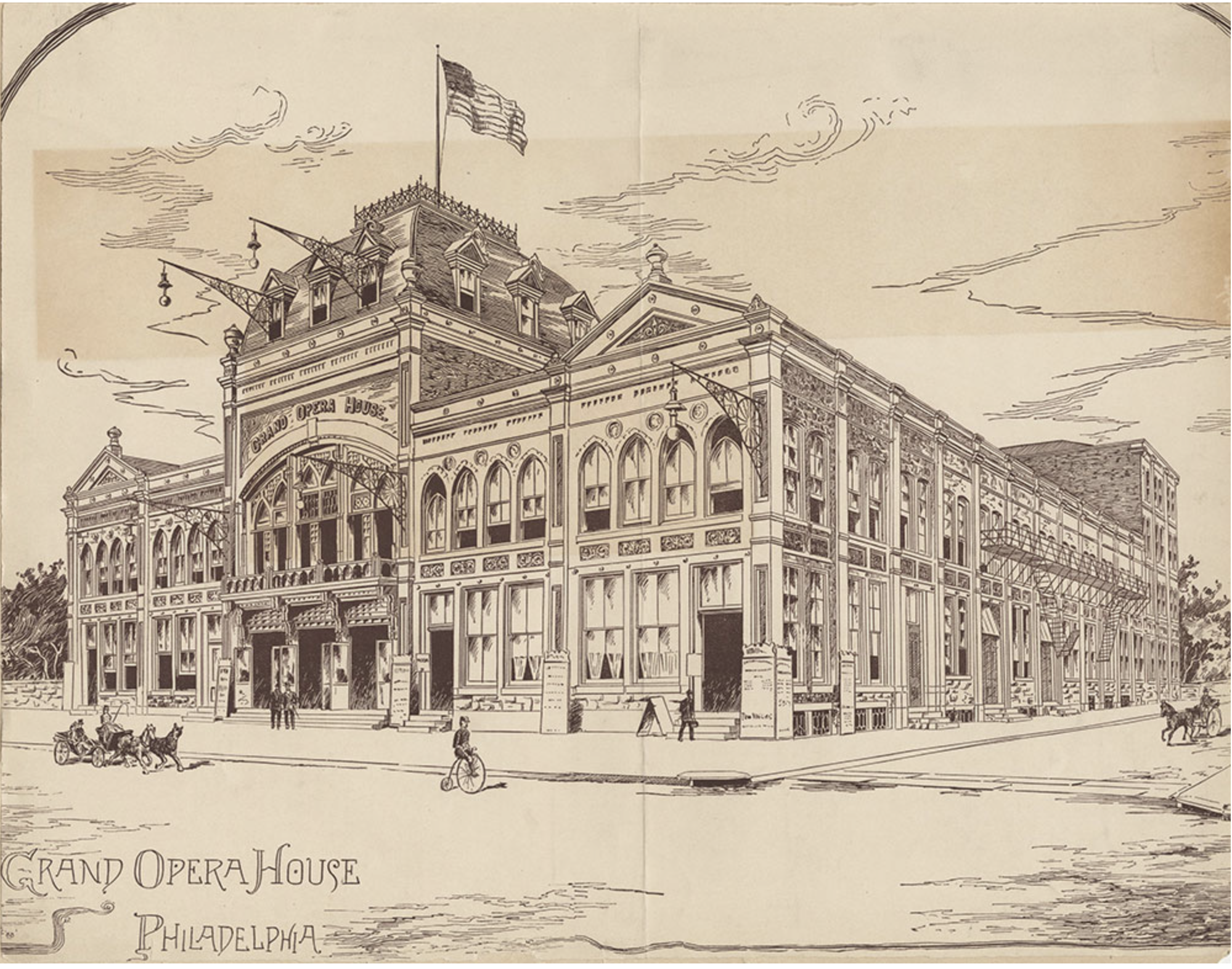
Metropolitan Opera, Philadelphia, c. 1888

Calling the audience "brilliant", The New York Times's conservative critic Olin Downes wrote of an "astonishing" success and hailed Berg's word painting:

You may hear the military band approaching, the crackling and cutting of the wood for the captain's fire, feel the approach of darkness and find reflected in the instruments the sulphurous sky of the field scene, and the setting of the sun. Or you will feel the blinding, insane thought of murder in Wozzeck's brain, and may be conscious, with weird distinctness and psychology of effect, of bubbles rising into the pool into which Wozzeck's body has sunk. All ... synthesized and reflected as in a transparent mirror .... ... [T]his score ... is beautiful.

Gilman agreed:

The layman, if he can accustom himself ... will find ... bitter and piercing loveliness, ... intensity, a compassionate wisdom [and] suffusing tenderness ... reveal[ing] Berg [as a] poet ... a pitiful humanitarian, even (let us whisper it!) a shameless romanticist—a social and spiritual rebel ....

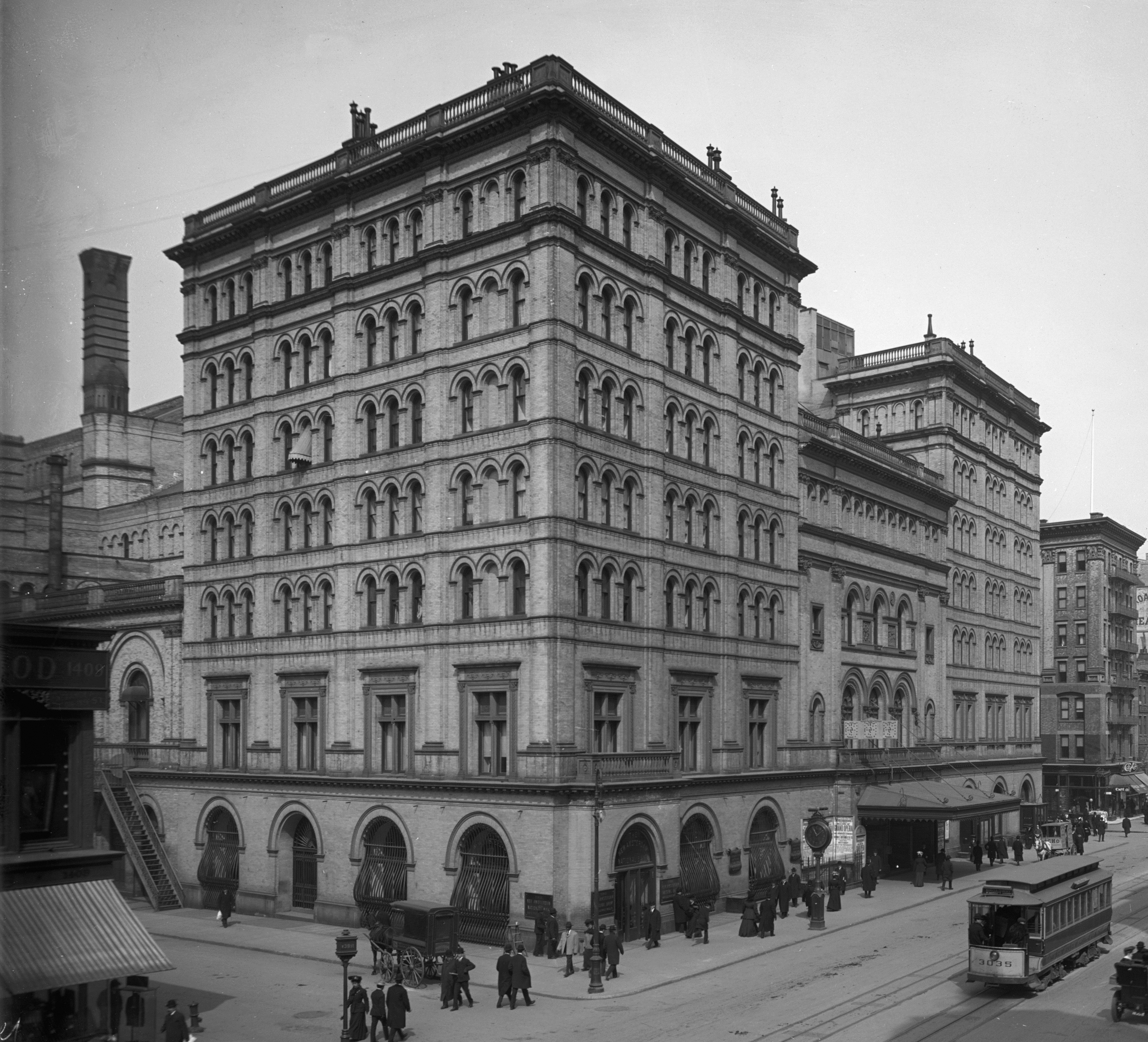
Metropolitan Opera, New York, c. 1905

Later that year, Stokowski's Philadelphia team staged Wozzeck's second U.S. premiere at New York's Metropolitan Opera, prompting another Downes review:

[Berg] is Wozzeck himself, and we ... know Wozzeck's terrors of the strange things ... his premonitions which he cannot explain, of the evil that dogs him, his hallucinations, his murderous revolt. This is the psychological and emotional quality of the music.

===== Further premieres and effect on Berg =====
In 1932, Henry Wood led the BBC Symphony Orchestra in a studio performance of the Wozzeck Fragments broadcast by Schoenberg pupil Edward Clark. In 1934, Adrian Boult conducted Wozzeck in a Queen's Hall concert performance also broadcast by Clark.

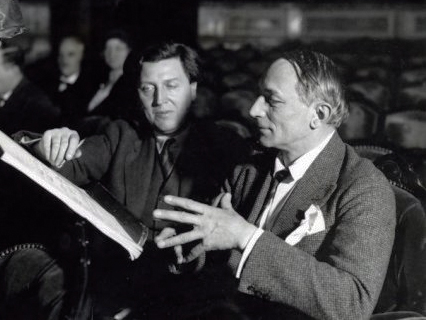
Berg and Brussels conductor Maurice Corneil de Thoran examine Wozzeck's score, 1932

Unlike Schoenberg or Webern, Berg was able to live on royalty payments for his music, mostly from Wozzeck performances in Central Europe. He traveled not only to Germany, Czechoslovakia, Soviet Russia, and England, but also to Switzerland, Belgium, Holland, France, and Italy for performances of and talks about the opera. Busy attending to his success and enjoying independence, he declined vacations with Schoenberg and Schreker's offers of a Berlin Musikhochschule appointment. He benefited from new relationships with Kleiber, Karl Böhm, and Gian Francesco Malipiero, and was appointed to the ADMV jury.

==== 1934–49: Decline and suppression ====
Performances of Wozzeck waned amid rising support for fascism and were suppressed under it. Inflation further harmed Berg's finances. Webern's engagement to conduct the Fragments in Florence was canceled in 1934. Soon after immigrating to the United States that year, Schoenberg helped Berg obtain funds to complete Lulu by persuading the Library of Congress to buy the holograph score of Wozzeck. As a tribute following Berg's 1935 death, Webern almost conducted the Fragments and Berg's Violin Concerto (at its 1936 world premiere in Barcelona) but was overwhelmed in the event.

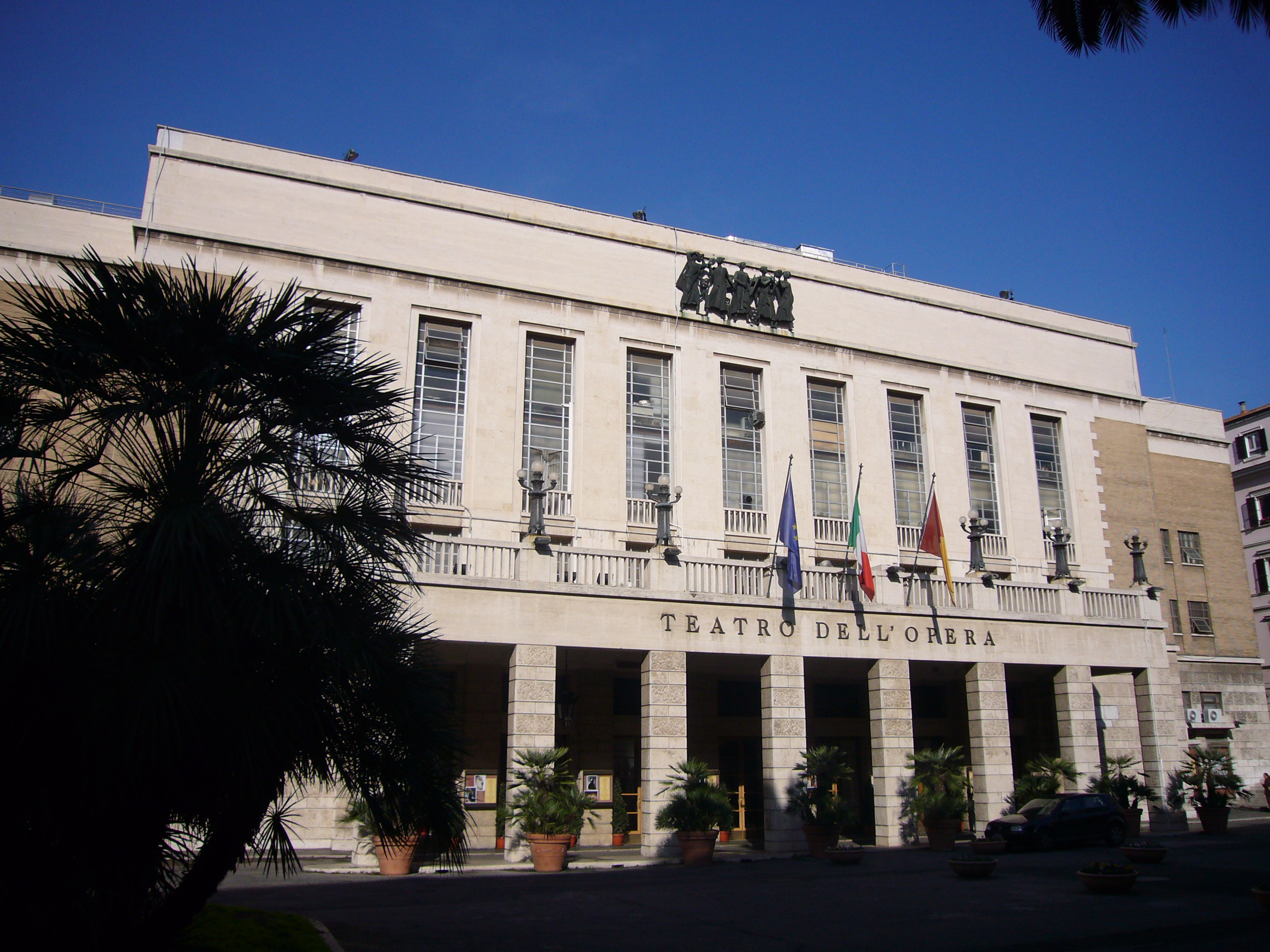
Rome Opera House

Tullio Serafin conducted Wozzeck's 1942 Italian premiere before leaving the Teatro dell'Opera di Roma. (Fascist Italy may have been less hostile to modernist music and less eager than Nazi Germany to suppress it.)

==== 1949–2008: Revivals and later premieres ====
===== Europe, Russia, and Australia =====
Naples's Teatro di San Carlo staged Wozzeck in their 1949–50 season, followed by its first British staging at the Royal Opera House (1952). The Vienna State Opera reinstated it in the 1955–56 season, their first after World War II, under Karl Böhm, as did the Berlin State Opera, and it gradually appeared across Germany, including in Munich. (Note: There were productions at the Staatstheater Augsburg, the Staatstheater Braunschweig, the Theater Dortmund (managed by P. Walter Jacob), the Theater Gießen, the Staatsoper Hannover, the Staatstheater Mainz (with László Anderkó as Wozzeck), the Staatstheater Nürnberg, the Theater Regensburg, the Mainfranken Theater Würzburg, and the Prinzregententheater (led by Ferenc Fricsay).) The Finnish National Opera and Ballet staged it after their 1956 reorganization.

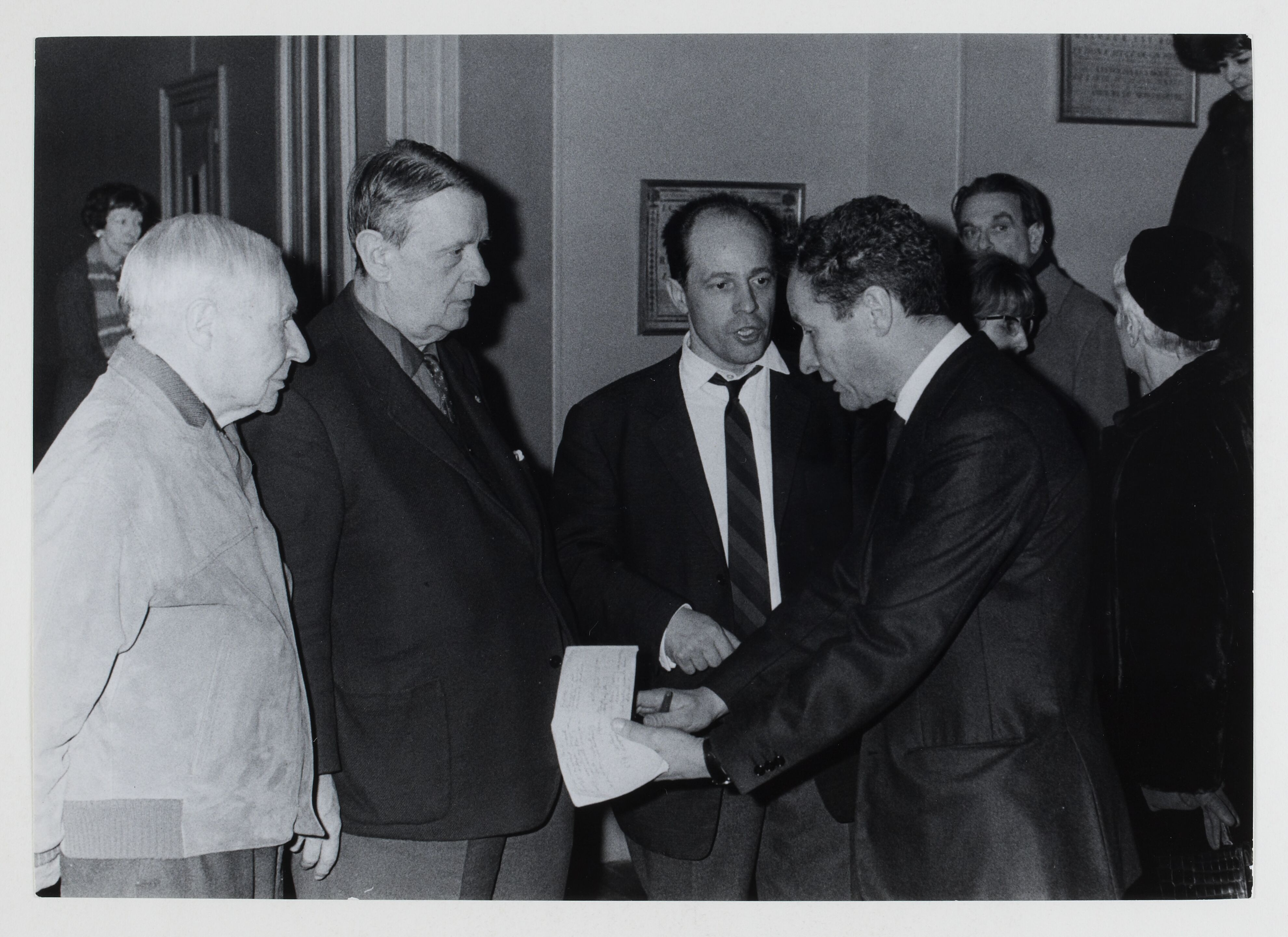
Pierre Boulez led, Jean-Louis Barrault staged, and André Masson set a 1963 Paris Opera production (photo Roger Pic)

In 1962, Paris's Théâtre des Champs-Élysées gave Wozzeck's first French staging. The De Nederlandse Operastichting mounted it in their first season (1965–66), and Herbert Graf staged its Grand Théâtre de Genève premiere. Italian productions included Parma's Teatro di Verdura (1965), the Teatro Comunale di Bologna (1969), and Genoa's Teatro Carlo Felice (1970, after fascist suppression there). The Nederlandse Reisopera and Opera Australia added it to their repertoire in the 1970s. Gerard Mortier staged two revivals at Brussels's La Monnaie in the 1980s, and Parma's Teatro Regio mounted it in 1989.

In the 1990s, Paris's Théâtre du Châtelet, the Opéra national de Montpellier, the Maggio Musicale Fiorentino, and Trieste's Teatro Lirico Giuseppe Verdi presented Wozzeck. Pierre Audi mounted it twice at the Dutch National Opera, and Gian Carlo Menotti engaged Günter Krämer to stage it at Spoleto's Festival dei Due Mondi. Bologna revived it to poor attendance in 1995, and Theater Saarbrücken produced it for Grand Théâtre de Luxembourg's 1995–96 season. It was not restaged in Russia until 2008, after decades of Stalinism and turbulent Germany–Russia relations.

=== Influence ===
==== Krenek ====
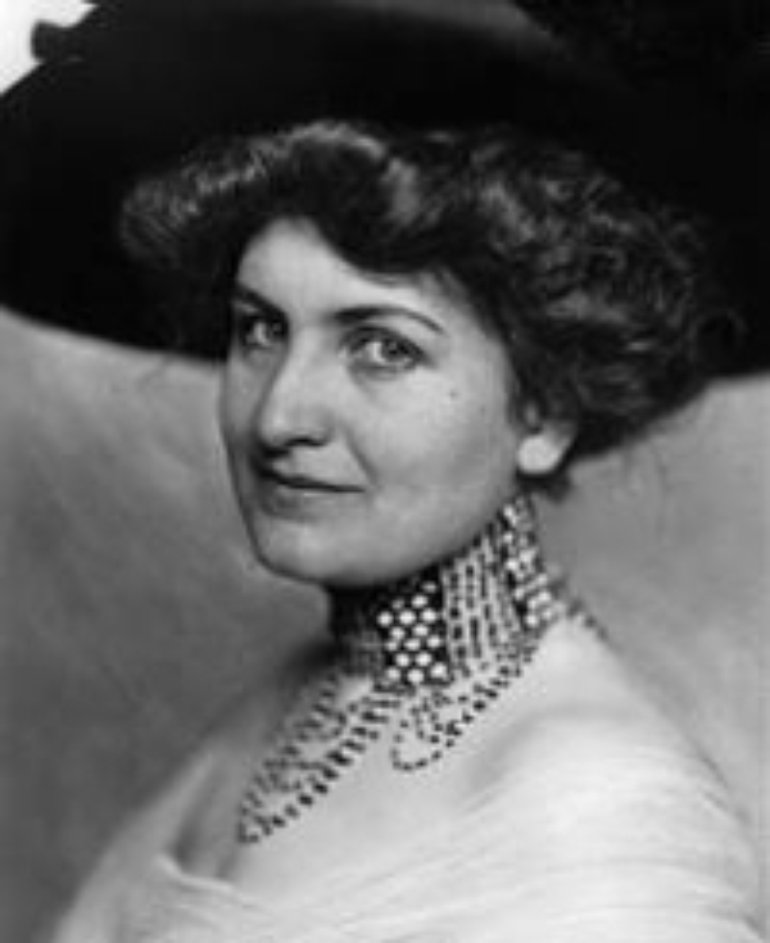
Alma Mahler hosted the Bergs and Ernst Krenek at salons

Berg and Krenek were acquainted at the salons of Alma Mahler, who was a close friend of the Bergs (and the wife or lover of Gustav Mahler, Kokoschka, and Werfel). Krenek studied Wozzeck's piano–vocal score and wrote Berg with praise and questions about vocal writing while working with Kokoschka on Orpheus und Eurydike in 1923. Berg replied with examples from Wagner, Mozart, and Bach, stressing music adapted to singers' limits and his varied use of voice ("the supreme instrument") for dramatic effect. Krenek denied modeling Orpheus on Wozzeck, but Berg likely influenced him. Hans Hartleb saw parallels in the operas' violence and music of "fatalism, melancholy, and sensuality" for Eurydike and Marie (whose role, he wrote, such music elevated).

==== Shostakovich ====
The second scene of Shostakovich's opera The Nose (1927) likely parodies Wozzeck. Shaken to find a nose he fears he severed, Shostakovich's barber galops through friendly townsfolk by a river, set to melodic motifs recalling Berg's tavern polka, during which Wozzeck feigns friendliness with townsfolk after murdering Marie. The barber tosses the nose into the water, as Wozzeck does his knife into a pond. Rising and falling lines evoke its sinking, as they depict Wozzeck's drowning. A policeman sees. He interrogates in hysterical falsetto, with a high climax, laughter, and final deflation, as the Captain does in Wozzeck's first scene. The barber replies in a clipped, spoken manner, echoing Wozzeck's monotonous assents.

==== Others ====
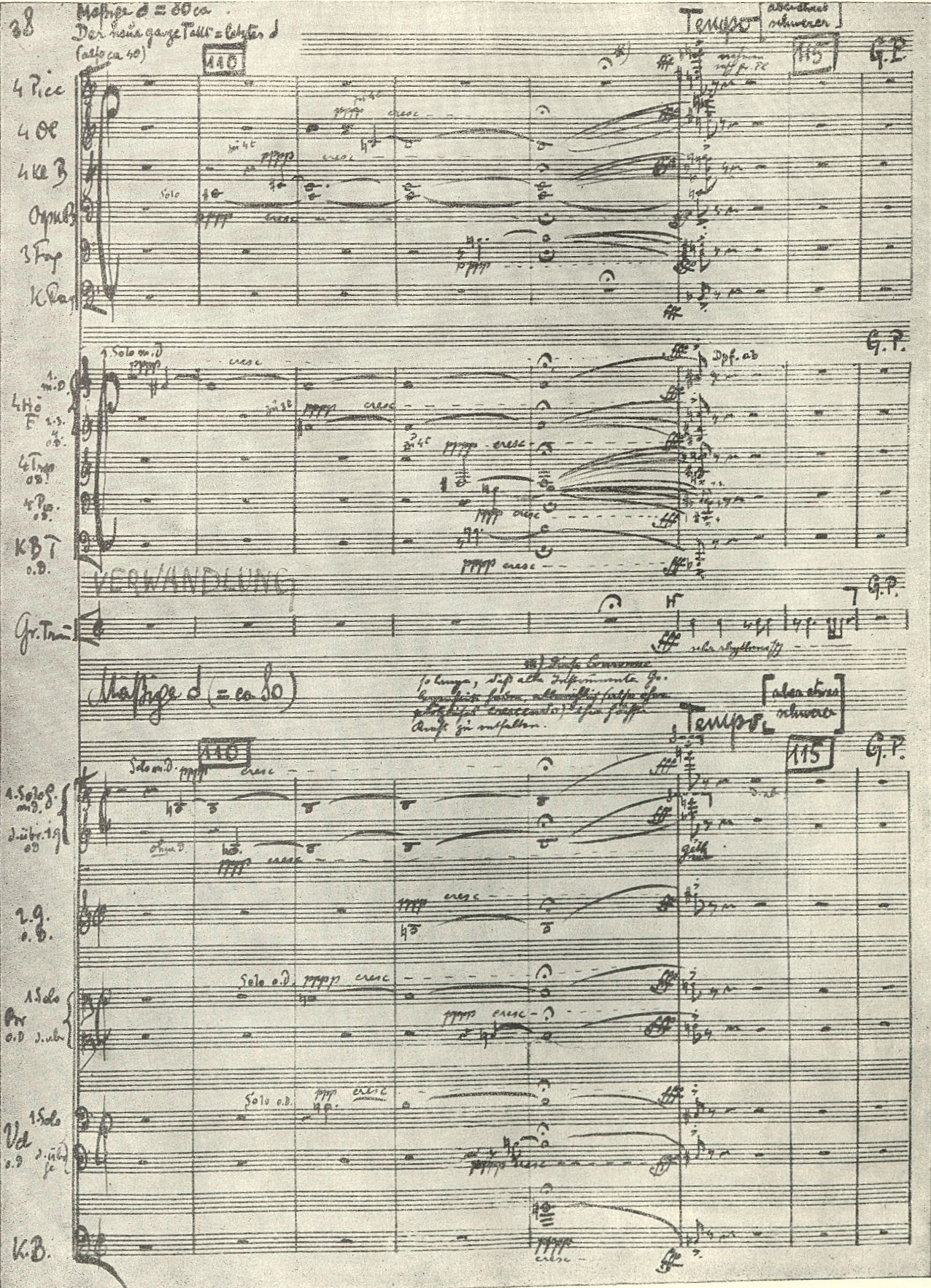
Half of twofold crescendo (manuscript, Berg)

Wozzeck was among Gershwin's influences and perhaps his model for Porgy and Bess, which he reportedly "wanted to write like ... an American Wozzeck". It also influenced Luigi Dallapiccola, who used the same tetrachord as Wozzeck's "wir arme Leut" motif in the climactic betrayal scene of the opera Il prigioniero (1944–1948). The one-act opera C'est la guerre (1960–1961) by Emil Petrovics shows Wozzeck's influence in its taut Expressionism and ironic use of popular tunes.

In later German opera, Wozzeck influenced the style of Bernd Alois Zimmermann's Die Soldaten, with its cinematic elements, and Wolfgang Rihm's Jakob Lenz.

In concert music, Luciano Berio quotes the rising orchestral chords Berg uses in the word painting of Wozzeck's drowning alongside other musical depictions of water in Sinfonia (1968–1969). Luigi Nono's concert fragments from his opera Al gran sole carico d'amore may follow the model of Berg's Wozzeck Fragments (and Lulu Symphony).

Composer and lyricist Stephen Sondheim, in creating the 1979 musical Sweeney Todd: The Demon Barber of Fleet Street, drew on Berg's portrayal of an antihero and tightly structured integration of music and drama.

== Other arrangements ==
Besides Stein's arrangement, John Rea's arrangement is for 22 singers and 21 instrumental parts.

== Recordings ==
Year	Wozzeck	Marie	Doctor	Captain	Andres	Margret	Drum Major	Orchestra / Chorus	Cond.	Label / Notes
1949	Heinrich Nillius	Suzanne Danco	Otakar Kraus	Parry Jones	Frank Vroons	Mary Jarred	Walter Widdop	BBC Chorus; BBC Symphony Orchestra	Adrian Boult	SOMM Ariadne (radio broadcast, Royal Albert Hall, issued 2023)
1951	Mack Harrell	Eileen Farrell	Ralph Herbert	Joseph Mordino (Soldat, Idiot)	David Lloyd	Edwina Eustis	Frederick Jagel	New York Philharmonic	Dimitri Mitropoulos	Columbia (FCX 157–158)
1955	Tito Gobbi	Dorothy Dow	Italo Tajo	Hugues Cuénod	Petre Munteanu	Maria Teresa Mandalari	Mirto Picchi	RAI Chorus & SO Rome	Nino Sanzogno	RAI / Myto (Italian)
1965	Dietrich Fischer-Dieskau	Evelyn Lear	Karl-Christian Kohn	Gerhard Stolze	Fritz Wunderlich	Alice Oelke	Helmut Melchert	Deutsche Oper Berlin Chorus & Orch.	Karl Böhm	Deutsche Grammophon; Grammy (1966)
1966	Walter Berry	Isabel Strauss	Karl Dönch	Albert Weikenmeier	Richard van Vrooman	Ingeborg Lasser	Fritz Uhl	Paris Opera Chorus & Orch.	Pierre Boulez	Columbia; Grammy (1968); bonus LP: Berg lecture read by Noël Goodwin
1970	Toni Blankenheim	Sena Jurinac	Hans Sotin	Gerhard Unger	Peter Haage	Elisabeth Steiner	Richard Cassilly	Hamburg State Opera Chorus; Hamburg State Orch.	Bruno Maderna	Arthaus (prod. Rolf Liebermann)
1979	Eberhard Waechter	Anja Silja	Alexander Malta	Heinz Zednik	Horst Laubenthal	Gertrude Jahn	Hermann Winkler	Vienna State Opera Chorus; Vienna Philharmonic	Christoph von Dohnányi	Decca
1987	Franz Grundheber	Hildegard Behrens	Aage Haugland	Heinz Zednik	Philip Langridge	Anna Gonda	Walter Raffeiner	Vienna State Opera Chorus; Vienna Philharmonic	Claudio Abbado	Deutsche Grammophon
1994	Franz Grundheber	Waltraud Meier	Günter von Kannen	Graham Clark	Endrik Wottrich	Dalia Schaechter	Mark Baker	Deutsche Oper Berlin Chorus & Children's Chorus; Staatskapelle Berlin	Daniel Barenboim	Teldec
2003	Andrew Shore	Josephine Barstow	Clive Bayley	Stuart Kale	Peter Bronder	Jean Rigby	Alan Woodrow	Philharmonia Orchestra	Paul Daniel	Chandos (Chan 3094; English)
2006	Franz Hawlata	Angela Denoke	Johann Tilli	Hubert Delamboye	Robert McPherson	Vivian Tierney	Reiner Goldberg	Vivaldi Chorus; IPSI; Petits Cantors de Catalunya; Gran Teatre del Liceu Orch. & Chorus	Sebastian Weigle	Opus Arte (prod. Calixto Bieito)
2017	Roman Trekel	Anne Schwanewilms	Nathan Berg	Marc Molomot	Robert McPherson	Katherine Ciesinski	Gordon Gietz	Houston Grand Opera Children's Chorus; Shepherd School of Music; Houston Symphony	Hans Graf	Naxos

== Film adaptation ==
The Hamburg State Opera's 1970 production was filmed at a deserted castle for director Joachim Hess's 1972 TV film Wozzeck, broadcast on Norddeutscher Rundfunk.

== See also ==
- Hans Heinsheimer – German-American music publisher and author (1900–1993)
- Hungarian-Austrian writer Andreas Latzko's 1917 novella Heimkehr (Homecoming)—from Menschen im Krieg (People in War)—depicts a humiliated veteran, unable to marry and driven to murder.
- Schoenberg hexachord
- Structural vulnerability is the risk of harm arising from unequal social, economic, and political structures.
