= List of songs recorded by Gary Barlow =

Songs recorded by Gary Barlow

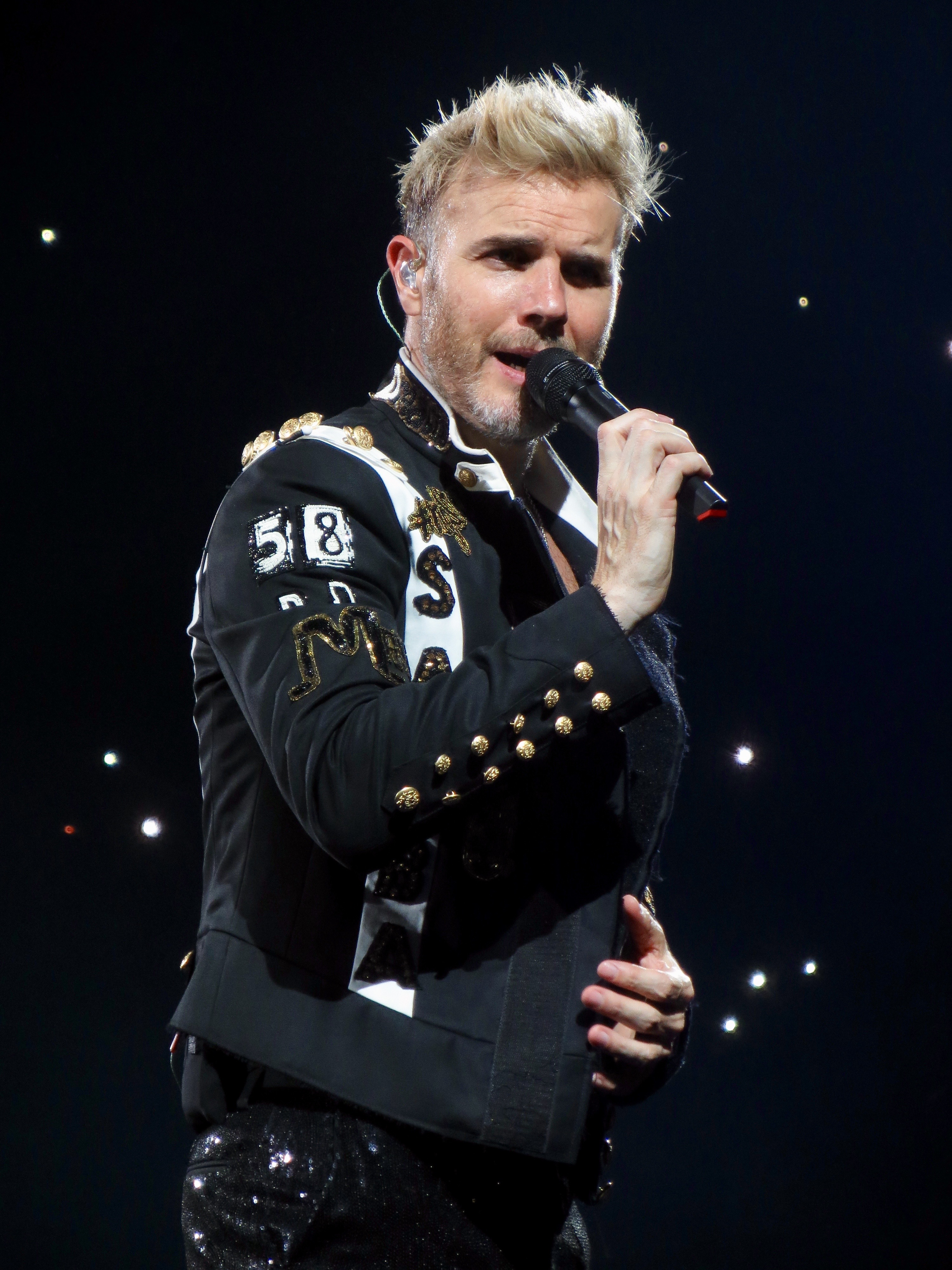
Barlow performing in 2017

The English singer and songwriter Gary Barlow has recorded songs for three solo studio albums, a joint album and has also collaborated with other artists on their respective singles. In 1996, Take That, a boy band consisted of five members, including Barlow, disbanded after 6 years recording music together. Three months after the release of their then-final single, the singer launched his solo debut song, "Forever Love"; it was written solely by Barlow and featured more mature sound than the work previously released by Take That. The single has been succeeded by Barlow's 1997 debut studio album, Open Road, a primary pop and blue-eyed soul oriented record. It was mainly written and composed by Barlow himself; however, he listed some songwriters in the penning process. American entertainer Madonna and producer Shep Pettibone wrote "Love Won't Wait" for the album, although it was originally planned for a Madonna project, which she later abandoned. Barlow worked with American songwriter Dianne Warren with whom he co-wrote the song "My Commitment" for the album. Howard Perdew and Andy Spooner wrote "So Help Me Girl", a single for which Barlow recorded a Spanish-language version titled "Ayúdame" (English: Help Me).

In 1998 the singer released Open Road in America with a slightly altered track listing. For that version of the record, he collaborated with Swedish producers Max Martin and Kristian Lundin and co-wrote the track "Superhero".

== Songs ==
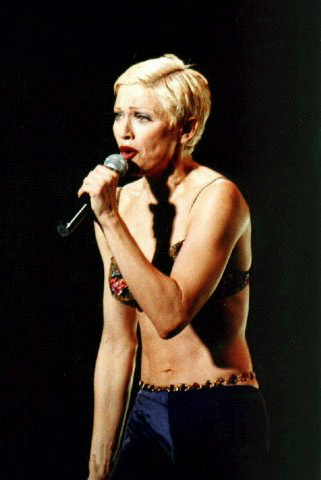
American singer Madonna co-wrote "Love Won't Wait" for a planned studio album project which she later abandoned. Barlow recorded it in 1997

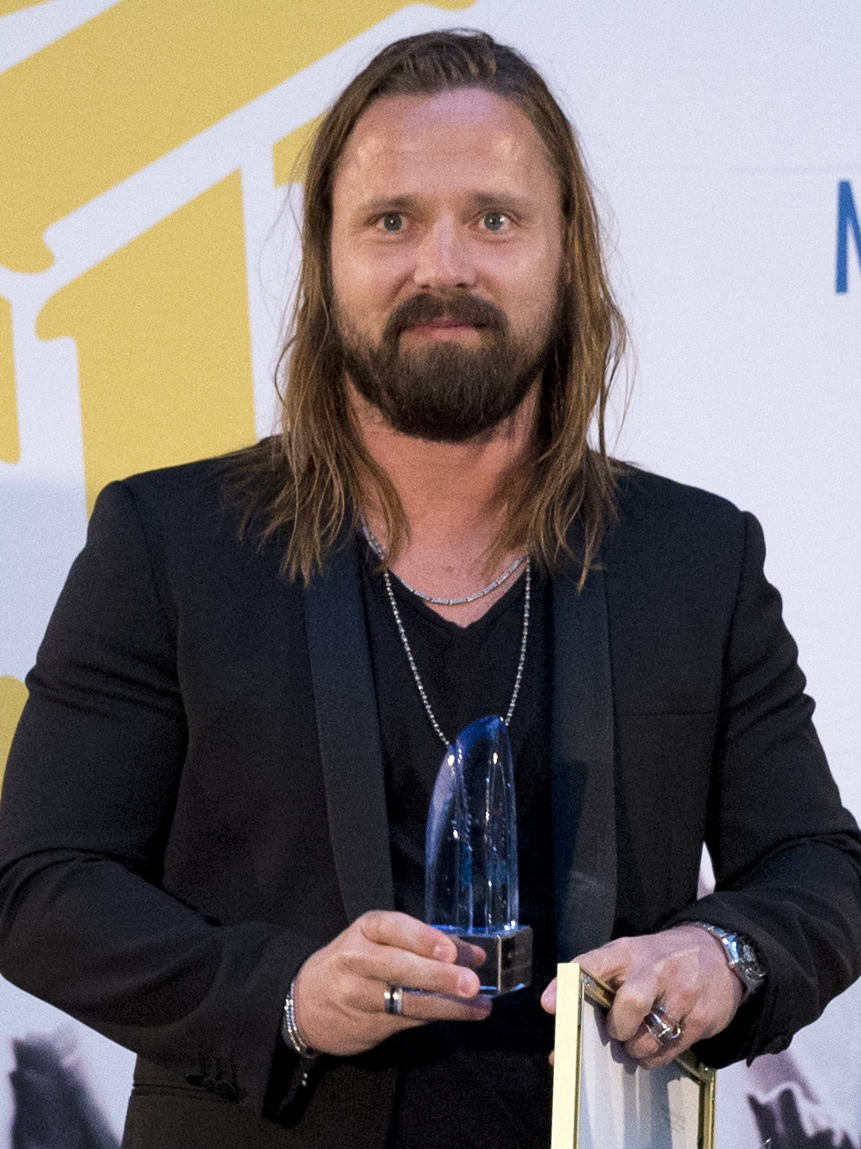
Barlow collaborated with Swedish producer and songwriter Max Martin on "Superhero"/"For All That You Want"

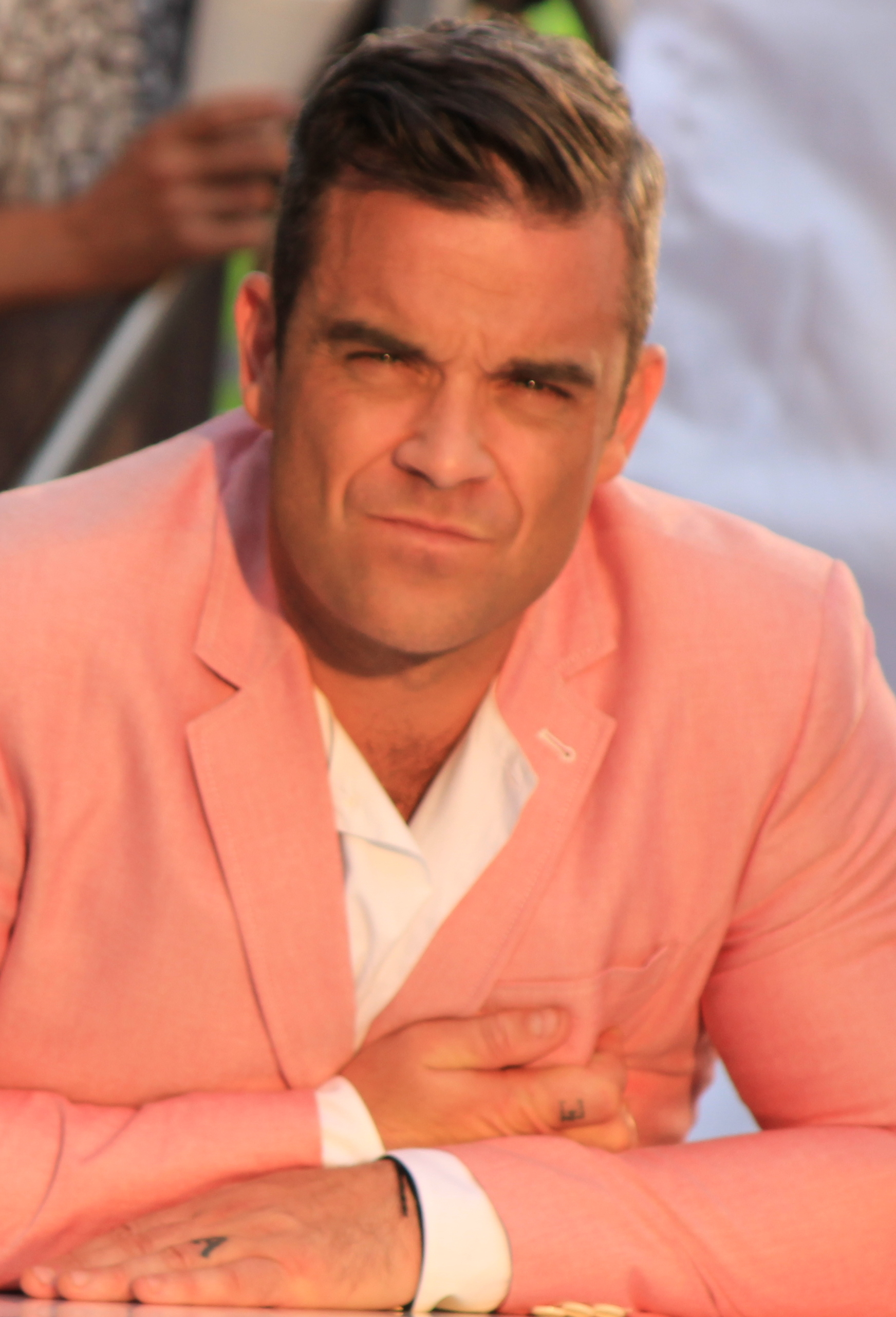
Barlow and bandmate Robbie Williams wrote and sang "Shame" in 2010. They also co-wrote "Requiem" which Barlow recorded it for his 2013 album, Since I Saw You Last

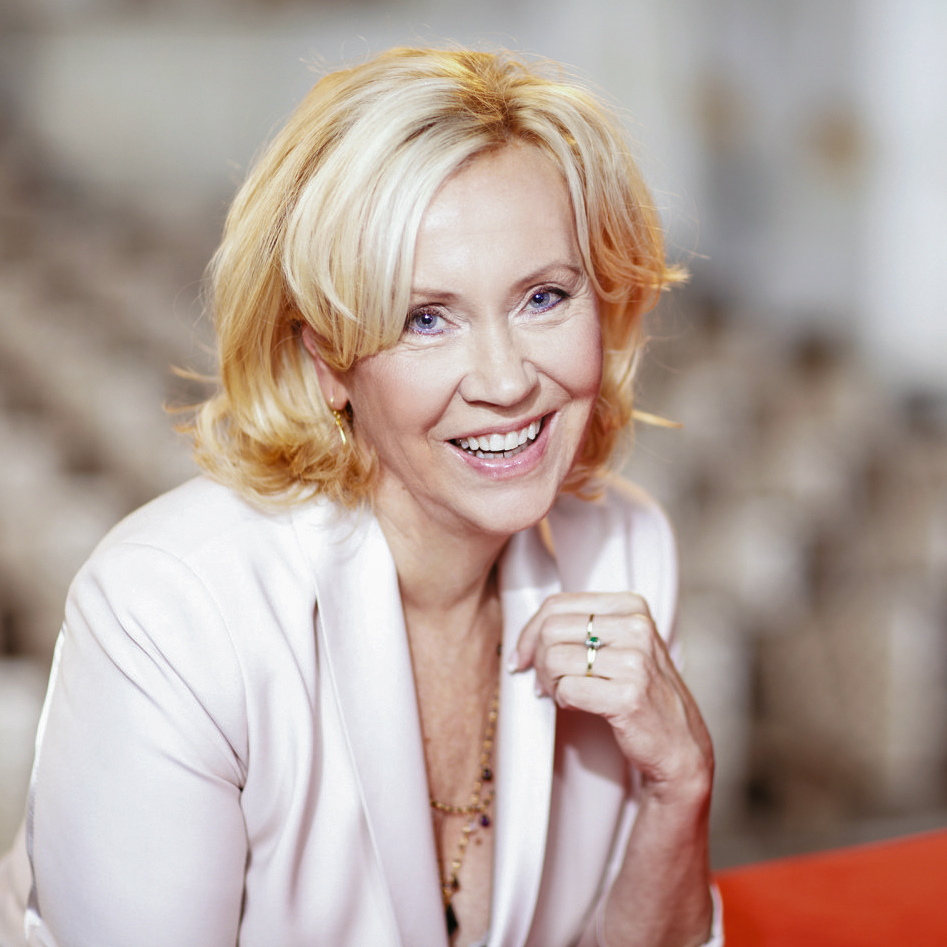
Barlow and Swedish singer Agnetha Fältskog sang "I Should've Followed You Home" in 2013

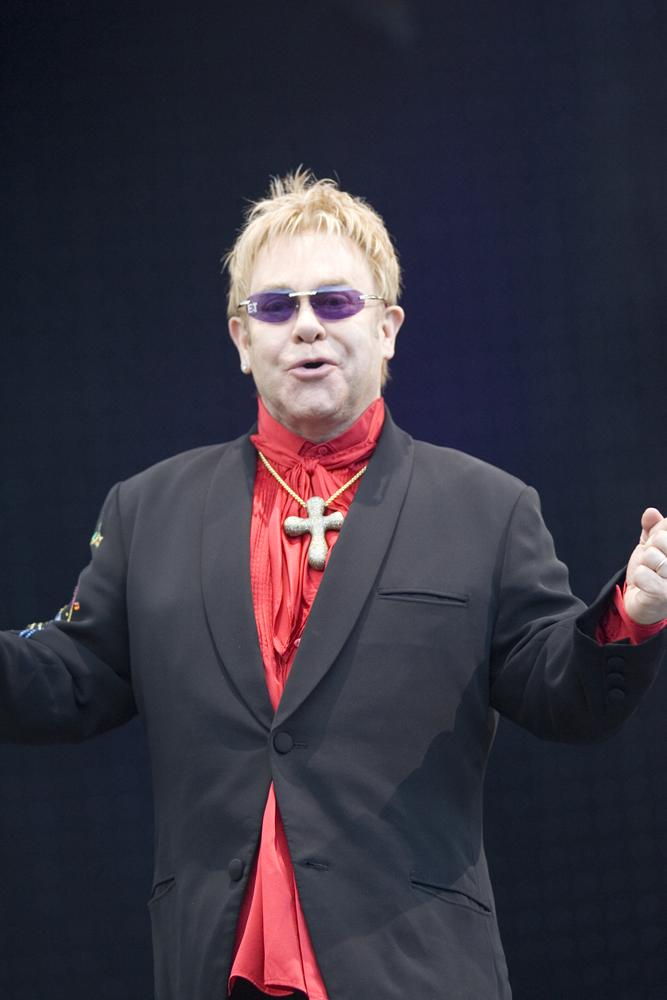
Barlow collaborated with English singer Elton John and sang the duet "Face to Face" in 2013

Released songs recorded by Gary Barlow
Song	Other performer(s)	Writer(s)	Originating album	Year	Ref.
"6th Avenue"	—	Gary Barlow; John Shanks	Since I Saw You Last	2013	
"Actress"	—	Gary Barlow; James Maddock	Since I Saw You Last	2013	
"All That I've Given Away"	—	Gary Barlow	Twelve Months, Eleven Days	1999	
"Always"	—	Gary Barlow	Open Road	1997	
"Amazing Grace"	The Commonwealth Band; Hayley Westenra	John Newton	Sing	2012	
"Are You Ready Now"	—	Gary Barlow	Open Road	1997	
"Arms Around Me"	—	Gary Barlow; Peter Vettese	Twelve Months, Eleven Days	1999	
"Ayúdame"	—	Howard Perdew; Andy Spooner	Open Road	1997	
"Before You Turn Away"	—	Gary Barlow	Twelve Months, Eleven Days	1999	
"Cuddly Toy"	—	Andrew Roachford	Open Road	1997	
"Don't Need a Reason"	—	Gary Barlow	Twelve Months, Eleven Days	1999	
"Dying Inside"	—	Gary Barlow	Since I Saw You Last	2013	
"Everybody Hurts"	Helping Haiti	Bill Berry; Peter Buck; Mike Mills; Michael Stipe	—	2010	
"Everything I Wanted"	—	Gary Barlow	Open Road	1997	
"Face to Face"	Elton John	Gary Barlow; John Shanks	Since I Saw You Last	2013	
"Fast Car"	—	Gary Barlow	Twelve Months, Eleven Days	1999	
"For All That You Want"	—	Gary Barlow; Max Martin; Kristian Lundin	Twelve Months, Eleven Days	1999	
"Forever Love"	—	Gary Barlow	Open Road	1997	
"God"	—	Gary Barlow	Since I Saw You Last	2013	
"God Save the Queen (National Anthem)"	The Commonwealth Band; Laura Wright	Thomas Arne	Sing	2012	
"Hang On in There Baby"	—	Johnny Bristol	Open Road	1997	
"Here Comes the Sun"	The Commonwealth Band	George Harrison	Sing	2012	
"I Fall So Deep"	—	Larry Loftin; Mattias Gustafsson; Amy Powers	Open Road	1997	
"I Should've Followed You Home"	Agnetha Fältskog	Gary Barlow; Jörgen Elofsson	A	2013	
"Jump"	—	Gary Barlow; Tim Rice-Oxley	Since I Saw You Last	2013	
"Land of Hope and Glory"	The Commonwealth Band; Alfie Boe; Military Wives	Edward Elgar; A.C. Benson	Sing	2012	
"Lay Down for Love"	—	Gary Barlow; Richard Stannard; Matt Rowbottom	Open Road	1997	
"Let Me Go"	—	Gary Barlow	Since I Saw You Last	2013	
"Lie to Me"	—	Gary Barlow	Twelve Months, Eleven Days	1999	
"Love Won't Wait"	—	Madonna; Shep Pettibone	Open Road	1997	
"The Meaning of a Love Song"	—	Gary Barlow	Open Road	1997	
"More Than Life"	—	Gary Barlow	Since I Saw You Last	2013	
"Mr. Everything"	—	Gary Barlow	Since I Saw You Last	2013	
"My Commitment"	—	Gary Barlow; Dianne Warren	Open Road	1997	
"Never Knew"	—	Gary Barlow	Open Road	1997	
"Nothing Feels the Same"	—	Gary Barlow	Twelve Months, Eleven Days	1999	
"Open Road"	—	Gary Barlow	Open Road	1997	
"Requiem"	—	Gary Barlow; Robbie Williams	Since I Saw You Last	2013	
"Shame"	Robbie Williams	Gary Barlow; Robbie Williams	In and Out of Consciousness: Greatest Hits 1990–2010	2010	
"Since I Saw You Last"	—	Gary Barlow	Since I Saw You Last	2013	
"Sing"	The Commonwealth Band; Military Wives	Gary Barlow; Andrew Lloyd Webber	Sing	2012	
"Sing"	The Commonwealth Band	Gary Barlow; Andrew Lloyd Webber	Sing	2012	
"Small Town Girls"	—	Gary Barlow	Since I Saw You Last	2013	
"So Help Me Girl"	—	Howard Perdew; Andy Spooner	Open Road	1997	
"The Song I'll Never Write"	—	Gary Barlow; Andrew Frampton; Steve Kipner	Since I Saw You Last	2013	
"Stronger"	—	Gary Barlow; Graham Gouldman	Twelve Months, Eleven Days	1999	
"Stronger as One"	The Commonwealth Band; Laura Wright	Robert Hartshorne	Sing	2012	
"Superhero"	—	Gary Barlow; Max Martin; Joylon Skinner; Kristian Lundin	Open Road	1998	
"This House"	—	Gary Barlow; John Shanks	Since I Saw You Last	2013	
"Walk"	—	Gary Barlow	Twelve Months, Eleven Days	1999	
"We Like to Love"	—	Gary Barlow	Since I Saw You Last	2013	
"Wondering"	—	Gary Barlow	Twelve Months, Eleven Days	1999	
"Yesterday's Girl"	—	Gary Barlow	Twelve Months, Eleven Days	1999	

== See also ==
- List of songs written by Gary Barlow
- Gary Barlow discography
- Take That discography
