= Gary Barlow discography =

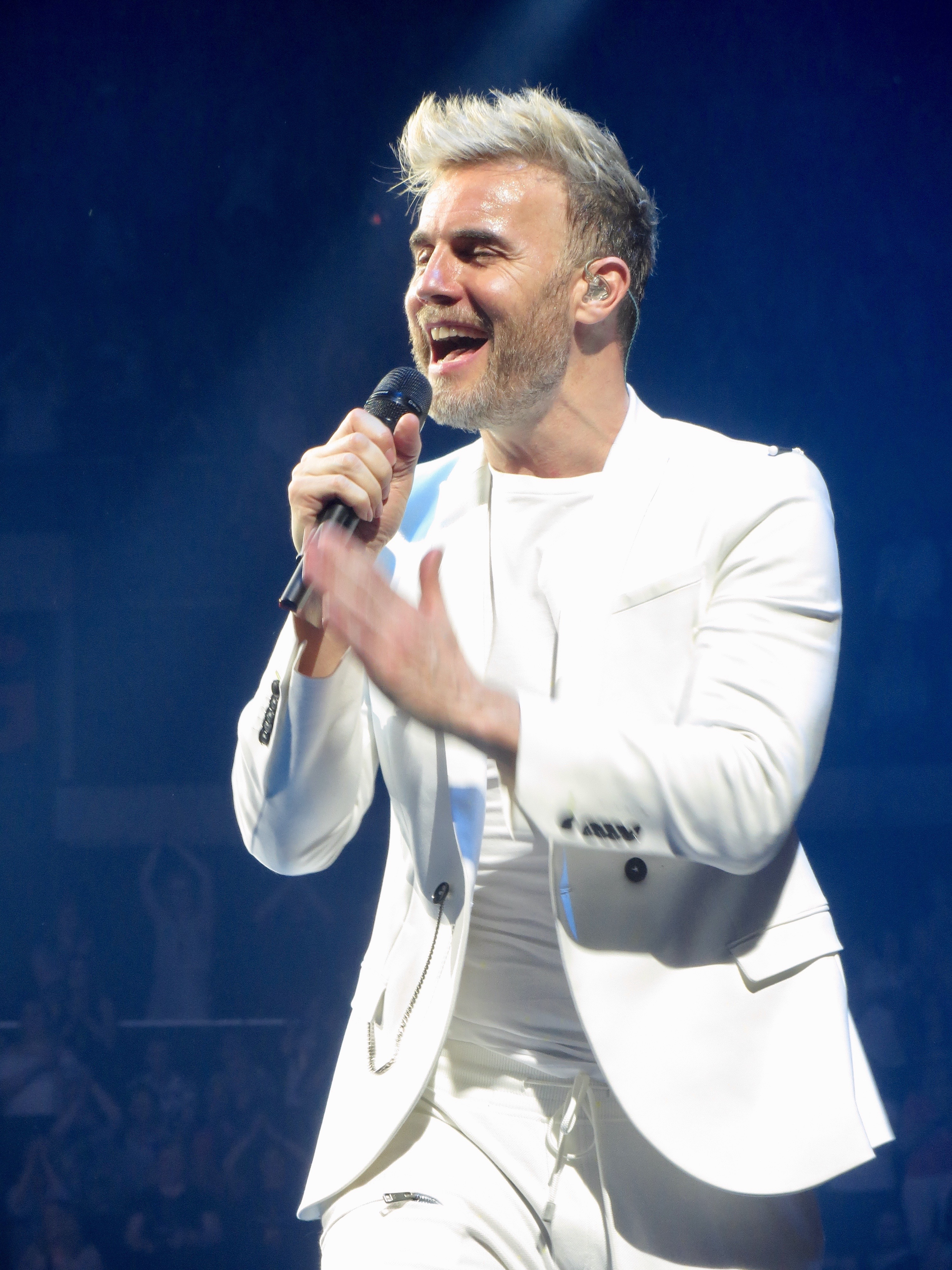
- Gary Barlow performing at the SSE Hydro in Glasgow in 2017
- Studio albums: 6
- Extended plays: 1
- Compilation albums: 1
- Singles: 19
- Video albums: 3
- Music videos: 22
- Featured songs: 5

English singer Gary Barlow has released six studio albums, nineteen singles, twenty-two music videos and five featured songs. Barlow has had fifteen number-one UK singles (twelve with Take That and three solo), eleven number-one albums (eight with Take That and three solo) and has written thirteen UK number-one singles (10 with Take That, two solo and one as co-writer of Robbie Williams' "Candy"), selling over 50 million records worldwide and over seven million concert tickets.

After Take That split up in 1996 Gary Barlow signed with RCA Records and began to write his first solo material since the band had formed. Prior to Take That forming Barlow had been writing and performing songs across the North of England until he was spotted by Nigel Martin-Smith. He identified Barlow as the foundation to which he could build a new boyband around, using Barlow's voice and songwriting ability to catapult Take That to fame and superstardom. As Barlow began to become recognised throughout the music industry as the songwriting talent behind Take That a number of musicians took notice, with Elton John asking Barlow to provide backing vocals to his hit single "Can You Feel the Love Tonight".

In July 1996, Barlow released his first single as a solo artist, entitled "Forever Love". The single proved a critical and commercial success becoming Barlow's first solo number 1 in the UK, selling over 400,000 copies and being certified as Gold by the BPI. The single remained in the top 75 of the UK charts for 16 weeks whilst also charting in the top 10 of twelve countries across Europe. The second single was announced as "Love Won't Wait", written by Madonna and Shep Pettibone. The single was released in April 1997 and became Barlow's second number 1 hit in the UK, becoming certified as Silver by the BPI and also charting in eleven countries worldwide. Barlow's debut album Open Road was released in May 1997. It went straight to number 1 in the UK and charted across Europe. The album was later certified as Platinum by the BPI and has sold 2 million copies worldwide to date. The third single from the album was "So Help Me Girl", which was released in Europe in July and was Barlow's first release in the US. The single peaked at number 3 on the Billboard Contemporary, number 1 on the Billboard R&R and peaked at number 44 on the Billboard Hot 100. The single also peaked at number 11 in the UK and charted respectfully inside Europe. The final UK single from the album was "Open Road", which charted at number 7 in the UK, whilst the final single to be released in Germany, "Hang on in There Baby" peaked at 69.

After the success of his debut album, Barlow released his second album Twelve Months, Eleven Days in 1999. The album was preceded by the single "Stronger", however due to an unexpected media backlash towards Barlow and the taunting of him by bandmate Robbie Williams the single received minimal airplay and support and peaked at number 16 in the UK and number 11 in Finland. The second single "For All That You Want" was originally entitled Superhero" and charted in the US, but was rewritten for Barlow's second album. The single was also subjected to minimal airplay and support and charted at number 24 in the UK, and number 6 in Finland. The album followed and peaked at number 34 in the UK, which resulted in Barlow and his label parting ways as he instead began to work behind the scenes of the music industry and write for artists rather than perform himself.

Barlow's first solo release since 1999 was a duet with reconciled Take That bandmate Robbie Williams on a single entitled "Shame". The single was written by both Barlow and Williams after they began working together in Los Angeles on new material for Take That following Williams' return to the band. The single peaked at number 2 in the UK, being certified as Silver by the BPI and Gold by the FIMI, whilst also charting in 19 countries worldwide.

In June 2012, thirteen years after the release of his last solo album Twelve Months, Eleven Days, Gary Barlow released his third solo album Sing, which entered at number 1 in the UK with the single "Sing" also entering the charts at number 11. The following week Sing rose to number 1 in the UK Singles Chart selling 142,000 copies and becoming the highest selling single of 2012. The album of the same name remained at number 1 making Barlow the first artist in 2012 to have the number 1 album and number 1 single in the same week.

== Albums ==
=== Studio albums ===
Title	Details	Peak chart positions										Sales	Certifications
Title	Details	UK	AUS	AUT	BEL	GER	IRE	NLD	SCO	SPA	SWI	Sales	Certifications
Open Road	Released: 26 May 1997; Label: BMG, RCA, Arista; Formats: CD, digital download	1	30	13	7	10	1	13	2	5	6	UK: 297,424	BPI: Platinum
Twelve Months, Eleven Days	Released: 11 October 1999; Label: BMG, RCA; Formats: CD, digital download	35	—	—	—	67	19	—	81	—	—	UK: 33,120	
Sing	Released: 28 May 2012; Label: Decca; Formats: CD, digital download	1	87	—	—	—	61	—	1	—	—		BPI: Gold
Since I Saw You Last	Released: 25 November 2013; Label: Polydor; Formats: CD, digital download	2	—	27	179	10	2	—	1	—	91	UK: 723,202	BPI: 2× Platinum; IRMA: Gold
Music Played by Humans	Released: 27 November 2020; Label: Polydor; Formats: LP, cassette, CD, digital download	1	—	—	—	64	10	—	1	—	88		BPI: Gold
The Dream of Christmas	Released: 26 November 2021; Label: Polydor; Formats: CD, digital download	5	—	—	—	90	34	—	5	—	99		

=== Compilation albums ===
Title	Details	Peak chart positions	
Title	Details	UK	SCO
Open Road: 21st Anniversary Edition	Released: 13 April 2018; Label: Sony Music; Formats: CD, LP, digital download	25	8

== Extended plays ==
Title	Details
Meanwhile	Released: 29 August 2025; Formats: Digital download

== Singles ==
=== As lead artist ===
Title	Year	Peak chart positions										Certifications	Album
Title	Year	UK	AUS	AUT	FIN	GER	IRE	NLD	SWE	SWI	US	Certifications	Album
"Forever Love"	1996	1	7	11	6	5	3	6	12	5	—	BPI: Gold	Open Road
"Love Won't Wait"	1997	1	16	20	16	35	5	32	53	23	—	BPI: Silver	Open Road
"So Help Me Girl"	1997	11	36	—	—	78	14	58	—	—	44		Open Road
"Open Road"	1997	7	—	—	—	63	29	—	—	—	—		Open Road
"Are You Ready Now"	1997	—	—	—	—	—	—	—	—	—	—		Open Road
"Superhero"	1998	—	—	—	—	—	—	—	—	—	— (Note: "Superhero" did not chart on the Billboard Hot 100, but peaked at number 6 on the Bubbling Under Hot 100 chart, which acts as an extension to the Hot 100.)		Open Road
"Hang on in There Baby"	1998	—	—	—	—	69	—	—	—	—	—		Open Road
"Stronger"	1999	16	—	—	11	73	—	—	—	—	—		Twelve Months, Eleven Days
"For All That You Want"	1999	24	—	—	6	94	—	—	—	—	—		Twelve Months, Eleven Days
"Lie to Me"	1999	—	—	—	—	—	—	—	—	—	—		Twelve Months, Eleven Days
"Shame" (with Robbie Williams)	2010	2	62	20	—	11	8	4	24	19	—	BPI: Silver	In and Out of Consciousness
"Sing" (with the Commonwealth Band)	2012	1	—	—	—	—	12	69	—	—	—	BPI: Gold	Sing
"Let Me Go"	2013	2	—	32	—	25	8	—	—	—	—	BPI: Platinum	Since I Saw You Last
"Face to Face" (with Elton John)	2014	69	—	—	—	—	75	—	—	—	—		Since I Saw You Last
"Since I Saw You Last"	2014	65	—	—	—	—	—	—	—	—	—		Since I Saw You Last
"Elita" (with Michael Bublé and Sebastián Yatra)	2020	— (Note: "Elita" did not enter the UK Singles Chart, but peaked at number 14 on the UK Download Chart.)	—	—	—	—	—	—	—	—	—		Music Played by Humans
"Incredible"	2020	— (Note: "Incredible" did not enter the UK Singles Chart, but peaked at number 19 on the UK Download Chart.)	—	—	—	—	—	—	—	—	—		Music Played by Humans
"This Is My Time"	2020	—	—	—	—	—	—	—	—	—	—		Music Played by Humans
"Enough Is Enough" (with Beverley Knight)	2021	—	—	—	—	—	—	—	—	—	—		Music Played by Humans
"How Christmas Is Supposed to Be" (with Sheridan Smith)	2021	— (Note: "How Christmas Is Supposed to Be" did not enter the UK Singles Chart, but peaked at number 68 on the UK Download Chart.)	—	—	—	—	—	—	—	—	—		The Dream of Christmas
"If There's Not a Song About It" (with Colbie Caillat)	2025	— (Note: "If There's Not a Song About It" did not enter the UK Singles Chart, but peaked at number 84 on the UK Download Chart.)	—	—	—	—	—	—	—	—	—		Meanwhile
"Don't Look Down" (with Becky Hill)	2025	— (Note: "Don't Look Down" did not enter the UK Singles Chart, but peaked at number 66 on the UK Download Chart.)	—	—	—	—	—	—	—	—	—		Meanwhile
"Out Here Looking" (with Rosa Linn)	2025	—	—	—	—	—	—	—	—	—			Meanwhile

=== As featured artist ===
Title	Year	Peak chart positions										Certifications	Album
Title	Year	UK	AUS	AUT	FRA	GER	IRE	NZ	SWE	SWI	US	Certifications	Album
"Can You Feel the Love Tonight" (backing vocals to Elton John)	1994	14	9	4	1	14	9	7	2	10	4	GLF: Gold; IFPI AUT: Gold; RIAA: Gold; SNEP: Gold	The Lion King
"Everybody Hurts" (with Helping Haiti)	2010	1	28	23	—	16	1	17	21	16	— (Note: "Everybody Hurts" did not chart on the Billboard Hot 100, but peaked at number 21 on the Bubbling Under Hot 100 Singles chart, which acts as an extension to the Hot 100.)	BPI: Platinum	Non-album singles
"Teardrop" (with The Collective)	2011	24	—	—	—	—	17	—	—	—	—		Non-album singles
"I Should've Followed You Home" (with Agnetha Fältskog)	2013	99	—	—	—	—	—	—	—	—	—		A
"Get Ready" (with Smokey Robinson)	2014	—	—	—	—	—	—	—	—	—	—		Smokey & Friends
"Don't Dream It's Over" (Alex Christensen and the Berlin Orchestra featuring Gary Barlow)	2022	—	—	—	—	—	—	—	—	—	—		Classical 80s Dance
"—" denotes a single that did not chart or was not released.

== Other charted songs ==
Title	Year	Peak chart positions	Album
Title	Year	UK	Album
"Here Comes the Sun"	2012	59	Sing

== Videography ==
=== Albums ===
Title	Details	Peak chart positions	
Title	Details	UK	IRE
Open Book (Note: A set of recorded interviews and performances with Gary Barlow in 1997 and 1998 showing him express his feelings on the Take That split and how he is adjusting to his solo career.) (Note: Packaged with promo of "Hang on in There Baby".)	Released: 16 March 1998; Studio: RCA; Format: VHS	—	—
Gary Barlow: Live (Note: Gary Barlow captured live in performance in his home town of Manchester in December 2012. The concert formed part of Barlow's record breaking first UK solo tour in over 12 years and features solo material, Take That classics and appearances from special guests.)	Released: 4 March 2013; Studio: Polydor; Format: DVD	1	7
Since You Saw Him Last (Note: Gary Barlow's sold out arena performance at the O2 in London as part of his Since I Saw You Last tour, his biggest solo tour yet.)	Released: 15 December 2014; Studio: Polydor; Format: DVD	1	4

=== Television ===
Title	Details
Gary Barlow: On Her Majesty's Service (Note: A documentary featuring the process of Gary Barlow writing the Queen's Diamond Jubilee official single and travelling across The Commonwealth enlisting the help of singers and musicians to feature in the track.)	Released: 3 June 2012; Studio: Decca; Format: Digital download, broadcast

=== Film ===
Title	Details
Keith Lemon: The Film (Note: Appears as himself in a cameo role.)	Released: 24 August 2012
Greatest Days (Note: Appears as himself in a cameo role.)	Released: 16 June 2023

=== Music videos ===
Title	Year	Director
"Forever Love"	1996	Sophie Muller
"Love Won't Wait"	1997	Rocky Schenck
"So Help Me Girl"	1997	Rocky Schenck
"So Help Me Girl" (US version)	1997	Alan Smithee
"Open Road"	1997	Thom Oliphant
"Superhero"	1998	Alan Smithee
"Hang on in There Baby"	1998	Tony Campbell
"Stronger"	1999	Dani Jacobs
"For All That You Want"	1999	Dani Jacobs
"Everybody Hurts"	2010	Joseph Kahn
"Shame"	2010	Vaughan Arnell
"Teardrop"	2011	Labrinth
"Sing"	2012	Ben Winston
"Forever Autumn"	2013	Jeff Wayne
"Let Me Go"	2013	Ben Winston
"Face to Face"	2014	Ben Winston
"Since I Saw You Last"	2014	Ben Winston
"Forever Love" (Live)	2018	
"Open Road" (Live)	2018	
"Elita"	2020	Vaughan Arnell
"Incredible"	2020	Michael Baldwin
"This Is My Time"	2020	
"How Christmas Is Supposed To Be"	2021	
