= The Open Road Tour =

1998–99 concert tour by Gary Barlow

- Tour by Gary Barlow
- Cover of the official tourbook
- Location: Europe
- Associated album: Open Road
- Start date: March 1998
- End date: February 1999
- No. of shows: 26

Gary Barlow concert chronology
- The Open Road Tour (1998–99); For the Fans Tour (1999)

The Open Road Tour was the first concert tour by English singer-songwriter Gary Barlow as a solo artist. The tour spanned Europe to promote his debut solo album Open Road.

== Setlist ==
1. "Labour of Love"
2. "Love Won't Wait"
3. "So Help Me Girl"
4. "Open Road"
5. "Everything I Ever Wanted"
6. "My Commitment"
7. "Are You Ready Now"
8. "Luv Luv Luv"
9. Take That Medley
10. "Pray"
11. "Why Can't I Wake Up with You"
12. "A Million Love Songs"
13. "Never Forget"
14. "Hang On in There Baby"
15. "Cuddly Toy"
16. "Your Song"
17. "Back for Good"
18. "Forever Love" – dedicated to Princess Diana, Gianni Versace and Barlow's grandmother

== Tour dates ==
The Open Road Tour took place in February and March 1998, and was Barlow's first solo tour in Europe. The first show at Symphony Hall sold out within two hours.

Ticket sales at a subsequent show at the National Exhibition Centre were poor, with only half of the tickets sold after being on sale for 17 months. The show was originally scheduled for November 1998, but was postponed twice and finally went ahead in December 1999. Barlow's record company, RCA Records, claimed that the cancellations were to allow Barlow to work on his album.

== Reception ==
The tour was received well by Lynne Robertson of The Herald, who described it as "one of the best all-round live shows of 1998" and noted that Barlow "appeared entirely at home as the man in the spotlight, demonstrating a humble and wholly likable stage persona during the 90-minute show which clearly illustrated his immense musical talents, encompassing soul, pop and rock roots with a tinkling of jazz thrown in for good measure."

Writing for The Scotsman, Gareth McLean likened the show to "being at a really bad wedding." McLean, however, noted that Barlow's "charmlessness and bland tunes" did not seem to bother the crowd.
