= Superhero (Gary Barlow song) =

Single by Gary Barlow

from the album Open Road and Open Road: 21st Anniversary Edition
- B-side: "Lay Down For Love"
- Released: February 17, 1998 (original release); April 1, 2018 (Open Road: 21st Anniversary release)
- Recorded: SARM Studios, Cheiron Studios
- Genre: Pop
- Length: 3:41
- Label: Arista
- Songwriters: Gary Barlow; Max Martin; Kristian Lundin; Jolyon Skinner
- Producers: Max Martin; Kristian Lundin

Gary Barlow singles chronology
"Open Road" (1997)	"Superhero" (1998)	"Hang On in There Baby" (1998)

"Superhero" is the second American single released from the American version of British singer-songwriter Gary Barlow's debut solo album, Open Road. It was released on February 17, 1998, six weeks after the release of the album in America. The track also appears as a single on Barlow's 2018 compilation album, Open Road: 21st Anniversary Edition.

== Background ==
Whilst reworking Open Road for the American market, Barlow met with songwriters Kristian Lundin, Max Martin and Jolyon Skinner, and whilst recording alternate vocals for So Help Me Girl, wrote an entirely brand-new track, Superhero, exclusively for the American market. Barlow described the song as "Something designed to be suited to the kind of pop music in the American charts now, such as that of *NSYNC or the Backstreet Boys." The song was not as successful as his first American single, only peaking at number 23 on the Billboard Adult Contemporary chart, and not even charting on the Billboard Hot 100.

== Reworking ==
During recording sessions for his second British album, Twelve Months, Eleven Days, Barlow decided that he would re-work the song and release in the United Kingdom. He made three minor changes, which included changing two lines in the chorus, enhancing the beat from 68bpm to 72bpm, and renaming the song "For All That You Want". It was subsequently included as the first track on Twelve Months, Eleven Days, and was released as the second British single from the album, becoming the last single Barlow released in the United Kingdom until the Robbie Williams-duet "Shame" in 2010.

== Track listing ==
1. "Superhero" – 3:41
2. "Lay Down For Love" – 5:35

== Charts ==
Chart (1998)	Peak position
US Bubbling Under Hot 100 Singles (Billboard)	6
US Adult Contemporary (Billboard)	23
US Adult Contemporary (Radio & Records)	16
