= Since I Saw You Last =

Studio album by Gary Barlow
- Released: 22 November 2013
- Genre: Pop; folk pop; alternative rock
- Length: 58:39
- Label: Polydor
- Producer: Steve Power

Gary Barlow chronology
Sing (2012)	Since I Saw You Last (2013)	Music Played by Humans (2020)

Singles from Since I Saw You Last
- 1. "Let Me Go" Released: 15 November 2013; 2. "Face to Face" Released: 20 January 2014; 3. "Since I Saw You Last" Released: 14 April 2014

Since I Saw You Last is the fourth solo studio album released by British singer-songwriter Gary Barlow. The album was released by Polydor Records on 22 November 2013 in Ireland, and on 25 November in the United Kingdom. It debuted at number two on the UK Albums Chart, and met with a mixed critical reaction.

It is Barlow's first full-length solo album in fourteen years, following 1999's Twelve Months, Eleven Days. It features a range of genres, described by Barlow as a mixture of pop, folk pop and alternative. The album's lead single, "Let Me Go", was released a week before the album, and became Barlow's 21st UK top-three single.

== Background ==
With Take That on hiatus and following the success of a series of solo concerts over the previous two years, Barlow announced plans to release his first solo studio album in fourteen years. The album was released on 25 November 2013, to be followed by a live tour in 2014. The album was confirmed to feature a duet with Elton John on the track "Face to Face" on 24 September 2013. Regarding "Let Me Go", Barlow said, "I've always liked folky, acoustic music, but I've never fully explored it. I turned back time and was listening to Johnny Cash and early Elton John before I wrote 'Let Me Go'. I'm 42; I don't want to do urban or dance music. I love Mumford & Sons—it's good, English music, but let's be honest, they got it off Johnny Cash too."

Barlow cites that after the release of Twelve Months, Eleven Days, he stopped singing as he walked away from the limelight. He said, "I never even sang in my own studio; I was telling myself [that] I don't need to be an artist anymore; I started as a songwriter." However, after the success of the Take That reunion, he felt that he had to face his demons and right the wrongs he felt took hold of his last full studio album. He said, "The one thing I was dreading was that the last album would be on my shoulder the whole time I made this one, but it wasn't—it was flushed out really quickly. I'm not haunted by that time. My experience 14 years ago was completely different from now." Barlow further elaborated, "The last album I made was so laden with people telling me who I should sound like that I listen back now and think 'Who's that?', but Since I Saw You Last was easy to make; there's a lot of my life on this record."

Several of the album's songs were co-written in 2011, for a planned duo album with Robbie Williams titled Cain & Abel, a nod to Barlow's autobiography, where he refers to himself and Williams as the Cain and Abel of Take That. Williams called the Cain & Abel album "middle-of-the-road"–believing its sound was too mature to garner mass appeal with his desired youthful, mainstream audience, and decided to cancel the Cain & Abel project. Williams poached "Candy" and "Different" for his Take the Crown album, whilst Barlow acquired the remaining numbers for Since I Saw You Last.

== Singles ==
- "Let Me Go" was released as the album's lead single on 15 November 2013, debuting at number three on the UK Singles Chart becoming Barlow's 21st UK top-three single. The following week, it rose to number two and was certified Silver by the BPI two weeks later for UK sales of over 200,000 copies.
- "Face to Face", featuring Elton John, was released as the second single from the album on 20 January 2014.
- "Since I Saw You Last" was released as the album's third and final single on 14 April 2014.

== Commercial performance ==
The album debuted at number two on the UK Albums Chart, behind One Direction's third album Midnight Memories, selling 116,000 copies. It became the fastest selling album of 2013 to miss out on the top spot, while also selling more copies in its first week than Barlow's Take That bandmate Robbie Williams' album Swings Both Ways, which sold 109,000 copies the previous week to claim the top spot. The following week, the album sold a further 77,358 copies in the UK. In its third week of release, it once again broke the 100,000 sales mark, with 105,344 sales. In its fourth week of sales, the album sold a further 116,730 copies, up 10.81% from the previous week, and passed sales of 500,000 in the UK with a further 79,000 sold the week after. The album was certified 2× Platinum in the UK at the beginning of 2014 with sales of 652,342 in the UK alone. The album also became Barlow's second top 10 album in Germany, achieving similar chart success to his debut record, Open Road.

== Critical reception ==
Professional ratings
Review scores
Source	Rating
AllMusic	4/5 stars
The Arts Desk	2/5 stars
Drowned in Sound	5/10
The Guardian	2/5 stars
The Independent	3/5 stars
London Evening Standard	3/5 stars
The Observer	1/5 stars
The Times	3/5 stars

At Metacritic, which assigns a normalised rating out of 100 to reviews from mainstream critics, Since I Saw You Last received an average score of 54, based on six reviews, which indicates "mixed or average reviews".

Stephen Thomas Erlewine at AllMusic awarded the record four stars, calling it a "handsome album" that "captures what was good about post-McCartney pop singer/songwriters in the mid-'70s, when the best songsmiths never let their ambitions get in the way of a good tune". Conversely, Observer writer Hermione Hoby gave a one-star review in which she said that the album serves to provide "sonic reference points" for "how unassailably uncool" Barlow is.

== Track listing ==
All tracks are written by Gary Barlow, additional songwriters are noted below.

Since I Saw You Last – Standard edition
No.	Title	Writer(s)	Length
1.	"Requiem"	Robbie Williams	4:42
2.	"Let Me Go"		3:44
3.	"Jump"	Tim Rice-Oxley	4:08
4.	"Face to Face" (featuring Elton John)	John Shanks	3:33
5.	"God"		5:04
6.	"Small Town Girls"		3:19
7.	"6th Avenue"	Shanks	5:00
8.	"We Like to Love"		5:26
9.	"Since I Saw You Last"		3:32
10.	"This House"	Shanks	3:58
11.	"Dying Inside"		4:33
12.	"More Than Life"		3:48

Since I Saw You Last – Deluxe edition (bonus tracks)
No.	Title	Writer(s)	Length
13.	"Mr Everything"		4:45
14.	"Actress"	James Maddock	3:31
15.	"The Song I'll Never Write"	Andrew Frampton; Steve Kipner	3:05

- The album is available in three different formats: standard 12-track CD/digital download, 15-track deluxe CD/digital download, and collector's box set available exclusively from Gary Barlow's official webstore, with a 24-page collector's booklet and an art print all collected together in a presentation box.

== Personnel ==
Musicians

- Gary Barlow – vocals, backing vocals (1–4, 6, 7, 10, 12, 14, 15), acoustic piano (1, 3–6, 9, 11, 12, 14), additional keyboards (1–9, 13)
- Ryan Carline – Pro Tools programming (1–10, 12–15), additional keyboards (1, 3, 4, 7, 10, 13), programming (2, 4, 5, 7, 8, 10)
- Rohan Onraet – Pro Tools programming (1–10, 12–15), programming (2, 4, 5, 7, 8, 10), percussion (2, 4, 5, 7), tambourine (14)
- Dave Arch – acoustic piano (2, 6, 7, 8, 10, 12)
- Massimo Restaino – accordion (2, 10)
- Pete Davis – programming (3, 9), additional keyboards (5)
- Ben Mark – guitars (1, 5, 13)
- Tim Van der Kuil – guitars (1–7, 9, 10, 12–15), banjo (2, 6, 10, 12), pedal steel guitar (2), mandolin (10, 12, 15), lap steel guitar (12)
- John Parricelli – guitars (2, 8)
- Steve Power – ukulele (6)
- Gary Nuttall – guitars (8)
- Neil Taylor – guitars (8, 13)
- Samuel Dixon – bass guitar (1, 2, 5, 6, 7, 10, 12–15)
- David Catlin-Birch – bass guitar (3, 9), backing vocals (4, 7), guitars (9)
- Dave Bronze – bass guitar (4, 8)
- Karl Brazil – drums (1)
- Jeremy Stacey – bass drum (2), drums (3–10, 12–15), percussion (15)
- Fergus Gerrand – percussion (1, 13)
- Andy Duncan – percussion (8)
- Caroline Dale – cello (11)
- Jenna Mahon – violin (13)
- Mark Feltham – harmonica (14)
- Tom Richards – clarinet (15)
- Owen Slade – tuba (15)
- Will Wheaton – string arrangements (1, 5, 7, 8)
- Nick Ingman – string arrangements (3, 4, 6, 10)
- Perry Montague-Mason – string leader (1, 3–8, 10)
- Isobel Griffiths – musicians contractor (1, 3–8, 10)
- Andy Caine – backing vocals (2, 12)
- Ami Richardson – backing vocals (2, 7, 10)
- John Shanks – backing vocals (4), 12-string guitar (10)
- Elton John – vocals (4)

Production

- Steve Power – producer, mixing (1, 3, 5–15)
- Ryan Carline – engineer
- Richard Lancaster – engineer (1, 4, 5, 8)
- Rohan Onraet – engineer (1–10, 12–15)
- Sam OKell – engineer (3, 6, 7, 9)
- Joe Kearns – engineer (8)
- Mark "Spike" Stent – mixing (2, 4)
- Tony Cousins – mastering
- Studio Fury – art direction, design
- Phil Poynter – photography

== Charts ==
=== Weekly charts ===
Weekly chart performance for Since I Saw You Last
Chart (2013)	Peak position
Austrian Albums (Ö3 Austria)	27
Belgian Albums (Ultratop Flanders)	179
Croatian Albums (IFPI)	11
Europe (Euro Digital Albums)	4
German Albums (Offizielle Top 100)	10
Irish Albums (IRMA)	2
Scottish Albums (OCC)	1
Swiss Albums (Schweizer Hitparade)	91
UK Albums (OCC)	2

=== Year-end charts ===
2013 year-end chart performance for Since I Saw You Last
Chart (2013)	Position
UK Albums (OCC)	9

2014 year-end chart performance for Since I Saw You Last
Chart (2014)	Position
UK Albums (OCC)	28

=== Decade-end charts ===
Decade-end chart performance for Since I Saw You Last
Chart (2010–2019)	Position
UK Albums (OCC)	92

== Certifications ==
Certifications for Since I Saw You Last
Region	Certification	Certified units/sales
Ireland (IRMA)	Gold	7,500^{^}
United Kingdom (BPI)	2× Platinum	702,587
^{^} Shipments figures based on certification alone.

== Release history ==
Release history and formats for Since I Saw You Last
Country	Date	Edition(s)	Format	Label
Ireland	22 November 2013	Standard, deluxe	CD, digital download	Polydor
United Kingdom	25 November 2013	Standard, deluxe	CD, digital download	Polydor
Germany	24 February 2014	Standard, deluxe	CD, digital download	Polydor
