= Open Road (Gary Barlow song) =

1997 single by Gary Barlow

Single by Gary Barlow

from the album Open Road
- B-side: "Hang On in There Baby" (live); "So Help Me Girl" (live); "Back for Good" (live)
- Released: 3 November 1997
- Length: 4:23
- Label: RCA; BMG
- Songwriter: Gary Barlow
- Producers: Gary Barlow; Chris Porter

Gary Barlow singles chronology
"So Help Me Girl" (1997)	"Open Road" (1997)	"Superhero" (1998)

"Open Road" is a song by British singer-songwriter Gary Barlow, released in November 1997 by RCA and BMG as the fourth single from his debut solo album, Open Road (1997).

== Background ==
Following the release of "So Help Me Girl", Barlow announced that 'Open Road' would be the last single to be released from the album in Europe. However, following its release, 'Open Road' peaked at No. 7 on the UK Singles Chart as well as becoming his third fourth consecutive top-two single in Lithuania and fourth song to chart in Ireland and Germany, respectively. After the single was released Barlow's record label began the process of preparing the recording of a second album. However, his next single, "Stronger", only reached No. 16 on the UK Singles Chart, and as such, 'Open Road' is viewed as his last successful single, until the release of 2010 single Shame and Barlow's third No. 1 single on the UK Singles Chart, "Sing" in 2012. Barlow himself regards Open Road as "the best song on the album".

== Critical reception ==
A reviewer from Music Week gave "Open Road" a full score of five out of five, adding, "The one shining light from his disappointing solo album is a comforting assurance that Barlow can still live up to the potential that Back For Good promised." The magazine's Alan Jones noted the samples from Mr. Mister's 1985 hit "Kyrie", saying, "It's a ploy that works well, however, giving this mid-tempo plodder an instant familiarity. Gary contributes a fine vocal, and the whole thing gels very nicely, providing a potential pause in the downward spiral of his recent singles."

== Music video ==
The accompanying music video for "Open Road" begins with Barlow sitting in his car, watching as rain pours down outside. The scene then cuts to a shot of Barlow performing inside a social club, where dancers and backing vocalists are performing around him. After the first chorus, the video cuts to Barlow walking along a highway, through an underground train station and arriving at the club where he is performing. However, this time, the scene alternates, as he throws his jacket to the ground, moves into the centre of the stage and performs directly to camera. The video finishes with Barlow returning to his car, realising that the hope he has been searching for is inside of him, which is indicated by the image in his rearside mirror. The music video uses the Rose & Foster mix.

== Track listings ==
- UK CD1
1. "Open Road" (Rose + Foster mix) – 4:28
2. "Open Road" (Mr. Pink mix) – 4:44
3. "Hang On in There Baby" (live) – 3:53
4. "So Help Me Girl" (live) – 4:16
- UK CD2 and Australian CD single
1. "Open Road" (Rose + Foster mix) – 4:28
2. "Open Road" (Mr. Pink mix) – 4:44
3. "Back for Good" (live) – 4:01
4. "Open Road" (live) – 4:24
- UK cassette single
1. "Open Road" (Rose + Foster mix) – 4:28
2. "Back for Good" (live) – 4:01
3. "Open Road" (Mr. Pink mix) – 4:44
- European CD single
1. "Open Road" (Rose + Foster mix) – 4:28
2. "Back for Good" (live) – 4:01
- Japanese CD single
1. "Open Road" (Rose + Foster mix) – 4:28
2. "Open Road" (Mr. Pink mix) – 4:44
3. "Hang On in There Baby" (live) – 3:53
4. "So Help Me Girl" (live) – 4:16
5. "Back for Good" (live) – 4:01

== Charts ==
=== Weekly charts ===
Chart (1997–1998)	Peak position
Estonia (Eesti Top 20)	1
Estonia Airplay (Eesti Top 25)	5
Europe (Eurochart Hot 100)	34
Europe (European Hit Radio)	12
Germany (GfK)	63
Iceland (Íslenski Listinn Topp 40)	31
Ireland (IRMA)	29
Japan International (Oricon)	11
Latvia (Latvijas Top 40)	5
Lithuania (M-1)	2
Scottish Singles Sales (Official Charts)	10
UK Singles (Official Charts)	7
UK Airplay (Music Week)	2

=== Year-end charts ===
Chart (1997)	Position
UK Singles (OCC)	176

Chart (1998)	Position
Latvia (Latvijas Top 50)	97

== Release history ==
Region	Date	Format(s)	Label(s)	Ref.
United Kingdom	3 November 1997	CD; cassette	RCA; BMG	
Japan	21 November 1997	CD	RCA; BMG	
