= Stronger (Gary Barlow song) =

Single by Gary Barlow

from the album Twelve Months, Eleven Days
- B-side: "Wondering"; "Looking For Change"
- Released: July 5, 1999
- Recorded: Late 1998
- Genre: Dance-pop; house
- Length: 3:41
- Label: Sony BMG
- Songwriters: Gary Barlow; Graham Gouldman
- Producers: Jon Douglas; Brian Rawling

Gary Barlow singles chronology
"Hang On in There Baby" (1998)	"Stronger" (1999)	"For All That You Want" (1999)

"Stronger" is the first single from British singer-songwriter Gary Barlow's second studio album, Twelve Months, Eleven Days (1999). The single was released on July 5, 1999, and was Barlow's first solo excursion into dance music.

== Song information ==
According to his autobiography, Barlow objected to "Stronger" being released as a single. He believed that due to its dance-orientated background, it would prove less popular amongst fans. However, after much deliberation, Sony BMG decided to release the track as a single, believing that fans would enjoy something different, rather than Barlow's regular pop-ballad style.

"Stronger" was performed live many times before it was announced as a single, most notably at 95.8 Capital FM's Party in the Park, and as the finalists' dance track on Italian talent show Festivalbar.

== Music video ==
The video for the track was filmed in Vancouver, British Columbia, Canada. Barlow stated in his autobiography that he wanted to be constantly doing something in the video so Director Dani Jacobs changed the original concept of the video.

The video begins with Barlow leaving his work place in the pouring rain as he makes his way to his car. Barlow went on record to say that Vancouver was forecast to experience heavy showers during the dates when the music video was due to be shot and recorded. However the weather was the complete opposite leaving them having to use a rain machine to create the desired effect for the video. As Barlow drives the car suddenly pulls to a stop leaving Barlow to try to diagnose the problem as traffic builds behind him. He then begins to push the car alone leading to huge traffic which is then reported by news channels as they beam it live to television from helicopters as cars crash into each other and Police try and respond to the disturbance. The video ends with Barlow reaching a bridge and stopping the car as he walks away from the camera and the news channels cease reporting.

== Track listings ==
UK CD Single #1

1. "Stronger" (Metro Mix) - 3:41
2. "Stronger" (Metro Extended Mix) - 5:32
3. "Wondering" - 3:07

UK CD Single #2

1. "Stronger" (Mark's In Vocal Mix) - 5:41
2. "Looking For Change" - 4:15
3. "Stronger" (Video) - 3:41

UK Cassette Single

1. "Stronger" (Metro Mix) - 3:41
2. "Wondering" - 3:07

UK Promotional Single

1. "Stronger" (Radio Edit) - 3:37
2. "Radio Espana Interview, April 1998" - 11:35

UK 12" Vinyl Set

1. "Stronger" (Mark's In Vocal Mix) - 5:41
2. "Stronger" (Mark's Delicious Dub) - 9:38
3. "Stronger" (Metro Extended Mix) - 5:32
4. "DMC Megamix" - 10:14

== Charts ==
=== Weekly charts ===
Chart (1999)	Peak position
Belgium (Ultratip Vlaanderen)	17
Czech Republic (IFPI)	27
Europe (Eurochart Hot 100)	52
Europe (European Hit Radio)	19
Finland (Suomen virallinen lista)	11
Finland Airplay (Radiosoittolista)	10
Germany (Media Control AG)	73
Iceland (Íslenski Listinn Topp 40)	32
Italy Airplay (Music & Media)	8
Lithuania (M-1)	3
Poland Airplay (Music & Media)	5
Scottish Singles Sales (Official Charts)	18
UK Singles (Official Charts)	16
UK Airplay (Music Week)	27

=== Year-end charts ===
Chart (1999)	Position
Europe (European Hit Radio)	87
