= Lie to Me (Gary Barlow song) =

Single by Gary Barlow

from the album Twelve Months, Eleven Days
- B-side: "I Hate It This Way"; "Put Your Trust in Me"
- Released: 6 December 1999 (withdrawn)
- Recorded: October–November 1998
- Genre: Pop
- Length: 3:42 (radio edit); 5:32 (album version)
- Label: Sony BMG
- Songwriter(s): Gary Barlow
- Producer(s): Gary Barlow

Gary Barlow singles chronology
"For All That You Want" (1999)	"Lie to Me" (1999)	"Shame" (2010)

"Lie to Me" is a song by British singer-songwriter Gary Barlow from his second studio album, Twelve Months, Eleven Days. It was due to be released on 6 December 1999 as the third and final single from the album, but its release was cancelled by Barlow's record company, Sony BMG.

== Background ==
"Lie to Me" was widely considered to be one of the best songs that Barlow had written and performed. Many fans and critics alike described the song as the type of single that would return Barlow to the top of the charts. Performed as the penultimate song on his 'For the Fans' tour, Barlow described the song as "lavish, slow and powerful" and in 2012, claimed it was the best song from the album, Twelve Months, Eleven Days. Barlow later revived the song, performing it during his Gary Barlow: In Concert tour. The single was first announced in July 1999; but at that time, Barlow said he was on the receiving end of non-supportive press and backlash from the media, due to a slating from Robbie Williams, who claimed his songs were much better than Barlow's. In October 1999, it was announced that Sony BMG had decided against releasing the single officially, and that Barlow was due to be dropped from the record company in early 2000. The track listing for the official release of the single appears in an unauthorised biography of Take That, entitled Now and Then, however, no copies of the single were actually produced.

== Track listing ==
- UK CD single #1 (withdrawn)
1. "Lie to Me" (Radio Edit) – 3:42
2. "I Hate It This Way" – 3:11
3. "Put Your Trust in Me" – 4:18
4. "Lie to Me" (Video) – 3:43
- UK CD single #2 (withdrawn)
1. "Lie to Me" (Album Version) – 5:32
2. "Nothing Without You" (Demo) – 3:18
3. "Never Forget" (Live from Wembley Arena) – 6:08
- UK cassette (withdrawn)
1. "Lie to Me" (Radio Edit) – 3:42
2. "I Hate It This Way" – 3:11
