= Sing (Gary Barlow & The Commonwealth Band album) =

Studio album by Gary Barlow and various artists
- Released: 25 May 2012
- Recorded: 2012
- Genre: Pop; sunshine pop; baroque pop
- Length: 24:07
- Label: Decca
- Producer: Steven Baker, Gary Barlow, Ryan Carline, Jon Cohen, Eliot Kennedy, Steve Power

Gary Barlow chronology
Twelve Months, Eleven Days (1999)	Sing (2012)	Since I Saw You Last (2013)

Singles from Sing
- 1. "Sing" Released: 28 May 2012

Sing is the third solo studio album released by British singer-songwriter Gary Barlow. The album was released through Decca Records on 25 May 2012 and features The Commonwealth Band which was created by Barlow to commemorate the Diamond Jubilee of Elizabeth II.

== Background ==
With Take That on hiatus after the completion of their record breaking Progress Live tour in 2011, Barlow was approached by the Queen's advisers to discuss his writing of a song which would become the official single of the Diamond Jubilee. Barlow then begun to shape ideas before enlisting the help of Andrew Lloyd Webber who was also asked to create a piece of music for the celebrations.

== Release ==
Once the title track, "Sing", was written, Barlow then re-recorded his version of "Here Comes the Sun" by The Beatles, which was used previously in a UK advertising campaign for Marks & Spencer, and added it to the release. Further to this he then worked with other singers and recorded new versions of older songs which were also included.

== Chart performance ==
The album entered the UK Albums Chart at number 1 with sales of 40,020, becoming Barlow's second number 1 album since Open Road which was released in May 1997. The album now holds the record for the shortest playing number one album in chart history. The album also reached number 1 on the Scottish Albums Chart and number 61 in Ireland. The album remained at number 1 in the UK Albums Chart the following week, selling 75,538 copies—the third highest weekly sale by any artist album in 2012, and the highest for 16 weeks. "Sing" also rose from 11 to number 1, making Barlow the first artist in 2012 to be number 1 on the album and singles chart in the same week. Upon the announcement of the album entering at number 1, Barlow said "I couldn't have wished for anything more on this momentous weekend!" in reference to the Diamond Jubilee celebrations. Lord Andrew Lloyd Webber, co-writer of lead single "Sing", added: "I'm absolutely thrilled, this is a burst of sunshine on a rainy Sunday".

== Track listing ==
No.	Title	Writer(s)	Producer(s)	Length
1.	"Sing" (featuring The Commonwealth Band and Military Wives)	Gary Barlow, Andrew Lloyd Webber	Eliot Kennedy, Gary Barlow, Ryan Carline	4:35
2.	"Sing" (Gary Barlow version)	Gary Barlow, Andrew Lloyd Webber	Ryan Carline, Gary Barlow	4:01
3.	"Here Comes the Sun"	George Harrison	Steve Power	2:42
4.	"Amazing Grace" (featuring Hayley Westenra)	John Newton	Ryan Carline, Gary Barlow	3:12
5.	"Stronger As One" (featuring Laura Wright)	Robert Hartshorne	Steven Baker	3:28
6.	"Land of Hope and Glory" (featuring Alfie Boe and Military Wives)	Edward Elgar, A. C. Benson	Steven Baker	3:30
7.	"God Save the Queen (National Anthem)" (featuring Laura Wright)	Thomas Arne	Jon Cohen	2:39

== Charts ==
=== Weekly charts ===
Chart (2012)	Peak position
Australian Albums (ARIA)	87
Irish Albums (IRMA)	61
Scottish Albums (OCC)	1
UK Albums (OCC)	1
UK Download (OCC Download)	1

=== Year-end charts ===
Chart (2012)	Position
UK Albums (OCC)	54

== Certifications ==
Region	Certification	Certified units/sales
United Kingdom (BPI)	Gold	100,000^{*}
^{*} Sales figures based on certification alone.

== Release history ==
Country	Date	Format	Label
Ireland	25 May 2012	CD, digital download	Decca Records
United Kingdom	28 May 2012	CD, digital download	Decca Records
