= Since I Saw You Last (song) =

Single by Gary Barlow

from the album Since I Saw You Last
- Released: 14 April 2014
- Recorded: 2013
- Genre: Pop rock
- Length: 3:33
- Label: Polydor
- Songwriter: Gary Barlow
- Producer: Steve Power

Gary Barlow singles chronology
"Face to Face" (2014)	"Since I Saw You Last" (2014)	"Paddington Bear" (2019)

"Since I Saw You Last" is a song by British singer-songwriter Gary Barlow. It was released in the United Kingdom on 14 April 2014 as the third and final single from his fourth solo album, Since I Saw You Last (2013). It was written by Barlow and produced by Steve Power.

== Background ==
"Since I Saw You Last" tells the story of Barlow's struggle to become a successful solo artist after Take That split in 1996, and how the media backlash against him in favour of bandmate Robbie Williams left him in the verge of breakdown, leading to his eventual departure from his record label. Barlow described this song to Graham Norton as the song he always wanted to write but it was only now, after the success of Take That and his solo success that he felt it was time to record the song and release it as a single.

The song is described as one of survival against the odds and emerging stronger than before, where Barlow passionately sings about being a 'dead man walking' and having to accept the events in the past and remember the lessons learned.

== Music video ==
On the same day as the official announcement of the single release, Barlow revealed details for the official music video to accompany the song. Barlow asked fans to send him home movies and examples of them overcoming adversity that would appear within his music video, as a way of replicating his feelings of determination told in the song and demonstrating the resilience of human nature.

The new music video, directed by frequent collaborator Ben Winston, debuted on Barlow's Vevo page on 23 March 2014, shot in black and white, it shows Barlow performing the song and considering the past.

== Track listing ==
- CD promo single
1. "Since I Saw You Last" (single mix) – 3:04
2. "Since I Saw You Last" (instrumental version) – 3:32

== Credits and personnel ==
- Gary Barlow – songwriter, vocals, piano, additional keyboards, backing vocals
- Steve Power – producer
- Mark "Spike" Stent – mixer
- Ryan Carline – engineer, additional keyboards, programming
- Rohan Onraet – engineer, percussion, programming
- Richard Lancaster – engineer
- Tim van der Kuil – guitar
- Dave Bronze – bass
- Jeremy Stacey – drums
- David Catlin-Birch – backing vocals
- Nick Ingman – string arrangement
- Perry Montague-Mason – string leader
- Isobel Griffiths – musicians' contractor
- Tony Cousins – mastering

Credits adapted from Since I Saw You Last liner notes.

== Charts ==
Chart (2014)	Peak position
Scottish Singles Sales (Official Charts)	58
UK Singles (Official Charts)	65
UK Airplay (Music Week)	14
