= So Help Me Girl =

1995 single by Joe Diffie

Single by Joe Diffie

from the album Third Rock from the Sun
- B-side: "The Cows Came Home"
- Released: January 30, 1995
- Genre: Country
- Length: 3:29
- Label: Epic
- Songwriters: Howard Perdew, Andy Spooner
- Producers: Johnny Slate, Joe Diffie

Joe Diffie singles chronology
"Pickup Man" (1994)	"So Help Me Girl" (1995)	"I'm in Love with a Capital "U"" (1995)

"So Help Me Girl" is a song written by Howard Perdew and Andy Spooner and recorded by American country music singer Joe Diffie. It was released in January 1995 as the third single from his fourth studio album, Third Rock from the Sun (1994). There are two versions of the song that exist. The single version is exactly the same as the one found on Diffie's 1996 greatest hits album, with a high note at the end of the second chorus.The song reached number two on the Billboard Hot Country Singles & Tracks chart, where it debuted at number 59 for the week of February 4, 1995, and number 84 on the Billboard Hot 100.

== Music video ==
The music video for "So Help Me Girl" was directed by Gerry Wenner and premiered in early 1995.

== Charts ==
=== Weekly charts ===
Chart (1995)	Peak position
Canada Country Singles (RPM)	1
US Billboard Hot 100	84
US Hot Country Songs (Billboard)	2

=== Year-end charts ===
Chart (1995)	Position
Canada Country Tracks (RPM)	57
US Hot Country Songs (Billboard)	41

== Gary Barlow version ==
"So Help Me Girl"

Single by Gary Barlow

from the album Open Road
- B-side: "Million to One", "Offer My Peace"
- Released: July 14, 1997
- Genre: Pop
- Length: 4:29
- Label: RCA, BMG
- Songwriters: Howard Perdew, Andy Spooner
- Producer: David Foster

Gary Barlow UK singles chronology
"Love Won't Wait" (1997)	"So Help Me Girl" (1997)	"Open Road" (1997)

Gary Barlow US singles chronology
"So Help Me Girl" (1997)	"Superhero" (1998)

Music video
- "So Help Me Girl" on YouTube

Alternative cover
- American cover

"So Help Me Girl" was covered by English singer and songwriter Gary Barlow, and released as the third single from his debut solo album, Open Road (1997), in the United Kingdom on July 14, 1997, and as the lead single from the album in the US later in the year. Following the success of the album in the UK, Barlow signed a record deal with Arista records for it to be released in the US. He reworked the album for the American market and subsequently released a remixed version of "So Help Me Girl" as the lead single there.

Produced by David Foster, "So Help Me Girl" was released in 65 countries around the world and topped the charts in 13 of them. In the UK, it peaked at number 11 on the UK Singles Chart. In the US, the single peaked at number 44 on the Billboard Hot 100 (Barlow's only solo hit on that chart), number three on the Billboard Adult Contemporary Chart and number 58 on the Billboard Radio Charts.

=== Critical reception ===
Larry Flick from Billboard magazine gave the American version of "So Help Me Girl" a positive review, saying that it did not stray from Barlow's work in the group Take That. He also praised his "boyish teen-idol charm" and "flexible tenor." A reviewer from Music Week rated it three out of five, adding that "the song's Nashville roots are barely discernible on this David Foster update which turns it into a swoony, low-key ballad to give Barlow another hit." David Sinclair from The Times wrote, "Old country song given a dreary, pop ballad treatment."

=== Music video ===
Two music videos were released for "So Help Me Girl". The first video, accompanying the European release of the single, similar to the music video for Diffie's version, features Barlow taking a girl home after a night out, and waking up the next morning and realising that he has cheated on his girlfriend. He performs the majority of the song in the bedroom, before moving to a piano for the final scenes, which depict a fight between his girlfriend and the girl he took home. The second video, accompanying the American release of the single, begins with Barlow sitting alone on a bridge and throwing a rose into the water below, whilst a mysterious woman looks on. He then continues to perform the song whilst looking through the windows of a darkened house, where he spots a young girl. The video continues with Barlow walking through a lighted tunnel of moving cars, before returning to the house and performing the final line of the song to the girl personally.

=== Track listings ===
- UK CD1 and Australian CD single
1. "So Help Me Girl"
2. "Million to One"
3. "Offer My Peace"
4. "So Help Me Girl" (C Swing mix)
- UK CD2
1. "So Help Me Girl"
2. "So Help Me Girl" (Peter Mokran mix)
3. "Interview"
- UK cassette single and European CD single
1. "So Help Me Girl"
2. "Million to One"
- US CD and cassette single
1. "So Help Me Girl" – 4:29
2. "Back for Good" (live) – 4:03
- Japanese CD single
1. "So Help Me Girl"
2. "Million to One"
3. "Offer My Peace"

=== Charts ===
==== Weekly charts ====
Chart (1997)	Peak position
Australia (ARIA)	36
Belgium (Ultratip Bubbling Under Flanders)	7
Canada Adult Contemporary (RPM)	6
Estonia (Eesti Top 20)	5
Estonia Airplay (Eesti Top 25)	22
Europe (Eurochart Hot 100)	41
Europe (European Hit Radio)	14
Germany (GfK)	78
Ireland (IRMA)	14
Israel (Israeli Singles Chart)	28
Japan International (Oricon)	7
Netherlands (Dutch Top 40 Tipparade)	4
Netherlands (Single Top 100)	58
Scottish Singles Sales (Official Charts)	13
Spain Airplay (Top 40 Radio)	9
Taiwan (IFPI)	3
UK Singles (Official Charts)	11
UK Airplay (Music Week)	20
US Billboard Hot 100	44
US Adult Contemporary (Billboard)	3
US Adult Contemporary (Radio & Records)	1
US CHR/Pop Top 50 (Radio & Records)	39

==== Year-end charts ====
Chart (1997)	Position
Brazil (Crowley)	98
Canada Adult Contemporary (RPM)	86

Chart (1998)	Position
Canada Adult Contemporary (RPM)	42
US Adult Contemporary (Billboard)	28
US Adult Contemporary (Radio & Records)	38

=== Release history ===
Region	Date	Format(s)	Label(s)	Ref.
United Kingdom	July 14, 1997	CD; cassette	RCA; BMG	
Japan	July 24, 1997	CD	RCA; BMG	

== Other versions ==
Mark Wills and Nate Smith covered the song on Hardy's 2024 mixtape, Hixtape: Vol. 3: Difftape.
