= Face to Face (Gary Barlow song) =

Single by Gary Barlow featuring Elton John

from the album Since I Saw You Last
- Released: 20 January 2014
- Recorded: 2013
- Genre: Pop
- Length: 3:34
- Label: Polydor
- Songwriters: Gary Barlow; John Shanks
- Producer: Steve Power

Gary Barlow singles chronology
"I Should've Followed You Home" (2013)	"Face to Face" (2014)	"Since I Saw You Last" (2014)

"Face to Face" is a song by British singer-songwriter Gary Barlow featuring Elton John. It was released in the United Kingdom on 20 January 2014 as the second single from his fourth solo album, Since I Saw You Last (2013). It was written by Barlow and John Shanks, and it was produced by Steve Power.

== Background ==
When writing Since I Saw You Last, Barlow came up with a song called "Face to Face", and knew straight away that he wanted to try to get his friend Sir Elton John to sing it with him. Barlow says: "I called him and said I am going to email you this song. Literally, within an hour he was back saying let’s book a studio, let’s get in there and do it." They both met up in Abbey Road Studios and recorded the vocals to the song in 10 minutes.

When speaking about the meaning behind the song, Barlow states that "Face to Face" is a thank-you note to Elton for sticking by him during his wilderness years and a pointed rejoinder to those who deserted him. "It’s a respect song" Barlow confirms. "I can count on the fingers of one hand the people who kept in touch with me when nobody else wanted to know me and he was one of them. I’ll never forget that."

== Music video ==
The video was filmed in Abbey Road Studios on the same day as both Barlow and Elton John recorded the vocals to the song. The video shows Barlow passing the lyrics to Elton with both singing the song to each other around a piano and in the vocal booths.

== Track listing ==
- CD promo single
1. "Face to Face" (album version) – 3:33
2. "Face to Face" (instrumental version) – 3:34

== Credits and personnel ==
- Gary Barlow – songwriter, vocals, piano, additional keyboards, backing vocals
- John Shanks – songwriter, backing vocals
- Elton John – vocals
- Steve Power – producer
- Mark "Spike" Stent – mixer
- Ryan Carline – engineer, additional keyboards, programming
- Rohan Onraet – engineer, percussion, programming
- Richard Lancaster – engineer
- Tim van der Kuil – guitar
- Dave Bronze – bass
- Jeremy Stacey – drums
- David Catlin-Birch – backing vocals
- Nick Ingman – string arrangement
- Perry Montague-Mason – string leader
- Isobel Griffiths – musicians' contractor
- Tony Cousins – mastering

Credits adapted from Since I Saw You Last liner notes.

== Charts ==
Chart (2014)	Peak position
Belgium (Ultratip Bubbling Under Flanders)	55
Belgium (Ultratip Bubbling Under Wallonia)	14
Ireland (IRMA)	75
Scotland (OCC)	61
UK Singles (OCC)	69
UK Airplay (Music Week)	14
