= Let Me Go (Gary Barlow song) =

Single by Gary Barlow

from the album Since I Saw You Last
- Released: 15 November 2013
- Recorded: 2013
- Genre: Folk pop
- Length: 3:38
- Label: Polydor
- Songwriter: Gary Barlow
- Producer: Steve Power

Gary Barlow singles chronology
"Sing" (2012)	"Let Me Go" (2013)	"I Should've Followed You Home" (2013)

"Let Me Go" is a song by British singer-songwriter Gary Barlow. It was released in Ireland on 15 November 2013 and in the United Kingdom on 17 November 2013 as the lead single from his fourth solo album, Since I Saw You Last (2013). It was written by Barlow and produced by Steve Power. "Let Me Go" peaked at number two in the UK Singles Chart, becoming Barlow's sixth solo top 10 hit in the UK.

== Background ==
In November 2012, Barlow announced a concert tour, Gary Barlow: In Concert, which sold out minutes after going on sale. During these shows, Barlow played across the UK, when he began to consider returning to the studio to write what would become his first full-length studio album in over 14 years. As he began writing material for the album, Since I Saw You Last, he wrote "Let Me Go" and knew it should be the lead single.

Barlow revealed in a TV documentary that "Let Me Go" was written about the loss of his stillborn daughter Poppy and the traumatic period in his life which left him and wife Dawn devastated. He said that the song keeps Poppy's "flame" alive and is a "celebration" of her. Barlow added: "I don't like there to be things that are unsaid really... and from that thing happening to my dad's passing, there's a lot of them in this record with me. It should be a celebration of that song because, in some respects, it's alive that record and those lyrics and what it relates to. It keeps a life and a flame in the whole thing".

"Let Me Go" has been described as an acoustic guitar-driven song with a catchy chorus. It represents a change in musical style to Barlow's past material. He attributes this to his listening to musical influences such as Johnny Cash when deciding which direction he wanted to take his record. He said: "I've always liked folky, acoustic music but I've never fully explored it. I turned back time and was listening to Johnny Cash and early Elton John before I wrote 'Let Me Go'". Numerous music critics noted the "Mumford & Sons vibe" and influence.

== Music video ==
The video was filmed in New York City in September 2013 and was directed by Ben Winston. The video begins with Barlow walking through the streets of Williamsburg, Brooklyn, interacting with passers-by and shop workers trying to locate something. A person directs him to an old shop, which he leaves with a second-hand piano. He then wheels the piano across Brooklyn and places it in the middle of a quiet street. He then leaves the piano and returns with two pieces of wood to use as a seat, before launching into the second verse of the song.

This attracts the attention of the surrounding neighbourhood, with musicians joining in with Barlow and the piano. Local people and police officers soon gather around and join in with the song and dance around Barlow before everyone erupting into applause as the song draws to a close, with Barlow looking around at everyone in gratitude and appreciation.

== Promotion ==
The song received its first radio play on BBC Radio 2 and Heart Radio on 4 October 2013, with Barlow being in attendance for both radio spins. A lyric video was uploaded onto YouTube later that day. "Let Me Go" was soon placed on the Radio 2 A Playlist and continues to be listed. Barlow also performed on the sixth live results show of The X Factor on 17 November 2013. In addition, he performed the track on The Jonathan Ross Show on 23 November 2013.

== Chart performance ==
Let Me Go entered the UK Singles Chart at number 3 with 72,423 copies sold in its first week on sale, giving Barlow his 21st top 3 UK single. The following week it rose to No. 2 selling a further 60,422 copies. In Scotland the single debuted at number 1, and entered the top ten in the Irish IRMA charts. For the third week in a row, "Let Me Go" remained in top 5 in the UK charts selling 33,512 copies and remained at no. 2 in the Scottish official chart. During its fourth week of release it once again sold over 30,000 copies, being certified Silver by the BPI. The single has since been certified Gold.

As of November 2020, "Let Me Go" has moved a total of 558,000 units in the United Kingdom, the most for any Barlow single.

== Track listing ==
- Digital download
1. "Let Me Go" – 3:38
- UK CD promo single
1. "Let Me Go" (album version) – 3:40
2. "Let Me Go" (instrumental version) – 3:40

== Credits and personnel ==
- Gary Barlow – songwriter, vocals, additional keyboards, backing vocals
- Steve Power – producer
- Mark "Spike" Stent – mixer
- Ryan Carline – engineer, programming
- Rohan Onraet – engineer, percussion, programming
- Tim van der Kuil – guitar, banjo, pedal steel guitar
- John Parricelli – guitar
- Sam Dixon – double bass
- Jeremy Stacey – drums
- David Arch – piano
- Massimo Restaino – accordion
- Andy Caine – backing vocals
- Ami Richardson – backing vocals
- Tony Cousins – mastering

Credits adapted from Since I Saw You Last liner notes.

== Charts ==
=== Weekly charts ===
Chart (2013–2014)	Peak position
Austria (Ö3 Austria Top 75)	32
Belgium (Ultratip Bubbling Under Flanders)	90
Belgium (Ultratip Bubbling Under Wallonia)	10
Europe (Euro Digital Songs)	5
Germany (Media Control Charts)	25
Ireland (IRMA)	8
Scottish Singles Sales (Official Charts)	1
Slovenia (SloTop50)	22
UK Singles (Official Charts)	2
UK Airplay (Music Week)	1

=== Year-end charts ===
Chart (2013)	Position
UK Singles (Official Charts Company)	78

== Certifications ==
Region	Certification	Certified units/sales
United Kingdom (BPI)	Platinum	600,000^{‡}
^{‡} Sales+streaming figures based on certification alone.
