= Sing (Gary Barlow song) =

2012 single by Gary Barlow and the Commonwealth Band

Single by Gary Barlow & the Commonwealth Band featuring Military Wives

from the album Sing
- Released: 28 May 2012
- Recorded: 2012
- Genre: Pop
- Length: 4:35
- Label: Decca
- Composers: Gary Barlow; Andrew Lloyd Webber
- Lyricist: Gary Barlow
- Producers: Gary Barlow; Eliot Kennedy; Ryan Carline

Gary Barlow singles chronology
"Teardrop" (2011)	"Sing" (2012)	"Let Me Go" (2013)

Military Wives singles chronology
"In My Heads" (2012)	"Sing" (2012)

"Sing" is a song written by British singer-songwriter Gary Barlow, of Take That, and British composer Andrew Lloyd Webber, and performed by a number of artists assembled by Barlow from across the Commonwealth, to commemorate the Diamond Jubilee of Queen Elizabeth II of the United Kingdom. The track was released via digital download and CD single on 28 May 2012, and was performed as part of the Elizabeth II's Diamond Jubilee Concert celebrations on 4 June 2012. "Sing" peaked at the top of the UK Singles Chart.

== Background ==
It was announced in January that six-time Ivor Novello recipient Gary Barlow and world-renowned composer Andrew Lloyd Webber would be working together to write the official Diamond Jubilee single. Barlow and Lloyd Webber aimed to write the music to the song before Barlow would travel the Commonwealth looking for musicians, singers and contributors and begin writing the lyrics and producing the song as he visited remote villages and countries from across the Caribbean, Africa, the Pacific Islands and Australasia to find singers to perform in front of the Queen. Barlow said of the project: "This is probably the biggest challenge I've ever taken on musically. I'm so excited and thrilled to be a part of it." Lloyd Webber echoed these views and stated: "It is a huge honour to be involved in this historic occasion and I am looking forward very much to working with Gary."

== Composition ==
Barlow revealed that the music of the song was written in January during "an afternoon round at [Lloyd Webber's] house, [with a] couple of pianos and it was really good fun actually." He said that they "did all the melodies in an afternoon and then I waited to do the lyrics until I got to Kenya". Speaking about writing the track with Barlow, Lord Lloyd-Webber said: "We got together with embryonic ideas. Gary had an idea for the chorus, I had the idea for the verse, we both agreed that the message was about the Commonwealth. I was thinking 'anthem', but we had to involve all the people we could, and it had to be something very simple that people could learn. Working with Gary has been one of the great joys, he is such a fantastic songwriter, it was a completely new experience."

The lyrics were written by Barlow whilst visiting villages in Kenya, where Princess Elizabeth had been visiting when she was told that her father King George VI had died and that she had ascended to the throne. Barlow said "She was in Kenya on holiday when she found out her father had died and she found out she was the Queen so I drove to this place called Treetops and I wrote". Barlow went on to say that "She started her reign there and we started our record in that place" and it was fitting that the song would return to those origins. The final version of "Sing" was completed and mastered during April 2012, and was given its premiere radio play on 18 May 2012 on Chris Evans' BBC Radio 2 Breakfast Show. The final record features more than two-hundred singers and musicians, including a guest appearance from Prince Harry on tambourine, the African Children's Choir, the Kibera Drummers from Kenya as well as the Military Wives Choir conducted by Gareth Malone, well-known musicians such as reggae duo Sly and Robbie, and ska guitarist Ernest Ranglin. The song was handed over to the Queen at the beginning of May, with Barlow and Lloyd Webber presenting her a framed copy of the sheet music whilst also performing the song to her for the first time. As Prince Charles had predicted, she was most interested in the people on the screen – 'What are they playing and where are they and who are they?’. To this Barlow told her "all the stories about the people and the places and where they lived and who they were and she loved it."

== Music video ==
The official music video for Sing premiered on 18 May 2012, via Barlow's official YouTube account. It was also premiered in full on the BBC during The One Show. It features Barlow's journey across the Commonwealth creating the song, and adding the vocals and instruments from various countries. It also includes clips of Prince Charles, Prince Harry and of Barlow and Lloyd Webber writing the music to the song as well as the mastering and addition of the orchestra to the track. The video also included excerpts from the recording of the single at Abbey Road Studios with 'The Military Wives' Choir' featuring military wives from 10 different Military Wives Choirs, including ladies from Marham Bluebirds, RAF Marham Military Wives choir.

== Critical reception ==
Critics reviewed "Sing" positively, with Ross Lydall of the London Evening Standard stating that the song "Titled simply Sing, is required to appeal to the masses across the Commonwealth as well as an 86-year-old monarch. But if anyone can teach the world to sing in perfect harmony it is Barlow, who is well used to writing songs that suit stadiums." He continues by calling the accompanying video "a delight, beginning with Barlow pressing play on a CD in front of Prince Charles – and going on to show him recording singers from Jamaica, Kenya, Australia and the Solomon Islands, as well as our own Military Wives Choir and some Scottish bagpipers. It's so inclusive it even lets Prince Harry have a go, giving a tambourine a bash." He concludes by stating that the song is a refreshingly unstarry work and it's every bit as stirring as you'd expect [and that] there's no doubt even her Majesty will tap a toe. Tim Walker of The Independent referred to the song as a "testament to Barlow's songwriting that having elicited contributions from Australia, Africa, Jamaica, the South Pacific and the House of Windsor – he has managed to produce something that sounds like a Take That track."

== Chart performance ==
"Sing" entered at number 11 on the UK Singles Chart, having sold number 32,460 copies of the single, despite having been released on the Monday rather than the Sunday as is the case with most newly released singles. The song entered the top 60 in Ireland after 4 days on sale. The following week it rose from 53 to 12 in the Irish Singles Chart The following week, the single rose from 11 to number 1 on the UK Singles Chart, selling 142,470 copies and beating "Whistle" by Flo Rida to the top spot, the highest weekly sales for a number one in 2012 until Cheryl Cole's "Call My Name" sold over 153,000 copies a week later. The song became Barlow's first chart-topping single in the UK since his 1997 hit "Love Won't Wait". "Sing"'s sales week-on-week rose by 338.91% in its second week and were the highest weekly sale for a number one for 25 weeks. The song has sold 327,000 copies as of December 2012, becoming the 49th best-selling single of the year and has spent 30 weeks in the UK Singles Chart.

As of November 2020, "Sing" has moved a total of 427,000 units in the United Kingdom.

"Sing" also entered the Netherlands Top 100 at 69 and peaked at 88 in Belgium.

== Charts and certifications ==
=== Weekly charts ===
Chart (2012)	Peak position
Belgium (Ultratip Bubbling Under Flanders)	88
Europe (Euro Digital Songs)	1
Ireland (IRMA)	12
Netherlands (Single Top 100)	69
Scotland Singles (OCC)	2
UK Singles (OCC)	1
UK Airplay (Music Week)	4
UK Singles Downloads (OCC)	1

=== Year-end charts ===
Chart (2012)	Position
UK Singles Chart	60

=== Certifications ===
Region	Certification	Certified units/sales
United Kingdom (BPI)	Gold	400,000^{‡}
^{‡} Sales+streaming figures based on certification alone.

== Cover versions ==
For BBC Children in Need in 2013, 1,624 children sang the song live unison from 10 towns across the UK. The performance started in the studio then cut between the choirs giving each choir around 10-15 seconds on air before cutting to the next one all live in real time, before finishing in the studio. This was the third year the choir had performed since it started in 2011 and continues to be a regular feature on the telethon. The choirs sang from: Elstree at Elstree Studios the studios on the outskirts of London where the main telethon was held, Bath at The Roman Baths, Belfast at BBC Blackstaff House, Manchester at Z-arts, Falmouth at The National Maritime Museum, Glasgow at BBC Pacific Quay, Birmingham at the Library of Birmingham, Kettering at Wicksteed Park, Merthyr Tydfil at Merthyr Tydfil College and Hexham at Hexham Trinity Methodist Church

== Release history ==
Country	Date	Format	Label
Worldwide	28 May 2012	Digital download	Decca Records
