= Forever Love (Gary Barlow song) =

1996 single by Gary Barlow

Single by Gary Barlow

from the album Open Road
- B-side: "I Miss It All"
- Released: 8 July 1996
- Studio: Metropolis (London, England)
- Length: 4:36
- Label: RCA; BMG
- Songwriter: Gary Barlow
- Producers: Gary Barlow; Chris Porter

Gary Barlow singles chronology
"Forever Love" (1996)	"Love Won't Wait" (1997)

"Forever Love" is a song by British singer-songwriter Gary Barlow. It was released as the lead single from his debut solo album, Open Road (1997), on 8 July 1996 by RCA Records and BMG. Barlow's first single outside Take That, "Forever Love" topped the UK Singles Chart as well as the charts of Greece, Lithuania, Spain and Taiwan, and it entered the top five in seven other countries. The song was used as the official theme for the film The Leading Man (1996).

The single's cover was a portrait done by Norman Watson for the April 1996 cover of Arena magazine. This issue became the fastest-selling in the magazine's history and as a result the image was chosen as the debut artwork.

== Critical reception ==
British magazine Music Week rated the song four out of five, writing, "Barlow's undisputed writing skills are evident on this wistful ballad which builds to a dramatic climax. A surefire number one." Editor Alan Jones added, "An introspective ballad, it starts slowly and becomes increasingly urgent and compelling. Aside from Barlow's voice, which is in fine fettle, the song is dominated by piano and is a romantic tour-de-force of the kind his fans must have been hoping for. One of the year's biggest hits."

== Chart performance ==
Selling 109,000 copies during its first week of release, "Forever Love" entered the UK Singles Chart at number one, where it stayed for one week, thus making Barlow the first member of Take That to top the charts with a solo record. It remained in the top 75 for a total of 16 weeks, being certified gold by the British Phonographic Industry (BPI).

== Music video ==
The official music video of "Forever Love" is shot in black and white and begins with Gary Barlow waking up alone and looking out of a window. He is then shown to partake in a number of day-to-day activities and finally ends up in a downtown cafe where he witnesses all types of love that exist between people before returning to his studio.

== Track listing ==
All tracks were written by Gary Barlow.

Standard

1. "Forever Love" – 4:36
2. "I Miss It All" – 4:02
3. "Forever Love" (instrumental) – 4:37

== Credits and personnel ==
Credits are lifted from the UK CD single liner notes and the Open Road album booklet.

Studio

- Recorded and mixed at Metropolis Studios (London, England)

Personnel

- Gary Barlow – writing, piano, production
- Chris Porter – production
- Chris Cameron – piano, bass, strings
- Andy Duncan – drums, percussion
- Steve McNichol – programming
- Rob Cattermole – programming assistance
- Stylorouge – artwork design
- Norman Watson – artwork photography

== Charts ==
=== Weekly charts ===
Chart (1996)	Peak position
Australia (ARIA)	7
Austria (Ö3 Austria Top 40)	11
Belgium (Ultratop 50 Flanders)	5
Belgium (Ultratop 50 Wallonia)	4
Czech Republic (IFPI CR)	3
Denmark (IFPI)	3
Estonia (Eesti Top 20)	20
Europe (Eurochart Hot 100)	3
Europe (European AC Radio)	2
Europe (European Hit Radio)	2
Europe Channel Crossovers (Music & Media)	1
Finland (Suomen virallinen lista)	6
France (SNEP)	27
France Airplay (SNEP)	39
Germany (GfK)	5
Greece (IFPI Greece)	1
Hungary (Mahasz)	6
Iceland (Íslenski Listinn Topp 40)	38
Ireland (IRMA)	3
Israel (Israeli Singles Chart)	3
Italy (Musica e dischi)	8
Italy Airplay (Music & Media)	7
Japan International (Oricon)	8
Latvia (Latvijas Top 40)	8
Lithuania (M-1)	1
Netherlands (Dutch Top 40)	7
Netherlands (Single Top 100)	6
Norway (VG-lista)	9
Scottish Singles Sales (Official Charts)	2
Spain (AFYVE)	1
Spain Airplay (Top 40 Radio)	5
Sweden (Sverigetopplistan)	12
Switzerland (Schweizer Hitparade)	5
Taiwan (IFPI)	1
UK Singles (Official Charts)	1
UK Airplay (Music Week)	1

=== Year-end charts ===
Chart (1996)	Position
Belgium (Ultratop 50 Flanders)	43
Belgium (Ultratop 50 Wallonia)	36
Europe (Eurochart Hot 100)	45
Europe (European Hit Radio)	18
Europe (Channel Crossovers)	8
Germany (Media Control)	56
Italy (Musica e dischi)	54
Latvia (Latvijas Top 50)	46
Netherlands (Dutch Top 40)	73
Netherlands (Single Top 100)	78
Sweden (Topplistan)	62
Switzerland (Schweizer Hitparade)	14
UK Singles (OCC)	40

== Certifications ==
Region	Certification	Certified units/sales
United Kingdom (BPI)	Gold	400,000^{^}
^{^} Shipments figures based on certification alone.

== Release history ==
Region	Date	Format(s)	Label(s)	Ref.
United Kingdom	8 July 1996	CD; cassette	RCA; BMG	
Japan	7 August 1996	CD	RCA; BMG	
