= Shame (Robbie Williams and Gary Barlow song) =

2010 single by Robbie Williams and Gary Barlow

Single by Robbie Williams and Gary Barlow

from the album In and Out of Consciousness: Greatest Hits 1990–2010
- B-side: "The Queen"
- Released: 27 August 2010
- Recorded: 2010
- Studio: Metropolis Studios, London; Gateway Mastering, Portland
- Genre: Acoustic; folk pop
- Length: 3:59
- Label: Virgin
- Songwriters: Gary Barlow, Robbie Williams
- Producer: Trevor Horn

Robbie Williams singles chronology
"Morning Sun" (2010)	"Shame" (2010)	"Candy" (2012)

Gary Barlow singles chronology
"Lie to Me" (1999)	"Shame" (2010)	"Sing" (2012)

Music video
- "Shame" on YouTube

"Shame" is a song written and recorded by English singers Robbie Williams and Gary Barlow for Williams's second greatest hits compilation album, In and Out of Consciousness: Greatest Hits 1990–2010 (2010). Produced by Trevor Horn, it was released as the lead single from the album on 27 August 2010 in most countries worldwide and on 1 October in the United Kingdom. "Shame" marks the first time Williams and Barlow collaborated on a song together solely and the first time they worked together since Williams left Take That in 1995. It is a pop song with country and folk music influences; two reviewers noted that it contains an acoustic guitar part similar to that of the Beatles' 1968 song, "Blackbird". The lyrical content revolves around the singers repairing their broken relationship.

"Shame" received generally favourable reviews from music critics who praised the song's sound, melody, and lyrical skills of the performers. It reached the top-ten in seven countries worldwide including Hungary, Netherlands, Italy and Denmark. In the singers' native United Kingdom, it peaked at number two on the singles chart and was certified silver by the British Phonographic Industry (BPI), denoting shipments of over 200,000 copies in the country. The accompanying music video for the song was directed by Vaughan Arnell in Los Angeles and premiered on 26 August 2010. It features Williams and Barlow dancing and singing the song in a bar and fishing on a pond. Multiple critics linked the storyline and the pair's chemistry in the video to the 2005 film, Brokeback Mountain. To further promote "Shame", the pair performed it on multiple occasions including on the Help for Heroes concert and Strictly Come Dancing.

== Development and release ==
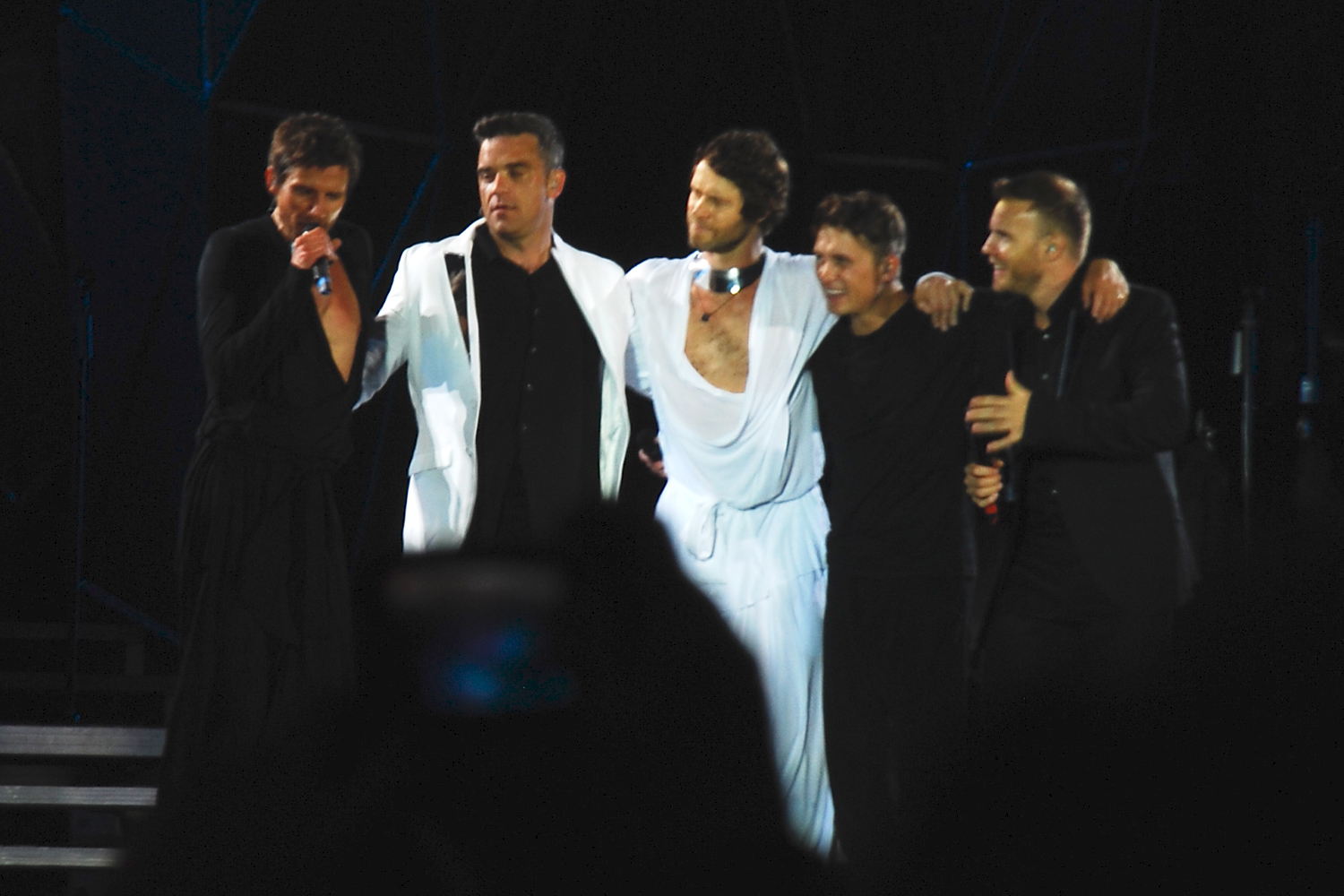
Although Take That reunited in 2005, Williams didn't join them until 2010, before leaving again

In July 1995, Williams announced that he was leaving Take That, a boy band in which both he and Barlow were members. Following Williams's departure, the group disbanded until 2005 when Take That announced their reunion. In 2008, during the band's work on their fifth studio album, The Circus, Barlow and Williams met for the second time since the band reformed. In 2010, in an interview on BBC Radio 1, Williams elaborated, "'It is one of those situations in life that could be very explosive and could go completely wrong. We had that big chat and the most amazing thing happened at the end of it. We both said sorry to each other and we both meant it and that was all we needed." Barlow added, "I spent the last 15 years thinking about what I was going to say."

"Shame" was written by Barlow and Williams for Williams's second greatest hits album, In and Out of Consciousness: Greatest Hits 1990–2010 (2010). In February 2010, the single was composed and written in an hour, in an empty recording studio located in Los Angeles; it was inspired by their past troubled relationship. English musician Trevor Horn produced "Shame" whilst Tim Weidner and Graham Archer did the engineering of the track; Dave Miles served as an additional engineer. Weidner also provided the mixing of the song. All of its mastering was done at the Metropolis Studios in London and the Gateway Mastering in Portland, Maine.

"Shame" was released as the lead and only single from In and Out of Consciousness: Greatest Hits 1990–2010. It was made available for digital download via the iTunes Store on 27 August 2010 in some countries, including Australia, Denmark, Germany and Italy. In singers's native United Kingdom it was placed for digital purchase over a month later on 1 October. On 4 October, Virgin Records released a CD single of "Shame" in the UK; apart from the title track, the single featured another song performed by Williams, titled "The Queen".

== Composition and lyrical interpretation ==
'Shame'
A sample of "Shame", a pop song with country and electro music influences that features a lyrical content revolving around singers's broken relationship and fixing things up.

"Shame" is a pop song with a length of three minutes fifty-nine seconds. According to Faber Music's digital sheet music for the song, "Shame" is composed in the key of Bb major and set in common time signature, and has a moderately slow groove of 96 beats per minute. The singers's vocals span from the low note of B_{3} to the high note of B_{5}. Michael Cragg of The Guardian noted that the single features country music influences and an "electro-tinged" chorus, reminiscent of the works of British producer Stuart Price. Digital Spy's Mayer Nissim noted that "Shame" contains an acoustic guitar part which is similar to the one of "Blackbird", a 1968 song written by Paul McCartney and performed by The Beatles.

The lyrical content of "Shame" revolves around "the breakdown in the relationship" that Williams and Barlow experienced after the former left Take That. Williams starts the song with the line, "Well there's three versions of this story / Mine and yours and then the truth", whilst Barlow responds channelling his original attempt for reconciliation, "I read your mind and tried to call / My tears could fill the Albert Hall." Stuff.co.nz commented that the lines, "I don't recall the reasons why, I must have meant them at the time, is this the sound of sweet surrender?" were the two "patch[ing] things up" and a "happy ending".

== Critical reception ==
"Shame" received generally favourable reviews from contemporary music critics. Nissim gave the song three out of five stars and wrote that although it is not as good as Take That's previous singles, "Patience", "Back for Good" and "Pray", "it sounds awfully sweet and, more importantly, absolutely genuine." Sean Egan of BBC Music stated that the single, "is as good as it sounds on paper, Barlow's sumptuous melodic skills allied to a lyrical prowess we never suspected Williams had in the Take That days as the two engage in a sweetly regretful dialogue with each other about their past feuds." A reviewer for CBBC described it as a "really sweet" and "meaningful" song that has "cheeky" sense of humour and words that can make the listener happy. USA Today's Jerry Shriver noted that "Shame" confirms Williams as a "former boy wonder" who "is in no danger of losing his mojo". Katie Boucher of The National called the single "a bouncy reconciliatory duet" with a sound more similar to Take That, rather than Williams's solo material.

In a less enthusiastic review, Scott Causer of Contactmusic.com stated, "the song is a cheesy paean to their past. To their credit they don't pretend it's anything other than that." MusicOMH's Nic Oliver called the collaboration "wooden musically", but noted that Williams succeeds to "turn in wry, self-deprecating lyric that bodes well for his mature years".

== Commercial performance ==
On 10 October 2010, "Shame" debuted and peaked at number two on the UK Singles Chart and the Scottish Singles Chart with over 107,000 copies sold for the week. Two weeks prior, the song peaked at number one on the UK Airplay Chart. It was certified silver by the British Phonographic Industry (BPI), denoting shipments of over 200,000 copies in the country alone. On the Irish Singles Chart, the single debuted and peaked at number eight on 7 October. In Italy, the song debuted and peaked at number seven on singles chart; the next week it fell to number eight. The Italian Music Industry Federation (FIMI) certified the song gold for sales of over 15,000 copies in the country. "Shame" was most successful in Hungary where it peaked at number one on the Rádio Top 100 chart. In Netherlands, the song debuted at number 17 on the Dutch Singles 100 on 4 September; after seven weeks fluctuating the chart it peaked at number four on 16 October. It debuted at number 15 on the Danish Singles Chart on 10 September, before peaking at number nine the next week. It also peaked at number nine in Israel.

On 15 October, "Shame" debuted and peaked at number 11 on the German Singles Chart. On the Belgian Charts the single peaked at number 19 on the Wallonia chart and number 21 on the Flanders chart. On the Swiss Singles Chart, the song debuted at number 23 on 19 September. After three weeks, it peaked at number 19. The performance of the song was also similar in Austria, where it debuted and peaked at number 20. It failed to make a significant impact on the Australian Singles Chart and only peaked at number 62 for one week. "Shame" was least successful in Slovakia and Japan where it peaked at number 65 and number 91 respectively.

== Music video ==
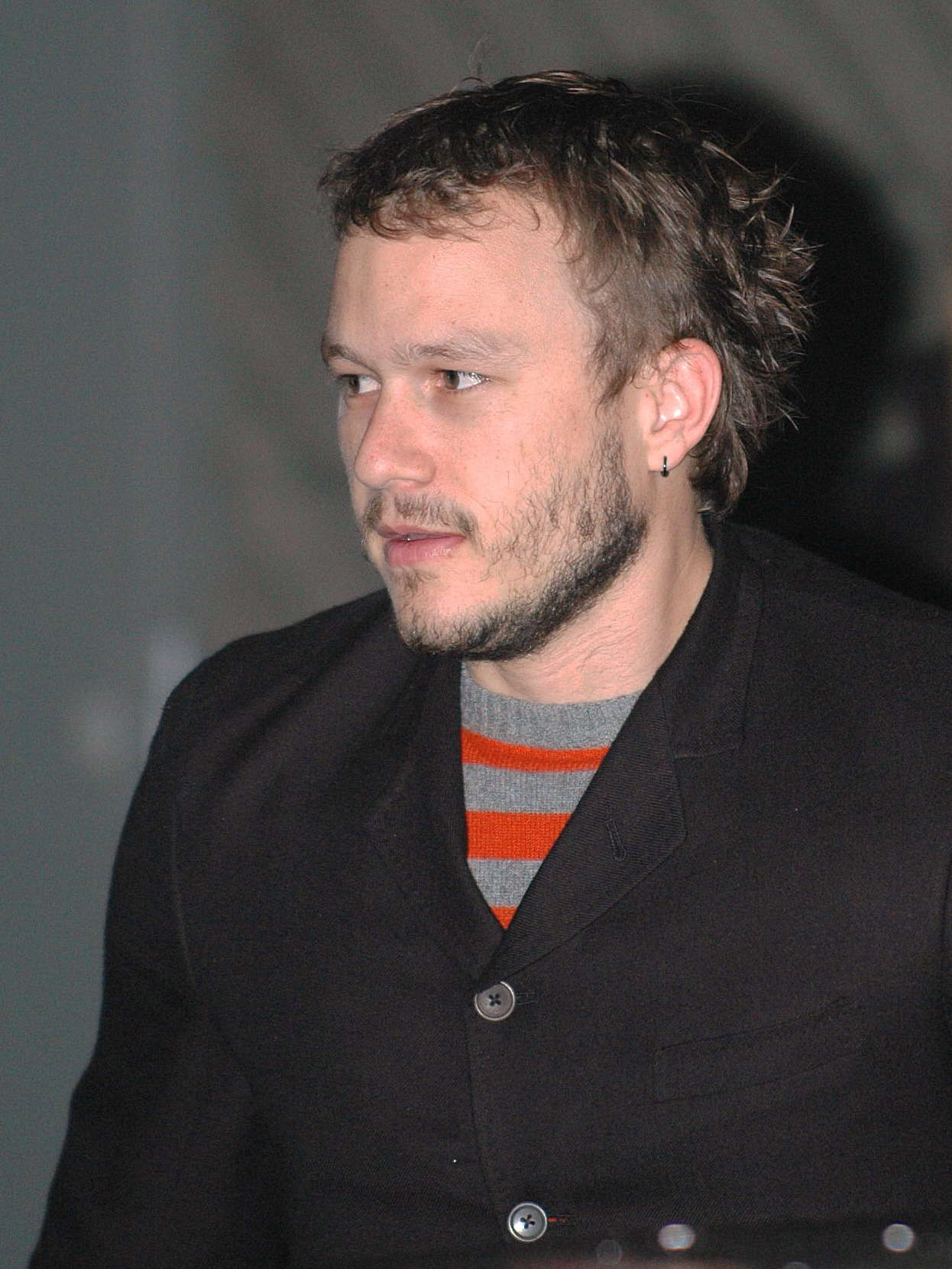
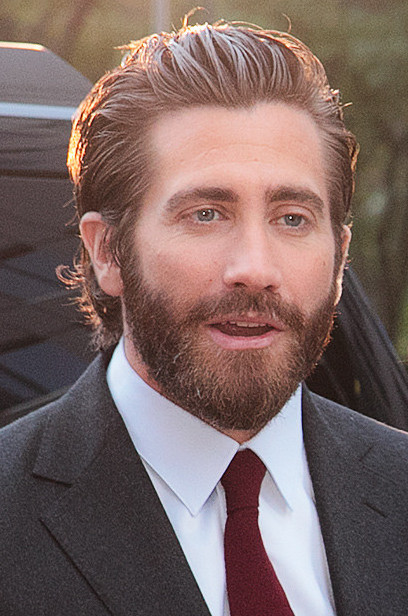
The performance of Williams and Barlow in the video was heavily compared to the roles of actors Heath Ledger (left) and Jake Gyllenhaal (right) in the 2005 film, Brokeback Mountain.

The music video for "Shame" was directed by Vaughan Arnell. It was shot on 21 and 22 February 2010 in Los Angeles, whilst the scenes in the mountains were done in Malibu. It premiered on 26 August 2010 on Williams's official website and on YouTube. On 1 October 2010, it was made available for digital download via the iTunes Store.

The video begins with Williams waiting for his laundry to be done in a store, before getting out for a walk. Meanwhile, Barlow is standing on the other side of the street. As the song starts the two of them start walking towards their cars whilst looking at each other. When they get inside, the scenes are intercut with the two of them dancing with their female partners. Later in the video, they are shown sitting at a bar having a drink whilst singing the lyrics. As the second chorus starts, Williams and Barlow are at a pond, fishing and laughing. Scenes of them looking at each other secretly are also shown. In the middle of the bridge they start taking their shirts off. Shortly, they are shown climbing up a cliff. After they get to the top they want to jump, however, they realise it is too high and instead hug each other and walk away.

Critics heavily compared the storyline of the music video to that of the 2005 film, Brokeback Mountain. Birmingham Mail's Luke Beardsworth described it as a "lighthearted parody" of the film and according to him the visual depicts Williams and Barlow as young cowboys who are in love secretly. Cragg noted that the video features "the two men gaze lovingly into each other's eyes, strip to the waist and fall in love all over again."

== Live performances ==
Williams and Barlow performed "Shame" for the first time on 12 September 2010 at the Help for Heroes concert held in London. On 2 October the duo sang the song at the series eight of the Strictly Come Dancing. A Metro newspaper critic reviewed the performance and wrote, "the pair, wearing matching black suits, spent much of the early stages of their performance sitting on stools and gazing into each other’s eyes as they sung the duet." On 7 October, Williams and Barlow appeared on BBC Radio 1 where they gave a performance of the song. The singers were guests at the Paul O'Grady Live chat show and also performed the single on 8 October. Three days after, on 11 October, they gave a rendition of the track on the morning television programme, Daybreak. On 18 November the pair performed the song on the German reality TV programme, Popstars: Girls forever. Barlow included "Shame" on the set list of his 2014 tour, Since I Saw You Last, where he performed a solo acoustic version of the song.

== Formats and track listing ==
- Digital download
1. "Shame" – 3:59
- CD single
1. "Shame" – 3:59
2. "The Queen" – 3:21

== Credits and personnel ==
Credits adapted from the liner notes of In and Out of Consciousness: Greatest Hits 1990–2010. Locations

- Mastering at Metropolis Studios, London; Gateway Mastering, Portland, Maine

Personnel

- Robbie Williams – vocals, writing
- Gary Barlow – vocals, writing
- Trevor Horn – production
- Graham Archer – engineering
- Tim Weidner – engineering, mixing
- Dave Miles – additional engineering

== Charts ==
=== Weekly charts ===
Weekly chart performance for "Shame"
Chart (2010)	Peak position
Australia (ARIA)	62
Austria (Ö3 Austria Top 40)	20
Belgium (Ultratop 50 Flanders)	21
Belgian Airplay (Ultratop Flanders)	4
Belgium (Ultratop 50 Wallonia)	19
Belgian Airplay (Ultratop Wallonia)	14
CIS Airplay (TopHit)	142
Czech Republic Airplay (ČNS IFPI)	40
Denmark (Tracklisten)	9
Denmark Airplay (Tracklisten)	12
Europe (Eurochart Hot 100)	4
Europe (European Hit Radio)	13
Finland Airplay (Radiosoittolista)	8
France Airplay (SNEP)	35
Germany (GfK)	11
Hungary (Rádiós Top 40)	1
Ireland (IRMA)	8
Israel International Airplay (Media Forest)	9
Italy (FIMI)	7
Italy (Musica e dischi)	2
Japan (Japan Hot 100)	91
Latvia (Latvijas Top 40)	32
Mexico Ingles Airplay (Billboard)	9
Netherlands (Dutch Top 40)	10
Netherlands (Single Top 100)	4
Scottish Singles Sales (Official Charts)	2
Slovakia Airplay (ČNS IFPI)	65
Spain (Promusicae)	28
Sweden (Sverigetopplistan)	24
Switzerland (Schweizer Hitparade)	19
Switzerland Airplay (Swiss Hitparade)	6
UK Singles (Official Charts)	2
UK Airplay (Music Week)	1

=== Year-end charts ===
Year-end chart performance for "Shame"
Chart (2010)	Position
Germany (Official German Charts)	82
Hungary (Rádiós Top 40)	36
Italy (FIMI)	82
Italy (Musica e dischi)	73
Italy Airplay (EarOne)	54
Netherlands (Dutch Top 40)	56
Netherlands (Single Top 100)	68
UK Singles (OCC)	118
UK Airplay (Music Week)	58

== Certifications ==
Certifications for "Shame"
Region	Certification	Certified units/sales
Italy (FIMI)	Gold	15,000^{*}
United Kingdom (BPI)	Silver	200,000^{^}
^{*} Sales figures based on certification alone.^{^} Shipments figures based on certification alone.

== Release history ==
Release history and formats for "Shame"
Country	Date	Format	Label
Australia	27 August 2010	Digital download	Virgin
Austria	27 August 2010	Digital download	Virgin
Denmark	27 August 2010	Digital download	Virgin
Germany	27 August 2010	Digital download	Virgin
Italy	27 August 2010	Digital download	Virgin
Netherlands	27 August 2010	Digital download	Virgin
New Zealand	27 August 2010	Digital download	Virgin
United Kingdom	1 October 2010	Digital download	Virgin
United Kingdom	4 October 2010	CD single	Virgin
