= Twelve Months, Eleven Days =

Studio album by Gary Barlow
- Released: 11 October 1999
- Recorded: 1998–1999
- Genre: Pop
- Length: 54:04
- Label: BMG, RCA
- Producer: Gary Barlow; Kristian Lundin; Max Martin; Jon Douglas; Grant Mitchell; Brian Rawling; Mark Taylor; Cutfather & Joe; Dufflebag Boys

Gary Barlow chronology
Open Road (1997)	Twelve Months, Eleven Days (1999)	Sing (2012)

Singles from Twelve Months, Eleven Days
- 1. "Stronger" Released: 5 July 1999; 2. "For All That You Want" Released: 27 September 1999

Professional ratings
Review scores
Source	Rating
AllMusic	3/5 stars

Twelve Months, Eleven Days is the second solo studio album released by British singer-songwriter Gary Barlow. The album was released by BMG and RCA Records on 11 October 1999. It was to be Barlow's last studio album for 13 years until the release of Sing. Furthermore, this was his last full-length record up until the release of Since I Saw You Last.

== Background ==
Following the success of Barlow's debut album Open Road, expectations were high for his second solo album. However, when the album's lead single, "Stronger", a dance ballad, was released on 5 July 1999, many fans were unsure of Barlow's change in direction, and the single only peaked at number 16 on the UK Singles Chart. At the time, the British press had been ridiculing Barlow for not providing the media the headlines that they craved about his private life, and that his ex-bandmate, Robbie Williams, had regularly been in the papers with his erratic behaviour and party lifestyle. In an attempt to create a hype for the album, Barlow released "For All That You Want" as the album's second single, which entered and peaked at number 24 on the UK Singles Chart.

== Release ==
When the album was released on 11 October 1999 it debuted at number 35 on the UK Albums Chart, and after two weeks, fell out of the top 100. It also debuted at number 19 in Ireland and number 67 in Germany before falling out of both charts the following week. This was believed to be down to poor promotion and little airplay, and the fact that he had been targeted by the press and Williams, with him citing that his departure from Take That was due to Barlow. "Lie to Me" was intended to be released as the album's third single; however, after music differences and arguments between Barlow and RCA over their involvement in his long-term career, the single was cancelled. Barlow later referred to "Lie to Me" as the best song on the album.

== Reception ==
Jon O'Brien of AllMusic gave the album 3 stars out of 5 stating positively that "comeback single "Stronger" was an infectious slice of Enrique Iglesias-style Latin dance-pop, co-penned with the team behind Cher's "Believe"; [whilst] the funky "Fast Love"-esque "Wondering" shows he is capable of pulling off the George Michael uptempos as well as the heartfelt ballads; and "Walk" was a surprisingly accomplished stab at slick new jack swing-inspired R&B -- all proving that Barlow hadn't lost his ability to write infectious melodies overnight." However, he went on to say that for the album to have been a success when being "released in the midst of Robbie Williams' chart domination, Barlow needed to have recorded something with a little more substance than the watered-down pop of Open Road if he was to have any chance of competing with his virtually untouchable former bandmate, something that its lowly number 35 chart position seemed to firmly confirm he failed to do." O'Brien concluded his review positively stating that the "largely forgotten swan song to a glittering career, in the wake of Take That's triumphant revival Twelve Months, Eleven Days has witnessed something of a reassessment. And while there's nothing here that would appear on a Gary Barlow greatest-hits collection, it's certainly not the car crash that its dismal sales suggest."

== Track listing ==
All tracks written by Gary Barlow, except where noted.

No.	Title	Writer(s)	Producer(s)	Length
1.	"For All That You Want"	Gary Barlow, Max Martin, Kristian Lundin	Martin, Lundin	3:36
2.	"Arms Around Me"	Barlow, Peter Vettese	Dufflebag Boys	3:50
3.	"Lie to Me"		Jon Douglas	5:30
4.	"Fast Car"		Douglas	4:45
5.	"Stronger"	Barlow, Graham Gouldman	Douglas, Brian Rawling^{[a]}, Mark Taylor^{[a]}	3:40
6.	"All That I've Given Away"		Barlow	4:30
7.	"Wondering"		Grant Mitchell, Douglas^{[b]}	3:43
8.	"Don't Need a Reason"		Mitchell	4:35
9.	"Before You Turn Away"		Douglas	3:18
10.	"Walk"		Cutfather & Joe	5:20
11.	"Nothing Feels the Same"		Douglas	4:05
12.	"Yesterday's Girl"		Barlow	6:54

Limited edition bonus CD-rom tracks
No.	Title	Length
13.	"For All That You Want" (Video)	3:33
14.	"Stronger" (Video)	3:39

Japanese edition bonus tracks
No.	Title	Length
13.	"Stronger" (Metro extended)	7:01
14.	"Stronger" (Mark's inbetween vocal)	9:50
15.	"DMC Megamix"	7:36

Notes

- ^{^[a]} signifies an additional producer
- ^{^[b]} signifies a remixer

== Personnel ==
- Gary Barlow – vocals, backing vocals (2–6, 11, 12), keyboards (3, 6), programming (6), Rhodes piano (10)
- Dave Clews – keyboard programming (3, 4, 5, 9), keyboards (4)
- Joe Belmaati – keyboards (10), programming (10)
- Esbjörn Öhrwall – guitars (1)
- Paul Gendler – guitars (2)
- Alan Ross – guitars (3, 4, 5, 9)
- Juan Ramirez – flamenco guitar (5)
- Phil Palmer – guitars (6, 12)
- Adam Drake – guitars (7, 8, 11)
- Jonas Krag – guitars (10)
- Milton McDonald – guitars (12)
- Paul Turner – bass guitar (4, 7, 9, 11, 12)
- Chris Dagley – drums (3, 12)
- Jon Douglas – drum programming (3, 4, 9)
- Andy Duncan – percussion (12)
- Nigel Hitchcock – tenor saxophone (7)
- Neil Sidwell – trombone (7)
- Steve Sidwell – trumpet (7)
- Paul Spong – trumpet (7)
- Steáfán Hannigan – Irish pipes (12)
- Dufflebag Boys – arrangements (2)
- Ben Foster – string conductor and scoring (2)
- The Millennia Strings – strings (2)
- Wil Malone – string arrangements (3)
- Chris Cameron – string arrangements (6, 12), keyboards (12)
- James Shearman – string arrangements (7, 8)
- Henrik Janson – string arrangements (10)
- Ulf Jansson – string arrangements (10)
- Nick Griffiths – string arrangements (11)
- Isobel Griffiths – orchestra contractor (6, 7, 8, 11, 12)
- The London Session Orchestra – orchestra (3)
- Snyko Orchestra – orchestra (10)
- Max Martin – backing vocals (1)
- Andreas Carlsson – backing vocals (1)
- Nana Hedin – backing vocals (1)
- Dawn Topham – backing vocals (2)
- Lucie Silverman – backing vocals (3)
- Andy Caine – backing vocals (4, 11)
- Rebekah Ryan – backing vocals (5)
- Tracy Ackerman – backing vocals (6)
- Miriam Stockley – backing vocals (6)
- Lain Gray – backing vocals (7, 8)
- Lawrence Johnson – backing vocals (7), vocal arrangements (7, 8)
- Priscilla Mae-Jones – backing vocals (7, 8)
- Marlon Powell – backing vocals (7)
- Patricia Scott – backing vocals (7)
- Susanne Carstensen – backing vocals (10)
- Tim Willis – engineer (1), mixing (1)
- Dean Murphy – engineer (2)
- Bob Kraushaar – mixing (2)
- Ren Swan – engineer (3, 4, 5, 7, 8, 9, 11, 12), recording (6)
- Leigh Jemison – engineer (4)
- Brian Rawling – remixing (5)
- Mark Taylor – remixing (5)
- Steve Fitzmaurice – mix engineer (6)
- Jon Douglas – remixing (7)
- Joe Belmaati – recording (10)
- Mads Nilsson – mixing (10)
- Dale Markey – assistant engineer
- Ram & Fab – photography

== Charts ==
Chart performance for Twelve Months, Eleven Days
Chart (1999)	Peak position
German Albums (Offizielle Top 100)	67
Irish Albums (IRMA)	19
Scottish Albums (OCC)	81
UK Albums (OCC)	35
