= For All That You Want =

Single by Gary Barlow

from the album Twelve Months, Eleven Days
- B-side: "Say It"; "The Only One"; "Part of My Life"
- Released: 27 September 1999
- Genre: Pop
- Length: 3:37
- Label: BMG, RCA
- Songwriters: Gary Barlow, Max Martin, Kristian Lundin
- Producers: Max Martin, Kristian Lundin

Gary Barlow singles chronology
"Stronger" (1999)	"For All That You Want" (1999)	"Lie to Me" (1999)

"For All That You Want" is the second single from British singer/songwriter Gary Barlow's second studio album, Twelve Months, Eleven Days. The single was released on 27 September 1999. In 2003, footage of the music video was used in an Alton Towers advert, showing Barlow and his friends driving bumper cars.

== Song information ==
"For All That You Want" became Barlow's final official release under Sony BMG. The following release, Lie to Me, was originally due to be released as the second single, but was pushed back due to work on the track being incomplete. "For All That You Want" was first recorded in 1997, and released in the United States under the title "Superhero". It was Barlow's second American release, failing to crack the American Market. "Superhero" appeared on Barlow's debut album in the States. "For All That You Want" is a basic re-write of "Superhero", albeit with a few different lyrics and a slightly slower beat.

== Music video ==
The music video was revealed in September 1999 and features Barlow and friends going to an amusement park and going on the rides. The music video was filmed on location at Tottenham house in Savernake Forest and was aided in its filming by residents at the house, Darren Shepherd, Alan Nelson and Janna King. It finishes with Barlow and friends on the roof of the 18th century mansion house. A copy of the original production video was sent in appreciation to Martin Lawrence Manager of Tottenham House for his daughter Charlotte

== Track listings ==
UK CD Single #1

1. "For All That You Want" (Barlow, Martin, Lundin) - 3:37
2. "Say It" (Barlow) - 3:23
3. "Part Of My Life" (Barlow) - 4:36

UK CD Single #2

1. "For All That You Want" (Barlow, Martin, Lundin) - 3:37
2. "The Only One" (Barlow) - 4:17
3. "For All That You Want" (Video) - 3:37

UK Cassette Single

1. "For All That You Want" (Barlow, Martin, Lundin) - 3:37
2. "Say It" (Barlow) - 3:23

== Charts ==
Chart (1999)	Peak position
Europe (Eurochart Hot 100)	74
Finland (Suomen virallinen lista)	6
Finland Airplay (Radiosoittolista)	14
Germany (Media Control)	94
Scottish Singles Sales (Official Charts)	36
UK Singles (OCC)	24
UK Airplay (Music Week)	32
