= Love Won't Wait =

1997 single by Gary Barlow

Single by Gary Barlow

from the album Open Road
- B-side: "Cuddly Toy"
- Released: 9 April 1997
- Genre: Dance-pop
- Length: 4:17
- Label: BMG; RCA
- Songwriters: Madonna; Shep Pettibone
- Producer: Stephen Lipson

Gary Barlow singles chronology
| "Forever Love" (1996) | "Love Won't Wait" (1997) | "So Help Me Girl" (1997) |

"Love Won't Wait" is a song by English singer Gary Barlow from his debut studio album, Open Road (1997). It was released as the second single from the album on 9 April 1997 by BMG and RCA Records. The song was written by Madonna and Shep Pettibone, and was an unreleased demo from her Bedtime Stories (1994) studio sessions. Barlow came by the demo in 1997, while looking to record more songs for Open Road. He recorded the track with Stephen Lipson as producer.

Barlow was apprehensive about releasing the track, but due to contractual obligations he had to release it. The song became Barlow's second consecutive number-one release on the UK Singles Chart, following "Forever Love", and was certified silver by the British Phonographic Industry (BPI). It also reached number one in Spain, and the top ten in Denmark, Ireland, Italy and Taiwan. A music video for the song was directed by Rocky Schenck and showed Barlow singing "Love Won't Wait" across different locations. He also performed the song at the 1997 pre-Grammy Award party, where his performance was negatively received.

Madonna's version of the song was officially released on 21 November 2025 as a promotional single for her EP Bedtime Stories: The Untold Chapter (2025).

== Background ==
Following the release of her fifth studio album, Erotica (1992), Madonna and her producer Shep Pettibone continued writing more songs in the same vein as present in the album. However, she later abandoned the project and collaborated with record producers Dallas Austin and Nellee Hooper to create Bedtime Stories, her sixth studio album, released in 1994. Many of the songs from the writing sessions with Pettibone were not included and remained as demos. Madonna's demo would later be leaked online and then included on the 2025 release Bedtime Stories:The Untold Chapter. In the meantime, Gary Barlow wanted to release his debut album, Open Road, to coincide with his first single, "Forever Love". However, he wanted to continue recording songs for the album. He came across one of Madonna's demos called "Love Won't Wait" and decided to record it, after shortening the lyrics.

Barlow's manager, Simon Fuller, chose Stephen Lipson to produce the song, seeing his success with 1980s artists like Grace Jones and Frankie Goes to Hollywood. Although the song did not sound like what Barlow would usually record, he nevertheless explained in an interview: "It took me a while to get my interpretation right because Madonna had written from a female point of view. It's not the kind of song I would write myself. But as soon as I heard it, I thought 'This is a hit'." A dance-pop song, "Love Won't Wait" is set in the time signature of common time with a tempo of 120 beats per minute. Barlow's voice spans between the nodes of C♯m and A_{3} and has a basic chord progression of C–A–B–C♯m in the pre-chorus and E–B–D–A–C–E–A–C♯m in the chorus.

== Release and promotion ==
Barlow had arrived in the United States in February 1997 for recording the track, where Clive Davis, who was managing his career in the United States, played him a "poppier" version of the song, remixed by Junior Vasquez. He also requested Barlow to perform "Love Won't Wait" at the 1997 pre-Grammy Award party. However, the singer did not have any time to rehearse or memorize the lyrics, resulting in the performance receiving negative reviews from critics and audience alike. With The Times Barlow recounted the evening saying, "I don't remember the words. I came in at all the wrong times. I can see people drifting off to the toilet in droves. Talk about dying on your arse!" The combination of the negative review towards his performance and contractual obligations led to Barlow release "Love Won't Wait" as his second single on 9 April 1997 in Japan and on 24 April 1997 in the United Kingdom. The CD single consists of the single version along with the Vasquez remix and two other tracks from Open Road, "Meaning Of A Love Song" and "Always". Another song, "Cuddly Toy", was released on the B-side of another CD single for the song, released in May 1997.

An accompanying music video was directed by Rocky Schenck and was released on 28 April 1997. It features Barlow performing the song in France, walking down a highway littered with stage props and crew members actively changing the scenes as he walks forward. As he performs the chorus, he jumps off the set and walks towards his stage chair, where he sits and observes his surroundings. The video ends with Barlow running away from a woman down a country road, as the video fades from view.

== Critical and commercial reception ==
While the album received mostly negative reviews, songs like "Love Won't Wait" were considered a stand-out by The Times. The Daily Mirror noted it as a "classic track you've known all your life". A reviewer from Music Week rated it four out of five, adding, "There's something vaguely reminiscent of those cheesy Seventies pop tunes about this Shep Pettibone-penned taster for Barlow's debut solo album. It's a killer all the same and the ex-Take That crowd will lap it up." The magazine's Alan Jones commented, "The Madonna-penned track sounds like an inferior Cliff Richard record, with Barlow making a bizarrely accurate facsimile of Sir Cliff's falsetto. None of which will prevent it from being a big hit, of course." The Sunday Mirror gave it seven out of ten, and cautioned that "Take That fans will lap up another smooth one from Gary, but I can't help thinking he's trying to turn into Elton John far too soon."

In the United Kingdom, "Love Won't Wait" became Barlow's second solo number one single on the UK Singles Chart, following "Forever Love". It was number one for one week, and was present for a total of nine weeks within the top 100 of the chart. The British Phonographic Industry (BPI) certified it silver, for shipment of 200,000 copies of the single. The song also reached number one in Spain, and the top-ten of the charts in Denmark, Ireland and Taiwan. In Australia, "Love Won't Wait" peaked at number 16 on the ARIA Singles Chart.

== Track listing and formats ==
- UK CD1
1. "Love Won't Wait" (radio edit) – 4:18
2. "Love Won't Wait" (Junior Vasquez mix) – 4:25
3. "Meaning of a Love Song" – 3:37
4. "Always" – 3:31
- UK CD2
1. "Love Won't Wait" (radio edit) – 4:18
2. "Cuddly Toy" (Lush vocal radio edit) – 3:44
3. "Cuddly Toy" (Full On Retro vocal) – 8:51
4. "Cuddly Toy" (Dumb & Funky dub) – 7:45
- UK cassette single
1. "Love Won't Wait" (radio edit) – 4:18
2. "Always" – 3:31
- Japanese CD single
1. "Love Won't Wait"
2. "Always"
3. "Meaning of a Love Song"

== Charts ==
=== Weekly charts ===
Weekly chart performance for "Love Won't Wait"
| Chart (1997) | Peak position |
|---|---|
| Australia (ARIA) | 16 |
| Austria (Ö3 Austria Top 40) | 20 |
| Belgium (Ultratop 50 Flanders) | 43 |
| Denmark (Tracklisten) | 7 |
| Estonia (Eesti Top 20) | 4 |
| Estonia Airplay (Eesti Top 15) | 6 |
| Europe (Eurochart Hot 100) | 15 |
| Europe (European Hit Radio) | 2 |
| Finland (Suomen virallinen lista) | 16 |
| France Airplay (SNEP) | 76 |
| Germany (GfK) | 35 |
| Greece (IFPI Greece) | 5 |
| Hungary (Mahasz) | 7 |
| Iceland (Íslenski Listinn Topp 40) | 35 |
| Ireland (IRMA) | 5 |
| Israel (Israeli Singles Chart) | 5 |
| Italy (FIMI) | 4 |
| Italy Airplay (Music & Media) | 5 |
| Netherlands (Dutch Top 40) | 21 |
| Netherlands (Single Top 100) | 32 |
| New Zealand (Recorded Music NZ) | 42 |
| Poland Airplay (Music & Media) | 14 |
| Scottish Singles Sales (Official Charts) | 3 |
| Spain (AFYVE) | 1 |
| Spain Airplay (Top 40 Radio) | 7 |
| Sweden (Sverigetopplistan) | 53 |
| Switzerland (Schweizer Hitparade) | 23 |
| Taiwan (IFPI) | 2 |
| UK Singles (Official Charts) | 1 |
| UK Airplay (Music Week) | 6 |

=== Year-end charts ===
Year-end chart performance for "Love Won't Wait"
| Chart (1997) | Position |
|---|---|
| Europe (European Hit Radio) | 44 |
| Italy (Musica e dischi) | 79 |
| UK Singles (OCC) | 65 |

== Certifications ==
Certifications and sales for "Love Won't Wait"
| Region | Certification | Certified units/sales |
|---|---|---|
| United Kingdom (BPI) | Silver | 200,000^{^} |
^{^} Shipments figures based on certification alone.

== Madonna version ==
"Love Won't Wait"

Promotional single by Madonna

from the EP Bedtime Stories: The Untold Chapter
- Released: 21 November 2025
- Length: 4:53
- Label: Warner
- Songwriters: Madonna; Shep Pettibone
- Producer: Shep Pettibone

Madonna's version of "Love Won't Wait" was released on 21 November 2025 as part of the promotional campaign for her extended play Bedtime Stories: The Untold Chapter, in commemoration of the thirtieth anniversary of the album the song was written for. The EP was released a week later on 28 November. Upon release, the song topped the iTunes charts in the UK.

=== Charts ===
Weekly chart performances for "Love Won't Wait"
| Chart (2025) | Peak position |
|---|---|
| UK Singles Downloads (Official Charts) | 44 |

== See also ==
- List of UK Singles Chart number ones of the 1990s
- List of number-one singles of 1997 (Spain)
