= Open Road (Gary Barlow album) =

Studio album by Gary Barlow
- Released: 26 May 1997
- Recorded: 1996–1997
- Genre: Pop
- Length: 50:54
- Labels: BMG; RCA; Arista
- Producers: Clive Davis (exec.); David Foster; Gary Barlow; Mike Rose; Nick Foster; Kristian Lundin; Max Martin; Carsten Schack; Kenneth Karlin; Stephen Lipson; Absolute; Grant Mitchell; Walter Afanasieff; Chris Porter; Simon Willis

Gary Barlow chronology
Open Road (1997)	Twelve Months, Eleven Days (1999)

Singles from Open Road (European Version)
- 1. "Forever Love" Released: 8 July 1996; 2. "Love Won't Wait" Released: 9 April 1997; 3. "So Help Me Girl" Released: 14 July 1997; 4. "Open Road" Released: 3 November 1997; 5. "Hang on in There Baby" Released: 3 April 1998

Singles from Open Road (American Version)
- 1. "So Help Me Girl" Released: 30 September 1997; 2. "Superhero" Released: 17 February 1998

Open Road is the debut solo album by British singer-songwriter Gary Barlow. It was released by BMG and RCA Records on 26 May 1997.

== Album information ==
Following the break-up of Take That, Barlow went straight into the recording studio and began recording a solo album. On 5 July 1996, the album's lead single, "Forever Love", was released, peaking at number one on the UK Singles Chart. A second single, "Love Won't Wait", was released in April 1997, also peaking at number one. On 26 May 1997, the album was subsequently released, peaking at number one on the UK Albums Chart on the week of release. The album was certified platinum. Following the album's release, a further two singles, "So Help Me Girl" and "Open Road" were released, which charted at 11 and 7 respectively with the third single becoming Barlow's first solo material to chart in America.

== International success ==
Following the success of the album in the United Kingdom and the album charting in over 21 countries internationally, Barlow set about releasing the album in the United States, and signed a record deal with Arista. He soon decided to re-work the album for the American market, and began promotion by releasing a remixed version of "So Help Me Girl" as the lead single, complete with a brand new video, on 30 September 1997. The album was subsequently released on 13 January 1998, and on 17 February, one of the new tracks for the American issue, "Superhero", was released as the second single. Although it became widely known for its use as the Yankees main theme, it failed to achieve any commercial success.

The album sold 2 million copies worldwide.

== Critical reception ==
Professional ratings
Review scores
Source	Rating
AllMusic	3/5 stars
Music Week	4/5 stars
NME	3/10

The San Diego Vista gave the album a positive review, stating that as a "singer and songwriter [Barlow] demonstrates his potential as a successful solo artist on Open Road. The album shows a diversity of musical styles, many acoustic-based tracks, a few haunting ballads and some scintillating up-tempo dance numbers." Rodel goes on to state that "on the title track, "Open Road," Gary's brilliant songwriting abilities are showcased in all its glory. A song that he wrote at the young age of 16, "Open Road" reveals Gary's journey through life [making it] perhaps the best song on Gary's debut album."

== Track listing ==
=== European edition ===
No.	Title	Writer(s)	Producer(s)	Length
1.	"Love Won't Wait"	Madonna Ciccone; Shep Pettibone	Stephen Lipson	4:17
2.	"So Help Me Girl"	Howard Perdew; Andy Spooner	David Foster	4:29
3.	"My Commitment"	Gary Barlow; Diane Warren	Walter Afanasieff	4:48
4.	"Hang on in There Baby"	Johnny Bristol	Trevor Horn	3:39
5.	"Are You Ready Now"	Barlow	Barlow; Grant Mitchell	4:19
6.	"Everything I Ever Wanted"	Barlow	Absolute	3:32
7.	"I Fall So Deep"	Larry Loftin; Amy Powers	Foster	4:02
8.	"Lay Down for Love"	Barlow; Richard Stannard; Matt Rowbottom	Barlow; Mitchell	5:33
9.	"Forever Love"	Barlow	Barlow; Chris Porter	4:55
10.	"Never Knew"	Barlow	Afanasieff	3:50
11.	"Open Road"	Barlow	Barlow; Porter; Absolute^{[a]}	4:23
12.	"Always"	Barlow	Barlow; Porter	3:32

Japanese edition bonus tracks
No.	Title	Writer(s)	Producer(s)	Length
13.	"The Meaning of a Love Song"	Gary Barlow	Porter, Barlow	3:37
14.	"Cuddly Toy"	Andrew Roachford	Mark Picchiotti	3:42

Spanish edition bonus track
No.	Title	Writer(s)	Producer(s)	Length
13.	"Ayúdame"	Howard Perdew, Andy Spooner, Nani Mano	Foster	4:26

=== US edition ===
No.	Title	Writer(s)	Producer(s)	Length
1.	"I Fall So Deep"	Larry Loftin, Mattias Gustafsson, Amy Powers	David Foster	4:02
2.	"Open Road"	Gary Barlow	Chris Porter, Barlow, Mike Rose^{[a]}, Nick Foster^{[a]}	4:23
3.	"Superhero"	Barlow, Max Martin, Joylon Skinner, Kristian Lundin	Martin, Lundin	3:35
4.	"My Commitment"	Barlow, Diane Warren	Walter Afanasieff, Soulshock & Karlin^{[b]}	4:13
5.	"Love Won't Wait"	Madonna, Shep Pettibone	Stephen Lipson, Junior Vasquez^{[c]}	4:21
6.	"So Help Me Girl"	Howard Perdew, Andy Spooner	Foster	4:29
7.	"Everything I Wanted"	Barlow	Absolute	3:32
8.	"Hang on in There Baby"	Johnny Bristol	Rose, Foster	3:39
9.	"Lay Down for Love"	Barlow, Richard Stannard, Matt Rowbottom	Grant Mitchell, Barlow	5:33
10.	"Never Knew"	Barlow	Afanasieff	3:50
11.	"Forever Love"	Barlow	Chris Porter, Barlow	4:55
12.	"Back for Good" (Live)	Barlow	Simon Willis	4:19

Australian special edition bonus CD-rom tracks
No.	Title	Length
1.	"Forever Love" (Video)	4:55
2.	"Love Won't Wait" (Video)	4:17
3.	"So Help Me Girl" (Video)	4:29

Notes

- ^{^[a]} signifies an additional producer
- ^{^[b]} signifies a remixer
- ^{^[c]} signifies a co-producer

== Personnel ==
Credits for Open Road adapted from AllMusic.

- Gary Barlow – composer, piano, producer, vocals
- Absolute – mixing, multi instruments, producer
- Walter Afanasieff – bass, drums, keyboards, organ, producer, programming, synthesizer
- Alex Black – assistant engineer
- Greg Calbi – mastering
- Andreas Carlsson – backing vocals
- Jake Chessum – photography
- Clive Davis – executive producer
- Joey Diggs – backing vocals
- Felipe Elgueta – engineer
- David Foster – arranger, vocals, keyboards, producer
- Nick Foster – keyboards, producer, programming, remixing
- Simon Franglen – programming
- Paul Gendler – guitar
- David Gleeson – engineer, mixing
- Nathaniel Goldberg – photography
- Jeff Griffin – assistant engineer
- Sandy Griffith – backing vocals
- Mick Guzauski – mixing
- Phillip Ingram – backing vocals
- Judy Kirschner – assistant engineer
- Bob Kraushaar – mixing
- Kristian Lawing – Producer
- Stephen Lipson – producer
- Richard Lowe – mixing
- Milton Mcdonald – guitar
- Madonna – composer
- Manny Marroquin – engineer, mixing
- Max Martin – producer, backing vocals
- Grant Mitchell – arranger, producer, programming
- P. Dennis Mitchell – mixing
- Heff Moraes – engineer
- Joey Moskowitz – programming
- Esbjörn Öhrwall – guitar
- Dean Parks – guitar
- Shep Pettibone – composer
- Chris Porter – producer
- Claytoven Richardson – backing vocals
- Marnie Riley – mixing assistant
- Mike Rose – keyboards, producer, programming, remixing
- Marc Russo – guest artist, tenor saxophone
- Mike Scott – assistant engineer
- Dan Shea – keyboards, programming
- Andy Spooner – composer
- Christopher Stern – art direction
- Ren Swan – engineer
- Michael Thompson – guitar
- Jeanie Tracy – backing vocals
- Junior Vasquez – producer
- Norman Watson – photography
- Dave Way – mixing
- Wil Wheaton – backing vocals
- Simon Willis – producer
- Tim Willis – engineer

== Charts ==
=== Weekly charts ===
Chart (1997)	Peak Position
Australian Albums (ARIA)	30
Austrian Albums (Ö3 Austria Top 75)	13
Belgian (Ultratop 50 Vlaanderen) Albums	7
Belgian (Ultratop 50 Wallonia) Albums	20
Danish Albums (Tracklisten)	6
Dutch Albums (MegaCharts)	13
Estonian Albums (Eesti Top 10)	7
European Albums Chart	4
Finnish Albums (Suomen virallinen lista)	29
German Albums (Media Control AG)	10
Greek Albums (IFPI Greece)	3
Hungarian Albums (MAHASZ)	33
Irish Albums (IRMA)	1
Italian Albums (FIMI)	8
Japanese Albums (Oricon)	40
Malaysian Albums (IFPI)	3
New Zealand Albums (RIANZ)	43
Norwegian Albums (VG-lista)	34
Scottish Albums (Official Charts)	2
Singapore Albums (SPVA)	3
Spanish Albums (PROMUSICAE)	5
Swedish Albums (Sverigetopplistan)	25
Swiss Albums (Schweizer Hitparade)	6
Taiwanese Albums (IFPI)	1
UK Albums (Official Charts)	1

=== Year-end charts ===
Chart (1997)	Position
German Albums (Offizielle Top 100)	100
UK Albums (OCC)	43

== Certifications and sales ==
Region	Certification	Certified units/sales
United Kingdom (BPI)	Platinum	300,000^{^}
^{^} Shipments figures based on certification alone.
