= Hang On in There Baby =

1974 single by Johnny Bristol

"Hang on in There Baby"

Single by Johnny Bristol

from the album Hang On in There Baby
- B-side: "Take Care of You for Me"
- Released: June 1974
- Recorded: 1974
- Genre: Soul
- Length: 3:23
- Label: MGM
- Songwriter: Johnny Bristol
- Producer: Johnny Bristol

Music video
- "Hang On In There Baby": TopPop on YouTube

"Hang On in There Baby" is a song written by American musician Johnny Bristol and arranged by H. B. Barnum as the title track from his first album, Hang on in There Baby (1974). It was released as his debut solo single in 1974 by MGM Records, reaching No. 8 on the US Hot 100 and No. 2 on the US Billboard R&B chart. On the UK Singles Chart, it reached No. 3.

== Charts ==
=== Weekly charts ===
Chart (1974)	Peak position
Canada Top Singles (RPM)	3
Ireland (IRMA)	20
Netherlands (Dutch Top 40)	10
UK Singles (OCC)	3
US Billboard Hot 100	8
US Hot Soul Singles (Billboard)	2
US Cash Box Top 100	8

=== Year-end charts ===
Chart (1974)	Rank
Canada (RPM)	56
UK Singles (OCC)	35
US Billboard Hot 100	61
US Cash Box Top 100	35

== Curiosity version ==
"Hang On in There Baby"
- Vinyl cover

Single by Curiosity

from the album Back to Front
- B-side: "Meaning of Dreaming"
- Released: 1992
- Length: 3:08
- Label: RCA
- Songwriter: Johnny Bristol
- Producers: Mark Taylor, Terry Adams

Curiosity singles chronology
"First Place" (1989)	"Hang On in There Baby" (1992)	"I Need Your Lovin'" (1992)

A cover version was released in 1992 by English band Curiosity Killed the Cat, whose name was shortened to Curiosity starting from this release. The lead single from their third album, Back to Front (1994) under RCA Records, the song is the band's joint biggest hit alongside "Down to Earth", peaking at No. 3 on the UK Singles Chart.

=== Track listings ===
- 7-inch and cassette
1. "Hang On in There Baby" – 3:08
2. "Meaning of Dreaming" – 4:20
- 12-inch
1. "Hang On in There Baby" (Extended Club Mix) – 4:52
2. Hang On in There Baby (After Hours Mix) – 3:52
3. Hang On in There Baby (Dub Mix) – 3:52
4. "Meaning of Dreaming" – 4:20
- CD single
1. Hang On in There Baby (7" Version) – 3:08
2. "Hang On in There Baby" (Extended Club Mix) – 4:52
3. "Meaning of Dreaming" – 4:20

=== Charts ===
==== Weekly charts ====
Chart (1992)	Peak position
Australia (ARIA)	127
Austria (Ö3 Austria Top 40)	38
Belgium (Ultratop 50 Flanders)	38
Europe (Eurochart Hot 100)	8
Europe (European Hit Radio)	3
Germany (GfK)	42
Ireland (IRMA)	10
Italy (Musica e dischi)	23
New Zealand (Recorded Music NZ)	32
Sweden (Sverigetopplistan)	31
UK Singles (Official Charts)	3
UK Airplay (Music Week)	2

==== Year-end charts ====
Chart (1992)	Position
Europe (European Hit Radio)	34
UK Singles (OCC)	65
UK Airplay (Music Week)	26

== Other versions ==
- In 1979, American singer Bette Midler, for her fifth album Thighs and Whispers.
- In 1980, American disco girl group Alton McClain and Destiny, for their second album More of You. This features the vocals of Johnny Bristol.
- In 1993, American hip hop musician K7, for his debut album Swing Batta Swing.
- In 1997, British singer Gary Barlow, for his debut solo album Open Road.
- In 2000, British boy band Worlds Apart, in their CD single I Will Part 2.
- In 2005, X Factor winner Steve Brookstein, for his debut album Heart and Soul.
- In 2015, English boy band Blue, for their fifth album Colours.
