= 2012 in British music =

This is a summary of 2012 in music in the United Kingdom. In 2012, dance music continued to dominate the charts.

== Events ==
- 1 January – Musicians honoured in the Queen's New Year Honours list include conductor Antonio Pappano (knighthood), record producer Steve Lillywhite (CBE), composer and conductor Rev Ronald Corp (OBE) and Ralph Allwood (MBE), former director of music at Eton College.
- 4 June – A Diamond Jubilee Concert is held outside Buckingham Palace on The Mall, London, organised by Gary Barlow as part of Queen Elizabeth II's Diamond Jubilee celebrations. Performers include Gary Barlow, Robbie Williams, Sir Elton John, Sir Paul McCartney, Grace Jones, Alfie Boe, Sir Cliff Richard, Sir Tom Jones, Dame Shirley Bassey and Stevie Wonder.
- 8-10 June – Download Festival 2012 takes place at Donington Park in Leicestershire. The Jim Marshall main stage is headlined by The Prodigy, Metallica and Black Sabbath, the Zippo encore stage by Slash Featuring Myles Kennedy & The Conspirators, You Me at Six and Rise Against, the Pepsi Max Stage by Devin Townsend Project, The Mission and Periphery, the Red Bull Bedroom Jam Stage by Cancer Bats, Cockney Rejects and William Control, and the Jägermeister Acoustic stage by Yashin, Tyla and Saint Jude.
- 16 June – Musicians honoured in the Queen's Birthday Honours list include Gary Barlow (OBE), violinist Tasmin Little (OBE) and Gareth Malone (OBE).
- 27 July – On the opening day of the 2012 Summer Olympics, at 8.15, Martin Creed's controversial work "All The Bells", is performed by the bells of London.
- 12 August – The 2012 Summer Olympics closing ceremony, also known by the title "A Symphony of British music", takes place at London's Olympic Stadium. Performers include Take That, One Direction, The Spice Girls, Madness, George Michael, Julian Lloyd Webber, Pet Shop Boys, Ray Davies, Annie Lennox, Kaiser Chiefs and Emeli Sandé.
- 9 December – James Arthur wins the ninth series of The X Factor. Jahméne Douglas is named runner-up, while Christopher Maloney and Union J finish in third and fourth place respectively.

== Artists/groups reformed ==
- Spice Girls
- 911
- Atomic Kitten
- B*Witched
- Five
- Honeyz
- Kitchens Of Distinction
- Liberty X
- Six By Seven
- The Supernaturals

== Groups disbanded ==
- Westlife
- Jet
- Viva Brother
- The King Blues
- SoundGirl
- Pendulum
- Chumbawamba
- Does It Offend You, Yeah?

== Classical music ==
=== New works ===
- Peter Maxwell Davies – Symphony No. 9
- Howard Goodall – Every Purpose Under the Heaven (The King James Bible Oratorio)
- Karl Jenkins – The Peacemakers
- Philip Ledger – This Holy Child (cantata)
- Philip Moore – "I will lift up mine eyes"

=== Opera ===
- George Benjamin – Written on Skin
- Stephen Crowe – The Francis Bacon Opera
- Neil Hannon – Sevastopol

== British music awards ==
=== BRIT Awards ===
The 2012 BRIT Awards were held on 21 February 2012 at The O2 Arena, London and hosted by James Corden. The most notable winners were Adele and Ed Sheeran, both winning two awards.

- British Male Solo Artist: Ed Sheeran
- British Female Solo Artist: Adele
- British Breakthrough Act: Ed Sheeran
- British Group: Coldplay
- British Single: "What Makes You Beautiful" – One Direction
- MasterCard British Album: 21 – Adele
- International Male Solo Artist: Bruno Mars
- International Female Solo Artist: Rihanna
- International Group: Foo Fighters
- International Breakthrough Act: Lana Del Rey
- British Producer: Ethan Johns
- Critics' Choice: Emeli Sandé
- Outstanding Contribution to Music: Blur

=== Ivor Novello Awards ===
The 57th Ivor Novello Awards were held on 17 May 2012 at the Grosvenor House Hotel, London.

- Best Contemporary Song: "Video Games" – Lana Del Rey (written by Lana Del Rey and Justin Parker)
- PRS for Music Most Performed Work: "Rolling in the Deep" – Adele (written by Adele Adkins and Paul Epworth)
- Best Television Soundtrack: The Shadow Line (composed by Martin Phipps)
- The Ivors Jazz Award: Stan Tracey
- Album Award: Let England Shake – PJ Harvey (written by PJ Harvey)
- Outstanding Song Collection: Gary Kemp
- The Ivors Inspiration Award: Siouxsie Sioux
- Best Original Film Score: The First Grader (composed by Alex Heffes)
- PRS for Music Outstanding Contribution to British Music: Gary Barlow, Howard Donald, Jason Orange, Mark Owen and Robbie Williams (Take That)
- Best Song Musically and Lyrically: "The A Team" – Ed Sheeran (written by Ed Sheeran)
- Lifetime Achievement: Mark Knopfler
- Songwriter of the Year: Adele Adkins
- PRS for Music Special International Award: Jimmy Webb
- BASCA Fellowship: Andrew Lloyd Webber

=== Classical BRIT Awards ===
The 2012 Classic BRIT Awards were held on 2 October 2012 at the Royal Albert Hall, London and were hosted by Myleene Klass.

- Female Artist: Nicola Benedetti (Italia)
- MasterCard Breakthrough Artist of the Year Award: Miloš Karadaglić (Latino)
- Composer: John Williams (War Horse, The Adventures of Tintin: The Secret of the Unicorn)
- International Artist of the Year in association with Raymond Weil: Andrea Bocelli
- Critics' Award: Benjamin Grosvenor (Chopin/Liszt/Ravel)
- Male Artist: Vasily Petrenko (Shostakovich/Symphony No. 1 & 3, Shostakovich/Symphony No. 6 & 12, Shostakovich/Symphony No. 2 & 15, Rachmaninov/Piano Concertos 1 & 4, Rachmaninov/Symphony No. 3)
- Classic BRITs Single of the Year in association with iTunes: "Wherever You Are" – Military Wives with Gareth Malone
- Lifetime Achievement Award: John Williams
- Classic FM Album of the Year in association with MasterCard: And The Waltz Goes On – André Rieu

=== Mercury Prize ===
The 2012 Barclaycard Mercury Prize was awarded on 1 November 2012 to Alt-J for their album An Awesome Wave.

=== Popjustice £20 Music Prize ===
The 2012 Popjustice £20 Music Prize was awarded on 1 November 2012 to Will Young for his single "Jealousy".

=== British Composer Awards ===
The 10th British Composer Awards were held on 3 December 2012 at Goldsmiths' Hall, London and hosted by Sara Mohr-Pietsch and Andrew McGregor.

- Instrumental Solo or Duo: Learning Self-Modulation – Christian Mason
- Chamber: The Four Quarters – Thomas Adès
- Vocal: No Man's Land – Colin Matthews
- Choral: Airplane Cantata – Gabriel Jackson
- Wind Band or Brass Band: A Symphony of Colours – Simon Dobson
- Orchestral: Concerto for Violin and Orchestra – Harrison Birtwistle
- Stage Works: DESH – Jocelyn Pook
- Liturgical: Missa Brevis – Francis Grier
- Sonic Art: The Ethometric Museum – Ray Lee
- Contemporary Jazz Composition: Sailing to Byzantium – Christine Tobin
- Community or Educational Project: The Chimpanzees of Happytown – Paul Rissmann
- Making Music Award: Mesmerism for Piano and Chamber Orchestra – Emily Howard
- International Award: Concerto for Violin, Cello and Orchestra – Thomas Larcher

=== The Record of the Year ===
The 2012 Record of the Year was awarded to "Somebody That I Used to Know" by Gotye featuring Kimbra. This was the final year that The Record of the Year was awarded.

== Charts and sales ==
=== Number-one singles ===
| Chart date (week ending) | Song | Artist(s) | Sales | References |
|---|---|---|---|---|
| 7 January | "Paradise" | Coldplay | 108,390 | |
| 14 January | "Good Feeling" | Flo Rida | 50,907 | |
| 21 January | "Domino" | Jessie J | 57,369 | |
| 28 January | "Domino" | Jessie J | 64,255 | |
| 4 February | "Twilight" | Cover Drive | 76,109 | |
| 11 February | "Titanium" | David Guetta featuring Sia | 85,985 | |
| 18 February | "Somebody That I Used to Know" | Gotye featuring Kimbra | 83,265 | |
| 25 February | "Hot Right Now" | DJ Fresh featuring Rita Ora | 127,998 | |
| 3 March | "Somebody That I Used to Know" | Gotye featuring Kimbra | 95,338 | |
| 10 March | "Somebody That I Used to Know" | Gotye featuring Kimbra | 87,057 | |
| 17 March | "Somebody That I Used to Know" | Gotye featuring Kimbra | 81,437 | |
| 24 March | "Somebody That I Used to Know" | Gotye featuring Kimbra | 71,521 | |
| 31 March | "Part of Me" | Katy Perry | 79,079 | |
| 7 April | "Turn Up the Music" | Chris Brown | 83,777 | |
| 14 April | "Call Me Maybe" | Carly Rae Jepsen | 106,657 | |
| 21 April | "Call Me Maybe" | Carly Rae Jepsen | 110,024 | |
| 28 April | "Call Me Maybe" | Carly Rae Jepsen | 114,993 | |
| 5 May | "Call Me Maybe" | Carly Rae Jepsen | 99,569 | |
| 12 May | "Young" | Tulisa | 121,694 | |
| 19 May | "R.I.P." | Rita Ora featuring Tinie Tempah | 104,592 | |
| 26 May | "R.I.P." | Rita Ora featuring Tinie Tempah | 57,434 | |
| 2 June | "We Are Young" | Fun. featuring Janelle Monáe | 72,977 | |
| 9 June | "Feel the Love" | Rudimental featuring John Newman | 93,841 | |
| 16 June | "Sing" | Gary Barlow & The Commonwealth Band featuring Military Wives | 141,670 | |
| 23 June | "Call My Name" | Cheryl | 152,001 | |
| 30 June | "Payphone" | Maroon 5 featuring Wiz Khalifa | 141,410 | |
| 7 July | "This Is Love" | will.i.am featuring Eva Simons | 102,320 | |
| 14 July | "Payphone" | Maroon 5 featuring Wiz Khalifa | 73,998 | |
| 21 July | "Spectrum (Say My Name)" | Florence + The Machine | 64,816 | |
| 28 July | "Spectrum (Say My Name)" | Florence + The Machine | 63,960 | |
| 4 August | "Spectrum (Say My Name)" | Florence + The Machine | 65,790 | |
| 11 August | "Heatwave" | Wiley featuring Ms D | 114,121 | |
| 18 August | "Heatwave" | Wiley featuring Ms D | 69,713 | |
| 25 August | "How We Do (Party)" | Rita Ora | 100,436 | |
| 1 September | "Bom Bom" | Sam and the Womp | 107,461 | |
| 8 September | "Wings" | Little Mix | 106,766 | |
| 15 September | "Let Me Love You (Until You Learn to Love Yourself)" | Ne-Yo | 88,784 | |
| 22 September | "Hall of Fame" | The Script featuring will.i.am | 70,150 | |
| 29 September | "Hall of Fame" | The Script featuring will.i.am | 63,980 | |
| 6 October | "Gangnam Style" | Psy | 84,421 | |
| 13 October | "Diamonds" | Rihanna | 105,953 | |
| 20 October | "Don't You Worry Child" | Swedish House Mafia featuring John Martin | 135,563 | |
| 27 October | "Sweet Nothing" | Calvin Harris featuring Florence Welch | 94,154 | |
| 3 November | "Beneath Your Beautiful" | Labrinth featuring Emeli Sandé | 107,775 | |
| 10 November | "Candy" | Robbie Williams | 137,581 | |
| 17 November | "Candy" | Robbie Williams | 90,812 | |
| 24 November | "Little Things" | One Direction | 85,308 | |
| 1 December | "Troublemaker" | Olly Murs featuring Flo Rida | 121,497 | |
| 8 December | "Troublemaker" | Olly Murs featuring Flo Rida | 82,696 | |
| 15 December | "The Power of Love" | Gabrielle Aplin | 57,515 | |
| 22 December | "Impossible" | James Arthur | 489,560 | |
| 29 December | "He Ain't Heavy, He's My Brother" | The Justice Collective | 269,248 | |

=== Number-one albums ===
| Chart date (week ending) | Album | Artist | Sales | References |
|---|---|---|---|---|
| 7 January | + | Ed Sheeran | 47,376 | |
| 14 January | 21 | Adele | 38,380 | |
| 21 January | Doo-Wops & Hooligans | Bruno Mars | 24,509 | |
| 28 January | 21 | Adele | 20,978 | |
| 4 February | + | Ed Sheeran | 20,607 | |
| 11 February | Born to Die | Lana Del Rey | 116,745 | |
| 18 February | Born to Die | Lana Del Rey | 60,003 | |
| 25 February | Our Version of Events | Emeli Sandé | 113,319 | |
| 3 March | 21 | Adele | 65,091 | |
| 10 March | Our Version of Events | Emeli Sandé | 44,722 | |
| 17 March | Wrecking Ball | Bruce Springsteen | 74,401 | |
| 24 March | In My Dreams | Military Wives | 59,026 | |
| 31 March | Sonik Kicks | Paul Weller | 30,269 | |
| 7 April | MDNA | Madonna | 56,335 | |
| 14 April | Pink Friday: Roman Reloaded | Nicki Minaj | 47,462 | |
| 21 April | 21 | Adele | 22,235 | |
| 28 April | 21 | Adele | 17,065 | |
| 5 May | Blunderbuss | Jack White | 40,173 | |
| 12 May | Electra Heart | Marina & the Diamonds | 21,358 | |
| 19 May | Strangeland | Keane | 47,839 | |
| 26 May | Strangeland | Keane | 19,982 | |
| 2 June | Our Version of Events | Emeli Sandé | 13,430 | |
| 9 June | Sing | Gary Barlow & The Commonwealth Band | 40,020 | |
| 16 June | Sing | Gary Barlow & The Commonwealth Band | 75,538 | |
| 23 June | Sing | Gary Barlow & The Commonwealth Band | 28,159 | |
| 30 June | Believe | Justin Bieber | 38,115 | |
| 7 July | Living Things | Linkin Park | 41,526 | |
| 14 July | Fortune | Chris Brown | 29,980 | |
| 21 July | Write It On Your Skin | Newton Faulkner | 16,647 | |
| 28 July | Good Morning to the Night | Elton John vs Pnau | 14,342 | |
| 4 August | iLL Manors | Plan B | 36,855 | |
| 11 August | Contrast | Conor Maynard | 17,474 | |
| 18 August | Talk That Talk | Rihanna | 9,578 | |
| 25 August | Our Version of Events | Emeli Sandé | 30,825 | |
| 1 September | Our Version of Events | Emeli Sandé | 25,581 | |
| 8 September | ORA | Rita Ora | 41,509 | |
| 15 September | Come of Age | The Vaccines | 44,395 | |
| 22 September | Coexist | The xx | 58,266 | |
| 29 September | Battle Born | The Killers | 93,989 | |
| 6 October | Babel | Mumford & Sons | 158,923 | |
| 13 October | The 2nd Law | Muse | 108,536 | |
| 20 October | Babel | Mumford & Sons | 42,027 | |
| 27 October | Jake Bugg | Jake Bugg | 35,785 | |
| 3 November | Red | Taylor Swift | 61,779 | |
| 10 November | 18 Months | Calvin Harris | 52,356 | |
| 17 November | Take the Crown | Robbie Williams | 83,508 | |
| 24 November | Take Me Home | One Direction | 155,316 | |
| 1 December | Unapologetic | Rihanna | 99,357 | |
| 8 December | Right Place Right Time | Olly Murs | 126,949 | |
| 15 December | Right Place Right Time | Olly Murs | 103,464 | |
| 22 December | Unorthodox Jukebox | Bruno Mars | 136,391 | |
| 29 December | Our Version of Events | Emeli Sandé | 177,696 | |

=== Number-one compilation albums ===
| Chart date (week ending) | Album | References |
|---|---|---|
| 7 January | Now 80 | |
| 14 January | Now 80 | |
| 21 January | Now 80 | |
| 28 January | Now 80 | |
| 4 February | Be My Baby | |
| 11 February | Be My Baby | |
| 18 February | Be My Baby | |
| 25 February | Be My Baby | |
| 3 March | BRIT Awards 2012 | |
| 10 March | Dreamboats & Petticoats – The Petticoat | |
| 17 March | Now Running | |
| 24 March | Be My Baby | |
| 31 March | Now Running | |
| 7 April | Ultimate Clubland | |
| 14 April | Now 81 | |
| 21 April | Now 81 | |
| 28 April | Now 81 | |
| 5 May | Now 81 | |
| 12 May | Now 81 | |
| 19 May | Now 81 | |
| 26 May | Now 81 | |
| 2 June | Now 81 | |
| 9 June | Now 81 | |
| 16 June | Now 81 | |
| 23 June | Dreamboats & Petticoats – Three Steps | |
| 30 June | Now 81 | |
| 7 July | Clubland 21 | |
| 14 July | Now Reggae | |
| 21 July | Now No.1 | |
| 28 July | Now No.1 | |
| 4 August | Now 82 | |
| 11 August | Now 82 | |
| 18 August | Now 82 | |
| 25 August | Now 82 | |
| 1 September | Now 82 | |
| 8 September | Now 82 | |
| 15 September | Now 82 | |
| 22 September | Now 82 | |
| 29 September | Now 82 | |
| 6 October | Now 82 | |
| 13 October | Now 82 | |
| 20 October | Now 82 | |
| 27 October | Now 82 | |
| 3 November | Until Now | |
| 10 November | BBC Radio 1's Live Lounge – 2012 | |
| 17 November | BBC Radio 1's Live Lounge – 2012 | |
| 24 November | Pop Party 10 | |
| 1 December | Now 83 | |
| 8 December | Now 83 | |
| 15 December | Now 83 | |
| 22 December | Now 83 | |
| 29 December | Now 83 | |

=== Best-selling singles of 2012 ===
| No. | Title | Artist | Peak position | Sales |
|---|---|---|---|---|
| 1 | "Somebody That I Used to Know" | Gotye featuring Kimbra | 1 | 1,318,005 |
| 2 | "Call Me Maybe" | Carly Rae Jepsen | 1 | 1,142,995 |
| 3 | "We Are Young" | Fun featuring Janelle Monáe | 1 | 986,000 |
| 4 | "Titanium" | David Guetta featuring Sia | 1 | 922,000 |
| 5 | "Impossible" | James Arthur | 1 | 897,000 |
| 6 | "Gangnam Style" | Psy | 1 | 878,000 |
| 7 | "Starships" | Nicki Minaj | 2 | 864,000 |
| 8 | "Domino" | Jessie J | 1 | 749,000 |
| 9 | "Payphone" | Maroon 5 featuring Wiz Khalifa | 1 | 725,000 |
| 10 | "Wild Ones" | Flo Rida featuring Sia | 4 | 695,000 |
| 11 | "Diamonds" | Rihanna | 1 | 672,000 |
| 12 | "Beneath Your Beautiful" | Labrinth featuring Emeli Sandé | 1 | 663,000 |
| 13 | "Don't You Worry Child" | Swedish House Mafia featuring John Martin | 1 | 632,000 |
| 14 | "Next to Me" | Emeli Sandé | 2 | 621,000 |
| 15 | "Whistle" | Flo Rida | 2 | 620,000 |
| 16 | "Feel the Love" | Rudimental featuring John Newman | 1 | 619,000 |
| 17 | "Mama Do the Hump" | Rizzle Kicks | 2 | 559,000 |
| 18 | "Too Close" | Alex Clare | 4 | 557,000 |
| 19 | "Spectrum" | Florence and the Machine | 1 | 554,000 |
| 20 | "Skyfall" | Adele | 2 | 547,000 |
| 21 | "Hall of Fame" | The Script featuring will.i.am | 1 | 529,000 |
| 22 | "Candy" | Robbie Williams | 1 | 503,000 |
| 23 | "Drive By" | Train | 6 | 502,700 |
| 24 | "Hot Right Now" | DJ Fresh featuring Rita Ora | 1 | 482,000 |
| 25 | "Princess of China" | Coldplay & Rihanna | 4 | 475,000 |
| 26 | "We Are Never Ever Getting Back Together" | Taylor Swift | 4 | 465,000 |
| 27 | "Black Heart" | Stooshe | 3 | 456,000 |
| 28 | "R.I.P" | Rita Ora featuring Tinie Tempah | 1 | 453,000 |
| 29 | "Troublemaker" | Olly Murs featuring Flo Rida | 1 | 441,000 |
| 30 | "Sexy and I Know It" | LMFAO | 9 (Note: Reached number 5 in 2011) | 434,000 |
| 31 | "Niggas in Paris" | Jay-Z & Kanye West | 10 | 432,000 |
| 32 | "Where Have You Been" | Rihanna | 6 | 422,200 |
| 33 | "Locked Out of Heaven" | Bruno Mars | 2 | 421,000 |
| 34 | "Call My Name" | Cheryl Cole | 1 | 420,700 |
| 35 | "Turn Me On" | David Guetta featuring Nicki Minaj | 8 | 417,000 |
| 36 | "Stronger (What Doesn't Kill You)" | Kelly Clarkson | 8 | 416,685 |
| 37 | "Don't Wake Me Up" | Chris Brown | 2 | 416,684 |
| 38 | "Heatwave" | Wiley featuring Ms D | 1 | 416,000 |
| 39 | "This Is Love" | will.i.am featuring Eva Simons | 1 | 403,000 |
| 40 | "Wings" | Little Mix | 1 | 397,000 |
| 41 | "She Doesn't Mind" | Sean Paul | 2 | |
| 42 | "Bom Bom" | Sam and the Womp | 1 | |
| 43 | "Young" | Tulisa | 1 | |
| 44 | "212" | Azealia Banks featuring Lazy Jay | 12 | |
| 45 | "Paradise" | Coldplay | 1 | |
| 46 | "I Won't Give Up" | Jason Mraz | 11 | |
| 47 | "Good Feeling" | Flo Rida | 1 | |
| 48 | "Sweet Nothing" | Calvin Harris featuring Florence Welch | 1 | |
| 49 | "He Ain't Heavy, He's My Brother" | The Justice Collective | 1 | |
| 50 | "How We Do (Party)" | Rita Ora | 1 | |

=== Best-selling albums of 2012 ===
| No. | Title | Artist | Peak position | Sales |
|---|---|---|---|---|
| 1 | Our Version of Events | Emeli Sandé | 1 | 1,393,000 |
| 2 | 21 | Adele | 1 | 786,424 |
| 3 | + | Ed Sheeran | 1 | 784,000 |
| 4 | Born to Die | Lana Del Rey | 1 | 719,000 |
| 5 | Take Me Home | One Direction | 1 | 616,000 |
| 6 | Babel | Mumford & Sons | 1 | 573,000 |
| 7 | Right Place Right Time | Olly Murs | 1 | 570,000 |
| 8 | Christmas | Michael Bublé | 2 (Note: Reached number 1 in 2011) | 503,000 |
| 9 | Mylo Xyloto | Coldplay | 3 (Note: Reached number 1 in 2011) | 476,000 |
| 10 | Unapologetic | Rihanna | 1 | 475,000 |
| 11 | Fall to Grace | Paloma Faith | 2 | 449,000 |
| 12 | The Truth About Love | Pink | 2 | 446,000 |
| 13 | Take The Crown | Robbie Williams | 1 | 445,500 |
| 14 | Merry Christmas, Baby | Rod Stewart | 2 | 421,000 |
| 15 | Up All Night | One Direction | 8 (Note: Reached number 2 in 2011) | 372,000 |
| 16 | Who You Are | Jessie J | 4 (Note: Reached number 2 in 2011) | 370,000 |
| 17 | 18 Months | Calvin Harris | 1 | 354,000 |
| 18 | The Very Best Of | Neil Diamond | 5 | 334,000 |
| 19 | Talk That Talk | Rihanna | 1 | 333,000 |
| 20 | In Case You Didn't Know | Olly Murs | 4 (Note: Reached number 1 in 2011) | 332,000 |
| 21 | Nothing but the Beat | David Guetta | 2 | 315,000 |
| 22 | #3 | The Script | 2 | 312,000 |
| 23 | Some Nights | Fun. | 4 | 310,000 |
| 24 | Unorthodox Jukebox | Bruno Mars | 1 | 307,000 |
| 25 | Magic of the Movies | André Rieu & Johann Strauss Orchestra | 2 | 302,000 |
| 26 | Doo-Wops and Hooligans | Bruno Mars | 1 | 291,000 |
| 27 | Battle Born | The Killers | 1 | 271,000 |
| 28 | Every Kingdom | Ben Howard | 7 | 269,000 |
| 29 | Overexposed | Maroon 5 | 2 | 263,000 |
| 30 | Ceremonials | Florence + the Machine | 8 (Note: Reached number 1 in 2011) | 262,000 |
| 31 | GRRR! | The Rolling Stones | 3 | 258,000 |
| 32 | The 2nd Law | Muse | 1 | 255,000 |
| 33 | Noel Gallagher's High Flying Birds | Noel Gallagher's High Flying Birds | 8 (Note: Reached number 1 in 2011) | 247,000 |
| 34 | Storyteller | Alfie Boe | 9 | 245,000 |
| 35 | Ora | Rita Ora | 1 | 242,500 |
| 36 | Heaven | Rebecca Ferguson | 5 (Note: Reached number 3 in 2011) | 242,300 |
| 37 | Pink Friday: Roman Reloaded | Nicki Minaj | 1 | 242,000 |
| 38 | El Camino | The Black Keys | 6 | 239,000 |
| 39 | DNA | Little Mix | 3 | 234,000 |
| 40 | Stereo Typical | Rizzle Kicks | 5 | 233,900 |
| 41 | Making Mirrors | Gotye | 4 | |
| 42 | Red | Taylor Swift | 1 | |
| 43 | 19 | Adele | 7 (Note: Reached number 1 in 2008) | |
| 44 | In My Dreams | Military Wives | 1 | |
| 45 | Lonely Are the Brave | Maverick Sabre | 2 | |
| 46 | Electronic Earth | Labrinth | 2 | |
| 47 | Wrecking Ball | Bruce Springsteen | 1 | |
| 48 | Teenage Dream | Katy Perry | 6 (Note: Reached number 1 in 2010) | |
| 49 | Sigh No More | Mumford & Sons | 10 (Note: Reached number 2 in 2011) | |
| 50 | Number Ones | Bee Gees | 4 | |

== Deaths ==
- 3 January – Bob Weston, guitarist with Fleetwood Mac, 64 (gastrointestinal haemorrhage and cirrhosis of the liver)
- 4 January – Kerry McGregor, contestant on the third series of The X Factor, 37 (bladder cancer)
- 11 January – David Whitaker, English composer and conductor, 81
- 27 January – Ted Dicks, composer, 83
- 6 February – Jim King, saxophonist with Family, 69
- 9 February – Joe Moretti, Scottish-South African guitarist and songwriter with Nero and the Gladiators, 73
- 15 February – Clive Shakespeare, English-Australian guitarist, songwriter, and producer with Sherbet, 64 (cancer)
- 21 February – John Charles Winter, organist, 88
- 29 February – Davy Jones, singer and percussionist with the Monkees, 66 (heart attack)
- 1 March – Peter Graeme, oboist, 90
- 20 April – Bert Weedon, guitarist, 91
- 11 May – Roland Shaw, composer, arranger, and bandleader, 91
- 14 May – Derek Hammond-Stroud, operatic baritone, 86
- 20 May – Robin Gibb, singer and songwriter with the Bee Gees, 62 (liver cancer)
- 3 June – Andy Hamilton, Jamaican-born jazz saxophonist and composer, 94
- 17 June – Brian Hibbard, singer with the Flying Pickets and actor, 65 (prostate cancer)
- 7 July – Alf Pearson, singer and variety performer as one half of the double act Bob and Alf Pearson, 102
- 10 July – Lol Coxhill, saxophonist, 79
- 11 July – Jean Allister, opera singer, 80
- 16 July – Jon Lord, musician with Deep Purple and Whitesnake, and classical composer, 71 (pancreatic cancer)
- 23 July – Graham Jackson, conductor, 45 (cancer)
- 17 August – Lou Martin, keyboard player, 63
- 31 August – Max Bygraves, singer and variety performer, 89 (Alzheimer's disease)
- 2 September – John C. Marshall, jazz musician, 71
- 4 September – Ian Parrott, composer and academic, 96
- 15 September – George Hurst, conductor, 86
- 2 October – Big Jim Sullivan, guitarist, 71 (heart disease and diabetes)
- 12 October – Geraldine Mucha, composer, 95
- 18 November – Sir Philip Ledger, composer and academic, 74
- 26 October – Jo Dunne, guitarist with We've Got a Fuzzbox and We're Gonna Use It, 43 (cancer)
- 6 November – Clive Dunn, actor and singer, 92
- 18 November
  - Stan Greig, pianist, drummer, and bandleader, 82 (Parkinson's disease)
  - Sir Philip Ledger, English organist, composer, and academic, 74
- 20 November – Michael Dunford guitarist and songwriter with Renaissance (cerebral haemorrhage)
- 24 November – Ian Campbell, folk musician, 79 (cancer)
- 4 December – Jonathan Harvey, composer, 73 (motor neurone disease)

== See also ==
- 2012 in British radio
- 2012 in British television
- 2012 in the United Kingdom
- List of British films of 2012
