= List of UK top-ten albums in 2012 =

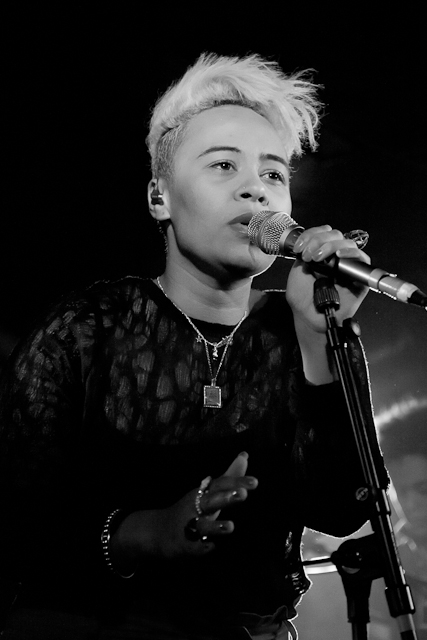
Emeli Sandé had the UK's best-selling album of 2012 with her debut release Our Version of Events, which lasted 67 weeks in the top 10 and spent a total of 10 weeks at number-one. The album has since sold more than 2.3 million copies in the UK alone.

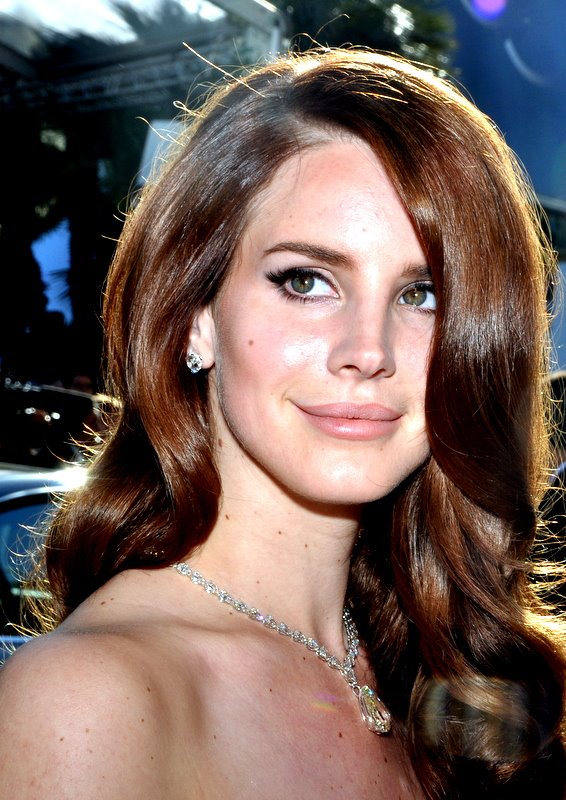
Lana Del Rey reached number-one for two weeks in February 2012 with her second studio album Born to Die, which spent 15 weeks in the top 10 and became the UK's fourth best selling album of the year.

The UK Albums Chart is one of many music charts compiled by the Official Charts Company that calculates the best-selling albums of the week in the United Kingdom. Since 2004 the chart has been based on the sales of both physical albums and digital downloads. This list shows albums that peaked in the Top 10 of the UK Albums Chart during 2012, as well as albums which peaked in 2011 and 2013 but were in the top 10 in 2012. The entry date is when the album appeared in the top 10 for the first time (week ending, as published by the Official Charts Company, which is six days after the chart is announced).

One hundred and sixty-three albums were in the top 10 this year. Seventeen albums from 2011 remained in the top 10 for several weeks at the beginning of the year. Halcyon by Ellie Goulding debuted this year but its peak position was not until two years later in 2014. Eighteen artists scored multiple entries in the top 10 in 2012. Carly Rae Jepsen, Emeli Sandé, Little Mix, Nicki Minaj and Rita Ora were among the many artists who achieved their first UK charting top 10 album in 2012.

+ by Ed Sheeran, returned to the top spot in the first week of 2012. The first new number-one album of the year was Born to Die by Lana Del Rey. Overall, thirty-five different albums peaked at number-one in 2012, with Bruno Mars and Rihanna (2) having the joint most albums hitting that position.

== Background ==
=== Multiple entries ===
One hundred and sixty-three albums charted in the top 10, with one hundred and forty-four albums reaching their peak this year (including All Over the World: The Very Best of Electric Light Orchestra, Number Ones, Sigh No More, Teenage Dream, The Seldom Seen Kid and Whitney: The Greatest Hits, which charted in previous years but reached a peak on their latest chart run).

In 2012 18 artists scored multiple entries in the top 10. Adele, Bruno Mars, Cheryl, Elbow, Electric Light Orchestra, Green Day, Military Wives, Mumford & Sons, Olly Murs, One Direction, Rihanna, The Vaccines and Whitney Houston were the acts who had two top 10 albums this year. Cheryl (one album with Girls Aloud as well as a solo release), Green Day and Military Wives' two entries were both released this year, with All Over the World: The Very Best of Electric Light Orchestra by Electric Light Orchestra, Sigh No More by Mumford & Sons, The Seldom Seen Kid by Elbow and Whitney: The Greatest Hits by Whitney Houston, all returning after making the top 10 before.

=== Chart debuts ===
Thirty-seven artists achieved their first top 10 album in 2012 as a lead artist.

The following table (collapsed on desktop site) does not include acts who had previously charted as part of a group and secured their first top 10 solo album, or featured appearances on compilations or other artists recordings.

Artist	Number of top 10s	First entry	Chart position	Other entries
The Maccabees	1	Given to the Wild	4	—
Lana Del Rey	1	Born to Die	1	—
Maverick Sabre	1	Lonely Are the Brave	2	—
Emeli Sandé	1	Our Version of Events	1	—
Gotye	1	Making Mirrors	4	—
Military Wives	1	In My Dreams	2	—
Michael Kiwanuka	1	Home Again	4	—
Marcus Collins	1	Marcus Collins	7	—
Nicki Minaj	1	Pink Friday: Roman Reloaded	1	—
Labrinth	1	Electronic Earth	2	—
Moshi Monsters	1	Music Rox!	4	—
Alabama Shakes	1	Boys & Girls	3	—
Ren Harvieu	1	Through the Night	5	—
John Mayer	1	Born and Raised	4	—
fun.	1	Some Nights	4	—
Frank Ocean	1	Channel Orange	2	—
Lianne La Havas	1	Is Your Love Big Enough?	4	—
Pnau	1	Good Morning to the Night	1	—
Nas	1	Life Is Good	8	—
The Gaslight Anthem	1	Handwritten	2	—
Conor Maynard	1	Contrast	1	—
Delilah	1	From the Roots Up	5	—
Rick Ross	1	God Forgives, I Don't	8	—
Ryan O'Shaughnessy	1	Ryan O'Shaughnessy (EP)	9	—
Jessie Ware	1	Devotion	5	—
The Black Keys	1	El Camino	6	—
Trey Songz	1	Chapter V	10	—
Rita Ora	1	Ora	1	—
Of Monsters and Men	1	My Head Is an Animal	3	—
Two Door Cinema Club	1	Beacon	2	—
Carly Rae Jepsen	1	Kiss	9	—
Jonathan and Charlotte	1	Together	5	—
Deadmau5	1	Album Title Goes Here	9	—
All Time Low	1	Don't Panic	9	—
Jake Bugg	1	Jake Bugg	1	—
Lawson	1	Chapman Square	4	—
Little Mix	1	DNA	3	—

Notes

Blunderbuss by Jack White was the singer's debut solo release, however he had previous chart success with The White Stripes and The Raconteurs. Dappy took some time away from his group N-Dubz, scoring a number 6 album Bad Intentions.

=== Best-selling albums ===
Emeli Sandé had the best-selling album of the year with Our Version of Events. The album spent 67 weeks in the top 10 (including 10 weeks at number 1), sold over 2.3 million copies and was certified 8× Platinum by the BPI. 21 by Adele came in second place. Ed Sheeran's +, Born to Die from Lana Del Rey and Take Me Home by One Direction made up the top five. Albums by Mumford & Sons, Olly Murs, Michael Bublé, Coldplay and Rihanna were also in the top 10 best-selling albums of the year.

== Top-ten albums ==
Key

Symbol	Meaning
‡	Album peaked in 2011 but still in chart in 2012.
♦	Album released in 2012 but peaked in 2013 or 2014.
(#)	Year-end top-ten album position and rank
Entered	The date that the album first appeared in the chart.
Peak	Highest position that the album reached in the UK Albums Chart.

Entered (week ending)	Weeks in top 10	Album	Artist	Peak	Peak reached (week ending)	Weeks at peak
Albums in 2011
29 January 2011	41	Doo-Wops & Hooligans ‡	Bruno Mars	1	29 January 2011	2
5 February 2011	76	21 ‡ (#2)	Adele	1	5 February 2011	23
12 March 2011	34	Who You Are ‡	Jessie J	2	12 March 2011	1
26 March 2011	4	What Did You Expect from The Vaccines? ‡	The Vaccines	4	26 March 2011	1
9 July 2011	11	4 ‡	Beyoncé	1	9 July 2011	2
10 September 2011	15	Nothing but the Beat ‡	David Guetta	2	10 September 2011	3
24 September 2011	49	+ ‡ (#3)	Ed Sheeran	1	24 September 2011	3
1 October 2011	4	Velociraptor! ‡	Kasabian	1	1 October 2011	1
29 October 2011	7	Noel Gallagher's High Flying Birds ‡	Noel Gallagher's High Flying Birds	1	29 October 2011	1
5 November 2011	28	Mylo Xyloto ‡ (#9)	Coldplay	1	5 November 2011	1
12 November 2011	7	Ceremonials ‡	Florence + The Machine	1	12 November 2011	1
12 November 2011	4	Stereo Typical	Rizzle Kicks	5	4 February 2012	1
3 December 2011	18	Talk That Talk ‡	Rihanna	1	3 December 2011	2
3 December 2011	7	Up All Night ‡	One Direction	2	3 December 2011	1
10 December 2011	9	In Case You Didn't Know ‡	Olly Murs	1	10 December 2011	1
17 December 2011	6	Lioness: Hidden Treasures ‡	Amy Winehouse	1	17 December 2011	1
17 December 2011	9	Heaven ‡	Rebecca Ferguson	3	17 December 2011	1
Albums in 2012
21 January 2012	1	Given to the Wild	The Maccabees	4	21 January 2012	1
28 January 2012	1	A Flash Flood of Colour	Enter Shikari	4	28 January 2012	1
4 February 2012	1	Beyond the Sun	Chris Isaak	6	4 February 2012	1
11 February 2012	15	Born to Die (#4)	Lana Del Rey	1	11 February 2012	2
11 February 2012	2	Old Ideas	Leonard Cohen	2	11 February 2012	1
18 February 2012	3	Lonely Are the Brave	Maverick Sabre	2	18 February 2012	1
18 February 2012	1	Kisses on the Bottom	Paul McCartney	3	18 February 2012	1
18 February 2012	1	A Different Kind of Truth	Van Halen	6	18 February 2012	1
25 February 2012	67	Our Version of Events (#1)	Emeli Sandé	1	25 February 2012	10
25 February 2012	6	Making Mirrors	Gotye	4	25 February 2012	1
25 February 2012	1	Whitney: The Greatest Hits	Whitney Houston	7	25 February 2012	1
25 February 2012	3	19	Adele	7	3 March 2012	1
10 March 2012	1	Hell in a Handbasket	Meat Loaf	5	10 March 2012	1
10 March 2012	1	The Essential Whitney Houston	Whitney Houston	7	10 March 2012	1
17 March 2012	3	Wrecking Ball	Bruce Springsteen	1	17 March 2012	1
17 March 2012	3	In My Dreams	Military Wives	1	24 March 2012	1
17 March 2012	2	Tuskegee	Lionel Richie	7	17 March 2012	1
17 March 2012	1	Secret Symphony	Katie Melua	8	17 March 2012	1
24 March 2012	2	Home Again	Michael Kiwanuka	4	24 March 2012	1
24 March 2012	1	Marcus Collins	Marcus Collins	7	24 March 2012	1
31 March 2012	2	Sonik Kicks	Paul Weller	1	31 March 2012	1
7 April 2012	2	MDNA	Madonna	1	7 April 2012	1
7 April 2012	1	Teenage Dream	Katy Perry	6	7 April 2012	1
14 April 2012	5	Pink Friday: Roman Reloaded	Nicki Minaj	1	14 April 2012	1
14 April 2012	2	Electronic Earth	Labrinth	2	14 April 2012	1
14 April 2012	2	Music Rox!	Moshi Monsters	4	14 April 2012	1
14 April 2012	1	Weapons	Lostprophets	9	14 April 2012	1
21 April 2012	4	Boys & Girls	Alabama Shakes	3	21 April 2012	1
28 April 2012	1	Love Is a Four Letter Word	Jason Mraz	2	28 April 2012	1
28 April 2012	3	California 37	Train	7	18 August 2012	1
5 May 2012	3	Blunderbuss	Jack White	1	5 May 2012	1
5 May 2012	1	Out of the Game	Rufus Wainwright	5	5 May 2012	1
12 May 2012	1	Electra Heart	Marina and the Diamonds	1	12 May 2012	1
12 May 2012	1	...Little Broken Hearts	Norah Jones	4	12 May 2012	1
19 May 2012	4	Strangeland	Keane	1	19 May 2012	2
19 May 2012	1	Standing at the Sky's Edge	Richard Hawley	3	19 May 2012	1
19 May 2012	1	In the Belly of the Brazen Bull	The Cribs	9	19 May 2012	1
26 May 2012	1	Rize of the Fenix	Tenacious D	2	26 May 2012	1
26 May 2012	1	Through the Night	Ren Harvieu	5	26 May 2012	1
26 May 2012	2	Every Kingdom	Ben Howard	6	26 May 2012	1
26 May 2012	1	Not Your Kind of People	Garbage	9	26 May 2012	1
2 June 2012	1	Driving Towards the Daylight	Joe Bonamassa	2	2 June 2012	1
2 June 2012	1	Born and Raised	John Mayer	4	2 June 2012	1
2 June 2012	5	Number Ones	Bee Gees	4	16 June 2012	1
2 June 2012	5	Some Nights	fun.	4	10 November 2012	1
2 June 2012	1	Spirit in the Room	Tom Jones	8	2 June 2012	1
2 June 2012	1	Streets in the Sky	The Enemy	9	2 June 2012	1
9 June 2012	4	Sing	Gary Barlow	1	9 June 2012	3
9 June 2012	15	Fall to Grace	Paloma Faith	2	9 June 2012	3
9 June 2012	2	Boys Don't Cry	Rumer	3	9 June 2012	1
9 June 2012	1	Magic Hour	Scissor Sisters	4	9 June 2012	1
9 June 2012	1	Anthems – Music To Inspire A Nation	Russell Watson	5	9 June 2012	1
9 June 2012	1	Valtari	Sigur Rós	8	9 June 2012	1
16 June 2012	5	Graceland	Paul Simon	4	28 July 2012	1
23 June 2012	3	Life in a Beautiful Light	Amy Macdonald	2	23 June 2012	1
23 June 2012	2	Looking 4 Myself	Usher	3	23 June 2012	1
23 June 2012	1	25 Years – The Chain	Fleetwood Mac	9	23 June 2012	1
30 June 2012	2	Believe	Justin Bieber	1	30 June 2012	1
30 June 2012	2	A Million Lights	Cheryl	2	30 June 2012	1
7 July 2012	2	Living Things	Linkin Park	1	7 July 2012	1
7 July 2012	9	Overexposed	Maroon 5	2	7 July 2012	3
7 July 2012	1	Wild Ones	Flo Rida	8	7 July 2012	1
14 July 2012	2	Fortune	Chris Brown	1	14 July 2012	1
21 July 2012	1	Write It on Your Skin	Newton Faulkner	1	21 July 2012	1
21 July 2012	2	Channel Orange	Frank Ocean	2	21 July 2012	1
21 July 2012	1	Is Your Love Big Enough?	Lianne La Havas	4	21 July 2012	1
21 July 2012	1	Cheeky for a Reason	The View	9	21 July 2012	1
28 July 2012	2	Good Morning to the Night	Elton John vs. Pnau	1	28 July 2012	1
28 July 2012	1	Life Is Good	Nas	8	28 July 2012	1
4 August 2012	7	Ill Manors	Plan B	1	4 August 2012	1
4 August 2012	1	Handwritten	The Gaslight Anthem	2	4 August 2012	1
4 August 2012	1	Dance Again... the Hits	Jennifer Lopez	4	4 August 2012	1
4 August 2012	1	The Soul Sessions Vol. 2	Joss Stone	6	4 August 2012	1
11 August 2012	2	Contrast	Conor Maynard	1	11 August 2012	1
11 August 2012	1	From the Roots Up	Delilah	5	11 August 2012	1
11 August 2012	1	Two Sides: The Very Best of Mike Oldfield	Mike Oldfield	6	11 August 2012	1
11 August 2012	1	God Forgives, I Don't	Rick Ross	8	11 August 2012	1
25 August 2012	1	The Seldom Seen Kid	Elbow	6	25 August 2012	1
25 August 2012	1	Ryan O'Shaughnessy (EP)	Ryan O'Shaughnessy	9	25 August 2012	1
1 September 2012	1	Four	Bloc Party	3	1 September 2012	1
1 September 2012	1	Hot Cakes	The Darkness	4	1 September 2012	1
1 September 2012	1	Devotion	Jessie Ware	5	1 September 2012	1
1 September 2012	2	El Camino	The Black Keys	6	8 September 2012	1
1 September 2012	1	Chapter V	Trey Songz	10	1 September 2012	1
8 September 2012	4	Ora	Rita Ora	1	8 September 2012	1
8 September 2012	2	My Head Is an Animal	Of Monsters and Men	3	8 September 2012	1
8 September 2012	1	Dead in the Boot	Elbow	4	8 September 2012	1
15 September 2012	2	Come of Age	The Vaccines	1	15 September 2012	1
15 September 2012	2	Beacon	Two Door Cinema Club	2	15 September 2012	1
15 September 2012	1	Fires	Ronan Keating	5	15 September 2012	1
15 September 2012	1	Privateering	Mark Knopfler	8	15 September 2012	1
15 September 2012	1	The Light Between Us	Scouting for Girls	10	15 September 2012	1
22 September 2012	3	Coexist	The xx	1	22 September 2012	1
22 September 2012	4	#3	The Script	2	22 September 2012	1
22 September 2012	2	Tempest	Bob Dylan	3	22 September 2012	1
22 September 2012	1	Here's What I Believe	Joe McElderry	8	22 September 2012	1
22 September 2012	1	Elysium	Pet Shop Boys	9	22 September 2012	1
29 September 2012	4	Battle Born	The Killers	1	29 September 2012	1
29 September 2012	17	The Truth About Love	Pink	2	29 September 2012	1
29 September 2012	1	Bad 25	Michael Jackson	6	29 September 2012	1
29 September 2012	1	Kiss	Carly Rae Jepsen	9	29 September 2012	1
6 October 2012	16	Babel (#6)	Mumford & Sons	1	6 October 2012	3
6 October 2012	2	¡Uno!	Green Day	2	6 October 2012	1
6 October 2012	2	Together	Jonathan and Charlotte	5	6 October 2012	1
6 October 2012	1	Album Title Goes Here	Deadmau5	9	6 October 2012	1
6 October 2012	1	Sigh No More	Mumford & Sons	10	6 October 2012	1
13 October 2012	4	The 2nd Law	Muse	1	13 October 2012	1
13 October 2012	1	Higher	The Overtones	6	13 October 2012	1
13 October 2012	2	All Over the World: The Very Best of Electric Light Orchestra	Electric Light Orchestra	10	13 October 2012	2
20 October 2012	22	Halcyon ♦	Ellie Goulding	1	11 January 2014	3
20 October 2012	1	Long Wave	Jeff Lynne	7	20 October 2012	1
20 October 2012	1	Mr. Blue Sky: The Very Best of Electric Light Orchestra	Electric Light Orchestra	8	20 October 2012	1
20 October 2012	1	Don't Panic	All Time Low	9	20 October 2012	1
27 October 2012	16	Jake Bugg	Jake Bugg	1	27 October 2012	1
27 October 2012	2	Glassheart	Leona Lewis	3	27 October 2012	1
27 October 2012	1	The Haunted Man	Bat for Lashes	6	27 October 2012	1
27 October 2012	1	The Singer	Art Garfunkel	10	27 October 2012	1
3 November 2012	4	Red	Taylor Swift	1	3 November 2012	1
3 November 2012	1	Chapman Square	Lawson	4	3 November 2012	1
3 November 2012	1	Bad Intentions	Dappy	6	3 November 2012	1
3 November 2012	1	Songs from the Movies and More	Daniel O'Donnell	7	3 November 2012	1
10 November 2012	15	18 Months	Calvin Harris	1	10 November 2012	2
10 November 2012	2	The Abbey Road Sessions	Kylie Minogue	2	10 November 2012	1
10 November 2012	1	American Soul	Mick Hucknall	6	10 November 2012	1
10 November 2012	1	The Fire	Matt Cardle	8	10 November 2012	1
10 November 2012	1	Oui Oui, Si Si, Ja Ja, Da Da	Madness	10	10 November 2012	1
17 November 2012	10	Take the Crown	Robbie Williams	1	17 November 2012	1
17 November 2012	5	Magic of the Movies	André Rieu & The Johann Strauss Orchestra	2	17 November 2012	1
17 November 2012	1	Evolution	JLS	3	17 November 2012	1
17 November 2012	1	Stronger Together	Military Wives	5	17 November 2012	1
17 November 2012	1	Opera	Andrea Bocelli	10	17 November 2012	1
24 November 2012	10	Take Me Home (#5)	One Direction	1	24 November 2012	1
24 November 2012	6	Merry Christmas, Baby	Rod Stewart	2	24 November 2012	1
24 November 2012	1	GRRR!	The Rolling Stones	3	24 November 2012	1
24 November 2012	2	Storyteller	Alfie Boe	6	24 November 2012	1
24 November 2012	1	¡Dos!	Green Day	10	24 November 2012	1
1 December 2012	14	Unapologetic (#10)	Rihanna	1	1 December 2012	1
1 December 2012	1	DNA	Little Mix	3	1 December 2012	1
1 December 2012	1	Celebration Day	Led Zeppelin	4	1 December 2012	1
1 December 2012	6	Christmas (#8)	Michael Bublé	2	15 December 2012	1
1 December 2012	1	Standing Ovation: The Greatest Songs from the Stage	Susan Boyle	7	1 December 2012	1
8 December 2012	16	Right Place Right Time (#7)	Olly Murs	1	8 December 2012	2
8 December 2012	5	The Very Best of Neil Diamond: The Original Studio Recordings	Neil Diamond	5	15 December 2012	2
8 December 2012	1	Ten	Girls Aloud	9	8 December 2012	1
22 December 2012	24	Unorthodox Jukebox	Bruno Mars	1	22 December 2012	1

== Entries by artist ==
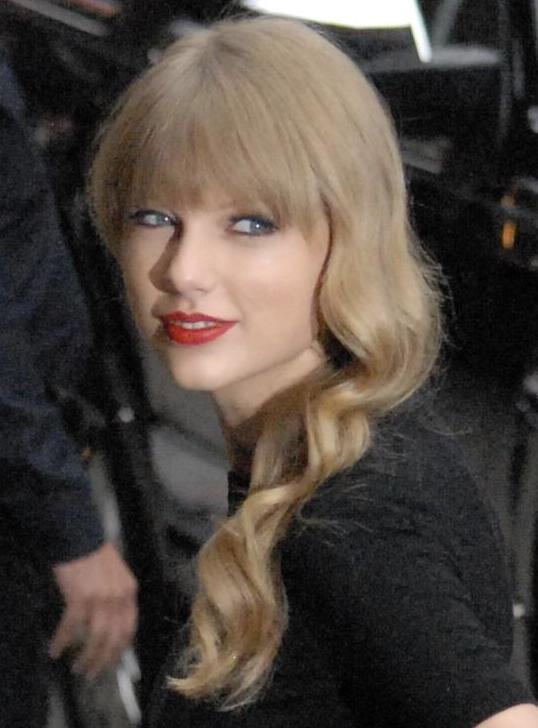
Taylor Swift scored her first UK number-one album in 2012 with Red.

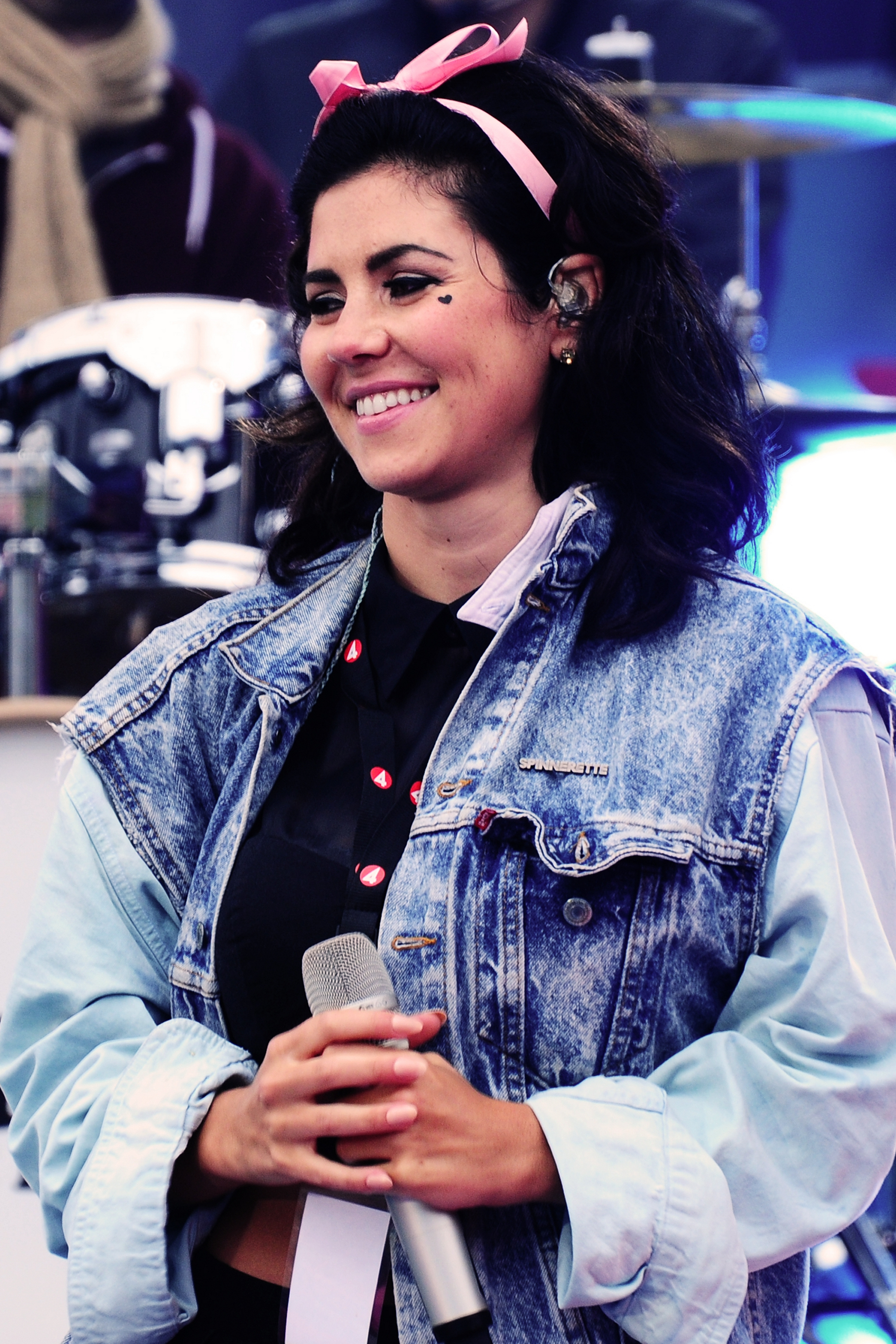
Marina and the Diamonds reached number-one in the UK in May of this year with her album Electra Heart.

The following table shows artists who achieved two or more top 10 entries in 2012, including albums that reached their peak in 2011. The figures only include main artists, with featured artists and appearances on compilation albums not counted individually for each artist. The total number of weeks an artist spent in the top 10 in 2011 is also shown.

Entries	Artist	Weeks	Albums
2	Adele	28	19, 21
2	Bruno Mars	8	Doo-Wops & Hooligans, Unorthodox Jukebox
2	Cheryl	3	A Million Lights, Ten
2	Elbow	2	Dead in the Boot, The Seldom Seen Kid
2	Electric Light Orchestra	3	All Over the World: The Very Best of Electric Light Orchestra, Mr. Blue Sky: The Very Best of Electric Light Orchestra
2	Green Day	3	¡Dos!, ¡Uno!
2	Military Wives	4	In My Dreams, Stronger Together
2	Mumford & Sons	8	Babel, Sigh No More
2	Olly Murs	9	In Case You Didn't Know, Right Place Right Time
2	One Direction	8	Take Me Home, Up All Night
2	Rihanna	18	Talk That Talk, Unapologetic
2	The Vaccines	5	Come of Age, What Did You Expect from The Vaccines?
2	Whitney Houston	2	The Essential Whitney Houston, Whitney: The Greatest Hits

== Notes ==
- Doo-Wops & Hooligans re-entered the top 10 at number 2 on 7 January 2012 (week ending) for six weeks.
- 21 re-entered the top 10 at number 9 on 14 July 2012 (week ending) and at number 7 on 27 July 2012 (week ending) for four weeks.
- Who You Are re-entered the top 10 at number 10 on 7 January 2012 (week ending) for two weeks, at number 10 on 28 January 2012 (week ending) for six weeks, at number 5 on 7 April 2012 (week ending) for six weeks, at number 7 on 16 June 2012 (week ending) and at number 7 on 25 August 2012 (week ending).
- What Did You Expect from the Vaccines re-entered the top 10 at number 6 on 21 January 2012 (week ending) for three weeks.
- 4 re-entered the top 10 at number 6 on 14 January 2012 (week ending) for three weeks.
- Nothing but the Beat re-entered the top 10 at number 9 on 11 February 2012 (week ending) for two weeks and at number 9 on 24 March 2012 (week ending) for seven weeks.
- + re-entered the top 10 at number 8 on 26 May 2012 (week ending) and at number 2 on 16 June 2012 (week ending) for 13 weeks.
- Every Kingdom originally peaked at number 7 upon release in 2011. It re-entered the top 10 at number 6 on 26 May 2012 (week ending) for two weeks. It also re-entered the top 10 at number 4 on 2 March 2013 (week ending) for two weeks, reaching a new peak.
- Mylo Xyloto re-entered the top 10 at number 6 on 3 March 2012 (week ending) for three weeks, at number 7 on 31 March 2012 (week ending) for two weeks, at number 5 on 16 June 2012 (week ending), at number 7 on 14 July 2012 (week ending) for two weeks and at number 4 on 22 September 2012 (week ending) for two weeks.
- Noel Gallagher's High Flying Birds re-entered the top 10 at number 8 on 21 January 2012 (week ending) and at number 9 on 4 February 2012 (week ending) for two weeks.
- Velociraptor! re-entered the top 10 at number 9 on 21 January 2012 (week ending).
- Ceremonials re-entered the top 10 at number 8 on 28 January 2012 (week ending) for two weeks and at number 9 on 3 March 2012 (week ending) for two weeks.
- Stereo Typical re-entered the top 10 at number 9 on 28 January 2012 (week ending) for three weeks.
- Talk That Talk re-entered the top 10 at number 9 on 9 June 2012 (week ending) for ? weeks, at number 9 on 7 July 2012 (week ending) for two weeks, at number 6 on 28 July 2012 (week ending) for seven weeks.
- Up All Night re-entered the top 10 at number 10 on 25 August 2012 (week ending).
- In Case You Didn't Know re-entered the top 10 at number 7 on 5 May 2012 (week ending) for two weeks.
- Heaven re-entered the top 10 at number 10 on 25 February 2012 (week ending), at number 6 on 19 May 2012 (week ending) for two weeks and at number 5 on 27 October 2012.
- Born to Die re-entered the top 10 at number 6 on 21 April 2012 (week ending) for five weeks and at number 8 on 24 November 2012 (week ending).
- Our Version of Events re-entered the top 10 at number 10 on 8 June 2013 (week ending).
- Making Mirrors re-entered the top 10 at number 8 on 19 May 2012 (week ending) for two weeks.
- Whitney: The Greatest Hits originally peaked at number 1 upon its initial release in 2000. It re-entered the top 10 following the death of Whitney Houston.
- 19 originally peaked at number 1 upon its initial release in 2008. It re-entered the top 10 at number 9 on 25 February 2012 (week ending) for three weeks.
- Teenage Dream re-entered the top 10 at number 6 on 7 April 2012 (week ending), having originally peaked at number-one upon release in 2010.
- California 36 re-entered the top 10 at number 9 on 28 July 2012 (week ending) and at number 7 on 18 August 2012 (week ending).
- Strangeland re-entered the top 10 at number 10 on 18 August 2012 (week ending).
- Some Nights re-entered the top 10 at number 8 on 8 September 2012 (week ending), at number 4 on 10 November 2012 (week ending), at number 10 on 12 January 2013 (week ending) and at number 9 on 2 February 2013 (week ending).
- Number Ones (Bee Gees) originally peaked at number 7 upon its initial release in 2004.
- Fall to Grace re-entered the top 10 at number 5 on 18 August 2012 (week ending) for five weeks, at number 9 on 3 November 2012 (week ending) for three weeks, at number 9 on 26 January 2013 (week ending) and at number 10 on 2 March 2013 (week ending).
- Graceland originally peaked at number-one upon its initial release in 1986. It re-entered the top 10 at number 6 on 14 July 2012 (week ending) for three weeks.
- Life in a Beautiful Light re-entered the top 10 at number 4 on 25 August 2012 (week ending).
- Watch the Throne re-entered the top 10 at number 7 on 7 July 2012 (week ending) for two weeks.
- ill Manors re-entered the top 10 at number 7 on 8 September 2012 (week ending) for four weeks.
- The Seldom Seen Kid originally peaked at number 5 upon its initial release in 2008.
- Ora re-entered the top 10 at number 8 on 5 January 2013 (week ending) for two weeks.
- The Truth About Love re-entered the top 10 at number 10 on 22 December 2012 (week ending) for two weeks and at number 10 on 16 March 2013 (week ending) for 10 weeks.
- Babel re-entered the top 10 at number 5 on 23 February 2013 (week ending) for five weeks and at number 1 on 13 July 2013 (week ending) for four weeks.
- Sigh No More first entered the top 10 in 2010 and reached its peak of number two in 2011. It re-entered the top 10 at number 10 on 6 October 2012 (week ending), the same week Babel debuted at number 1.
- All Over the World: The Very Best of Electric Light Orchestra originally peaked at number 6 upon its initial release in 2005.
- Halcyon re-entered the top 10 at number 10 on 9 February 2013 (week ending), at number 9 on 8 June 2013 (week ending), at number 3 on 7 September 2013 (week ending) for two weeks, at number 6 on 28 December 2013 (week ending) for 13 weeks, at number 10 on 26 July 2014 (week ending) for two weeks and at number 7 on 16 August 2014 (week ending).
- Jake Bugg re-entered the top 10 at number 4 on 13 January 2013 (week ending) for nine weeks and at number 5 on 6 July 2013 (week ending) for five weeks.
- Red re-entered the top 10 at number 8 on 19 January 2013 (week ending) and at number 7 on 2 March 2013 (week ending).
- 18 Months re-entered the top 10 at number 7 on 5 January 2013 (week ending) for seven weeks, at number 8 on 4 May 2013 (week ending) for two weeks, at number 8 on 27 July 2012 (week ending) and at number 8 on 24 August 2013 (week ending) for two weeks.
- Take Me Home re-entered the top 10 at number 8 on 2 February 2013 (week ending).
- Storyteller re-entered the top 10 at number 9 on 15 December 2012 (week ending).
- Unapologetic re-entered the top 10 at number 10 on 13 April 2013 (week ending).
- Christmas (Michael Buble) originally peaked at number 1 upon its initial release in 2011. It re-entered the top 10 at number 5 on 1 December 2012 (week ending) for six weeks.
- Right Place Right Time re-entered the top 10 at number 7 on 16 March 2013 (week ending), at number 9 on 15 June 2013 (week ending), at number 8 on 29 June 2013 (week ending) for three weeks and at number 4 on 7 December 2013 (week ending) for five weeks.
- Unorthodox Jukebox re-entered the top 10 at number 7 on 23 February 2013 (week ending) for 12 weeks, at number 7 on 8 June 2013 (week ending) and at number 9 on 6 July 2013 (week ending) for four weeks.
- Figure includes a top 10 album with the group Girls Aloud.
- Figure includes album that peaked in 2011.

== See also ==
- 2012 in British music
- List of number-one albums from the 2010s (UK)
