= List of The Official Big Top 40 Christmas number ones =

In the United Kingdom, Christmas number ones are singles that are top of a chart in the week in which Christmas Day falls. The singles have often been novelty songs, charity songs or songs with a Christmas theme. Historically, the volume of record sales in the UK has peaked at Christmas. The Christmas number one is considered especially prestigious, more so than any other time of year. Christmas number one singles have often also been the best-selling song of the year, though in recent years, the accolade has gone to reality television contestants and charity efforts. Due to the common practice of dating a chart by the date on which the week ends, the Christmas chart is dated the end of the week containing 25 December. The most recent Christmas number one single on The Official Big Top 40 is "I Wish It Could Be Christmas Everyday" by Creator Universe.

The Official Big Top 40 from Global is a radio chart show broadcast every Sunday from 4 to 7pm on Global's Capital and Heart networks, presented by Will Manning. The show started on 14 June 2009. The chart is compiled based on iTunes sales, Apple Music streams, and radio airplay from the stations that broadcast the show.

== The Official Big Top 40 Christmas Number 1s ==
Year	Artist	Song	Weeks at No. 1
2009	Rage Against the Machine	“Killing in the Name”	1
2010	Matt Cardle	“When We Collide”	2
2011	Military Wives, Gareth Malone and London Metropolitan Orchestra	“Wherever You Are”	2
2012	The Justice Collective	“He Ain't Heavy, He's My Brother”	1
2013	Pharrell Williams	“Happy”	2
2014	Mark Ronson ft. Bruno Mars	“Uptown Funk”	7
2015	Justin Bieber	“Love Yourself”	6
2016	Clean Bandit ft. Sean Paul and Anne-Marie	“Rockabye”	7
2017	Eminem ft. Ed Sheeran	“River”	3
2018	LadBaby	“We Built This City”	1
2019	LadBaby	“I Love Sausage Rolls”	2
2020	LadBaby	“Don't Stop Me Eatin'”	1
2021	Ed Sheeran and Elton John	“Merry Christmas”	3
2022	Sidemen	“Christmas Drillings”	1
2023	Creator Universe	“I Wish It Could Be Christmas Everyday”	2
