= Royal Citadel, Plymouth =

Fort in Plymouth, Devon, England

Royal Citadel
- Citadel
- Plymouth, Devon in England
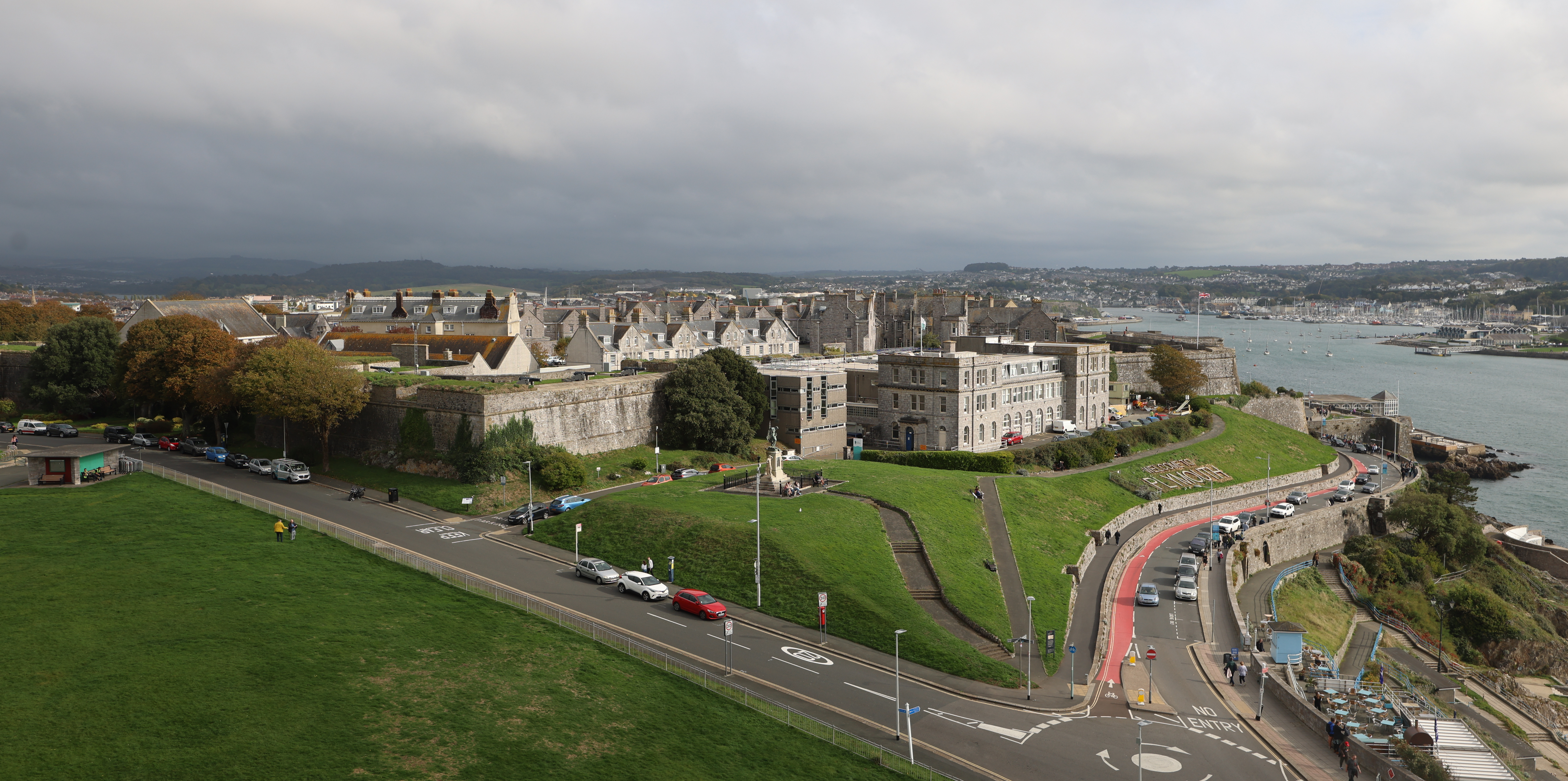
- The western view of the Citadel from the balcony of Smeaton's Tower

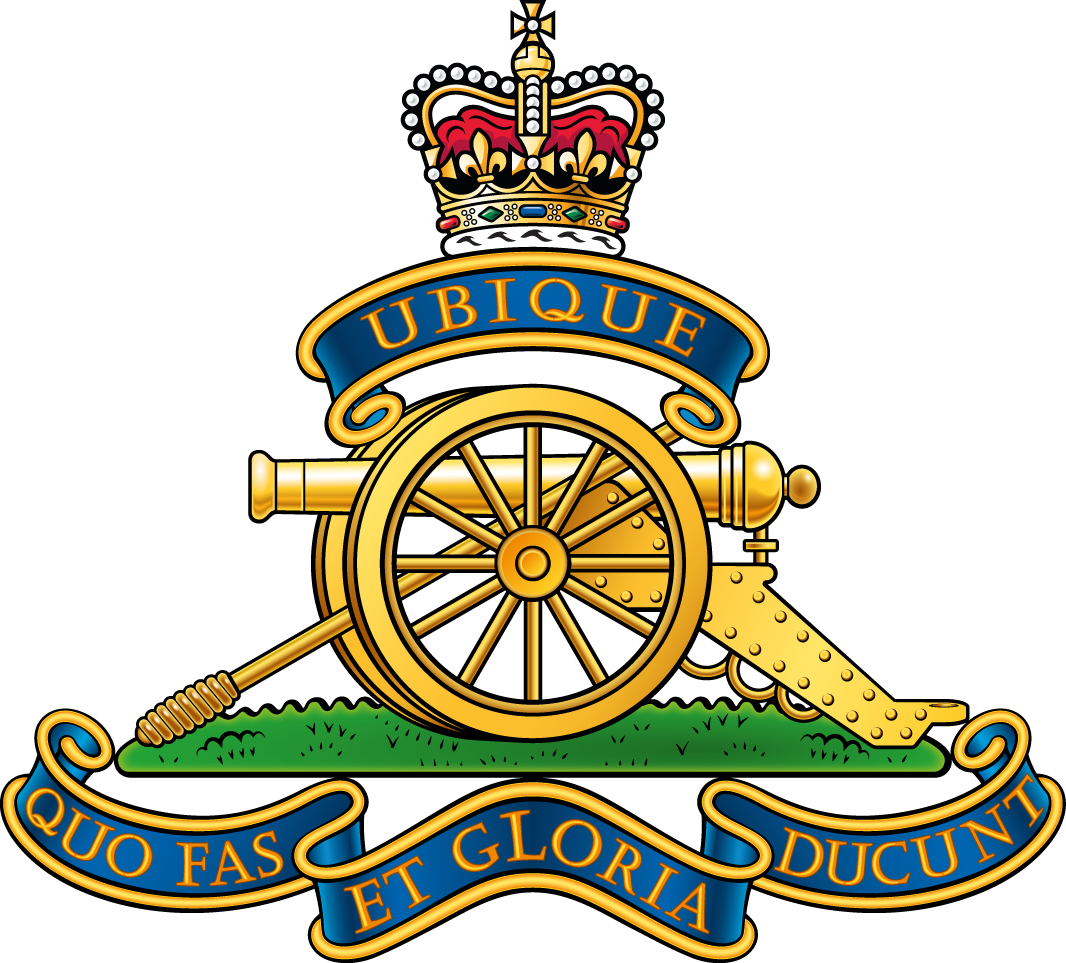
- Cap badge of the Royal Artillery

Site information
- Type: Fortress, Military base
- Owner: Crown Estate
- Operator: Royal Navy
- Controlled by: 29 Commando Regiment Royal Artillery
- Open to the public: Yes
- Website: Official website

Location
- Location in Devon Royal Citadel (the United Kingdom)
- Coordinates: 50°21′53″N 4°08′15″W

Site history
- Built: 1592–1598; 1665–1675 (Second fortification)
- In use: 1598–present
- Materials: Limestone and granite
- Events: Dutch Wars; World War II

Garrison information
- Current commander: Lt Col Mark Dornan
- Garrison: 29 Commando Regiment Royal Artillery
- Occupants: 8 (Alma) Commando Battery Royal Artillery; 23 (Gibraltar 1779–1783) Commando Battery Royal Artillery; 79 (Kirkee) Commando Battery Royal Artillery; 29 Commando Regiment Workshop REME

The Royal Citadel in Plymouth, Devon, England, was built in the late 1660s to the design of Sir Bernard de Gomme. It is at the eastern end of Plymouth Hoe overlooking Plymouth Sound, and encompasses the site of the earlier fort that had been built in the time of Sir Francis Drake. The citadel site is a Scheduled Monument and many of the buildings within are Grade II Listed.

== History ==
=== Drake's Fort ===
In 1590, Sir Francis Drake was appointed to improve the defences of Plymouth. After setting up some temporary artillery batteries, Drake petitioned the Privy Council for the funds to build a fort on Plymouth Hoe that could dominate the Cattewater, the approach to Sutton Harbour, which at that time was the main port at Plymouth. By May 1592, Elizabeth I had decided that the fort could be funded by a tax on every hogshead of pilchards which was exported from Plymouth. Construction of the fort dragged on until 1596 and was only finished after the government had drafted in a further 500 labourers. The northern landward side of the fort was protected by two bastions and it enclosed the previously established batteries overlooking the Cattewater, and also the Fisher's Nose Blockhouse, located on its south east corner, which dates from about 1540. A further blockhouse called Queen Elizabeth's Tower was built a short distance to the west of Fisher's Nose.

=== Design and construction of the Citadel ===
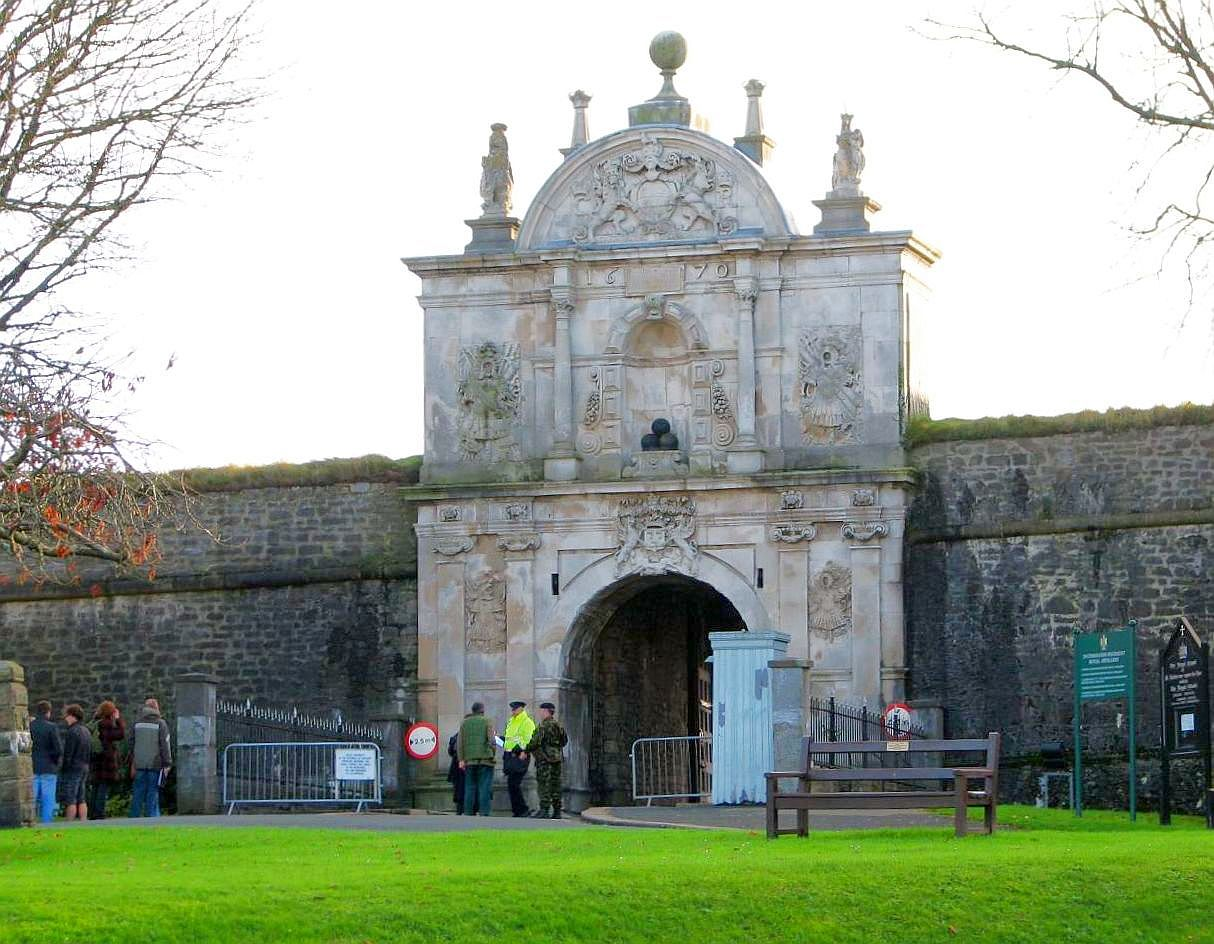
The Baroque main gate of the Royal Citadel. Note the date 1670 above the arch

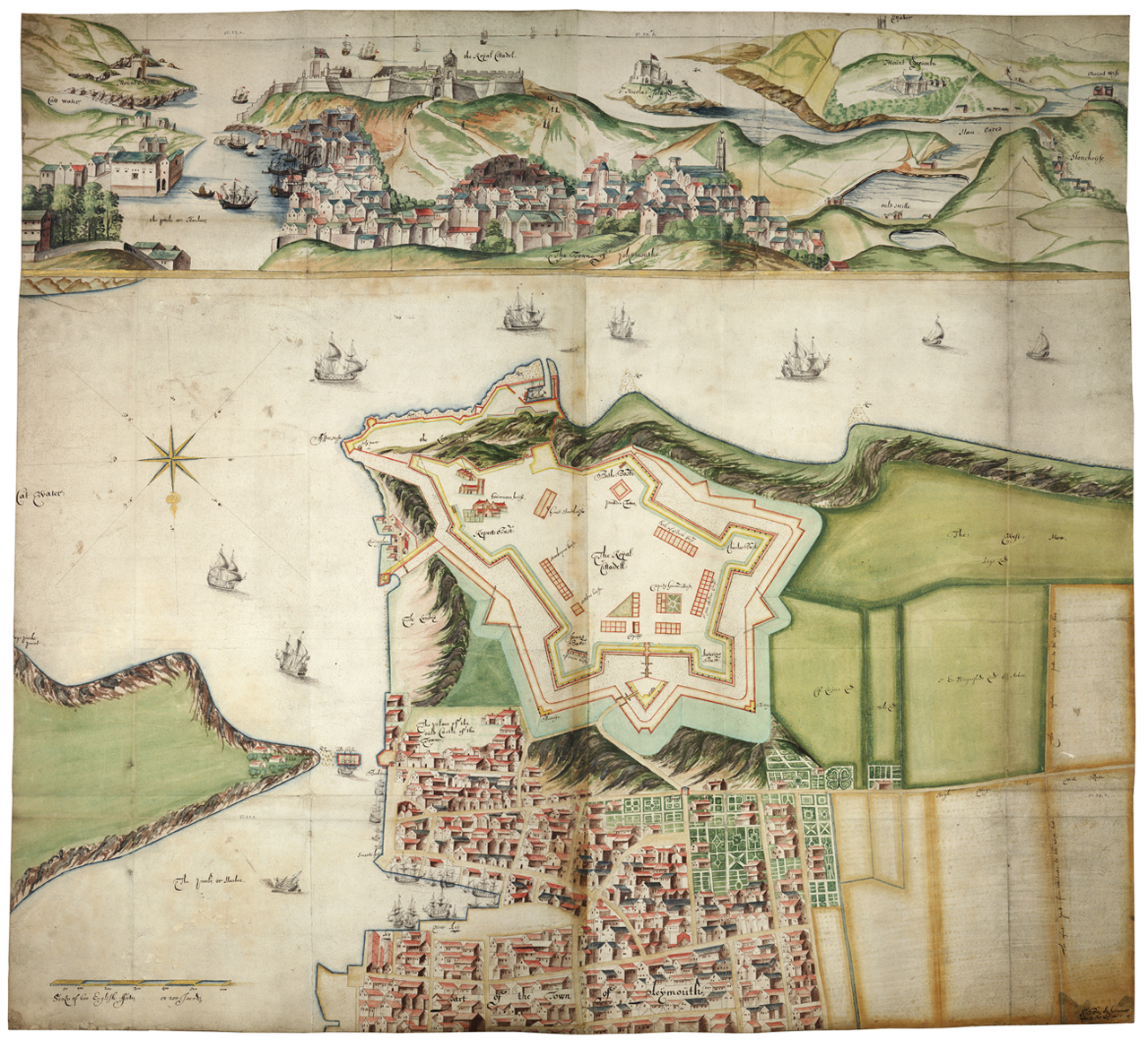
De Gomme's original designs for the Royal Citadel

During the Dutch Wars of 1664–67 King Charles II decided that it was necessary to realise the importance of Plymouth as a channel port. The original plan was to build a regular self-contained fort with five bastions, to the west of Drake's Fort, but this was revised to take in the earlier fort, resulting in the Citadel's irregular outline. Possibly due to Plymouth's support for the Parliamentarians in the Civil War its guns could also fire on the town. De Gomme faced some criticism over his unorthodox design: for instance when Samuel Pepys visited in 1683 he wrote that "De Gomme hath built very sillily".

Work began in March 1665, but it was not until 18 July 1666 that the foundation stone was laid by John Granville, 1st Earl of Bath. This stone, inscribed 'Jo Earle of Bathe 1666', is still in the wall facing the Hoe. Elements from the earlier Tudor fort were incorporated into the new work. The Citadel is built of local limestone, while the English Baroque gateway, designed by Sir Thomas Fitz, is of Portland stone. The gateway was originally approached by a drawbridge over a dry moat, but these were removed with all the other outworks in the 1880s. On the opposite bank to Fisher's Nose is the Queen Anne's Battery, dating from 1667.

=== Later use ===
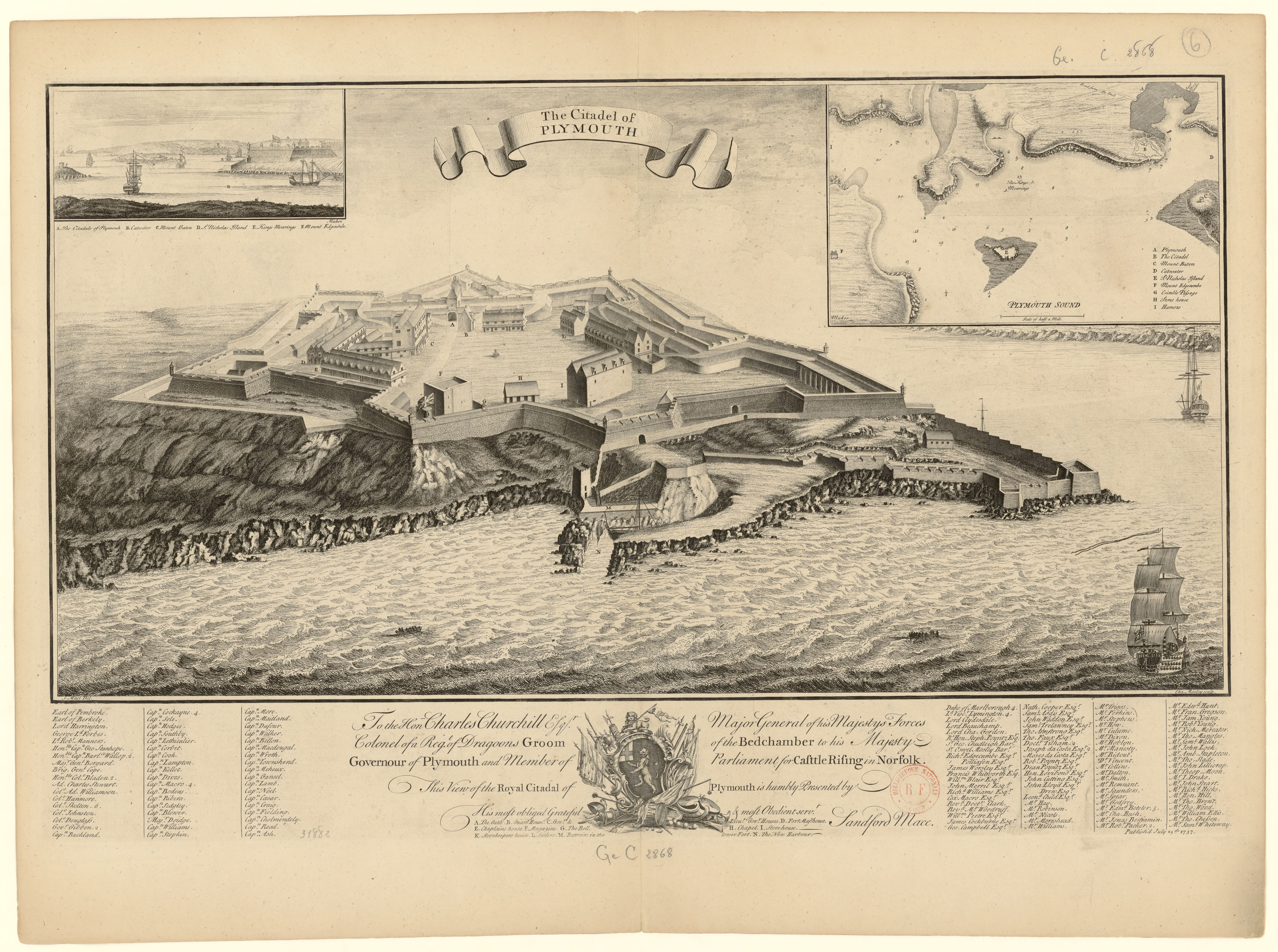
The Citadel in 1737

The Royal Citadel was the most important English defence for over 100 years, with 70-foot-high (21 m) walls, and was regularly strengthened over the years, particularly during the 1750s when it was equipped with 113 guns. In 1860, the Royal Commission on the Defence of the United Kingdom recommended the construction of a new ring of forts to defend Plymouth from a greater distance, the "Palmerston Forts"; however, the Citadel was still judged to be '...a valuable support to the works on the right of the "North-Eastern Defences".' During the later Victorian period the Citadel was being used by the Royal Garrison Artillery for instruction.

During the Second World War, the Citadel was used as the headquarters of the Coast Artillery Training Centre, Plymouth. After the war, the Coast Artillery School moved there from Great Orme, and the two institutions merged with the one remaining regular coast artillery regiment (47th Coast Regiment), which relocated to Plymouth from Dover to provide a depot establishment for the new Training Centre; training of recruits and others continued until the Coast Artillery was disbanded in 1956.

The Royal Citadel is still occupied by the military, being the base of 29 Commando Regiment of the Royal Artillery. This specialist British Army unit provides artillery support to the UK Commando Force. Guided tours are sometimes available.

Immediately to the east of the Citadel, and contemporary with it, a Royal Navy Victualling Yard was established to serve the fleet in Plymouth Sound and Sutton Pool. This closed with the establishment of the Royal William Victualling Yard in the 1830s, since when the area has been used as an extension to the military base (and accommodates vehicles too large to pass through the seventeenth-century gateway).

== Based units ==
The following notable units are based at Royal Citadel.

=== British Army ===
Royal Artillery

- UK Commando Force
  - 29th Commando Regiment

== Future ==
A Better Defence Estate, published in November 2016, indicates that the Ministry of Defence will dispose of the Royal Citadel by 2024. This was later extended to 2036.

== Garrison church ==
The Royal Chapel of St Katherine-upon-the-Hoe was originally licensed for services in 1371. During the period 1666–1671, the original church was demolished and the present nave, chancel and sanctuary were rebuilt on the same site. The galleries and transepts were added in 1845 and give a cross-like structure to the building. King George V re-granted the title Royal Chapel in 1927 during a visit to the Royal Citadel.

== Royal Citadel in the media ==
The 2011 BBC television series The Choir: Military Wives featured the Royal Citadel along with RMB Chivenor in Devon. The programme documented choirmaster Gareth Malone forming a choir of wives and partners of Royal Citadel personnel deployed on active service in the Afghanistan War. In forming a choir, Malone aimed to raise the women's morale and raise their profile in the public perception. The song "Wherever You Are" was recorded by the Military Wives Choir and was the Christmas number one in 2011, with proceeds going to the Royal British Legion and SSAFA Forces Help.

== Visitor access ==
Access to the Royal Citadel is by guided tour only.

== Gallery ==
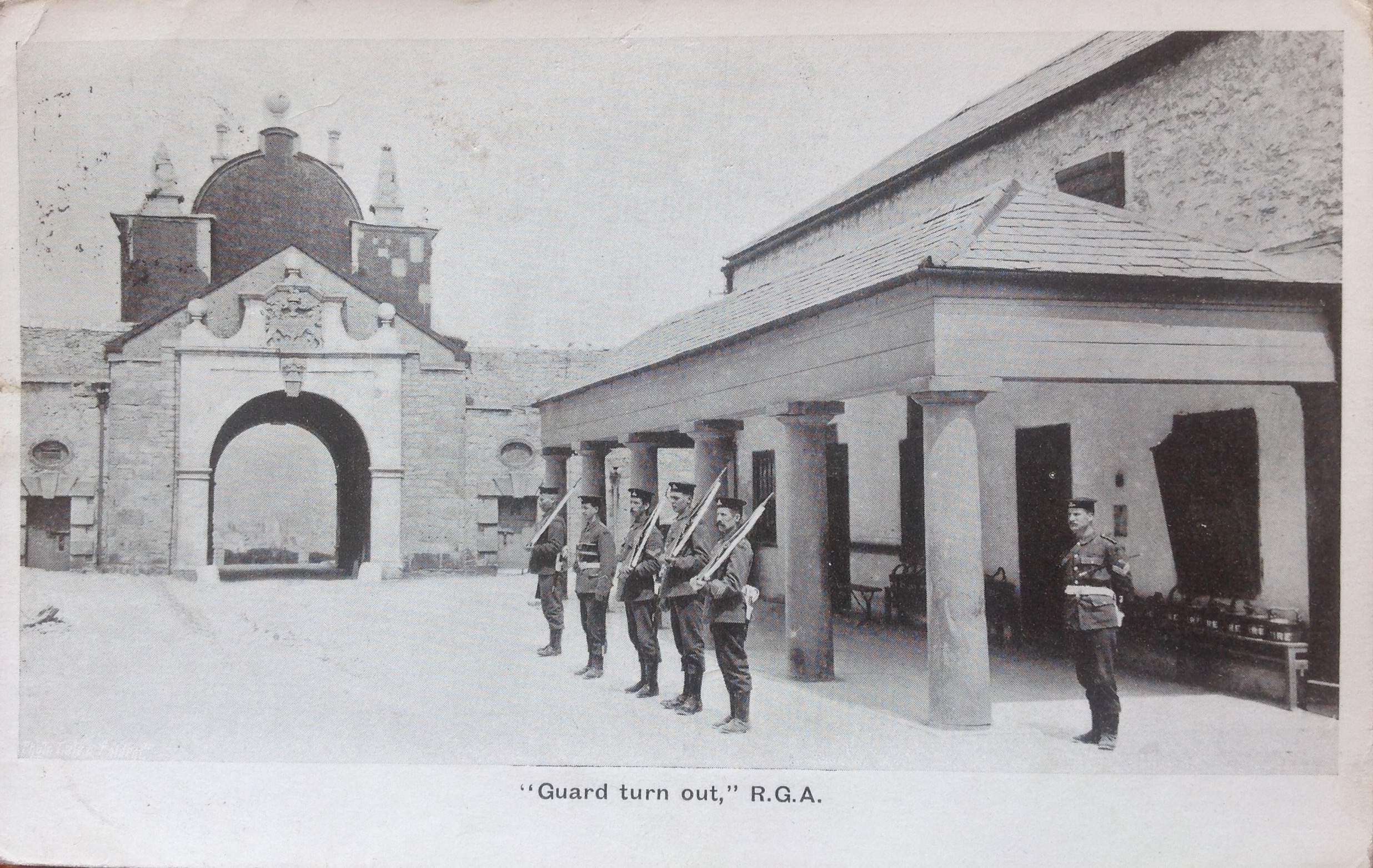
Guard mounting by the Royal Garrison Artillery (RGA), Royal Citadel, c.1905

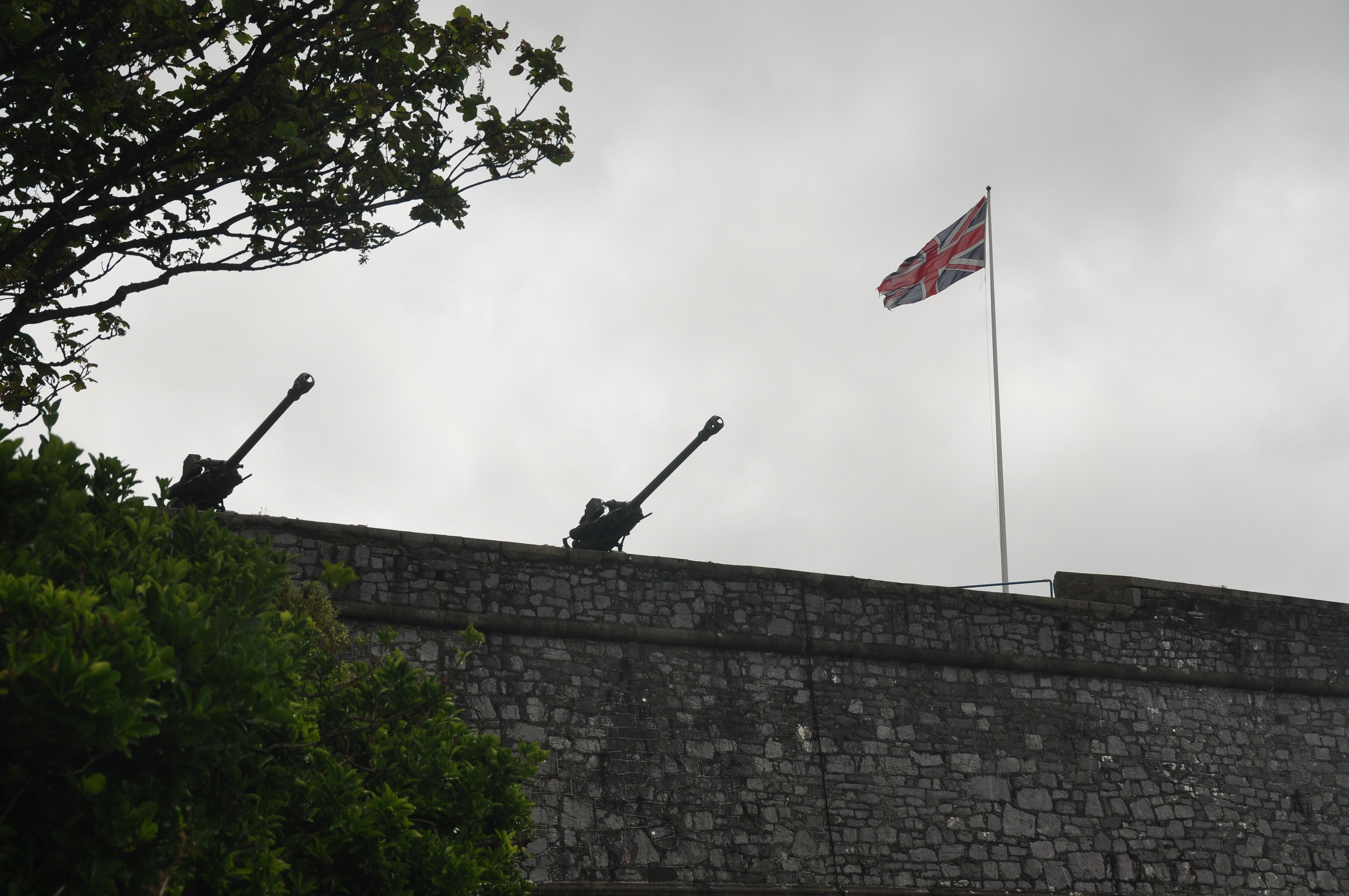
105 mm Light Guns of 29th Commando Regiment Royal Artillery on the rampart at the Citadel.

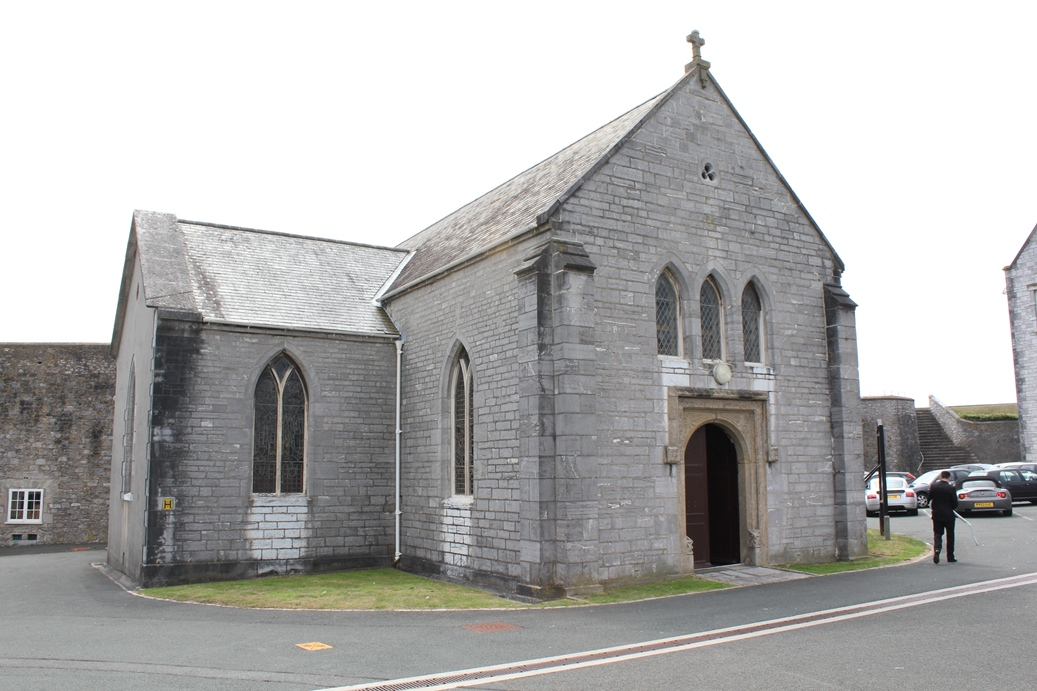
The Royal Chapel of St Katherine-upon-the-Hoe within the precincts of the Citadel.

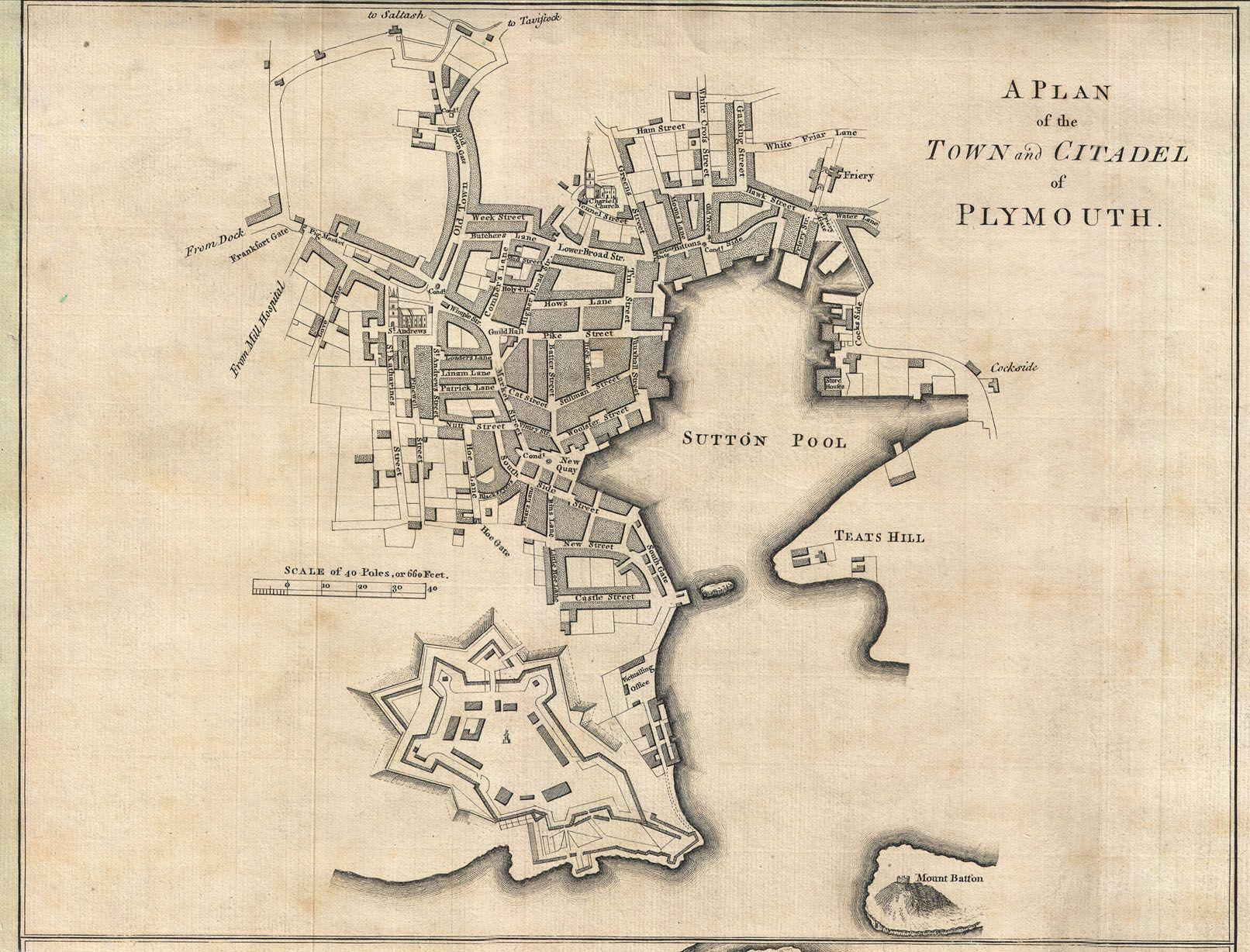
"A Plan of the Town and Citadel of Plymouth" by Benjamin Donn in 1765. It shows the design of the Royal Citadel as completed, including the outworks which are now lost.

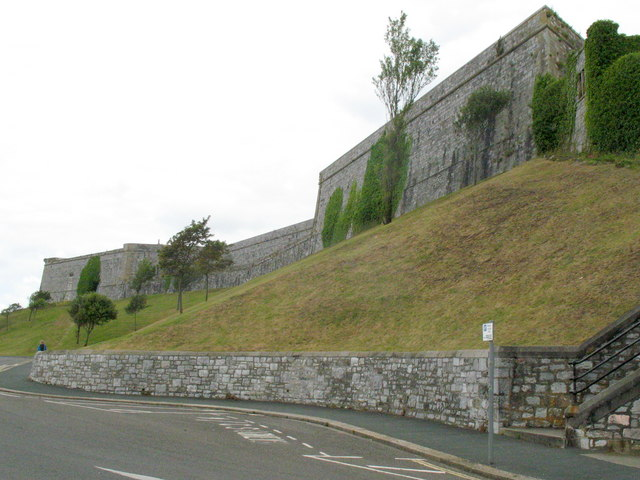
The southern bastions of the Citadel.

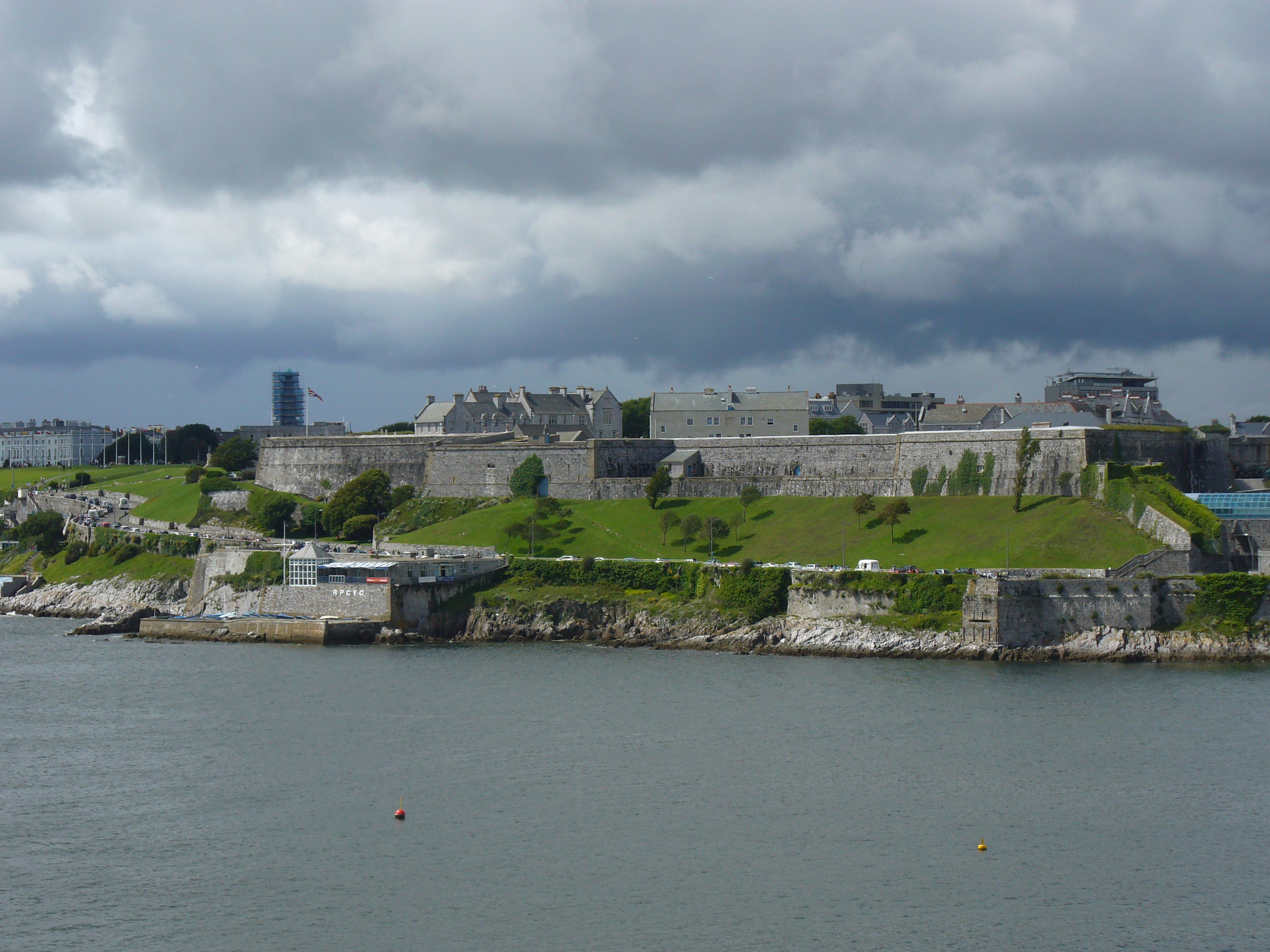
The Royal Citadel as seen from Mount Batten.

== Sources ==
- Gill, Crispin (1993). Plymouth. A New History. Devon Books. pp. 165–166. ISBN 0-86114-882-7.
- Cherry, Bridget & Pevsner, Nikolaus (1989). The Buildings of England — Devon. Harmondsworth: Penguin. pp. 648–649. ISBN 0-14-071050-7.
- Sellman, R. R. (1985). Aspects of Devon History (New ed.). Exeter: Devon Books. p. 40. ISBN 0-86114-756-1.
- Moseley, Brian (25 January 2011). "Plymouth, Royal Citadel". The Encyclopaedia of Plymouth History. Archived from the original on 28 September 2013.
