= Music Rox! =

2012 album by Moshi Monsters

Studio album by Moshi Monsters
- Released: 30 March 2012
- Length: 38:39
- Labels: Moshi Monsters; Sony

Singles from Music Rox!
- 1. "Moshi Twistmas"; 2. "Moptop TweenyBop (My Hair's Too Long)"; 3. "The Doctor Will See You Now"; 4. "Go Do The Hoodoo"; 5. "Super Moshi March"; 6. "The Missy Kix Dance"; 7. "Welcome To Jollywood"; 8. "I Heart Moshlings"

Professional ratings
Review scores
Source	Rating
Allmusic	2.5/5 stars

Music Rox! is the only album of Moshi Monsters, the online world of adoptable pet monsters for boys and girls aged 6–12 with 65 million registered users in 150 territories worldwide. The album was released on 30 March 2012.

The re-release was called Music Rox! The Original LP, which was created by Related Money.

== Track listing ==
No.	Title	Fictional Artist	Length
1.	"Opening Night (monologue)"	N/A	0:59
2.	"Moshi Monsters Theme"	The Moshi MonStars	2:54
3.	"Go Do the Hoodoo"	Big Bad Bill and the Woolly Blue Hoodoos	3:48
4.	"Trouble with the Tweenybops (monologue)"	N/A	0:48
5.	"Moptop Tweenybop (My Hair's Too Long)"	Alex Hay as Zack Binspin (featuring Blingo)	3:24
6.	"For Those About to Rox! (monologue)"	N/A	0:16
7.	"Rock Like a Zommer"	Ashley Slater as Zommer	4:03
8.	"Welcome to Jollywood"	Rajesh David as Bobbi SingSong	4:14
9.	"Moshi Radio Meets Missy Kix (monologue)"	N/A	0:29
10.	"The Missy Kix Dance"	Phillipa Alexander as Missy Kix	2:31
11.	"Behold, the Glumpatron 3000! (monologue)"	N/A	0:22
12.	"The Doctor Will See You Now"	Ashley Slater as Dr. Strangeglove and the Glump Generation	2:04
13.	"Mad, Bad and Dangerous to Slurp! (monologue)"	N/A	0:39
14.	"Sweet Tooth Stomp"	Steve Cleverley as Sweet Tooth	3:43
15.	"I Heart Moshlings"	Phillipa Alexander as Poppet	3:04
16.	"There's Only One Hope (monologue)"	N/A	0:40
17.	"Super Moshi March"	Super Moshis	2:57
18.	"The Sha La La Goodbye Song"	Every Moshi	2:38
19.	"Moshi Twistmas"	The Moshi Monsters Jingle Crew	3:19
Total length:			43:14

== Charts ==
=== Weekly charts ===
Chart (2012)	Peak position
Australian Albums (ARIA)	31
Irish Albums (IRMA)	4
Scottish Albums (Official Charts)	2
UK Albums (Official Charts)	4

=== Year-end charts ===
Chart (2012)	Position
UK Albums (OCC)	121

== Release history ==
Country	Release date	Format	Label	Ref.
United Kingdom	30 March 2012	CD; digital download	Moshi Monsters Music; Sony Music Entertainment	
