= Now That's What I Call a No.1 =

Compilation album by Various Artists
- Released: 7 July 2012
- Recorded: 1966, 1967, 1968, 1971, 1972, 1975, 1976, 1978, 1979, 1980, 1981, 1982, 1983, 1989, 1990, 1994, 1995, 1996, 1997, 1998, 2000, 2001, 2002, 2006, 2007, 2008, 2009, 2010, 2011, 2012
- Genre: Pop
- Labels: Sony Music Entertainment, EMI, Virgin Music Group, UMG, Warner Music Group

Various Artists chronology
Now That's What I Call Reggae (2012)	Now That's What I Call a No.1 (2012)	Now That's What I Call Chill (2012)

Now That's What I Call a No.1 is a triple-disc compilation album that was released in the United Kingdom on 9 July 2012. It includes 60 number ones from the past 60 years and was released in celebration of the 60th anniversary of the Official Charts.

== Track listing ==
=== CD 1 ===
1. Adele, "Someone Like You"
2. George Michael, "Careless Whisper"
3. Robbie Williams, "She's the One"
4. Take That, "Patience"
5. Wet Wet Wet, "Love Is All Around"
6. Celine Dion, "My Heart Will Go On"
7. Boyzone, "No Matter What"
8. Gnarls Barkley, "Crazy"
9. All Saints, "Never Ever"
10. Hear'Say, "Pure and Simple"
11. Britney Spears, "...Baby One More Time"
12. Spice Girls, "Wannabe"
13. Steps, "Tragedy"
14. Blondie, "Heart of Glass"
15. ABBA, "Dancing Queen"
16. Gloria Gaynor, "I Will Survive"
17. Black Box, "Ride on Time"
18. Pet Shop Boys, "West End Girls"
19. The Human League, "Don't You Want Me"
20. Tony Christie, "(Is This the Way to) Amarillo"

=== CD 2 ===
1. Rihanna feat. Jay-Z, "Umbrella"
2. Gotye feat. Kimbra, "Somebody That I Used to Know"
3. Bruno Mars, "Just the Way You Are"
4. Katy Perry feat. Snoop Dogg, "California Gurls"
5. Olly Murs, "Dance with Me Tonight"
6. David Guetta feat.Sia, "Titanium"
7. DJ Fresh feat. Rita Ora, "Hot Right Now"
8. Cheryl Cole, "Fight for This Love"
9. Jessie J, "Domino"
10. Lady Gaga, "Poker Face"
11. Tinie Tempah feat. Labrinth, "Pass Out"
12. Shaggy feat. Ricardo "RikRok" Ducent, "It Wasn't Me"
13. Coolio feat. L.V., "Gangsta's Paradise"
14. The Fugees, "Killing Me Softly"
15. The Black Eyed Peas, "I Gotta Feeling"
16. Kylie Minogue, "Can't Get You Out of My Head"
17. R. Kelly, "I Believe I Can Fly"
18. Oasis, "Don't Look Back in Anger"
19. The Verve, "The Drugs Don't Work"
20. Coldplay, "Paradise"

=== CD 3 ===
1. Billy Joel, "Uptown Girl"
2. The Beach Boys, "Good Vibrations"
3. Elvis Presley, "Jailhouse Rock"
4. David Bowie, "Let's Dance"
5. Marvin Gaye, "I Heard It Through the Grapevine"
6. Rod Stewart, "Maggie May"
7. 10cc, "I'm Not in Love"
8. The Righteous Brothers, "Unchained Melody"
9. Culture Club, "Do You Really Want to Hurt Me"
10. Soft Cell, "Tainted Love"
11. Dexys Midnight Runners, "Come On Eileen"
12. The Jam, "Going Underground"
13. Ian Dury and the Blockheads, "Hit Me with Your Rhythm Stick"
14. Adam & the Ants, "Stand and Deliver"
15. Sinéad O'Connor, "Nothing Compares 2 U"
16. Kate Bush, "Wuthering Heights"
17. The Animals, "The House of the Rising Sun"
18. Procol Harum, "A Whiter Shade of Pale"
19. Simon & Garfunkel, "Bridge Over Troubled Water"
20. Louis Armstrong, "What a Wonderful World"

== Charts ==
Chart (2012)	Peak Position
UK Compilations Chart	1
UK Download Albums Chart	1

== Release history ==
Country	Release date
Ireland	6 July 2012
United Kingdom	9 July 2012
