= Now That's What I Call Reggae =

Compilation album by Various Artists
- Released: 22 June 2012
- Recorded: 1968, 1969, 1970, 1971, 1972, 1973, 1974, 1975, 1976, 1977, 1978, 1979, 1980, 1981, 1982, 1983, 1985, 1986, 1987, 1988, 1990, 1992, 1993, 1994, 1995, 1997, 2000, 2003, 2004, 2007, 2010, 2011
- Genre: Pop, Reggae
- Label: Sony Music Entertainment, EMI, Virgin Music Group, UMG, Warner Music Group

Various Artists chronology
Now That's What I Call Britain (2012)	Now That's What I Call Reggae (2012)	Now That's What I Call a No.1 (2012)

Now That's What I Call Reggae or Now Reggae is a triple-disc compilation album released in the United Kingdom on 25 June 2012.

== Track listing ==
=== CD 1 ===
1. Shaggy feat. Ricardo "RikRok" Ducent – "It Wasn't Me"
2. UB40 – "Red Red Wine"
3. Aswad – "Don't Turn Around"
4. Chaka Demus & Pliers feat. Jack Radics & Taxi Gang – "Twist and Shout"
5. Kevin Lyttle – "Turn Me On"
6. Althea & Donna – "Uptown Top Ranking"
7. Bob Marley & the Wailers – "Sun is Shining"
8. Pato Banton feat. Ali & Robin Campbell – "Baby Come Back"
9. Inner Circle – "Sweat (A La La La La Long)"
10. Eddy Grant – "Gimme Hope Jo'anna"
11. Peter Andre feat. Bubbler Ranx – "Mysterious Girl"
12. Ken Boothe – "Everything I Own"
13. Maxi Priest – "Wild World"
14. Gyptian – "Hold You"
15. Black Slate – "Amigo"
16. The Police – "Walking on the Moon"
17. Dave & Ansell Collins – "Double Barrel"
18. Musical Youth – "Pass the Dutchie"
19. Desmond Dekker – "You Can Get It If You Really Want"
20. Steel Pulse – "Ku Klux Klan"

=== CD 2 ===
1. C.J. Lewis – "Sweets for My Sweet"
2. Big Mountain – "Baby, I Love Your Way"
3. Shabba Ranks & Chevelle Franklin – "Mr. Loverman"
4. Bobby McFerrin – "Don't Worry, Be Happy"
5. Maxi Priest – "Close to You"
6. Desmond Dekker – "Israelites"
7. UB40 – "(I Can't Help) Falling in Love with You"
8. Shinehead – "Jamaican in New York"
9. Dawn Penn – "You Don't Love Me (No, No, No)"
10. Janet Kay – "Silly Games"
11. Junior Murvin – "Police & Thieves"
12. Red Dragon feat. Brian & Tony Gold – "Compliments on Your Kiss"
13. Barry Biggs – "Sideshow"
14. Harry J Allstars – "The Liquidator"
15. John Holt – "Help Me Make It Through the Night"
16. Sugar Minott – "Good Thing Going (We've Got a Good Thing Going)"
17. Ini Kamoze – "Here Comes the Hotstepper"
18. Diana King – "Shy Guy"
19. Susan Cadogan – "Hurt So Good"
20. Wayne Wade – "Lady"

=== CD 3 ===
1. Sean Kingston – "Beautiful Girls"
2. Shaggy – "Boombastic"
3. Apache Indian – "Boom Shack-A-Lak"
4. Grace Jones feat. Bounty Killer – "My Jamaican Guy"
5. Aswad – "Shine"
6. Johnny Nash – "I Can See Clearly Now"
7. Gregory Isaacs – "Night Nurse"
8. Sophia George – "Girlie Girlie"
9. Chaka Demus & Pliers – "Tease Me"
10. Blue Lagoon – "Break My Stride"
11. Eddy Grant – "I Don't Wanna Dance"
12. Bob & Marcia – "Young, Gifted and Black"
13. The Pioneers – "Let Your Yeah Be Yeah"
14. Dandy Livingstone – "Suzanne, Beware of the Devil"
15. Boris Gardiner – "I Wanna Wake Up with You"
16. Johnny Nash – "Stir It Up"
17. Jimmy Cliff – "Wonderful World, Beautiful People"
18. Chaka Demus & Pliers – "She Don't Let Nobody"
19. Greyhound – "Black & White"
20. Nicky Thomas – "Love of the Common People"

== Charts ==
Chart (2012)	Peak Position
UK Compilations Chart	1
UK Download Albums Chart	4

== Release history ==
Country	Release date
Ireland	22 June 2012
United Kingdom	25 June 2012
