= In My Dreams (Military Wives album) =

Studio album by Military Wives
- Released: 5 March 2012
- Recorded: 2011
- Genre: Popular choral
- Length: 39:29
- Label: Decca
- Producer: Jon Cohen

Military Wives chronology
In My Dreams (2012)	Stronger Together (2012)

In My Dreams is the debut album released by the Military Wives, originally a choir of women who rose to public prominence in 2011 when they featured in the fourth series of the BBC TV series The Choir, presented by choirmaster Gareth Malone.

The album features choral arrangements for 5 Military Wives' choirs from Plymouth, Chivenor, Portsmouth, CTCRM Lympstone and Catterick Garrison. Featuring a number of hit singles including Bob Dylan's "Make You Feel My Love", U2's "With or Without You", and Coldplay's "Fix You". It also includes the Military Wives' 2011 Christmas Number One hit, "Wherever You Are", composed by Paul Mealor. The title track, "In My Dreams", also composed by Mealor, features the voice of Jonjo Kerr, a previous contestant in the television music competition The X Factor. The success of the TV series and the creation of the new choirs that feature on the album was the beginning of the formation of the Military Wives Choirs Foundation to whom £1 from the sale of each album will go to further their aims of creating a social support network across the UK for Military Wives through the medium of song.

== Track listing ==
No.	Title	Lyrics	Music	Length
1.	"Make You Feel My Love"	Bob Dylan		3:07
2.	"In My Dreams" (featuring Jon-Joseph Kerr)	Paul Mealor		3:17
3.	"With Or Without You"	U2		3:59
4.	"Up Where We Belong (Love Lift Us Up)"	Will Jennings	Jack Nitzsche and Buffy Sainte-Marie	4:17
5.	"True Love Ways"	Buddy Holly and Norman Petty		3:12
6.	"You've Got A Friend"	Carole King		4:21
7.	"Eternal Father, Strong to Save"	William Whiting	John Bacchus Dykes	3:24
8.	"Fix You"	Coldplay (Chris Martin, Jonny Buckland, Guy Berryman, Will Champion)		4:00
9.	"Silver Tassie"			4:03
10.	"On My Own"	Herbert Kretzmer	Claude-Michel Schönberg	2:58
11.	"Wherever You Are"	Paul Mealor		2:51
Total length:				39:29

== Charts ==
=== Weekly charts ===
Chart (2012)	Peak position
Scottish Albums (Official Charts)	2
UK Albums (Official Charts)	1

=== Year-end charts ===
Chart (2012)	Position
UK Albums (OCC)	44

== Release history ==
Country	Release date	Format(s)	Label
United Kingdom	5 March 2012	CD, digital download	Decca Records
