= Military Wives =

British choir charity

Military Wives Choirs
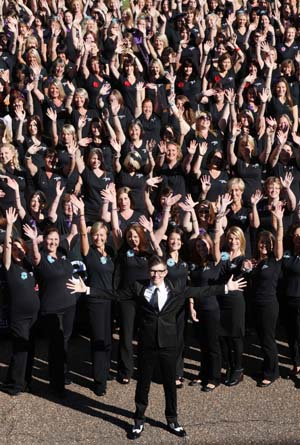
- Military Wives Choirs members and Gareth Malone launch new charity, September 2012.

Background information
- Genres: Choral
- Years active: 2011–present
- Labels: Decca, BMG
- Website: www.militarywiveschoirs.org

The Military Wives Choirs is a registered charity and network of 70 choirs in British military bases across the UK and overseas, bringing women in the military community closer together through singing. With over 2,000 members, the MWC network is tri-service (Royal Navy, Royal Marines, British Army, Royal Air Force) and any woman with a military connection can join including those currently serving, veterans, mothers, sisters, and daughters, empowering women from across the military community. The organisation was a subsidiary charity of SSAFA until the beginning of 2023 when it became an independent charity whilst still maintaining its close links with SSAFA.

== History ==
The first choir held their first rehearsal in April 2010 in Catterick Garrison. It was the idea of two Scots Guards wives (Nicky Clarke and Caroline Jopp) who decided, whilst their husbands were deployed in Afghanistan in 2009, to put up posters at the Garrison to actively encourage and look for women interested in singing together, to help support and give the wives a focus whilst their husbands were deployed. They engaged a well-known local music teacher and set about putting together a choir made up of wives, girlfriends, and servicewomen and so the first choir was formed. A letter was written to choirmaster Gareth Malone looking for help and support with the choir. At that time, he was receiving acclaim for his BBC television programme, The Choir, and felt that this was an idea that could be replicated. Malone then went to RMB Chivenor to start another choir there.

Following the success at Chivenor, Malone, as part of the series, formed another choir at the Royal Citadel, Plymouth. Following the broadcast of the series and the release of the single Wherever You Are, more choirs were added at CTCRM, Lympstone and HMNB Portsmouth. The five choirs of Catterick, Chivenor, Plymouth, Portsmouth and Lympstone were invited to contribute to the album In My Dreams under the name Military Wives.

=== The Choir: Military Wives ===
The Military Wives Choir was formed by Gareth Malone at the Royal Marines Base Chivenor, as part of the fourth series of the BBC/Twenty Twenty television series The Choir, entitled The Choir: Military Wives. The choir aimed to help the wives and girlfriends of servicemen currently deployed to Afghanistan express themselves through song.

As the series progressed, Malone led the Chivenor group to perform locally at the nearby town of Barnstaple, and then, alongside the choir formed at the Royal Citadel, Plymouth, at a Passing Out dinner at the Royal Military Academy Sandhurst and Armed Forces Day celebrations in Plymouth. The climax of the television series was their performance of Wherever You Are at The Royal British Legion's Festival of Remembrance at the Royal Albert Hall on 12 November 2011, in the presence of HM The Queen. The song was created by Paul Mealor from extracts of correspondence between the choir and their spouses in Afghanistan.

=== Subsequent activities ===
Following the series, the song Wherever You Are was released as a single on 19 December 2011, to become the 2011 UK Singles Chart Christmas number one, a feat it achieved when it sold 556,000 copies within a week of launch (more than the rest of the top 12 combined). A section of the cost of the single was donated to the Royal British Legion and the SSAFA Forces Help charities.

The success of the television series and the Christmas single led the five established choirs being approached to contribute to an album. The album, entitled In My Dreams after the lead single, was released in early March 2012, and went to top the album chart in the UK within a week, with £1 from each album sale going towards the Military Wives Choirs Foundation. The foundation has the aim to support the founding of Military Wives' choirs across the UK. Nicky Clarke, co-founder of The Military Wives Choir Foundation, whose original idea and dream to have a choir on every base was gaining momentum, wrote in her note on the album cover, "It is music which gives us strength, hope, courage, support, laughter, and friendship, often when it is most needed".

The choir performed at the opening of the Olympic Stadium in London when ten choirs contributed to the Gary Barlow and Andrew Lloyd Webber single written to mark the Diamond Jubilee of Elizabeth II. This single, entitled Sing features voices and instruments from across the Commonwealth and features the Military Wives as the backing track and representing the UK.

The second album Stronger Together, produced by Jon Cohen in July 2012, was recorded by over 700 women from 24 Military Wives Choirs. The original five of Catterick, Chivenor, Plymouth, Portsmouth, Lympstone, were joined by another nineteen; Abingdon, Ayios Nikolaos (Cyprus), Chicksands, Condor, Culdrose, Defence Academy, Dishforth, Herford (Germany), JHQ, Marchwood, Marham, Middle Wallop, Salisbury Plain, Shawbury, Shorncliffe, Warminster, Wattisham, West of Scotland and Wimbish. On 13 September over 650 ladies from the 24 choirs recorded the Stronger Together video in London for release on 5 November 2012. Nicky Clarke wrote on the album cover... "Stronger Together really does sum up this year (2012) we've brought together women from all over the Military Community, in their own choirs, on-line, at the Jubilee and now on this album and still the choirs continue to grow. This is a testament to every woman in the military community – they are strong, resourceful women who support their loved ones when they're away".

October 2012 saw more success for The Military Wives Choir winning Classical Brits single of the year, they performed Sing live at the Royal Albert Hall with Gareth Malone, Gary Barlow and Sir Andrew Lloyd Webber. Then in November Jonjo Kerr returned from his tour of duty in Afghanistan to sing with representatives from the four choirs of Catterick, Chivenor, Lympstone, Portsmouth and Plymouth who originally recorded In My Dreams and performed at the Festival of Remembrance altogether, live for the first time.

December 2012 saw the Military Wives Choirs round off a whirlwind year with representatives of the choirs singing as part of the Queen's Speech on Christmas Day.

In December 2015, the Military Wives Choirs came together with Walking With The Wounded to produce the single I’m Gonna Be (500 Miles) for the ‘Walking Home for Christmas’ campaign. The track is a festive recording of The Proclaimers’ hit song I’m Gonna Be (500 miles) and all proceeds from the single were donated to Walking With The Wounded and The Military Wives Choirs Foundation.

February 2016 saw legendary singer Lulu team up with the Military Wives Choirs for the single ‘Cry’. The song was inspired by Lulu's diagnosis of PTSD from the violence she experienced throughout her childhood and the affinity it helped her to feel with soldiers suffering from the same issue, albeit from different circumstances. Lulu generously donated all of the proceeds to the Military Wives Choir Foundation charity. The Military Wives Choirs also joined Lulu on her thirty five date UK tour throughout March and April to perform the single. This is something which had never been done before by a mainstream artist and the Choirs were thrilled to be involved in.

In November 2016, the Military Wives Choirs came together to record album, ‘Home for Christmas’. Recorded in ten different locations, the album includes over 1,000 ladies from 63 choirs across the UK and overseas and can all be heard on the title track Home for Christmas. The album also features six classic carols which have been updated with lyrics reflecting what Christmas means to women in the military community. Produced by BMG and steered by three accomplished choral conductors - Hilary Davan Wetton, Will Dawes and Mark De-Lisser, the Military Wives Choirs’ beautiful collection of songs embodies the true spirit of Christmas – its religious significance, love, family and harmony. The album was accompanied by a Cathedral tour through the UK, which involved 17 different choirs.

In June 2018, to tie in with Armed Forces Day, the Military Wives Choirs marked the World War I centenary with a commemorative project, coming together with military bands across all three services to create ‘Remember', their newest album. The 1105 voices which appear on it represent the families at home and those who served, both then and now. Choir members from 69 choirs in the network were involved in making the album, a total of 1105 singers including 93 from overseas choirs, recording in seven venues across the UK and conducted by Hilary Davan Wetton. Music for the album centres on five exciting commissions, written by prestigious composers from the classical, pop and film worlds - Owain Park, Joanna Forbes L'Estrange and Alexander L’Estrange, Adam Langston, and James Kennedy and Catrin Southall. Laura Wright (singer) co-wrote the single, 'Brave', with John Haywood and Sean Hargreaves, the album's producers, and features as a solo artist on the track. Sean Hargreaves co-wrote the 2018 UK Eurovision entry, Storm (SuRie song). The rest of the album is composed of fresh arrangements of World War I marching songs, a choral medley of regimental marches from the three services, some reflective, traditional pieces and some contemporary songs. The album reached #4 in the Independent Albums Chart and #40 in the UK Albums Chart.

=== The Military Wives Choirs charity (Foundation) ===
In January 2012, choir members from Chivenor, Plymouth and Catterick came together to discuss how best to create a sustainable organization to benefit all military wives, building on the legacy from the success of the song ‘Wherever You Are’. Encouraged by Gareth and actively assisted by other supporters, including SSAFA, the Royal British Legion, Decca and 20:20 Television, the concept of a Foundation, to act as an umbrella organisation for all military wives choirs, was born.

Needing a team to breathe life into the vision, a call was put out to all choirs in February 2012 and in March 2012 a group of women stepped forward to volunteer their time to found the charity we now know as the Military Wives Choirs Foundation (MWCF). That group of women was Caroline Jopp, Nicky Clarke, Sharon Bristow, Kelly Leonard, Emma Hanlon-Perry, Vanessa Murtagh, Emma Dineen, Claire Balneaves, Sarah McCallister and Carol Gedye, supported by SSAFA's Communications Director at the time, Athol Hendry.

Running alongside the business of setting up choirs the team were managing numerous high-profile projects including recording three albums; ‘In My Dreams’, ‘Stronger Together’ and ‘Sing’ — releasing a book The Military Wives; performing at the Queen's Diamond Jubilee, the Classical Brit Awards, the Festival of Remembrance, and countless television appearances and local performances. The charity was officially incorporated on 25 July 2012 with four founding trustees, Nicky Clarke, Athol Hendry, David Ashman and Kirsty Bushell. The dedication and commitment of the co-founders and trustees was realised on 13 September 2012 when 647 women from 24 choirs came together at Wellington Barracks in London to officially launch the charity. On this same day, Gareth Malone was welcomed as the charity's first patron.

The organisation continues to operate as a registered charity and network of 75 choirs in British military bases across the UK and overseas, bringing women in the military community closer together through singing. With over 2,200 members, the MWC network is tri-service (British Army, Royal Air Force, Royal Navy, Royal Marines) and any woman with a military connection can join including those currently serving, veterans, mothers, sisters and daughters, empowering women from across the military community. The organisation is also a subsidiary charity of SSAFA. As part of the SSAFA family, the Military Wives Choirs worked side by side SSAFA's mission to relieve need, suffering and distress amongst the Armed Forces, veterans and their families in order to support their independence and dignity as a charity run by, for and with women in the military community.

On 17 October 2020, the choir received a grant of £92,057 from the Culture Recovery Fund to help find and fund rehearsal venues, pay musical directors, and to deliver weekly rehearsals and offer safe spaces for the women in the group.

== Discography ==
=== Albums ===
Title	Year	Peak chart positions	
Title	Year	UK	UK Classical
In My Dreams	Released: 5 March 2012; Label: Decca; Formats: CD, digital download	1	
Stronger Together	Released: 5 November 2012; Label: Decca; Formats: CD, digital download	5	
Home for Christmas	Released: 25 November 2016; Label: BMG; Formats: CD, digital download	42	2
'Remember'	Released: 29 June 2018; Label: Absolute Label Services; Formats: CD, digital download	—	

=== Singles ===
Title	Year	Peak chart positions	Sales	Album
Title	Year	UK	Sales	Album
"Wherever You Are" (with Gareth Malone)	2011	1	UK: 631,000	In My Dreams
"In My Dreams" (featuring Jon-Joseph Kerr)	2012	—		In My Dreams
"Sing" (with Gary Barlow and the Commonwealth band)	2012	1		Sing
"Cry" (Lulu with the Military Wives Choirs)	2016	—		Making Life Rhyme
"Home for Christmas"	2016	—		Home For Christmas
"The Poppy Red" (with The Band of the Household Cavalry) Owain Park	2018	—		'Remember'
"Brave" (with Laura Wright (singer) and The Royal Marines Corps of Drums) Sean Hargreaves, John Haywood, Laura Wright	2018	—		'Remember'

== See also ==
- Gareth Malone
- Paul Mealor
- The Choir: Military Wives
- Military Wives the Musical
