= Wherever You Are (Military Wives song) =

Single by Military Wives featuring Gareth Malone

from the album In My Dreams
- B-side: "Now Sleeps The Crimson Petal (Four Madrigals On Rose Texts): A Spotless Rose"
- Released: 15 December 2011
- Recorded: 2011
- Genre: Choral
- Length: 2:51
- Label: Decca
- Songwriter: Text of assorted letters set to music by Paul Mealor
- Producers: Jon Cohen. Mixed by Phil Da Costa and Jon Cohen

Military Wives singles chronology
"Wherever You Are" (2011)	"In My Dreams" (2012)
- Spin-off product of the 2011 BBC TV series The Choir: Military Wives

"Wherever You Are" is a song written by Paul Mealor and performed by the Military Wives Choir, sung by ladies from Chivenor and Plymouth under the direction of Gareth Malone. It is a spin-off of the BBC Two television series The Choir: Military Wives. It was released on 19 December 2011 following a campaign to make it the 2011 UK Christmas number one. The song entered the UK Singles Chart at number 1, claiming the Christmas number 1 – selling more than 556,000 copies in the week, more than the rest of the Top 12 combined. The song also claimed the status of the biggest first week sales since "A Moment Like This" by Leona Lewis sold over 571,000 copies in its first week in 2006. The song was included on their debut studio album In My Dreams.

"Wherever You Are" was nominated for Best British Single in the 2012 BRIT Awards, but the award was won by One Direction for their single "What Makes You Beautiful".

== Background ==
The Military Wives was formed in 2011 by Gareth Malone for the BBC Two television series The Choir: Military Wives. The programme documented Malone's visits to Chivenor Barracks first and then a few months later to Royal Citadel, Plymouth – both in Devon, in which he formed two choirs of wives and partners of British military personnel deployed on active service in the Afghanistan War. In forming the choirs, Malone aimed to raise the women's morale and raise their profile in the public perception.

The cover art features the emblem of a Remembrance poppy on a green background and the logos of the charities benefiting from the sales. It was released in the UK as a single by Decca Records on 19 December 2011, with proceeds going to the Royal British Legion and SSAFA Forces Help

=== 2011 UK Christmas number one campaign ===
The song competed against rival Christmas campaigns to re-release Nirvana's "Smells Like Teen Spirit", unsigned YouTube blogger Alex Day, who released multiple remixes of a song called "Forever Yours" and The X Factor winners Little Mix, who released a cover version of Damien Rice's "Cannonball". There was also a campaign supported by Chris Moyles of BBC Radio 1 to get Lou Monte's 1960 recording of "Dominick the Donkey" to Christmas number 1 and this song was number 2 in the iTunes and Amazon charts throughout the majority of the Christmas week behind the Military Wives. Chris Moyles' support of this rival song for Christmas number 1 was controversial because the BBC appeared to be supporting "Wherever You Are" to be Christmas number 1 as BBC Radio 2 added the song to their A-list and Chris Evans was a major supporter of the record and the choir.

=== Campaign for US number one ===
On 29 December 2011 Piers Morgan campaigned on Twitter for the Military Wives Choir to reach number one in the US. He urged his 1.6 million followers to invest in the collective's charity track 'Wherever You Are' following its stateside release on Boxing Day. He tweeted "Just heard the Military Wives single gets released in the US today", posting a link to the official video. "Watch this my American friends, then go buy it...Good luck ladies, hope you get a No1 in America." The Sun reported that the former Britain's Got Talent judge invited the choir to perform on his US show Piers Morgan Tonight.

== Writing and recording ==
The text of "Wherever You Are" is a love poem compiled from letters written between the women and their absent husbands and partners. It was set to music by composer Paul Mealor, who is noted for his composition of a choral work sung at the Royal Wedding in 2011.

== Live performances ==
The first public performance of the piece was at The Royal British Legion's Festival of Remembrance held at the Royal Albert Hall on 12 November 2011 attended by The Queen. The event was broadcast in the final episode of The Choir television programme to an estimated television audience of 2.65 million viewers.

The Military Wives made a guest appearance on the BBC's Strictly Come Dancing on 10 December 2011, when Vincent Simone and Flavia Cacace danced to their performance of "Wherever You Are".

== Commercial performance ==
A campaign was launched to promote sales of the CD single, with the aim of it becoming the 2011 Christmas number one in the UK Singles Chart. Support for this campaign was received from BBC Radio 2 DJ Chris Evans. In the traditional, competitive speculation in the run-up to Christmas, the Military Wives single was said to be in competition for the title with the X Factor winners Little Mix, who released a cover version of Damien Rice's "Cannonball", a campaign to promote the 2011 re-release of Nirvana's "Smells Like Teen Spirit" to number one, a campaign to highjack the Christmas Number 1 spot by British YouTube vlogger Alex Day named Forever Yours and a campaign fronted by Chris Moyles from BBC Radio 1 to hijack the Christmas #1 with Dominick the Donkey. The race was further heated by the introduction of a trophy for the number one record by the Official Charts Company to celebrate sixty years of the UK Charts. It is to be awarded to every artist who makes it to number one in the UK Charts, with the first trophy being given out to the 2011 Christmas number one single.

In mid-December 2011 it was reported that "Wherever You Are" had broken sales records in becoming the most pre-ordered music item ever on the UK Amazon website. According to Amazon, the pre-order sales were three times as many as those of Take That’s 2010 album Progress.

Following the second day of release, some 242,000 copies of the single had been sold, making it the fastest selling single since X Factor winner Shayne Ward's 2005 single That's My Goal. At that point it was leading the race for Christmas number one, having sold six times the number of singles as second place Little Mix.

On the chart dated 24 December 2011, the song debuted at number 144 on the UK Singles Chart. The following week the song climbed to the number-one spot, becoming the Christmas number one of 2011. It sold 555,622 copies, more than the rest of the top 12 combined. It is also the biggest first-week sales since "A Moment Like This" by Leona Lewis sold over 571,000 copies in its first week in 2006. Despite impressive first week sales, "Wherever You Are" only spent one week atop the chart, with Coldplay's "Paradise" replacing it at the summit on January 1; causing it to fall three places to number four.

== B side ==
The B side of the single is a choral setting by Paul Mealor of the Christmas song "A Spotless Rose". The song is part of Mealor's "Rose Cycle " of songs entitled "Now Sleeps the Crimson Petal".

== Charts ==
=== Weekly charts ===
Chart (2011)	Peak position
Scottish Singles Sales (Official Charts)	1
UK Singles (Official Charts)	1

=== Year-end charts ===
Chart (2011)	Position
UK Singles (Official Charts)	13

== Certifications ==
Certifications for "Wherever You Are"
Region	Certification	Certified units/sales
United Kingdom (BPI)	Platinum	600,000^{*}
^{*} Sales figures based on certification alone.

== Release history ==
Region	Date	Label	Format
Ireland	15 December 2011	Decca Records	Digital download
United Kingdom	18 December 2011	Decca Records	Digital download
United Kingdom	19 December 2011	Decca Records	CD single
