= Sox Fest '09 =

Sox Fest
- The South Oxhey Festival
- Genre: Popular choral music
- Dates: 2009
- Locations: South Oxhey, Hertfordshire, UK
- Years active: 2009
- Founders: Gareth Malone
- Website: www.southoxheyfestival.co.uk

The Sox Fest was a community festival which took place in 2009 in South Oxhey, in the borough of Watford, United Kingdom. It was created by choirmaster Gareth Malone for the BBC television series The Choir:Unsung Town and featured a live performance by the South Oxhey choir.
