= Flesh and Blood =

Flesh and Blood (alternately Flesh & Blood) may refer to:

- Flesh and Blood (card game), a collectible card game released in 2019

== Religion ==
- the Christian sacrament of the Eucharist
- flesh and blood, an expression of the church father Justin Martyr

== Books ==
- Flesh and Blood, a 1920 work by François Mauriac
- Flesh and Blood (Kellerman novel), a 2001 novel by American author Jonathan Kellerman
- Flesh and Blood, a 2004 novel by Australian author Jackie French. It is also known as Blood Will Tell.
- Flesh & Blood, a 1994 novel by Graham Masterton
- Flesh and Blood, a novel by American author Pete Hamill
- Flesh and Blood, a novel by British author John Harvey
- Flesh and Blood, a historical survey by Scottish author Reay Tannahill
- Flesh and Blood, a novel by Michael Cunningham

== Film and television ==
=== Film ===
- Flesh and Blood (1922 film), a film starring Lon Chaney, Sr.
- Flesh and Blood (1951 film), a British film with George Cole
- Flesh and Blood (1968 film), a television film directed by Arthur Penn
- Flesh and Blood (1985 film), an action/adventure film directed by Paul Verhoeven
- Flesh & Blood, a 1996 gay pornographic film directed by Jerry Douglas
- Flesh and Blood (2017 film), an American drama film directed by Mark Webber

=== TV ===
- Flesh and Blood (TV series), a 2020 British drama
- Flesh 'n' Blood (TV series), a 1991 American sitcom
- "Flesh and Blood" (Doctors), a 2005 episode
- "Flesh and Blood" (Juliet Bravo), a 1985 episode
- "Flesh and Blood" (Person of Interest), a 2012 episode
- "Flesh and Blood" (Star Trek: Voyager), a 2000 episode
- "Flesh and Blood" (Stargate SG-1), a 2006 episode
- "Flesh & Blood" (Into the Dark), a 2018 episode
- "Flesh & Blood" (The Unit), a 2009 episode
- Flesh and Blood, a 2020 episode of Masterpiece Mystery!
- My Flesh and Blood, a 2003 documentary about the Tom Family, directed by Jonathan Karsh

== Music ==
- Flesh and Blood, a Portland, Oregon based band fronted by Billy Rancher

=== Albums ===
- Flesh and Blood (Jimmy Barnes album), or the title track, 2021
- Flesh and Blood (Mike Peters album)
- Flesh and Blood (No Innocent Victim album), 1999
- Flesh and Blood (Roxy Music album)
- Flesh & Blood (John Butler Trio album)
- Flesh & Blood (Poison album), 1990
- Flesh & Blood (Whitesnake album), 2019
- Flesh + Blood (Judiciary album), 2023

=== Songs ===
- "Flesh and Blood" (song), by Johnny Cash, 1970
- "Flesh & Blood" (song), by the Invictus Games Choir and Gareth Malone
- "Flesh and Blood", by Wilson Phillips from Shadows and Light
- "Flesh and Blood", by Solomon Burke from Don't Give Up on Me
- "Flesh and Blood", by Imelda May from Life Love Flesh Blood
- "Flesh and Blood", by Reveille from Laced
- "Flesh 'n Blood", by Oingo Boingo written for the film Ghostbusters II
- "Flesh and Blood", by Ted Nugent from Scream Dream
