= The Big Performance =

- Also known as: The Big Performance 2 "The Big Performance 3
- Genre: Music, Reality
- Presented by: Gareth Malone
- Narrated by: Melanie C (series 1); Sara Cox (series 2-3)
- Country of origin: United Kingdom
- Original language: English
- No. of seasons: 3
- No. of episodes: 30

Production
- Running time: 30 minutes

Original release
- Network: CBBC
- Release: 28 September 2010 – 8 August 2014

Related
- The Big Reunion, Coronation Street, BBC news, Trainspotting

The Big Performance is a CBBC reality series which sees 10 shy children, who are terrified of performing in front of the public, sing at a huge event. The first series, which started in September 2010, saw the contestants perform at Proms in the Park, while the second series which started in September 2011 is seeing the children perform at Children in Need live on 18 November 2011.

== Format ==
The series recruits ten shy children aged 11–13 to take part in the show and improve their confidence, as well as their singing skills. These children have usually been bullied in the past. The group would take a musical tour of the country, compete for the coveted solo spot, and face increasingly difficult performance challenges until they are ready for their final big performance. In the first series, it featured the 10 kids performing in front of 40,000 at BBC's Proms in the Park, while the second series featured the kids performing at Children in Need 2011 as part of a nationwide choir. A third series had been confirmed for October 2014, however the air date was later changed to July 2014. Filming started in April and finished in early August. There are often messages from celebrities to help the children boost their confidence and put their all in the performance, along with some advice. The series started with arguably the most famous cast, including James who really got the crowd going with his solo, a classic tune from the one and only Simon and Garfunkel. Romance, blood and tears is what prevails the series. It all kicked off in Series 2 when a love triangle was formed between three budding adolescents which later came to a terrifying end as Gareth shut down all romantic involvement before watershed on CBBC.

== Episodes ==
=== Series 1: 2010 ===
Episode	Original air date	Details
1	28 September 2010	The children meet each other and have to sing a solo in front of one another, much to James' dismay
2	5 October 2010	Katie's and Annabel's solo
3	12 October 2010	Chloe's solo
4	19 October 2010	Chris' and Oli's solo
5	26 October 2010	Emily's solo
6	2 November 2010	Howard's solo
7	9 November 2010	Miriyah's solo
8	16 November 2010	Isthaque's solo
9	23 November 2010	Jordan's solo
10	30 November 2010	Getting ready for the performance
11	7 December 2010	The Big Performance
12	14 December 2010	Looking back at the series

=== Series 2: 2011 ===
Episode	Original air date	Details
1	13 September 2011	The series kicks off real good in London, at BBC Television Centre where the children will return to for their final performance, and Malone introduces the all-important song – Avril Lavigne's hit "Keep Holding On". Their first challenge is to find the courage to sing in front of each other, so to ease them in gently Malone chose duets for the group to perform in pairs. To get them ready for this, Blue Peter star Barney Harwood gave the children a presenting masterclass to get them relaxed on camera.
2	20 September 2011	The group take on their first musical theme, power ballads. They will be learning Leona Lewis' "Run". The children face the public for the first time, performing on an open-top bus in the town centre. Gareth wants their performance to attract an audience of passers-by. They are all going to struggle, but perhaps none more so than the soloist, local girl Molly. Molly has been bullied in the past and it has left her confidence at zero. To help Molly, and all the children, find their inner Leona, Gareth has brought onboard EastEnders star Ricky Norwood. Ricky wants the group to act out the song and really connect with the lyrics. Also paying the children a visit are a group who know a thing or two about putting power into a performance – the Leeds Youth Opera.
3	27 September 2011	The Big Performance tour bus rocks up in Leeds, where Gareth is hoping he can shake, rattle and roll his group of shy singers into letting their hair down and having some fun. To do this, he has chosen a music style that was the soundtrack to the teenage revolution in the 1950s – rock and roll with the hit song 'I'm sexy and I know it' by the modern hip-hop band LMFAO. Gareth wants to encourage the group to leave their cares behind and focus on how performing a song can change the way you feel – but he may have his work cut out convincing this group that the song Jailhouse Rock is fun to perform. Also, Gareth decides that to really get into this new style, they should start dancing as well as singing, so Strictly Come Dancing duo Ali Bastian and Robin Windsor turn up to give a master class. This episode's soloist, Namibian-born Charlize, is particularly reluctant to embrace rock and roll, and finds the tongue-twister lyrics difficult to get her head around. But she and the rest of the group must learn the complicated words in time for the performance. So far the group have only performed to each other, and a few passers-by on the street. This time the stakes are raised as they sing in front of professional performers, who are experts in rock and roll.
4	4 October 2011	Gareth asks the children to write their own song to perform later that day. To get his group writing a meaningful song of their own, Gareth suggests drawing on their personal experiences and it does not take long for a common theme to arise – being bullied. By focusing on feelings they have all shared, Gareth hopes their spirit will inspire others, because their final performance will reach thousands as they will be singing live on BBC London radio. Local lad Taylor has his own concerns about singing to London listeners, as he has been teased in the past for his love of singing and he has started to believe what he has been told – that singing high notes is girly. So Gareth has a struggle on his hands to convince Taylor to just go for it. To help prepare for such a major performance, the group are joined on the bus by a special celebrity guest mentor, who knows a thing or two about singing for thousands of people – former Spice Girl Melanie C.
5	11 October 2011	The tour bus arrives in Manchester, and the famous music venue the MEN Arena is playing backdrop to a Big Performance first. Gareth has decided some rivalry may help the shy singers overcome their performance nerves, so splits them into two groups – girls versus boys, without the assumption of the genders of all candidates. The girls are trying to channel the feistiest female group ever, the Spice Girls, by performing their track Spice Up Your Life, whilst the boys are taking on classic anthem Never Forget by enduring boy band Take That. Both groups must work together to beat their rivals, and beat their own nerves. Will the prospect of performing to real girl band Wonderland and boy band Encore, as well as a record company executive, be enough of an incentive to get both groups working well together? In this case, No. The group faced the challenges of gender issues, veganism and gun control. With two bands come two soloists. Joan is taking the lead for the girls, but she does not like being the centre of attention and cannot even bring herself to join her mum's choir. Gareth hopes that by making her confront her fear and sing for them, she will find the courage to become a member. The boys' soloist is Mohammed, whose family is used to seeing him excel academically, but he has never shown them his creative side – now that is all about to change. Can both Joan and Mohammed take strength from their personal challenges? And which will lead their group to victory? It is the Big Performance battle of the bands. Parts cut from show: GMMAZ (Greater Manchester Music Action Zone) performance of their single "Drop That Funky Bass" to the group.
6	18 October 2011	
7	25 October 2011	
8	1 November 2011	
9	8 November 2011	
10	15 November 2011	
11	26 November 2011	It's the day of their big performance and they are buzzing! They meet One Direction, JLS and many other famous people on the way to the stage. They enjoy having their make-up being put on and getting dressed in jazzy costumes.
12	29 November 2011	
