= The Choir: Sing While You Work =

UK television series

- Country of origin: United Kingdom
- Original language: English
- No. of series: 2
- No. of episodes: 14

Production
- Running time: 60 minutes
- Production company: twentytwenty

Original release
- Network: BBC Two
- Release: 20 September 2012 – present

The Choir: Sing While You Work is a British television show broadcast on BBC Two, a spinoff of the 2006 series The Choir. In Sing While You Work choirmaster Gareth Malone creates and trains amateur workplace-based choirs, ultimately to compete against one another. The series first aired in 2012 and began a second series in November 2013.

== Format ==
In Series 1 cameras followed Gareth Malone as he created four amateur choirs, formed from employees of four very different workplaces. Malone auditioned potential choir members at their workplace, assembled a choir of 30 using some of the better singers, then trained the singers to a semi-professional standard in only a few weeks. In contrast to previous The Choir formats, Sing While You Work introduces a competitive element. While the early programmes followed the early days of each choir, the final two programmes of Series 1 consisted of a semi-final and a final competitive event when an overall winner was eventually chosen.

In Series 2 the number of choirs was increased to five, while the size of each choir is reduced to 22. A quarter final stage is introduced.

The winners and losers are chosen by a panel of three musical experts.

== Series 1 (2012) ==
=== Participants ===
Lewisham and Greenwich NHS Trust
Bristol Royal Mail
Manchester Airport
Severn Trent Water

In Series 1 each choir consisted of 30 singers. Manchester airport choir were eliminated at the semi-final stage. The three remaining groups performed for the final at the National Eisteddfod of Wales in Llangollen. Severn Trent Water choir won the final.

=== Judges ===
Ralph Allwood, Manvinder Rattan, Ruby Turner

=== Transmissions ===
Episode	Workplace	Airdate
1	Lewisham and Greenwich NHS Trust	20 September 2012
2	Royal Mail Bristol	27 September 2012
3	Manchester Airport	4 October 2012
4	Severn Trent Water	11 October 2012
5	SEMI-FINAL	18 October 2012
6	FINAL	25 October 2012

== Series 2 (2013) ==
=== Participants ===
P&O Ferries - the choir was drawn from P&O staff in Dover and Calais, with singing in both English and French.
Birmingham City Council - played against the background of major budget cuts in the council. The choir's first major performance is in Birmingham Museum & Art Gallery in front of colleagues, friends and the judges.
Sainsbury's - using staff from a store in Walthamstow, the Waltham Point distribution centre, and the Store Support Centre in London.
Cheshire Fire Service
Citibank, London

The quarter final was held at the Royal Academy of Music, where each choir had to perform a piece of classical music. Sainsbury's choir, singing Ave Maria, were eliminated at this stage.

The semi final was held at El Shaddai Church in Golders Green, each choir performed a gospel song. Birmingham City Council Choir were next to fall from the competition. They sang 'Down to the River to Pray'.

The grand final was filmed during the last week of September in Ely Cathedral, to be broadcast on 22 December 2013. P&O Ferries were crowned winners in front of an audience of 1.200 people.

=== Judges ===
Paul Mealor (royal composer), Sarah Fox (singer), Ken Burton (conductor)

=== Transmissions ===
Episode	Workplace	Airdate
1	P&O Dover and Calais	4 November 2013
2	Birmingham City Council	11 November 2013
3	Sainsbury's Walthamstow	18 November 2013
4	Cheshire Fire and Rescue Service	25 November 2013
5	CitiBank	2 December 2013
6	QUARTER FINAL	9 December 2013
7	SEMI FINAL	16 December 2013
8	FINAL	22 December 2013

== Reception ==
Viewing figures increased for the 2013 series. 2.7 million people watched the first programme on 4 November 2013, up 200,000 on the 2012 opener.

=== Media criticism ===
The first programme of the initial series, following the fortunes of the Lewisham NHS trust choir, was warmly received. The Telegraph described it as "an emotive piece of television, in the best possible way" and a "pleasurable programme", its only criticism being the "slightly heavy-handed attempt to shoehorn in a bit of hospital-based class warfare". The Guardian reviewer described Malone as "slightly annoying" but admitted the programme melted any cynicism and left him "blubbing like one of those babies on the neonatal ward".

A controversy over editing emerged during the first season when a member of the Lewisham NHS trust choir, Eddie Chaloner, complained that he had been presented in a "misleading" and "mendacious" way. Mark Lawson of The Guardian commented: "There's no doubt producer-director Pete Cooksley has imposed a storyline on the documentary." However, he concluded that Sing While You Work "is a fascinating debate about the role of the heart in different arts. It is enjoyable general viewing but could be a useful teaching aid in medical schools."

In 2013 Sameer Rahim of The Telegraph described the programmes as "patronising" and "drawn out and manipulative – a knock-off version of a great original", giving it two out of five stars. Ellen Jones of The Independent commented that the show emphasised team spirit so was "a bit light on the kind of 'characters' who entertain in other reality talent shows. Of the P&O choir she said "Individually, none of the choir members would make it to the stage in a Wetherspoon's karaoke competition, yet, together, they can transform a cheesy disco number into something almost sacred". Of the Cheshire Fire and Rescue Service choir she highlighted their rendition of Bruce Springsteen's The Rising as "the most moving moment in the whole series".

== Aftermath ==
Bristol's Royal Mail choir have been used by Royal Mail to promote their stamps, in October 2012 to launch the Christmas stamps and in April 2013, when they released a charity single version of Abide with Me (with Joe McElderry) to promote a set of footballer-themed stamps and raise money for Prostate Cancer UK.

In December 2013, Lewisham NHS Trust choir (from Series 1) released a charity single, Bridge Over You, hoping it would reach Number 1 in the Christmas charts. In December 2015, they released the single yet again in an attempt to reach Christmas Number 1, this time succeeding.

In December 2015, all choirs met again at BBC Two's Gareth Malone's Great Choir Reunion.

In February 2016, Cheshire Fire and Rescue Service Choir (from Series 2) performed The Rising at Ground Zero Plaza and Carnegie Hall.

CitiBank Choir (from Series 2) also keeps singing, they won Office Choir of the Year 2016 Final on 10 February 2016.
