= Flesh & Blood (song) =

Single by Invictus Games Choir & Gareth Malone
- Released: 13 May 2016
- Length: 3:36
- Label: Decca
- Songwriter(s): Gareth Malone

Music video
- "Flesh & Blood" on YouTube

"Flesh & Blood" is a song by the Invictus Games Choir and Gareth Malone. It was released as a single in 2016 and peaked at number 29 on the UK Singles Chart.

== Background ==
The Invictus Choir was put together by choirmaster Gareth Malone, originally a group of 12 wounded ex-armed service personnel, to perform at the 2016 Invictus Games. Malone had previously been responsible for forming the Military Wives choir, as well as The Choir, a series where he inspired a group of teenagers with no singing experience to perform in public.

A two-part BBC documentary was broadcast in May 2016, showing the formation of the choir, their journey to the Invictus Games and the recording of their charity single, "Flesh & Blood". The single was released on 13 May 2016, following the choir's standout performance at the Invictus Games opening ceremony, with Decca Records announcing that all profits would be donated to help military charities, and at least 40p from every digital download going towards the Invictus Games Foundation charity.

The lyrics for the song were inspired by the service personnel's experiences of war, and the other song on the double-A side, "Invicible" written by Laura Wright, was also inspired by the Invictus Games.

== Legacy ==
The choir performed together several times in the years after their formation, including the following year at the 100th 'Army v Navy' rugby union match at Twickenham and in 2018 they took to the stage at Classic FM Live, alongside the Royal Philharmonic Orchestra and the National Youth Choir of Great Britain.

Four years after "Flesh & Blood" reached number 29 in the UK, the Invictus Games Choir reunited to collaborate with American rock group Bon Jovi for another charity recording. The group, who had expanded to 50 members at the end of 2017, recorded the song, entitled "Unbroken", at the legendary Abbey Road Studios, with Invictus Games founder Prince Harry also in attendance to witness the spectacle.

== Charts ==
Chart (2016)	Peak position
UK Singles (OCC)	29
