= South Oxhey =

Estate in Hertfordshire, England

Coordinates: 51.62029°N 0.39082°W

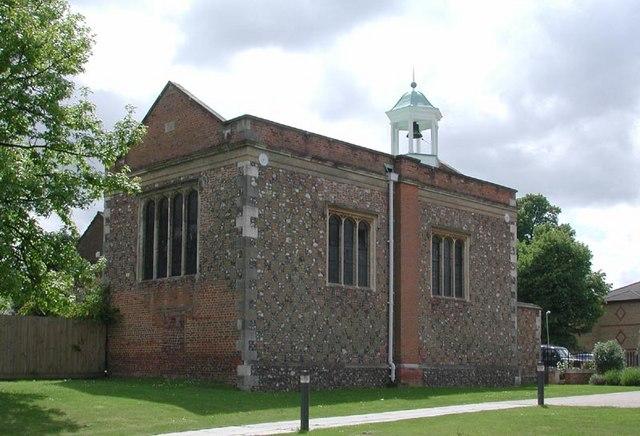
- Oxhey Chapel

- Location within Hertfordshire
- OS grid reference: TQ115925
- District: Three Rivers
- Shire county: Hertfordshire
- Region: East
- Country: England
- Sovereign state: United Kingdom
- Post town: WATFORD
- Postcode district: WD19
- Dialling code: 020
- Police: Hertfordshire
- Fire: Hertfordshire
- Ambulance: East of England
- UK Parliament: South West Hertfordshire

South Oxhey is an estate in the Watford Rural parish of the Three Rivers district of Hertfordshire, England. It is located in the south western corner of Hertfordshire and close to the boundary with Greater London. At the 2011 Census South Oxhey's population was included in the Northwick Ward of Three Rivers Council.

South Oxhey is in the postcode district WD19, however, a thin section of the HA5 postcode district protrudes northwards and encompasses a small part of Oxhey Woods. Although, this is a technicality and is not significant due to the area of HA5 being woodland, with no housing.

== History ==
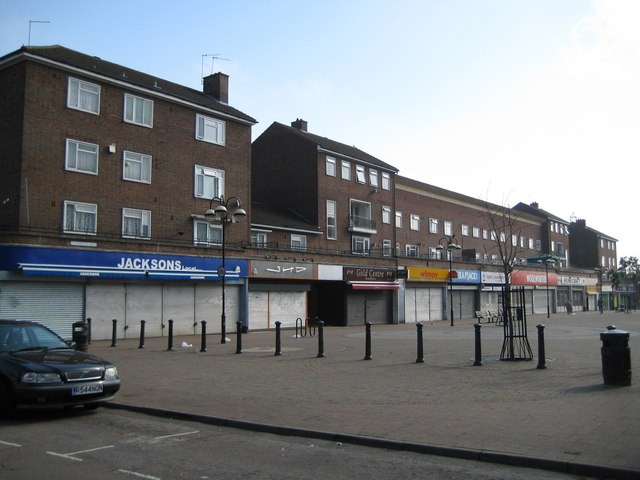
The main shopping precinct in South Oxhey town centre

South Oxhey is a large estate built on land that was formerly part of the Oxhey Hall Estate. There was a manor house here, Oxhey Place, and a chapel. The manor house was owned by the Blackwell family of Crosse and Blackwell fame. It burnt down in 1960. Oxhey Chapel dates from 1612 and is still standing to the south of the parish church of All Saints. The church was opened in 1954 to serve the new estate built after the Second World War by the London County Council. The church was demolished and rebuilt in 2000.

Since the introduction of the nationwide Right to buy policy in 1980, many South Oxhey residents have bought their homes from the local council, meaning that by 2007, some 70% of houses on the estate are privately owned. The estate was built after the Second World War to help alleviate the housing pressures thrust upon London during the Blitz as well as general inadequate housing, with prisoners of war assisting in the construction of some buildings. South Oxhey was originally built and managed by the London County Council and later the Greater London Council. In 1980 the ownership and management of the estate was transferred from the GLC to Three Rivers District Council. Following changes to financial regulations in 2008, the remaining social housing was transferred to Thrive Homes housing association.

== South Oxhey Choirs ==
South Oxhey featured in the BBC television series The Choir: Unsung Town which was first broadcast on BBC Two on 1 September 2009. The programme featured a project by Gareth Malone to assemble a community choir in the town by recruiting local residents and encouraging them to take part. A legacy of the programme was the foundation of two groups, the South Oxhey Community Choir and the South Oxhey Youth Choir.

As part of the TV series, the choirs performed at venues including the Watford Colosseum, St Albans Abbey, and headlining at Sox Fest '09 in May 2009. In April 2009, the Community Choir made their debut recording at Abbey Road Studios.

Gareth Malone continued as choirmaster for two years following the conclusion of the TV recording and now maintains his support as patron. The current musical director is Simon Wookey and both the Community and Youth choirs continue to make regular performances about three to four times per year at events around Hertfordshire and the South East of England.

== Notable people of South Oxhey ==
- Nick Moran - actor and director
- Paul Field - two-time Winter Olympian from South Oxhey, raised in Hemel Hempstead.

== Transport ==
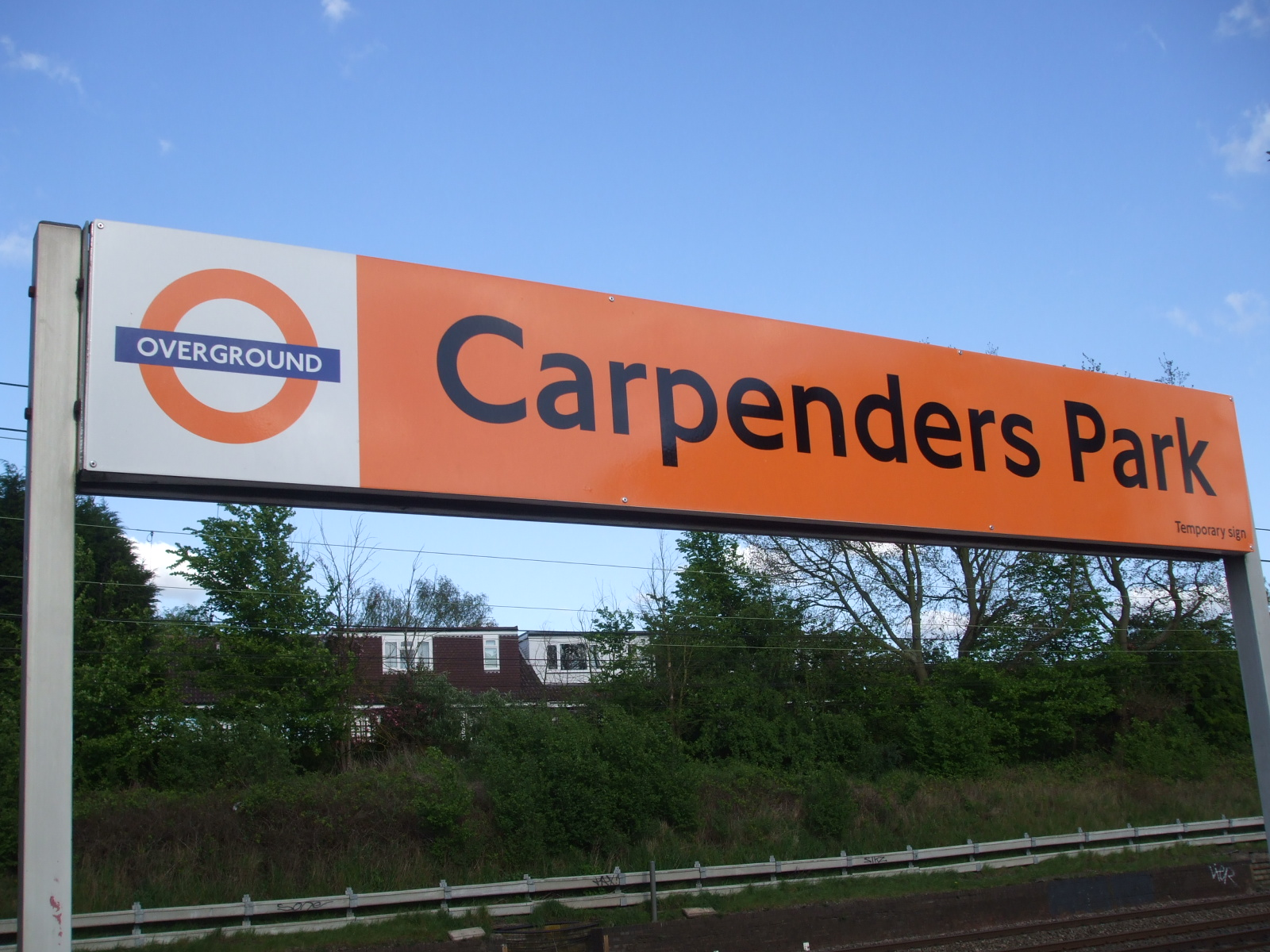
Carpenders Park station

South Oxhey is served by London Overground rail services from Carpenders Park railway station which is on the Watford DC Line. Trains run from Watford Junction to London Euston every 15 minutes (every 30 minutes in the morning during weekends) in either direction. Until 1982, Carpenders Park was part of the London Underground network, on the Bakerloo line.

A number of bus routes pass through South Oxhey. Buses are managed by Hertfordshire County Council's Intalink transport service. One service is provided by Red Rose Travel: The No. 328 runs from Northwood (Mount Vernon Hospital) to Watford running along Fairfield Avenue, Gosforth Lane and Hayling Road - the route vacated by the cessation of the 503 service. In addition, there are two limited 'shopper' services; The R16 to North Watford and R17 Hatch End both operated by Red Eagle. The southern part of South Oxhey is also served by the 346, operated by Red Rose Travel, running between Northwood (Mount Vernon Hospital) and Watford via Carpenders Park, Oxhey Village.

== Schools ==
- Colnbrook (Special Needs School)
- Greenfields
- Oxhey Wood
- St. Josephs Roman Catholic School
- Warren Dell Primary
- Woodhall Primary

South Oxhey has no secondary schools. However, from the early 1950s, there were two Secondary modern schools – Clarendon, on Chilwell Gardens, and the smaller Hampden School, on Little Oxhey Lane. Built to cater for post-war conditions both schools eventually combined to form Sir James Altham Comprehensive (upper and lower schools). Three Rivers Council sold off the School Land to developers. Now a shortage of School places in Hertfordshire has left South Oxhey as the furthest Town from a secondary School in Herts.

== Future developments ==
In 2012, the Three Rivers District Council proposed a redevelopment of the local shopping and business area known as 'The Precinct'. The initiative was devised after 130 flats between Fairfield Avenue and Oxhey Drive were identified by the council as being beyond repair and in need of replacing. However many residents were against the idea of knocking down the old Precinct favouring refurbishment of the existing buildings. Many of the local shop keepers formed a pressure group against a full redevelopment.

In November 2013, political support for the South Oxhey Initiative fractured as the local Conservative Party withdrew their backing for the regeneration scheme. This followed the decision by two housing associations to pull their support as development partners. One of the main areas of political disagreement is the level of social housing to be included in the proposed development. In January 2014, Three Rivers Council announced that they intend to continue with submitting an outline planning application in June 2014, in the hope that a developer will show interest in the scheme after planning permission has been granted.

In 2016 Three Rivers District Council and development partner Countryside Properties announced they had entered into an agreement to redevelop central South Oxhey. The proposals for the regeneration include 514 new homes, as well as retail and public spaces. Work is planned for three phases, with the overall development planned for completion in 2022.

Work began in late 2016, and is underway at the former Jet public house site on Hayling Road, Maylands/ Ferndown Road and Hallowes Crescent..

== Healthcare ==
South Oxhey has a number of doctors surgeries based on Oxhey Drive, the largest being The Consulting Rooms. Since the onset of Clinical Commissioning Groups in 2013, services have been expanded to include the wider community, enabling patients to have more choice in their care.

== Nature reserve ==
Oxhey Woods Local Nature Reserve is on the western border of South Oxhey.

== Oxhey Jets Football Club ==
Oxhey Jets football club were established in 1972 as a boys' team, eventually moving to the local Watford leagues when they became a men's team. The club are now in the Spartan South Midlands League Premier Division and made their debut in the FA Cup during the 2005–06 season.
