= The Voyage (opera) =

1992 opera by Philip Glass

- Opera by Philip Glass
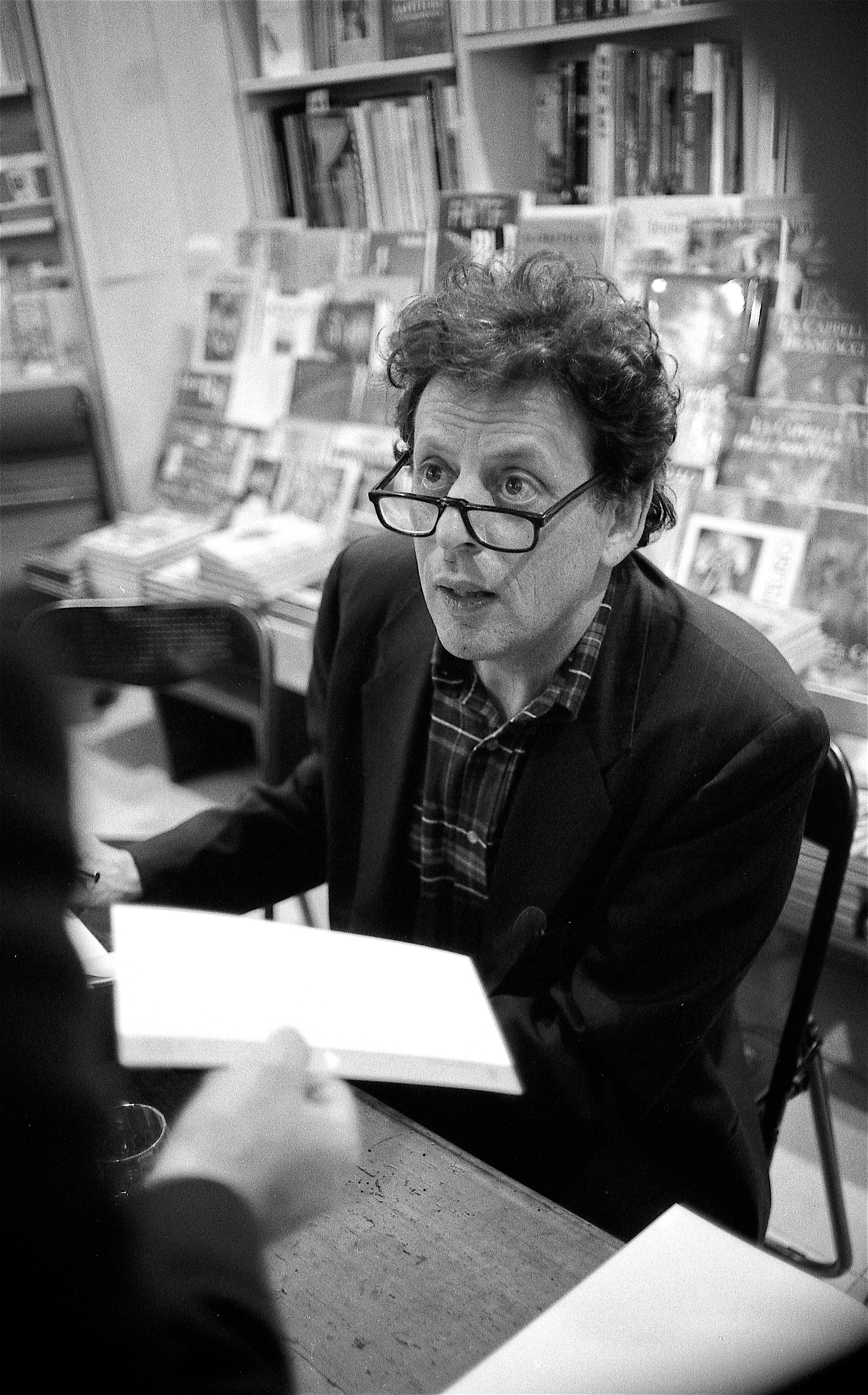
- Glass in 2006
- Librettist: David Henry Hwang
- Language: English; Latin; Spanish
- Based on: Christopher Columbus discovering the Americas
- Premiere: October 12, 1992; Metropolitan Opera, New York

The Voyage is an opera in three acts (plus a prologue and an epilogue) by the American composer Philip Glass. The English/Latin/Spanish libretto was written by David Henry Hwang.

The work was commissioned by the Metropolitan Opera, New York City, and first performed there on October 12, 1992 (that date being the 500th anniversary of Christopher Columbus discovering the Americas). The British premiere was in Leeds, England, performed by Leeds Youth Opera, with Johnathon Clift and Mike Williamson as the directors, with Richard Pascoe and Alex Simpson playing Columbus.

== Roles ==
Role	Voice type	Premiere Cast, October 12, 1992 (Conductor: Bruce Ferden)
Columbus	bass-baritone	Timothy Noble
Isabella	mezzo-soprano	Tatiana Troyanos
Scientist/First Mate	tenor	Douglas Perry
Commander	soprano	Patricia Schuman
Ship's Doctor/Space Twin 1	soprano	Kaaren Erickson
Second Mate/Space Twin 2	bass	Julien Robbins
Earth Twin 1	mezzo-soprano	Jane Shaulis
Earth Twin 2	bass	Jan Opalach

== Synopsis ==
Glass did not want to create a biographical opera about Columbus, especially in a year when there were countless films, documentaries and other events doing the same job. Instead he opted to make his opera a more general study of exploration – of the oceans, of space and time and of the mind. Columbus remains a central character though, appearing in the second act and the epilogue.

=== Prologue ===
We see a scientist in a wheelchair (reminding us of Professor Stephen Hawking), pondering time and space. He sings that despite man's inadequate mind, body and technology, the will to explore and follow one's vision "towards holes on the horizon" has always existed. Meanwhile, the chorus poses eternal questions about time and space repeatedly, growing in volume and intensity.

=== Act 1 ===
Above an ice-age Earth, a spacecraft hurtles through space out of control. Its occupants are frantic; the Commander sings that nothing on the ship works properly, whilst the rest of the crew call out the ship's status and instrument readings. They see that the planet they are passing can support life, and they decide to make for it. As they await the inevitable crash landing, they recall moments from their lives. They survive the crash and decide to split up, each taking with them one of the "directional crystals" from the ship. Any two of these crystals will, when brought together, indicate the course back to the crew's home planet. The crew consider their new home and what sort of world they would like to live in; each has their own markedly different ideal world. The Commander leaves the wrecked ship to see what awaits her. Outside, she is met by a group of natives that dance a rite of spring and imagine the Commander to be a fantastic god descended from the sky. They sweep her up and she goes with them, becoming part of their celebration.

=== Act 2 ===
Spain, 1492

Columbus is at the court of Queen Isabella bidding them farewell as he prepares to set sail for the Indies. He is promised untold riches and power on his return. Suddenly this scene fades and we realise that we are aboard Columbus' ship; he has been reminiscing about his departure. It is the 32nd day of the voyage. Doubts are beginning to set in as they sail the endless blue ocean. Isabella appears to him in a vision and reminds him of the faith of Noah and of the Virgin Mary and tells him to hold fast to his faith. She promises him that by seeing the journey through he will further the kingdom of God, as well as gain riches and power. Suddenly the First Mate shouts that he has sighted land.

=== Act 3 ===
Year 2092

In a space station above the Earth, two astronomers ("Space Twins") scan for signs of life in the cosmos. At the same time, on the Earth, two archeologists (the "Earth Twins") have discovered two of the Directional Crystals from the ship that crashed thousands of years earlier. As they bring the crystals together, their scanning equipment homes in on the planet from which the space travellers in Act I originated. A mission to travel to the planet is begun and we see a terrific celebration as the ship prepares for launch, with dignitaries, politicians, dancers, musicians and a large crowd of well-wishers. The explorers enter the ship and bid farewell to their loved ones. The ship blasts off and another journey of discovery begins.

=== Epilogue ===
1506

We see Columbus on his deathbed. Monks chant around him and Isabella appears to accompany the explorer on his final journey into the unknown. (She has already passed on to that realm herself). He accuses her of breaking her promises to him but she claims that he undertook his voyage for pride and vanity, guided by Lucifer. Even so, she offers herself to him but he rejects her, saying that the journey he is about to undergo is far more seductive. Pondering man's eternal quest for knowledge and exploration, he is transported up to the stars.

The libretto is published as part of Trying to Find Chinatown: The Selected Plays of David Henry Hwang by Theatre Communications Group.

== Recording ==
In July 2006, a long-awaited complete recording of the opera became available on Glass' Orange Mountain Music label, based on the staging by the Landestheater Linz (Austria) and conducted by Dennis Russell Davies.
