= Animateur =

Musical professional

An animateur is a musical professional whose role is to engage audiences with a new or unfamiliar form of music, "bringing it to life" beyond what might be expected in a traditional performance.

== Overview ==
The role of animateur developed from the French concept of "animation socio-culturelle" and first became established in the 1980s as musical outreach activities were being formalised in the UK. Because the role has roots in the United Kingdom, they are most common in the English-speaking world.

While an animateur is likely to have some skill in performance (with voice or instrument), conducting, teaching and possibly composition or arrangement, their principal role is to assist the communication of the performers and the audience. If working with a symphony orchestra, for instance, they might accomplish this through running participatory workshops to introduce audience members to aspects of the music to be performed, or by facilitating dialogue between performers and audience members.

There are animateurs in a wide number of musical styles. While they are probably most common in classical music, they also work in jazz, gamelan and some forms of African traditional music. Often they are employed by an orchestra, concert hall or music education service, though some also work freelance accepting commissions from groups or organisations for a specific occasion. Animateurs also work with children (where the discipline can approach a form of musical youth work) as well as adults. Possibly the best known animateur in the United Kingdom is Gareth Malone, who for some years ran the youth and community choirs at the London Symphony Orchestra's music education center, LSO St Luke's prior to applying the same skills in a series of television programmes.
