= Ken Burton =

British musician

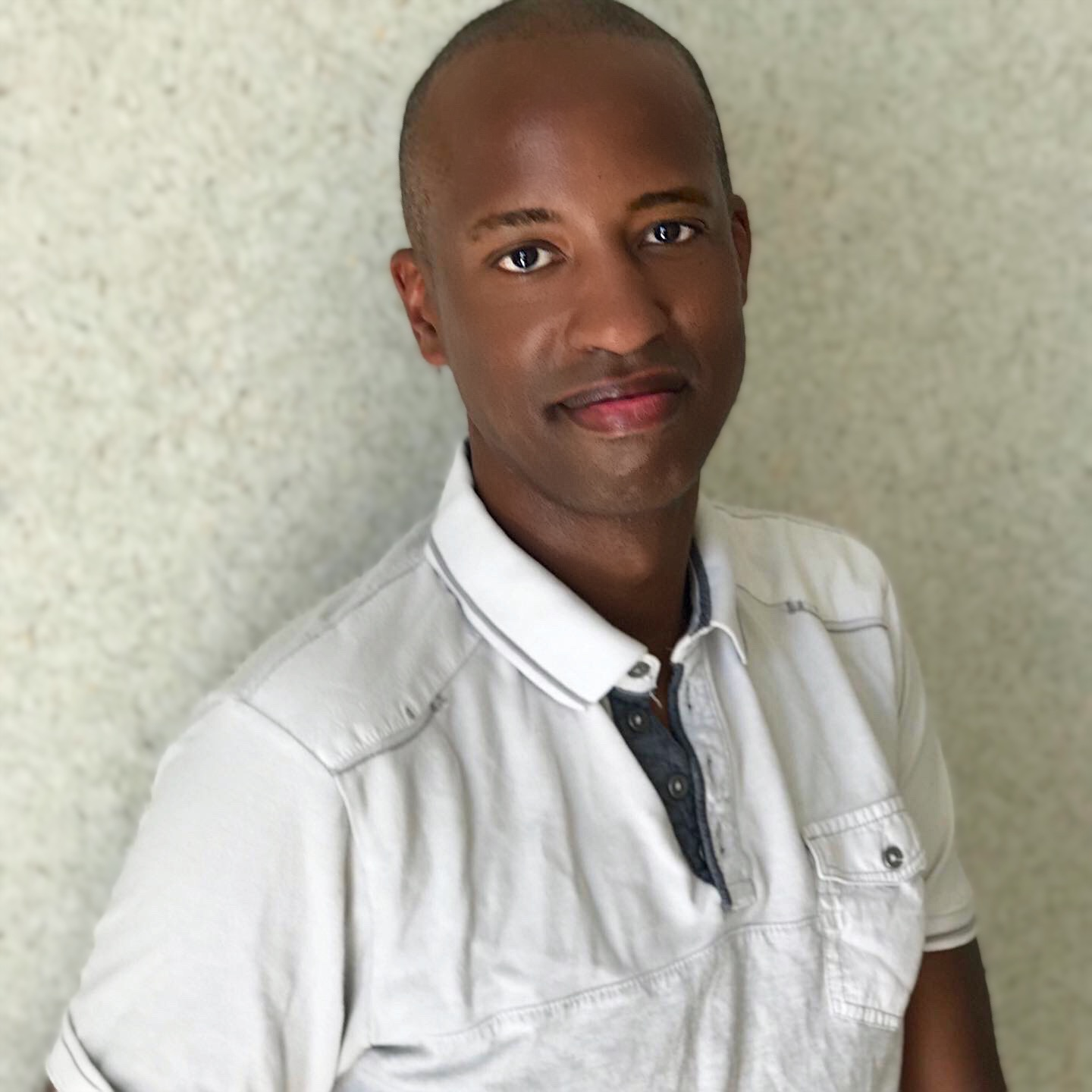

Background information
- Born: January 5, 1970 (age 56)
- Occupations: music director, conductor, composer
- Website: kenburton.com

Ken Burton (born 5 January 1970) is a British choral and orchestral conductor, composer, performer, producer, presenter, arranger and judge, widely known for his work and appearances on UK television programmes, particularly BBC1 Songs Of Praise, on which he appears regularly as a conductor, musical director, arranger, singer, judge, music producer, and music consultant. He has conducted and directed choirs for major films, including the multi Oscar winning and Grammy winning Marvel film Black Panther, Black Panther 2: Wakanda Forever, Candy Cane Lane (Amazon) Holiday Road (Hallmark), is one of the credited choral conductors on the film Jingle Jangle and has also contributed as a conductor, contractor, and singer to a number of other films including Amazing Grace, and Ugly Dolls.

== Biography ==
Burton's parents relocated from the West Indies to the United Kingdom in the 1960s, and he attributes his love for music to early childhood home experiences, which included listening to older siblings rehearse their instruments, and family spiritual gatherings, where singing would take place, often in harmony. He attended the Ryelands Primary School in South Norwood, where he was actively involved with music, including playing in the newly formed steel band. His participation in the steel band was the subject of a local newspaper feature on his music-making activity. He went on to become a choirmaster, specialising in gospel music at the church he attended, the Selhurst Seventh-Day Adventist Church. He is still an active member of that church, and still directs the choir. He then went on to Trinity School, Croydon, on a music scholarship, pursuing 9 O-levels, and 3 A levels, and thereafter pursued his professional academic music studies at Goldsmiths College, University Of London, which is now named Goldsmiths University. His studies included music analysis, techniques, composition, music production, performance, Classical music history, and post 1945 twentieth-century music. Whilst at the college, he won a prize for the highest marks in aural perception, and was regularly used as an accompanist for instrumentalists, and the chorus. Following graduation, he was invited back to Goldsmiths as chorus master, and director of the chamber choir.

Burton's choirs first gained national attention in 1994 when The London Adventist Chorale and the Croydon Seventh-Day Adventist Gospel Choir were two of the three finalists in the Sainsbury's Choir of the Year competition, broadcast nationally in the UK on BBC television. The London Adventist Chorale won that year. His choral activities also involves directorship of BBC Songs of Praise session choir, Adventist Vocal Ensemble (AVE). Burton also formed, and performs with, the group Tessera, also a regular on BBC Songs of Praise.

As a conductor, singer, and instrumentalist, he has performed on many of the world's major stages including Wembley Stadium, Universal Studios (Florida), Sydney Opera House and the Royal Albert Hall. His orchestral music has been played by several of the UK's leading orchestras, among them BBC Orchestra and CBSO, and in programmes including the BBC Proms.

He has worked as a musical director, arranger, and collaborator with opera singers Bryn Terfel and Lesley Garrett, gospel singers Donnie McClurkin, Andraé Crouch and Helen Baylor, and has worked as a session musician for the UK's largest television show, The X Factor, and the The X Factor USA. He has contracted choirs, recorded soundtrack choral parts (some of them his own arrangements) for leading artists including Beyoncé, Christina Aguilera, will.i.am, Robbie Williams, and Leona Lewis.

In 2010, he was asked to assist in shaping an arrangement for a song of Lord Andrew Lloyd Webber. This song was to be a gospel flavoured arrangement of Webber's "Love Never Dies", to be recorded by Nicole Scherzinger. The song was subsequently recorded, produced by Nigel Wright, with choral arrangements by Annie Skates. Burton provided the choir.

In 2007, he was commissioned to write a piece of music for double chorus, for a BBC Radio commemorative broadcast to commemorate the bicentenary of the Abolition of the Slave Trade Act. This piece was performed by the London Adventist Chorale and the choir of St John's College, Cambridge. A number of other collaborative pieces were written and subsequently recorded by the two choirs, although to date the recording has not been released.

Burton has produced a number of recordings with the Croydon Seventh-Day Adventist Gospel Choir, the first being a selection of songs titled "Until We Reach".

Burton has been presented to Queen Elizabeth II on five occasions: two Commonwealth days, Golden Jubilee 2002 (where he directed the London Adventist Chorale singing two of his arrangements of African-American spirituals at Buckingham Palace), the re-opening of the Royal Festival Hall Royal Gala Concert, and at a special jubilee multi-faith environment programme. All three of the choral entities he looks after (The Croydon SDA Gospel Choir, London Adventist Chorale and Adventist Vocal Ensemble) have performed, either uniquely or in collaboration, for numerous concerts attended by Her Majesty The Queen and other members of the royal family. He has also been presented to the former Prince, now King, Charles on several occasions.

In February 2013, Ken Burton was a guest presenter for the BBC Radio 3 programme "The Choir". He presented a programme on choral gospel music which mixed with other genres.

In May 2013, he contracted a choir under the name Ken Burton Voices to perform at the Cannes Film Festival for Steven Spielberg, the head of the festival's 2013 jury. The choir performed "Miss Celie's Blues" from the film The Color Purple; the piece was arranged and conducted by jazz trumpeter Guy Barker; the lead vocalist was jazz singer Krystle Warren, and Grant Windsor was the accompanist.

Burton was a judge on the new eight-part series of BBC2's Sing While You Work, filmed in September 2013, with fellow judges Paul Mealor, and international soprano Sarah Fox.

In March 2014 Burton led the Hertford Choral Society's "Raise Your Voice" event.

In 2014 and 2015 he presented two series of programmes for online TV Channel LifeConnect. These programmes, called Music In My Life; With Ken Burton, saw him interviewing gospel artists, as well as talking about his own musical experiences. As part of the programme, in collaboration with the artist, he would create something on the spot.

In 2015, he headlined, and directed a workshop choir, in a sell-out concert at the NOSPR in Katowice. Later that year he travelled with his Croydon SDA Gospel Choir to perform at the quinquennial General Conference Of Seventh-Day Adventists, in San Antonio's Alamodome.

In 2016, he was a judge, alongside Connie Fisher and Katherine Jenkins, for the 2016 BBC Television short series of Songs Of Praise: School Choir Of The Year. Later that year he conducted his debut piece "No Many Could" number at the Proms, in a special gospel prom, presented by Michelle Williams of Destiny's Child.

In 2018, he was a judge, alongside Carrie Grant and JB Gill, for the 2018 BBC Television short series of Songs Of Praise; School Choir Of The Year.

Burton was approached to assemble and lead a choir of forty singers for the soundtrack of the Marvel film release Black Panther. Drawing largely from the professional British opera world, and others from the field of gospel, Jazz, and classical music, Burton was responsible for contracting, and generally advising in the recording sessions at London's Abbey Road Studios. The conductor for the film score was John Ashton Thomas. The composer was Ludwig Göransson. The film won several Oscars in 2019, including Best Soundtrack; the soundtrack also won a Grammy in 2019. The collective name for the choir Burton assembled was the Voquality Singers.

In 2019, Burton led a choir of twelve, in two BBC specials for Songs Of Praise, in the Holy Land. Featuring interviews, and songs, all arranged and produced by Burton, with one produced by both Ian Tilley and Burton,

In 2020, Burton was commissioned to write a new piece for the vocal ensemble Voces8. This was premiered in the group's Live From London virtual concert.

== Covid-19 programmes ==
The 2020 COVID-19 pandemic resulted in his European and UK touring and recording schedule being largely cancelled or put on hold. During the period when the UK was required to be on lockdown, Burton created a number of home-made programmes for his social media network. You're PUN-ished is a short home-produced video, using puns. Burton attributes his love of words to his late father, who was always playing with words, and also his language teachers in his secondary school who instilled a love for languages. He vividly remembers and often publicly shares about a moment in a German class where his German teacher started talking about a photograph and proceeded to use such phrases as "we will not focus on this any more, unless things develop further; so I shall close the shutter".

Burton also produced a series of twenty short videos, which were shared with his social media network under the title Daily Focus. These short programmes consisted of a text from the Bible, or a poem; this would be followed by a short prayer, and a short song, which would be a popularly known hymn, or one of Burton's own compositions. In the second to last and last week of the series, Burton started to get song ideas whilst filming, which he shared on the videos.

Burton also produced a series of audio greetings: short song compositions with messages. He had been doing this for a number of years for his siblings, and he decided to record a number of short thank you messages for key workers and the UK health services, using different genres of music, among them opera and reggae.

== Publications ==
In addition to his choral and vocal work, he has published several books with Oxford University Press (Christmas Spirituals for Choirs) and Faber Music(Feel the Spirit, 1996; Good News, 1998; Ready to Ride, 2000) and also has works published with Royal Schools Of Church Music. In 2014 he created the company Voquality, which also publishes some of his music.

== Education ==
Burton was educated at the Ryelands Primary School in South Norwood, London. During this time he learned piano initially under a local teacher, known only as Mrs Skull, and then under the late Margaret Carr (Singh), to whom Burton attributes his musicianship skills. He often shares how Mrs Singh would change the tune on her musical doorbell, and require Ken to name the key of the tune before allowing him into the house. At Ryelands School, Burton had music instruction under Mrs Shirley Hulme.

He gained a music scholarship to the prestigious Trinity School of John Whitgift in Croydon, Surrey. He gained O-levels in Combined Science, Music, French, German, English Language, English Literature, Mathematics, Biology and Religious Studies. He continued at the school, gaining A-levels in Music, French and German. At Trinity School he studied piano with the late David de Warrenne, and also learned violin under Stuart Robertson. Burton was an accompanist for the DW choir, which specialised in arrangements of music, by De Warrenne himself. His academic music studies were with Mr David Squibb, Mr Stephen Johns, and Mr Simon Marriott. The school also had an organ, and Burton had several years of organ lessons with John Shepherd.

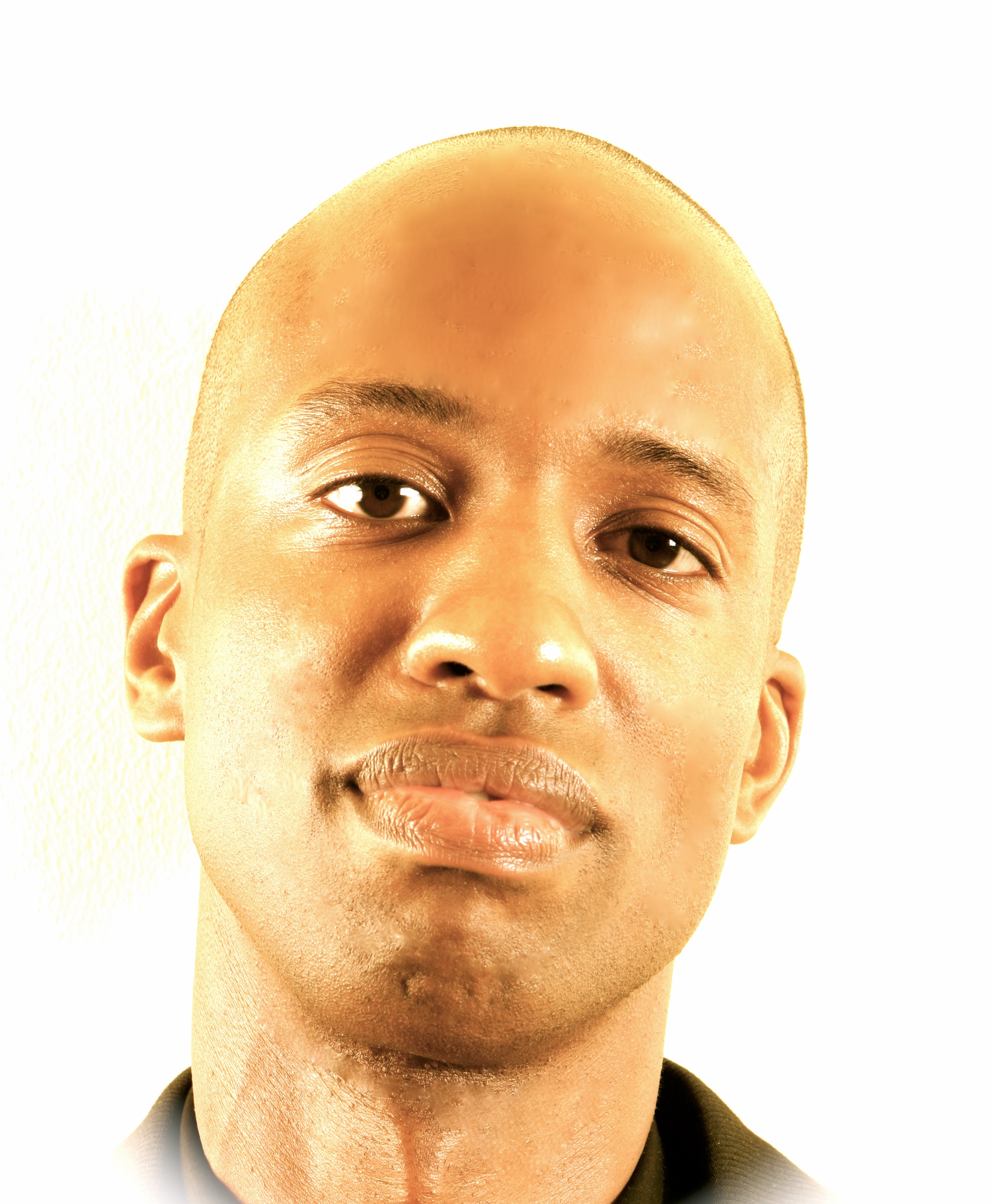

Following school, he read music at Goldsmiths College, University of London. He made history at the university by becoming the first music student to gain 100% in an aural examination, which won him a prize. At the university he was active as an accompanist for both vocalists and instrumentalists, due to his strong sight-reading skills. He studied piano under Professor Andrew Ball at the Royal College of Music, and studied voice under the tenor Charles Corp. Burton was also accompanist for the chorus and sang with the chamber choir. Following graduation, he was appointed as chorusmaster, training the choir in such works as the Verdi Requiem , Brahms Deutsches Requiem, Brahms Libeslieder, Bernstein Chichester Psalms and a newly discovered Prokofiev posthumous work.

Burton continued professional studies, undertaking an intensive Trinity College accredited professional course in voice education, studying voice technique, anatomy and care under Janice Chapman, professors Graham Welch, Colin Durrant, Thom Hans and Jacob Lieberman.

== Personal life ==
Burton is a Christian, of the Seventh-Day Adventist Church, and is father to one son: Kenán was born in March 2007. Burton is the youngest of 10 children; his oldest siblings were born in Jamaica, the eldest two living there. He is the brother of Professor Dr. Keith Augustus Burton, an author and former university professor at Oakwood Adventist University in Alabama, currently a professor at Advent Health Inc, in Florida. Dr Burton was a theology student at the university at the same time as members of Take Six. Burton's sister Vanessa resides in San Antonio, and is a recipient of the Texas Teacher of the Year Award.

== BBC Songs of Praise ==
Burton works regularly with Songs of Praise, one of the longest running music programmes on the United Kingdom's premier national television channel, BBC1.

On the programme, he has arranged, conducted and performed hundreds of songs. His arrangements have been for choirs, orchestras, ensembles and soloists, including Heather Small, Beverley Knight, Ruby Turner, Jermain Jackman, Ruthie Henshall, Donnie McClurkin, Eddi Reader, Shaun Escoffery, Aled Jones, Katherine Jenkins, Rick Astley, Tommy Blaize, Jaz Ellington, Mica Paris, Pumeza, Angel Blue and Laura Wright.

Programmes involved with since 2013:

SONGS OF PRAISE TELEVISION APPEARANCE SINCE 2013
Date	Year	Location	Song title	Role	Programme
March 29	2015	London	"Ride On King Jesus" (performed by Angel Blue)	Accompanist	Songs of Praise, BBC1
Apr 16	2017	Sheffield	"Trust Me", performed by Manchester Inspirational Voices	Accompanist	Songs of Praise, BBC1
May 14	2017	Sheffield	"Bring Us Closer", performed by Manchester Inspirational Voices	Accompanist	Songs of Praise, BBC1
Feb 5	2017	London	"Great Day" (performed by Noah Stewart)	Accompanist	Songs of Praise, BBC1
Dec 14	2014	London	"O Holy Night"	Arranger, performer	Songs of Praise, BBC1
June 22	2014	London	"He's Got The Whole World"	Arranger, conductor	Songs of Praise, BBC1
Sep 18	2014	London	"Go Tell It"	Arranger, conductor	Songs of Praise, BBC1
Dec 13	2015	London	"Angels from the Realms of Glory"	Arranger, conductor	Songs of Praise, BBC1
March 8	2015	London	"He's Got The Whole World"	Arranger, conductor	Songs of Praise, BBC1
March 22	2015	London	"He's The Lily Of The Valley"	Arranger, conductor	Songs of Praise, BBC1
Nov 22	2015	London	"Agnus Dei"	Arranger, conductor	Songs of Praise, BBC1
Oct 25	2015	London	"Leaning On The Everlasting Arms"	Arranger, conductor	Songs of Praise, BBC1
Aug 14	2016	Birmingham	"What A Mighty God"	Arranger, conductor	Songs of Praise, BBC1
Aug 28	2016	London	"I Will Enter"	Arranger, conductor	Songs of Praise, BBC1
Dec 11	2016	Birmingham	"Soon And Very Soon"	Arranger, conductor	Songs of Praise, BBC1
Jan 17	2016	London	"I Have Decided To Follow Jesus"	Arranger, conductor	Songs of Praise, BBC1
Jan 31	2016	London	"I Am On The Battlefield"	Arranger, Conductor	Songs of Praise, BBC1
Jul 31	2016	Birmingham	"Give Thanks"	Arranger, conductor	Songs of Praise, BBC1
Jun 05	2016	Birmingham	"Ten Thousand Reasons"	Arranger, conductor	Songs of Praise, BBC1
March 20	2016	Birmingham	"Nothing But The Blood"	Arranger, conductor	Songs of Praise, BBC1
March 27	2016	Birmingham	"See What A Morning"	Arranger, conductor	Songs of Praise, BBC1
May 8	2016	Birmingham	"Abide With Me"	Arranger, conductor	Songs of Praise, BBC1
May 22	2016	London	"Holy, Holy"	Arranger, conductor	Songs of Praise, BBC1
Nov 20	2016	Leicester	"What A Wonderful Change"	Arranger, conductor	Songs of Praise, BBC1
Oct 16	2016	London	"He’s Got The Whole World"	Arranger, conductor	Songs of Praise, BBC1
Sep 11	2016	Birmingham	"Shout To The Lord"	Arranger, conductor	Songs of Praise, BBC1
Sep 18	2016	Birmingham	"I Look To You"	Arranger, Conductor	Songs of Praise, BBC1
Apr 16	2017	Birmingham	"See What A Morning"	Arranger, conductor	Songs of Praise, BBC1
Apr 30	2017	Leicester	"O Praise Ye The Lord"	Arranger, Conductor	Songs of Praise, BBC1
Apr 9	2017	Leicester	"I Surrender All"	Arranger, conductor	Songs of Praise, BBC1
Feb 12	2017	Leicester	"I Will Sing The Wondrous Story"	Arranger, conductor	Songs of Praise, BBC1
Feb 19	2017	Birmingham	"My Jesus My Saviour (Shout To The Lord)"	Arranger, conductor	Songs of Praise, BBC1
Feb 5	2017	Birmingham	"I Love You Lord"	Arranger, conductor	Songs of Praise, BBC1
Jan 15	2017	Leicester	"Siyhamba"	Arranger, conductor	Songs of Praise, BBC1
Jan 22	2017	Birmingham	"What A Mighty God We Serve"	Arranger, conductor	Songs of Praise, BBC1
Jan 29	2017	London	"Give Me That Old Time Religion"	Arranger, conductor	Songs of Praise, BBC1
June 11	2017	Birmingham	"Wonderful Merciful"	Arranger, conductor	Songs of Praise, BBC1
June 18	2017	Leicester	"I Am Thine Oh Lord"	Arranger, Conductor	Songs of Praise, BBC1
June 25	2017	Leicester	"God Is Love His The Care"	Arranger, conductor	Songs of Praise, BBC1
June 25	2017	Birmingham	"This Train"	Arranger	Songs of Praise, BBC1
June 4	2017	Leicester	"Holy Holy Holy"	Arranger, conductor	Songs of Praise, BBC1
Mar 12	2017	London	"Here I Am To Worship"	Arranger, conductor	Songs of Praise, BBC1
Mar 19	2017	Leicester	"Kumbaya"	Arranger, conductor	Songs of Praise, BBC 1
Mar 26	2017	Leicester	"In Christ There Is No East Or West"	Arranger, conductor	Songs of Praise, BBC1
Mar 5	2017	Leicester	"All My Hope On God Is Founded"	Arranger, Conductor	Songs of Praise, BBC1
May 21	2017	Birmingham	"The Lord’s My Shepherd"	Arranger, conductor	Songs of Praise, BBC1
June 14	2015	London	"Faithful"	Arranger for Angel Blue & Tessera	Songs of Praise, BBC1
August 17	2014	London	"There's A Sweet Sweet Spirit"	Arranger, conductor	Songs of Praise, BBC1
Dec 06	2015	London	"The Virgin Mary Had A Baby Boy"	Arranger, conductor	Songs of Praise, BBC1
Dec 27	2015	London	"When A Child Is Born"	Arranger, conductor	Songs of Praise, BBC1
Sep 13	2015	London	"What A Friend"	Arranger, conductor	Songs of Praise, BBC1
April 17	2016	London	"What a Mighty God We Serve"	Arranger, conductor	Songs of Praise, BBC1
Aug 14	2016	London	"Power In The Blood"	Arranger, conductor	Songs of Praise, BBC1
Aug 21	2016	London	"People Get Ready" (with Heather Small)	Arranger, conductor	Songs of Praise, BBC1
Aug 28	2016	London	"To God Be Glory"	Arranger, conductor	Songs of Praise, BBC1
Dec 25	2016	London	"On Christmas Night"	Arranger, conductor	Songs of Praise, BBC1
Dec 4	2016	London	"When A Child Is Born" (with Shaun Escoffery)	Arranger, conductor	Songs of Praise, BBC1
Jan 24	2016	London	"Sing" (performed by Angel Blue)	Arranger, conductor	Songs of Praise, BBC1
Oct 1	2016	London	"To God Be The Glory"	Arranger, conductor	Songs of Praise, BBC1
Sep 25	2016	London	"There's A Sweet Sweet Spirit"	Arranger, conductor	Songs of Praise, BBC1
Apr 2	2017	Sheffield	"Praise Him"	Arranger, conductor	Songs of Praise, BBC1
Apr 23	2017	London	"Praise Him"	Arranger, conductor	Songs of Praise, BBC1
Feb 26	2017	London	"Praise Him Praise Him Jesus Our Blessed"	Arranger, Conductor Songs of Praise, BBC1	Songs of Praise, BBC1
JAN 1	2017	London	"To God Be The Glory"	Arranger, conductor	Songs of Praise, BBC1
July 16	2017	Sheffield	"Our God Reigns"	Arranger, conductor	Songs of Praise, BBC1
July 23	2017	London	"Every Time I Feel The Spirit"	Arranger, conductor	Songs of Praise, BBC1
July 9	2017	London	"Oh Happy Day"	Arranger, conductor	Songs of Praise, BBC1
June 25	2017	Sheffield	"Holy Overshadowing" (Graham Kendrick)	Arranger, conductor	Songs of Praise, BBC1
June 4	2017	Sheffield	"Here Is Love"	Arranger, conductor	Songs of Praise, BBC1
May 14	2017	Sheffield	"O Jesus I Have Promised"	Arranger, conductor	Songs of Praise, BBC1
May 28	2017	Sheffield	"There Is A Redeemer"	Arranger, conductor	Songs of Praise, BBC1
Dec 25	2014	London	"On Christmas Night" (Tessera)	Arranger, performer	Songs of Praise, BBC1
JAN 5	2014	Manchester	"What Child Is This"	Arranger, performer	Songs Of Praise, BBC1
March 9	2014	London	"You'll Never Walk Alone"	Arranger, performer	Songs of Praise, BBC1
February 16	2014	Bath	"Day By Day"	Arranger, performer	Songs of Praise, BBC1
Aug 02	2015	Manchester	"Tula Tula"	Arranger, performer	Songs of Praise, BBC1
Dec 18	2016	London	"What Child Is This?"	Arranger, performer	Songs of Praise, BBC1
Jan 18	2016	London	"Amazing Grace" (performed by Pumeza & Tessera)	Arranger, performer	Songs of Praise, BBC1
June 11	2017	Sheffield	"Make Me A Channel Of Your Peace"	Arranger, performer	Songs of Praise, BBC1
August 13	2017	London Abbey Road	"All You Need Is Love" (with Vocal Creation)	Arranger, performer/musical director	Songs of Praise, BBC1
Dec 21	2014	London	Christmas Big Sing: "O Come All Ye Faithful", performed by Jermaine Jackman	Arranger/Orchestrator	Songs of Praise, BBC1
July 6	2014	London	Big Sing: "And Can It Be"	Arranger/Orchestrator	Songs of Praise, BBC1
Oct 19	2014	London	Big Sing: "This Train", performed by Ruby Turner	Arranger/Orchestrator	Songs of Praise, BBC1
Oct 19	2014	London	Big Sing: "Precious Lord", performed by Mica Paris	Arranger/Orchestrator	Songs of Praise, BBC1
Oct 26	2014	London	Big Sing: "Lord You Are Good"	Arranger/Orchestrator	Songs of Praise, BBC1
Oct 26	2014	London	Big Sing: "Amazing Grace"	Arranger/Orchestrator	Songs of Praise, BBC1
Dec 20	2015	London	Christmas Big Sing: "Do You Hear What I Hear?" performed by Shaun Escoffery	Arranger/Orchestrator	Songs of Praise, BBC1
Dec 20	2015	London	Christmas Big Sing: "O Holy Night", performed by Ruby Turner	Arranger/Orchestrator	Songs of Praise, BBC1
May 31	2015	London	"Glory, Glory Hallelujah" (AVE/Angel Blue)	Choral Arranger	Songs of Praise, BBC1
June 29	2014	London	"Total Praise"	Conductor	Songs of Praise, BBC1
April 19	2015	London	"I Want Jesus To Walk With Me"	Conductor	Songs of Praise, BBC1
June 14	2015	London	"Love Lifted Me"	Conductor	Songs of Praise, BBC1
Nov 29	2015	London	"How Great Is Our God"	Conductor	Songs of Praise, BBC1
Oct 11	2015	London	"When We All Get To Heaven"	Conductor	Songs of Praise, BBC1
Feb 14	2016	London	"Blessed Assurance"	Conductor	Songs of Praise, BBC1
JAN 03	2016	London	"Praise Is Rising"	Conductor	Songs of Praise, BBC1
March 20	2016	London	"Hosanna In The Highest"	Conductor	Songs of Praise, BBC1
May 1	2016	London	"Blessed Assurance"	Conductor	Songs of Praise, BBC1
Nov 20	2016	London	"Nearer My God To Thee"	Conductor	Songs of Praise, BBC1
Sep 1	2016	London	"Beautiful One"	Conductor	Songs of Praise, BBC1
Dec 25	2016	London	Radio 2: Good Morning	Conductor, interviewee	Songs of Praise, BBC1
May 7	2017	Ilford	"Amazing Grace" - "My Chains Are Gone"	Congregational singer	Songs of Praise, BBC1
Jan 10	2016	London	Gospel COTY launch	Interviewee	Songs of Praise, BBC1
Oct 23	2016	London	Gospel Choir Of The Year: Preview (Talking Head)	Interviewee	Songs of Praise, BBC1
August 13	2017	London Abbey Road	Interview	Interviewee	Songs of Praise, BBC1
Oct 13	2013	London	Gospel Choir Of The Year	Music Adviser	Songs of Praise, BBC1
Oct 6	2013	London	Gospel Choir Of The Year	Music Adviser	Songs of Praise, BBC1
Dec 7	2014	London	"Soon And Very Soon (St John)", "Wonderful" (MA)	Music Adviser	Songs of Praise, BBC1
Dec 7	2014	London	"Wonderful"	Music Adviser	Songs of Praise, BBC1
July 13	2014	London	"Swing Low, Sweet Chariot"	Music Adviser	Songs of Praise, BBC1
Nov 30	2014	London	"Go Tell It" (MA Joshua Kesler)	Music Adviser	Songs of Praise, BBC1
Sep 28	2014	London	Gospel Choir Of The Year (MA)	Music Adviser	Songs of Praise, BBC1
April 19	2015	London	"Beautiful One"	Music Adviser	Songs of Praise, BBC1
April 5	2015	London	"To God Be The Glory"	Music Adviser	Songs of Praise, BBC1
Aug 02	2015	London	"How Great Is Our God"	Music Adviser	Songs of Praise, BBC1
Aug 09	2015	London	Shout To The Lord	Music Adviser	Songs of Praise, BBC1
Aug 16	2015	London	"He Is Exalted" (MA)	Music Adviser	Songs of Praise, BBC1
Aug 30	2015	London	Choir Of The Year (Music Advisor)	Music Adviser	Songs of Praise, BBC1
Feb 15	2015	London	"The Reason Why I Sing"	Music Adviser	Songs of Praise, BBC1
Feb 22	2015	London	"He Is Exalted" (MA)	Music Adviser	Songs of Praise, BBC1
Feb 8	2015	London	"Joyful Joyful"	Music Adviser	Songs of Praise, BBC1
Jan 18	2015	London	"Sing Unto The Lord"	Music Adviser	Songs of Praise, BBC1
JAN 4	2015	London	"Here I Am To Worship"	Music Adviser	Songs of Praise, BBC1
June 7	2015	London	"Lord I Lift Your Name"	Music Adviser	Songs of Praise, BBC1
June 21	2015	London	"We Want To See Jesus Lifted High"	Music Adviser	Songs of Praise, BBC1
March 15	2015	London	Open The Eyes Of My Heart	Music Adviser	Songs of Praise, BBC1
May 24	2015	London	"Praise Is Rising"	Music Adviser	Songs of Praise, BBC1
Nov 15	2015	London	"10,000 Reasons"	Music Adviser	Songs of Praise, BBC1
Oct 18	2015	London	What A Friend	Music Adviser	Songs of Praise, BBC1
Oct 26	2015	London	"Amazing Grace"	Music Adviser	Songs of Praise, BBC1
Oct 4	2015	London	"Beautiful One"	Music Adviser	Songs of Praise, BBC1
Oct 5	2015	London	Gospel Choir Of The Year (MA)	Music Adviser	Songs of Praise, BBC1
Sep 06	2015	London	Choir Of The Year	Music Adviser	Songs of Praise, BBC1
Feb 07	2016	London	"He Is Exalted" (MA - Ruach)	Music Adviser	Songs of Praise, BBC1
Feb 1	2016	London	"Beyond The Norm", Gospel Choir launch	Music Adviser	Songs of Praise, BBC1
Feb 21	2016	London	"Here I Am To Worship"	Music Adviser	Songs of Praise, BBC1
Feb 28	2016	London	Beautiful One	Music Adviser	Songs of Praise, BBC1
Jul 3	2016	London	"Show Me Love", performed by Laura Mvula	Music Adviser	Songs of Praise, BBC1
Jun 19	2016	London	"Going Up Yonder"	Music Adviser	Songs of Praise, BBC1
March 13	2016	London	"Sing Unto The Lord"	Music Adviser	Songs of Praise, BBC1
Nov 1	2016	London	Gospel Choir: Music Adviser	Music Adviser	Songs of Praise, BBC1
Oct 30	2016	London	Gospel Choir: Music Adviser	Music Adviser	Songs of Praise, BBC1
May 28	2017	London	"It Is Well"	Music Adviser	Songs of Praise, BBC1
Dec 22	2013	London	The Big Sing	Performer	Songs of Praise, BBC1
Oct 27	2013	London	The Big Sing	Performer	Songs of Praise, BBC1
Sep 20	2013	London	Big Sing	Performer	Songs of Praise, BBC1
Jul 7	2015	London	Big Sing	Performer	Songs of Praise, BBC1
July 12	2015	London	Big Sing	Performer	Songs of Praise, BBC1
Dec 25	2016	London	Christmas Big Sing	Performer	Songs of Praise, BBC1
Jul 10	2016	London	Big Sing	Performer	Songs of Praise, BBC1
Oct 1	2016	London	The Big Sing	Performer	Songs of Praise, BBC1
July 2	2017	Stanage Edge	"You Raise Me Up"	Performer with JB Gill	Songs of Praise, BBC1
Sep 1	2013	Blackburn	"Salvations Is Free" (Tessera & Carleen)	Performer, with Tessera	Songs of Praise, BBC1
JAN 5	2014	Blackburn	"I Surrender All" (with Carleen Anderson)	Performer, with Tessera	Songs of Praise, BBC1
Apr 30	2017	London	"Precious Lord"	Performer, with Tessera	Songs of Praise, BBC1
April 3	2016	Sheffield	Choir Of The Year: Seniors	TV Judge	Songs of Praise, BBC1
April 10	2016	Sheffield	Choir Of The Year: Juniors	TV Judge	Songs of Praise, BBC1
April 24	2016	Sheffield	Choir Of The Year: Finals	TV Judge	Songs of Praise, BBC1
Dec 4	2016	Manchester	"Mary Did You Know"	Performer, with Tessera	Songs of Praise, BBC1
Jun 05	2016	London	"In Moments Like This"	Arranger, conductor	Songs of Praise, BBC1
Jun 05	2016	London	"This Train"	Arranger	Songs of Praise, BBC1
Jun 19	2016	London	"Beautiful One"	Conductor	Songs of Praise, BBC1
Nov 17	2019	Gospel Choir Of The Year		Overall Musical Director & Producer	Songs of Praise, BBC1
Nov 24	2019	Gospel Choir Of The Year		Overall Musical Director & Producer	Songs of Praise, BBC1
Dec 1	2019	Advent		Conductor	Songs of Praise, BBC1
Dec 8	2019	Edwardian Christmas		Performer (with Rick Astley)	Songs of Praise, BBC1
Dec 15	2019	The Nativity		Conductor	Songs of Praise, BBC1
Dec 22	2019	The Big Sing Christmas		Conductor	Songs of Praise, BBC1
Dec 29	2019	The Big Sing Belfast		Conductor	Songs of Praise, BBC1
Jan 5	2020	New Year Promises		Conductor	Songs of Praise, BBC1
					Songs of Praise, BBC1
Jan 19	2020	Kinross		Conductor	Songs of Praise, BBC1
Jan 26	2020	Holocaust Memorial		Conductor	Songs of Praise, BBC1
Feb 2	2020	Reading		Conductor	Songs of Praise, BBC1
Feb 9	2020	Autism		Conductor	Songs of Praise, BBC1
Feb 16	2020	Sacred Inspiration		Conductor	Songs of Praise, BBC1
Feb 23	2020	Preparing For Lent		Conductor	Songs of Praise, BBC1
					Songs of Praise, BBC1
Mar 8	2020	International Women’s Day		Conductor	Songs of Praise, BBC1
Mar 15	2020	County Down		Conductor	Songs of Praise, BBC1
Mar 22	2020	Mothering Sunday		Conductor	Songs of Praise, BBC1
Mar 29	2020	Aled Jones & Songs Of Praise		Conductor	Songs of Praise, BBC1
Apr 5	2020	Palm Sunday Glasgow		Conductor	Songs of Praise, BBC1
Apr 12	2020	Easter Sunday		Conductor	Songs of Praise, BBC1
Apr 19	2020	Strawberry Field		Conductor	Songs of Praise, BBC1
Apr 26	2020	Christian Pilgrimage		Conductor	Songs of Praise, BBC1
