= Oxhey Woods =

Nature reserve in Hertfordshire, England

Coordinates: 51.616°N 0.4014°W

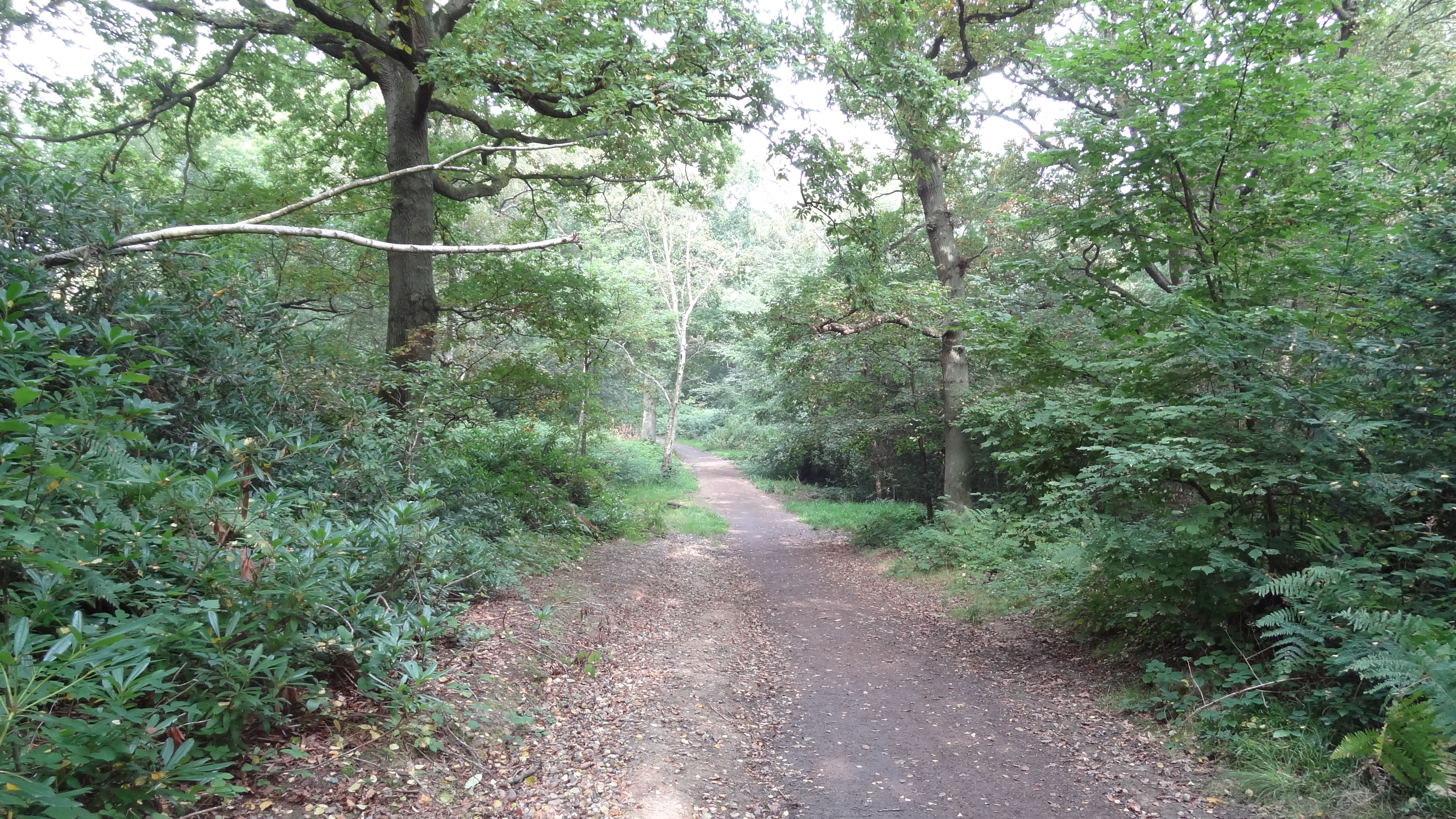

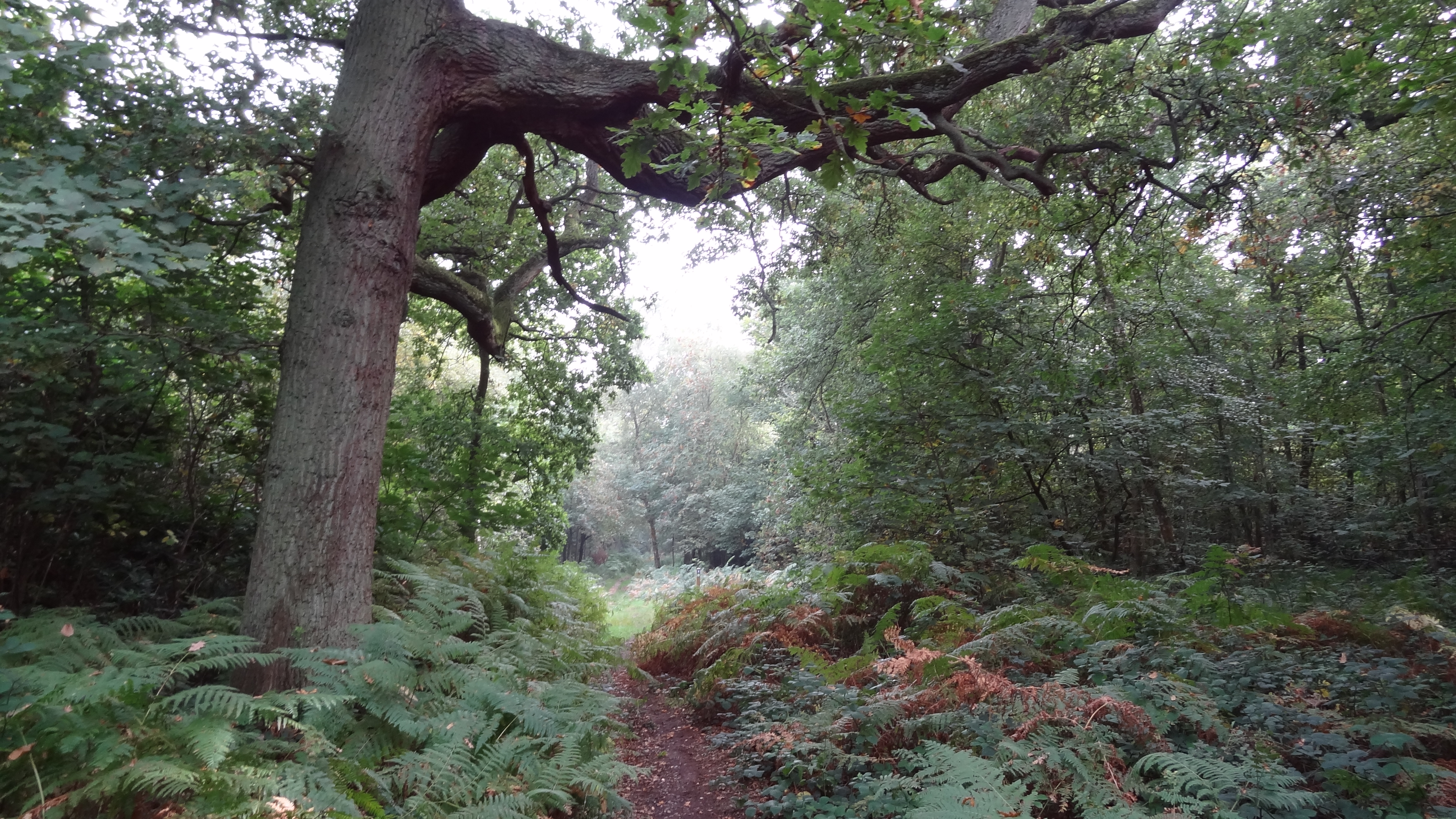

Oxhey Woods is a 98 hectare Local Nature Reserve in South Oxhey in Hertfordshire, England. It is owned and managed by Three Rivers District Council.

It is mainly semi-natural woodland, and some areas date back to the last Ice Age, the Younger Dryas, 11,500 years ago. The range of habitats makes it an important ecological site. Plants include bluebells, anemones and violets and the rare wild service tree.

== Facilities and access ==
The woods have parking facilities, picnic benches and a trail. There is access from Nairn Green, Oxhey Drive and Prestwick Road.
