= Andrew King (neurophysiologist) =

British neurophysiologist & professor (born 1959)

Andrew King FRS FMedSci
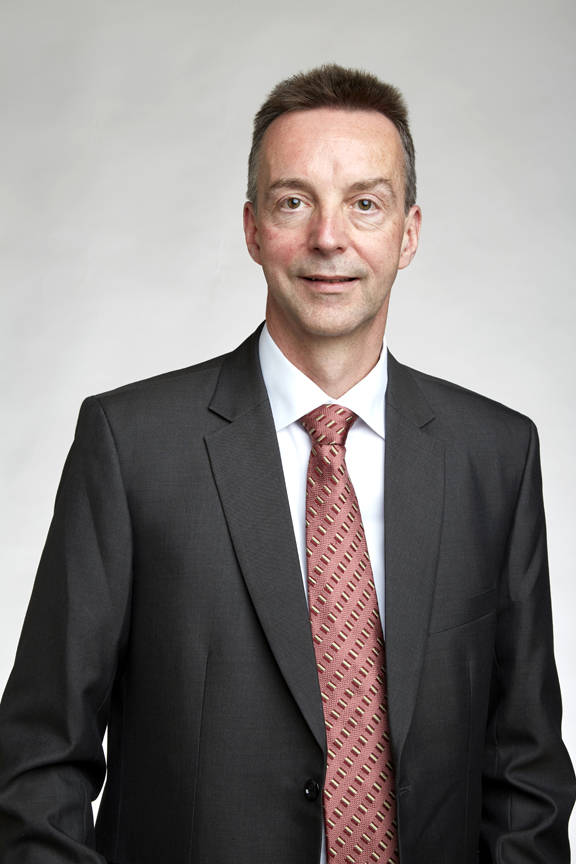
- King in 2018
- Born: Andrew John King; 8 April 1959 (age 67); Greenford, Middlesex
- Education: Northolt High School
- Alma mater: King's College London; University of London
- Awards: Wellcome Prize Medal in Physiology
- Scientific career
- Fields: Neurophysiology
- Workplaces: University of Oxford; National Institute for Medical Research
- Thesis: The representation of visual and auditory space in the guinea-pig superior colliculus (1984)
- Website: www.neuroscience.ox.ac.uk/research-directory/andrew-king

Andrew John King (born 8 April 1959) is a British neurophysiologist who is a Professor of Neurophysiology and Wellcome Trust Principal Research Fellow in the Department of Physiology, Anatomy and Genetics at the University of Oxford and a Fellow of Merton College, Oxford.

== Education ==
King was educated at Northolt High School and graduated from King's College London with a Bachelor of Science degree and was a PhD student at the National Institute for Medical Research where his doctoral research investigated the representation of visual and auditory space in the superior colliculus of guinea pigs. His was awarded a PhD in 1984 by the University of London.

== Career and research ==
King discovered that the mammalian brain contains a spatial map of the auditory world and showed that its development is shaped by sensory experience. His work has also demonstrated that the adult brain represents sound features in a remarkably flexible way, continually adjusting to variations in the statistical distribution of sounds associated with different acoustic environments as well to longer term changes in input resulting from hearing loss. In addition to furthering our understanding of the neural basis for auditory perception, his research is helping to inform better treatment strategies for the hearing impaired.

=== Awards and honours ===
King was elected a Fellow of the Royal Society in 2018 for "substantial contributions to the improvement of natural knowledge". He was elected a Fellow of the Academy of Medical Sciences in 2011 and is also a Fellow of The Physiological Society.
