= Eddie Chaloner =

Eddie Chaloner, is a Consultant Vascular Surgeon practicing in the UK.

Chaloner qualified in Medicine from Oxford University in 1989. During his surgical training, he served in the British Army with 144 Parachute Squadron RAMC and 23 Parachute Field Ambulance. He was deployed on active service to Rwanda (1994), Bosnia (1997) and Kosovo (1999) with the Airborne Brigade and retired in 2001 with the rank of Major. He also frequently worked overseas for Medecins Sans Frontieres and the HALO Trust in Afghanistan, Mozambique, Angola, Sri Lanka and Iraq. He published widely on the clinical and social effects of anti-personnel landmines and conducted basic research into the physiology of blast protection, much of which was published in the open literature.

Chaloner was appointed consultant vascular surgeon at University College Hospitals London in 2002. He currently holds an NHS post as a consultant vascular surgeon at Lewisham and Greenwich NHS Trust and runs a private practice Radiance Health, which operates from several hospitals run by BMI Healthcare.

Chaloner pioneered endovenous laser surgery treatment for varicose veins in the UK, which has revolutionised the treatment of this common condition worldwide. In 2003 he was the first surgeon in London and the South of England to use laser surgery to treat veins, four years after endovenous surgery had been introduced into the UK by Mark Whiteley.

He frequently lectures and teaches on the subject of minimally invasive vein surgery and is a faculty member on a variety of training programmes including for the Royal College of Surgeons of England, the Charing Cross International Vascular Symposium and the Venous Forum of the Royal Society of Medicine. He is also a member of the Vascular Society and of the Royal Society of Medicine.

In 2010, Chaloner became the first surgeon in the UK to use the Clarivein treatment for varicose veins to achieve sealing of saphenous vein reflux by an injection free technique. He continues to research in this field.

Chaloner took part in the British TV programme The Choir: Sing While You Work on BBC Two in 2012.

As a member of The Lewisham and Greenwich NHS Choir, he also sang in “A Bridge Over You”, a charity single released in December 2013 to raise funds for Macmillan Cancer Support and other local healthcare charities.
