= The Choir (TV series) =

British television series

- Genre: Documentary; Reality television
- Directed by: Dollan Cannell (Unsung Town); Sing while you work S2; Peter Coventry (Episode 1); Stuart Froude (Episode 2); Tim Hancock (Episode 3)
- Presented by: Gareth Malone
- Country of origin: United Kingdom
- Original language: English
- No. of series: 6
- No. of episodes: 28 + 10 Specials

Production
- Executive producers: Jamie Isaacs; Lucy Hillman (Military Wives, Unsung Town Revisited)
- Producers: Pete Cooksley (Sing while you work); Ludo Graham; Rachel Morgan (Sing while you work Series 2); Dollan Cannell (Unsung Town Revisited); Stephen Finnigan (Military Wives)
- Running time: 60 min
- Production companies: Twenty Twenty; BBC

Original release
- Network: BBC Two
- Release: 4 December 2006 – 5 December 2016

Related
- The Naked Choir; The Choir: Revisited

The Choir is a BAFTA award-winning TV series following Gareth Malone as he tackles the task of teaching choral singing to people who have never had the chance, or experience to sing before.

The first series aired on 4 December 2006, the third series, The Choir: Unsung Town, which involved the creation of a choir in South Oxhey, Hertfordshire began on BBC Two on 1 September 2009, whilst the fourth series, The Choir: Military Wives was aired in November 2011. The series began to air on BBC America in the summer of 2010.

== Transmissions ==
Title	Episodes	Start date	End date
The Choir	3	4 December 2006	18 December 2006
The Choir: Boys Don't Sing	4	1 February 2008	22 February 2008
The Choir: Unsung Town	4	1 September 2009	22 September 2009
The Choir: Military Wives	3	7 November 2011	21 November 2011
The Choir: Sing While You Work	6	20 September 2012	25 October 2012
The Choir: Sing While You Work; Series 2	8	4 November 2013	23 December 2013
Specials
The Choir: Revisited	1	25 January 2008	
The Choir: Boys Don't Sing Revisited	1	29 September 2009	
The Choir does Sports Relief	1	19 March 2010	
The Choir does Comic Relief	1	18 March 2011	
The Choir does Children in Need		18 November 2011	
The Choir: Unsung Town Revisited	1	28 November 2011	
The Choir: Military Wives Compilation	1	22 December 2011	
A Year with the Military Wives	1	25 December 2012	
Gareth's All-Star Choir	2	3 November 2014	10 November 2014
The Choir: New Military Wives	2	16 December 2014	23 December 2014
Gareth Malone's Great Choir Reunion	2	26 December 2015	28 December 2015

== The Choir ==
The original series of The Choir, aired in three episodes in 2006, followed Gareth Malone's attempts to start a choir from scratch in Northolt High School, a comprehensive school in Middlesex that has never previously had a school choir. In the programme he auditions 160 pupils for his 30-strong choir. After only nine months' training, take them to China to compete in the 2006 World Choir Games. This observational documentary series focuses on the emotional journey of the choir members as they overcome their initial reluctance and try to meet Malone's challenge of performing competitively.

=== The Choir: Revisited ===
This one-off documentary was filmed as a follow-up to the first series of The Choir and features a return visit to the pupils of Northolt as Malone finds out how the young singers' live have changed in the two years since the first programme.

== The Choir: Boys Don't Sing ==
In the second series, originally aired in 2008, Malone takes his choral mission to the Lancaster School, an all-boys school in Leicester which, like the school in the first series, has no previous singing tradition. The single-sex education setting focuses the programme on issues of gender as Malone tackles the perception that "boys don’t sing".

Malone joins the teaching staff and has to work to gain the trust of fellow teachers. His ambition is to form a 100-strong, all-boys choir performing out on the stage alongside the best school choirs in the country as part of the Schools Prom concert at the Royal Albert Hall. As he tries to drive through his ambitious plans, he also has to spend time in classroom teaching, deal with the daily bureaucracy of being a teacher, and coping with staff politics.

=== The Choir: Boys Don't Sing – Revisited ===
This is a one-off documentary follow-up to the second series, in which Gareth Malone returns to the Lancaster School to catch up with the former choir members and find out if he has made a lasting impact on their lives.

== The Choir: Unsung Town ==
The third series of The Choir, broadcast in September 2009, focuses on a town rather than an education setting. Gareth Malone takes his choral challenge to the community of South Oxhey, Watford, a housing estate area where working class culture is strong and there is no tradition of choral singing. Malone's challenge is to break through preconceptions about choirs and motivate local people to sing together, and he succeeds in creating a community choir and staging a choral festival at South Oxhey playing fields.

The legacy of the programme was the creation of the South Oxhey Community Choir and the South Oxhey Youth Choir. During the filming of The Choir, the choirs performed at venues including the Watford Colosseum in December 2008, St Albans Abbey in February 2009, and headlining at Sox Fest '09 in May 2009. In April 2009, the Community Choir made their debut recording at Abbey Road Studios

Gareth Malone continued as choirmaster for two years following the conclusion of the TV recording and now maintains his support as patron. The choir continues to perform regularly with their current musical director, Simon Wookey.

=== The Choir: Unsung Town – Revisited ===
This is a one-off documentary follow-up to the third series, in which Gareth Malone returns to South Oxhey to catch up with the choir members both past and present; in order to see if the community is continuing to be united through the use of song.

== The Choir does Sport Relief ==
Aired on 19 March 2010 as part of Sport Relief 2010; Gareth Malone gathered and trained Olympic and Paralympic athletes to form The Sport Relief Choir.

== The Choir does Comic Relief ==
Gareth Malone took part in the BBC's charity fundraising show Comic Relief 2011, which was aired on 18 March 2011. He formed a choir of celebrity chefs (including Ainsley Harriott, Antony Worrall Thompson, Nancy Lam, Rosemary Shrager, Gary Rhodes, Rusty Lee and others) and trained them to sing a choral arrangement of Rick Astley's 1987 song "Never Gonna Give You Up". During rehearsals, Astley appeared in person. The song was performed live on television as part of the fundraiser show.

== The Choir: Military Wives ==
The fourth series, The Choir: Military Wives, began airing on Monday, 7 November 2011 and followed the three-episode format of the previous series. The situation is different from previous series; the setting is on two military bases in Devon (Chivenor Barracks and Royal Citadel, Plymouth), and Malone seeks to enlist voices for an all-women choir - the wives and girlfriends of military personnel deployed to Afghanistan. The programme explores the vulnerability of the women while their partners are away on active service, and Malone's aim is to strengthen their morale and raise their profile in the public perception. The culmination of the programme is a performance by the Military Wives Choir in The Royal British Legion's Remembrance service at the Royal Albert Hall on 12 November 2011.

As a spin-off of the Military Wives series, the Military Wives Choir recorded a CD single of the song Wherever You Are specially composed for the programme by Paul Mealor. The song became the Christmas number-one single.

The DVD of the series was released in June 2012 by Acorn Media UK.

== The Choir does Children in Need ==
Aired on 18 November 2011 as part of Children in Need 2011.

Over 2000 children performed via video link-up from across the UK for the Children in Need 2011 appeal night singing Avril Lavigne's "Keep Holding On".

== The Choir: Sing while you work ==
=== Series 1 ===
In the 2012 series, Gareth Malone takes his choral mission into places of work, travelling to Lewisham NHS Trust, the Bristol branch of Royal Mail, Manchester Airport and the offices of Severn Trent Water. He sets up a choir of employees in each organisation who then rehearse music with the aim of competing in a singing competition in front of a judging panel consisting of the music director of the John Lewis Partnership, Manvinder Rattan; soul singer Ruby Turner; and choral conductor Ralph Allwood. The winning group is to be judged the best workplace choir. Manchester airport choir were eliminated at the semi-final stage. Of the three remaining groups, Severn Trent Water choir won the final.

Episode	Workplace	Airdate
1	Lewisham NHS Trust	20 September 2012
2	Royal Mail Bristol	27 September 2012
3	Manchester Airport	4 October 2012
4	Severn Trent Water	11 October 2012
5	SEMI-FINAL	18 October 2012
6	FINAL	25 October 2012

=== Series 2 ===
For the second series of Sing While You Work, staff choirs from five organisations are created.

Episode	Workplace	Airdate
1	P&O	4 November 2013
2	Birmingham City Council	11 November 2013
3	Sainsbury's	18 November 2013
4	Cheshire Fire and Rescue Service	25 November 2013
5	Citigroup	2 December 2013
6	QUARTER FINAL	9 December 2013
7	SEMI FINAL	16 December 2013
8	FINAL	22 December 2013

== Gareth's All-Star Choir ==
Gareth forms an All-Star choir, bringing together a group of celebrities from television, sport and theatre with the aim to record and release the official 2014 Children in Need single Wake Me Up (Originally by Avicii). The choir consists of 12 celebrities; Mel Giedroyc, Alison Steadman, Alice Levine, Jo Brand, Linda Robson, Maggie Alphonsi, Craig Revel Horwood, John Craven, Larry Lamb, Fabrice Muamba, Nitin Ganatra and Radzi Chinyanganya.

== Ratings ==
Episode no.	Airdate	Total viewers	Weekly ranking BBC Two
The Choir
1	4 December 2006	2,280,000	19
2	11 December 2006	2,690,000	11
3	18 December 2006	2,980,000	6
The Choir: Revisited
1	25 January 2008	1,820,000	27
The Choir: Boys Don't Sing
1	1 February 2008	2,530,000	17
2	8 February 2008	2,724,000	8
3	15 February 2008	2,743,000	7
4	22 February 2008	3,163,000	6
The Choir: Unsung Town
1	1 September 2009	2,652,000	7
2	8 September 2009	2,667,000	4
3	15 September 2009	2,417,000	9
4	22 September 2009	2,787,000	5
The Choir: Boys Don't Sing Revisited
1	29 September 2009	2,681,000	9
The Choir does Sports Relief
—N/a	19 March 2010	—N/a	—N/a
The Choir does Comic Relief
—N/a	18 March 2011	—N/a	—N/a
The Choir: Military Wives
1	7 November 2011	2,520,000	13
2	14 November 2011	2,744,000	6
3	21 November 2011	2,978,000	6
The Choir does Children in Need
—N/a	18 November 2011	—N/a	—N/a
The Choir: Sing while you work
1	20 September 2012	2,543,000	4
2	27 September 2012	3,074,000	2
3	4 October 2012	2,607,000	3
4	11 October 2012	2,836,000	3
5	18 October 2012	3,098,000	2
6 (Final)	25 October 2012	3,246,000	2
The Choir: Sing while you work Series 2
1	4 November 2013	2,900,000	6
2	11 November 2013	2,840,000	8
3	18 November 2013	2,580,000	7
4	25 November 2013	2,510,000	8
5	2 December 2013	2,310,000	7
6	9 December 2013	2,200,000	8
7	16 December 2013	2,650,000	4
8 (Final)	22 December 2013	3,450,000	1
The Choir: New Military Wives
1	16 December 2014	2,600,000	8
2	23 December 2014	2,200,000	10
Gareth Malone's Great Choir Reunion
1	26 December 2015	2,360,000	9
2	28 December 2015	1,990,000	13
The Choir: Gareth's Best in Britain
1	1 November 2016	2,290,000	6
2	8 November 2016	2,500,000	7
3	15 November 2016	2,210,000	9
4	22 November 2016	2,080,000	7
5	29 November 2016	2,180,000	7
6	5 December 2016	2,300,000	7

== DVD releases ==
Title	Details	Special features	Release dates
The Choir – Series One	4 episodes; 16:9 Aspect Ratio; Subtitles: yes; English (2.0 stereo); Total running time: approx 240 minutes	The Choir: Revisited	Region 2 – 5 September 2009
The Choir Series 2: Boys Don't Sing	4 episodes; Total running time: approx 300 minutes		18 April 2011
The Choir Series 3: Unsung Town	Total running time: 240 minutes		5 September 2011
The Choir Series 4: Military Wives	Total running time: 180 minutes	Gareth Malone biography; photo gallery	6 February 2012

== Awards and nominations ==
The Choir was awarded a BAFTA at the British Academy Television Awards 2007 for Best Feature. The Choir: Boys Don't Sing won several awards in 2009, including a BAFTA at the British Academy Television Awards 2009 for Best Feature of 2008, the 2009 Broadcast Award of Best Popular Factual Programme, the Royal Television Society 2009 for best Constructed Factual Series, and Best Programme Series in the 2009 VLV Awards The Choir: Unsung Town was the winner of the Best Factual Programme of 2009 category at the 2010 Broadcasting Press Guild Awards, and was nominated for a BAFTA as best Television Feature of 2009 for the British Academy Television Awards 2010.

== United States version ==
The USA Network planned to air It Takes a Choir starting in October 2014. Episodes had been taped two years earlier. The premiere date was delayed several times, and late in November 2014, the network announced that it would air all eight episodes on the afternoon and evening of 29 December.

== See also ==
- The Naked Choir
