= Royal Mail Choir =

Bristol Royal Mail Choir

Background information
- Origin: South West England, United Kingdom
- Genres: Classical, popular music
- Instrument: Choral
- Years active: 2012-present
- Members: Penny Barr; Jacky Bretherton; Mandy Butler; Ruth Davies; Chris Finch; Pete Flook; Sam Fry; Heather Gage; Kevin Harrington; Sarah Iles; Carol Jennings; Vinnie Jones; John Kavanagh; Brian Macey; Pat McIntyre; Jill Maggs; Naomi Parr; Julian Pinkett; Heather Poole; Jo-Anne Poole; Jane Prendergrast; Kay Stevenson; Mo Summers; Bill Waine; Liz Wembridge; Chris Wilson

The Bristol Royal Mail Choir is an amateur choral ensemble made up of employees of Royal Mail. The choir was founded in April 2012 by choirmaster Gareth Malone as part of the BBC Two television series The Choir: Sing While You Work. At the time of founding, the choir was made up of employees drawn from Bristol and its surrounding area of South West England. The choir is conducted by David Ogden.

The Royal Mail also has a London-based choir, the Mail Voice Choir.

== The Choir: Sing While You Work ==
The 2012 BBC 2 TV series followed Gareth Malone as he formed and trained four workplace choirs, including one from the Bristol Royal Mail workforce. Bristol Royal Mail Choir was one of three that reached the final of the competition, where they sang at the Wales National Eisteddfod in Llangollen.

== Charity work ==
Following the success of the ensemble's television appearances, the Royal Mail Choir, now performing as the Royal Mail's official choir, has given public performances to aid charity, particularly in support of Prostate Cancer UK, the Royal Mail's partner charity for 2013. In April 2013 the choir released a version of "Abide with Me" with The X Factor winner Joe McElderry, to promote a set of footballer-themed stamps. Proceeds were donated to Prostate Cancer UK. They have performed at St George's Church, Bristol.

In September 2013, they performed a charity concert at Bridgewater Hall, Manchester, at the invitation of Manchester Airport Choir. The choir also performed at the PostEurop 20th anniversary celebration held in Brussels, Belgium. In November 2013 they performed at the Poppy Appeal Commemorative Festival held at Colston Hall, Bristol.

== Advertising campaigns ==
As a public face of the Royal Mail, the choir were used to launch the Christmas commemorative stamp issue in October 2012.

The choir's rendition of the Beatles song "All You Need is Love" was used to accompany the Royal Mail's post-privatisation national television advertising campaign beginning in November 2013. The advertisement, called "We Love Parcels", is the first major advertising campaign by the Royal Mail for 6 years. The choir recorded the song at the Abbey Road Studios, London.

== Musical directors ==
- David Ogden
- Paul Woolley
