= Leeds Youth Opera =

British opera company

Leeds Youth Opera is an opera company whose performers are aged 12 to 25, based in Leeds, West Yorkshire, England. The Yorkshire Post described the group as a "national cultural treasure".

== Background ==
Formed in 1971, Leeds Youth Opera (LYO) caters for singers aged 12–25. Since its creation, the company has gained a reputation for performing rare works, as well as the standard operatic repertoire. LYO generally performs two productions each year, as part of the Leeds Civic Arts Guild, which is based at the Carriageworks theatre in central Leeds.

== Noted productions ==
The UK premieres of Satyagraha and The Voyage by Philip Glass were performed by LYO. In July 2008 the group performed the world staged premiere of Oliver Rudland's The Nightingale and the Rose. In July 2009 they performed the European Premier of Appomattox by Glass.

The company's 2006 production of Sondheim's Sweeney Todd was described by the BBC as "excellently performed".

== Selection of past performances ==
- Feb 2020 - Don Giovanni (Wolfgang Amadeus Mozart) (Amanda Holden English Translation)
- July 2019 - Die Fledermaus
- Feb 2019 - Macbeth (opera) (Giuseppe Verdi)
- July 2018 - In Our Element (Devised piece by LYO with selections of pieces from operas and musicals)
- Feb 2018 - La Bohème (Giacomo Puccini)
- July 2017 - A Masked Ball
- Feb 2017 - Les Misérables (musical)
- July 2016 - West Side Story (Leonard Bernstein Lyrics by Stephen Sondheim)
- Feb 2016 - The Marriage of Figaro (Wolfgang Amadeus Mozart)
- July 2015 - The Elixir of Love (Donizetti)
- Feb 2015 - Sweeney Todd (Sondheim)
- July 2014 - The Magic Flute (Mozart)
- Feb 2014 - Hansel and Gretel (Humperdinck)
- July 2013 - Carmen (Bizet)
- Feb 2013 - Candide (Bernstein)
- July 2012 - Manon (Massenet)
- Feb 2012 - The Poisoned Kiss (Vaughan Williams)
- July 2011 - Eugene Onegin (Pyotr Ilyich Tchaikovsky) performed in English.
- Feb 2011 – La Traviata (Verdi)
- July 2010 - Faust (Gounod)
- Feb 2010 - Orpheus in the Underworld (Offenbach)
- July 2009 – Appomattox
- Feb 2009 – I Lombardi (Verdi)
- July 2008 – The Nightingale and the Rose (Oliver Rudland) and Carmina Burana (Orff)
- Feb 2008 – Idomeneo (Mozart)
- July 2007 – Der Freischütz (Weber)
- Feb 2007 – The Love for Three Oranges (Prokofiev)
- July 2006 – Sweeney Todd (Sondheim)
- Feb 2006 – Cinderella (Massenet)
- July 2005 – The Magic Flute (Mozart)
- Feb 2005 – The Tales of Hoffmann (Offenbach)
- July 2004 – The Voyage (Glass)
- Feb 2004 – The Pearl Fishers (Bizet)
- July 2003 – Turandot (Puccini)
- Feb 2003 – Merrily We Roll Along (Sondheim)
- July 2002 – A Masked Ball (Verdi)
- Feb 2002 – Candide (Bernstein)
- July 2001 – Peter Grimes (Britten)
- Feb 2001 – A Little Night Music (Sondheim)
- July 2000 – Carmen (Bizet)
