= Islip Manor High School =

Secondary school in London, England

Location
- Eastcote Lane; Northolt, Middlesex, Greater London, UB5 4HP; England; 51°33′09″N 0°22′35″W

Information
- Type: Foundation school
- Established: 1641
- Local authority: Ealing
- Department for Education URN: 101943 Tables
- Ofsted: Reports
- Head teacher: Marion Budd
- Gender: Mixed-sex education
- Age: 11 to 18
- Enrolment: 1396
- Former name: Eliots Green Grammar School and Vincent Secondary Modern
- Website: http://www.northolthigh.org.uk

Islip Manor High School is a secondary school located in the Northolt area of the London Borough of Ealing, England.

== Admissions ==
The school accepts students between the age of 11 to 18. The school has a total of 1401 students.

It is situated on the northern edge of the borough of Ealing, near to the intersection of the boroughs of Ealing, Harrow and Hillingdon. It is north-west of Northolt town centre.

== History ==
=== Grammar school and Secondary Modern ===
Northolt High School was established in 1974 as a combination of Vincent Secondary Modern (est. 1953) and Eliots Green Grammar school (Est 1956) which were adjacent to each other on Eastcote Lane in Northolt.

=== Comprehensive school ===
It became a comprehensive in 1974.

The school was featured in a documentary series called The Choir, on the BBC during December, 2006. The choir director, Gareth Malone, was at the school from November 2005 to July 2006, before taking the choir to China, to compete in the World Choir Games.

=== Change of name ===
The school changed its name to Islip Manor High School starting with the 2025-2026 academic year.

== Buildings ==
In November 2005 the school began constructing a £1.5 million Sports Hall that was completed in November 2006 and opened in January 2007. The Sports Hall is a community facility offering a range of sport and leisure activities. It is managed through a partnership between Northolt High School and Active Ealing. The school also has a CLC and an astroturf pitch and a renovated Sixth Form Centre, opened in 2007.

== Information ==
Northolt High School is based on Eastcote Lane.

- The nearest railway station Northolt tube station
- The 282 and 395 buses stop outside of the school, and the 120, 140 and 90 buses stop at Northolt tube station, a five-minute walk from the school. The E10 bus stops at Islip Manor Park
- , also a few minutes walk from the school; it is situated close to Notholt Underground Station.

== Notable former pupils ==
Eliots Green Grammar School

- Andrew King FRS, neurophysiologist
- Steve Perryman, football player
- General Sir John Reith CBE, former Deputy Supreme Allied Commander Europe

Northolt High School

- Entertainment/media/creative:
  - Kerry Godliman - comedian and actor
  - Adam Hamdy - novelist, screenwriter and producer
  - Katie Hillier - fashion designer
  - Rahul Kohli - actor
  - Andy Miller - guitarist, Dodgy
- Sports:
  - Kieron Forbes, football player
  - Oliver Hawkins, football player
  - Danny Hutchins, football player
  - Jerome Okimo, football player
  - Karleigh Osborne, football player
