= Gareth Malone =

English choirmaster (born 1975)

Gareth Malone OBE
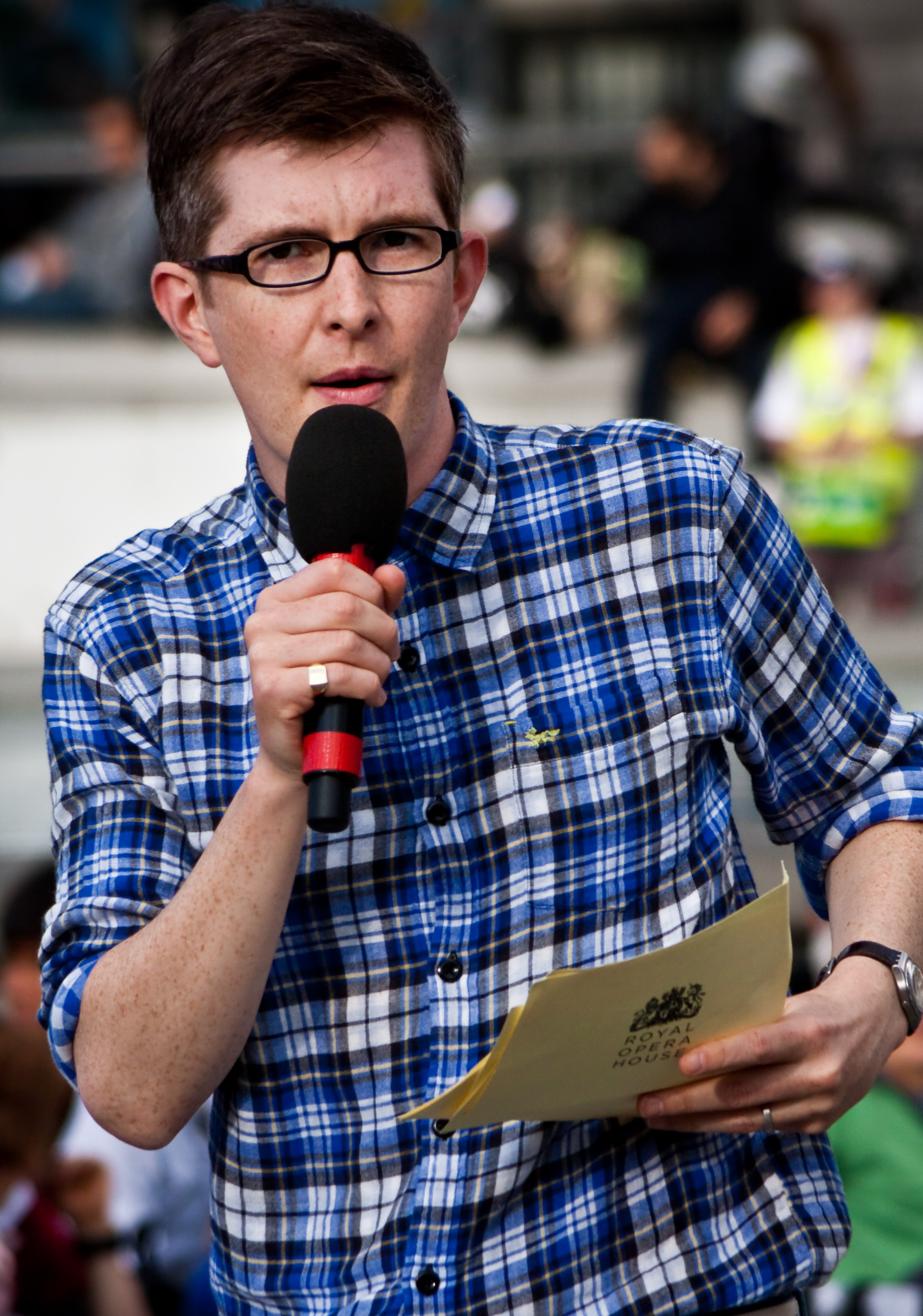
- Malone rehearsing at Trafalgar Square in June 2010
- Born: Gareth Edmund Malone; 9 November 1975 (age 50); London, England
- Education: University of East Anglia; Royal Academy of Music
- Occupations: Choirmaster; television presenter
- Known for: The Choir, The Big Performance
- Spouse: Becky Malone
- Children: 3
- Awards: 2007: BAFTA Television Award – Best Feature (The Choir) 2009: BAFTA Television Award – Best Feature (The Choir: Boys Don't Sing); 2009: Broadcast Award – Best Popular Factual Programme Winner (The Choir: Boys Don't Sing); 2010: 36th BPG Television and Radio Awards – Best TV Performer in a Non-acting Role & best Factual Entertainment show (The Choir) 2010: Freedom of the City of London
- Website: www.garethmalone.com

Gareth Edmund Malone OBE (born 9 November 1975) is an English choirmaster and broadcaster, self-described as an "animateur, presenter and populariser of choral singing". He is best known for his television appearances in programmes such as The Choir, which focus on singing and introducing choral music to new participants. Malone was appointed Officer of the Order of the British Empire (OBE) in the 2012 Birthday Honours, for services to music.

== Biography ==
Gareth Malone was born into a family of Irish descent as the only child of James and Sian Malone, who had met at their local Gilbert and Sullivan society. His father, James Malone, grew up in Parkhead in Scotland in an Irish family, and was a bank manager. His English mother of Irish descent, Sian, worked in the civil service. Gareth was educated at Bournemouth School. He sang with the Symphony Chorus of the Bournemouth Symphony Orchestra (BSO) and he studied drama at the University of East Anglia, Norwich, where he was in the university choir and composed music for theatre productions. After graduating he gave private tuition and then applied for a postgraduate vocal studies course at the Royal Academy of Music; he passed with distinction in 2005.

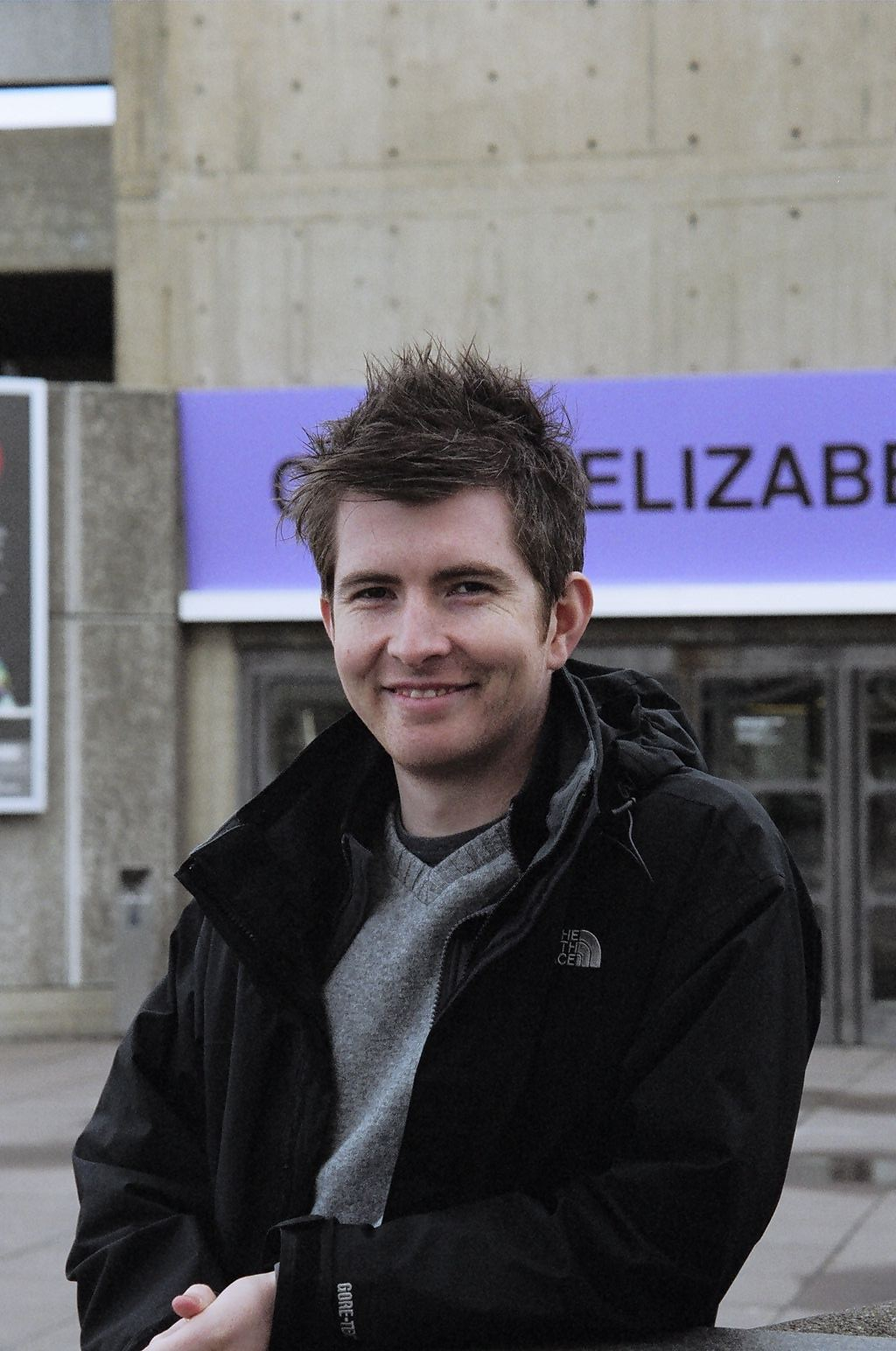
Gareth Malone in 2008

Until December 2009, Malone worked for the London Symphony Orchestra at LSO St Luke's where he ran their youth choir and community choir. Whilst working at the L.S.O., Malone was awarded the position of Edward Heath Assistant Animateur in 2001. He entered television work when approached by 20/20, a production company which wanted to make a series about singing in schools. Without knowing who could front the programme they had researched the term "community choirmasters" and discovered Malone's name. The Choir was the result and won two BAFTAs and a Broadcast award.

On 31 December 2009, Malone conducted the first New Year's Eve Twitter Community Choir performance of Auld Lang Syne. He asked his followers on Twitter, and friends on Facebook, to join in with the event.

A later project was The Knight Crew, a youth opera based on a book written by Nicky Singer and performed at Glyndebourne. After choosing approximately 50 cast out of over 400 applicants between the ages of 14 and 20 through workshops and auditions, and months of rehearsals, The Knight Crew was performed at Glyndebourne between 3 and 6 March 2010. The project was filmed for a television series, Gareth Malone Goes to Glyndebourne and aired on the BBC on 1 July 2010.

In May 2010, Malone was awarded the Freedom of the City of London by Nick Anstee, Lord Mayor of the City of London (not to be confused with the Mayor of London) in recognition of his music education work in that city.

In 2013, Malone recruited 16 singers aged from 18 to 27 for his Gareth Malone Voices choir. They recorded a CD album and gave concerts at 14 locations throughout Britain in 2014.

In October 2023, Malone became the patron of the Canterbury Choral Society.

== Television work ==
Gareth Malone's television appearances began in 2007 with his reality television series The Choir, broadcast on BBC Two. The series focused on teaching choral singing to teenagers with no such experience, the first programme being set in Northolt High School, a comprehensive school in the west London suburbs. Subsequent programmes continued the theme by taking choral music to challenging situations: Boys Don't Sing (2008) featured pupils at Lancaster School, Leicester, an all-boys school where there was reluctance to sing; the third series, entitled Unsung Town, featured the formation of a community choir in South Oxhey, a suburban town where singing was not a common activity.

In 2010 Malone presented a children's programme for CBBC, The Big Performance in which ten keen, but extremely shy, young singers took the opportunity to overcome their fears. They sang for a larger audience each week, taking it in turns to be the soloist, and in the final week they performed for BBC Proms in the Park. A second series was broadcast in 2011 with the final week taking the form of a performance of a choral arrangement of the song "Keep Holding On" for the BBC charity telethon Children in Need 2011. The ten singers led a live choir in the studio along with children's choirs nationwide, linked by satellite.

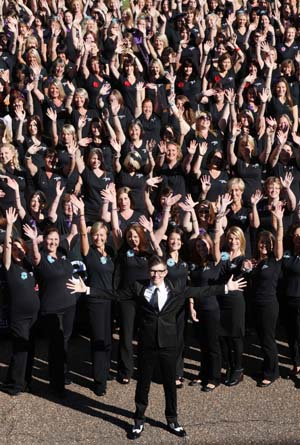
Military Wives Choir Foundation Launch with Gareth Malone Sept 2012

For the BBC Two programme The Choir: Military Wives, first broadcast in November 2011, Malone went to Chivenor Barracks in Devon and 29Cdo in Plymouth creating two choirs from wives and partners of military personnel deployed to Afghanistan. The culmination of the programme was the opening performance for the Royal British Legion's Festival of Remembrance at the Royal Albert Hall on 12 November 2011 where the Plymouthand Chivenor choirs performed as one. The three-minute piece performed by the Military Wives Choir was the song Wherever You Are, a love poem compiled from letters written between the women and their absent husbands and partners and set to music by composer Paul Mealor.

A successful campaign was launched to promote sales of the CD single, with the aim of it becoming the 2011 Christmas number one in the UK Singles Chart, which was supported by BBC Radio 2 DJ Chris Evans. First day sales, which included all pre-orders, indicated that they were outselling their closest rivals, Little Mix, by a hundred singles to one, causing Ladbrokes to close betting for the Christmas number one, and Simon Cowell to admit defeat in the race. The pre-order sales caused the single to become one of the top 20 best-selling music products of all-time at Amazon.co.uk.

In 2011, Malone's show Gareth Malone Goes to Glyndebourne won an International Emmy Award in the Best Arts Programme category.

On 16 November 2014, it was announced that Malone and a group of celebrities he had mentored had reached the UK number 1 with their Children in Need charity single "Wake Me Up", a cover of the song originally recorded by Swedish dance act Avicii.

On 10 September 2015, Malone appeared on the BBC One programme Who Do You Think You Are?

In 2017, Malone presented Pitch Battle on BBC One, which The Guardian described as a "new Saturday teatime singing contest". The review continued: "His Pitch Battle entrance – following the sort of VT explainer that Celebrity Big Brother contestants tend to receive – was excruciating. As the crowd roared, he opened his jacket and showed off his shirt, like a professional wrestler would if he was doing double duty as an usher at his cousin’s wedding." The show was axed after one series, although Malone defended the series in a Radio Times interview, saying: "I thought it was good".

In March 2020, Malone announced an initiative titled the Great British Home Chorus, a new home choir for people internationally whilst everyone was stuck at home during the COVID-19 pandemic. He also revealed he had been in talks with the BBC about making another television programme. In the first week over 100,000 people viewed the first session on YouTube. In July 2020, as a finale to the Great British Home Chorus, Malone orchestrated a choral version of You Are My Sunshine with over 11,000 singers taking part, accompanied by the London Symphony Orchestra. The song was released as a single, with all the profits being donated to NHS Charities Together.

In August 2022, Malone appeared on Celebrity Masterchef. He was eliminated in the quarterfinals of the competition.

In September 2022, Malone appeared in series 2 of The Masked Dancer as Cactus, and was eliminated in week 4.

== Personal life ==
Malone is married to Becky, an English teacher. They live in North London with their three children. Their elder daughter, Esther, was born in 2010. Their son, Gilbert, was born in 2013. They also have a younger daughter, Dvora, who was born in 2019.

== Bibliography ==
Gareth Malone has written two books on the subject of choral singing. His most recent title, Choir: Gareth Malone, is an account of the production of his television series The Choir.

- Malone, Gareth (28 April 2011). Music for the People: A Journey through the Pleasures and Pitfalls of Classical Music. Collins. ISBN 978-0-00-738305-4.
- Malone, Gareth (13 September 2012). Choir: Gareth Malone. Harper Collins. ISBN 978-0007488001.

== Television filmography ==
Malone's television appearances include to date:

Date	Title	Broadcaster	Notes
2007	The Choir	BBC Two	
2008	The Choir: Boys Don't Sing	BBC Two	
2009	The Choir: Unsung Town	BBC Two	Broadcast by NHK Educational TV and NHK BS1 (NHK衛星第1テレビジョン, NHK Ēsē Dai-ichi Terebijon) (NHK Broadcasting Satellite Television 1) in Japan in 2010
2009	How a Choir Works	BBC Four	Single documentary
2009	Never Mind the Buzzcocks	BBC Two	Appeared as a guest on panel game show
2010	Sport Relief 2010	BBC One	Appeared as a guest conducting the Olympic Choir
2010	Shanties and Sea Songs with Gareth Malone	BBC Four	Single documentary as part of BBC Sea Fever season
2010	Gareth Malone Goes to Glyndebourne	BBC Two	Example
2010	Extraordinary School for Boys	BBC Two	Example
2010	The Big Performance	CBBC	Series aimed at children
2011	The Choir Does Comic Relief 2011	BBC One	Guest appearance on BBC Red Nose Day 2011 training a choir of celebrity chefs
2011	The Big Performance	CBBC	Series aimed at children
2011	Children in Need	BBC One	Guest appearance leading a choir of children
2011	The Choir: Military Wives	BBC Two	Spin-off single "Wherever You Are" released on 18 December 2011
2012	Sing While You Work	BBC Two	Four workplace choirs are formed and compete over six episodes
2012	Never Mind the Buzzcocks	BBC Two	Appeared as a guest on panel game show
2013	It Takes A Choir	USA	US version of The Choir
2013	Sing While You Work	BBC Two	Five workplace choirs are formed and compete over eight episodes
2013	Mr. Blue Sky (Jeff Lynne)	BBC Four	Choirs for a "The XX century Mozart, Jeff Lynne"
2014	Would I Lie To You?	BBC One	Appeared as a guest on the panel game show
2014	Gareth's All Star Choir	BBC One	A choir of celebrities create a recording of Avicii's Wake Me Up for Children in Need
2014	The Choir: New Military Wives	BBC Two	New military wives choir for the World War One Prom
2015	Who Do You Think You Are?	BBC One	
2015	The Naked Choir with Gareth Malone	BBC Two	A cappella groups compete in a competition
2015	Gareth Malone's Big Choir Reunion	BBC Two	
2016	Gareth's Invictus Choir	BBC Two	In association with the Invictus Games
2016	The Choir: Gareth's Best in Britain	BBC Two	
2017	Pitch Battle	BBC One	Judge
2019	Britain's Christmas Story	BBC One	Co-presenter (with Karen Gibson)
2020	The Choir: Singing for Britain	BBC Two	
2022	The Great Celebrity Bake Off for SU2C	Channel 4	Series 5; Episode 2
2022	Celebrity Masterchef	BBC One	Series 17; Episodes 4-6
2022	The Masked Dancer	ITV	
2023	Sing for the King: The Search for the Coronation Choir	BBC One	With Amanda Holden, Motsi Mabuse & Rose Ayling-Ellis
2024	Gareth Malone's Easter Passion	BBC One	Three-part series
2025	Gareth Malone's Messiah	BBC One	Three-part series

== Discography ==
=== Albums ===
Title	Year	Peak chart positions	
Title	Year	UK	UK Classical
Voices	Released: November 2013; Label: Decca; Formats: CD, digital download	23	17
A Great British Christmas	Released: December 2016; Label: Decca; Formats: CD, digital download	45	2
Music for Healing	Released: November 2019; Label: Decca; Formats: CD, digital download	75	3

=== Singles ===
Title	Year	Peak chart positions	Sales
Title	Year	UK	Sales
"Wherever You Are" (with Military Wives)	2011	1	UK: 631,000
"Wake Me Up" (with All Star Choir)	2014	1	UK: 126,000
"Flesh and Blood" (with the Invictus Games choir)	2016	29	
