= List of songs written by Gary Barlow =

Gary Barlow OBE (born 20 January 1971 in Frodsham, Cheshire) is an English singer-songwriter, pianist and record producer. He is the lead vocalist and songwriter of the pop group Take That, and is one of the UK's most successful songwriters, having written 13 number 1 singles in the UK to date including "Back for Good" which went to number 1 in 31 countries across the world.

Barlow has had 20 top 5 singles (14 of which went to number one), 9 number-one albums with Take That and 3 solo albums selling over 130 million records worldwide and over 7 million concert tickets.

Barlow has also written songs for films such as Stardust, Kingsman: The Secret Service, Eddie the Eagle, Argylle and Christmas Karma.

Below is a list of some songs written by Barlow, including collaborations with other songwriters and songs written for the screen and stage.

Song title	Additional writers	Artist	Album / Project	Notes
"2 of a Kind"	Eliot Kennedy, Tim Woodcock	Monrose	Temptation	
"5 O'Clock"	Howard Donald, Jason Orange, Mark Owen, Greg Kurstin, T-Pain, Lily Allen, Cameron Thomaz, Steve Robson	T-Pain feat. Wiz Khalifa & Lily Allen	RevolveЯ	
"6 in the Morning Fool"	Billy Mann, Howard Donald, Jason Orange, Mark Owen	Take That	Beautiful World (bonus track)	
"6th Avenue"	John Shanks	Gary Barlow	Since I Saw You Last	
"84"	Howard Donald, Jason Orange, Mark Owen	Take That	None	B-side
"A Different Stage"	Tim Firth	Gary Barlow	A Different Stage	Written for Barlow's one-man show
"Adventures of a Lonely Balloon"	Howard Donald, Jason Orange, Mark Owen	Take That	None	Opening music on The Circus Live
"Actress"	James Maddock	Gary Barlow	Since I Saw You Last	
"Actress"	James Maddock	Clinic	Unknown	
"Affirmation"	Howard Donald, Jason Orange, Mark Owen, Robbie Williams	Take That	Progress	
"A Gift Is Still A Gift"	Gurinder Chadha, Hilmi Jaidin	Pixie Lott and Leo Suter	Christmas Karma	
"Ain't No Sense in Love"	Billy Mann, Howard Donald, Jason Orange, Mark Owen	Take That	Beautiful World	
"The Alchemist"	Eliot Kennedy	Russell Watson		
"Aliens"	Howard Donald, Jason Orange, Mark Owen, Robbie Williams	Take That	Progressed	
"All for Nothing"	Matt Cardle, Eg White	Matt Cardle	Letters	
"All I Want Is You"	None	Take That	Forever... Greatest Hits	
"All That I've Given Away"	None	Gary Barlow	Twelve Months, Eleven Days	
"All That Matters to Me"	None	Take That	Forever... Greatest Hits	
"All Wrapped Up"	Howard Donald, Mark Owen, Ben Mark, Jamie Norton	Take That	This Life (Deluxe)	
"Always"	None	Gary Barlow	Open Road	
"Always Be My Baby"	Eliot Kennedy, Tim Woodcock, Liz McClarnon	Atomic Kitten	Ladies Night	
"A Matter of Love"	Tim Rice	Jeff Chang (Taiwan)		Music by Barlow, lyrics by Rice
"Amazing"	Howard Donald, Mark Owen, John Shanks	Take That	III	
"And The Band Plays"	Howard Donald, Mark Owen	Take That	Wonderland	
"Another Crack in My Heart"	None	Take That	Everything Changes	
"Apache 2006"	Howard Donald, Jason Orange, Mark Owen	Take That	Unknown	
"Are You Ready Now"	None	Gary Barlow	Open Road	
"Arms Around Me"	Peter Vettese	Gary Barlow	Twelve Months, Eleven Days	
"Ascension"	Holly Johnson	Holly Johnson	Fly (Songs Inspired by the Film Eddie the Eagle)	
"Babe"	None	Take That	Everything Changes	
"Back for Good"	None	Take That	Nobody Else	
"Bad Libran"	Tim Firth	Gary Barlow	Music Played by Humans	
"Beautiful"	Howard Donald, Jason Orange, Mark Owen, Robbie Williams	Take That	Progressed	
"Beautiful Morning"	Ben Mark, John Shanks, Howard Donald, Jason Orange, Mark Owen	Take That	Beautiful World (bonus track)	
"Beautiful World"	Steve Robson, Howard Donald, Jason Orange, Mark Owen	Take That	Beautiful World	
"Before We Get Too Old"	Tim Firth	Gary Barlow	Music Played by Humans	
"Before You Turn Away"	None	Gary Barlow	Twelve Months, Eleven Days	
"Believe"	Howard Donald, Mark Owen, Ben Mark, Jamie Norton	Take That	III	
"Best of Me"	Eliot Kennedy, Gary Baker, James Bourne	Various	Britannia High Soundtrack	
"Bird In Your Hand"	Howard Donald, Mark Owen, Ben Mark, Jamie Norton, Michael C. Corson	Take That	III (2015 Edition)	
"Boy Inside the Man"	David Goldsmith	Pixie Lott and Leo Suter	Christmas Karma	
"Brand New Sun"	Howard Donald, Mark Owen	Take That	This Life	
"Breeze On By"	Donny Osmond, Bobby Womack, Eliot Kennedy	Donny Osmond	What I Mean to Say	
"Broken Your Heart"	None	Take That	Everything Changes	
"Butterfly"	John Shanks, Eliot Kennedy, Tim Woodcock	Delta Goodrem	Innocent Eyes	
Butterfly	John Shanks, Howard Donald, Jason Orange, Mark Owen	Take That	Beautiful World (bonus track)	
"Candy"	Robbie Williams	Robbie Williams	Take the Crown	
"Carry Me Home"	Howard Donald, Mark Owen, Ben Mark, Mark Taylor, Paul Barry	Take That	III (2015 Edition)	
"The Champion"	Howard Donald, Mark Owen, Jamie Norton, Ben Mark	Take That	This Life	
"Christmas is Everywhere"	None	Gary Barlow		
"Christmas Time"	Donny Osmond, Eliot Kennedy	Donny Osmond	What I Mean to Say	
"Conquered"	Eliot Kennedy, Rick Allison	Lara Fabian	A Wonderful Life	
"The Colder It Feels"	None	Gary Barlow	The Dream of Christmas	
"Come on Christmas"	None	Gary Barlow	The Dream of Christmas	
"Come on Love"	Howard Donald, Mark Owen	Take That	Wonderland	
"The Circus"	Howard Donald, Jason Orange, Mark Owen	Take That	The Circus	
"Cry"	Howard Donald, Mark Owen, Sigma	Take That, Sigma	Wonderland	
"The Day After Tomorrow"	None	Take That	Nobody Else	
"The Day The Work Is Done"	Howard Donald, Jason Orange, Mark Owen, Robbie Williams	Take That	Progressed	
"Days I Hate Myself"	Howard Donald, Mark Owen	Take That	This Life	
"Determination"	Eliot Kennedy, Peter Cox, Richard Drummie	Go West	Fly (Songs Inspired by the Film Eddie the Eagle)	
"Different"	Robbie Williams	Robbie Williams	Take the Crown	
"Do It All for Love"	Howard Donald, Mark Owen, John Shanks	Take That	III	
"Do It All Over Again"	Eliot Kennedy, Ina Wroldsen	Various	Britannia High Soundtrack	
"Do What U Like"	Ray Hedges	Take That	Take That and Party	
"Don't Give Up on Me"	Howard Donald, Mark Owen	Take That	Wonderland	
"Don't Look Down"	Becky Hill	Gary Barlow	Meanwhile EP	
"Don't Need a Reason"	None	Gary Barlow	Twelve Months, Eleven Days	
"Don't Say Goodbye"	Howard Donald, Jason Orange, Mark Owen, Robbie Williams	Take That	Progressed	
"Don't Take Your Love"	None	Take That	Forever... Greatest Hits	
"The Dream of Christmas"	None	Gary Barlow	The Dream of Christmas	
"Dying Inside"	None	Gary Barlow	Since I Saw You Last	
"Easy Way Out"	Charlotte Church, Eliot Kennedy	Charlotte Church	Tissues and Issues	
"Eight Letters"	Howard Donald, Jason Orange, Mark Owen, Robbie Williams	Take That	Progress	
"Electric Energy"	George Alan O'Dowd, Lorne Balfe, Matthew Vaughn, Stuart Price	Ariana DeBose, Boy George, Nile Rodgers	Argylle	
"Eleven"	None	Gary Barlow	Music Played by Humans	
"Elita"	Jean Rodriguez, Michael Bublé, Sebastian Yatra	Gary Barlow	Music Played by Humans	
"Enough is Enough"	None	Gary Barlow	Music Played by Humans	
"Everlasting"	Howard Donald, Mark Owen	Take That	Odyssey	
"Every Guy"	None	Take That	Nobody Else	
"Every Revolution"	Howard Donald, Mark Owen, Ben Mark, Jamie Norton	Take That	Wonderland	
"Everything Changes"	Eliot Kennedy, Mike Ward, Cary Baylis	Take That	Everything Changes	
"Everything I Ever Wanted"	None	Gary Barlow	Open Road	
"Face to Face"	John Shanks	Gary Barlow	Since I Saw You Last	
"Fast Car"	None	Gary Barlow	Twelve Months, Eleven Days	
"Feel Like I Feel"	None	Marcus Collins	Marcus Collins	
"Flaws"	Howard Donald, Mark Owen	Take That	III	
"The Flood"	Howard Donald, Jason Orange, Mark Owen, Robbie Williams	Take That	Progress	
"Flowerbed"	Howard Donald, Jason Orange, Mark Owen, Robbie Williams	Take That	Progress	
"Fly"	Eliot Kennedy	Andy Bell	Fly (Songs Inspired by the Film Eddie the Eagle)	
"For All That You Want"	Max Martin, Kristian Lundin	Gary Barlow	Twelve Months, Eleven Days	
"Forever Love"	None	Gary Barlow	Open Road	
"Freeze"	Howard Donald, Mark Owen	Take That	III	
"The Garden"	Howard Donald, Jason Orange, Mark Owen	Take That	The Circus	
"Get Ready For It"	Howard Donald, Mark Owen, Steve Robson	Take That	III	
"Geraldine's Melody"	Peter Kay			ASCAP lists the performer as Take That
"Giants"	Howard Donald, Mark Owen, Ben Mark, Jamie Norton, Wil Malone	Take That	Wonderland	
"Girl I'll Never Understand"	Tim Woodcock	Blue	All Rise	
"Give Good Feeling"	None	Take That	Take That & Party	
"Give You My Love"	Howard Donald, Mark Own	Take That	III	
"God"	None	Gary Barlow	Since I Saw You Last	
"Greatest Day"	Howard Donald, Jason Orange, Mark Owen	Take That	The Circus	
"Guess Who Tasted Love"	None	Take That	Take That and Party (bonus track)	
"Guilty"	Eliot Kennedy, Tim Woodcock, Duncan James	Blue	Guilty	
"Hanging onto Your Love"	David Morales	Take That	Nobody Else (UK bonus track)	
"Happy Now"	Howard Donald, Jason Orange, Mark Owen, Robbie Williams	Take That	Progress	
"Hate It"	None	Take That	Nobody Else (UK bonus track)	
"Heart and I"	Robbie Williams	Robbie Williams	The Definitive Collector's Edition	
"Hello"	Steve Robson, Howard Donald, Jason Orange, Mark Owen	Take That	The Circus	
"Here"	Olly Knights, Gail Paridjanian, Howard Donald, Jason Orange, Mark Owen	Take That	The Circus	
"Hey Boy"	Howard Donald, Mark Owen, Ben Mark, Jamie Norton	Take That	III (2015 Edition)	
"Higher Than Higher"	Howard Donald, Mark Owen, Joe Janiak, Mattias Larsson, Robin Fredriksson	Take That	III	
"Hold On"	John Shanks, Howard Donald, Jason Orange, Mark Owen	Take That	Beautiful World	
"Hold Up a Light"	Ben Mark, Jamie Norton, Howard Donald, Jason Orange, Mark Owen	Take That	The Circus	
"Holding Back the Tears"	None	Take That	Nobody Else	
"Hope"	Howard Donald, Mark Owen, Tom Baxter	Take That	Wonderland	
"How Can It Be"	None	Take That	Take That and Party (bonus track)	
"How Christmas Is Supposed to Be"	None	Gary Barlow	The Dream of Christmas	
"How Did It Come To This?"	Ben Mark, Jamie Norton, Howard Donald, Jason Orange, Mark Owen	Take That	The Circus	
"I Can Make It"	None	Take That	Take That and Party	
"I Didn't See That Coming"	None	Gary Barlow	Music Played by Humans	
"I Like It"	Howard Donald, Mark Owen, John Shanks	Take That	III	
"I Should've Followed You Home"	Jörgen Elofsson	Agnetha Fältskog	A	
"I Won't Be There"	Natasha Hamilton, Eliot Kennedy, Tim Woodcock	Atomic Kitten	Ladies Night	
"I'd Wait for Life"	Howard Donald, Jason Orange, Mark Owen	Take That	Beautiful World	
"If There's Not A Song About It"	Colbie Caillat, Gavin DeGraw	Gary Barlow	Meanwhile EP	
"If You Want It"	Howard Donald, Mark Owen, Greg Kurstin	Take That	III	
"If You Weren't Leaving Me"	Mark Owen, Eliot Kennedy, Tim Woodcock	Mark Owen	In Your Own Time	
"Incredible"	None	Gary Barlow	Music Played by Humans	
"Incredible" – Acoustic	None	Gary Barlow	Music Played by Humans	
"Incredible Christmas"	None	Gary Barlow	Single	
"Incredible" – F9 Charleston Remix	James Wiltshire	Gary Barlow	Music Played by Humans	
"In It for Love"	Donny Osmond, Eliot Kennedy, Delaire Peterson, Paul Peterson, Richard Peterson	Donny Osmond	What I Mean to Say	
"In the Morning Fool"	Billy Mann, Howard Donald, Jason Orange, Mark Owen	Take That		
"Insecurity"	Donny Osmond, Wayne Hector, Eliot Kennedy	Donny Osmond	What I Mean to Say	
"Into the Wild"	Howard Donald, Mark Owen, Gary Go, John Martin	Take That	III	
"Intoxicated"	Lara Fabian	Lara Fabian	A Wonderful Life	
"It's All for You"	Howard Donald, Mark Owen	Take That	Wonderland	
"It's Christmas Time Again"	Tim Firth	Gary Barlow		
"It's Gonna Be a Long Night"	Andrew Tierney, Michael Tierney	Human Nature	Human Nature	
"It's Only Life"	Tim Rice	Elaine Paige	Elaine Paige and Friends	
"Julie"	Steve Robson, Howard Donald, Jason Orange, Mark Owen	Take That	The Circus	
"Jump"	Tim Rice-Oxley	Gary Barlow	Since I Saw You Last	
"Keep Her in Mind"	Donny Osmond, Eliot Kennedy, Tim Woodcock	Donny Osmond	What I Mean to Say	
"Keep Your Head Up"	Howard Donald, Mark Owen	Take That	This Life	
"Kidz"	Howard Donald, Jason Orange, Mark Owen, Robbie Williams	Take That	Progress	
"King Without a Crown"	None			
"Lady Tonight"	None	Take That	Nobody Else (UK bonus track)	
"Lay Down for Love"	Richard Stannard, Matt Rowbottom	Gary Barlow	Open Road	
"Let in the Sun"	Howard Donald, Mark Owen, Edvard Erfjord, Gary Go, Henrik Barman Michelsen	Take That	III	
"Let It Rain"	Howard Donald, Jason Orange, Mark Owen	Take That		
"Let's Get Drunk"	Charlie Deakin Davies, Ryan Carline	Gary Barlow	Music Played by Humans	
"Lie to Me"	None	Gary Barlow	Twelve Months, Eleven Days	
"Living Inside My Heart"	Martin Fry	ABC	Fly (Songs Inspired by the Film Eddie the Eagle)	
"Let Me Go"	None	Gary Barlow	Since I Saw You Last	
"Lighthouse"	John Shanks	Westlife	Greatest Hits	
"Like I Never Loved You at All"	John Shanks, Howard Donald, Jason Orange, Mark Owen	Take That	Beautiful World	
"A Little Too Late"	Eliot Kennedy, Delta Goodrem	Delta Goodrem	Mistaken Identity	
"Longer"	Delta Goodrem, Eliot Kennedy, Tim Woodcock	Delta Goodrem	Innocent Eyes	
"Love Ain't Here Anymore"	None	Take That	Everything Changes	
"Lovelife"	Howard Donald, Mark Owen, Ben Mark, Jamie Norton	Take That	III	
"Love Love"	Howard Donald, Jason Orange, Mark Owen, Robbie Williams	Take That	Progressed	
"Lucky Stars"	Howard Donald, Mark Owen, Noel Svahn	Take That	Wonderland	
"Luv Luv Luv"	None	Gary Barlow	B Side	
"Man"	Howard Donald, Jason Orange, Mark Owen, Robbie Williams	Take That	Progressed	
"Mancunian Way"	Eg White, Howard Donald, Jason Orange, Mark Owen	Take That	Beautiful World	
"March of the Hopeful"	Howard Donald, Mark Owen, Ben Mark, Jamie Norton	Take That	This Life	
"A Million Love Songs"	None	Take That	Take That and Party	
"Meaning of Love"	None	Take That	Everything Changes	
"Mind Full of Madness"	Howard Donald, Mark Owen	Take That	This Life	
"Missing Person"	Eliot Kennedy, Gary Baker	Various	Britannia High Soundtrack	
"Moment"	None	Tony Hadley	Fly (Songs Inspired by the Film Eddie the Eagle)	
"Money Talks"	Gurinder Chadha, Hilmi Jaidin	Gary Barlow	Christmas Karma	
"More Than Life"	None	Gary Barlow	Since I Saw You Last	
"Mr Everything"	None	Gary Barlow	Since I Saw You Last	
"My Big Mistake"	Delta Goodrem, Eliot Kennedy, Tim Woodcock	Delta Goodrem	Innocent Eyes	
"My Commitment"	Diane Warren	Gary Barlow	Open Road	
"My Perfect Rhyme"	Donny Osmond, Eliot Kennedy	Donny Osmond	What I Mean to Say	
"Never Forget"	None	Take That	Nobody Else	
"Never Knew"	None	Gary Barlow	Open Road	
"Never Want to Let You Go"	None	Take That	Take That and Party	
"New Day"	Howard Donald, Mark Owen	Take That	Wonderland	
"No Big Deal"	Tim Woodcock, Eliot Kennedy, Lara Fabian, Rick Allison	Lara Fabian	A Wonderful Life	
"No Good in Goodbye"	Alex Cantrell, Damon Sharpe, Eliot Kennedy	Mercury4	Mercury4	
"No One Knows"	Richard Rawson, Tulisa Contostavlos, Dappy	N-Dubz	Against All Odds	
"No Si Aqui No Hay Amor"	None	Take That	Forever... Greatest Hits	
"Nobody Else"	None	Take That	Nobody Else	
"Not Me, Not I"	Kara DioGuardi, Delta Goodrem, Eliot Kennedy, Jarrad Rogers	Delta Goodrem	Innocent Eyes	
"Nothing Feels the Same"	None	Gary Barlow	Twelve Months, Eleven Days	
"Oh What a Day"	None	Gary Barlow	Music Played by Humans	
"Once Upon a Christmas Song"	Peter Kay	Geraldine McQueen	None	ASCAP lists the performer as Take That.
"Once You've Tasted Love"	None	Take That	Take That and Party	
"One More Word"	Howard Donald, Mark Owen, Ben Mark, Jamie Norton	Take That	This Life	
"Open Road"	None	Gary Barlow	Open Road	
"Out Here Looking"	Matilda Mann	Gary Barlow	Meanwhile EP	
"Out of Our Heads"	Howard Donald, Mark Owen	Take That	Odyssey	
"Out of the Sky"	Ben Mark, Mark Owen	Marc Almond	Fly (Songs Inspired by the Film Eddie the Eagle)	
"Paddington Bear"	None	Gary Barlow	Paddington Bear (From "The Adventure of Paddington")	
"Pain of the Past"	Gurinder Chadha, Hilmi Jaidin	Boy George	Christmas Karma	
"Patience"	John Shanks, Howard Donald, Jason Orange, Mark Owen	Take That	Beautiful World	
"People Like You"	Eliot Kennedy	Paul Young	Fly (Songs Inspired by the Film Eddie the Eagle)	
"Portrait"	Howard Donald, Mark Owen	Take That	III	
"Pray"	None	Take That	Everything Changes	
"Pretty Things"	Howard Donald, Jason Orange, Mark Owen, Robbie Williams	Take That	Progress	
"Promises"	Graham Stack	Take That	Take That and Party	
"Rain Song"	Howard Donald, Jason Orange, Mark Owen	Take That		
"Reach Out"	John Shanks, Howard Donald, Jason Orange, Mark Owen	Take That	Beautiful World	
"Requiem"	Robbie Williams	Gary Barlow	Since I Saw You Last	
"River"	Howard Donald, Mark Owen, Ben Mark, Jamie Norton	Take That	Wonderland	
"Rocket Ship"	Robbie Williams, Howard Donald, Jason Orange, Mark Owen	Take That	None	B-side
"Rule the World"	Howard Donald, Jason Orange, Mark Owen	Take That	Beautiful World (bonus track)	
"Run for Your Life"	None	Matt Cardle	Letters	
"Running Away"	Delta Goodrem, Eliot Kennedy, Tim Woodcock	Delta Goodrem	Innocent Eyes	
"Running Wild"	Jacob Attwooll, Josh Record, Ryan Carline	Jin	Happy	
"Said It All"	Steve Robson, Howard Donald, Jason Orange, Mark Owen	Take That	The Circus	
"Satisfied"	None	Take That	Take That and Party	
"Serenity"	Howard Donald, Mark Owen	Take That	This Life (Deluxe)	
"Shame"	Robbie Williams	Robbie Williams	In and Out of Consciousness: Greatest Hits 1990–2010	
"She Said"	Ben Mark, Jamie Norton, Howard Donald, Jason Orange, Mark Owen	Take That	The Circus	
"Shi Zong"	Eliot Kennedy, Tim Woodcock, Chen Zhen Chuan	Gigi Leung	Love Songs For Myself	
"Shine"	Steve Robson, Howard Donald, Jason Orange, Mark Owen	Take That	Beautiful World	
"Shoulda' Known Better"	Donny Osmond, Eliot Kennedy	Donny Osmond	What I Mean to Say	
"Shout in Silence"	Andy Hill	Katherine Jenkins	Rejoice	
"Since I Saw You Last"	None	Gary Barlow	Since I Saw You Last	
"Sing"	Andrew Lloyd Webber	Various Artists	Sing	Written as the official song of Queen Elizabeth II's Diamond Jubilee
"Sleepwalking"	Howard Donald, Jason Orange, Mark Owen	Take That	The Circus (Japanese edition bonus track)	
"Small Town Girls"	None	Gary Barlow	Since I Saw You Last	
"Somebody"	Natasha Hamilton, Eliot Kennedy, Tim Woodcock	Atomic Kitten	Access All Areas: Remixed and B-Sides	
"SOS"	Howard Donald, Jason Orange, Mark Owen, Robbie Williams	Take That	Progress	
"Spin"	Howard Donald, Mark Owen, Ben Mark, Jamie Norton	Take That	Odyssey	
"Start of Something"	Eliot Kennedy Andy Hill	Various	Britannia High Soundtrack	
"Stay Together"	John Shanks, Howard Donald, Jason Orange, Mark Owen	Take That	None	B-side
"Still Can't Get over You"	None	Take That	Forever... Greatest Hits	
"Stronger"	Graham Gouldman	Gary Barlow	Twelve Months, Eleven Days	
"Stronger Than I Am"	None	Ronan Parke	Ronan Parke	
"Sunday to Saturday"	Howard Donald, Mark Owen	Take That	Forever... Greatest Hits	
"Superhero"	Kristian Lundin, Max Martin, Jolyon Skinner	Gary Barlow	Open Road (US release only)	
"Supernatural"	None	Gary Barlow	Music Played by Humans	
"Supersexual"	Eliot Kennedy, Duncan James, Lee Ryan, Simon Webbe, Anthony Costa, Tim Woodcock	Blue	One Love	
"Superstar"	Howard Donald, Mark Owen	Take That	Wonderland	
"Sure"	Robbie Williams, Mark Owen	Take That	Nobody Else	
"Sweet July"	Howard Donald, Mark Owen, Bill Maybury, Mike Needle, Matt Rad, Noah Conrad	Take That	TT10	
"Taste It"	Duncan James, Eliot Kennedy, Tim Woodcock	Blue	Guilty	
"Take That and Party"	Ray Hedges	Take That	Take That and Party	
"Testify"	Amy Studt, Eliot Kennedy, Tim Woodcock	Amy Studt	False Smiles	
"The Official BBC Children in Need Medley"	Various	Peter Kay	None	Samples and features Barlow's Never Forget
"The Big Bass Drum"	None	Gary Barlow	Music Played by Humans	
"The Day The World Stop Turning"	None	Gary Barlow	Music Played by Humans	
"The Kind of Friend I Need"	Tim Firth	Gary Barlow	Music Played by Humans	
"The Last Poet"	Howard Donald, Mark Owen	Take That	Wonderland	
"The Man I Am"	Howard Donald, Mark Owen, Ben Mark, Jamie Norton	Take That	This Life (Deluxe)	
"The Song I'll Never Write"	Andrew Frampton, Steve Kipner	Gary Barlow	Since I Saw You Last	
"These Days"	Howard Donald, Mark Owen, Ben Mark, Jamie Norton	Take That	III	
"This House"	John Shanks	Gary Barlow	Since I Saw You Last	
"This Is My Time"	None	Gary Barlow	Music Played by Humans	
"This Life"	Howard Donald, Mark Owen, Shawn Lee, Andy Platts	Take That	This Life	
"This Time"	None	Dame Shirley Bassey	The Performance	
"Thrill Me"	Andy McCluskey	Orchestral Manoeuvres in the Dark	Fly (Songs Inspired by the Film Eddie the Eagle)	
"Throw It Away"	Cathy Dennis, Eliot Kennedy	Delta Goodrem	Innocent Eyes	
"Throwing Stones"	Milton Donald, Howard Donald, Jason Orange, Mark Owen	Take That	None	B-side
"Time and Time Again"	Howard Donald, Mark Owen, Ben Mark, Jamie Norton	Take That	This Life	
"To Love Again"	Alesha Dixon, John Shanks	Alesha Dixon	The Alesha Show: Encore	
"Today I've Lost You"	None	Take That	Forever... Greatest Hits	
"Together We Stand"	None	Ariana Greenblatt	The Boss Baby: Family Business	
"Trouble with Me"	John Shanks, Howard Donald, Jason Orange, Mark Owen	Take That	Patience (Australian release)	
"True to Yourself"	Andrew Murray, Sylvia Smith, Jane Vaughan	Vanessa Amorosi	Change	
"Turn the Light On"	Mark Owen, Eliot Kennedy	Mark Owen	In Your Own Time	
"Underground Machine"	Howard Donald, Jason Orange, Mark Owen, Robbie Williams	Take That	Progress	
"Up"	Howard Donald, Mark Owen, Ben Mark, Jamie Norton	Take That	Wonderland	
"Up All Night"	Ben Mark, Jamie Norton, Howard Donald, Jason Orange, Mark Owen	Take That	The Circus	
"Viva Tonight"	Andy Hill	Katherine Jenkins	Rejoice	
"Wait"	Howard Donald, Jason Orange, Mark Owen, Robbie Williams	Take That	Progress	
"Waiting Around"	None	Take That	Take That and Party (bonus track)	
"Walk"	None	Gary Barlow	Twelve Months, Eleven Days	
"Walkin' Away"	Graham Gouldman	Graham Gouldman	And Another Thing	
"Wasting My Time"	None	Take That	Everything Changes	
"Weakness"	Robbie Williams	Robbie Williams	Under the Radar Volume 2	
"Wedding Bells"	Robbie Williams	Robbie Williams	Swings Both Ways	
"We All Fall Down"	Steve Robson, Howard Donald, Jason Orange, Mark Owen	Take That	Beautiful World (bonus track)	
"We Like to Love"	None	Gary Barlow	Since I Saw You Last	
"We Love to Entertain You"	John Shanks, Howard Donald, Jason Orange, Mark Owen	Take That	None	("Shine" EU Single)
"What About Us"	Chris Braide	John Barrowman	Music Music Music	
"What Do You Want from Me?"	Howard Donald, Jason Orange, Mark Owen, Robbie Williams	Take That	Progress	
"What Good Is Love?"	Stephen Lipson, Chris Braide	Various	Britannia High Soundtrack	
"What I Meant to Say"	Donny Osmond, Eliot Kennedy	Donny Osmond	What I Mean to Say	
"What Is Love?"	Howard Donald, Jason Orange, Mark Owen	Take That	The Circus	
"What Leaving's All About"	None	Gary Barlow	Music Played by Humans	
"What You Believe In"	Anders Bagge, Howard Donald, Jason Orange, Mark Owen	Take That	Beautiful World	
"Whatever You Do to Me"	None	Take That	Everything Changes	
"When I Need You the Most"	Jörgen Elofsson, Wayne Hector	Lee Mead	Lee Mead	
"When We Were Young"	Howard Donald, Jason Orange, Mark Owen, Robbie Williams	Take That	Progressed	
"Whenever the Truth Lies"	Eliot Kennedy, Savan Kotecha	Sarah Whatmore		
"Whenever You're in Trouble"	Donny Osmond, Eliot Kennedy	Donny Osmond	What I Mean to Say	
"Where We Are"	Howard Donald, Mark Owen, Tim Woodcock	Take That	This Life	
"Who'd Have Known"	Lily Allen, Howard Donald, Greg Kurstin, Jason Orange, Mark Owen, Steve Robson	Lily Allen	It's Not Me, It's You	
"Who's Driving This Thing"	Tim Firth	Gary Barlow	Music Played by Humans	
"Why Can't I Wake Up With You"	None	Take That	Everything Changes; Take That and Party	
"The Winner's Song"	Peter Kay	Geraldine McQueen	None	ASCAP lists the performer as Take That.
"Will You Be There for Me"	Howard Donald, Mark Owen, Afshin Salmani, Josh Cumbee	Take That	III (2015 Edition)	
"Windows"	Howard Donald, Mark Owen	Take That	This Life	
"Without You"	Eliot Kennedy, Lucie Silvas	Various	Britannia High Soundtrack	
"Without Your Love"	Berenice Scott, Glenn Gregory	Kim Wilde	Fly (Songs Inspired by the Film Eddie the Eagle)	
"Wonderful World"	Howard Donald, Jason Orange, Mark Owen, Robbie Williams	Take That	Progressed	
"Wondering"	None	Gary Barlow	Twelve Months, Eleven Days	
"Wonderland"	Howard Donald, Mark Owen, Ben Mark, Jamie Norton	Take That	Wonderland	
"Wooden Boat"	Billy Mann, John Shanks, Howard Donald, Jason Orange, Mark Owen	Take That	Beautiful World	
"Yesterday's Girl"	None	Gary Barlow	Twelve Months, Eleven Days	
"You"	Howard Donald, Jason Orange, Mark Owen	Take That	The Circus	
"You and Me"	Howard Donald, Mark Owen	Take That	This Life (Deluxe)	
"You Are the One"	None	Take That	Everything Changes	
"You Make the Sun Shine"	None	Gary Barlow	Music Played by Humans	
"You're A Superstar"	Howard Donald, Mark Owen, Jamie Scott	Take That	TT10	
