= Gary Barlow in Concert =

Gary Barlow in Concert may refer to:

- Gary Barlow in Concert (2011–2013)
- Gary Barlow in Concert (2018)
