= Gary Barlow in Concert (2011–2013) =

2011–13 concert tour by Gary Barlow

- Tour by Gary Barlow
- Promotional poster for the tour
- Location: United Kingdom; Ireland
- Start date: 5 December 2011
- End date: 20 January 2013
- Legs: 2
- No. of shows: 27

Gary Barlow concert chronology
- GB40 (2011); Gary Barlow: In Concert (2011–13); Since I Saw You Last Tour (2014)

Leg 1 poster

Gary Barlow in Concert was the first full solo tour that Gary Barlow had performed in over 13 years. Leg 1 saw him performing songs from his "incredible music career spanning over 20 years" in front of a sell out audience, whilst also raising money for The Prince's Trust and The Royal Foundation during two nights at the Royal Albert Hall. It was announced on 15 October 2012 that Barlow would go on a full solo tour for his second leg of shows, lasting two months around the UK and Ireland.

== Background ==
Gary Barlow first teased about the first two concerts via his Twitter account, stating that he would be announcing "something special" soon. Soon after Barlow announced that he would play the Royal Albert Hall for two nights in December with all proceeds of the tour and merchandise sold that evening going directly to The Prince's Trust youth charity. Barlow said: "I hope the money raised through these concerts will make a real difference to young lives. It's really important to me that disadvantaged young people get the support they need, especially at the moment."

The tickets to the concert went on sale at 9am on Friday 28 October 2011 and were sold out 'in minutes'. Speaking about the reaction to the concerts, he said: "I've been overwhelmed at the response for both shows which sold out on Friday. Fans will be glad to know we've kept some [tickets] back with great views of the stage to auction off to the highest bidder so we can make as much money as we possibly can for The Prince's Trust."

Following from the success of his first leg of shows, Barlow announced on 15 October 2012 that he was to embark on his first full solo tour in thirteen years around the UK and Ireland. In a statement, he said, "I'm really excited about these dates. Playing live is my favourite thing and I haven't played a solo show for over a year now. Last year playing two London shows was brilliant, we all had such a good time, so I thought right let's get out and see the rest of the country!"

The tickets to Barlow's second leg solo concerts again sold out instantly after going on sale on 19 October, with tickets selling faster than those of The Rolling Stones for their comeback dates. Demand was so high for tickets that Barlow added more dates which also sold out instantly. It was also revealed by ticket marketplace SeatWave, that Gary Barlow's solo shows had sold six times more tickets than Robbie Williams' solo concerts, despite being on sale for a week less.

== Tour dates ==
Date	City	Country	Venue
Leg 1
5 December 2011	London	England	Royal Albert Hall
6 December 2011	London	England	Royal Albert Hall
Leg 2
13 November 2012	Bournemouth	England	Bournemouth International Centre
14 November 2012	Plymouth	England	Plymouth Pavilions
21 November 2012	Edinburgh	Scotland	Edinburgh Playhouse
22 November 2012	Nottingham	England	Nottingham Royal Concert Hall
27 November 2012	London	England	Royal Albert Hall
28 November 2012	Sheffield	England	Sheffield City Hall
6 December 2012	Manchester	England	O_{2} Apollo Manchester
7 December 2012	Manchester	England	Bridgewater Hall
27 December 2012	London	England	Hammersmith Apollo
28 December 2012	Newcastle	England	Newcastle City Hall
30 December 2012	Wolverhampton	England	Wolverhampton Civic Hall
31 December 2012	Oxford	England	New Theatre
2 January 2013	Liverpool	England	Philharmonic Hall
4 January 2013	Blackpool	England	Opera House Theatre
5 January 2013	Cardiff	Wales	Motorpoint Arena Cardiff
7 January 2013	Dublin	Ireland	Olympia Theatre
8 January 2013	Belfast	Northern Ireland	Waterfront Hall
10 January 2013	Glasgow	Scotland	Clyde Auditorium
11 January 2013	Aberdeen	Scotland	Press & Journal Arena
13 January 2013	Leicester	England	De Montfort Hall
14 January 2013	Southend	England	Cliffs Pavilion
16 January 2013	London	England	Hammersmith Apollo
17 January 2013	Brighton	England	Brighton Centre
19 January 2013	Scarborough	England	Futurist Theatre
20 January 2013	Manchester	England	O_{2} Apollo Manchester

== DVD release ==
It was announced that the date at the O2 Apollo on 6 December 2012 would be filmed for TV broadcast on ITV on New Years Day at 9pm for a TV special entitled Gary Barlow and Friends. The show features guest appearances from JLS, Peter Kay, Nicole Scherzinger, James Corden and Mark Owen. Barlow also announced via his Twitter account that there would be a DVD released of the tour.

The official announcement of the DVD appeared on the Take That website which said: "To celebrate the phenomenal success of his first full solo tour in 13 years, Gary invited cameras to film his 'Gary Barlow: in Concert' tour, his first ever solo live DVD." The 90 minute concert film omitted the tracks "Reach Out", "Like I Never Loved You Before", "Wasting My Time" and "Everything Changes" for unknown reasons. The track "Forever Autumn" was also omitted from the main film but is included in the bonus material. Also included were the alternative live versions of "Pray" with James Corden and "Back for Good" with JLS, along with a behind the scenes featurette.

=== Track listing ===
1. "Greatest Day"
2. "Open Road"
3. "A Million Love Songs"
4. "Pray"
5. "Back for Good"
6. "I'd Wait for Life"
7. "The Circus"
8. "Love Ain't Here Anymore"
9. "Lie to Me
10. "Why Can't I Wake Up with You"
11. "Forever Love"
12. "I've Got You Under My Skin"
13. "Moondance"
14. "Sing"
15. "Sunday to Saturday"
16. "Relight My Fire" (with Nicole Scherzinger)
17. "The Flood"
18. "Patience""
19. "Candy"
20. "Shine" (with Mark Owen)
21. "Rule the World"
22. "Never Forget"

Bonus material

1. "Pray" (with James Corden)
2. "Back for Good" (with JLS)
3. "Forever Autumn"
4. Behind the Scenes

== Attendees ==
It was announced that Charles, Prince of Wales, Camilla, Duchess of Cornwall, Prince William, Duke of Cambridge and Catherine, Duchess of Cambridge would attend one of the concerts and would meet and greet Barlow before and after the show.

== Reception ==
The media and fans alike praised the shows, with the Evening Standard stating "Last night's show, Barlow's second this year, was in aid of the Prince's Trust. For him, his solo career is there to be occasionally rekindled, but this was a spectacular statement of intent which took in a fusillade of Take That hits closing with Never Forget [which] was stomach-tighteningly magnificent." They concluded by stating that Barlow is "in grave danger of being anointed as a national treasure."

BBC reviewed the concert positively, calling it a "triumphant show" and praising Barlow's songs stating that they are "greeted with the rapture they deserve" whilst calling him the "most successful songwriter of his generation." In an article the next day they also revealed that the two concerts were expected to raise £400,000 for charity.

Morwenna Ferrier of The Daily Telegraph praised Barlow and the concert and stated "Within 24 hours, Gary Barlow — boy band veteran, reality TV judge and one time "least fanciable" Take That member — had switched deftly from The X Factor panel to the Albert Hall for this, his first of two UK solo shows in more than 11 years. It's a charity performance, for the Prince's Trust no less, because Barlow the artist doesn’t need any exposure: this is a songwriter who has colonised the charts for 20 years. But tonight, the air thick with screams, was his chance to hog the limelight with his carousel of hits. Just minutes in, Greatest Day, one of Take That's comeback hits, had the crowd throwing shapes. Barlow then took to the piano for his vaguely religious solo number, Open Road, inviting further applause. But it was the old ones, Back for Good and Everything Changes, songs that nail Barlow's precise blend of schmaltz and pop brilliance, which left grown women thrusting their polite "Mr B" banners high above their heads and screaming. So much screaming. "

Karen Edwards of The Huffington Post also praised the concert, saying many had "high expectations [but they] couldn't have prepared us for what the man had to offer. For an artist who only occasionally pulls out his solo plans for charity, he certainly pulled out the stops. He certainly never does things by halves." She concluded by stating "the fact is, he made a lot of people very happy last night. And tonight [December 6] he'll do it all again. But the best bit? The best bit is that it was all for The Princes Trust. A brilliant cause which will benefit greatly from a gifted man's good nature."
