= A Different Stage =

A Different Stage may refer to:

- A Different Stage (album), a 2017 album by Jason Manford
- A Different Stage (musical), a one-man show by Gary Barlow
