= Marcus Collins (album) =

Studio album by Marcus Collins
- Released: 9 March 2012
- Recorded: January–March 2012
- Length: 35:00
- Label: RCA; Syco; Sony
- Producer: Gary Barlow; Matt Furmidge; Lee McCutcheon; Paul Meehan; Brian Rawling; Alex Smith; Mark Taylor; Paul Meehan

Singles from Marcus Collins
- 1. "Seven Nation Army" Released: 4 March 2012; 2. "Mercy" Released: 1 June 2012

Marcus Collins is the self-titled debut studio album by English singer Marcus Collins, who was a finalist on the eighth series of The X Factor in 2011. The album was released in Ireland on 9 March 2012 and on 12 March 2012 in the UK.

== Background ==
For just the third time in the history of The X Factor, a judge continued to work with a contestant after the show; the first time being after Leona Lewis won the show's third series in 2006 and the second being after Jedward finished sixth in the show's sixth series in 2009. Collins' mentor Gary Barlow continued working with him after the final, and in December 2011, offered to join him in the studio to record some material to pitch to a record label. In January 2012, Collins signed a record deal with RCA Records, which would see his debut album be released in March 2012. Barlow subsequently offered to help write, oversee and produce the album. Collins began recording the album on 1 January 2012. The album's track listing was unveiled on 11 February 2012. It contains eight original recordings, as well as covers of "Seven Nation Army", "Tightrope" by American singer Janelle Monáe and Collins' version of "(Your Love Keeps Lifting Me) Higher and Higher", a song he performed on The X Factor.

In terms of the album's actual musical background, when questioned in May 2012 by Blues & Soul about its retro-Motown and northern soul influences Collins stated: "I absolutely love the fact you've just mentioned northern soul, because when we were in the studio that was something that we really CONNECTED to. You know, I was watching YouTube videos of all the dancing and things from way back that I'd never SEEN before. And, because I thought it was really cool, we did try and put as many references in there as we could from the Sixties and the artists from that time that had really inspired me – Diana Ross & The Supremes, The Temptations [...]."

== Singles ==
"Seven Nation Army" was released as the album's lead single on 4 March 2012. The audio premiered on 23 January, and the official music video was unveiled on 16 February. Collins performed "Seven Nation Army" live on 18 March 2011 on the seventh series of Dancing on Ice. It became a top ten hit on the UK Singles Chart, peaking at number nine. "Mercy" was released as the album's second single in June 2012.

== Critical reception ==
Professional ratings
Review scores
Source	Rating
Daily Express	4/5 stars
Digital Spy	3/5 stars
Female First	3/5 stars
Media Essentials	3.5/5 stars

Simon Gage from Daily Express awarded the album four stars out of five and stated that "On the show he came over as a modern-day Jackie Wilson, slick and sophisticated with a strong voice and an even stronger sense of his own style. This debut is a classy portion of pop-soul with character. He won't be Leona Lewis but he could well be Olly Murs." Digital Spy critic Lewis Corner found that the "singer offers few moments of spark on an frustratingly flat debut album [...] Overall, Collins has some strong moments on his debut that brim with potential. However, with a bit more time and investment he could have brought the rest up to the same standard and demonstrated the showman he could be."

== Commercial performance ==
In the United Kingdom, Marcus Collins debuted at number seven on the UK Albums Chart with first-week sales of 24,343 copies. In the album's second week in the charts, it fell to number 18 and on its third week it charted at number 38 before leaving the top 40. The album also peaked at number 24 in Ireland and number 8 in Scotland.

== Track listing ==
Marcus Collins track listing
No.	Title	Writer(s)	Producer(s)	Length
1.	"Seven Nation Army" (The White Stripes cover; based on the version by Ben l'Oncle Soul)	Jack White (arr. by Benjamin Duterde)	Matt Furmidge; Alex Smith; Brian Rawling	2:58
2.	"Love & Hate"	Mark Taylor; Marcus Collins; Jamie Scott; Patrick Mascall	Taylor	3:48
3.	"Innocence"	Collins; Smith; Paul Barry	Furmidge; Smith; Paul Meehan	3:17
4.	"Don't Surrender"	Collins; Meehan; Scott	Rawling; Meehan; Furmidge	3:48
5.	"Mercy"	Collins; Lee McCutcheon; Lisa Greene	Furmidge; McCutcheon	2:51
6.	"Higher & Higher" (Jackie Wilson cover)	Carl Smith; Raynard Miner; Gary Jackson	Furmidge	2:30
7.	"That's Just Life"	Collins; Taylor; Tim Woodcock	Taylor	2:49
8.	"Tightrope" (Janelle Monáe cover)	Antwan Patton; Nathaniel Irvin; Janelle Monáe Robinson; Charles Joseph	Rawling; Meehan; Furmidge	3:22
9.	"It's Time"	Collins; Ayak Thiik; Meehan	Rawling; Meehan; Furmidge	3:38
10.	"Feel Like I Feel"	Gary Barlow	Furmidge; Barlow	3:11
11.	"Break These Chains"	Collins; Meehan; Scott	Rawling; Meehan; Furmidge	2:27

== Charts ==
Weekly chart performance for Marcus Collins
Chart (2012)	Peak position
Irish Albums (IRMA)	24
Scottish Albums (OCC)	8
UK Albums (OCC)	7
UK Album Downloads (OCC)	15

== Release history ==
Marcus Collins release history
Region	Date	Format	Label	Ref(s)
Ireland	9 March 2012	CD; digital download	RCA Records; Syco Music; Sony Music	
United Kingdom	12 March 2012	CD; digital download	RCA Records; Syco Music; Sony Music	
