= Get Me Some (song) =

Single by Mercury4

from the album Mercury4
- Released: 2003
- Recorded: 2003
- Genre: Pop
- Label: BMG
- Songwriter(s): T La Verdi, D Pandher
- Producer(s): Best remix JR and Kenny Kens Electro Funk Mix.

Mercury4 singles chronology
"Get Me Some" (2003)	"5 Years from Now" (2004)

"Get Me Some" is the debut single by Australian group, Mercury4 released in 2003 from their self-titled debut album Mercury4. "Get Me Some" debuted and peaked at #5 on the Australian ARIA Singles Chart, but descended from then on and lasted a relatively short eight weeks on the chart. "Get Me Some" remains Mercury4's most successful single and only top ten single to date.

== Charts ==
Chart (2003)	Peak position
Australian ARIA Singles Chart	5
