= The Songbook Tour (2025) =

2025 concert tour by Gary Barlow

- Tour by Gary Barlow
- Location: Ireland; United Kingdom
- Start date: 17 April 2025
- End date: 21 June 2025
- No. of shows: 42
- Supporting acts: Brad Kella; Beverley Knight

Gary Barlow concert chronology
- All The Hits Live (2021); The Songbook Tour (2025)

The Songbook Tour was a concert tour by English singer-songwriter Gary Barlow. The 41-date tour around the United Kingdom and Ireland began on 17 April 2025 in Douglas on the Isle of Man and concluded on 21 June 2025 in Suffolk, England.

== Opening acts ==
- Brad Kella (Series 2 winner of The Piano) (17 April - 7 June)
- Beverley Knight (10 - 21 June 2025)

== Tour dates ==
Date	City	Country	Venue
17 April 2025	Douglas	Isle of Man	Villa Marina
18 April 2025	Douglas	Isle of Man	Villa Marina
20 April 2025	Killarney	Ireland	Gleneagle INEC Arena
22 April 2025	Belfast	Northern Ireland	Belfast Waterfront Hall
23 April 2025	Belfast	Northern Ireland	Belfast Waterfront Hall
25 April 2025	Dublin	Ireland	Olympia Theatre
26 April 2025	Dublin	Ireland	Olympia Theatre
28 April 2025	Liverpool	England	Empire Theatre
29 April 2025	Liverpool	England	Empire Theatre
1 May 2025	Cardiff	Wales	Utilita Arena
2 May 2025	Wolverhampton	England	Wolverhampton Civic Hall
3 May 2025	Wolverhampton	England	Wolverhampton Civic Hall
5 May 2025	Blackpool	England	Opera House Theatre
6 May 2025	Blackpool	England	Opera House Theatre
8 May 2025	Manchester	England	O2 Apollo Manchester
9 May 2025	Manchester	England	O2 Apollo Manchester
12 May 2025	London	England	Royal Albert Hall
13 May 2025	London	England	Royal Albert Hall
15 May 2025	Brighton	England	Brighton Centre
16 May 2025	Bournemouth	England	Bournemouth International Centre
19 May 2025	Sheffield	England	Sheffield City Hall
20 May 2025	Sheffield	England	Sheffield City Hall
22 May 2025	Stockton-on-Tees	England	Stockton Globe
23 May 2025	Stockton-on-Tees	England	Stockton Globe
24 May 2025	Aberdeen	Scotland	P&J Live
26 May 2025	Glasgow	Scotland	SEC Armadillo
27 May 2025	Glasgow	Scotland	SEC Armadillo
29 May 2025	Edinburgh	Scotland	Edinburgh Usher Hall
30 May 2025	Dundee	Scotland	Caird Hall Dundee
31 May 2025	Dundee	Scotland	Caird Hall Dundee
2 June 2025	Newcastle	England	Newcastle City Hall
3 June 2025	Newcastle	England	Newcastle City Hall
5 June 2025	Leicester	England	De Montfort Hall
6 June 2025	Nottingham	England	Nottingham Royal Concert Hall
7 June 2025	Nottingham	England	Nottingham Royal Concert Hall
10 June 2025	Halifax	England	Halifax Piece Hall
13 June 2025	Scarborough	England	Scarborough Open Air Theatre
14 June 2025	Cheshire	England	Delamere Forest
18 June 2025	Cornwall	England	Eden Project
19 June 2025	Surrey	England	Hampton Court Palace
20 June 2025	Blenhiem	England	Blenheim Palace
21 June 2025	Suffolk	England	Thetford Forest Park
