= Fly (Songs Inspired by the Film Eddie the Eagle) =

Soundtrack album by Various artists
- Released: March 18, 2016
- Genre: Mixed
- Length: 59m
- Label: UMC
- Producer: Gary Barlow

Fly (Songs Inspired by the Film Eddie the Eagle) was released as an accompanying soundtrack to the official film score from Eddie the Eagle. It is a collection of original songs curated by Gary Barlow, and includes tracks by some of the biggest names in 1980s pop music. The project was kicked off by film producer and director Matthew Vaughn, who asked Barlow to put together the album because he was reluctant to score the film with "overused" 80s hits. Barlow then went in search of his favourite 80s artists, doing his homework, to make sure they could all sing and perform again, by watching up to date YouTube footage.

Holly Johnson released the track "Ascension", co-written with Gary Barlow, as a single on February 3, 2016.

== Track listing ==
No.	Title	Artist	Length
1.	"Ascension"	Holly Johnson	5:10
2.	"Eagle Will Fly Again"	Howard Jones	4:06
3.	"Out of the Sky"	Marc Almond	4:26
4.	"Moment"	Tony Hadley	4:01
5.	"Touching Hearts and Skies"	Midge Ure	3:35
6.	"The Sky's the Limit"	Nik Kershaw	4:00
7.	"Living Inside My Heart"	ABC	3:59
8.	"Without Your Love"	Kim Wilde	4:12
9.	"Fly"	Andy Bell	4:21
10.	"Determination"	Go West	3:55
11.	"Pray"	Heaven 17	4:45
12.	"People Like You"	Paul Young	4:32
13.	"Thrill Me"	OMD & Taron Egerton & Hugh Jackman	4:01
14.	"Eddie the Eagle Theme"	Matthew Margeson	4:19
