= My Take =

2006 autobiography by Gary Barlow

- Author: Gary Barlow
- Language: English
- Genre: Autobiography
- Publisher: Bloomsbury Publishing
- Publication date: 21 September 2006
- Publication place: United Kingdom
- Media type: Print (Hardback)
- Pages: 278 pages
- ISBN: 978-0-7475-8764-4
- OCLC: 156747522

My Take is a 2006 autobiography by British singer/songwriter and lead member of Take That, Gary Barlow. My Take is his take on his childhood, breaking into the music scene, his years in Take That, after the band split, going solo and culminating in the reformation of the Take That to phenomenal success.

== Background information ==
Barlow had stated that he had begun writing 'a thin thing' that would have been nothing more than a collection of stories about his days in Take That, his time as a solo artist and his profession since he left the public spotlight, songwriting and producing for artists across the music scene. He stated that this short book was originally titled Backstage for Good, referencing his fall from superstardom during the late 1990s and how he no longer felt comfortable in the media spotlight, preferring to focus on his family and songwriting.

There are two versions of the book—the hardback which was released in 2006 and the paperback released a year later and updated with "the story of the comeback of all comebacks" with Take That reuniting for the first time in 10 years.

== Public appearances ==
Barlow appeared at a number of book shops and did various media interviews promoting My Take. He also visited Waterstones where he stayed to meet, pose for pictures and speak with every single person that had come for a book to be signed.

== 7 July 2005 terror attacks ==
Chapter 17, entitled Full Circle, is a short chapter about Gary's experience on 7 July 2005. Gary was on a tube train travelling from Edgware Road when a bomb went off on the train next to his. This chapter describes the aftermath and chaos of what happened that day; according to Barlow it changed the way he viewed his life.
