= 5 Years from Now =

"5 Years From Now"

Single by Mercury4

from the album Mercury4
- Released: 2004
- Recorded: 2003
- Genre: Pop
- Label: BMG
- Songwriters: L. Christy, S. Spock, G. Edwards
- Producer: The Matrix Siew

Mercury4 singles chronology
| "Get Me Some" (2003) | "5 Years From Now" (2004) | "Every Little Step" (2004) |

"5 Years From Now" is the second single released by Australian group Mercury4 from their self-titled debut album, Mercury4. "5 Years From Now" debuted at #20 on the Australian ARIA Singles Chart and peaked at #16 the following week, becoming Mercury4's second top twenty hit. Although "5 Years From Now" reached a lower peak than its predecessor, "Get Me Some", it lasted nine weeks on the chart, a week more than its processor. The song was produced by The Matrix.

== Track listing ==
| No. | Title | Writer(s) | Length |
|---|---|---|---|
| 1. | "5 Years From Now" | L. Christy, S. Spock, G. Edwards | 3:47 |
| 2. | "You Don't Treat Me No Good" | Daniel Pritzker | 3:18 |
| 3. | "Get Me Some (Quazimodo Brazil 66 Remix Edit)" | T. la Verdi, D. Pandher | 3:34 |
| 4. | "Years From Now (The 5-Year Plan Mix Featuring Stick Mareebo)" | L. Christy, S. Spock, G. Edwards | 3:51 |

== Charts ==
| Chart (2004) | Peak position |
|---|---|
| Australian ARIA Singles Chart | 16 |
