= Music Played by Humans =

Studio album by Gary Barlow
- Released: 27 November 2020
- Length: 50:26
- Label: Polydor
- Producer: Gary Barlow; Ryan Carline; Johan Carlsson; Jean Rodríguez; Carlos Sosa; James Wiltshire

Gary Barlow chronology
Since I Saw You Last (2013)	Music Played by Humans (2020)	The Dream of Christmas (2021)

Singles from Music Played by Humans
- 1. "Elita" Released: 30 September 2020; 2. "Incredible" Released: 30 October 2020; 3. "This Is My Time" Released: 13 November 2020; 4. "Enough is Enough" Released: 29 January 2021

Professional ratings
Review scores
Source	Rating
The Arts Desk	2/5 stars
Belfast Telegraph	8/10
The Telegraph	4/5 stars

Music Played by Humans is the fifth solo studio album by British singer-songwriter Gary Barlow. The album was released by Polydor Records on 27 November 2020 and is Barlow's first solo album in seven years, following Since I Saw You Last in 2013. The album's lead single, "Elita" features both Michael Bublé and Sebastián Yatra, and was released on 30 September 2020.

The album debuted at the top of the UK Albums Chart dated 4 December 2020, becoming Barlow's third solo number-one album in the UK.

== Background ==
Music Played by Humans is Barlow's first solo album since 2013's Since I Saw You Last, and "sees [him] add a contemporary take to the orchestral and big band music he fell in love with as a child". The album includes songs recorded with an 80-piece orchestra, and was preceded by the Latin-inspired lead single "Elita" featuring singers Michael Bublé and Sebastián Yatra. Music Played by Humans also includes collaborations with Beverley Knight, Alesha Dixon, Chilly Gonzales, Barry Manilow, Ibrahim Maalouf, Avishai Cohen and James Corden.

Barlow was nearing completion on Take That's Greatest Hits Live tour in support of 2018's Odyssey when he envisioned the concept for the record, including "full orchestras, swing bands and string quartets", and more than 100 musicians in total. He told BBC News: "I went to Universal, the record company, and I said, 'Listen, I have got this idea but can I just record three songs? I don't mean demos, I want to put the orchestra on, I want to mix it, I want to get right down the road with three songs'. And so I did: Big string sections, brass sections, the whole thing. I really wanted to know that it was right. Then I played it to them and they just said, 'Listen, just go and finish the bloody thing. It's fantastic.'"

== Singles ==
- "Elita," featuring Michael Bublé and Sebastián Yatra, was released as the album's lead single on 30 September 2020.
- "Incredible" was released as the album's second single on 30 October 2020.
- "This Is My Time" was released as the album's third single on 13 November 2020.
- "Enough is Enough," featuring Beverley Knight, was released as the album's fourth single on 29 January 2021.

== Commercial performance ==
The album debuted at number one on the UK Albums Chart, with sales of 46,406 units, earning Barlow his third number-one solo album.

== Track listing ==
All tracks are written by Gary Barlow, additional songwriters are noted below.

Standard edition track listing
No.	Title	Writer(s)	Producer(s)	Length
1.	"Who's Driving This Thing"	Tim Firth	Gary Barlow; Ryan Carline	4:12
2.	"Incredible"		Barlow; Carline	2:45
3.	"Elita" (featuring Michael Bublé and Sebastián Yatra)	Jean Rodriguez; Michael Bublé; Sebastián Yatra	Barlow; Carline; Yatra; Johan Carlsson; Andrés Guerrero Ruiz; Andres Munera; Fernando Tobon	3:30
4.	"The Big Bass Drum"		Barlow; Carline	3:35
5.	"This Is My Time"		Barlow; Carline	3:27
6.	"Enough Is Enough" (featuring Beverley Knight)		Carlos Sosa; Carline	3:26
7.	"Bad Libran"	Firth	Barlow; Carline	4:21
8.	"Eleven" (featuring Ibrahim Maalouf)		Barlow; Carline	3:54
9.	"Before We Get Too Old" (featuring Avishai Cohen)	Firth	Barlow; Carline	4:07
10.	"Supernatural"		Barlow; Carline	3:32
11.	"Oh What a Day" (featuring Chilly Gonzales)		Barlow; Carline	3:45
12.	"What Leaving's All About" (featuring Alesha Dixon)		Barlow; Carline	3:02
13.	"The Kind of Friend I Need" (featuring James Corden)	Firth	Barlow; Carline	4:03
14.	"I Didn't See That Coming"		Barlow; Carline	2:47
Total length:				50:26

Deluxe edition bonus tracks
No.	Title	Producer(s)	Length
15.	"Let's Get Drunk"	James Wiltshire; Carline	4:31
16.	"The Day the World Stopped Turning"	Barlow; Carline	3:52
17.	"You Make the Sun Shine" (featuring Barry Manilow)	Barlow; Carline	3:08
18.	"Incredible" (acoustic version)	Barlow; Carline	3:46
19.	"Incredible" (F9 Charleston remix)	Barlow; Carline	3:20
Total length:			69:03

== Personnel ==
=== Musicians and vocals ===
- Gary Barlow – vocals, additional programming (3), acoustic piano (8), keyboards (8, 10, 12, 14), programming (8, 10, 12)
- Ryan Carline – keyboards (1, 2, 5–13), programming (1, 2, 3, 5, 7–10, 12, 13), drum programming (1, 11), acoustic piano (3, 8, 12), electric piano (4, 8), synthesizers (8), bass (12, 14)
- Malcolm Edmonstone – acoustic piano (1, 2, 4, 7, 9, 13), string arrangements and conductor (2, 4, 8, 13), big band arrangements and conductor (9), orchestra arrangements and conductor (9, 11)
- James Wiltshire – keyboards (2, 4, 10), programming (2, 4, 10), drum programming (3), bass (4)
- Andres Munera – programming (3)
- Andrés Guerrero Ruíz – programming (3)
- Johan Carlsson – acoustic piano (3), programming (3), electric guitar (3), baritone guitar (3), drum programming (3), percussion (3), backing vocals (3)
- Fernando Toban – programming (3), electric guitar (3), 12-string acoustic guitar (3)
- Marlow Rosado – acoustic piano (6)
- Daniel K. Mandelman – organ (6)
- Michael Freeman – keyboards (8, 10), programming (8, 10)
- Chilly Gonzales – acoustic piano (11), keyboards (11)
- Tommy Emmerton – guitars (1, 9)
- Justin Quinn – nylon guitar (3), tres (3), guitars (8)
- Loz Garratt – bass (1)
- Guy Pratt – bass (2)
- Jo Nichols – bass (5)
- Luis Guerra – bass (6)
- Avishai Cohen – bass (9)
- Ralph Salmins – drums (1)
- Brad Webb – drums (2, 4, 10)
- Michael Longoria – drums (6)
- Doug Harper – drums (9)
- Lewis Wright – percussion (1), vibraphone (1)
- Ash Soan – percussion (2, 3, 10, 12)
- Alberto Lopez – percussion (6)
- Camilla Pay – harp (5, 9)
- Carlos Sosa – saxophones (6), horn arrangements (6)
- Raul Vallejo – trombone (6)
- Fernando Castillo – trumpet (6)
- Ibrahim Maalouf – trumpet (8)
- Ben Edwards – trumpet (12)
- Stella Le Page – cello (11)
- Evan Jolly – big band arrangements (1, 2, 10), string arrangements (1)
- Tom Richards – big band arrangements (1, 4, 7, 10, 13), string arrangements (1, 7), big band conductor (2, 4, 13), brass arrangements and conductor (3, 8, 11)
- Angela Ricci – backing vocals (1, 2, 10)
- Hayley Carline – backing vocals (2, 4)
- Michael Bublé – vocals (3)
- Sebastián Yatra – vocals (3)
- Peter Carlsson – backing vocals (3)
- Beverley Knight – vocals (6)
- Alesha Dixon – vocals (12), backing vocals (12)
- James Corden – vocals (13)
- Barry Manilow - piano (17)

=== Technical and design ===
- Ryan Carline – engineer, mixing (5, 7, 8, 9, 11–14)
- John Hanes – mix engineer (3)
- Mark "Spike" Stent – mixing (1, 2, 4)
- Matt Wolach – mix assistant (1, 2, 4)
- Serban Ghenea – mixing (3)
- Charlie Kramsky – mixing (6)
- Kevin Grainger – mixing (10)
- Randy Merrill – mastering at Sterling Sound (New York City, New York)
- Studio Fury – art direction, design
- Benjamin Lennox – photography

== Charts ==
=== Weekly charts ===
Weekly chart performance for Music Played by Humans
Chart (2020)	Peak position
German Albums (Offizielle Top 100)	64
Irish Albums (OCC)	10
Scottish Albums (OCC)	1
Swiss Albums (Schweizer Hitparade)	88
Taiwanese Albums (Five Music)	20
UK Albums (OCC)	1
UK Album Downloads (OCC)	5

=== Year-end charts ===
Year-end chart performance for Music Played by Humans
Chart (2020)	Position
UK Albums (OCC)	49

== Certifications ==
Certifications for Music Played by Humans
Region	Certification	Certified units/sales
United Kingdom (BPI)	Gold	100,000^{‡}
^{‡} Sales+streaming figures based on certification alone.
