= GB40 =

2011 concert by Gary Barlow

- Concert by Gary Barlow
- Date: 20 January 2011

Gary Barlow concert chronology
- For the Fans Tour (1999); GB40 (2011); Gary Barlow in Concert (2011–13)

GB40 was the first concert played by English singer-songwriter Gary Barlow as a solo artist in over 11 years and was held at the Shepherd's Bush Empire on 20 January 2011. The concert was organised by Barlow to celebrate his 40th birthday and his 20 years in the music industry with all money going to The Prince's Trust charity.

== Set list ==
1. "Greatest Day"
2. "Reach Out"
3. "Open Road"
4. "A Million Love Songs"
5. "Like I Never Loved You at All" (with Ellie Goulding)
6. "The Flood" (with Stuart Price)
7. "Eight Letters"/"Vienna" (with Midge Ure)
8. Medley:
  1. "I'd Wait for Life"
  2. "The Circus"
  3. "Love Ain't Here Anymore"
  4. "Why Can't I Wake Up with You"
9. "Forever Love"
10. "Sunday to Saturday"
11. "Wondering"
12. "This Time"
13. "Nobody Else"
14. "Back for Good" (with Chris Martin)
15. "Pray"
16. "Said It All" (with Take That)
17. "Shine" (with Take That)
18. "Patience"
19. "Never Forget"
20. "Rule the World"
21. "Cuddly Toy" (not broadcast on BBC Radio 2)
