= A Different Stage (musical) =

2022 one-man show by Gary Barlow

- Music: Gary Barlow
- Lyrics: Gary Barlow
- Book: Tim Firth
- Basis: The life of Gary Barlow
- Premiere: 10 February 2022: The Brindley, Runcorn
- Productions: 2022 UK Tour; 2022 West End

A Different Stage is a one-man show with music and lyrics by Gary Barlow and a book by Tim Firth. The show received its world premiere, close to Barlow's home town of Frodsham, in Runcorn at The Brindley in February 2022 before embarking on a tour around the UK.

The show tells the story of Barlow's life in his own words reflecting on his career, friendships and personal life.

Barlow worked on his first theatrical project in 2013 where he signed up to work on a new musical version of Finding Neverland which ran on Broadway for 17 months in 2015. Barlow then went on to co-write The Girls (later retitled in 2017 as Calendar Girls The Musical) which opened in London's West End in January 2017 before producing a UK & Ireland tour of the second Take That musical Greatest Days in 2017 which visited London and Germany.

== Productions ==
=== UK & Ireland Tour (2022) ===
On 20 January 2022, it was announced the show would premiere at The Brindley, Runcorn before embarking on a UK Tour. Further dates in Salford, Liverpool and Edinburgh were announced on 14 February. Additional dates were announced in York, Newcastle, Dublin, Southend, Portsmouth, Nottingham and a return to The Lowry in Salford. Further dates were added in Wolverhampton, Fordsham, Truro, Aylesbury & Cambridge.

Tour dates for 2022
Date	City	Country	Venue
10 February 2022	Runcorn	England	The Brindley
11 February 2022	Runcorn	England	The Brindley
12 February 2022	Runcorn	England	The Brindley
13 February 2022	Runcorn	England	The Brindley
14 February 2022	Runcorn	England	The Brindley
15 February 2022	Runcorn	England	The Brindley
22 February 2022	Salford	England	The Lowry
23 February 2022	Salford	England	The Lowry
24 February 2022	Salford	England	The Lowry
25 February 2022	Salford	England	The Lowry
26 February 2022	Salford	England	The Lowry
27 February 2022	Salford	England	The Lowry
15 March 2022	Liverpool	England	Playhouse Theatre
16 March 2022	Liverpool	England	Playhouse Theatre
17 March 2022	Liverpool	England	Playhouse Theatre
18 March 2022	Liverpool	England	Playhouse Theatre
19 March 2022	Liverpool	England	Playhouse Theatre
21 March 2022	Edinburgh	Scotland	Royal Lyceum Theatre
22 March 2022	Edinburgh	Scotland	Royal Lyceum Theatre
23 March 2022	Edinburgh	Scotland	Royal Lyceum Theatre
24 March 2022	Edinburgh	Scotland	Royal Lyceum Theatre
25 March 2022	Edinburgh	Scotland	Royal Lyceum Theatre
26 March 2022	Edinburgh	Scotland	Royal Lyceum Theatre
27 March 2022	Edinburgh	Scotland	Royal Lyceum Theatre
2 June 2022	Frodsham	England	Frodsham Community Centre
3 June 2022	Frodsham	England	Frodsham Community Centre
4 June 2022	Frodsham	England	Frodsham Community Centre
10 June 2022	York	England	Grand Opera House
11 June 2022	York	England	Grand Opera House
12 June 2022	York	England	Grand Opera House
27 August 2022	Cambridge	England	Arts Theatre
28 August 2022	Cambridge	England	Arts Theatre
27 September 2022	Truro	England	Hall for Cornwall
28 September 2022	Truro	England	Hall for Cornwall
29 September 2022	Truro	England	Hall for Cornwall
1 October 2022	Truro	England	Hall for Cornwall
4 October 2022	Salford	England	The Lowry
5 October 2022	Salford	England	The Lowry
6 October 2022	Salford	England	The Lowry
7 October 2022	Salford	England	The Lowry
8 October 2022	Salford	England	The Lowry
10 October 2022	Newcastle	England	Tyne Theatre
11 October 2022	Newcastle	England	Tyne Theatre
12 October 2022	Newcastle	England	Tyne Theatre
19 October 2022	Aylesbury	England	Waterside Theatre
20 October 2022	Aylesbury	England	Waterside Theatre
21 October 2022	Aylesbury	England	Waterside Theatre
22 October 2022	Aylesbury	England	Waterside Theatre
26 October 2022	Dublin	Ireland	Gaiety Theatre
27 October 2022	Dublin	Ireland	Gaiety Theatre
28 October 2022	Dublin	Ireland	Gaiety Theatre
29 October 2022	Dublin	Ireland	Gaiety Theatre
1 November 2022	Southend-on-Sea	England	Cliffs Pavilion
2 November 2022	Southend-on-Sea	England	Cliffs Pavilion
3 November 2022	Southend-on-Sea	England	Cliffs Pavilion
4 November 2022	Southend-on-Sea	England	Cliffs Pavilion
8 November 2022	Portsmouth	England	New Theatre Royal
9 November 2022	Portsmouth	England	New Theatre Royal
10 November 2022	Portsmouth	England	New Theatre Royal
11 November 2022	Portsmouth	England	New Theatre Royal
13 November 2022	Nottingham	England	Playhouse Theatre
14 November 2022	Nottingham	England	Playhouse Theatre
15 November 2022	Nottingham	England	Playhouse Theatre
16 November 2022	Wolverhampton	England	Wolverhampton Grand Theatre
17 November 2022	Wolverhampton	England	Wolverhampton Grand Theatre
18 November 2022	Wolverhampton	England	Wolverhampton Grand Theatre
19 November 2022	Wolverhampton	England	Wolverhampton Grand Theatre
20 November 2022	Wolverhampton	England	Wolverhampton Grand Theatre

=== West End (2022) ===
On 18 March 2022, it was announced the show would run in London's West End at the Duke of York's Theatre from 30 August 2022 for a limited run until 18 September 2022 which was then extended until 25 September 2022. It was later announced the show would run for two encore performances on 21 & 28 November 2022 at London's Savoy Theatre to close the tour for 2022.

== A Different Stage: The Book ==
In February 2022, Barlow announced a new book titled 'A Different Stage' to be released on 1 September 2022. The book will contain photography from Barlow's one-man show.

== Awards and nominations ==
=== Original London production ===
Year	Award Ceremony	Category	Nominee	Result
2023	WhatsOnStage Awards	Best New Play		Nominated
