= Marcus Collins =

English pop singer (born 1988)

- Born: Marcus Collins; 15 May 1988 (age 38); Crosby, Merseyside, England
- Genres: Pop, R&B
- Occupation: Singer
- Years active: 2011–present
- Label: RCA

Marcus Collins (born 15 May 1988) is an English singer who was a finalist on the eighth series of The X Factor in 2011. He was mentored by Take That frontman Gary Barlow, who continued to work with him on his debut album.

The self-titled album was produced by the London-based Metrophonic team, known for their work with Whitney Houston and Cher. It peaked inside the UK top 10 and spawned the single "Mercy". His debut single from the album was "Seven Nation Army", a cover of The White Stripes hit based on the version by Ben l'Oncle Soul, and also peaked inside the top 10.

== Career ==
=== Eton Road ===
Prior to his solo audition in 2011, Collins was a member of four piece boyband Eton Road, who rose to fame on the third series of The X Factor. Collins did not appear on The X Factor that year, but joined the band after original member Anthony Hannah left the band due to exhaustion. Anthony performed over 150 gigs with the band.

=== The X Factor (2011) ===
In 2011, Collins chose to audition as a solo artist for the eighth series of The X Factor in front of judges Louis Walsh, Gary Barlow, Kelly Rowland and Tulisa. His audition was successful as all four judges said yes and put him through to bootcamp. He then progressed through to judges' houses where he was put through to the live shows by Barlow in his Boys category (solo males aged 16–24) alongside Craig Colton, Frankie Cocozza and James Michael. He beat over 200,000 other contestants to earn his place in the grand final at Wembley Arena. Collins performed the following songs on The X Factor:

Show	Song choice	Theme	Result
Auditions	"Signed, Sealed, Delivered I'm Yours"	Free choice	Advanced
Bootcamp 1	"Born This Way"	Bootcamp challenge	Advanced
Bootcamp 2	"Kiss from a Rose"	Bootcamp songs	Advanced
Judges' houses	"One Big Family"	Free choice	Advanced
Judges' houses	"Rolling in the Deep"	Free choice	Advanced
Live show 1	"Moves like Jagger"	Britain vs America	Saved by Barlow
Live show 2	"Russian Roulette"	Love and heartbreak	Safe (7th)
Live show 3	"Are You Gonna Go My Way"	Rock	Safe (4th)
Live show 4	"Superstition/Need You Tonight"	Halloween	Safe (6th)
Live show 5	"Reet Petite"	Dancefloor fillers	Safe (2nd)
Live show 6	"Another One Bites the Dust"	Lady Gaga vs. Queen	Safe (4th)
Live show 7	"(Your Love Keeps Lifting Me) Higher and Higher"	Movies	Safe (4th)
Quarter-final	"I'm Your Man"	Guilty pleasures	Safe (3rd)
Quarter-final	"Lately"	Musical heroes	Safe (3rd)
Semi-final	"My Girl"	Motown	Safe (2nd)
Semi-final	"Can You Feel It"	Song to get you to the final	Safe (2nd)
Final	"Hey Ya!"	Free choice	Safe (2nd)
Final	"She's Always a Woman" (with Gary Barlow)	Mentor duet	Safe (2nd)
Final	"(Your Love Keeps Lifting Me) Higher and Higher"	Favourite performance	Final two
Final	"Last Christmas"	Christmas	Final two
Final	"Cannonball"	Winner's single	Final two

=== 2012: Debut album and Hairspray ===
In January 2012, Collins signed a record deal with RCA Records and announced that was set to release his debut studio album in March. On 21 January, it was announced that his debut single would be a cover of The White Stripes' "Seven Nation Army". The single was released on 4 March. It was an exact copy of an arrangement of the song previously recorded by French artist Ben l'Oncle Soul that had been a hit in Europe. The song received a mixed reception, with fans of The White Stripes comparing the song in unfavourable light to the original. The song charted at number nine on the UK Singles Chart and spent three weeks on the chart. Collins then released his self-titled debut album on 12 March 2012 and debuted and peaked at number seven on the UK Albums Chart. "Mercy" was released as the second single from the album, making it Collins' first self penned single. The music video for "Mercy" was released on 24 April 2012, with the single released on 3 June 2012. It was relatively unsuccessful, reaching only 194 on the UK Singles Chart, due to lack of proper promotion.

On 16 October 2012, it was announced that Collins would star as Seaweed Stubbs in the 2013 UK Tour of Hairspray, from February–September 2013. After completing the tour, Collins, Beth Tweddle and others took part in a world record-breaking charity skydive.

=== 2013–present ===
He has appeared in Kinky Boots the musical at The Adelphi Theatre in London's West End which stars Matt Henry and Killian Donnelly. On 27 September 2013, after finishing with Hairspray, Collins revealed that he had left RCA and signed with a new record company: "It was all mutually agreed. To be honest, it just didn't feel like we were going in the same direction. I loved working with them, but it just got to a point where we both could go either way." Regarding his new album, He announced that he would be back in the recording studio "for the majority of October". Regarding his new album, Collins explained: "We've got about seven or eight songs that we're going to put down. We've got some new tracks and we've got some acoustic ones that are a little bit different. [Acoustic songs are] something that I've done before, but the record label I was with previously had different ideas and that's kind of why we separated." As of 2023, neither a new recording contract or album have been confirmed nor released.

In 2023, he played the role of Andre in Mrs Doubtfire at the Shaftesbury Theatre in London West End

== Discography ==
=== Albums ===
Album	Album details	Peak chart positions		
Album	Album details	UK	IRE	SCO
Marcus Collins	Released: 9 March 2012; Label: RCA; Format: CD, digital download	7	24	8

=== Singles ===
Year	Title	Peak chart positions				Album
Year	Title	UK	HUN	IRE	SCO	Album
2012	"Seven Nation Army"	9	13	49	9	Marcus Collins
2012	"Mercy"	194	—	—	—	Marcus Collins

=== As featured artist ===
Year	Singles	Peak chart positions		
Year	Singles	UK	IRL	SCO
2011	"Wishing on a Star" (as part of The X Factor finalists 2011 featuring JLS and One Direction)	1	1	1

2023 The Choir of Man Christmas Album singing This Christmas
