= Since I Saw You Last Tour =

2014 concert tour by Gary Barlow

- Tour by Gary Barlow
- Promotional poster for the tour
- Location: Ireland; United Kingdom; United Arab Emirates
- Associated album: Since I Saw You Last
- Start date: 29 March 2014
- End date: 17 October 2014
- No. of shows: 18

Gary Barlow concert chronology
- Gary Barlow in Concert (2011–13); Since I Saw You Last Tour (2014); Gary Barlow in Concert (2018)

The Since I Saw You Last Tour was a concert tour by English singer-songwriter Gary Barlow in support of his fourth studio album Since I Saw You Last. The tour saw Barlow play some of the biggest arenas in the UK and Ireland performing both Take That and his solo material from his career spanning two decades as well as his new material.

== Background ==
Due to overwhelming demand, Barlow added a further four dates to the tour after the concert sold out less than 10 minutes after going on sale.

== Opening acts ==
- Eliza Doolittle

== Tour dates ==
Date	City	Country	Venue
29 March 2014	Belfast	Northern Ireland	Odyssey Arena
31 March 2014	Dublin	Ireland	3Arena
2 April 2014	Glasgow	Scotland	The SSE Hydro
3 April 2014	Leeds	England	First Direct Arena
5 April 2014	London	England	The O_{2} Arena
6 April 2014	London	England	The O_{2} Arena
8 April 2014	Birmingham	England	LG Arena
9 April 2014	Cardiff	Wales	Motorpoint Arena Cardiff
11 April 2014	Liverpool	England	Echo Arena Liverpool
12 April 2014	Newcastle	England	Metro Radio Arena
14 April 2014	Manchester	England	Phones 4u Arena
15 April 2014	Liverpool	England	Echo Arena Liverpool
17 April 2014	Nottingham	England	Capital FM Arena Nottingham
19 April 2014	Birmingham	England	LG Arena
20 April 2014	Sheffield	England	Motorpoint Arena Sheffield
22 April 2014	London	England	Royal Albert Hall
23 April 2014	Bournemouth	England	Bournemouth International Centre
17 October 2014	Dubai	United Arab Emirates	Dubai Media City

== DVD release ==
A DVD of the tour entitled Since You Saw Him Last: The Tour was recorded from a sold-out arena performance at the Manchester Arena and was released on 15 December 2014 in the UK.

== Reception ==
Reviews on the tour were largely positive. The Birmingham Mail commented positively saying "A thoroughly satisfactory evening's work, then, for one of Britain's most accomplished contemporary pop songwriters." with regional magazine, East Midlands Music, adding it was "a brilliant, entertaining evening".

== Charts ==
DVDs Chart (2014)	Peak position
Irish Music DVD Chart	3
UK Music DVD Chart	6
