= Mercury4 =

Australian boy band (2000–2004)

- Origin: Melbourne, Victoria, Australia
- Genres: Pop
- Years active: 2000–2004
- Label: BMG
- Past members: Rien Low; Brad Johnston; Javier Perez; Cole Rintoul; Kevin Layton

Mercury4 were an Australian boy band vocal quartet formed in 2000 with Rien Low, Brad Johnston, Javier Perez and Cole Rintoul. In early 2004 Perez was replaced by Kevin Layton. They issued a self-titled studio album, Mercury4 (May 2004) which reached the ARIA Albums Chart top 40. Their highest-charting single, "Get Me Some" (June 2003) had peaked at No. 5 on the related ARIA Singles Chart. It was followed by "5 Years from Now" (January 2004), which reached the top 20 and their cover version of Bobby Brown's "Every Little Step" (May 2004) peaked in the top 30. However, the group disbanded by late 2004.

== History ==
Mercury4 started in 2000 with Rien Low and Brad Johnston meeting and deciding to work together. Cole Rintoul joined in 2001 with Javier Perez joining in 2002. The band signed with BMG in late 2002 after a showcase gig at the Mercury Lounge, hence the name Mercury4.

BMG recruited hit production team the Matrix who had produced hits for Avril Lavigne and Hilary Duff to write and produce their first single "Get Me Some". Released in June 2003 in Australia, it arrived at No. 5 on the ARIA Charts the following month.

Their second single, "5 Years from Now", was released in January 2004 and reached No. 16 on the Australian charts in February 2004. The band's third single "Every Little Step" (May 2004) was a cover of Bobby Brown's 1989 single, and was produced by Cutfather & Joe who wrote and produced the Jamelia hit "Superstar". It reached No. 27.

In early 2004, Javier Perez left the band for personal reasons and was replaced by Kevin Layton. The band's self-titled debut Mercury4 was released on 31 May 2004, and included a cover of Air Supply's hit "All Out of Love" featuring vocals by Russell Hitchcock and Graham Russell from the original band. However, the album only charted for one week in Australia and the band were dropped from their label after BMG merged with Sony. The group disbanded by late 2004.

Member Kevin Layton auditioned for the 2009 series of Australian Idol but missed out on the Top 24. Rien Low auditioned for the 2011 series of The X Factor (Australia) but missed out on a spot in Natalie Bassingthwaighte's 'Over 25's' category, making the Top 12 but not the Top 6. He also auditioned for Season 2 of The Voice (Australia) but was unsuccessful.

== Members ==
- Brad Johnston (born 30 November 1981) – lead vocals
- Rien Low (born 22 February 1978);– lead vocals
- Javier Perez – lead vocals (2002–04)
- Cole Rintoul (born 27 November 1982) – lead vocals
- Kevin Layton (born 1 May 1982) – lead vocals

== Discography ==
=== Albums ===
List of albums, with selected details and chart positions
Title	Album details	Peak chart positions
Title	Album details	AUS
Mercury4	Released: May 2004; Label: BMG; Format: CD	32

=== Singles ===
List of singles, with selected chart positions
Title	Year	Peak chart positions	Album
Title	Year	AUS	Album
"Get Me Some"	2003	5	Mercury4
"5 Years from Now"	2004	16	Mercury4
"Every Little Step"	2004	27	Mercury4
