= Paul Meehan =

English cricketer

Personal information
- Full name: Paul Meehan
- Born: 12 March 1938 (age 88); Liverpool, Lancashire, England
- Batting: Right-handed
- Bowling: Slow left-arm orthodox

Domestic team information
- Years: Team
- 1966–1989: Wiltshire

Career statistics
Competition	LA
Matches	4
Runs scored	38
Batting average	9.50
100s/50s	–/–
Top score	20
Balls bowled	144
Wickets	2
Bowling average	79.00
5 wickets in innings	–
10 wickets in match	–
Best bowling	1/61
Catches/stumpings	–/–
- Source: Cricinfo, 12 October 2010

Paul Meehan (born 12 March 1938) is a former English cricketer. Meehan was a right-handed batsman who bowled slow left-arm orthodox. He was born in Liverpool, Lancashire.

Meehan made his Minor Counties Championship debut for Wiltshire in 1966 against Dorset. From 1966 to 1989, he represented the county in 84 Minor Counties Championship matches, the last of which came against Wales Minor Counties. Meehan also represented Wiltshire in the MCCA Knockout Trophy. His debut in that competition came against Cornwall in 1987. From 1987 to 1988, he represented the county in 4 Trophy matches, the last of which came against Cornwall.

Meehan also represented Wiltshire in List A cricket. His List A debut came against Hampshire in the 1972 Gillette Cup. Between 1972 and 1988, he represented the county in 4 List A matches, the last of which came against Essex in the 1988 NatWest Trophy. In his 4 matches, he scored 48 runs at a batting average of 9.50, with a high score of 20. With the ball he took 2 wickets at a bowling average of 79.00, with best figures of 1/61.
