= Mercury4 (album) =

Studio album by Mercury4
- Released: 31 May 2004
- Recorded: 2004
- Genre: Pop
- Label: BMG

Mercury4 is the debut, and only, album by boy band, Mercury4, which was released on 31 May 2004 and peaked at No. 32 on the ARIA Albums Chart.

== Making of the album and chart success ==
BMG recruited hit production team the Matrix who had produced hits for Avril Lavigne and Hilary Duff to write and produce Mercury4's first single "Get Me Some". Released in June 2003 in Australia, it rose to the top five of the ARIA Singles Chart in the following month.

Their second single "5 Years From Now" was released in January 2004 and reached the top 20 of the Australian charts in February 2004. The band's third single "Every Little Step", is a cover version of the Bobby Brown hit from his album Don't Be Cruel. This track was produced by Cutfather & Joe who wrote and produced the Jamelia hit, "Superstar".

The band's self-titled debut, Mercury4, was released on 31 May 2004. The album includes their version of Air Supply's hit single, "All Out of Love", with vocals by the group's lead singers, Russell Hitchcock and Graham Russell. The track features contributions by Kevin Layton who replaced Jarvier Perez who left the band in early 2004.

== Track listing ==
| No. | Title | Writer(s) | Length |
|---|---|---|---|
| 1. | "Prologue" | S. Melamed | 0:59 |
| 2. | "Get Me Some" | T. la Verdi, D. Pander | 3:41 |
| 3. | "Every Little Step" | Babyface, LA Reid | 3:29 |
| 4. | "Take It Back" | A. Love, J. Jorgensen | 3:33 |
| 5. | "5 Years From Now" | L. Christy, S. Spock, G. Edwards | 3:45 |
| 6. | "To Die For" | S. Lipson, D. Lew, W. Hector, N. Graham | 3:30 |
| 7. | "Temptation" | K. Beauvais, S Perry | 3:49 |
| 8. | "All Out of Love" | G. Russell, C. Davis | 4:56 |
| 9. | "Interlude" | S. Melamed | 0:10 |
| 10. | "Miss Sophisticated" | P. Wiltshire, V. Wu | 3:10 |
| 11. | "(Has Anybody) Seen My Girl" | M. Lister, L. Jensen, J. Joergensen | 3:20 |
| 12. | "In The Club" | C. Rintoul, A. Farrugia | 3:39 |
| 13. | "Interlude" | K. Layton | 0:46 |
| 14. | "Whatever Happens" | G. Barlow, E. Kennedy, Woodcock, Costa, Ingis, Ryan, Webbe | 3:28 |
| 15. | "Right Time" | C. Rintoul, A. Farrugia | 5:13 |
| 16. | "Sorry" | C. Rintoul, A. Farrugia, R. Low | 4:26 |
| 17. | "No Good in Goodbye" | G. Barlow, E. Kennedy, A. Cantrall, D Sharpe | 4:41 |
| 18. | "That's What Friends Are For" (bonus hidden track) | | 3:26 |

== Charts ==
Chart performance for Mercury4
| Chart (2004) | Peak position |
|---|---|
| Australian Albums (ARIA) | 32 |
