= Elita (song) =

2020 single by Gary Barlow, Michael Bublé and Sebastián Yatra

Single by Gary Barlow, Michael Bublé and Sebastián Yatra

from the album Music Played by Humans
- Released: 30 September 2020
- Recorded: 2020
- Length: 3:31
- Label: Polydor
- Songwriter(s): Gary Barlow; Jean Rodríguez; Michael Bublé; Sebastián Yatra
- Producer(s): Gary Barlow; Johan Carlsson; Sebastián Yatra; Ryan Carline; Andrés Guerrero Ruiz; Andres Munera; Fernando Tobon

Gary Barlow singles chronology
"Paddington Bear" (2019)	"Elita" (2020)	"Incredible" (2020)

Michael Bublé singles chronology
"Gotta Be Patient" (2020)	"Elita" (2020)	"Cuddle Up, Cozy Down Christmas" (2020)

Sebastián Yatra singles chronology
"A Dónde Van" (2020)	"Elita" (2020)	"Corazón Sin Vida" (2020)

"Elita" is a song performed by British singer-songwriter Gary Barlow, Canadian singer-songwriter Michael Bublé and Colombian singer-songwriter Sebastián Yatra. It was released in the United Kingdom on 30 September 2020 as the lead single from Barlow's fifth solo album, Music Played by Humans.

== Personnel ==
Credits adapted from Tidal.

- Andres Munera – producer, additional producer, associated performer, programming, recording engineer, studio personnel
- Andrés Guerrero Ruiz – producer, additional producer, associated performer, programming, recording engineer, studio personnel
- Fernando Tobon – producer, 12-string acoustic guitar, additional producer, associated performer, electric guitar, programming
- Gary Barlow – producer, composer, lyricist, additional producer, associated performer, programming, vocals
- Johan Carlsson – producer, associated performer, background vocalist, baritone guitar, drum programming, electric guitar, guitar, percussion, piano, programming, vocal producer
- Ryan Carline – producer, additional producer, associated performer, piano, programming, recording engineer, studio personnel
- Sebastián Yatra – producer, composer, lyricist, additional producer, associated performer
- Jean Rodríguez – composer, lyricist, vocals
- Michael Bublé – composer, lyricist, associated performer, vocals
- Amy Stewart – associated performer, orchestra conductor
- Ash Soan – associated performer, percussion
- James Wiltshire – associated performer, drum programming
- Justin Quinn – associated performer, nylon-string guitar
- Peter Karlsson – associated performer, background vocalist, vocal producer
- Tom Richards – associated performer, conductor, horn arranger
- Randy Merrill – mastering engineer, studio personnel
- John Hanes – mix engineer, studio personnel
- Serban Ghenea – mixer, studio personnel
- Mat Bartram – recording engineer, studio personnel

== Charts ==
Chart performance for "Elita"
Chart (2020)	Peak position
Global LyricFind Songs (Billboard)	6
Scotland (OCC)	21
Slovakia (Rádio Top 100)	93
UK Singles Downloads (OCC)	14
