= Gary Barlow in Concert (2018) =

2018 concert tour by Gary Barlow

- Tour by Gary Barlow
- Promotional poster for the tour
- Location: Ireland; United Kingdom
- Start date: 16 April 2018
- End date: 23 June 2018
- No. of shows: 49

Gary Barlow concert chronology
- Since I Saw You Last Tour (2014); Gary Barlow in Concert (2018); All the Hits Live (2021)

Gary Barlow in Concert (also known as The Theatre Tour) was a concert tour by English singer-songwriter Gary Barlow. The 49-date tour around the United Kingdom and Ireland began on 16 April 2018 in Edinburgh, Scotland and concluded on 23 June 2018 in Nottinghamshire, England. Tickets on sale were sold out in less than a day due to high demand.

== Opening act ==
- KT Tunstall (16 April to 26 May)
- Jason Brock (28 May to 23 June)

== Tour dates ==
Date	City	Country	Venue
16 April 2018	Edinburgh	Scotland	Edinburgh Playhouse
17 April 2018	Edinburgh	Scotland	Edinburgh Playhouse
19 April 2018	Perth	Scotland	Perth Concert Hall
20 April 2018	Dundee	Scotland	Caird Hall
21 April 2018	Aberdeen	Scotland	BHGE Arena
23 April 2018	Hull	England	Hull City Hall
24 April 2018	Hull	England	Hull City Hall
26 April 2018	Leicester	England	De Montfort Hall
27 April 2018	Blackpool	England	Opera House Theatre
28 April 2018	Blackpool	England	Opera House Theatre
30 April 2018	Sunderland	England	Sunderland Empire
1 May 2018	Sunderland	England	Sunderland Empire
3 May 2018	Manchester	England	O2 Apollo Manchester
4 May 2018	Manchester	England	O2 Apollo Manchester
5 May 2018	Manchester	England	O2 Apollo Manchester
7 May 2018	Belfast	Northern Ireland	Belfast Waterfront
8 May 2018	Belfast	Northern Ireland	Belfast Waterfront
10 May 2018	Dublin	Ireland	Bord Gáis Energy Theatre
11 May 2018	Dublin	Ireland	Bord Gáis Energy Theatre
12 May 2018	Killarney	Ireland	INEC Killarney
14 May 2018	Brighton	England	Brighton Centre
15 May 2018	Cardiff	Wales	Motorpoint Arena
17 May 2018	London	England	London Palladium
18 May 2018	London	England	London Palladium
19 May 2018	London	England	London Palladium
21 May 2018	Llandudno	Wales	Venue Cymru
22 May 2018	Llandudno	Wales	Venue Cymru
24 May 2018	Halifax	England	Victoria Theatre
25 May 2018	Nottingham	England	Royal Concert Hall
26 May 2018	Nottingham	England	Royal Concert Hall
28 May 2018	Douglas	Isle of Man	Villa Marina
29 May 2018	Douglas	Isle of Man	Villa Marina
31 May 2018	Southend	England	Cliffs Pavilion
1 June 2018	Bournemouth	England	Bournemouth International Centre
2 June 2018	Bournemouth	England	Bournemouth International Centre
4 June 2018	Sheffield	England	Sheffield City Hall
5 June 2018	Sheffield	England	Sheffield City Hall
6 June 2018	Cornwall	England	Eden Project
8 June 2018	Thetford	England	High Lodge
9 June 2018	Cheshire	England	Delamere Forest
11 June 2018	Portsmouth	England	Portsmouth Guildhall
12 June 2018	Portsmouth	England	Portsmouth Guildhall
14 June 2018	Birmingham	England	Symphony Hall Birmingham
15 June 2018	Birmingham	England	Symphony Hall Birmingham
17 June 2018	Blenheim	England	Blenheim Palace
19 June 2018	Hampton	England	Hampton Court Palace
20 June 2018	Hampton	England	Hampton Court Palace
22 June 2018	Scarborough	England	Scarborough Open Air Theatre
23 June 2018	Nottinghamshire	England	Sherwood Pines Forest
