= The Dream of Christmas =

Studio album by Gary Barlow
- Released: 26 November 2021
- Length: 32:11
- Label: Polydor

Gary Barlow chronology
Music Played by Humans (2020)	The Dream of Christmas (2021)

Singles from The Dream of Christmas
- 1. "Sleigh Ride" Released: 29 October 2021; 2. "The Dream of Christmas" Released: 29 October 2021; 3. "How Christmas Is Supposed to Be" Released: 24 November 2021

The Dream of Christmas is the sixth solo studio and first Christmas album by English singer-songwriter Gary Barlow, released on 26 November 2021 through Polydor Records. The album includes collaborations with actress and singer Sheridan Smith, vocal trio the Puppini Sisters, cellist Sheku Kanneh-Mason and Welsh singer Aled Jones. It was preceded by the singles "Sleigh Ride", the title track, "The Dream of Christmas", and on 24 November 2021, "How Christmas Is Supposed to Be" featuring Sheridan Smith. Barlow toured in the UK in support of the album on his All the Hits Live Tour from 27 November 2021.

== Background ==
Barlow began writing original songs for and working on the album due to the COVID-19 pandemic in 2020, also saying that he "had never listened to those classic Christmas songs with the idea of singing them myself, but as this record evolved, so did my appreciation for these wonderful songs. It all started off as a bit of a dalliance in the studio and before I knew it, I had a whole album!"

== Track listing ==
The Dream of Christmas track listing
No.	Title	Writer(s)	Length
1.	"The Dream of Christmas"	Gary Barlow	3:32
2.	"Sleigh Ride"	Leroy Anderson	2:56
3.	"Wonderful Christmastime"	Paul McCartney	2:25
4.	"How Christmas Is Supposed to Be" (featuring Sheridan Smith)	Barlow	2:39
5.	"This Christmas"	Donny Hathaway; Nadine McKinnor	2:43
6.	"Come on Christmas"	Barlow	3:44
7.	"My Dear Acquaintance"	Paul Horner; Peggy Lee	2:39
8.	"Winter Wonderland" (featuring the Puppini Sisters)	Felix Bernard	2:06
9.	"The Colder It Feels" (featuring Sheku Kanneh-Mason)	Barlow	2:53
10.	"Merry Christmas Everyone"	Bob Heatlie	2:41
11.	"A Child's Christmas in Wales" (featuring Aled Jones)	Barlow; Dylan Thomas; Al Lewis; Arwel Lloyd Owen	3:53
Total length:			32:11

Deluxe edition bonus tracks
No.	Title	Writer(s)	Length
12.	"I've Got My Love to Keep Me Warm"	Irving Berlin	2:39
13.	"I Believe in Father Christmas"	Greg Lake; Peter Sinfield	3:25
14.	"In the Bleak Midwinter"	Christina Rossetti	3:24
15.	"It's the Most Wonderful Time of the Year"	Edward Pola; George Wyle	3:07
16.	"Christmas Sweater"	Barlow; Lorne Balfe; Michael Bublé; Jane Goldman; Matthew Vaughn	4:04
Total length:			48:50

== Charts ==
Chart performance for The Dream of Christmas
Chart (2021)	Peak position
German Albums (Offizielle Top 100)	90
Irish Albums (OCC)	34
Scottish Albums (OCC)	5
Swiss Albums (Schweizer Hitparade)	99
Taiwanese Albums (Five Music)	18
UK Albums (OCC)	5
