= The Brindley =

Arts centre in Runcorn, Cheshire, England

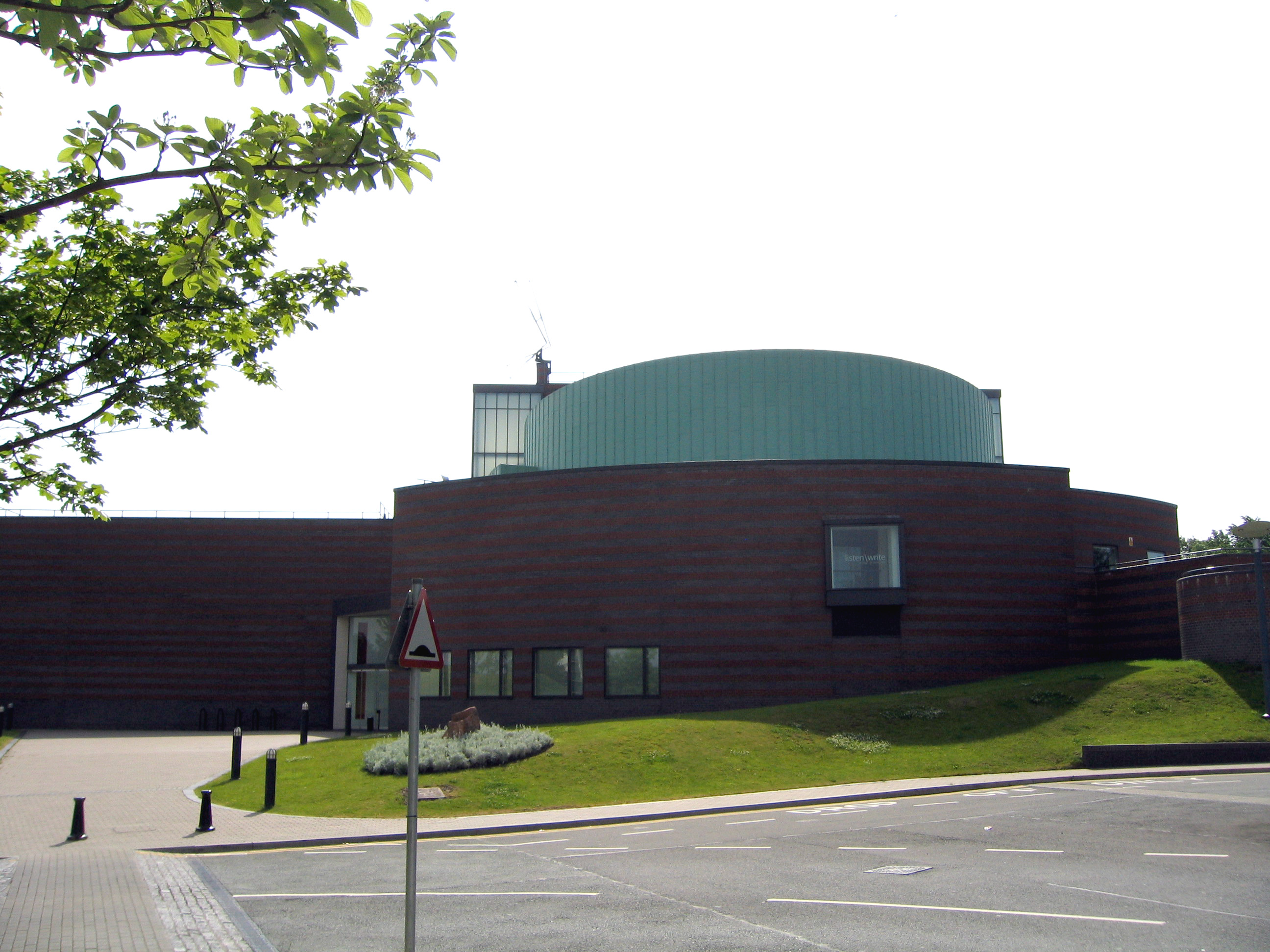
- Exterior view of the entrance to The Brindley
- Interactive map of The Brindley
- Address: High Street, Runcorn WA7 1BG
- Coordinates: 53.3406°N 2.7315°W
- Owner: Halton Borough Council
- Capacity: 420 theatre / 108 studio
- Type: Theatre

Construction
- Opened: September 2004; 21 years ago
- Architects: John Miller and Partners
- Structural engineers: Dewhurst Macfarlane & Partners
- Services engineer: SVM
- Main contractors: G&J Sedden

Website
- thebrindley.org.uk

The Brindley is a theatre in the town of Runcorn, Cheshire, England. Located by the Bridgewater Canal, the centre is named after the canal's engineer, James Brindley. It opened in autumn 2004; the architects were John Miller and Partners. The building is owned and operated by Halton Borough Council.

== Design and construction ==
Halton Borough Council were concerned about the building's impact on the environment and about its energy requirements. Therefore "low energy, high efficiency techniques" were used in its construction. These include a TermoDeck slab system, a storage technique for controlling the environment within large and medium-sized buildings using hollow cores within pre-cast concrete floor slabs as ventilation ducts.

== Facilities ==
The venue consists of a 420-seat main auditorium playing host to touring productions, a professional pantomime each Christmas season, local amateur shows and in-house productions, a 108-seat studio which also serves as a single screen cinema, an exhibition and gallery space, an education room, a dark room, a digital imaging room, dressing rooms, a meeting room, a bar and a café overlooking the Bridgewater Canal.

== Awards ==
The centre has won several awards for its architecture: The Centre Vision Award from The Civic Trust in 2005, the Excellence in Access award from the ADAPT Trust (Access for Disabled People to Arts Premises Today), and the Architectural Award from the Royal Institute of British Architects. RIBA praised the building for fitting into its context, using the canal-side location to give views, and making good use of its budget. It also won the Open Award for Technical Excellence in Architectural Technology 2008.

For its community activities, The Brindley won the title Best Arts Project in the UK at The National Lottery Awards in 2007. In May 2008, the theatre won the Best Performance Venue Award at the Mersey Partnership Tourism Awards 2008.
