= Gary Barlow =

British singer (born 1971)

Gary Barlow OBE
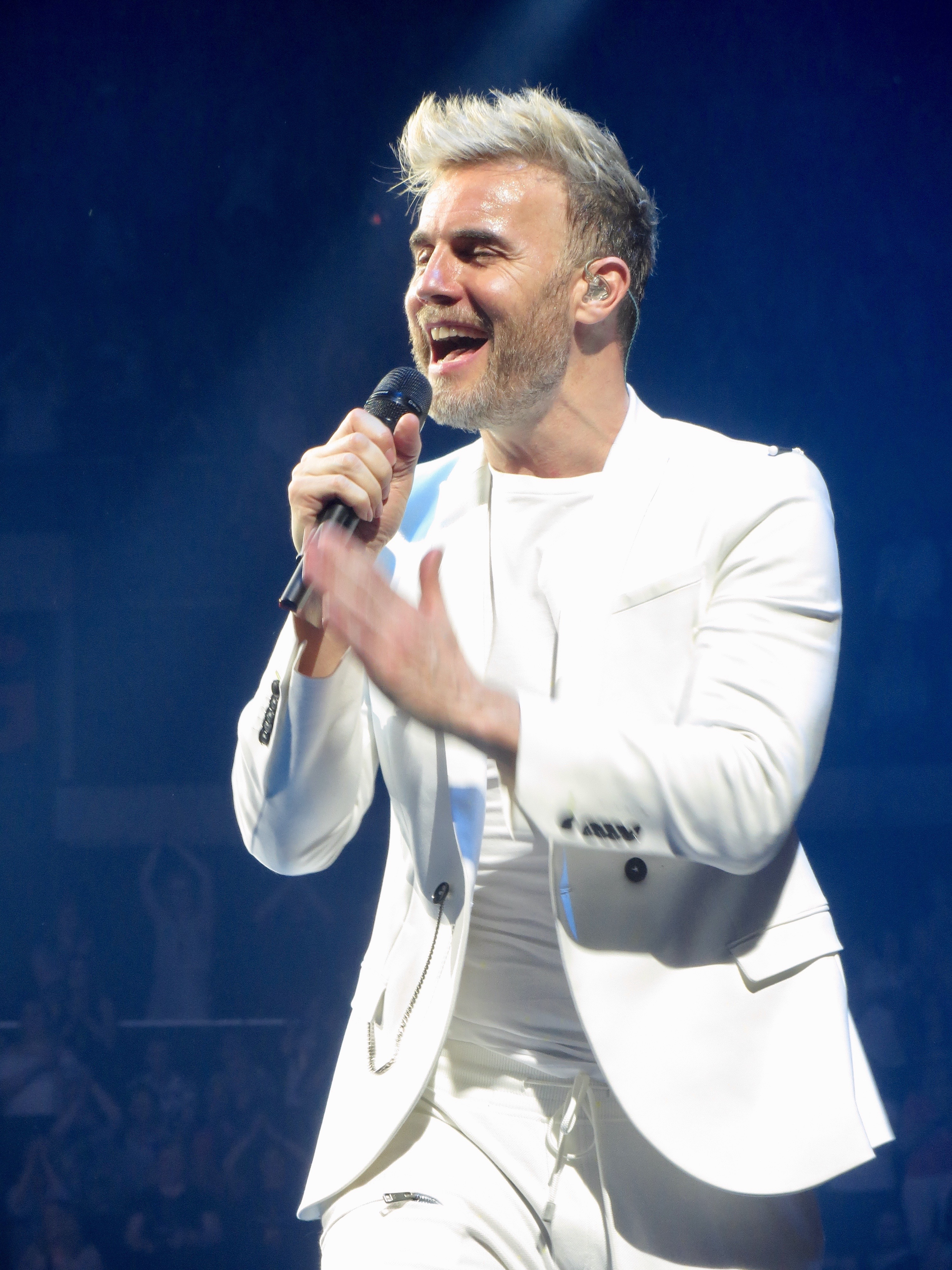
- Barlow performing in Glasgow in 2017
- Born: 20 January 1971 (age 55); Frodsham, Cheshire, England
- Occupations: Singer; songwriter; record producer; television personality
- Years active: 1984–present
- Spouse: Dawn Andrews (m. 2000)
- Children: 4
- Musical career
- Genre: Pop
- Instruments: Vocals; piano; keyboards
- Works: List of written songs
- Labels: Sony; Polydor; Universal; Decca; Atlantic; Future; San Remo
- Publisher: Sony Music Publishing
- Member of: Take That
- Website: www.garybarlow.com

Gary Barlow (born 20 January 1971) is an English singer, songwriter, record producer, pianist, and television personality. He is the lead vocalist of the pop group Take That.

Barlow is one of the United Kingdom's most successful songwriters, having written fifteen number-one singles (twelve with Take That, two solo, one with the Robbie Williams song "Candy") and twenty-four top-ten hits. As a solo artist, he has had three number-one singles, six top-ten singles and three number-one albums, and has additionally had seventeen top-five hits, twelve number-one singles and nine number-one albums with Take That. Barlow has also served as a judge on the television talent shows The X Factor UK (2011–2013), Let It Shine (2017) and Walk the Line (2021).

Barlow has received six Ivor Novello Awards from the British Academy of Songwriters, Composers and Authors, including the award for Outstanding Services to British Music. Barlow was appointed an Officer of the Order of the British Empire (OBE) at the 2012 Queen's Birthday Honours for his services to the entertainment industry and charity. He has sold over 50 million records worldwide. According to the British Phonographic Industry (BPI), Barlow as a solo artist has been certified for 1.1 million albums and 1.8 million singles in the UK.

== Early life and influences ==
Gary Barlow was born on 20 January 1971 in Frodsham, Cheshire, the second son of Colin (died 15 October 2009) and Marjorie Barlow (née Cowan). He attended Weaver Vale Primary School, and moved on to Frodsham High School in 1982. In Barlow's autobiography, he relates that his love of music began at an early age, and calls himself "one of those kids that's forever dancing in front of the TV looking at [his] reflection". He was heavily influenced by late 1970s and 1980s pop music. At age 10, after watching Depeche Mode perform on Top of the Pops, Barlow acquired his first keyboard; he practiced constantly thereafter. Barlow has also cited Elton John, Trevor Horn and OMD as important early influences. The first CD he bought was by the Pet Shop Boys, who later supported Take That on the Progress Live tour in 2011.

In 1986, when Barlow was 15 years old, he entered a BBC Pebble Mill at One Christmas song competition with "Let's Pray for Christmas". After reaching the semi-finals, he was invited to London's West Heath Studios to record his song. This inspired him to perform on the northern club circuit, singing cover versions and his own songs.

In 1989, Barlow appointed Wigan show business agent Barry Woolley to be his manager and recorded a single ("Love Is in the Air") under the name Kurtis Rush. Barlow was eventually put in touch with casting agent Nigel Martin-Smith, by celebrity photographer Doc Braham, who took Barlow's first professional head-shots. Martin-Smith eventually decided to use Barlow as the lead singer after being impressed by his self-written material, including an early demo tape of Barlow's "A Million Love Songs", concluding that the band should be built around Barlow's vocals and songwriting skills.

== History ==
=== 1989–1996: Take That ===
Barlow, who wrote the majority of the group's songs, is widely recognised as the lead singer of Take That. After selecting Barlow as the group's lead singer, Nigel Martin-Smith introduced Howard Donald, Jason Orange, Mark Owen and finally Robbie Williams to the fold. The group were signed to RCA Records, and after a number of top-40 hits, eventually secured their first number-one with Barlow's "Pray". Previous hits included "A Million Love Songs", "It Only Takes a Minute" and "Could It Be Magic". The debut album Take That & Party was released on 17 August 1992 and reached number two in the UK Album Chart. The following year saw the release of their second album, Everything Changes based on Barlow's own material. It went straight in at number one in the UK Albums Chart and spawned four number-one singles, as well as "Why Can't I Wake Up with You" and "Love Ain't Here Anymore" hitting numbers two and three respectively.

Barlow received an Ivor Novello Award for Best Contemporary Song in 1994 for the number-one hit song "Pray" included on the album. In 1994, alongside Rick Astley, Barlow did backing vocals for Elton John's version of "Can You Feel the Love Tonight" from The Lion King. Take That's third album Nobody Else, again based on Barlow's own material, went straight to number one and was to be their last studio album of the 1990s. The album had three number-one singles, including Barlow's "Back for Good" which peaked at number seven on the US Billboard Hot 100 and was brought forward an unprecedented six weeks before its official release such was the demand for the single. A Greatest Hits collection followed again reaching number one. The album featured the band's eighth number-one single "How Deep Is Your Love". This was to be the first single released by Take That as a four-piece (without Robbie Williams) and it was their last single until they reformed in 2005.

Barlow didn't sing for a long time after the end of Take That, noting that with the success of Williams as a solo artist, feeling that 'there wasn't room for two'.

I spent years telling everyone around me 'I'll never be an artist again, never want to sing again', and didn't...subsequently didn't sing for about six, seven years. And until I heard the first Coldplay album and for the first time in years, I could see a place again.

— Gary Barlow, Talking in 2011 on BBC Radio 2

=== 1996–1998: Solo career and Open Road ===
Barlow had grand ambitions for his solo career because he said "everyone" pushed him to "be the next George Michael." His first two solo singles, "Forever Love" (released July 1996) and "Love Won't Wait" (composed by Madonna and Shep Pettibone), both leapt to the number one spot in his home country. "Forever Love" was also used as the soundtrack to the film The Leading Man. His debut album Open Road reached number one in the UK Albums Chart and went on to sell 2 million copies worldwide. Barlow's first single to be released in the United States as a solo artist was "So Help Me Girl", which reached number 44 on the Billboard Hot 100 singles chart and number one on the US Billboard Adult Contemporary chart. He then achieved another top-ten hit in the UK with "Open Road" peaking at number seven.

=== 1999–2004: Twelve Months, Eleven Days, and producing career ===
After the success of his first solo album, Barlow released his second LP Twelve Months, Eleven Days in 1999. Barlow released "Stronger" as the lead single preceding the album. The single peaked at number 16. The album's second single, "For All That You Want", also received minimal radio play and peaked at number 24; however, it nearly reached the top five in Finland. Twelve Months, Eleven Days received little promotion and peaked at number 35, which led to Sony recalling the album's scheduled third single, "Lie to Me". This decision resulted in Barlow and BMG parting company.

In late 1999, Barlow quit his career as a singer, with his final single remaining unreleased. From 2000 to 2004, he was a producer for other artists, including bandmate Mark Owen's solo projects. In 2005, he resumed his singing career after a six-year hiatus.

=== 2005–2011: Take That reunion and Shame ===
Barlow returned to the spotlight in a successful TV documentary, Take That: For the Record in 2005. Following this success and renewed interest, Take That experienced a career renaissance in 2005 when the post-Williams line-up reformed for a sell-out arena/stadium tour. The band released their comeback single "Patience" which went to number one for four weeks while also topping the charts across Europe. Patience was also voted the Record of the Year in 2006 and won a Brit Award for single of the year. This was followed with "Shine" which became the band's tenth number-one single. Take That's first album of new material in over ten years, Beautiful World was released on 24 November 2006. The album peaked at number one in the UK Album Chart selling over 2.8 million copies in the UK alone as of 2012. It was re-released as a tour edition with hit single "Rule the World" in 2007 and peaked again at number one.

In 2008, the band were nominated for four Brit Awards (Best British Group, Best British Album, Best British Single and Best British Live Act). They won Best British Single and Best British Live Act. After great success in 2006, Take That released the single "Greatest Day" which went straight to number one and became their eleventh number-one single in the UK. The week after they released their second album since their reunion in 2006, The Circus. The Circus album was also a great success for Take That going straight to the top of the UK album chart and selling over 2.2 million copies in the country, going multi-platinum within four days of its release. In June and July 2009, Take That performed a record-breaking tour named Take That Present: The Circus Live throughout the United Kingdom and it sold over one million tickets in just five hours.

Barlow's first solo release since 1999 was a duet with reconciled Take That bandmate Robbie Williams on a single entitled "Shame". The single was written by both Barlow and Williams after they began to work together in Los Angeles on new material for a new Take That album following Williams' return to the band. On the first day of the song being released to the radio and the media, "Shame" received an unprecedented 694 plays on the radio and 153 plays on TV. The single peaked at number 2 in the UK, selling 224,000 copies and being certified as Silver by the BPI, while also charting in 21 countries worldwide.

It was announced that Barlow was in the process of writing Take That's much-anticipated sixth studio album, set for release in late 2010. The album, Progress, was the first to feature the original line-up since their 1995 album, Nobody Else. The band also announced a stadium tour entitled Progress Live which took place in 2011. The tickets for the tour went on sale on 29 October 2010. Due to unprecedented high public demand for tickets, Ticketmaster websites across the UK and Ireland crashed and all initial tour dates sold out in under 15 minutes. It was reported that a record breaking one million tickets were sold on the first day of sale, resulting in Take That beating the previous box office record of tickets sold which was set in 2008 by Take That Present: The Circus Live. Due to unprecedented demand Take That added more dates to their tour, finishing in the UK with a record breaking eight consecutive nights at Wembley Stadium. The 2011 run would form part of the biggest selling UK tour, with 623,737 tickets sold across the eight dates.

The lead single from Progress was announced as "The Flood". The single debuted at number two, selling over 500,000 copies. On the first day of the release of Progress, the album sold over 235,000 copies across the UK, making it the fastest-selling record of the century. On 21 November 2010, Progress debuted at number one in the United Kingdom, becoming the band's seventh number-one album. By the end of its first week on sale the album sold over 520,000, making it the second fastest-selling album of all time in UK chart history. To date Progress has sold 2.4 million copies in the UK and has achieved similar chart success across Europe. In June 2011, Take That released their first extended play collection entitled Progressed which returned the band to number one in the UK on its first week of release as well as charting across Europe.

=== 2012–2014: Return to solo projects, Sing and Since I Saw You Last ===
In April 2012, Barlow recorded a cover of "Here Comes the Sun" that was used in the 2012 summer promotion advertisement for Marks and Spencer with him appearing in the advert at the end performing the song. In November 2012, Barlow appeared on Jeff Wayne's Musical Version of The War of the Worlds – The New Generation, a re-working of his 1978 album of the same name. He portrayed the sung thoughts of the journalist and appeared in the songs “The Eve of the War”, “Forever Autumn”, and “Dead London (Part 2)”, replacing Justin Hayward from the original.

Barlow was featured in a duet with Agnetha Fältskog (from ABBA) on her 2013 album A, released in May 2013. Barlow co-wrote the song, "I Should've Followed You Home" with album producer Jörgen Elofsson. Early press reports tagged the song as a likely single with strong chart potential leading to Universal Music scheduling it to be released as the third single from the album in November 2013. The single became a top 5 hit in Sweden on the week of its release as well as charting in the UK.

It was announced in January 2012 that Barlow and Andrew Lloyd Webber would be working together to write the official Diamond Jubilee single. Barlow and Lord Lloyd Webber composed the music to the song; with Barlow then taking this music to musicians and singers around the Commonwealth with the aim to incorporate sounds from around the world onto the single. The song entitled "Sing" was released as the lead single from the album of the same name, Sing. It debuted in the UK Singles Chart at number 11 with the album released on the same day entering the UK Album Chart at number one, becoming Barlow's second solo number-one album and his first in 15 years. After the airing of Gary Barlow's documentary Gary Barlow: On Her Majesty's Service which told the story of how Sing was written; the single climbed up to number one in the iTunes chart. The following week Sing rose to number one in the UK Singles Chart selling 142,000 copies and becoming among the highest selling singles of 2012. The album of the same name remained at number one, making Barlow the first artist in 2012 to have the number-one album and number-one single in the same week.

Barlow announced on 15 October 2012 that he was to embark on his first full solo tour in thirteen years around the UK and Ireland.

The tickets to Barlow's solo concerts sold out "instantly" after going on sale on 19 October, with tickets selling faster than those of the Rolling Stones for their comeback dates. Demand was so high for tickets that Barlow added more dates, which also sold out instantly. It was also revealed by ticket marketplace SeatWave, that Barlow's solo shows had sold six times more tickets than Robbie Williams' solo concerts, despite being on sale for a week less.

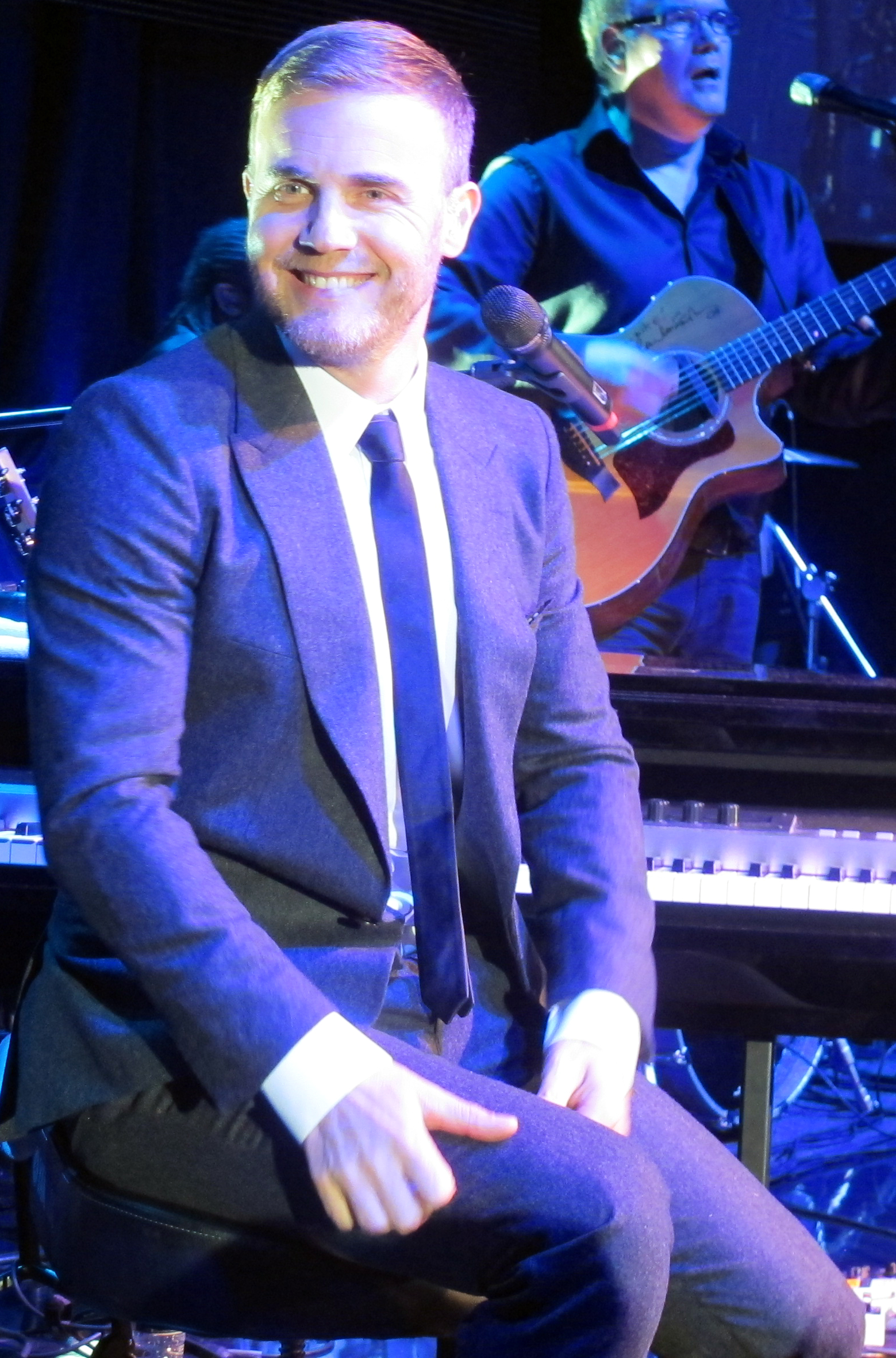
Barlow performing in concert in 2013

In September 2013, Barlow announced via his Twitter account that he would be releasing his first full-length solo album in 14 years, on 25 November 2013. On 4 October 2013, Barlow revealed his new album would be called Since I Saw You Last, and would be preceded by his first single from the LP, titled "Let Me Go", released worldwide on 17 November 2013. He also announced that he would be touring the album in April 2014, playing some of the biggest arenas in the UK.

"Let Me Go" entered the UK Singles Chart at No. 3 with 72,423 copies sold in its first week on sale, giving Barlow his 21st top 3 UK single. The following week it rose to No. 2 selling a further 60,422 copies. One month after release, "Let Me Go" was certified Silver by the BPI for selling over 200,000 copies in the UK. In early 2014, Let Me Go surpassed 400,000 sales in the UK and was certified Gold. The week after the release of Let Me Go, the album debuted at number two on the UK Albums Chart, behind One Direction's third album Midnight Memories. The album sold 116,000 copies, becoming the fastest selling album of 2013 to miss out on the top spot, whilst also selling more copies in his first week than his Take That bandmate Robbie Williams, whose album Swings Both Ways sold 109,000 copies the previous week to claim the top spot. The album was certified Platinum by the BPI less than a month after being released, becoming Barlow's second solo album to reach Platinum certification. The album went 2× Platinum a month later, spending 11 weeks in the top 5 of the UK Album Charts, becoming Barlow's most successful solo album in the UK to date.

=== 2017–present: A Better Me, Music Played by Humans, The Dream of Christmas, A Different Stage and Songbook Tour ===
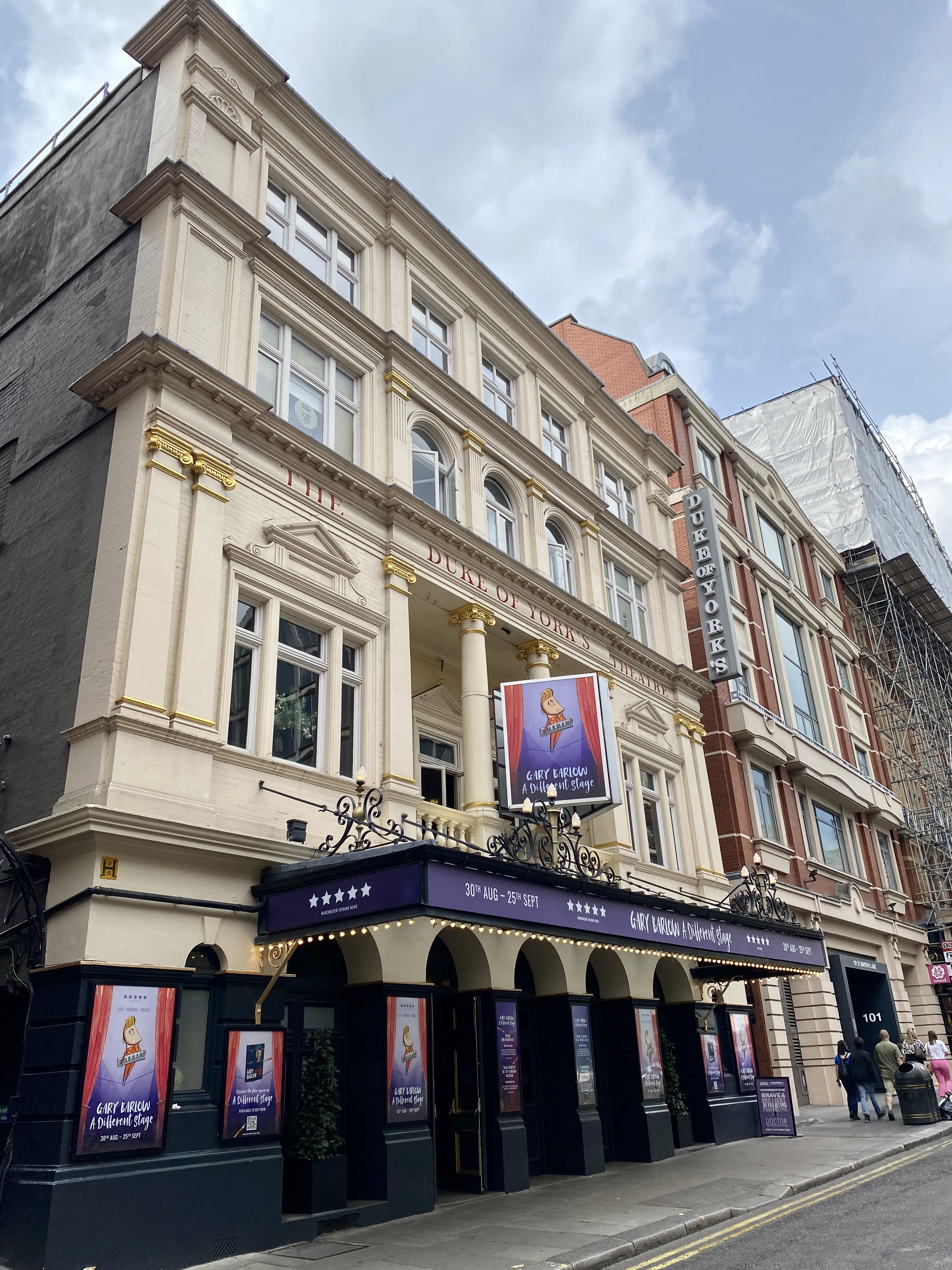
A Different Stage at the Duke of York's Theatre in August 2022

On 12 October 2017, whilst appearing on BBC Radio 2, Barlow announced that he would be embarking on a solo tour again around the UK and Ireland to celebrate the release of his new book, A Better Me. The tour was to visit smaller and more intimate venues rather than the huge arenas and stadiums that Barlow was so familiar with playing, be it solo or alongside his Take That bandmates.

On 14 August 2019, Barlow announced that he had been working on a new solo record due for release in autumn 2020, stating that "[he has] never recorded with an orchestra" and wanted to create "original songs with big contemporary orchestral arrangements." In July 2020, Barlow confirmed that the album will release in November, adding that "[the album is] very positive and [composed] with a 60-piece orchestra."

On 30 September 2020, Barlow revealed that his upcoming album would be called Music Played by Humans, set to be released on 27 November 2020. Its lead single, "Elita", featuring Michael Bublé and Sebastián Yatra, was released on the same day after it premiered on BBC Radio 2. A tour to promote the record in 2021 has also been announced with Leona Lewis as special guest.

Barlow announced in early 2021 that he would release a new solo record by the end of the year, which was revealed on 28 October to be The Dream of Christmas, his first Christmas album. The project features a collection of both new songs and covers of Christmas classics, including the two singles "Sleigh Ride" and "The Dream of Christmas", both released on 29 October. The album was released on 26 November.

On 20 January 2022, Barlow announced a brand new one-man stage show A Different Stage. The show premiered in Runcorn at The Brindley on 10 February 2022 before then touring around the UK. The show also played two runs in London's West End at the Duke of York's Theatre and Savoy Theatre.

In November 2024, Barlow announced a solo tour for 2025, returning to his roots with performances across the UK. The tour, called the Songbook Tour, will begin in April 2025 with two shows on the Isle of Man and include 41 shows in total. Key stops will include Liverpool, Blackpool, Manchester and Delamere Forest in June 2025.

On 20 March 2025, Barlow released a new single "If There's Not A Song About It" featuring Colbie Caillat which formed part of an EP titled 'Meanwhile' which was released on 29 August 2025 featuring additional songs with Becky Hill and Rosa Linn.

== Other musical projects ==
=== Songwriting, producing and publishing ===
After leaving his career as a solo artist Barlow returned to his first love of writing music. He soon signed a songwriting publishing deal with Sony and went to the US on a six-month songwriting project, residing in Nashville, Los Angeles and New York with his wife, Dawn, and first child. Upon his return, he set up True North Productions with Eliot Kennedy and Tim Woodcock. In his autobiography My Take Barlow partly blames his fall as a solo artist on his commitments to being a star in the United States. After his disappointing second album, Barlow remained out of the public eye for half a decade, choosing to continue to write and produce songs for other artists such as Shirley Bassey and Charlotte Church.

In October 2007, Barlow founded San Remo Live Publishings as an independently run management company to establish and support artists and songwriters.

In 2008, Barlow was heavily involved in providing the score of ITV's Britannia High. The 9-episode series focused on the lives of a group of teenagers and their mentors at a fictional London theatre school. Guy Chambers, Steve Mac, Andy Hill, Mark Owen, James Bourne and Eliot Kennedy also contributed to the musical component of the show. It was axed after one series.

In 2010, Barlow signed a new 5-year songwriting publishing deal with Sony Music. He has been voted as the greatest British songwriter of all time in a 2009 OnePoll, who surveyed 3,000 people John Lennon and Paul McCartney, of The Beatles, were placed second and third respectively.

In 2011, Barlow wrote the song "Run for Your Life" for The X Factor series 7 winner Matt Cardle's debut album. He has also written for the likes of Robbie Williams, Westlife, Lily Allen, Blue, Elton John, Barry Manilow, Olly Murs T-Pain, Will Young N-Dubz, Lawson, Shirley Bassey, Donny Osmond, Delta Goodrem, Elaine Paige, Agnetha Fältskog and many more while also being commissioned by the Queen to write the official single for her Diamond Jubilee, which saw Barlow collaborate with Andrew Lloyd Webber.

Barlow has written 15 number-one singles in the UK and 2 Billboard Hot 100 top-ten singles in the United States including "Back for Good" which went to number one in 31 countries around the world.

=== Ceremonial work ===
At the beginning of May 2010, it was reported that the Queen had asked Barlow to organise her 86th birthday party and her Diamond Jubilee celebrations in 2012. This was confirmed in February 2012 with Barlow being named as the organiser of the concert that took place outside Buckingham Palace and featuring a variety of famous artists. Barlow said: "The Diamond Jubilee Concert will celebrate the 60 years of the Queen's reign with an amazing line-up of world-class artists coming together to play at one of the biggest and most exciting live music shows in recent years."

On 4 June 2012, the Diamond Jubilee concert was held outside Buckingham Palace with it acting as a backdrop to a stage built upon the Victoria Memorial featuring various worldwide artists. The concert included music stemming from the 1950s to the 2000s with each decade of her reign reflected in the music performed. Barlow himself appeared alongside Andrew Lloyd Webber and his own Commonwealth Band to perform the self-written official jubilee single "Sing" while also dueting with Girls Aloud's Cheryl Cole on the night which won praise from critics who called "the performance as [two of] the best of Britain [who] proved their pop credentials with a dazzling duet."

=== Future records ===
In 2009 Barlow began work on his own record label Future Records, a branch from Universal Music and signed his first artist, classical singer Camilla Kerslake. Since then Barlow has also signed UK rapper Aggro Santos to his label who scored two top 10 UK hits and a further top 20 single, and the winner of Sky 1's Must Be The Music, Emma's Imagination who also achieved two top 10 UK singles and a top 15 charting debut album. In 2013 Barlow's discovery A*M*E released her first single which debuted at number one on the UK Singles Chart. Gary Barlow has since closed down the record label to focus on his own career and family commitments.

=== The X Factor ===
On 7 May 2011, it was announced that Barlow was in advanced talks to replace Simon Cowell as a judge on The X Factor. He was officially confirmed as a judge on 30 May, alongside returning judge Louis Walsh and fellow new judges Tulisa and Kelly Rowland, who collectively replaced Cheryl Cole and Dannii Minogue. Barlow was given the "Boys" category for the live shows and mentored Marcus Collins to the final of The X Factor, where he became runner up.

After a successful debut as a judge on The X Factor in 2011, ITV producers opened talks with Barlow to return for a second series and offered a substantial increase on his £1.5 million salary from the previous year. On 17 April 2012, it was announced that Barlow would return to The X Factor for a second year; he was the first judge to be announced to be returning. He was later joined by returning judges Walsh and Tulisa alongside new judge Nicole Scherzinger, who replaced Rowland after one series. For his second year as a mentor, he was given the Over 28s category, which featured both male and female contestants a.k.a mix gender over the age of 28. He became the only judge to have four contestants in the live shows after Christopher Maloney became the popular wildcard and the thirteenth contestant in the show. Barlow guided Maloney to the final of the show, becoming Barlow's second contestant in two consecutive years.

Barlow said on 9 December 2012 that he may not return as a judge for a third series on The X Factor, stating that he did not know "if there is room" in his diary for the programme. However, on 20 May 2013, it was confirmed by Walsh that he and Barlow would both return to continue their roles as judges on the tenth series of The X Factor, alongside Scherzinger and former judge Sharon Osbourne who replaced Tulisa. Barlow was given the Groups category in his third year on the show. Barlow chose Kingsland Road, Miss Dynamix and Rough Copy as his top three contestants. After losing two of his final contestant, he guided Rough Copy to the semi-final.

During Rough Copy's performance on the first live show of The X Factor 2013, Barlow revealed that this would be his last series as a judge on the show, due to his solo tour commitments and the upcoming release of a new Take That album. Barlow was replaced by Cowell, who returned to the show after a three-year absence.

=== Musical theatre ===
On 25 June 2013, it was announced that Barlow had been signed up to work on a new musical version of Finding Neverland and will co-write the score for the theatre project, which is being developed by Hollywood producer Harvey Weinstein. Barlow said of the project: "This is something I've always wanted to do so it's a real privilege to be involved. I'm really enjoying working with the team and I love the story; it's also great to be working with a legendary creative like Harvey Weinstein." Weinstein echoed the sentiment by expressing his admiration for Barlow, whom he described as "one of the finest songwriters in the world".

On 1 March 2014, Barlow attended Bob and Harvey Weinstein's pre-Academy Awards party at the Montage in Beverly Hills to perform a selection of songs from the musical score he had written for Finding Neverland. He played the lead role of Peter Pan author J. M. Barrie and sang a duet with British musical actress Laura Michelle Kelly along with four backup artists featured in the Oscar-nominated documentary 20 Feet from Stardom. Barlow's performance was well received, and after a successful performance run in Boston, Finding Neverland opened on Broadway in spring 2015. On its first Broadway preview, the show sold out the theatre and posted a box office performance that, if it continued for a whole week of performances, would have seen the show top $1 million.

Barlow has also co-written a musical alongside hometown friend Tim Firth, called The Girls (later retitled in 2017 as Calendar Girls The Musical), which opened at the Phoenix Theatre, London in January 2017.

=== Let It Shine ===
In the summer of 2016, Barlow launched his own talent show Let It Shine, in the search for 5 males to star in an upcoming nationwide musical using the music of Take That. The musical will tour all over the UK, with up to 8 shows a week. Let It Shine premiered on BBC One on 7 January 2017 and the first live show was premiered on 11 February 2017.

=== The Crooner Sessions ===
During the COVID-19 pandemic in 2020, Barlow received global recognition for his "The Crooner Sessions" series which featured him performing songs online alongside other artists. Although initially starting as a way to entertain his fans during the lockdown, Barlow's videos, which debuted on Instagram before later being uploaded to his YouTube Channel, Facebook and Twitter feeds, became a hotly-anticipated event for many music lovers worldwide. Describing his inspiration for the series, Barlow explained "we can't go on stages or into theaters. Maybe this is our new stage". On 5 January 2021, Barlow announced on his social media accounts that the Crooner Sessions would be returning for a second series through the 2021 UK lockdown. The first episode of the renewed series premiered on 11 January 2021.

=== Walk the Line ===
After being replaced as a judge on The X Factor by a returning Simon Cowell, Barlow ended up replacing Cowell as a judge on the panel of Syco's new talent show Walk the Line before the first episode was aired. Debuting on ITV on 12 December 2021, Barlow joined Craig David, Dawn French and Alesha Dixon on the judging panel.

== Honours ==
After twenty years within the music industry in which Barlow has achieved success around the world; coupled with his efforts to raise money and awareness for various charities he was honoured in the 2012 Queen's Birthday Honours. He was appointed an Officer of the Order of the British Empire (OBE) by the Queen on 16 June 2012, which he was awarded on 21 November for "services to the Entertainment Industry and to Charity". In a statement, Barlow said: "I'm absolutely thrilled and feel very privileged to be in the company of so many brilliant people who I know have received an OBE. My family are very proud."

In July 2012, Barlow was announced as the recipient of the Music Industry Trusts Award which he was presented with in November 2012 in recognition of his services to British music and charity. David Munns, chairman of the award committee, said of Barlow: "He is one of the UK's most accomplished artists – a unique musician, songwriter and producer who embodies both success and distinction and who serves as a dedicated ambassador for many charities."

== Outside music ==
=== Acting career ===
In 2000, Barlow made his acting debut in the ITV1 drama Heartbeat: this was the 150th edition of the show, and Barlow played hitch-hiker Micky Shannon. In the episode, Shannon performed the song "All That I've Given Away". In 2012, Barlow had a cameo in the film Keith Lemon: The Film and in early 2013 he had a cameo in the hit BBC1 show Miranda and also in a 2015 special. Barlow had a brief cameo in Star Wars: The Last Jedi as a soldier in the Crait trenches. In 2023, Barlow played a busker in the Take That movie musical Greatest Days alongside bandmates Howard Donald and Mark Owen.

=== Social media ===
In October 2011, Barlow joined Twitter live on The Xtra Factor to build support for the contestants he mentored during series 8 of The X Factor. Almost immediately after he joined Twitter his following totalled at over 300,000 people. Within two months of joining Twitter, Barlow reached over 1 million followers.

=== TV projects ===
In November 2024, Barlow released a new series Gary Barlow Wine Tours exploring food and drink in South Africa. The first series starred special guests Mica Paris, Ben Shephard, Jane McDonald and Michaela Strachan. In December 2024, the series was commissioned for a second series due to be filmed in Australia. The second series is due to air from 11 April 2025 featuring special guests Sophie Ellis-Bextor, Dannii Minogue, Tim Minchin and Ronan Keating.

=== Charity work ===
Barlow organised a sponsored climb to the top of Mount Kilimanjaro to raise money for Comic Relief. Barlow and eight other celebrities: Cheryl Cole, Ben Shephard, Alesha Dixon, Kimberley Walsh, Fearne Cotton, Chris Moyles, Denise Van Outen and Boyzone's Ronan Keating, made it to the top of Mount Kilimanjaro safely on 7 March 2009, raising millions for Comic Relief.

Barlow's charity efforts in 2009, including his organising of the BT Comic Relief Kilimanjaro Climb and his organising of Children in Need Rocks the Royal Albert Hall, raised in excess £6 million. In addition to the charity events organised by Barlow, he has also shown support for fellow artists' charity efforts including that of Boyzone's Ronan Keating. The pair sang Take That's "Back for Good" written by Barlow at Ronan's Emerald and Ivy Ball in Battersea, South London, on Saturday. The event raised £650,000 for Cancer Research UK.

His organisation of a special event at the Royal Albert Hall went ahead in November 2009 and was broadcast the following week. This saw a meeting of Take That with Robbie Williams on stage and a number of unusual duets (including Dame Shirley Bassey with Dizzee Rascal and Take That with Lily Allen). Barlow dedicated the band's song "Rule the World" to "everyone who's lost someone – Dad, this is for you".

It was announced in December 2009 that Barlow had been awarded the prestigious Blue Peter Gold Badge, awarded for outstanding achievements and inspiring children to realise their talents and achieve.

In February 2010, a project named 'Helping Haiti' was formed by Simon Cowell in response to the 2010 Haiti earthquake. The aim was to bring some of the most recognised music stars around the world together to record a charity single with all proceeds going to the cause. Barlow, along with an array of stars were asked to appear on the cover of "Everybody Hurts" which sold 453,000 copies in its first week, making it the fastest-selling charity record of the 21st century in Britain. Barlow appeared at Twickenham Stadium to perform the hit single "Shame" alongside Robbie Williams in aid of the Help for Heroes charity on 12 September 2010.

Barlow has also donated the original handwritten lyrics to his number-one hit single "Back for Good" to help raise money for the Teenage Cancer Trust. The lyrics were sold for £1,200. Barlow wrote the song in 1995 and it went on to top the charts in 31 countries around the world as well as becoming a top ten hit in America.

In January 2011, Barlow held a special show, named GB40, at Shepherd's Bush Empire to celebrate his 40th birthday. This event saw him take to the stage on his own for the first time in over eleven years as he performed songs that span his 20-year career in music. He has also announced that all of the profits from the show went to charity.

As well as organising the Children in Need Rocks Manchester concert, Barlow announced he was to helm the official single for the charity, a cover of Massive Attack's 'Teardrop' accompanied by a number of artists known as 'The Collective'. The CIN Rocks concert, single and gala contributed to £26 million raised for Children in Need that year.

During the week of Children in Need 2011, Barlow organised a celebrity gala with all proceeds going to the charities associated with Children in Need.

Barlow also donated all proceeds from his Gary Barlow: In Concert event to the Prince's Trust charity. He said: "I hope the money raised through these concerts will make a real difference to young lives. It's really important to me that disadvantaged young people get the support they need, especially at the moment."

In August 2013, the headline act to turn on the Blackpool illuminations pulled out due to unforeseen circumstances leaving the event with no one to turn on the lights or play to the 5,000 in attendance. Upon hearing this, Barlow tweeted that he would step in if the organisers would write a cheque to Children In Need. Bosses quickly made contact with him and made a donation to the charity, with Barlow turning on the lights and performing a number of his hits during the 45-minute set.

In October 2013, Barlow travelled directly from the X Factor live results shows to Afghanistan to meet the Armed Forces and experience their day-to-day lives in Camp Bastion. Barlow listened to the soldiers' stories, went for a five-kilometre run with the troops and played a morale-boosting concert for them as a thank-you for their work.

On 12 November 2013, Barlow sang with Agnetha Fältskog (from ABBA) who was singing live on stage. It was at the BBC Children in Need Rocks 2013 concert in London which Barlow organised.

In November 2016, Barlow became a Patron for Child Bereavement.

=== Gary Barlow Wine ===
In October 2021, Barlow launched his own wine brand, Gary Barlow Organic, in partnership with the London-based distributor Benchmark Drinks, The initial range had two bottlings, a red and a white, both made in Spain. It went on sale in around 460 Morrisons store. A rosé was later added to the range. In 2023, the brand launched an organic Sauvignon Blanc and a Blush wine at an event in Harvey Nichols in Manchester.

== Personal life ==
=== Family ===
In 2000, Barlow married Dawn Andrews, who was a dancer on Take That's 1995 Nobody Else Tour. They have three children, born in 2000, 2002, and 2009. On 4 August 2012, he revealed that their daughter, Poppy, was stillborn. He released a short statement reading, "Dawn and I are devastated to announce that we've lost our baby. Our focus now is giving [Poppy] a beautiful funeral and loving our three children with all our hearts. We'd ask at this painful time that our privacy be respected." Later in 2022 he said: "I needed to accept this wasn't a scar that was going to heal with time, this was a scar I was going to die with".

Despite the loss of his daughter one week previously, Barlow performed at the London 2012 Olympic Games Closing Ceremony singing the hit "Rule the World", which drew praise internationally for the strength and determination of Barlow to take to the stage so soon after his tragedy. Owing to the bereavement, it was announced that Barlow would not attend the X Factor press launch.

In his autobiography My Take, Barlow revealed that he is a supporter of Liverpool F.C., with their anthem being one of the first songs he learned to play on the piano. He is also a supporter of the Warrington Wolves and the New York Knicks.

In 2009, Barlow named "Don't Give Up", the 1986 duet between Peter Gabriel and Kate Bush, as the song that had most inspired him. He said, "I don't think you can listen to this song without feeling inspired, it could save anybody. The lyrics are so inspirational. Specifically I was having a very low moment in the 1990s and the song came on the radio. There have only been a very few times when I've had to pull the car over to listen to a song; this was one of them."

=== Politics ===
During the 2010 general election campaign, the Conservative Party announced their intention to encourage musical achievement among young people in schools with a competition called "School Stars". Barlow appeared at a school-staged campaign event to endorse the introduction of the programme by the then Conservative leader David Cameron. Barlow also sang "Greatest Day" at the event. When asked if he was supporting the Conservatives at the election, Barlow responded: "I would not be here if I was not."

=== Tax avoidance controversy ===
In June 2012, it was revealed that along with Take That bandmates Howard Donald and Mark Owen (and over 1,100 other people), Barlow had invested £26 million in music industry investment schemes. The news attracted controversy when it was understood that the schemes could serve as tax shelters for wealthy people. Barlow was accused of tax avoidance rather than tax evasion, as the scheme itself was not illegal at the time Barlow invested in it. Barlow's lawyer responded to the claims, stating that the singer "paid significant tax, and that they believed the schemes were not for tax avoidance purposes but were legitimate commercial enterprises". In May 2014 a judge ruled that the scheme was set up for the purpose of avoiding tax, with the scheme generating losses of £336 million to enable Barlow and others to offset those losses against taxes they were liable to pay from other earnings. In June 2016, Barlow (and Donald and Owen plus their manager Jonathon Wild) announced they would not appeal against a ruling that they are liable to re-pay the tax. Barlow apologised on Twitter "to anyone who was offended by the tax stories".

== Discography ==
=== Studio albums as a solo artist ===
- Open Road (1997)
- Twelve Months, Eleven Days (1999)
- Sing (2012)
- Since I Saw You Last (2013)
- Music Played by Humans (2020)
- The Dream of Christmas (2021)

=== EPs as a solo artist ===
- Meanwhile (2025)

=== Studio albums with Take That ===
- Take That & Party (1992)
- Everything Changes (1993)
- Nobody Else (1995)
- Beautiful World (2006)
- The Circus (2008)
- Progress (2010)
- III (2014)
- Wonderland (2017)
- This Life (2023)
- Dreamers (2026)

=== EPs with Take That ===
- Progressed (2011)

== Tours ==
=== Solo ===
- The Open Road Tour (1998–99)
- For the Fans Tour (1999)
- GB40 (2011)
- Gary Barlow: in Concert (2011–13)
- Since I Saw You Last Tour (2014)
- Gary Barlow: in Concert (2018)
- All the Hits Live (2021)
- A Different Stage (2022)
- The Songbook Tour (2025)

=== Take That ===
- Party Tour (1992–93)
- Everything Changes Tour (1993–94)
- Pops Tour (1994–95)
- Nobody Else Tour (1995)
- The Ultimate Tour (2006)
- Beautiful World Tour 2007 (2007)
- Take That Present: The Circus Live (2009)
- Progress Live (2011)
- Take That Live (2015)
- Wonderland Live (2017)
- Greatest Hits Live (2019)
- This Life on Tour (2024)
- The Circus Live – Summer 2026 (2026)
- Dreamers Tour (2027)

== Awards and nominations ==
Year	Nominee / work	Award	Result
2023	A Different Stage	WhatsOnStage Award for Best New Play	Nominated
2014	Since I Saw You Last	Celebritain UK for Album of the Year	Nominated
2014	Let Me Go	Celebritain UK for Best Single	Nominated
2013	Let Me Go	Heart for Best Single of 2013	Won
2013	Gary Barlow Live	Nordoff-Robbins Award for Best Live Act 2013	Nominated
2012	Gary Barlow	GQ Award for Outstanding Achievement	Won
2012	Gary Barlow	Music Industry Trusts Award Honorary Recognition for Barlow's contribution to music over the past two decades.	Won
2012	Gary Barlow	National Reality Television Award for Best Reality TV Judge	Nominated
2012	Gary Barlow	OBE for services to Entertainment Industry and Charity.	Won
2012	Take That	Ivor Novello Award for Outstanding Contribution to British Music	Won
2012	The Flood	Ivor Novello Award for PRS Most Performed Work	Nominated
2012	Gary Barlow	National Television Award for Outstanding Contribution to Charity	Won
2012	X Factor	National Television Award for Best Television Talent Show	Won
2011	Gary Barlow	Q Award for Classic Songwriter	Won
2011	Shame	Q Award for Best Collaboration	Won
2011	Shame	Virgin Media for Music Video	Nominated
2011	Shame	Virgin Media for Best Collaboration	Nominated
2010	Gary Barlow	Blue Peter Gold Badge	Won
2008	Shine	Ivor Novello Award for Most Performed Song	Won
2007	Gary Barlow	GQ Awards for Man of the Year	Won
1998	Gary Barlow	Brit Award for Best British Male	Nominated
1998	Open Road	The London Awards for Best Album	Nominated
1998	Love Won't Wait	Top of the Pops for Best Single	Nominated
1997	Forever Love	FMQ Awards [Finland] for Best Single	Won
1997	Forever Love	TMF Awards [Netherlands] for Best Single	Nominated
1997	Open Road	GQ Awards for Best Album	Nominated
1997	Forever Love	Echo Awards for Best Single	Nominated
1996	Never Forget	Ivor Novello Award	Won
1996	Back for Good	Billboard International Hit of the Year	Won
1995	Back for Good	Ivor Novello Award for the Song of the year	Won
1994	Pray	Ivor Novello Award for Best Contemporary Song	Won
1993	Gary Barlow	Ivor Novello Award for Songwriter of The Year Award 1993	Won

== Books ==
- Gary Barlow: My Take. Bloomsbury UK 2006, ISBN 0-7475-8764-7.
- Gary Barlow: My Take. Bloomsbury Press 2007, ISBN 978-0-7475-8806-1 (paperback edition, updated to include Take That's comeback).
- Gary Barlow: A Better Me: The Official Autobiography. Blink Publishing 2018, ISBN 978-1-911600-97-8.

== Sources ==
- Smith, Sean (26 September 2013). Gary The Definite Biography of Gary Barlow. Simon & Schuster. ISBN 978-1-4711-0224-0.
