= List of songs recorded by Take That =

This is a list of commercially released songs by the English boy band Take That, details of remixes and 'concert only' tracks can be found later in the article. There are currently 157 Take That songs that have been commercially released as studio recordings, including 16 from their latest album This Life All are listed below.

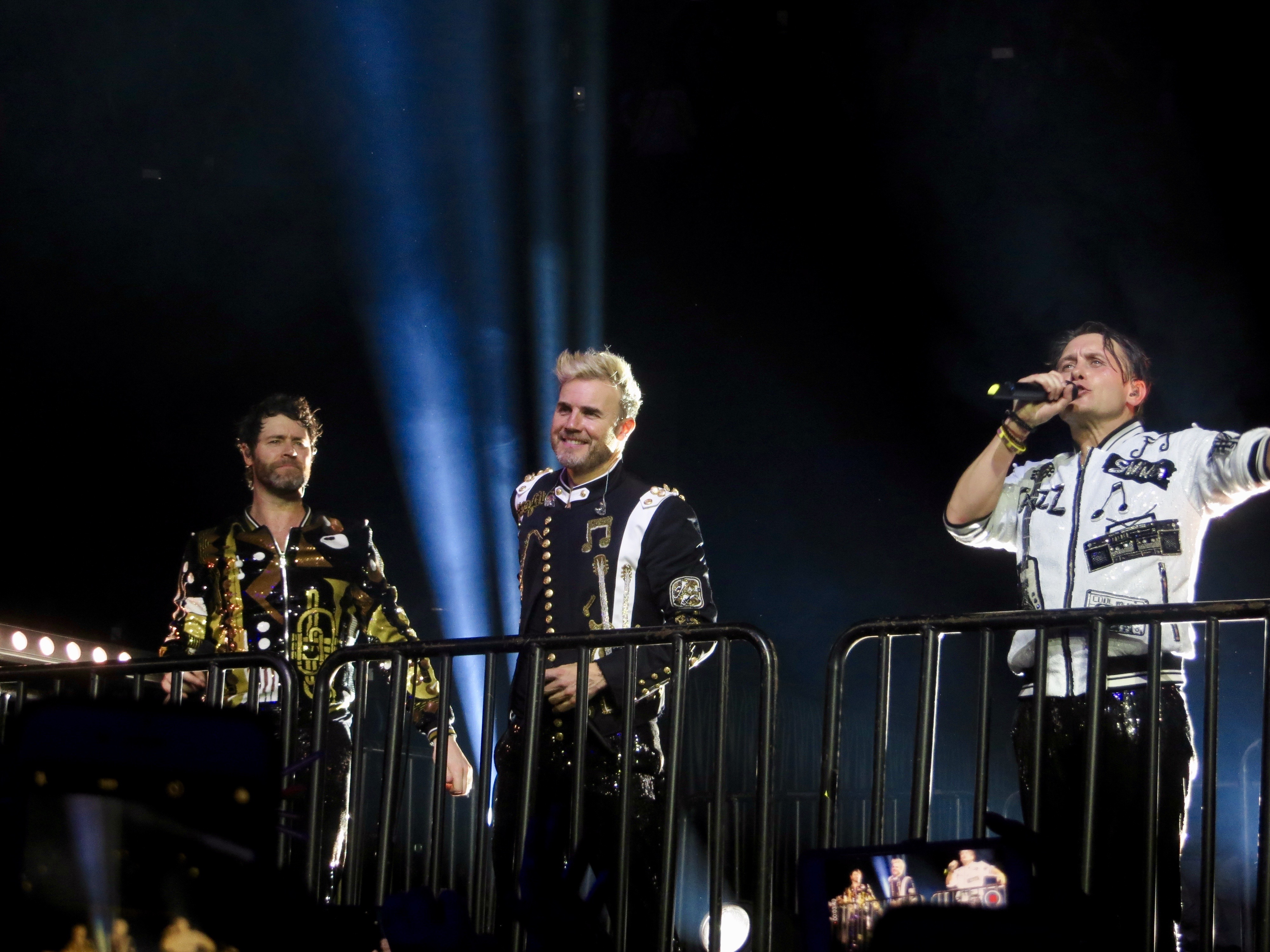
Take That are a multi-award-winning British Pop band

== Songs ==
Song title	Album	Written by	Lead singer	Band lineup	References
6 in the Morning Fool	Beautiful World (Japanese edition bonus track)	Take That	Gary Barlow	Barlow, Donald, Orange, Owen	
84	Up All Night; The Garden	Take That	Jason Orange, Mark Owen	Barlow, Donald, Orange, Owen	
A Million Love Songs	Take That & Party; Greatest Hits; The Best of Take That; Forever... Greatest Hits; Never Forget – The Ultimate Collection; The Platinum Collection; A Million Love Songs; Back for Good	Gary Barlow	Gary Barlow	Barlow, Donald, Orange, Owen, Williams	
Affirmation	Progress	Take That	Howard Donald	Barlow, Donald, Orange, Owen, Williams	
Ain't No Sense in Love	Beautiful World	Take That	Gary Barlow	Barlow, Donald, Orange, Owen	
Aliens	Progressed	Take That	Howard Donald, Mark Owen	Barlow, Donald, Orange, Owen, Williams	
All I Want Is You	Everything Changes; Forever... Greatest Hits; The Platinum Collection; Babe	Gary Barlow	Gary Barlow	Barlow, Donald, Orange, Owen, Williams	
All That Matters to Me	Nobody Else (Japanese edition bonus track); Forever... Greatest Hits; Nobody Else (30th Anniversary Edition)	Gary Barlow	Gary Barlow	Barlow, Donald, Orange, Owen, Williams	
All Wrapped Up	All Wrapped Up; This Life (Deluxe)	Gary Barlow, Mark Owen, Howard Donald	Mark Owen	Barlow, Donald, Owen	
Amazing	III	Gary Barlow, Howard Donald, Mark Owen	Gary Barlow	Barlow, Donald, Owen	
And The Band Plays	Wonderland	Barlow, Donald, Owen	Gary Barlow	Barlow, Donald, Owen	
Another Crack in My Heart	Everything Changes; The Platinum Collection	Gary Barlow	Gary Barlow	Barlow, Donald, Orange, Owen, Williams	
Babe	Everything Changes; Greatest Hits; The Best of Take That; Forever... Greatest Hits; Never Forget – The Ultimate Collection; The Platinum Collection; Babe	Gary Barlow	Mark Owen	Barlow, Donald, Orange, Owen, Williams	
Back for Good	Nobody Else; Greatest Hits; The Best of Take That; Forever... Greatest Hits; Never Forget – The Ultimate Collection; The Platinum Collection; Back for Good	Gary Barlow	Gary Barlow	Barlow, Donald, Orange, Owen, Williams	
Beatles Medley	Forever... Greatest Hits; Everything Changes (Single)	Original medley of covers of songs by The Beatles. The songs included, in order, are "I Want to Hold Your Hand", "A Hard Day's Night" and "She Loves You"	Gary Barlow, Robbie Williams	Barlow, Donald, Orange, Owen, Williams	
Beautiful	Progressed	Take That	Gary Barlow	Barlow, Donald, Orange, Owen, Williams	
Beautiful Morning	Beautiful World (tour edition bonus track); Patience	Gary Barlow	Gary Barlow	Barlow, Donald, Orange, Owen	
Beautiful World	Beautiful World	Gary Barlow	Howard Donald	Barlow, Donald, Orange, Owen	
Believe	III	Gary Barlow, Mark Owen, Howard Donald, Jamie Norton, Ben Mark	Mark Owen	Barlow, Donald, Owen	
Bird In Your Hand	III (2015 edition bonus track)	Gary Barlow, Mark Owen, Howard Donald, Jamie Norton, Ben Mark, Michael C. Corson	Mark Owen	Barlow, Donald, Owen	
Brand New Sun	This Life; Brand New Sun	Gary Barlow, Mark Owen, Howard Donald, Jamie Norton, Ben Mark	Mark Owen	Barlow, Donald, Owen	
Broken Your Heart	Everything Changes; Forever... Greatest Hits; The Platinum Collection	Gary Barlow	Gary Barlow	Barlow, Donald, Orange, Owen, Williams	
Butterfly	Beautiful World (hidden track); Beautiful World (tour edition bonus track)	Gary Barlow	Gary Barlow	Barlow, Donald, Orange, Owen	
Carry Me Home	III (2015 edition bonus track)	Gary Barlow, Mark Owen, Howard Donald, Ben Mark, Mark Taylor, Paul Barry	Gary Barlow	Barlow, Donald, Owen	
Come On Love	Wonderland	Barlow, Donald, Owen	Gary Barlow	Barlow, Donald, Owen	
Could It Be Magic	Take That & Party; Greatest Hits; The Best of Take That; Forever... Greatest Hits; Never Forget – The Ultimate Collection; The Platinum Collection; Could It Be Magic	Originally written by Barry Manilow and Adrienne Anderson; covered by Take That in 1992	Robbie Williams	Barlow, Donald, Orange, Owen, Williams	
Cry (Sigma featuring Take That)	Cry (Sigma single); Wonderland; TBC (Sigma album)	Dominic Liu, Sean McDonagh, Matt Furmidge, Chiara Hunter, Barlow, Owen, Donald	Gary Barlow	Barlow, Donald, Cameron Edwards, Joe Lenzie, Owen	
Days I Hate Myself	This Life	Gary Barlow, Howard Donald, Mark Owen	Gary Barlow	Barlow, Donald, Owen	
Do What U Like	Take That & Party; Greatest Hits; The Best of Take That; Forever... Greatest Hits; The Platinum Collection; Do What U Like; Promises	Gary Barlow, Ray Hedges	Gary Barlow	Barlow, Donald, Orange, Owen, Williams	
Do It All for Love	III	Gary Barlow, Howard Donald, Mark Owen	Mark Owen	Barlow, Donald, Owen	
Don't Give Up On Me	Wonderland	Barlow, Donald, Owen	Gary Barlow	Barlow, Donald, Owen	
Don't Say Goodbye	Progressed	Take That	Gary Barlow	Barlow, Donald, Orange, Owen, Williams	
Don't Take Your Love	Forever... Greatest Hits; A Million Love Songs	Gary Barlow	Gary Barlow	Barlow, Donald, Orange, Owen, Williams	
Eight Letters	Progress	Take That	Gary Barlow	Barlow, Donald, Orange, Owen, Williams	
Everlasting	Odyssey	Gary Barlow, Howard Donald, Mark Owen, Rick Parkhouse, George Tizzard	Mark Owen	Barlow, Donald, Owen	
Every Guy	Nobody Else; Forever... Greatest Hits; The Platinum Collection	Gary Barlow	Gary Barlow, Robbie Williams	Barlow, Donald, Orange, Owen, Williams	
Every Revolution	Wonderland	Barlow, Donald, Owen, Jamie Norton, Ben Mark	Howard Donald	Barlow, Donald, Owen	
Everything Changes	Everything Changes; Greatest Hits; The Best of Take That; Forever... Greatest Hits; Never Forget – The Ultimate Collection; The Platinum Collection; Everything Changes (Single)	Gary Barlow, Michael Ward, Eliot Kennedy and Cary Bayliss	Robbie Williams	Barlow, Donald, Orange, Owen, Williams	
Fall Down at Your Feet	III	TBC	Gary Barlow	Barlow, Donald, Owen	
Flaws	III	Gary Barlow, Mark Owen, Howard Donald	Gary Barlow	Barlow, Donald, Owen	
Flowerbed	Progress (hidden track)	Take That	Jason Orange	Barlow, Donald, Orange, Owen, Williams	
Freeze	III	Gary Barlow, Mark Owen, Howard Donald	Gary Barlow	Barlow, Donald, Owen	
Get Ready for It	III	Gary Barlow, Howard Donald, Mark Owen, Steve Robson	Gary Barlow	Barlow, Donald, Owen	
Giants	Giants; Wonderland	Barlow, Donald, Owen, Jamie Norton, Ben Mark	Gary Barlow	Barlow, Donald, Owen	
Give Good Feeling	Take That & Party; The Platinum Collection	Gary Barlow	Gary Barlow	Barlow, Donald, Orange, Owen, Williams	
Give You My Love	III	Gary Barlow, Mark Owen, Howard Donald	Howard Donald	Barlow, Donald, Owen	
Greatest Day	The Circus; Greatest Day	Take That	Gary Barlow	Barlow, Donald, Orange, Owen	
Hanging Onto Your Love	Nobody Else; The Platinum Collection	Gary Barlow, David Morales	Gary Barlow	Barlow, Donald, Orange, Owen, Williams	
Happy Now	Progress; Happy Now	Take That	Gary Barlow, Robbie Williams	Barlow, Donald, Orange, Owen, Williams	
Hate It	Nobody Else; The Platinum Collection	Gary Barlow	Gary Barlow	Barlow, Donald, Orange, Owen, Williams	
Hello	The Circus	Gary Barlow, Steve Robson, Howard Donald, Jason Orange, Mark Owen	Mark Owen	Barlow, Donald, Orange, Owen	
Here	The Circus; Greatest Day	Take That, Olly Knights, Gail Paridjanian,	Howard Donald	Barlow, Donald, Orange, Owen	
Hey Boy	Hey Boy; III (2015 edition bonus track)	Gary Barlow, Mark Owen, Howard Donald, Jamie Norton, Ben Mark	Mark Owen, Gary Barlow	Barlow, Donald, Owen	
Higher Than Higher	III; Higher Than Higher	Mattias Larsson, Robin Fredriksson, Joe Janiak, Gary Barlow, Mark Owen, Howard Donald	Gary Barlow	Barlow, Donald, Owen	
Hold On	Beautiful World	Take That, John Shanks	Mark Owen	Barlow, Donald, Orange, Owen	
Hold Up a Light	The Circus; Hold Up a Light (Single)	Take That, Ben Mark, Jamie Norton	Mark Owen	Barlow, Donald, Orange, Owen	
Holding Back the Tears	Nobody Else; The Platinum Collection	Gary Barlow	Gary Barlow	Barlow, Donald, Orange, Owen, Williams	
Hope	Wonderland	Barlow, Donald, Owen, Tom Baxter	Gary Barlow	Barlow, Donald, Owen	
How Can It Be	Take That & Party; Forever... Greatest Hits; The Platinum Collection; A Million Love Songs	Gary Barlow	Gary Barlow, Mark Owen	Barlow, Donald, Orange, Owen, Williams	
How Deep Is Your Love	Greatest Hits; The Best of Take That; Forever... Greatest Hits; Never Forget – The Ultimate Collection; How Deep Is Your Love	Originally Written by the Bee Gees; covered by Take That in 1996	Gary Barlow	Barlow, Donald, Orange, Owen	
How Did It Come to This	The Circus	Take That, Ben Mark, Jamie Norton	Jason Orange	Barlow, Donald, Orange, Owen	
I'd Wait for Life	Beautiful World; I'd Wait for Life	Take That	Gary Barlow	Barlow, Donald, Orange, Owen	
It's All For You	Wonderland	Barlow, Donald, Owen	Gary Barlow	Barlow, Donald, Owen	
I'm Out	I Found Heaven	Gary Barlow, Billy Griffin, Ian Levine	Gary Barlow	Barlow, Donald, Orange, Owen, Williams	
I Can Make It	Take That & Party; The Platinum Collection; It Only Takes a Minute	Gary Barlow	Gary Barlow	Barlow, Donald, Orange, Owen, Williams	
I Found Heaven	Take That & Party; Greatest Hits; The Best of Take That; Forever... Greatest Hits; Never Forget – The Ultimate Collection; The Platinum Collection; I Found Heaven	Billy Griffin, Ian Levine	Robbie Williams, Gary Barlow	Barlow, Donald, Orange, Owen, Williams	
I Like It	III	Gary Barlow, Howard Donald, Mark Owen	Gary Barlow, Howard Donald	Barlow, Donald, Owen	
If It's Not Love	III	TBC	Gary Barlow	Barlow, Donald, Owen	
If This Is Love	Everything Changes; The Platinum Collection	Howard Donald, Dave James	Howard Donald	Barlow, Donald, Orange, Owen, Williams	
If You Want It	III	Gary Barlow, Mark Owen, Howard Donald, Greg Kurstin	Gary Barlow	Barlow, Donald, Owen	
Into the Wild	III	Gary Barlow, Howard Donald, Mark Owen, Gary Go, John Martin	Mark Owen	Barlow, Donald, Owen	
It Only Takes a Minute	Take That & Party; Greatest Hits; The Best of Take That; Forever... Greatest Hits; Never Forget – The Ultimate Collection; The Platinum Collection; It Only Takes a Minute	Cover of a song by Tavares	Gary Barlow	Barlow, Donald, Orange, Owen, Williams	
Julie	The Circus	Take That, Steve Robson	Mark Owen	Barlow, Donald, Orange, Owen	
Keep Your Head Up	This Life	Take That	Gary Barlow, Mark Owen, Howard Donald	Barlow, Donald, Owen	
Kidz	Progress; Kidz	Take That	Mark Owen, Gary Barlow	Barlow, Donald, Orange, Owen, Williams	
Lady Tonight	Nobody Else; The Platinum Collection	Gary Barlow	Robbie Williams, Gary Barlow	Barlow, Donald, Orange, Owen, Williams	
The Last Poet	Wonderland	Barlow, Donald, Owen	Gary Barlow	Barlow, Donald, Owen	
Let in the Sun	III; Let in the Sun	Gary Barlow, Mark Owen, Howard Donald, Edvard Forre Erfjord, Gary Go, Cass Lowe, Henrik Barman Michelsen	Gary Barlow	Barlow, Donald, Owen	
Like I Never Loved You at All	Beautiful World	Take That, John Shanks	Gary Barlow	Barlow, Donald, Orange, Owen	
Love Ain't Here Anymore	Everything Changes; Greatest Hits; The Best of Take That; Forever... Greatest Hits; Never Forget – The Ultimate Collection; The Platinum Collection; Love Ain't Here Anymore	Gary Barlow	Gary Barlow	Barlow, Donald, Orange, Owen, Williams	
Love Love	Progressed; Love Love	Take That	Gary Barlow, Mark Owen	Barlow, Donald, Orange, Owen, Williams	
Loving Or Leaving	Giants	Barlow, Owen, Donald	Gary Barlow	Barlow, Donald, Owen	
Lovelife	III	Gary Barlow, Mark Owen, Howard Donald, Jamie Norton, Ben Mark	Mark Owen	Barlow, Donald, Owen	
Lucky Stars	Wonderland	Barlow, Donald, Owen, Simon Strömstedt, Noel Svahn	Gary Barlow, Howard Donald, Mark Owen	Barlow, Donald, Owen	
Man	Progressed	Take That	Gary Barlow, Mark Owen	Barlow, Donald, Orange, Owen, Williams	
Mancunian Way	Beautiful World	Take That, Eg White	Howard Donald	Barlow, Donald, Orange, Owen	
March of the Hopeful	This Life	Gary Barlow, Mark Owen, Howard Donald, Ben Mark, Jamie Norton	Howard Donald	Barlow, Donald, Owen	
Meaning of Love	Everything Changes; Forever... Greatest Hits; The Platinum Collection	Gary Barlow	Gary Barlow	Barlow, Donald, Orange, Owen, Williams	
Mind Full of Madness	This Life	Gary Barlow, Mark Owen, Howard Donald	Gary Barlow, Mark Owen, Howard Donald	Barlow, Donald, Owen	
Never Forget	Nobody Else; Greatest Hits; The Best of Take That; Forever... Greatest Hits; Never Forget – The Ultimate Collection; The Platinum Collection; Never Forget	Gary Barlow	Howard Donald	Barlow, Donald, Orange, Owen, Williams	
Never Want to Let You Go	Take That & Party; The Platinum Collection; It Only Takes a Minute	Gary Barlow	Gary Barlow	Barlow, Donald, Orange, Owen, Williams	
New Day	Wonderland; New Day	Gary Barlow, Mark Owen, Howard Donald, Simon Strömstedt	Gary Barlow, Mark Owen, Howard Donald	Barlow, Donald, Owen	
No Si Aqui No Hay Amor	Everything Changes; Forever... Greatest Hits; The Platinum Collection; Love Ain't Here Anymore; Sure	Gary Barlow	Gary Barlow	Barlow, Donald, Orange, Owen, Williams	
Nobody Else	Nobody Else; The Platinum Collection	Gary Barlow	Gary Barlow	Barlow, Donald, Orange, Owen, Williams	
Once You've Tasted Love	Take That & Party; Greatest Hits; The Best of Take That; Forever... Greatest Hits; Never Forget – The Ultimate Collection; The Platinum Collection; Once You've Tasted Love	Gary Barlow	Gary Barlow	Barlow, Donald, Orange, Owen, Williams	
One More Word	This Life	Gary Barlow, Mark Owen, Howard Donald, Ben Mark, Jamie Norton	Howard Donald	Barlow, Donald, Owen	
Out of Our Heads	Odyssey; Out of Our Heads	Gary Barlow, Mark Owen, Howard Donald	Gary Barlow	Barlow, Donald, Owen	
Patience	Beautiful World; Patience	Take That, John Shanks	Gary Barlow	Barlow, Donald, Orange, Owen	
Portrait	III	Gary Barlow, Mark Owen, Howard Donald	Gary Barlow	Barlow, Donald, Owen	
Pray	Everything Changes; Greatest Hits; The Best of Take That; Forever... Greatest Hits; Never Forget – The Ultimate Collection; The Platinum Collection; Pray; Back for Good	Gary Barlow	Gary Barlow	Barlow, Donald, Orange, Owen, Williams	
Pretty Things	Progress	Take That	Robbie Williams, Gary Barlow	Barlow, Donald, Orange, Owen, Williams	
Promises	Take That & Party; Greatest Hits; The Best of Take That; Forever... Greatest Hits; Never Forget – The Ultimate Collection; The Platinum Collection; Promises; I Found Heaven	Gary Barlow, Graham Stack	Gary Barlow	Barlow, Donald, Orange, Owen, Williams	
Reach Out	Beautiful World; Reach Out	John Shanks, Take That	Gary Barlow	Barlow, Donald, Orange, Owen	
Relight My Fire (featuring Lulu)	Everything Changes; Greatest Hits; The Best of Take That; Forever... Greatest Hits; Never Forget – The Ultimate Collection; The Platinum Collection; Relight My Fire	Cover of a song by Dan Hartman	Gary Barlow, Lulu	Barlow, Donald, Orange, Owen, Williams, Lulu	
River	Wonderland	Gary Barlow, Mark Owen, Howard Donald, Jamie Norton, Ben Mark	Mark Owen	Barlow, Donald, Owen	
Rocket Ship	Kidz	Gary Barlow, Robbie Williams, Mark Owen, Howard Donald, Jason Orange	Gary Barlow	Barlow, Donald, Orange, Owen, Williams	
Rule the World	Rule the World (NB: The single version of the track is the radio edit); Beautiful World (tour edition bonus track)	Gary Barlow, Mark Owen, Howard Donald, Jason Orange	Gary Barlow	Barlow, Donald, Orange, Owen	
Said It All	The Circus; Said It All	Gary Barlow, Mark Owen, Howard Donald, Jason Orange, Steve Robson	Gary Barlow, Mark Owen	Barlow, Donald, Orange, Owen	
Satisfied	Take That & Party; The Platinum Collection; It Only Takes a Minute	Gary Barlow	Gary Barlow	Barlow, Donald, Orange, Owen, Williams	
Serenity	This Life (Deluxe)	Gary Barlow, Mark Owen, Howard Donald, Tim Woodcock	Gary Barlow	Barlow, Donald, Owen	
She Said	The Circus (hidden track)	Gary Barlow, Mark Owen, Howard Donald, Jason Orange, Ben Mark, Jamie Norton	Gary Barlow	Barlow, Donald, Orange, Owen	
Shine	Beautiful World; Shine	Gary Barlow, Mark Owen, Howard Donald, Jason Orange, Steve Robson	Mark Owen	Barlow, Donald, Orange, Owen	
Sleepwalking	The Circus (Japanese edition bonus track); Greatest Day	Gary Barlow, Mark Owen, Howard Donald, Jason Orange	Gary Barlow	Barlow, Donald, Orange, Owen	
SOS	Progress	Gary Barlow, Robbie Williams, Mark Owen, Howard Donald, Jason Orange	Mark Owen, Robbie Williams	Barlow, Donald, Orange, Owen, Williams	
Spin	Odyssey	Gary Barlow, Howard Donald, Mark Owen, Jamie Norton, Ben Mark	Howard Donald	Barlow, Donald, Owen	
Stay Together	Rule the World	Gary Barlow, Mark Owen, Howard Donald, Jason Orange, John Shanks	Mark Owen	Barlow, Donald, Orange, Owen	
Still Can't Get Over You	Forever... Greatest Hits; A Million Love Songs	Gary Barlow	Gary Barlow	Barlow, Donald, Orange, Owen, Williams	
Sunday to Saturday	Nobody Else; Greatest Hits (Japanese edition bonus track); Forever... Greatest Hits; The Platinum Collection; Never Forget	Gary Barlow, Howard Donald, Mark Owen	Gary Barlow	Barlow, Donald, Orange, Owen, Williams	
Superstar	Wonderland	Gary Barlow, Mark Owen, Howard Donald	Mark Owen	Barlow, Donald, Owen	
Sure	Nobody Else; Greatest Hits; The Best of Take That; Forever... Greatest Hits; Never Forget – The Ultimate Collection; The Platinum Collection; Sure	Gary Barlow, Robbie Williams, Mark Owen	Gary Barlow	Barlow, Donald, Orange, Owen, Williams	
Sweet July	Sweet July	Gary Barlow, Mark Owen, Howard Donald, Noah Conrad, Bill Maybury, Mike Needle, Matt Radosevich	Gary Barlow	Barlow, Donald, Owen	
Take That and Party	Take That & Party; Forever... Greatest Hits; The Platinum Collection	Ray Hedges, Gary Barlow	Gary Barlow	Barlow, Donald, Orange, Owen, Williams	
The Champion	This Life	Gary Barlow, Mark Owen, Howard Donald, Ben Mark, Jamie Norton	Mark Owen	Barlow, Donald, Owen	
The Circus	The Circus	Gary Barlow, Mark Owen, Howard Donald, Jason Orange	Gary Barlow	Barlow, Donald, Orange, Owen	
The Day After Tomorrow	Nobody Else; Forever... Greatest Hits; The Platinum Collection	Gary Barlow	Mark Owen	Barlow, Donald, Orange, Owen, Williams	
The Day the Work Is Done	Progressed	Gary Barlow, Robbie Williams, Mark Owen, Howard Donald, Jason Orange	Mark Owen, Gary Barlow	Barlow, Donald, Orange, Owen, Williams	
The Flood	Progress; The Flood	Gary Barlow, Robbie Williams, Mark Owen, Howard Donald, Jason Orange	Robbie Williams, Gary Barlow	Barlow, Donald, Orange, Owen, Williams	
The Garden	The Circus; The Garden	Gary Barlow, Mark Owen, Howard Donald, Jason Orange	Mark Owen, Gary Barlow, Jason Orange, Howard Donald	Barlow, Donald, Orange, Owen	
The Man I Am	This Life (Deluxe)	Gary Barlow, Mark Owen, Howard Donald, Ben Mark, Jamie Norton	Howard Donald	Barlow, Donald, Owen	
These Days	III; These Days	Gary Barlow, Mark Owen, Howard Donald, Jamie Norton, Ben Mark	Gary Barlow, Mark Owen, Howard Donald	Barlow, Donald, Owen	
This Life	This Life; This Life	Gary Barlow, Mark Owen, Howard Donald, Shawn Lee, Andy Platts	Gary Barlow	Barlow, Donald, Owen	
Throwing Stones	Said It All	Gary Barlow, Mark Owen, Howard Donald, Jason Orange, Milton Donald	Mark Owen	Barlow, Donald, Orange, Owen	
Time And Time Again	This Life	Gary Barlow, Mark Owen, Howard Donald, Ben Mark, Jamie Norton	Mark Owen	Barlow, Donald, Owen	
Today I've Lost You	Never Forget – The Ultimate Collection (bonus track)	Gary Barlow	Gary Barlow	Barlow, Donald, Orange, Owen	
Trouble with Me	Patience; Shine	Gary Barlow, Mark Owen, Howard Donald, Jason Orange, John Shanks	Gary Barlow	Barlow, Donald, Orange, Owen	
Underground Machine	Progress	Gary Barlow, Robbie Williams, Mark Owen, Howard Donald, Jason Orange	Robbie Williams	Barlow, Donald, Orange, Owen, Williams	
Up	Wonderland	Barlow, Donald, Owen, Jamie Norton, Ben Mark	Mark Owen	Barlow, Donald, Owen	
Up All Night	The Circus; Up All Night	Take That, Ben Mark, Jamie Norton	Mark Owen	Barlow, Donald, Orange, Owen	
Wait	Progress	Gary Barlow, Robbie Williams, Mark Owen, Howard Donald, Jason Orange	Robbie Williams, Gary Barlow, Howard Donald	Barlow, Donald, Orange, Owen, Williams	
Waiting Around	Take That & Party; The Platinum Collection; Do What U Like	Gary Barlow	Gary Barlow	Barlow, Donald, Orange, Owen, Williams	
Wasting My Time	Everything Changes; The Platinum Collection	Gary Barlow	Gary Barlow	Barlow, Donald, Orange, Owen, Williams	
We All Fall Down	Beautiful World (tour edition bonus track); I'd Wait for Life; Reach Out	Gary Barlow, Mark Owen, Howard Donald, Jason Orange, Steve Robson	Mark Owen	Barlow, Donald, Orange, Owen	
We Got All Day	This Life	Gary Barlow, Mark Owen, Howard Donald	Gary Barlow, Mark Owen, Howard Donald	Barlow, Donald, Owen	
We Love to Entertain You	Shine (German edition bonus track)	Gary Barlow, Mark Owen, Howard Donald, Jason Orange, John Shanks	Gary Barlow	Barlow, Donald, Orange, Owen	
What Do You Want from Me?	Progress	Gary Barlow, Robbie Williams, Mark Owen, Howard Donald, Jason Orange	Mark Owen	Barlow, Donald, Orange, Owen, Williams	
What Is Love	The Circus	Gary Barlow, Mark Owen, Howard Donald, Jason Orange	Howard Donald	Barlow, Donald, Orange, Owen	
What You Believe In	Beautiful World	Gary Barlow, Mark Owen, Howard Donald, Jason Orange, Anders Bagge	Mark Owen	Barlow, Donald, Orange, Owen	
Whatever You Do to Me	Everything Changes; The Platinum Collection	Gary Barlow	Gary Barlow	Barlow, Donald, Orange, Owen, Williams	
When We Were Young	Progressed; When We Were Young	Gary Barlow, Robbie Williams, Mark Owen, Howard Donald, Jason Orange	Robbie Williams, Gary Barlow	Barlow, Donald, Orange, Owen, Williams	
Where We Are	This Life	Gary Barlow, Mark Owen, Howard Donald, Tim Woodcock	Gary Barlow	Barlow, Donald, Owen	
Why Can't I Wake Up with You	Take That & Party; Everything Changes; Greatest Hits; The Best of Take That; Forever... Greatest Hits; Never Forget – The Ultimate Collection; The Platinum Collection; Why Can't I Wake Up with You; Back for Good	Gary Barlow	Gary Barlow	Barlow, Donald, Orange, Owen, Williams	
Windows	This Life; Windows	Gary Barlow, Mark Owen, Howard Donald	Gary Barlow	Barlow, Donald, Owen	
Will You Be There For Me	III (2015 edition bonus track)	Gary Barlow, Mark Owen, Howard Donald, Afshin Salmani, Josh Cumbee	Gary Barlow	Barlow, Donald, Owen	
Wonderful World	Progressed	Gary Barlow, Robbie Williams, Mark Owen, Howard Donald, Jason Orange	Mark Owen, Jason Orange	Barlow, Donald, Orange, Owen, Williams	
Wonderland	Wonderland	Gary Barlow, Mark Owen, Howard Donald, Jason Orange, Jamie Norton, Ben Mark	Gary Barlow, Howard Donald	Barlow, Donald, Owen	
Wooden Boat	Beautiful World	Gary Barlow, Mark Owen, Howard Donald, Jason Orange, Billy Mann, John Shanks	Jason Orange	Barlow, Donald, Orange, Owen	
You	The Circus	Gary Barlow, Mark Owen, Howard Donald, Jason Orange	Gary Barlow	Barlow, Donald, Orange, Owen	
You and Me	You and Me; This Life (Deluxe)	Gary Barlow, Mark Owen, Howard Donald	Gary Barlow	Barlow, Donald, Owen	
You Are the One	Everything Changes; The Platinum Collection	Gary Barlow	Gary Barlow	Barlow, Donald, Orange, Owen, Williams	
You're A Superstar	You're A Superstar	Gary Barlow, Mark Owen, Howard Donald, Jamie Scott	Gary Barlow	Barlow, Donald, Owen	

=== Songs not released as a studio recording ===
Released on music albums

- "Rock 'N' Roll Medley" - Released as a live recording on Forever... Greatest Hits
- "Motown Medley" - Released as a live recording on Forever... Greatest Hits
- "Clap Your Hands" - Released as a live recording on "Why Can't I Wake Up with You" (limited edition 7" version)
- "Take That Medley" - Released as a live recording on "A Million Love Songs" (Japanese version)
- "When They Were Young" - Released as a live medley on Progress Live

Released on other media

- "Apache 2006" - released as a live recording on Take That: The Ultimate Tour DVD
- "Let It Rain" - released as a live recording on Take That: The Ultimate Tour DVD

Unreleased

- "Rain Song" - Listed on ASCAP as copyrighted by the band, but never performed (possibly a misnomer for "Let It Rain")
- "Gun" - Seen as one of the listed tracks for the album "Progress" on the Take That documentary "Look Back, Don't Stare"

=== Commercially released remixes ===
- "Do What U Like" (club mix)
- "Do What U Like" (radio mix)
- "Do What U Like" (12" mix)
- "Promises" (7" radio mix)
- "Promises" (12" mix)
- "Once You've Tasted Love" (aural mix)
- "Once You've Tasted Love" (radio version)
- "Once You've Tasted Love" (Harding & Curnow Remix)
- "Guess Who Tasted Love" (Remix of "Once You've Tasted Love") Take That & Party, Once You've Tasted Love
- "Guess Who Tasted Love" (Guess Who Mix)
- "It Only Takes a Minute" (7" version)
- "It Only Takes a Minute" (Deep Club Mix)
- "It Only Takes a Minute" (Wright Vocal Mix)
- "It Only Takes a Minute" (new remix - radio version)
- "It Only Takes a Minute" (club version)
- "It Only Takes a Minute" (dub version)
- "It Only Takes a Minute" (underground vocal)
- "It Only Takes a Minute" (underground instrumental)
- "It Only Takes a Minute" (Royal Rave Mix)
- "It Only Takes a Minute" (Dem Drums)
- "It Only Takes a Minute" (Blondapella)
- "It Only Takes a Minute" (Love Dub)
- "It Only Takes a Minute" (Tommy Musto Underground Vocal)
- "It Only Takes a Minute" (Tommy Musto Underground Dub)
- "I Found Heaven" (7" radio mix)
- "I Found Heaven" (classic 12" mix)
- "I Found Heaven" (original 12" mix)
- "I Found Heaven" (Mr. F's Garage Mix)
- "Why Can't I Wake Up with You" (radio edit)
- "Why Can't I Wake Up with You?" (7" version) from Everything Changes
- "A Million Love Songs" (7" edit) A Million Love Songs, Back for Good
- "A Million Love Songs" (Lovers' Mix)
- "A Million Love Songs" (extended mix)
- "Could It Be Magic" (Deep in Rapino's Club Mix)
- "Could It Be Magic" (Take That Club Megamix)
- "Could It Be Magic" (Mr. F. Mix)
- "Could It Be Magic" (Rapino Radio Mix) Could It Be Magic, Take That & Party
- "Could It Be Magic" (Take That Radio Megamix)
- "Could It Be Magic" (a cappella)
- "Could It Be Magic" (Ciao Baby Mix)
- "Could It Be Magic" (Rapino Dub)
- "Could It Be Magic" (Paparazzo Mix)
- "Could It Be Magic" (Deep in Rapino's Dub)
- "Could It Be Magic" (Club Rapino Mix)
- "Why Can't I Wake Up with You" (1992 version)
- "Why Can't I Wake Up with You" (radio edit) Why Can't I Wake Up with You, Back for Good
- "Why Can't I Wake Up with You" (7" mix)
- "Why Can't I Wake Up with You" (club mix) Why Can't I Wake Up with You, Sure
- "Why Can't I Wake Up with You" (acoustic version)
- "Pray" (radio edit) Pray, Back for Good
- "Pray" (a cappella)
- "Pray" (alternative club mix)
- "Pray" (swing club mix)
- "Relight My Fire" (radio version)
- "Relight My Fire" (full-length version)
- "Relight My Fire" (Late Night Mix)
- "Relight My Fire" (All Night Mix)
- "Relight My Fire" (Night Beats)
- "Relight My Fire" (Percacapella)
- "Relight My Fire" (Love to Infinity Mix)
- "Relight My Fire" (Greed Mix)
- "Relight My Fire" (Element Remix) Relight My Fire, Never Forget: The Ultimate Collection
- "Babe" (Return Remix) Everything Changes
- "The Party Remix" Everything Changes, Forever... Greatest Hits
- "Never Want to Let You Go" (New Studio Mix) Take That & Party
- "Everything Changes" (7" version) Everything Changes
- "Everything Changes" (Nigel Lowis Remix) Everything Changes (album)
- "Everything Changes" (Nigel Lowis Extended Version)
- "Love Ain't Here Anymore" (US version) Nobody Else
- "You Are The One" (Tonic mix) Sure
- "Sure" (Thumpers Club Mix)
- "Sure" (Full Pressure Mix) Sure, Nobody Else
- "Sure" (Strictly Barking Dub)
- "Sure" (Brothers in Rhythm Mix)
- "Back for Good" (Radio Mix)
- "Back for Good" (Album Instrumental) Back for Good, Nobody Else
- "Back for Good" (Radio Instrumental)
- "Back for Good" (Urban Mix) Back for Good, Nobody Else
- "Back for Good" (Urban Instrumental)
- "Back For Good" (TV Mix)
- "Never Forget" (single mix radio edit)>
- "Never Forget" (single mix)
- "Patience" (stripped-down version) Shine
- "Patience" (Abbey Road version) The Greatest Day – Take That Present: The Circus Live
- "Shine" (radio mix) Shine
- "Shine" (Abbey Road version)
- "I'd Wait for Life" (radio edit)
- "We All Fall Down" (acoustic) Reach Out, Beautiful World Tour Edition
- "Rule the World" (radio edit)
- "Rule the World" (Abbey Road version)
- "Greatest Day" (radio mix)
- "Greatest Day" (Abbey Road version)
- "Up All Night" (radio mix)
- "Up All Night" (Abbey Road version) The Greatest Day – Take That Present: The Circus Live
- "The Garden" (radio edit)
- "The Garden" (Abbey Road version) The Greatest Day – Take That Present: The Circus Live
- "How Did It Come to This" (Abbey Road version)
- "What Is Love" (Abbey Road version)
- "The Circus" (Abbey Road version)
- "Julie" (Abbey Road version)
- "Said It All" (Abbey Road version)
- "The Flood" (instrumental)
- "The Flood" (radio edit) The Flood
- "Revenge of the Kidz" (Remix of "Kidz")
- "Happy Now" (Paul Oakenfold Radio Edit)
- "Happy Now" (Benny Benassi Radio Edit)
- "Happy Now" (Paul Oakenfold Remix)
- "Happy Now" (Benny Benassi Remix)
- "Love Love" (X-Men version)
- "When We Were Young" (single version)
- "When We Were Young" (single instrumental)
- "Eight Letters" (demo version) Deluxe edition of the Robbie Williams album Take the Crown
- "These Days" (instrumental)
- "These Days" (Steve Pitron & Max Sanna Club Mix) Digital Deluxe edition of III
- "Let in the Sun" (Monsieur Adi Remix)
- "Let in the Sun" (Instrumental)
- "Higher Than Higher" (Instrumental)
- "Hey Boy" (7th Heaven Club Mix)
- "Hey Boy" (7th Heaven Radio Edit)
- "Giants" (Acoustic)
- "Giants" (Oliver Nelson & Tobtok Remix)
- "Giants" (Piano Alternative Version)
- "Giants" (After Party Version)
- "Pray" (Odyssey Version)
- "Greatest Day" (Robin Schulz Remix feat. Calum Scott)
- "Windows" (Acoustic)
- "You and Me" (Acoustic)
- "Hanging onto Your Love" (Howard Donald 2025 Remix)
- "Said It All" (Jax Jones Rework feat. Leony)
- "You're A Superstar" (Lullaby Version)
- "Sweet July" (Acoustic)
