= The Platinum Collection (Take That album) =

Box set by Take That
- Released: 27 November 2006
- Recorded: 1990–1995
- Genre: Pop, Eurodance, dance, disco
- Label: Sony BMG

Take That chronology
Never Forget – The Ultimate Collection (2005)	The Platinum Collection (2006)	Beautiful World (2006)

The Platinum Collection is a compilation album by English boy band Take That. The album itself is a boxed collection of expanded editions of the band's first three albums, Take That & Party, Everything Changes and Nobody Else.

== Background ==
The album peaked at number 127 on the UK Albums Chart. The collection sold steadily over time and has received a sales certification in the UK of Silver, meaning 60,000 copies have been sold.

== Track listing ==
Disc 1 – Take That & Party

No.	Title	Writer(s)	Lead Vocals	Length
1.	"I Found Heaven"	Billy Griffin, Ian Levine	Robbie Williams	4:01
2.	"Once You've Tasted Love"	Gary Barlow	Gary Barlow	3:43
3.	"It Only Takes a Minute"	Brian Potter, Dennis Lambert	Gary Barlow	3:46
4.	"A Million Love Songs"	Gary Barlow	Gary Barlow	3:52
5.	"Satisfied"	Gary Barlow	Gary Barlow	4:29
6.	"I Can Make It"	Gary Barlow	Gary Barlow	4:10
7.	"Do What U Like"	Gary Barlow, Ray Hedges	Gary Barlow	3:06
8.	"Promises"	Gary Barlow, Graham Stack	Gary Barlow	3:34
9.	"Why Can't I Wake Up with You" (Orchestral Version)	Gary Barlow	Gary Barlow	4:12
10.	"Never Want to Let You Go" (New Studio Mix)	Gary Barlow	Gary Barlow	4:56
11.	"Give Good Feeling"	Gary Barlow	Gary Barlow	4:23
12.	"Could It Be Magic" (Original Version)	Barry Manilow	Robbie Williams	4:24
13.	"Take That and Party"	Gary Barlow, Ray Hedges	Gary Barlow	2:54
14.	"Waiting Around"	Gary Barlow	Gary Barlow	2:56
15.	"How Can It Be"	Gary Barlow	Gary Barlow	4:03
16.	"Guess Who Tasted Love"	Gary Barlow	Robbie Williams	5:21

Disc 2 – Everything Changes

No.	Title	Writer(s)	Lead Vocals	Length
1.	"Everything Changes"	Barlow, Baylis, Kennedy, Ward	Robbie Williams	3:34
2.	"Pray"	Gary Barlow	Gary Barlow	3:45
3.	"Wasting My Time"	Gary Barlow	Gary Barlow	3:45
4.	"Relight My Fire"	Dan Hartman	Gary Barlow	4:11
5.	"Love Ain't Here Anymore"	Gary Barlow	Gary Barlow	3:49
6.	"If This Is Love"	Howard Donald, Dave James	Howard Donald	3:56
7.	"Whatever You Do to Me"	Gary Barlow	Gary Barlow	3:44
8.	"Meaning of Love"	Gary Barlow	Gary Barlow	3:46
9.	"Why Can't I Wake Up With You" (Everything Changes Version)	Gary Barlow	Gary Barlow	3:37
10.	"You Are the One"	Gary Barlow	Gary Barlow	3:47
11.	"Another Crack in My Heart"	Gary Barlow	Gary Barlow	3:46
12.	"Broken Your Heart"	Gary Barlow	Gary Barlow	3:46
13.	"Babe"	Gary Barlow	Mark Owen	4:51
14.	"No Si Aqui No Hay Amor" ("Love Ain't Here Anymore" – Spanish Version)	Gary Barlow	Gary Barlow	3:55
15.	"The Party Remix"	Gary Barlow, Dennis Potter, Brian Lambert, Barry Manilow, Anderson	Gary Barlow, Robbie Williams	7:16
16.	"All I Want Is You"	Gary Barlow	Gary Barlow	3:21
17.	"Babe" (Return Remix)	Gary Barlow	Mark Owen	4:55

Disc 3 – Nobody Else

No.	Title	Writer(s)	Producer(s)	Length
1.	"Sure"	Gary Barlow, Mark Owen, Robbie Williams	Brothers in Rhythm	3:42
2.	"Back for Good"	Gary Barlow	Gary Barlow, Chris Porter	4:02
3.	"Every Guy"	Gary Barlow	Brothers in Rhythm, Gary Barlow	3:59
4.	"Sunday to Saturday"	Gary Barlow, Howard Donald, Mark Owen	Brothers in Rhythm, Gary Barlow	5:03
5.	"Nobody Else"	Gary Barlow	Gary Barlow, Chris Porter	5:48
6.	"Never Forget"	Gary Barlow	Brothers in Rhythm, James, Jim Steinman	5:12
7.	"Hanging Onto Your Love"	Gary Barlow, David Morales	David Morales	4:09
8.	"Holding Back the Tears"	Gary Barlow	Brothers in Rhythm, Gary Barlow	5:29
9.	"Hate It"	Gary Barlow	Brothers in Rhythm, Gary Barlow	3:41
10.	"Lady Tonight"	Gary Barlow	Brothers in Rhythm, Gary Barlow	4:37
11.	"The Day After Tomorrow"	Gary Barlow	Gary Barlow, Chris Porter	4:53
12.	"Sure" (Full Pressure Mix)	Gary Barlow, Mark Owen, Robbie Williams	Brothers in Rhythm	5:37
13.	"Back for Good" (Urban Mix)	Gary Barlow	Gary Barlow, Chris Porter	4:00
14.	"Every Guy" (Live Version)	Gary Barlow	Brothers in Rhythm, Gary Barlow	5:36

== Certifications ==
Region	Certification	Certified units/sales
United Kingdom (BPI)	Silver	60,000^{*}
^{*} Sales figures based on certification alone.
