= The Best of Take That =

Greatest hits album by Take That
- Released: 16 June 2001
- Recorded: 1990–1996
- Genre: Pop
- Length: 71:46
- Label: Calipso Entertainment
- Producer: Nigel Wright

Take That chronology
Greatest Hits (1996)	The Best of Take That (2001)	Forever... Greatest Hits (2002)

The Best of Take That is a repackaged version of English boy band Take That's first Greatest Hits compilation, which was released in 1996. The album was released via Calipso Entertainment, and became the first semi-new release since the band split up. The album has an identical track listing to their Greatest Hits album. The album was released on 16 June 2001, exclusively in Brazil and other areas of South America.

== Track listing ==
No.	Title	Writer(s)	Producer(s)	Length
1.	"How Deep Is Your Love"	Barry Gibb, Robin Gibb, Maurice Gibb	Take That	3:41
2.	"Never Forget"	Gary Barlow	Brothers in Rhythm, Dave James, Jim Steinman	6:24
3.	"Back for Good"	Barlow	Barlow, Chris Porter	4:01
4.	"Sure"	Barlow, Mark Owen, Robbie Williams	Brothers in Rhythm, Barlow	4:30
5.	"Love Ain't Here Anymore"	Barlow	Barlow	3:49
6.	"Everything Changes"	Barlow	Eliot Kennedy, Mike Ward	3:33
7.	"Babe"	Barlow	Jonathan Wales, Paul Jervier, Steve Jervier	4:55
8.	"Pray"	Barlow	Wales, Paul Jervier, Steve Jervier	3:43
9.	"Relight My Fire"	Dan Hartman	Joey Negro, Andrew Livingstone	4:06
10.	"Why Can't I Wake Up with You"	Barlow	Wales, Paul Jervier, Steve Jervier	3:37
11.	"Could It Be Magic"	Barry Manilow, Adrienne Anderson	The Rapino Brothers	4:28
12.	"A Million Love Songs"	Barlow	Billy Griffin, Ian Levine	3:52
13.	"I Found Heaven"	Griffin, Levine	Griffin, Levine	4:01
14.	"It Only Takes a Minute"	Denis Lambert, Brian Potter	Nigel Wright	3:46
15.	"Once You've Tasted Love"	Barlow	Duncan Bridgeman	3:43
16.	"Promises"	Barlow, Graham Stack	Pete Hammond	3:46
17.	"Do What U Like"	Barlow, Ray Hedges	Ray Hedges	3:07
18.	"Love Ain't Here Anymore" (US version)	Barlow	Barlow	4:07

== Personnel ==
- Gary Barlow – vocals, songwriter
- Robbie Williams – vocals
- Jason Orange – vocals
- Mark Owen – vocals
- Howard Donald – vocals
