= Never Forget – The Ultimate Collection =

Greatest hits album by Take That
- Released: 14 November 2005
- Recorded: 1990–1995, 2005
- Genre: Pop; dance; R&B
- Length: 72:11
- Label: RCA
- Producer: Gary Barlow; Cary Baylis; Mark Beswick; Duncan Bridgeman; Brothers in Rhythm; Billy Griffin; Peter Hammond; Ray Hedges; Dave James; Paul Jervier; Steve Jervier; Eliot Kennedy; Ian Levine; Andrew Livingstone; Joey Negro; Chris Porter; Jim Steinman; Jonathan Wales; Nigel Wright; Dave Clayton; Howard Donald; Jason Orange; Mark Owen

Take That chronology
Greatest Hits (1996)	Never Forget – The Ultimate Collection (2005)	Beautiful World (2006)

Never Forget – The Ultimate Collection is the third greatest hits album by English boy band Take That. It was released on 14 November 2005, nearly ten years after their initial split. It has sold over 2.36 million copies in the UK since release, as of July 2016.

== Background and release ==
Never Forget – The Ultimate Collection was released to coincide with the ITV1 documentary Take That: For the Record, in which band members Gary Barlow, Howard Donald, Jason Orange, Mark Owen and Robbie Williams aired their views over their fame, success, the split and what the post-Williams line-up had done since. The launch of the album took place at the Coronet Cinema in Notting Hill, London on 14 November 2005, the same day as the album's release. Williams did not make an appearance at the launch as he had chosen not to take part in the band's reunion. Owen said: "It would have been great to have had Robbie here tonight, but we were really glad he was involved in the documentary. I know Rob left early, but our memory is of us as a five, and I wouldn't have liked it if it was just us four."

The album contains 16 of the band's 18 singles, excluding their debut single, "Do What U Like", and the internationally released "Sunday to Saturday", as well as three bonus recordings. One of the bonus recordings, "Today I've Lost You", was recorded especially for the album after it was originally scrapped in 1995. "Relight My Fire" was remixed, and was due to be issued as a single to promote the release of the album, but it was withdrawn just two days before its initial release date. All editions of the album feature the same track listing.

A DVD was released at the same time.

== Critical reception ==
In a highly positive review, The Guardian's Marc Burrows called the album "18 tracks of brilliance".

== Commercial performance ==
The album sold 90,000 copies in its first week, peaking at number 2 on the UK Albums Chart behind Confessions on a Dance Floor by Madonna. It has been certified as 8× Platinum in the UK and has sold 2.36 million copies. Since its release, the album spent 218 weeks in the UK Top 100.

== Track listing ==
Standard edition
No.	Title	Writer(s)	Producer(s)	Length
1.	"Never Forget" (single mix) (from Nobody Else, 1995)	Gary Barlow	Brothers in Rhythm; Dave James; Jim Steinman (remix)	6:24
2.	"Back for Good" (from Nobody Else)	Barlow	Barlow; Chris Porter	4:02
3.	"How Deep Is Your Love" (from Greatest Hits, 1996)	Barry Gibb; Robin Gibb; Maurice Gibb	Barlow; Howard Donald; Jason Orange; Mark Owen; Porter	3:42
4.	"Pray" (from Everything Changes, 1993)	Barlow	Jonathan Wales; Paul Jervier; Steve Jervier	3:45
5.	"Relight My Fire" (featuring Lulu) (from Everything Changes)	Dan Hartman	Joey Negro; Andrew Livingstone	4:10
6.	"Everything Changes" (radio edit) (from Everything Changes)	Barlow; Cary Baylis; Eliot Kennedy; Mike Ward	Kennedy; Ward	3:35
7.	"Babe" (return remix) (from Everything Changes)	Barlow	Wales; P. Jervier; S. Jervier; Porter (remix); Dave Clayton (remix)	4:51
8.	"Sure" (from Nobody Else)	Barlow; Owen; Robbie Williams	Brothers in Rhythm; Barlow	3:41
9.	"It Only Takes a Minute" (from Take That & Party, 1992)	Denis Lambert; Brian Potter	Nigel Wright	3:48
10.	"A Million Love Songs" (from Take That & Party)	Barlow	Billy Griffin; Ian Levine	3:54
11.	"Could It Be Magic" (Rapino Radio Mix) (from Take That & Party)	Barry Manilow; Adrienne Anderson	Griffin; Levine; The Rapino Brothers (remix)	3:31
12.	"Why Can't I Wake Up with You" (from Everything Changes)	Barlow	Wales; P. Jervier; S. Jervier	3:39
13.	"Love Ain't Here Anymore" (US version) (from Nobody Else US edition; original version from Everything Changes)	Barlow	Porter	4:09
14.	"I Found Heaven" (from Take That & Party)	Griffin; Levine	Griffin; Levine	4:03
15.	"Promises" (from Take That & Party)	Barlow; Graham Stack	Pete Hammond	3:36
16.	"Once You've Tasted Love" (from Take That & Party)	Barlow	Duncan Bridgeman	3:44
17.	"Pray" (live in Berlin, Germany, 1994)	Barlow	Wales; P. Jervier; S. Jervier	5:16
18.	"Relight My Fire" (featuring Lulu) (Elemental remix)	Hartman	Negro; Livingstone; Elemental (remix); Lee Dagger (remix); Marc JB (remix)	3:49
19.	"Today I've Lost You" (previously unreleased, 2005)	Barlow	Porter	3:07

DVD: Never Forget: The Ultimate Video Collection
No.	Title	Writer(s)	Producer(s)	Length
1.	"Never Forget"	Barlow	Brothers in Rhythm; James; Steinman (remix)	6:24
2.	"Back for Good"	Barlow	Barlow; Porter	4:02
3.	"How Deep Is Your Love"	B. Gibb; R. Gibb; M. Gibb	Barlow; Donald; Orange; Owen; Porter	3:42
4.	"Pray"	Barlow	Wales; P. Jervier; S. Jervier	3:45
5.	"Relight My Fire" (featuring Lulu)	Hartman	Negro; Livingstone	4:10
6.	"Everything Changes"	Barlow; Baylis; Kennedy; Ward	Kennedy; Ward	3:35
7.	"Babe"	Barlow	Wales; P. Jervier; S. Jervier; Porter (remix); Clayton (remix)	4:51
8.	"Sure"	Barlow; Owen; Williams	Brothers in Rhythm; Barlow	3:41
9.	"It Only Takes a Minute"	Lambert; Potter	Wright	3:48
10.	"A Million Love Songs"	Barlow	Griffin; Levine	3:54
11.	"Could It Be Magic"	Manilow; Anderson	Griffin; Levine; The Rapino Brothers (remix)	3:31
12.	"Why Can't I Wake Up with You"	Barlow	Wales; P. Jervier; S. Jervier	3:39
13.	"Love Ain't Here Anymore"	Barlow	Wales; P. Jervier; S. Jervier	3:49
14.	"I Found Heaven"	Griffin; Levine	Griffin; Levine	4:03
15.	"Promises"	Barlow; Graham Stack	Hammond	3:36
16.	"Once You've Tasted Love" (from Take That & Party)	Barlow	Bridgeman	3:48
17.	"It Only Takes a Minute" (live at Wembley Arena, London, England, 1993)	Lambert; Potter		3:48
18.	"A Million Love Songs" (live in Manchester, England, 1994)	Barlow		3:48
19.	"Why Can't I Wake Up with You" (live in Manchester, England, 1994)	Barlow		4:12
20.	"Pray" (live at Wembley Arena, London, England, 1993)	Lambert; Potter		3:45
21.	"Love Ain't Here Anymore" (live in Manchester, England, 1994)	Barlow		3:49
22.	"Sure" (live in Manchester, England, 1994)	Barlow; Owen; Williams		4:12
23.	"Beatles Medley" ("I Wanna Hold Your Hand"/"A Hard Day's Night"/"She Loves You"/"I Feel Fine"/"Get Back"/"Hey Jude") (live in Manchester, England, 1994)	John Lennon; Paul McCartney		4:12
24.	"Back for Good" (live at the 1995 Brit Awards)	Barlow		4:02
25.	"On The Road" (unseen footage & photo gallery)	Barlow		4:02

== Charts ==
=== Weekly charts ===
Weekly chart performance for Never Forget – The Ultimate Collection
Chart (2005–2007)	Peak position
Australian Albums (ARIA)	72
Belgian Albums (Ultratop Flanders)	76
European Albums Chart	14
German Albums (Offizielle Top 100)	91
Irish Albums (IRMA)	12
Scottish Albums (OCC)	4
Swiss Albums (Schweizer Hitparade)	73
Taiwanese Albums (G-Music)	9
UK Albums (OCC)	2

=== Year-end charts ===
Year-end chart performance for Never Forget – The Ultimate Collection
Chart (2005)	Position
UK Albums (OCC)	19
Chart (2006)	Position
UK Albums (OCC)	52
Chart (2007)	Position
UK Albums (OCC)	35
Chart (2008)	Position
UK Albums (OCC)	52
Chart (2009)	Position
UK Albums (OCC)	77
Chart (2010)	Position
UK Albums (OCC)	88
Chart (2011)	Position
UK Albums (OCC)	82

=== Decade-end charts ===
Decade-end chart performance for Never Forget – The Ultimate Collection
Chart (2000–2009)	Position
UK Albums (OCC)	32

== Certifications ==
Region	Certification	Certified units/sales
Germany (BVMI)	Gold	100,000^{‡}
Ireland (IRMA)	3× Platinum	45,000^{^}
United Kingdom (BPI)	8× Platinum	2,400,000^{‡}
Summaries
Europe (IFPI)	2× Platinum	2,000,000^{*}
^{*} Sales figures based on certification alone.^{^} Shipments figures based on certification alone.^{‡} Sales+streaming figures based on certification alone.

== Release history ==
Region	Date	Label	Cat. no
United Kingdom (Slipcase Edition)	14 November 2005	RCA	82876748522
Europe	21 November 2005	RCA	82876748522
Japan	22 February 2006	BMG	BVCM-31185
United Kingdom (Standard Edition)	27 November 2007	RCA	82876748522
United Kingdom ("Girls Night In" Edition)	14 January 2008	RCA	82876748522
Europe ("Girls Night In" Edition)	7 April 2008	RCA	82876748522
