= Greatest Hits (Take That album) =

Greatest hits album by Take That
- Released: 25 March 1996
- Recorded: 1990–1995
- Genre: Pop
- Length: 71:46
- Label: RCA
- Producers: Gary Barlow; Cary Baylis; Mark Beswick; Duncan Bridgeman; Brothers in Rhythm; Billy Griffin; Peter Hammond; Ray Hedges; Dave James; Paul Jervier; Steve Jervier; Eliot Kennedy; Ian Levine; Andrew Livingstone; Joey Negro; Chris Porter; Jim Steinman; Jonathan Wales; Nigel Wright; Dave Clayton; Howard Donald; Jason Orange; Mark Owen

Take That chronology
Nobody Else (1995)	Greatest Hits (1996)	Never Forget – The Ultimate Collection (2005)

Singles from Greatest Hits
- 1. "How Deep Is Your Love" Released: 26 February 1996

Professional ratings
Review scores
Source	Rating
AllMusic	4.5/5 stars
The Guardian	2/5 stars
Melody Maker	(favorable)
Smash Hits	5/5 stars

Greatest Hits is the first greatest hits compilation album by English boy band Take That. It was released on 25 March 1996.

== Background ==
Following the departure of Robbie Williams, Take That started touring as a four-piece until the announcement of their split on 13 February 1996.

The greatest hits compilation was released by RCA Records on 25 March 1996, and contained their final single, a cover of the Bee Gees' "How Deep Is Your Love", which became their final number one hit on the UK Singles Chart before their reunion in 2005.

The album had one of the highest first-week sales in UK chart history with pre-sales of around 500,000 and outselling its nearest rival by more than six to one at the end of the week.

The album reached number one in the UK, Ireland, Germany, Spain, Austria, Italy, Denmark and the Netherlands. The compilation was re-released in 1998 and 2004. The album was the 10th best selling of 1996 in the UK, and has since been certified 4× Platinum in the UK. The album topped the European Albums Chart for four consecutive weeks and sold 5 million copies worldwide.

The album re-entered the Irish Albums Chart after Take That performed the Irish leg of their Circus Tour on 13 June 2009, in Dublin. The album also returned on the Danish Albums Chart in 2011 at number eleven after the band's Danish leg of their Progress Live tour.

== Track listings ==
Album (74321 355582)
No.	Title	Writer(s)	Producer(s)	Length
1.	"How Deep Is Your Love" (previously unreleased, 1996)	Barry Gibb; Robin Gibb; Maurice Gibb	Gary Barlow; Howard Donald; Jason Orange; Mark Owen; Chris Porter	3:41
2.	"Never Forget" (single mix) (from Nobody Else, 1995)	Barlow	Brothers in Rhythm; Dave James; Jim Steinman (remix)	6:24
3.	"Back for Good" (from Nobody Else)	Barlow	Barlow; Porter	4:01
4.	"Sure" (from Nobody Else)	Barlow; Owen; Robbie Williams	Brothers in Rhythm; Barlow	3:42
5.	"Love Ain't Here Anymore" (from Everything Changes, 1993)	Barlow	Jonathan Wales; Paul Jervier; Steve Jervier	3:49
6.	"Everything Changes" (radio edit) (from Everything Changes)	Barlow; Cary Baylis; Eliot Kennedy; Mike Ward	Kennedy; Ward	3:33
7.	"Babe" (return remix) (from Everything Changes)	Barlow	Wales; P. Jervier; S. Jervier; Porter (remix); Dave Clayton (remix)	4:55
8.	"Relight My Fire" (featuring Lulu) (from Everything Changes)	Dan Hartman	Joey Negro; Andrew Livingstone	4:06
9.	"Pray" (from Everything Changes)	Barlow	Wales; P. Jervier; S. Jervier	3:43
10.	"Why Can't I Wake Up with You" (from Everything Changes)	Barlow	Wales; P. Jervier; S. Jervier	3:37
11.	"Could It Be Magic" (Radio Rapino mix) (from Take That & Party, 1992)	Barry Manilow; Adrienne Anderson	Billy Griffin; Ian Levine; The Rapino Brothers (remix)	3:30
12.	"A Million Love Songs" (from Take That & Party)	Barlow	Griffin; Levine	3:52
13.	"I Found Heaven" (from Take That & Party)	Griffin; Levine	Griffin; Levine	4:01
14.	"It Only Takes a Minute" (from Take That & Party)	Denis Lambert; Brian Potter	Nigel Wright	3:46
15.	"Once You've Tasted Love" (from Take That & Party)	Barlow	Duncan Bridgeman	3:43
16.	"Promises" (from Take That & Party)	Barlow; Graham Stack	Pete Hammond	3:36
17.	"Do What U Like" (from Take That & Party)	Barlow; Ray Hedges	Hedges; Stack	3:07
18.	"Love Ain't Here Anymore" (US version) (from Nobody Else US edition)	Barlow	Porter	4:07

Japanese bonus track
No.	Title	Writer(s)	Producer(s)	Length
19.	"Sunday to Saturday" (from Nobody Else)	Barlow; Donald; Owen	Brothers in Rhythm; Barlow	5:03

VHS: Greatest Hits - The Video Collection
No.	Title	Writer(s)	Producer(s)	Length
1.	"How Deep Is Your Love"	B. Gibb; R. Gibb; M. Gibb	Barlow; Donald; Owen; Orange; Porter	3:41
2.	"Never Forget"	Barlow	Brothers in Rhythm; James; Steinman	6:24
3.	"Back for Good"	Barlow	Barlow; Porter	4:01
4.	"Sure"	Barlow; Owen; Williams	Brothers in Rhythm; Barlow	4:30
5.	"Love Ain't Here Anymore"	Barlow	Wales; P. Jervier; S. Jervier	3:49
6.	"Everything Changes"	Barlow	Kennedy; Ward	3:33
7.	"Babe"	Barlow	Wales; P. Jervier; S. Jervier; Porter; Clayton	4:55
8.	"Relight My Fire" (featuring Lulu)	Hartman	Negro; Livingstone	4:06
9.	"Pray"	Barlow	Wales; P. Jervier; S. Jervier	3:43
10.	"Why Can't I Wake Up with You"	Barlow	Wales; P. Jervier; S. Jervier	3:37
11.	"Could It Be Magic"	Manilow; Anderson	Griffin; Levine; The Rapino Brothers	4:28
12.	"A Million Love Songs"	Barlow	Griffin; Levine	3:52
13.	"I Found Heaven"	Griffin; Levine	Griffin; Levine	4:01
14.	"It Only Takes a Minute"	Lambert; Potter	Wright	3:46
15.	"Once You've Tasted Love"	Barlow	Bridgeman	3:43
16.	"Promises"	Barlow; Stack	Hammond	3:36
17.	"Do What U Like"	Barlow; Hedges	Hedges; Stack	3:07
18.	"Love Ain't Here Anymore" (US version) (end credits)	Barlow	Porter	4:07

== Personnel ==
- Gary Barlow – vocals, producer
- Howard Donald – vocals
- Jason Orange – vocals
- Mark Owen – vocals
- Robbie Williams – vocals
- Morgan Penn – artwork and design
- Philip Ollerenshaw – photography

== Charts ==
=== Weekly charts ===
Chart (1996)	Peak position
Australian Albums (ARIA)	10
Austrian Albums (Ö3 Austria)	1
Belgian Albums (Ultratop Flanders)	2
Belgian Albums (Ultratop Wallonia)	4
Canadian Albums (RPM)	38
Czech Albums (IFPI CR)	6
Danish Albums (Tracklisten)	1
Dutch Albums (MegaCharts)	1
Estonian Albums (Eesti Top 10)	1
European Albums Chart	1
Finnish Albums (Suomen virallinen lista)	6
French Albums (SNEP)	23
German Albums (Offizielle Top 100)	1
Greek Albums (IFPI Greece)	1
Hungarian Albums (MAHASZ)	4
Icelandic Albums (Tonlist)	5
Irish Albums (IRMA)	1
Italian Albums (FIMI)	1
Italian Albums (Musica e Dischi)	5
Japanese Albums (Oricon)	12
Norwegian Albums (VG-lista)	6
Portuguese Albums (AFP)	3
Scottish Albums (OCC)	1
Singapore Albums (SPVA)	1
Spanish Albums (PROMUSICAE)	1
Swedish Albums (Sverigetopplistan)	4
Swiss Albums (Schweizer Hitparade)	2
UK Albums (OCC)	1
Chart (2009)	Peak position
Irish Albums (IRMA)	24
Chart (2011)	Peak position
Danish Albums (Tracklisten)	11

=== Year-end charts ===
Chart (1996)	Position
Austrian Albums (Ö3 Austria)	8
Dutch Albums (Album Top 100)	17
Estonian Albums (Eesti Top 10)	9
European Albums (Eurochart Hot 100)	11
German Albums (Offizielle Top 100)	15
Italian Albums (Musica e dischi)	59
Norwegian Albums (VG-lista)	4
Spanish Albums (AFYVE)	26
Swedish Albums (Sverigetopplistan)	57
Swiss Albums (Schweizer Hitparade)	26
UK Albums (OCC)	10

=== Decade-end charts ===
Chart (1990–1999)	Position
UK Albums Chart	78

== Certifications ==
Region	Certification	Certified units/sales
Argentina (CAPIF)	Gold	30,000^{^}
Australia (ARIA)	Gold	35,000^{^}
Austria (IFPI Austria)	Platinum	50,000^{*}
Belgium (BRMA)	Gold	25,000^{*}
Denmark (IFPI Danmark)	4× Platinum	80,000^{‡}
Germany (BVMI)	Platinum	500,000^{^}
Japan (RIAJ)	Platinum	200,000^{^}
Netherlands (NVPI)	Platinum	100,000^{^}
Norway (IFPI Norway)	Gold	25,000^{*}
Spain (Promusicae)	Platinum	100,000^{^}
Sweden (GLF)	Gold	50,000^{^}
Switzerland (IFPI Switzerland)	Platinum	50,000^{^}
Taiwan (RIT)	5× Platinum+Gold	279,419
United Kingdom (BPI)	4× Platinum	1,200,000^{‡}
Summaries
Europe (IFPI)	3× Platinum	3,000,000^{*}
^{*} Sales figures based on certification alone.^{^} Shipments figures based on certification alone.^{‡} Sales+streaming figures based on certification alone.

== Release history ==
Region	Date	Label	Cat. No
United Kingdom	25 March 1996	RCA	82876748522
Europe	25 March 1996	BMG	B00000JSPE
Japan	3 April 1996	BMG	BVCP-926
America	1 December 1998	RCA	B00000JSPE
