= Forever... Greatest Hits =

Forever...Greatest Hits

Greatest hits album by Take That
- Released: 28 November 2002
- Recorded: 1990–1996
- Genre: Pop
- Length: 103:43
- Label: Sony BMG
- Producer: Nigel Wright

Take That chronology
The Best of Take That (2000)	Forever...Greatest Hits (2002)	Never Forget: The Ultimate Collection (2005)

Forever... Greatest Hits is the second greatest hits compilation released by English boy band Take That. The album is a mixture of hits taken from their first three studio albums, as well as a selection of B-sides and remixes, some of which have never before been released. The album includes a total of thirty-four tracks.

== Track listings ==
Disc 1
No.	Title	Writer(s)	Original appearance(s)	Length
1.	"The Party Remix" ("Relight My Fire" / "Could It Be Magic?" / "It Only Takes a Minute" / "Everything Changes")	Dan Hartman / Barry Manilow, Adrienne Anderson / Gary Barlow / Dennis Lambert, Brian Potter	"Love Ain't Here Anymore" B-side	7:16
2.	"All That Matters to Me"	Barlow	Nobody Else Japanese edition	5:03
3.	"Beatles Medley" ("I Wanna Hold Your Hand" / "A Hard Day's Night" / "She Loves You")	John Lennon, Paul McCartney	"Everything Changes" B-side	3:36
4.	"Back for Good"	Barlow	Nobody Else	4:02
5.	"How Deep Is Your Love"	Robin Gibb, Barry Gibb, Maurice Gibb	Greatest Hits	3:36
6.	"No Si Aquí No Hay Amor"	Barlow	"Everything Changes" Spanish version	3:54
7.	"How Can It Be"	Barlow	"A Million Love Songs" B-side	4:03
8.	"Pray"	Barlow	Everything Changes	3:41
9.	"Why Can't I Wake Up with You" (Everything Changes version)	Barlow	Everything Changes	3:36
10.	"Everything Changes"	Barlow, Eliot Kennedy, Cary Baylis, Mark Ward	Everything Changes	3:35
11.	"All I Want Is You"	Barlow	"Babe" B-side	3:21
12.	"Sure"	Barlow, Mark Owen, Robbie Williams	Nobody Else	3:38
13.	"Every Guy"	Barlow	Nobody Else	5:03
14.	"Relight My Fire"	Hartman	Everything Changes	4:21
15.	"Meaning of Love"	Barlow	Everything Changes	3:36
16.	"Sunday to Saturday"	Barlow, Howard Donald, Robbie Williams	Nobody Else	5:03
17.	"The Day After Tomorrow"	Barlow	Nobody Else	3:47

Disc 2
No.	Title	Writer(s)	Original appearance(s)	Length
1.	"Rock 'n' Roll Medley" ("Born to Hand Jive" / "Great Balls of Fire" / "Under the Moon of Love" / "Teddy Bear")	Jim Jacobs, Warren Casey / Jack Hammer, Otis Blackwell / Tommy Boyce, Curtis Lee / Bernie Lowe, Kal Mann	"Love Ain't Here Anymore" B-side	7:36
2.	"Never Forget" (Nobody Else remix)	Barlow	Nobody Else	5:12
3.	"Love Ain't Here Anymore" (US version)	Barlow	Nobody Else American edition	4:04
4.	"Babe" (Everything Changes radio remix)	Barlow	Everything Changes	4:51
5.	"A Million Love Songs"	Barlow	Take That & Party	3:52
6.	"Could It Be Magic" (Radio Rapino Mix)	Manilow, Anderson	Take That & Party	3:29
7.	"I Found Heaven"	Levine, Griffin	Take That & Party	4:02
8.	"It Only Takes a Minute"	Lambert, Potter	Take That & Party	3:36
9.	"Once You've Tasted Love"	Barlow	Take That & Party	3:36
10.	"Promises"	Barlow, Graham Stack	Take That & Party	3:14
11.	"Do What U Like"	Barlow, Ray Hedges	Take That & Party	3:06
12.	"Take That & Party"	Barlow, Hedges	Take That & Party	2:49
13.	"Motown Medley" ("I Found Heaven" / "Just My Imagination" / "My Girl" / "Reach Out (I'll Be There)" / "Get Ready" / "I Feel Good" / "I Found Heaven" (reprise))	Levine, Griffin / Norman Whitfield, Barrett Strong / Smokey Robinson, Ronnie White / Holland–Dozier–Holland / Robinson / James Brown	"Relight My Fire" B-side	10:14
14.	"Broken Your Heart"	Barlow	Everything Changes	4:05
15.	"Still Can't Get Over You"	Barlow	"A Million Love Songs" B-side	3:48
16.	"Don't Take Your Love"	Barlow	"A Million Love Songs" B-side	4:47
17.	"Love Ain't Here Anymore"	Barlow	Everything Changes	3:54

== Personnel ==
- Gary Barlow – vocals
- Howard Donald – vocals
- Jason Orange – vocals
- Mark Owen – vocals
- Robbie Williams – vocals
