= James Martin Charlton =

English director, playwright and filmmaker (born 1966)

James Martin Charlton (born 29 July 1966) is an English playwright, theatre director and filmmaker. He was born in Romford, Greater London, United Kingdom in 1966.

== Career ==
His play Fat Souls won the 1992 International Playwriting Festival at Warehouse Theatre, Croydon, where it premièred in 1993. Fat Souls and the plays which followed it - Groping in the Dark and Coming Up - use verse dialogue, soliloquies and emblematic characterisation all strapped to contemporary stories. The spiritual/anarchist strain in his writing continued in Divine Vision, a biographical play about the relationship between William Blake and his patron, William Hayley, and a stage adaptation of John Bunyan's The Pilgrim's Progress.

In 2001, his play ecstasy + GRACE attracted media attention due to its portrait of paedophilia and moral degeneracy. The play went on to receive a mauling by leading critics, although other reviewers were more enthusiastic. Charlton's subsequent plays include I Really Must be Getting Off, a contemporary gay version of the country house play, Fellow Creature, a short play produced by The Miniaturists and Coward, a speculative play about Noël Coward, first performed in 2012.

Since 1996, Charlton has been artistic director of Friendly Fire Productions. Friendly Fire's productions include Gob by Jim Kenworth starring ex-Take That star Jason Orange at The King's Head Theatre in 1999, which Charlton directed. He has also directed shows with casts of prisoners at HMP Maidstone, including The Who's Tommy.

His short film Apeth was shown at a number of international film festivals.

He currently lectures in scriptwriting and is Head of Media Department at Middlesex University.

== Plays ==
- What Are Neighbours For? (Fallen Angel, 1985)
- Straight to the Top (Etcetera Theatre, 1988)
- More About the Language of Love (New Copenhagen, 1991)
- Fat Souls (Warehouse Theatre, 1993)
- The World & his Wife (White Bear Theatre, 1995)
- Groping in the Dark (Warehouse Theatre/Mermaid Theatre, 1996)
- Coming Up (Warehouse Theatre, 1997)
- Divine Vision (Swedenborg Hall, 2000)
- The Pilgrim's Progress (after Bunyan) (Royal Shakespeare Company commission, 2000)
- ecstacy + GRACE (Finborough Theatre, 2001)
- Desires of Frankenstein (Open Air Theatre, 2001/Pleasance Theatre Edinburgh, 2002)
- I Really Must Be Getting Off (White Bear Theatre, 2005)
- Whatever (Soho Theatre workshop, 2005)
- Fellow Creature (Miniaturists at Arcola Theatre, 2009)
- Coward (Just Some Theatre, 2012)
- Been on the Job Too Long (TheatreN16, 2015)

== Films ==
- Best Shot (short, co-writer, 2006)
- Apeth (short, director/writer, 2007)
- Academic (short, director/writer/actor, 2011)
