= Nobody Else =

Studio album by Take That
- Released: 1 May 1995
- Recorded: 1994–1995
- Genres: Pop; R&B
- Length: 50:40
- Labels: RCA; BMG
- Producers: Gary Barlow; Brothers in Rhythm; Chris Porter; David Morales; Dave James

Take That chronology
Everything Changes (1993)	Nobody Else (1995)	Greatest Hits (1996)

Alternative cover
- American cover

Singles from Nobody Else
- 1. "Sure" Released: 3 October 1994; 2. "Back for Good" Released: 27 March 1995; 3. "Never Forget" Released: 24 July 1995; 4. "Sunday to Saturday" Released: 21 September 1995 (Japan only)

Professional ratings
Review scores
Source	Rating
AllMusic	4.0/5 stars
Encyclopedia of Popular Music	3/5 stars
Knoxville News Sentinel	2/5 stars
Music Week	4/5 stars
NME	7/10

Nobody Else is the third studio album by English boy band Take That. It would become Take That's last studio album to be recorded before their initial disbandment in 1996. The album includes the singles "Sure", "Back for Good" and "Never Forget", as well as "Sunday to Saturday", which was released in Japan only. "Nobody Else" won Best Album and Cover Sleeve at the 1995 Smash Hits Awards. The album sold 6 million copies worldwide. It was also the last album to feature Robbie Williams before his departure from the group that July.

== Background ==
Nobody Else was released on 1 May 1995 in the UK, Europe and Asia and on 15 August 1995 in North America. This album saw lead singer and songwriter Gary Barlow take an extensive role in the overall production, co-producing all but two tracks with Chris Porter and Brothers in Rhythm. During the recording of the album, Barlow disagreed with manager Nigel Martin-Smith over the band's musical direction—Barlow preferred to write adult contemporary ballads while Martin-Smith pushed him into pursuing a heavier R&B direction for the album in an attempt to break the band into the US market. It would become Take That's last studio album to be recorded before they disbanded in 1996, and also the last album to feature Robbie Williams until his return to the band in 2010 for Progress. In the UK, the album debuted at number one, selling 163,399 copies in its first week. The album spawned three UK number-one singles: "Sure", "Back for Good", which went to number one in over 31 countries worldwide, and "Never Forget". "Every Guy" was also issued as a promotional single, and "Sunday to Saturday" was issued as a single in Japan instead of "Never Forget", where it reached number 9.

The single release of "Never Forget" in July 1995 marked the departure of Williams, who started a solo career the following year. The album reached number one in the UK, German, Dutch, Irish, Finnish, Belgian, Austrian, Italian and Swiss charts, and was also released in the US by Arista Records on 15 August 1995, albeit with a different track listing, switching out four album tracks for three singles from Everything Changes: "Pray", "Babe" and "Love Ain't Here Anymore". For the album's American release, its cover was replaced by a picture of the group that excluded Williams.

The album topped the European Albums Chart for five consecutive weeks.

In support of the album, the band went on the Nobody Else Tour, playing 31 dates across countries such as the UK, Australia, Thailand, Singapore and Japan. Footage from the concert was released on video, entitled Nobody Else: The Movie. The album has been certified 2× Platinum in the UK. The track "All That Matters to Me" appears exclusively on the Japanese edition of the album.

== Track listing ==
All tracks are written by Gary Barlow, additional songwriters are noted below.

No.	Title	Writer(s)	Producer(s)	Length
1.	"Sure" (lead vocals: Barlow)	Mark Owen; Robbie Williams	Brothers in Rhythm; Gary Barlow	3:42
2.	"Back for Good" (lead vocals: Barlow)		Chris Porter; Barlow	4:02
3.	"Every Guy" (lead vocals: Barlow, Williams)		Brothers in Rhythm; Barlow	3:59
4.	"Sunday to Saturday" (lead vocals: Barlow)	Howard Donald; Owen	Brothers in Rhythm; Barlow	5:03
5.	"Nobody Else" (lead vocals: Barlow)		Porter; Barlow	5:48
6.	"Never Forget" (lead vocals: Donald)		Dave James; Brothers in Rhythm	5:12
7.	"Hanging Onto Your Love" (lead vocals: Barlow)	David Morales	Morales	4:09
8.	"Holding Back the Tears" (lead vocals: Barlow)		Brothers in Rhythm; Barlow	5:29
9.	"Hate It" (lead vocals: Barlow, Williams)		Porter; Barlow	3:41
10.	"Lady Tonight" (lead vocals: Barlow, Williams)		Brothers in Rhythm; Barlow	4:37
11.	"The Day After Tomorrow" (lead vocals: Owen)		Porter; Barlow	4:53

Nobody Else — Japanese edition (bonus tracks)
No.	Title	Producer(s)	Length
12.	"All That Matters to Me" (lead vocals: Barlow)	Brothers in Rhythm; Barlow	5:26
13.	"Back for Good" (instrumental)	Porter; Barlow	4:03

Nobody Else — 2006 expanded edition (bonus tracks)
No.	Title	Writer(s)	Producer(s)	Length
12.	"Sure" (full pressure mix) (lead vocals: Barlow)	Owen; Williams	Brothers in Rhythm; Barlow; T-Love; Merlin	5:37
13.	"Back for Good" (urban mix) (lead vocals: Barlow)		Porter; Barlow	4:00
14.	"Every Guy" (live)			5:36

Nobody Else — American edition
No.	Title	Writer(s)	Producer(s)	Length
1.	"Sure" (lead vocals: Barlow)	Owen; Williams	Brothers in Rhythm; Barlow	3:42
2.	"Back for Good" (lead vocals: Barlow)		Porter; Barlow	4:02
3.	"Babe" (return remix) (lead vocals: Owen)		Steve Jervier; Paul Jervier; Jonathan Wales; Mark Beswick; Porter; Dave Clayton	4:55
4.	"Pray" (lead vocals: Barlow)		S. Jervier; P. Jervier; Wales; Beswick	3:43
5.	"Nobody Else" (lead vocals: Barlow)		Porter; Barlow	5:48
6.	"Never Forget" (lead vocals: Donald)		James; Brothers in Rhythm	5:12
7.	"Holding Back the Tears" (lead vocals: Barlow)		Brothers in Rhythm; Barlow	5:29
8.	"Every Guy" (lead vocals: Barlow, Williams)		Brothers in Rhythm; Barlow	3:59
9.	"Love Ain't Here Anymore" (US version) (lead vocals: Barlow)		Porter	4:04
10.	"The Day After Tomorrow" (lead vocals: Owen)		Porter; Barlow	4:53

== Personnel ==
- Steve Anderson – keyboards, bass, drums
- Gary Barlow – vocals, songwriter, producer, programmer
- Greg Bone – guitar
- Brothers in Rhythm – producer
- Chris Cameron – programmer
- Howard Donald – vocals, songwriter
- Mathew Donaldson – photographer
- Andy Duncan – percussion
- Steve McNichol – assistant engineer
- Richard Niles – strings, brass
- Tessa Niles – additional vocals
- Neil Oldfield – guitar
- Jason Orange – vocals
- Mark Owen – vocals, songwriter
- Phil Palmer – guitar
- Morgan Penn – art direction
- Chris Porter – producer
- Tom O'Sullivan – photographer
- Robert Walker – photographer
- Tim Weidner – programmer
- Robbie Williams – vocals, songwriter
- Paul Wright – engineer

== Charts ==
=== Weekly charts ===
Weekly chart performance for Nobody Else
Chart (1995)	Peak position
Argentine Albums (CAPIF)	5
Australian Albums (ARIA)	2
Austrian Albums (Ö3 Austria)	1
Belgian Albums (Ultratop Flanders)	1
Belgian Albums (Ultratop Wallonia)	2
Canadian Albums (RPM)	23
Chilean Albums (IFPI)	4
Danish Albums (Tracklisten)	3
Dutch Albums (Album Top 100)	1
Estonian Albums (Eesti Top 10)	3
European Albums Chart	1
Finnish Albums (Suomen virallinen lista)	1
French Albums (SNEP)	13
German Albums (Offizielle Top 100)	1
Greek Albums (IFPI Greece)	1
Hungarian Albums (MAHASZ)	5
Icelandic Albums (Tonlist)	6
Irish Albums (IRMA)	1
Italian Albums (FIMI)	1
Italian Albums (Musica e Dischi)	1
Japanese Albums (Oricon)	6
New Zealand Albums (RIANZ)	21
Norwegian Albums (VG-lista)	4
Portuguese Albums (AFP)	7
Scottish Albums (OCC)	1
Spanish Albums (PROMUSICAE)	2
Swedish Albums (Sverigetopplistan)	7
Swiss Albums (Schweizer Hitparade)	1
UK Albums (OCC)	1
UK Albums (OCC) (US version import)	26
US Billboard 200	69
US Billboard Heatseekers Chart	1
US Cash Box Top 100 Albums	80
Zimbabwean Albums (ZIMA)	8

Chart (2025)	Peak position
Scottish Albums (OCC)	10
UK Albums (OCC)	91
UK Album Sales (OCC)	8
UK Album Downloads Chart (OCC)	51
UK Physical Albums (OCC)	8
UK Vinyl Albums Chart (OCC)	7

=== Year-end charts ===
1995 year-end chart performance for Nobody Else
Chart (1995)	Position
Australian Albums (ARIA)	79
Austrian Albums (Ö3 Austria)	21
Belgian Albums (Ultratop Flanders)	28
Belgian Albums (Ultratop Wallonia)	21
Dutch Albums (Album Top 100)	43
European Albums (Eurochart Hot 100)	14
German Albums (Offizielle Top 100)	14
Italian Albums (Musica e dischi)	9
Norwegian Albums Russetid Period (VG-Lista)	15
Spanish Albums (AFYVE)	44
Swiss Albums (Schweizer Hitparade)	16
UK Albums Chart (OCC)	17

== Certifications and sales ==
Certifications and sales for Nobody Else
Region	Certification	Certified units/sales
Australia (ARIA)	Gold	50,000
Austria (IFPI Austria)	Gold	25,000^{*}
Belgium (BRMA)	Gold	25,000^{*}
Canada (Music Canada)	Platinum	100,000^{^}
Chile	—	20,000
Germany (BVMI)	Platinum	500,000
Hong Kong (IFPI Hong Kong)	2× Platinum	50,000
Indonesia	—	50,000
Italy (FIMI)	5× Platinum	500,000
Japan (RIAJ)	Gold	175,000
Netherlands (NVPI)	Gold	50,000^{^}
Singapore	—	15,000
South Korea	—	50,000
Spain (Promusicae)	Gold	50,000^{^}
Sweden (GLF)	Gold	50,000^{^}
Switzerland (IFPI Switzerland)	Gold	25,000^{^}
Taiwan (RIT)	3× Platinum	100,000
United Kingdom (BPI)	2× Platinum	680,000
United States	—	288,000
Summaries
Europe (IFPI)	3× Platinum	3,000,000^{*}
^{*} Sales figures based on certification alone.^{^} Shipments figures based on certification alone.
