= Jim Kenworth =

English playwright

- Born: England
- Occupation: Playwright

Jim Kenworth is an English playwright.

== Career ==
Kenworth made his debut as a playwright with the premiere of Johnny Song at the Warehouse Theatre, Croydon in 1998. His second play, Gob, was presented at The King's Head Theatre, Islington, in 1999, and starred Jason Orange of Take That. The play gained positive reviews from Time Out and What's On Critics Choice. Gob was next seen at the 2003 Edinburgh Festival Fringe and earned the distinction of two five-star reviews from Three Weeks and The List, and was included in the feature "Editor's Highlights of the Fringe". Gob was then presented at the Courtyard Theatre, Kings Cross, and ran successfully for four weeks. The play was also produced by Harrogate Theatre as part of their Festival of New Performance and directed by Steve Ansell.

Kenworth had a sell-out reading of his play Polar Bears at The Soho Theatre in 2003 with a cast that fused stand-up comics and theatre actors. Harrogate Theatre produced Polar Bears as part of their Write on 2005 New Writing Festival. The production was directed by Steve Ansell. The play was also performed at the Underbelly at the 2006 Edinburgh Festival Fringe.

Office Guerrillas was selected to perform at Hampstead Theatre Start Nights. The play was specially commended by The Literacy Consultancy in their TLC Scriptwriting competition and awarded a free professional critique. In September 2005 Kenworth had a double-bill script-in-hand performance of Office Guerrillas and Don't Kill The Critic at RADA. He returned to RADA in May 2006 with a reading of his new play Pig. In 2007 Pig was performed by Foundation students of E15 Drama School.
