= Love Ain't Here Anymore =

1994 single by Take That

- UK CD1

Single by Take That

from the album Everything Changes
- B-side: "The Party Remix"
- Released: 27 June 1994
- Genre: Pop
- Length: 3:57
- Label: RCA; BMG
- Songwriter: Gary Barlow
- Producers: Steve Jervier; Paul Jervier; Jonathan Wales

Take That singles chronology
| "Everything Changes" (1994) | "Love Ain't Here Anymore" (1994) | "Sure" (1994) |

Music video
- "Love Ain't Here Anymore" on YouTube

"Love Ain't Here Anymore" is a song by English boy band Take That. Released on 27 June 1994 by RCA and BMG, it was the sixth and final single taken from the band's second studio album, Everything Changes (1993). The song peaked at number three in the UK Singles Chart, ending their string of consecutive number-one singles. This single placing, however, meant the parent album holds the UK record for the number of top 10 singles for a group from one album. "Love Ain't Here Anymore" was re-recorded for release in the United States and included on their first Greatest Hits compilation in 1996.

Take That also recorded a Spanish version of the song, "No si aqui no hay amor", which entered the Spanish AFYVE chart at number two. It appears as a B-side to Take That's following single, "Sure", while the English version appears on the United States single of "Back for Good". "Love Ain't Here Anymore" has received a silver sales status certification for sales of over 200,000 copies in the UK. A new, re-recorded version of the song appears as a track on the group's 2018 compilation album Odyssey, featuring vocals from US singing group Boyz II Men.

== Critical reception ==
Peter Fawthrop from AllMusic complimented the song as a "quality ballad". A reviewer from Music & Media wrote, "Teenage girls can't play with dolls all the time. Actually they're in for a bit of romance too, and dreams about future loves are given some contours by Take That's sophisticated ballad." Alan Jones from Music Week gave it a top score of five out of five and named it Pick of the Week, stating, "With this warm and tender ballad, Take That are set to become the third act to have five chart-toppers inside a 12-month period, following in the illustrious footsteps of Elvis Presley and the Beatles." In a retrospective review, Pop Rescue commented, "Turn the lights down for 'Love Ain't Here Anymore', with Gary singing his regrets out". It was also described as "a mid-tempo ballad, with soaring strings that fit perfectly with the vocal range of the group". Emma Cochrane from Smash Hits gave it four out of five, naming it a "classy ballad".

== Music video ==
A music video was produced to promote the single. It shows the band performing the song in what appears to be a recording studio. Lighting effects are used to make the video more complex and appealing showing silhouettes of the band.

== Track listings ==
"Rock 'n' Roll Medley" contains versions of "Great Balls of Fire", "Under the Moon of Love", "(Let Me Be Your) Teddy Bear", and "Born to Hand Jive".

- UK CD1 and Japanese CD single
1. "Love Ain't Here Anymore" – 3:48
2. "The Party Remix" – 7:13
3. "Another Crack in My Heart" (live) – 3:02
4. "Everything Changes" (live Top of the Pops satellite performance) – 4:25
- UK CD2
1. "Love Ain't Here Anymore" (live at Berlin Deutschlandhalle)
2. "Rock 'n' Roll Medley" (live at Berlin Deutschlandhalle)
3. "Wasting My Time" (live at Berlin Deutschlandhalle)
4. "Babe" (live at Berlin Deutschlandhalle)
- UK cassette single 1
1. "Love Ain't Here Anymore"
2. "The Party Remix"
3. "Everything Changes" (live Top of the Pops satellite performance)
- UK cassette single 2
1. "Love Ain't Here Anymore" (live at Berlin Deutschlandhalle)
2. "Rock 'n' Roll Medley" (live at Berlin Deutschlandhalle)
3. "Babe" (live at Berlin Deutschlandhalle)
- European CD single
1. "Love Ain't Here Anymore"
2. "The Party Remix"
- Australasian CD single
1. "Love Ain't Here Anymore"
2. "The Party Remix"
3. "Babe" (live at Berlin Deutschlandhalle)
- Spanish CD single
1. "No si aqui no hay amor"
2. "The Party Remix"
3. "Love Ain't Here Anymore"
4. "Babe" (live at Berlin Deutschlandhalle)
- Spanish 12-inch single
1. "No si aqui no hay amor" – 3:54
2. "The Party Remix" – 7:25
3. "Love Ain't Here Anymore" – 3:51
4. "Babe" (live at Berlin Deutschlandhalle) – 6:24
5. "Rock 'n' Roll Medley" (live at Berlin Deutschlandhalle) – 6:37

== Personnel ==
- Gary Barlow – lead vocals
- Howard Donald – backing vocals
- Jason Orange – backing vocals
- Mark Owen – backing vocals
- Robbie Williams – backing vocals

== Charts ==
=== Weekly charts ===
| Chart (1994) | Peak position |
|---|---|
| Australia (ARIA) | 38 |
| Belgium (Ultratop 50 Flanders) | 25 |
| Denmark (IFPI) | 6 |
| Europe (Eurochart Hot 100) | 5 |
| Europe (European AC Radio) | 11 |
| Europe (European Hit Radio) | 10 |
| Europe (Channel Crossovers) | 4 |
| Finland (Suomen virallinen lista) | 9 |
| Germany (GfK) | 39 |
| Greece (IFPI Greece) | 7 |
| Iceland (Íslenski Listinn Topp 40) | 27 |
| Ireland (IRMA) | 4 |
| Israel (Israeli Singles Chart) | 9 |
| Lithuania (M-1) | 1 |
| Netherlands (Dutch Top 40) | 23 |
| Netherlands (Single Top 100) | 24 |
| Scottish Singles Sales (Official Charts) | 2 |
| Spain (AFYVE) "No si aqui no hay amor" | 2 |
| UK Singles (Official Charts) | 3 |
| UK Airplay (Music Week) | 8 |

=== Year-end charts ===
| Chart (1994) | Position |
|---|---|
| UK Singles (OCC) | 52 |

== Certifications ==
| Region | Certification | Certified units/sales |
|---|---|---|
| United Kingdom (BPI) | Silver | 200,000^{^} |
^{^} Shipments figures based on certification alone.

== Release history ==
| Region | Date | Format(s) | Label(s) | Ref. |
|---|---|---|---|---|
| United Kingdom | 27 June 1994 | CD; cassette | RCA; BMG | |
| Japan | 21 July 1994 | CD | RCA; BMG | |
| Australia | 19 September 1994 | CD; cassette | RCA; BMG | |
