= Everything Changes (Take That song) =

1994 single by Take That

Single by Take That

from the album Everything Changes
- B-side: "Beatles Medley"
- Released: 28 March 1994
- Genre: Disco; Philly soul
- Length: 3:34
- Label: RCA; BMG
- Songwriters: Gary Barlow; Michael Ward; Eliot Kennedy; Cary Baylis
- Producers: Michael Ward; Eliot Kennedy; Cary Baylis

Take That singles chronology
"Babe" (1993)	"Everything Changes" (1994)	"Love Ain't Here Anymore" (1994)

Music video
- "Everything Changes" on YouTube

"Everything Changes" is a song by English boy band Take That, released in March 1994 as the fifth single from the band's second studio album, Everything Changes (1993). It was written by band member Gary Barlow with the producers, Michael Ward, Eliot Kennedy and Cary Bayliss. The song features Robbie Williams on lead vocals and became Take That's fourth consecutive single to enter at number one on the UK Singles Chart, where it remained for two weeks. Thereby becoming the first group ever to have four consecutive singles debut at number one, and the first to take four number one hits off one album.

It sold 400,000 copies in the UK and has received a gold certification from the British Phonographic Industry (BPI). The accompanying music video featured the band performing in a jazz cafe. "Everything Changes" was nominated for Best Single at the 1994 Smash Hits Awards but lost to their single "Sure".

== Critical reception ==
Tom Ewing of Freaky Trigger described "Everything Changes" as "breezy" and "disco-inspired", noting that "this is the first number one with lead vocals from Robbie Williams." In his weekly UK chart commentary, James Masterton declared it as "a pop-tinged slice of 70s disco soul". Pan-European magazine Music & Media commented, "Philly soul is what the "fab five" exercise on the title track off their current album." Alan Jones from Music Week gave it a top score of five out of five, writing, "The glossy but insubstantial title track of the boys' double platinum album has a good chance of becoming their fourth consecutive number one".

Mark Sutherland from Smash Hits also gave it four out of five, writing, "If truth be told, the fifth single from the album isn't the 'That at their best. Sung by Rob, it trips along merrily enough and is the proud owner of an extremely perky chorus, but it isn't a patch on 'Pray' or 'Babe'." In a retrospective review, Pop Rescue remarked that Williams opens the song "with some sultry reassurance before it opens out into a bouncy little pop song", adding that "at times, this song feels somewhat Stock/Aitken/Waterman".

== Music video ==
The accompanying music video for the song, liberally based on Kylie Minogue's video for her single "Give Me Just a Little More Time" (shot in the same location, two years earlier, in sepia tone), shows the band in a jazz cafe performing the song with people in the cafe joining in. The video uses the 7-inch mix, which removes Williams' spoken intro from the album version that says "Girl, come over here, let me hold you for a little while and remember I'll always love you." The 7-inch mix also appears on their Greatest Hits album. "Everything Changes" was a Box Top on British music television channel The Box in May 1994. Same month, it received heavy rotation on MTV Europe and was A-listed on Germany's VIVA.

== Track listings ==
The B-side of the single features a studio version of a medley of songs by the Beatles, which the band performed live in concerts. The songs included are "I Want to Hold Your Hand", "A Hard Day's Night" and "She Loves You".

- UK and European 7-inch and cassette single; Japanese mini-CD single
1. "Everything Changes"
2. "Beatles Medley"
- UK CD single
1. "Everything Changes"
2. "Beatles Medley"
3. "Everything Changes" (Nigel Lowis remix)
4. "Everything Changes" (extended version)
- UK CD digipak single
1. "Everything Changes" (Nigel Lowis remix)
2. "Interview"
3. "Relight My Fire" (live at Wembley Arena)
- German CD single
1. "Everything Changes" – 3:35
2. "Relight My Fire" (live at Wembley Arena) – 8:07
3. "Beatles Medley" – 3:39
4. "Interview" – 4:26
- European CD single
1. "Everything Changes" – 3:33
2. "Relight My Fire" (live at Wembley Arena) – 8:07
- Australasian CD single
1. "Everything Changes"
2. "Beatles Medley"
3. "Everything Changes" (Nigel Lowis remix)
4. "Everything Changes" (extended version)
5. "Interview"
- Japanese CD single
1. "Everything Changes"
2. "Beatles Medley"
3. "Everything Changes" (Nigel Lowis remix)
4. "Everything Changes" (extended version)
5. "Interview"
6. "Relight My Fire" (live at Wembley Arena)

== Personnel ==
- Robbie Williams – lead vocals
- Gary Barlow – backing vocals
- Howard Donald – backing vocals
- Jason Orange – backing vocals
- Mark Owen – backing vocals

== Charts ==
=== Weekly charts ===
Chart (1994)	Peak position
Australia (ARIA)	58
Austria (Ö3 Austria Top 40)	26
Belgium (Ultratop 50 Flanders)	8
Belgium (Ultratop 50 Wallonia)	9
Denmark (Tracklisten)	4
Europe (Eurochart Hot 100)	6
Europe (European AC Radio)	7
Europe (European Hit Radio)	5
Europe (Channel Crossovers)	1
Finland (Suomen virallinen lista)	11
Germany (GfK)	17
Greece (IFPI Greece)	4
Iceland (Íslenski Listinn Topp 40)	35
Ireland (IRMA)	2
Israel (Israeli Singles Chart)	9
Latvia (Latvijas Top 40)	3
Lithuania (M-1)	6
Netherlands (Dutch Top 40)	6
Netherlands (Single Top 100)	7
Scottish Singles Sales (Official Charts)	1
Singapore (SPVA)	1
Spain Airplay (Top 40 Radio)	38
Switzerland (Schweizer Hitparade)	22
UK Singles (Official Charts)	1
UK Airplay (Music Week)	2

=== Year-end charts ===
Chart (1994)	Position
Belgium (Ultratop 50 Flanders)	60
Europe (Eurochart Hot 100)	69
Europe (Channel Crossovers)	15
Latvia (Latvijas Top 40)	34
Netherlands (Dutch Top 40)	83
Netherlands (Single Top 100)	93
UK Singles (OCC)	20
UK Airplay (Music Week)	45

=== Decade-end charts ===
Chart (1990–1999)	Position
Ireland (IRMA)	51

== Certifications ==
Region	Certification	Certified units/sales
United Kingdom (BPI)	Gold	400,000^{‡}
^{‡} Sales+streaming figures based on certification alone.

== Release history ==
Region	Date	Format(s)	Label(s)	Ref(s).
United Kingdom	28 March 1994	7-inch vinyl; CD1; cassette	RCA; BMG	
United Kingdom	5 April 1994	CD2	RCA; BMG	
Japan	21 May 1994	CD; mini-CD	RCA; BMG	
Australia	18 July 1994	CD; cassette	RCA; BMG	

== Usage in media ==
In the Derry Girls episode "The Concert", the girls attend a Take That concert. Footage from a real gig was used, in which the band sang "Everything Changes".

== See also ==
- List of UK Singles Chart number ones of the 1990s
