= Never Forget (Take That song) =

1995 single by Take That

- UK CD single 1 cover

Single by Take That

from the album Nobody Else
- Released: 24 July 1995
- Genre: Pop; soul
- Length: 5:12 (album version); 6:24 (single mix)
- Label: RCA; BMG
- Songwriter: Gary Barlow
- Producers: Brothers in Rhythm; Dave James; Jim Steinman (remix)

Take That singles chronology
"Back for Good" (1995)	"Never Forget" (1995)	"How Deep Is Your Love" (1996)

Alternative cover
- UK CD single 2 cover

Alternative cover
- UK promo CD single cover

Music video
- "Never Forget" on YouTube

"Never Forget" is a song recorded by English boy band Take That, included as the sixth track on their third studio album, Nobody Else (1995). Written by Gary Barlow and produced by Brothers in Rhythm and Dave James, it features Howard Donald on lead vocals.

A remixed version of the song produced by Jim Steinman was released as a single on 24 July 1995 by RCA and BMG and became the band's seventh number one on the UK Singles Chart, remaining at number one for three weeks. Robbie Williams left the band during the promotion of the song.

== Song information ==
The song was written by Gary Barlow and sung mostly by Howard Donald. Robbie Williams has a short solo section in the middle of the song and his vocals are also featured before the final chorus. There is also a remix with Barlow having a solo part after Williams' part, but this remix remains unreleased. In addition to Williams, Jason Orange, Mark Owen, and Barlow all have parts in the song.

Courtesy of a remix by producer Jim Steinman, the single version contains heavier, more robust instrumentation, with brass arrangements and additional vocals from the Henllan Boys Choir, led by Ally Stubbs. It also features a short instrumental intro taken from the Tuba mirum of Verdi's Requiem. Steinman had been chosen due to his work on Meat Loaf's Bat Out of Hell, an album Barlow's brother owned and listened to frequently. Barlow attended the overdubbing sessions in New York, which were followed by the recording of Celine Dion's version of "It's All Coming Back to Me Now". The single mix was premiered on Simon Mayo's Radio 1 show on 3 July 1995.

The song was mimed by the leading characters in the series finale in the fourth series of Shameless and used in 2006 for the "Take That: The Ultimate Tour" finale. Currently the track has sold over 600,000 copies in the UK and received a Platinum certification.

"Sunday to Saturday" was issued as a single in Japan instead of "Never Forget" and reached number nine. However, "Never Forget" still managed to chart in the lower sections of its singles chart.

== Critical reception ==
In his weekly UK chart commentary for Dotmusic, James Masterton found that what has transformed "a rather weedy-sounding album track" into "a bombastic masterpiece" is the credit on the sleeve which indicates the remixing presence on the track of one Jim Steinman. Pan-European magazine Music & Media said, "Exit Robbie, welcome to the now fab four. Recorded before his departure, the title and the lyrics seem almost to have anticipated his announcement. Jim Steinman's trademark bombastic production underlines the drama." A reviewer from Music Week commented, "The likes of Clive Griffin, Katie Kissoon and Jimmy Ruffin's son Jayray provide the choral backing for this slinky, rousing pop track that grows with a piano and strings accompaniment before a great hand clapping finale." In a separate single review, Music Week rated it four out of five, adding, "A fanfare and a heavenly choir precede this strong gospel tinged number with Howard Donald on lead vocals. It should see the boys grabbing the top spot once more." Paul Moody from NME felt that "Never Forget" "could almost be the work of Meat himself, so lacking in subtlety is it. There's a choir in the intro for a kick off, plenty of self-referential angst from Sir Gaz in the lyric about never forgetting the fans'n'stuff, and an overblown delivery from wolfman Howard to top it off. Fab!"

Some have noticed similarities between the track's chorus and that of Smokey Robinson's 1965 "Tracks of My Tears". The link to Robinson is also shown in a duet between Barlow and Robinson which features on the 2014 album Smokey & Friends.

In 2018, "Never Forget" was included in American Billboard magazine's list of the "100 Greatest Boyband Songs of All Time".

== Music video ==
The accompanying music video for the song was directed by David Amphlett. It is a montage of childhood moments of Take That caught on camera and features photographs of the members as children. Most of the footage is taken from the band performing live, backstage at gigs or on tour. Other moments such as the band meeting then-Prince Charles and TV appearances are also shown. "Never Forget" won Best Video at the 1995 Smash Hits Awards.

== Live performances ==
In the original recording of the song, Robbie Williams had a solo section near the end. When the group reformed in 2006 without him, the first part of Williams' section was sometimes sung by whoever was supporting the band on tour. The second half was sung by Mark Owen. After Williams rejoined the group in 2010, the song was performed live by all five members for the first time on the BBC's Children in Need on 19 November 2010. In 2008, Eoghan Quigg performed a cover of this song on The X Factor and it featured on his critically panned self-titled album, released on 6 April 2009. Critics considered it the worst moment on the album. The following year it was performed by the final twelve during the final group performance of series 6. It was also performed at the beginning of The X Factor Final 2010 featuring finalists Matt Cardle, Rebecca Ferguson and One Direction, and joined by Take That on stage.

Williams also performed the song solo, on the Take the Crown Stadium Tour in 2013. When playing at Wembley Stadium, he replaced the lyric "Someday this will all be someone else's dream" with "this will be Justin Bieber's dream..." and continued, "I don't think so! He's a good singer and he's got a lovely haircut... I should shut up now before I get into too much trouble," to thunderous applause from the audience.

Williams performed the song on his 2017 stadium tour The Heavy Entertainment Show Tour.

The song's chorus is played during rugby games at Twickenham Stadium when England score a penalty kick or conversion.

On 25 March 2017, the three remaining members of Take That performed "Never Forget" with Ant & Dec as the final song of a medley during the "End of the Show Show" on Ant & Dec's Saturday Night Takeaway.

At the Coronation Concert for King Charles III and Queen Camilla, Take That performed the song as a three-piece to close the concert, with military bands supporting on trumpets and drums. The opening was performed by the St. George's Chapel choristers. Following this performance the song peaked at number four on the LyricFind Global and number seven on the LyricFind U.S charts compiled by Billboard.

== Track listings ==
- UK CD single 1 (74321 29956 2)
1. "Never Forget" (radio edit) – 5:32
2. "Back for Good" (live From MTV's Most Wanted) – 4:10
3. "Babe" (live from MTV's Most Wanted) – 4:41
- UK CD single 2 (74321 29957 2)
1. "Never Forget" (single mix) – 6:24
2. "Pray" (live from MTV's Most Wanted) / Interview – 17:36
- European CD single 1 (74321 29842 2)
1. "Never Forget" (radio edit) – 5:32
2. "Back for Good" (live from MTV's Most Wanted) – 4:10
- European CD single 2 (74321 29843 2)
1. "Never Forget" (radio edit) – 5:32
2. "Back for Good" (live from MTV's "Most Wanted) – 4:10
3. "Pray" (live from MTV's Most Wanted) / Interview – 17:36
- Japanese CD single (BVCP 1302)
1. "Sunday to Saturday" – 5:03
2. "Back for Good" (live from MTV's Most Wanted) – 4:10
3. "Babe" (live from MTV's Most Wanted) – 4:41
4. "Pray" (live from MTV's Most Wanted) / Interview – 17:36
- UK cassette single (74321 29959 2)
1. "Never Forget" (radio edit) – 5:32
2. "Back for Good" (live from MTV's Most Wanted) – 4:10

== Charts ==
=== Weekly charts ===
Chart (1995)	Peak position
Australia (ARIA)	12
Austria (Ö3 Austria Top 40)	17
Belgium (Ultratop 50 Flanders)	8
Belgium (Ultratop 50 Wallonia)	5
Denmark (Tracklisten)	3
Europe (Eurochart Hot 100)	3
Europe (European AC Radio)	3
Europe (European Dance Radio)	21
Europe (European Hit Radio)	2
Europe (Channel Crossovers)	1
Finland (Suomen virallinen lista)	5
France (SNEP)	44
France Airplay (SNEP)	6
Germany (Media Control AG)	10
Greece (IFPI Greece)	5
Holland Airplay (Music & Media)	2
Hungary (Mahasz)	11
Iceland (Íslenski Listinn Topp 40)	31
Ireland (IRMA)	1
Israel (Israeli Singles Chart)	2
Italy (Musica e dischi)	8
Italy Airplay (Music & Media)	4
Japan (Oricon)	96
Latvia (Latvijas Top 40)	1
Lithuania (M-1)	1
Netherlands (Dutch Top 40)	7
Netherlands (Single Top 100)	8
Norway (VG-lista)	14
Poland Airplay (Music & Media)	18
Scottish Singles Sales (Official Charts)	1
Spain (AFYVE)	1
Spain Airplay (Top 40 Radio)	7
Sweden (Sverigetopplistan)	34
Switzerland (Schweizer Hitparade)	6
UK Singles (Official Charts)	1
UK Airplay (Music Week)	2
Zimbabwe (ZIMA)	9

Chart (2008)	Peak position
UK Singles (Official Charts)	64

Chart (2023)	Peak position
Global LyricFind Songs (Billboard)	4
UK Singles Downloads (Official Charts)	14
UK Singles Sales (OCC)	16
US LyricFind Songs (Billboard)	7

=== Year-end charts ===
Chart (1995)	Position
Australia (ARIA)	84
Belgium (Ultratop 50 Flanders)	74
Belgium (Ultratop 50 Wallonia)	33
Europe (Eurochart Hot 100)	49
Europe (European AC Radio)	23
Europe (European Hit Radio)	19
Europe (Channel Crossovers)	9
Germany (Media Control)	74
Israel (Israeli Singles Chart)	18
Italy (Musica e dischi)	55
Italy Airplay (Music & Media)	17
Latvia (Latvijas Top 40)	7
Netherlands (Dutch Top 40)	105
Netherlands (Single Top 100)	54
Switzerland (Schweizer Hitparade)	50
UK Singles (OCC)	25

== Certifications ==
Region	Certification	Certified units/sales
United Kingdom (BPI)	Platinum	600,000^{‡}
^{‡} Sales+streaming figures based on certification alone.

== Release history ==
Region	Date	Format(s)	Label(s)	Ref.
United Kingdom	24 July 1995	CD; cassette	RCA; BMG	
Australia	7 August 1995	CD	RCA; BMG	

== See also ==
- "The Official BBC Children in Need Medley"
