= Everything Changes (Take That album) =

Studio album by Take That
- Released: 11 October 1993
- Recorded: 1992–1993
- Genre: Pop
- Length: 50:58
- Labels: RCA; BMG
- Producers: Andrew Livingstone; David James; Eliot Kennedy; Joey Negro; Jonathan Wales; Mike Ward; Nigel Wright; Paul Jervier; Steve Jervier; The Rapino Brothers

Take That chronology
Take That & Party (1992)	Everything Changes (1993)	Nobody Else (1995)

Alternative cover
- Japanese cover

Singles from Everything Changes
- 1. "Why Can't I Wake Up with You" Released: 20 February 1993; 2. "Pray" Released: 5 July 1993; 3. "Relight My Fire" Released: 27 September 1993; 4. "Babe" Released: 13 December 1993; 5. "Everything Changes" Released: 28 March 1994; 6. "Love Ain't Here Anymore" Released: 17 May 1994

Professional ratings
Review scores
Source	Rating
AllMusic	4.5/5 stars
Encyclopedia of Popular Music	3/5 stars
Music Week	5/5 stars
Smash Hits	5/5 stars

Everything Changes is the second studio album by English boy band Take That. It reached number one in the UK Albums Chart, and was nominated for the 1994 Mercury Prize. It was also the fourth best-selling album of 1993 in the UK.

The album was also the band's breakthrough across Europe going top 10 in many countries and top 30 in Australia and Japan.

The album has been certified as 4× Platinum in the UK and stayed in the top 75 of the UK Albums Chart for 78 weeks (a year and six months). The album also holds the UK record for the number of top 10 singles for a group from one album. "Everything Changes" won Best Album at the 1993 Smash Hits Awards.

As of August 1995, the album had sold 3 million copies worldwide according to Billboard.

== Track listings ==
All tracks are written by Gary Barlow, except where noted.

No.	Title	Writer(s)	Producer(s)	Length
1.	"Everything Changes" (lead vocals: Williams)	Gary Barlow; Michael Ward; Eliot Kennedy; Cary Baylis	Ward; Kennedy; Baylis^{[a]}	3:34
2.	"Pray" (lead vocals: Barlow)		Steve Jervier; Paul Jervier; Jonathan Wales; Mark Beswick^{[b]}	3:43
3.	"Wasting My Time" (lead vocals: Barlow)		Ward; Kennedy; Baylis^{[a]}	3:45
4.	"Relight My Fire" (lead vocals: Barlow featuring Lulu)	Dan Hartman	Joey Negro; Andrew Livingstone; Beswick^{[b]}	4:11
5.	"Love Ain't Here Anymore" (lead vocals: Barlow)		S. Jervier; P. Jervier; Wales; Beswick^{[b]}	3:57
6.	"If This Is Love" (lead vocals: Donald)	Howard Donald; Dave James	James	3:56
7.	"Whatever You Do to Me" (lead vocals: Barlow)		Ward; Kennedy; Barlow^{[c]}; Baylis^{[a]}	3:44
8.	"Meaning of Love" (lead vocals: Barlow)		Negro; Livingstone	3:47
9.	"Why Can't I Wake Up with You" (lead vocals: Barlow)		S. Jervier; P. Jervier; Wales; Beswick^{[b]}	3:37
10.	"You Are the One" (lead vocals: Barlow)		The Rapino Brothers	3:47
11.	"Another Crack in My Heart" (lead vocals: Barlow)		The Rapino Brothers	4:13
12.	"Broken Your Heart" (lead vocals: Barlow)		Nigel Wright	3:46
13.	"Babe" (lead vocals: Owen)		S. Jervier; P. Jervier; Wales; Beswick^{[b]}	4:51

Japanese bonus track
No.	Title	Producer(s)	Length
14.	"All I Want Is You" (lead vocals: Williams)	The Rapino Brothers	3:21

2006 expanded edition bonus tracks
No.	Title	Writer(s)	Producer(s)	Length
14.	"No Si Aqui No Hay Amor" (lead vocals: Barlow)	Barlow; Alberto Comesaña	S. Jervier; P. Jervier; Wales; Beswick^{[b]}; Barlow^{[b]}	3:55
15.	"The Party Remix" ("Relight My Fire"/"Could It Be Magic"/"It Only Takes a Minute"/"Everything Changes")	Hartman; Adrienne Anderson; Barry Manilow; Dennis Lambert; Brian Potter; Barlow; Ward; Baylis; Kennedy	Bizzie Bee	7:16
16.	"All I Want Is You" (lead vocals: Barlow)		The Rapino Brothers	3:21
17.	"Babe" (return mix)		S. Jervier; P. Jervier; Wales; Beswick^{[b]}; Chris Porter^{[a]}; Dave Clayton^{[a]}	4:55

Notes

- ^{^[a]} signifies an additional producer
- ^{^[b]} signifies an additional vocal producer
- ^{^[c]} signifies a co-producer

== Personnel ==
- Gary Barlow – vocals, songwriting
- Howard Donald – vocals, songwriting
- Jason Orange – vocals
- Mark Owen – vocals
- Robbie Williams – vocals
- Alan Fisch – engineer
- Pete Craigie – engineer
- Pete Stewart – engineer
- Eliot Kennedy – mixer
- Dean Freeman – photographer
- Eliot Kennedy – producer
- Jonathan Wales – producer
- Mike Ward – producer
- Paul Jervier – producer
- Steve Jervier – producer
- Mark Beswick – additional vocals
- Cary Baylis – guitar
- David Russell Lee – producer

== Charts ==
=== Weekly charts ===
Weekly chart performance for Everything Changes
Chart (1993–1994)	Peak position
Australian Albums (ARIA)	24
Austrian Albums (Ö3 Austria)	7
Belgian Albums (Ultratop Flanders)	6
Belgian Albums (Ultratop Wallonia)	7
Danish Albums (Tracklisten)	6
Dutch Albums (Album Top 100)	3
European Albums Chart	5
Finnish Albums (Suomen virallinen lista)	2
German Albums (Offizielle Top 100)	4
Greek Albums (IFPI Greece)	2
Hungarian Albums (MAHASZ)	5
Irish Albums (IRMA)	4
Italian Albums (FIMI) (February 1995 chart inception)	13
Italian Albums (Musica e Dischi)	17
Japanese Albums (Oricon)	25
Scottish Albums (OCC) (March 1994 chart inception)	16
Swedish Albums (Sverigetopplistan)	27
Swiss Albums (Schweizer Hitparade)	9
UK Albums (Official Charts)	1

Chart (2024)	Peak position
Scottish Albums (OCC)	15
UK Album Sales (OCC)	10
UK Physical Albums (OCC)	9
UK Record Store Chart (OCC)	37
UK Vinyl Albums Chart (OCC)	5

=== Year-end charts ===
1993 year-end chart performance for Everything Changes
Chart (1993)	Rank
Europe (Eurochart Hot 100)	90
UK Albums (OCC)	4

1994 year-end chart performance for Everything Changes
Chart (1994)	Rank
Austrian Albums (Ö3 Austria)	26
Dutch Albums (MegaCharts)	15
Europe (Eurochart Hot 100)	10
German Albums (Offizielle Top 100)	11
Italian Albums (Musica e dischi)	85
Swiss Albums (Schweizer Hitparade)	12
UK Albums (OCC)	22

1995 year-end chart performance for Everything Changes
Chart (1995)	Rank
Dutch Albums (MegaCharts)	91

=== Decade-end charts ===
Decade-end chart performance for Everything Changes
Chart (1990–1999)	Position
UK Albums (OCC)	62

== Certifications and sales ==
Certifications and sales for Everything Changes
Region	Certification	Certified units/sales
Austria (IFPI Austria)	Gold	25,000^{*}
Belgium (BRMA)	Platinum	50,000^{*}
Finland (Musiikkituottajat)	Gold	28,260
Germany (BVMI)	Platinum	500,000^{^}
Italy (FIMI)	Platinum	100,000
Netherlands (NVPI)	Platinum	100,000^{^}
South Korea	—	50,000
Sweden (GLF)	Gold	50,000^{^}
Switzerland (IFPI Switzerland)	Platinum	50,000^{^}
United Kingdom (BPI)	4× Platinum	1,300,000
Summaries
Worldwide as of August 1995	—	3,000,000
^{*} Sales figures based on certification alone.^{^} Shipments figures based on certification alone.
