= The Rapino Brothers =

Record producers

The Rapino Brothers are record producers Charlie Mallozzi and Marco Sabiu, known for their work during the 1990s with artists such as Take That, Kylie Minogue, Dannii Minogue, Paola e Chiara, Valerio Scanu, and Primal Scream. Italian Eurodance group Corona's 1993 song "The Rhythm of the Night", was also worked on by The Rapino Brothers before being released as a single in the UK the following year.

== History ==
Italian-born Charlie Rapino began his career in the music industry in the early 1980s as a lawyer, a path that eventually led to production work for various record companies. In 1987, he started producing house music in Italy with his brother Marco under the name The Rapino Brothers. It was, however, a song that featured Charlie as MC rather than behind the production desk, "Tingo Tango", was to prove a turning point in their career, earning extensive UK radio airplay and a recommendation from Culture Club's Jon Moss for the duo to further their burgeoning profile in London. In May 1992, The Rapino Brothers moved to London to establish themselves as hit pop producers.

By January 1993, the duo had secured their first hit as Rapination, featuring singer Kym Mazelle, with "Love Me the Right Way", when the song peaked at No. 22 on the UK Singles Chart. This was preceded in December 1992 with a remix radio edit of Take That's first top 5 hit, "Could It Be Magic".

Charlie Rapino went on to become an A&R, first at Sony Music International and then at Decca Records.
