= Sure (Take That song) =

1994 single by Take That

- UK CD1 artwork

Single by Take That

from the album Nobody Else
- Released: 3 October 1994
- Genre: Blue-eyed soul; swingbeat; pop; R&B
- Length: 3:42
- Label: RCA; BMG
- Songwriters: Gary Barlow; Mark Owen; Robbie Williams
- Producers: Brothers in Rhythm; Gary Barlow

Take That singles chronology
"Love Ain't Here Anymore" (1994)	"Sure" (1994)	"Back for Good" (1995)

Alternative cover
- UK CD2 artwork

Music video
- "Sure" on YouTube

"Sure" is a single by English boy band Take That, released as the lead single from their third studio album, Nobody Else (1995). It was written by Take That's lead singer Gary Barlow and fellow band members Robbie Williams and Mark Owen. Released on 3 October 1994 by RCA Records and BMG, the song became the band's fifth number one on the UK Singles Chart and has received a silver certification in the United Kingdom for selling over 200,000 copies. Its accompanying music video was directed by Greg Masuak, featuring the band babysitting a young girl. "Sure" won Best Single and Best Pop Video at the 1994 Smash Hits Awards. In 2003, Q Magazine included the song in their list of the "1001 Best Songs Ever".

== Critical reception ==
Chuck Campbell from Knoxville News Sentinel described the song as "slinky" and "hip-hoppish", adding that songs like 'Sure' "are serviceable as updates of British blue-eyed soul". Pan-European magazine Music & Media commented, "International stardom is not enough. Concerns about the credibility factor are the latest craze in teenland. Yet through 'Sure''s hip and raw swingbeat production even Take That enemies will have to give in." Alan Jones from Music Week gave the song a top score of five out of five and named it Pick of the Week, adding that it is "far from their most distinctive track, but this slick piece of synthetic soul balladry has all the ingredients necessary to keep the Take That bandwagon rolling." He concluded, "Clearly one to watch." Leesa Daniels from Smash Hits also gave it a full score of five out of five and described it as "classy", writing, "It's a lot smoother than anything else they've done."

== Release and chart performance ==
The single was released on 3 October 1994. Take That's previous single had stalled at number three on the UK Singles Chart after four consecutive number-one hits, but "Sure" debuted at number one becoming their fifth number-one single. It remained at the top for two weeks but dropped quickly thereafter. It was the 42nd best selling single of 1994 in the UK, the lowest-selling number-one single of the year.

== Music video ==
The music video for "Sure" was directed by Greg Masuak, produced by Phil Barnes for Oil Factory and released in late September 1994. In the video, Take That babysits a little girl like in Three Men and a Baby. It is seven minutes long and somewhat comical. It shows the band preparing for a party in their apartment whilst also babysitting a disruptive 5-year-old little girl named Emily who is halting them from getting ready while her mother is out of town. Gary Barlow is writing a song, Jason Orange is dancing and Mark Owen is preparing food and struggling to deal with Emily throwing her food on the table while answering phone calls about the party. When Robbie Williams returns from grocery shopping, Howard Donald takes the calls in Owen's place. Once Owen is finally able to tuck Emily into bed, the song starts, and many guests arrive for the party. As several couples hook up at the party, the band are seen performing the song in vest nets against a blue backdrop. As the guests leave the party, one girl is left behind and falls asleep in the trashed apartment. The video ends with Emily waking up in the middle of the night to find the band asleep amidst the disarray from the party.

A shorter edited version of the song exists in which music video channels play the video from where the song starts. It was a Box Top on British The Box in October 1994. Later, the video was A-listed on Germany's VIVA and received active rotation on MTV Europe in November 1994. "Sure" also won an award in the category for Best Pop Video at the 1994 Smash Hits Awards.

== Track listings ==
- UK and European CD1 (74321236622)
1. "Sure"
2. "Sure" (Thumpers club mix)
3. "Sure" (Full Pressure mix)
4. "Sure" (Strictly Barking dub)
- UK and European CD2 (74321236632)
1. "Sure" – 3:40
2. "No si aqui no hay amor"
3. "Why Can't I Wake Up with You" (club mix)
4. "You Are the One" (Tonic Mix)
- UK 12-inch single (74321236621)

A1. "Sure" (Thumpers club mix) – 8:21
B1. "Sure" (Brothers in Rhythm mix) – 3:40
B2. "Sure" (Full Pressure mix) – 5:37

- UK cassette single (74321236624)
1. "Sure"
2. "No si aqui no hay amor"

== Personnel ==
- Gary Barlow – lead vocals
- Howard Donald – backing vocals
- Jason Orange – backing vocals
- Mark Owen – backing vocals
- Robbie Williams – backing vocals

== Charts ==
=== Weekly charts ===
Chart (1994–1995)	Peak position
Australia (ARIA)	31
Belgium (Ultratop 50 Flanders)	9
Belgium (Ultratop 50 Wallonia)	5
Denmark (IFPI)	3
Europe (Eurochart Hot 100)	5
Europe (European AC Radio)	11
Europe (European Dance Radio)	10
Europe (European Hit Radio)	5
Europe (Channel Crossovers)	2
Finland (Suomen virallinen lista)	4
France Airplay (SNEP)	74
Germany (GfK)	24
Greece (IFPI Greece)	2
Ireland (IRMA)	3
Israel (Israeli Singles Chart)	14
Italy (Musica e dischi)	4
Japan International (Oricon)	2
Latvia (Latvijas Top 40)	17
Lithuania (M-1)	5
Netherlands (Dutch Top 40)	17
Netherlands (Single Top 100)	15
Scottish Singles Sales (Official Charts)	1
Spain (AFYVE)	17
Spain Airplay (Top 40 Radio)	39
Sweden (Sverigetopplistan)	30
Switzerland (Schweizer Hitparade)	24
UK Singles (Official Charts)	1
UK Airplay (Music Week)	3
UK Club Chart (Music Week)	38

=== Year-end charts ===
Chart (1994)	Position
Belgium (Ultratop 50 Flanders)	87
Europe (Eurochart Hot 100)	63
Italy (Musica e dischi)	7
Netherlands (Dutch Top 40)	160
UK Singles (OCC)	42

== Certifications ==
Region	Certification	Certified units/sales
United Kingdom (BPI)	Silver	200,000^{^}
^{^} Shipments figures based on certification alone.

== Release history ==
Region	Date	Format(s)	Label(s)	Ref.
United Kingdom	3 October 1994	12-inch vinyl; CD; cassette	RCA; BMG	
Australia	14 November 1994	CD; cassette	RCA; BMG	
Japan	23 November 1994	CD	RCA; BMG	
Australia	16 January 1995	VHS	RCA; BMG	
