= Why Can't I Wake Up with You =

1993 single by Take That

Single by Take That

from the album Take That & Party and Everything Changes
- B-side: "A Million Love Songs" (live)
- Released: 8 February 1993
- Genre: Swingbeat
- Length: 3:37
- Label: RCA; BMG
- Songwriter: Gary Barlow
- Producers: Steve Jervier; Paul Jervier; Jonathan Wales

Take That singles chronology
| "Could It Be Magic" (1992) | "Why Can't I Wake Up with You" (1993) | "Pray" (1993) |

Alternative cover
- UK 7-inch limited edition EP

Music video
- "Why Can't I Wake Up with You" on YouTube

"Why Can't I Wake Up with You" is a song by English boy band Take That. Written by band member Gary Barlow, the song was released on 8 February 1993 by RCA Records and BMG as the lead single from their second album, Everything Changes (1993). The song reached number two on the UK Singles Chart and number seven in Ireland.

== Background and release ==
The original version of the song first appeared on their Take That & Party debut album; however, Gary Barlow re-wrote the song with a higher tempo and modified lyrics. This new version was released on 8 February 1993 and peaked at number two on the UK Singles Chart, spending 10 weeks on the UK Singles Chart. The song has since received a silver certification from the BPI for shipments of over 200,000 copies inside the UK.

== Critical reception ==
David Bennun from Melody Maker named the song "either the slumberous essence of post-coital tristesse, or the best ode to teenage sexual frustration since 'Wouldn't It Be Nice'." Pan-European magazine Music & Media wrote, "After Sting and Clapton using a Zippo lighter, here's another brilliant rhythm pattern. Take That sings this ballad on top of the clicks and beeps of a film transported in a camera." Alan Jones from Music Week gave it four out of five and named it Pick of the Week, adding, "Most sophisticated yet from Take That, a strong and tuneful mid-tempo song with a light and more than competent vocal." In a retrospective review, Pop Rescue noted that it has a "great beat and synth line", adding that "the 90's beat and samples, along with the bedtime talk from a breathy Gary" makes this a hit. Mark Frith from Smash Hits gave the song three out of five, commenting that it is "transformed from a slushy LP track to a Boyz II Men-style swingbeat mid-tempo thing."

== Music video ==
A music video was made to accompany the song. It depicts the band members on their own in different rooms of a house each singing the song, with Jason Orange dressed in just an open shirt and white briefs. At the end of the video, the band members are shown trying to get past paparazzi. David Bennun from Melody Maker felt Take That videos as "Why Can't I Wake Up with You?" "were perfect. The image, the moment, the feeling. [...] "Why Can't I Wake Up with You" rendering every Athena print obsolete at a stroke."

== Track listings ==
- UK CD single
1. "Why Can't I Wake Up with You?" (radio edit)
2. "A Million Love Songs" (live version)
3. "Satisfied" (live version)
4. "Take That Medley" (live version)
- UK 7-inch and cassette single

A1. "Why Can't I Wake Up with You?" (radio edit)
B1. "Why Can't I Wake Up with You?" (live version featuring a cappella)
B2. "A Million Love Songs" (live version)

- UK 7-inch EP

A1. "Why Can't I Wake Up with You?" (radio edit)
B1. "Promises" (live version)
B2. "Clap Your Hands" (live version)

- European CD single
1. "Why Can't I Wake Up with You?" (radio edit)
2. "Why Can't I Wake Up with You?" (live version featuring a cappella)
3. "A Million Love Songs" (extended mix)

Note: Track three is billed as the "live version" on the sleeve but actually contains an extended mix featuring a longer outro to the song.

- European 7-inch single

A. "Why Can't I Wake Up with You?" (radio edit)
B. "Why Can't I Wake Up with You?" (live version featuring a cappella)

== Personnel ==
- Gary Barlow – lead vocals
- Howard Donald – backing vocals
- Jason Orange – backing vocals
- Mark Owen – backing vocals
- Robbie Williams – backing vocals

== Charts ==
=== Weekly charts ===
| Chart (1993) | Peak position |
|---|---|
| Belgium (Ultratop 50 Flanders) | 30 |
| Europe (Eurochart Hot 100) | 8 |
| Finland (Suomen virallinen lista) | 17 |
| Germany (GfK) | 68 |
| Greece (IFPI Greece) | 4 |
| Ireland (IRMA) | 7 |
| Israel (Israeli Singles Chart) | 20 |
| Singapore (SPVA) | 3 |
| UK Singles (Official Charts) | 2 |
| UK Airplay (Music Week) | 6 |

=== Year-end charts ===
| Chart (1993) | Position |
|---|---|
| UK Singles (OCC) | 49 |

== Certifications ==
| Region | Certification | Certified units/sales |
|---|---|---|
| United Kingdom (BPI) | Silver | 200,000^{^} |
^{^} Shipments figures based on certification alone.
