= Babe (Take That song) =

1993 single by Take That

- UK CD1 artwork

Single by Take That

from the album Everything Changes
- B-side: "All I Want Is You"
- Released: 6 December 1993
- Length: 4:51
- Label: RCA; BMG
- Songwriter: Gary Barlow
- Producers: Steve Jervier; Paul Jervier; Jonathan Wales; Chris Porter; Dave Clayton

Take That singles chronology
"Relight My Fire" (1993)	"Babe" (1993)	"Everything Changes" (1994)

Alternative cover
- UK CD2 artwork

Alternative cover
- European CD artwork

Music video
- "Babe" on YouTube

"Babe" is a song by English boy band Take That, released in December 1993 by RCA Records and BMG as the fourth single from the band's second album, Everything Changes (1993). Written by bandmember Gary Barlow, it features Mark Owen on lead vocals. Production was led by David Clayton, who later spent 10 years as keyboard player and backing vocalist with Simply Red. Accompanied by a music video directed by Greg Masuak, the song became a number-one hit in both Ireland and the United Kingdom while peaking within the top 10 in Belgium, Finland, Germany, Israel, Lithuania, the Netherlands, Norway, Sweden and Switzerland.

== Release ==
Released on 6 December 1993, "Babe" became Take That's third single in a row to go straight to number one on the UK Singles Chart, knocking Mr Blobby's self-titled novelty single from the number-one slot in the process. With this achievement, Take That became the first band to have three consecutive singles debut at number one. The following week, Mr Blobby's single climbed back to number one, denying Take That the Christmas number-one place. The single sold 350,000 copies in 1993, and was that year's 14th biggest-selling single. The song was certified platinum on 1 January 1994 for shipments of over 600,000 copies in the UK.

== Critical reception ==
AllMusic editor Bryan Buss described the song as "surprisingly risqué". Tom Ewing of Freaky Trigger noted that the melody is "murky and sad – this is as fog-bound and haunted a number one as we've seen since the high Gothic of John Leyton – and the tension gives the story a dignity." In his weekly UK chart commentary, James Masterton said, "'Babe' is another slowly with a familiar lyrical theme of the prodigal lover returning to find his ex with a child bearing his eyes etc. etc. It grows on you as well". Chris Roberts from Melody Maker felt the "telephone gimmick" doesn't work, calling the song "mush". Alan Jones from Music Week gave it a score of four out of five, writing that "this overwrought ballad lacks the instant appeal of many of the group's previous singles. But the combination of massive media support, the Smash Hits Awards and large fanbase make it a cert."

David Quantick from NME said, "There's a telephone on it. The pace is ominous, threatening, even. The theme is the departure of a loved one and the failure to communicate with them on the (hey) telephone. The effect is of early Chris de Burgh when he was still writing super intergalactic-travelling cakarama like 'A Spaceman Came Travelling', (ie: you love it)." Leesa Daniels from Smash Hits gave "Babe" a top score of five out of five and named it Best New Single, calling it "gorgeous", and describing it as "a tale of a lost love that'll have you blubbing into your pillow for hours." She added that Mark Owen's vocals "are the real triumph".

== Music video ==
A music video was produced to promote the single, directed by Greg Masuak. It was the first Take That video to involve the members acting out a story using drama. The video runs parallel to the song's lyrics, showing Owen trying to track down a loved one after coming back from war. Later in the video it emerges that Owen has fathered a child. The video uses intercut clips of the band standing around Barlow, all performing the song. The last few seconds of the video are somewhat happier, showing outtakes of the band from the video. "Babe" received heavy rotation on MTV Europe and was A-listed on Germany's VIVA in February 1994.

The music video won the International Viewer's Choice Award for MTV Europe at the 1994 MTV Video Music Awards held in New York.

== Track listings ==
- UK 7-inch and cassette single, European CD single
1. "Babe" (Return remix) – 4:55
2. "All I Want Is You" – 3:21

Note: A limited-edition 7-inch version with a photo sleeve was also released.

- UK CD1 and Australian CD single
1. "Babe" (Return remix) – 4:55
2. "All I Want Is You" – 3:21
3. "Could It Be Magic" (live) – 6:18
4. "Pray" (live) – 6:33
- UK CD2 and Japanese CD single
1. "Babe" (Return remix) – 4:55
2. "It Only Takes a Minute" (live) – 3:47
3. "Give Good Feeling" (live) – 3:52

== Personnel ==
- Mark Owen – lead vocals
- Gary Barlow – backing vocals
- Howard Donald – backing vocals
- Jason Orange – backing vocals
- Robbie Williams – backing vocals

== Charts ==
=== Weekly charts ===
Original version

Chart (1993–1994)	Peak position
Austria (Ö3 Austria Top 40)	12
Belgium (Ultratop 50 Flanders)	10
Belgium (Ultratop 30 Wallonia)	13
Denmark (IFPI)	16
Europe (Eurochart Hot 100)	5
Europe (European AC Radio)	4
Europe (European Hit Radio)	16
Europe (Channel Crossovers)	5
Finland (Suomen virallinen lista)	8
Germany (GfK)	9
Greece (IFPI Greece)	4
Ireland (IRMA)	1
Israel (Israeli Singles Chart)	4
Italy (Musica e dischi)	22
Japan International (Oricon)	1
Latvia (Latvijas Top 40)	6
Lithuania (M-1)	4
Netherlands (Dutch Top 40)	4
Netherlands (Single Top 100)	5
Norway (VG-lista)	10
Singapore (SPVA)	1
Spain Airplay (Top 40 Radio)	23
Sweden (Sverigetopplistan)	7
Switzerland (Schweizer Hitparade)	8
UK Singles (Official Charts)	1
UK Airplay (Music Week)	1

Odyssey version

Chart (2018)	Peak position
UK Singles Downloads (Official Charts)	76
UK Singles Sales (OCC)	76

=== Year-end charts ===
Chart (1993)	Position
UK Singles (OCC)	14

Chart (1994)	Position
Belgium (Ultratop 50 Flanders)	43
Europe (Eurochart Hot 100)	33
Germany (Media Control)	42
Israel (Israeli Singles Chart)	19
Latvia (Latvijas Top 40)	27
Netherlands (Dutch Top 40)	33
Netherlands (Single Top 100)	40
Sweden (Topplistan)	53
Switzerland (Schweizer Hitparade)	21
UK Singles (OCC)	174

== Certifications ==
Region	Certification	Certified units/sales
Germany (BVMI)	Gold	250,000^{^}
United Kingdom (BPI)	Platinum	600,000^{^}
^{^} Shipments figures based on certification alone.

== Release history ==
Region	Date	Format(s)	Label(s)	Ref.
United Kingdom	6 December 1993	7-inch vinyl; CD; cassette	RCA; BMG	
Japan	21 January 1994	CD	RCA; BMG	
