= Pray (Take That song) =

1993 single by Take That

Single by Take That

from the album Everything Changes
- Released: 5 July 1993
- Genre: Pop; R&B
- Length: 3:44
- Label: RCA; BMG
- Songwriter: Gary Barlow
- Producers: Steve Jervier; Paul Jervier; Jonathan Wales

Take That singles chronology
"Why Can't I Wake Up with You" (1993)	"Pray" (1993)	"Relight My Fire" (1993)

Music video
- "Pray" on YouTube

"Pray – Odyssey version"

Single by Take That

from the album Odyssey
- Released: 21 September 2018
- Length: 3:40
- Label: Polydor
- Songwriter: Gary Barlow
- Producers: Stuart Price; Steve Jervier; Paul Jervier; Jonathan Wales

Take That singles chronology
"New Day" (2017)	"Pray – Odyssey version" (2018)	"Out of Our Heads" (2018)

Music video
- "Pray – Odyssey version" on YouTube

"Pray" is a song by English boy band Take That. Written by band member Gary Barlow, the ballad was released on 5 July 1993 by RCA Records and BMG as the second single from the band's second studio album, Everything Changes (1993). It is the first of twelve singles by the band to reach number one on the UK Singles Chart, staying at number one for four weeks, and starting a streak of four consecutive number-one singles. Take That became the first RCA act to debut at number one since Elvis Presley's "It's Now or Never" in 1960. The music video for "Pray" was directed by Greg Masuak and filmed in Mexico.

"Pray" has received a gold sales status certification and sold over 438,000 copies in the UK, won British Single of the Year and British Video of the Year at the 1994 Brit Awards, Best Video at the 1993 Smash Hits Awards, and was the finale of Take That's Beautiful World Tour 2007. In 1994, the song won the Ivor Novello for Best Contemporary Song and Songwriter of the Year for band lyricist Gary Barlow.

A newly arranged and recorded version was released on 21 September 2018 as the first single of their greatest hits album Odyssey. The album was released on 23 November 2018 followed by a Greatest Hits tour marking the band's 30th anniversary in 2019.

== Critical reception ==
AllMusic editor Peter Fawthrop described "Pray" as a "quality ballad" in his review of Everything Changes. Tom Ewing of Freaky Trigger complimented Barlow's songwriting on the song. He said that "at this point he was still the group's secret weapon – canny and professional enough to bring the hooks but with a streak of desperate earnestness. So the classic Take That song – "Pray" isn't their best, but it very much sets a template – wanders like a lost puppy on the verses then pulls itself together for a monster chorus." Caroline Sullivan from The Guardian viewed it as "rather fine". Chris Roberts from Melody Maker felt the song "boasted a fantastic chorus". Another Melody Maker editor, David Bennun, named it "one of Nineties pop's most exalted moments, and the only song so far to justify the talk about Gary Barlow's writing talent." A reviewer from Music & Media commented, "The five messiahs have found a juvenile congregation in the UK willing to lend its ear. Now they're praying for continental attention for their matchless bubble gum soul."

Alan Jones from Music Week gave "Pray" a score of three out of five. He found that it is a "fairly intricate mid-tempo workout [that] has pleasant harmonies and a glossy sheen, although the song itself is more slight than some of the group's previous efforts – none of which really matters, as it's bound for the Top Five." Smash Hits gave "Pray" four out of five, praising the chorus as "a fab gospel tune with the group sharing vocals and doing those beautiful harmonies that they seem to be getting so good at these days." The magazine also declared it as "a pretty mature song" and "a definite number 1." A reviewer from Staffordshire Sentinel complimented it as a "soulful ballad".

In a 2012 retrospect Pray was awarded The Guardian Music Award for Best Number 1 Single of 1993 stating "filled with euphoria, guitar riffs and the boys' echoing vocals, this was Take That at their peak, and rightly kept them at No 1 for four weeks".

== Music video ==
The accompanying music video for the song was directed by Greg Masuak and shot in Acapulco, Mexico. The clip features the band members in the exotic location singing and dancing. The band members are paired with a goddess of the four elements, taking on a different form with each – Air (Mark Owen), Fire (Jason Orange), Earth (Robbie Williams) and Water (Howard Donald) – with the exception of Gary Barlow who is represented in a neutral black and white context. In Barlow's autobiography, he stated that after the disappointment of where "I Found Heaven" was filmed, the band were a lot happier about the location for this video. Reflecting on the video in 2005 for Take That: For the Record, Donald remarked: "We was doing all the sexual thing and stuff. ... Even then it felt a little bit uncomfortable. But girls like it. Girls like this kind of thing." David Bennun from Melody Maker praised "the gorgeous, sinister, young Aryan cod-arcadia of "Pray", Leni Riefenstahl on MTV." The video was later made available remastered on Take That's official YouTube channel in 2009, and had generated more than eight million views as of early 2024 on the platform.

== Track listings ==
=== Original version ===
- UK CD1 and European CD single
1. "Pray" (radio edit)
2. "Pray" (a cappella)
3. "Pray" (alternative club mix)
- UK CD2
1. "Pray" (club swing mix)
2. "It Only Takes a Minute" (Tommy Musto Underground dub)
3. "Once You've Tasted Love" (Harding & Curnow remix)
4. "It Only Takes a Minute" (Tommy Musto Underground vocal)
- UK 7-inch and cassette single
1. "Pray" (radio edit)
2. "Pray" (a cappella)
- Australian maxi-CD single
1. "Pray" (radio edit) – 3:43
2. "Pray" (a cappella) – 4:26
3. "Pray" (alternative club mix) – 5:21
4. "Pray" (club swing mix)
5. "It Only Takes a Minute" (Tommy Musto Underground dub)
6. "Once You've Tasted Love" (Harding & Curnow remix)
7. "It Only Takes a Minute" (Tommy Musto Underground vocal)
- Australian Tour Edition CD single
1. "Pray" (radio edit)
2. "Relight My Fire" (live)
3. "Could It Be Magic" (live)
4. "It Only Takes a Minute" (live)

=== 2018 version ===
- International digital single
1. "Pray – Odyssey version" (new arrangement and vocals) – 3:40

== Personnel ==
- Gary Barlow – lead vocals
- Howard Donald – backing vocals
- Jason Orange – backing vocals
- Mark Owen – backing vocals
- Robbie Williams – backing vocals

== Charts ==
=== Weekly charts ===
Original version

Chart (1993–1996)	Peak position
Australia (ARIA)	10
Austria (Ö3 Austria Top 40)	24
Belgium (Ultratop 50 Flanders)	20
Belgium (Ultratop 30 Wallonia)	18
Canada Top Singles (RPM)	55
Canada Adult Contemporary (RPM)	24
Denmark (IFPI)	14
Europe (Eurochart Hot 100)	7
Europe (European AC Radio)	8
Europe (European Hit Radio)	5
Finland (Suomen virallinen lista)	20
France Airplay (SNEP)	35
Germany (GfK)	21
Greece (IFPI Greece)	3
Iceland (Íslenski Listinn Topp 40)	36
Ireland (IRMA)	2
Israel (Israeli Singles Chart)	2
Japan (Oricon)	58
Lithuania (M-1)	8
Netherlands (Dutch Top 40)	36
Netherlands (Single Top 100)	38
Norway (VG-lista)	8
Portugal (AFP)	4
Singapore (SPVA)	1
Spain Airplay (Top 40 Radio)	36
Sweden (Sverigetopplistan)	17
Switzerland (Schweizer Hitparade)	25
UK Singles (Official Charts)	1
UK Airplay (Music Week)	1
Zimbabwe (ZIMA)	11

Odyssey version

Chart (2018)	Peak position
UK Singles Downloads (Official Charts)	75
UK Singles Sales (OCC)	76

=== Year-end charts ===
Chart (1993)	Position
Europe (Eurochart Hot 100)	70
Europe (European Hit Radio)	36
Germany (Media Control)	99
Israel (Israeli Singles Chart)	27
UK Singles (OCC)	18
UK Airplay (Music Week)	16

Chart (1994)	Position
Australia (ARIA)	83

== Certifications ==
Region	Certification	Certified units/sales
United Kingdom (BPI)	Gold	438,000

== Release history ==
Region	Date	Format(s)	Label(s)	Ref.
United Kingdom	5 July 1993	7-inch vinyl; CD; cassette	RCA; BMG	
Australia	9 August 1993	CD; cassette	RCA; BMG	
Japan	1 September 1993	Mini-CD	RCA; BMG	
Australia (re-release)	9 May 1994	CD; cassette	RCA; BMG	
