= Jason Orange =

British retired pop singer (born 1970)

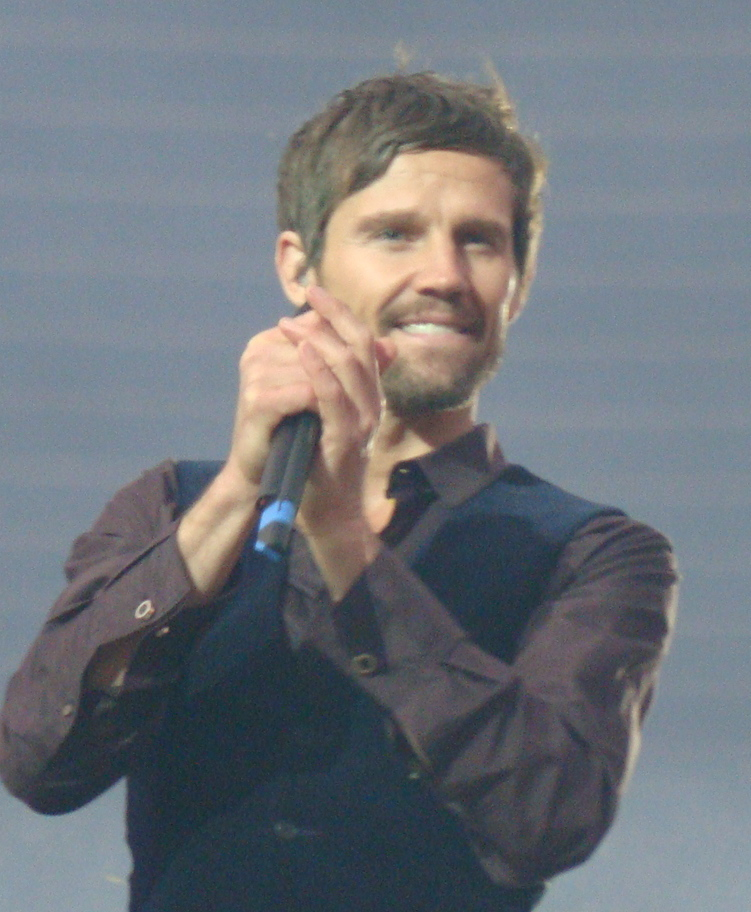
- Orange in 2011

Background information
- Born: Jason Thomas Orange; 10 July 1970 (age 56); Manchester, England
- Genres: Pop; pop rock
- Instruments: Vocals; guitar
- Years active: 1988–1999; 2005–2014
- Labels: Atlantic; BMG; Interscope; Polydor; RCA; UMG
- Formerly of: Take That

Jason Thomas Orange (born 10 July 1970) is an English retired singer. He is best known for being a member of the pop group Take That from the band's creation in 1990 until their split in 1996, and again from their reunion in 2005 until he retired from entertainment in September 2014.

== Career ==
Orange was part of the Manchester-based breakdance crew Street Machine in the mid-1980s. They won the Manchester round of the UK Breakdancing Championship in 1985. He also appeared on the show The Hit Man and Her as a featured dancer and was a member of a duo called Look Twice in 1990.

Orange joined Take That when the group was created in 1990 and stayed with them until their hiatus in February 1996. As an actor, he appeared in the 1998 crime drama series Killer Net, for which his appearance was a major selling point. The following year, he took the leading role in a London stage production of Gob, written by Jim Kenworth and directed by James Martin Charlton.

Take That reunited without Robbie Williams in 2005 and released a new greatest hits album, followed in 2006 by Beautiful World, their first studio album since 1995. Orange contributed both songwriting and lead vocals on the album, as he had done for past albums. In 2008, the band released the album The Circus. In 2010, Williams rejoined the group and they released the album Progress. Orange continued to act, appearing in a cameo role as "DJ Scouse Mouse" in the Channel 4 comedy series Shameless in April 2013.

On 24 September 2014, it was announced that Orange had left Take That as he wished to retire from the entertainment industry. Since leaving Take That, Orange has noticeably left the public eye, with bandmate Howard Donald saying in 2018: "Jason has gone off the grid. He's not taking emails or phone calls or stuff like that". He was the only member of the group who did not take part in their 2026 documentary.

== Personal life ==
Jason Thomas Orange was born on 10 July 1970 in Manchester to Tony and Jenny Orange a few minutes before his twin brother Justin. He studied A-Level English at South Trafford College from 2001 to 2003 and then took an Access to Higher Education course on biology, history and psychology, though he did not attend university. In 1993, when Lulu recorded "Relight My Fire" with Take That, she and Orange had "a very brief dalliance."
