= Take That Live =

2015 concert tour by Take That

- Tour by Take That
- Location: Europe
- Associated album: III
- Start date: 27 April 2015
- End date: 13 October 2015
- Legs: 1
- No. of shows: 51 (total)
- Supporting acts: Ella Henderson; Lawson; Nessi; Emin

Take That concert chronology
- Progress Live (2011); Take That Live (2015); Wonderland Live (2017)

Take That Live (also known as the III Tour) was the ninth concert tour by the English band Take That, in support of their seventh studio album III. The shows were announced on 8 November 2014. The demand for the tour led to all dates selling out as soon as they went on sale, with some dates selling out in pre-sale alone. Due to this demand, Take That announced extra dates to their tour. On 26 January 2015, a European leg of the tour was announced. It is their first concert tour since the Progress Live tour in 2011 and the first to feature the band as a trio following the departures of Jason Orange and Robbie Williams.

The tour has received critical acclaim with many saying it is the band's most visually spectacular show to date. The tour opened in Glasgow at The SSE Hydro. The Pollstar 2015 Mid-Year Top 100 Worldwide Tour list revealed the tour as the 6th highest grosser, with a total of $60.8 million from 42 shows, and a total of 558,156 in attendance.

== Opening acts ==
- Ella Henderson (except on 15 and 16 May)
- Lawson (on 15 and 16 May only)
- Nessi (on 2 and 4 October only)
- Emin (on 7 October, 8 October and 13 October only)

== Set list ==
1. "I Like It"
2. "Love Love"
3. "Greatest Day"
4. "Get Ready For It"
5. "Hold Up a Light"
6. "Patience"
7. "The Garden"
8. "Up All Night"
9. "Said It All"
10. "Could It Be Magic" (contains elements of "Barry Manilow version")
11. "Let In The Sun"
12. "Affirmation"
13. "The Flood"
14. "Flaws"
15. "Relight My Fire" (contains elements of "Vertigo")
16. "Back For Good"
17. "Pray"
18. "Portrait" (only on UK and Ireland dates)
19. "These Days"
20. "Rule the World"

Encore

21. "Shine" (contains elements of "Mr. Blue Sky")
22. "Never Forget"

== Tour dates ==
List of concerts, showing date, city, country, venue, tickets sold, number of available tickets and amount of gross revenue
| Date | City | Country | Venue | Attendance | Revenue |
|---|---|---|---|---|---|
Europe
| 27 April 2015 | Glasgow | Scotland | The SSE Hydro | 49,283 / 50,110 | $5,285,250 |
| 28 April 2015 | Glasgow | Scotland | The SSE Hydro | 49,283 / 50,110 | $5,285,250 |
| 30 April 2015 | Glasgow | Scotland | The SSE Hydro | 49,283 / 50,110 | $5,285,250 |
| 1 May 2015 | Glasgow | Scotland | The SSE Hydro | 49,283 / 50,110 | $5,285,250 |
| 2 May 2015 | Glasgow | Scotland | The SSE Hydro | 49,283 / 50,110 | $5,285,250 |
| 4 May 2015 | Belfast | Northern Ireland | Odyssey Arena | — | — |
| 5 May 2015 | Belfast | Northern Ireland | Odyssey Arena | — | — |
| 8 May 2015 | Dublin | Ireland | 3Arena | — | — |
| 9 May 2015 | Dublin | Ireland | 3Arena | — | — |
| 11 May 2015 | Birmingham | England | Genting Arena | — | — |
| 12 May 2015 | Birmingham | England | Genting Arena | — | — |
| 14 May 2015 | Birmingham | England | Genting Arena | — | — |
| 15 May 2015 | Birmingham | England | Genting Arena | — | — |
| 16 May 2015 | Birmingham | England | Genting Arena | — | — |
| 18 May 2015 | Newcastle | England | Metro Radio Arena | — | — |
| 19 May 2015 | Newcastle | England | Metro Radio Arena | — | — |
| 21 May 2015 | Manchester | England | Manchester Arena | 122,767 / 130,458 | $13,253,100 |
| 22 May 2015 | Manchester | England | Manchester Arena | 122,767 / 130,458 | $13,253,100 |
| 23 May 2015 | Manchester | England | Manchester Arena | 122,767 / 130,458 | $13,253,100 |
| 25 May 2015 | Manchester | England | Manchester Arena | 122,767 / 130,458 | $13,253,100 |
| 26 May 2015 | Manchester | England | Manchester Arena | 122,767 / 130,458 | $13,253,100 |
| 28 May 2015 | Manchester | England | Manchester Arena | 122,767 / 130,458 | $13,253,100 |
| 29 May 2015 | Manchester | England | Manchester Arena | 122,767 / 130,458 | $13,253,100 |
| 30 May 2015 | Manchester | England | Manchester Arena | 122,767 / 130,458 | $13,253,100 |
| 1 June 2015 | Sheffield | England | Motorpoint Arena Sheffield | — | — |
| 2 June 2015 | Sheffield | England | Motorpoint Arena Sheffield | — | — |
| 4 June 2015 | London | England | The O_{2} Arena | 144,873 / 159,066 | $15,955,600 |
| 5 June 2015 | London | England | The O_{2} Arena | 144,873 / 159,066 | $15,955,600 |
| 6 June 2015 | London | England | The O_{2} Arena | 144,873 / 159,066 | $15,955,600 |
| 8 June 2015 | London | England | The O_{2} Arena | 144,873 / 159,066 | $15,955,600 |
| 9 June 2015 | London | England | The O_{2} Arena | 144,873 / 159,066 | $15,955,600 |
| 11 June 2015 | London | England | The O_{2} Arena | 144,873 / 159,066 | $15,955,600 |
| 12 June 2015 | London | England | The O_{2} Arena | 144,873 / 159,066 | $15,955,600 |
| 13 June 2015 | London | England | The O_{2} Arena | 144,873 / 159,066 | $15,955,600 |
| 15 June 2015 | London | England | The O_{2} Arena | 144,873 / 159,066 | $15,955,600 |
| 18 June 2015 | Manchester | England | Manchester Arena | (Note: The score data is representative of the two shows at the Manchester Arena on 21–30 May and 18 June.) | |
| 19 June 2015 | London | England | The O_{2} Arena | — | — |
| 22 June 2015 | Birmingham | England | Genting Arena | — | — |
| 23 June 2015 | Birmingham | England | Genting Arena | — | — |
| 24 June 2015 | Sheffield | England | Motorpoint Arena Sheffield | — | — |
| 26 June 2015 | Newcastle | England | Metro Radio Arena | — | — |
| 1 October 2015 | Herning | Denmark | Jyske Bank Boxen | — | — |
| 2 October 2015 | Hamburg | Germany | Barclaycard Arena | 9,156 / 11,452 | $636,637 |
| 4 October 2015 | Cologne | Germany | Lanxess Arena | — | — |
| 5 October 2015 | Munich | Germany | Olympiahalle | — | — |
| 7 October 2015 | Amsterdam | Netherlands | Ziggo Dome | — | — |
| 8 October 2015 | Berlin | Germany | Velodrom | — | — |
| 9 October 2015 | Vienna | Austria | Wiener Stadthalle | — | — |
| 11 October 2015 | Stuttgart | Germany | Hanns-Martin-Schleyer-Halle | — | — |
| 12 October 2015 | Zürich | Switzerland | Hallenstadion | 4,895 / 13,000 | $316,564 |
| 13 October 2015 | Milan | Italy | Mediolanum Forum | — | — |
| Total | | | | 330,974 / 355,568 (93%) | $35,447,150 |

== DVD release ==
On 12 May 2015, it was revealed that The O2 Arena, London show on 19 June would be recorded and made into a concert film. A one-minute and nine second trailer for the film was released on the groups YouTube channel. The trailer consisted of footage from the tour at earlier dates mixed with behind the scenes footage of Progress Live. The group released the recorded footage on DVD on 11 Dec 2015. This was confirmed by Barlow on Twitter. On 15 October 2015, it was announced that a DVD of the show will be released alongside an updated edition of III. Strangely, no Blu-ray release was announced, despite some tracks being shown in HD on a BBC Television special about the tour.
