= III (Take That album) =

Studio album by Take That
- Released: 28 November 2014
- Recorded: January–September 2014
- Studios: Bungalow Palace Studio (Los Angeles, United States); The Canvas Room (London, United Kingdom); Dean Street Studios (London); Echo Studio (Los Angeles, United States); Electric Lady Studios (New York City, United States); Future Studios (London); Henson Studios (Hollywood, United States); Kite Music Productions (Los Angeles); RAK Studios (London); Tracques (Los Angeles); Wolf Cousins Studio (Stockholm, Sweden)
- Genres: Pop; dance-pop; indietronica; disco
- Length: 45:09
- Label: Polydor
- Producers: Greg Kurstin; Stuart Price; Mattman & Robin; Jeff Lynne; AFSHeeN; Josh Cumbee; WTNSS

Take That chronology
Progress Live (2011)	III (2014)	Wonderland (2017)

Singles from III
- 1. "These Days" Released: 14 November 2014; 2. "Get Ready For It" Released: 13 January 2015 (promotional only); 3. "Let in the Sun" Released: 2 March 2015; 4. "Higher Than Higher" Released: 8 June 2015; 5. "Hey Boy" Released: 16 October 2015

III is the seventh studio album by English pop band Take That. It is their first studio album since 2010's Progress and the first to feature the band as a trio, following the departures of Jason Orange and Robbie Williams. The album was released on 28 November 2014. According to Gary Barlow, the album's sound is an "amalgamation of the past eight years" of Take That material.

The album debuted at number one in the UK, becoming Take That's seventh number-one album.

== Recording ==
Recording for the album began in January 2014, with Gary Barlow, Howard Donald and Mark Owen entering the recording studio as a trio, with the consent of Jason Orange, who was undecided at the time whether or not he wanted to continue with the band. At the time, Robbie Williams had stated that he may not be able to record as part of the group due to his tour commitments and the upcoming birth of his second child. In the end, Williams was not present during the recording sessions.

In September 2014, Orange officially announced his departure from the band, and the band re-entered the studio to record the remaining parts which had been left for Orange. Donald claimed that the band did consider splitting up following Orange's departure, but decided against this and instead pressed on with recording the album. Owen said of the album, "It was quite downbeat, and we needed to change it to bring more energy to it. Then around May the three of us locked ourselves down for two or three weeks and started to play with sounds and for me that’s when we started for real. The energy was more positive. Now it's one of our most upbeat records." Barlow also said of the album, "We’re not writing a retirement record."

== Composition ==
"These Days", the album's lead single, was co-written by Jamie Norton and Ben Mark, and produced by Greg Kurstin (Katy Perry, Kylie Minogue, Lily Allen). The song is described as a signature Kurstin song, featuring "Chic-style funk guitar riffs and Pet Shop Boys-style vocal effects." as well as "having pure pop written all over it". "Let in the Sun" is described as the likely second single from the album, and a mix between Calvin Harris and Mumford & Sons. The song was produced by Stuart Price. Barlow described the song as a "homage to the early years", whilst Owen said it's "the song your dad would write if he was trying to get down with the kids."

"If You Want It" is described as a "90s sounding pop banger with big production and an uplifting chorus", again produced by Kurstin. A line in the song, "Everything could be a little bit brighter", is suggested to be a nod to the band's recent struggles. Barlow said that a video for the song could be reminiscent of the early years of DJ Jazzy Jeff and the Fresh Prince. "Get Ready for It" was written for the soundtrack of the forthcoming British film Kingsman: The Secret Service, starring Colin Firth and Michael Caine. The song was produced by John Shanks, and is described as "loud" and "euphoric" and "unmistakably Take That", with a heavy drum introduction, and a battle cry from Barlow. The album also features production by Jeff Lynne.

== Singles ==
- "These Days" was released as the lead single from the album on 14 November 2014. The song premiered on 10 October 2014 and was then released to Vevo in the form of an audio video. The song debuted at number one on the UK Singles Chart, becoming Take That's 12th number one single.
- "Get Ready For It" was released as a promotional video single for both the album and film Kingsman: The Secret Service on 13 January 2015.
- "Let in the Sun" was released as the album's second single on 2 March 2015.
- "Higher Than Higher" was confirmed as the album's third single and was released on 8 June 2015.
- "Hey Boy" was confirmed as the album's fourth single and first from the 2015 Special Edition album on 16 October 2015.

== Critical reception ==
Professional ratings
Aggregate scores
Source	Rating
Metacritic	42/100
Review scores
Source	Rating
AllMusic	3.5/5 stars
The Daily Telegraph	3/5 stars
Evening Herald	4.5/5 stars
The Evening Standard	3/5 stars
Entertainment.ie	3/5 stars
The Independent	2/5 stars
Metro	4/5 stars
The Times	3/5 stars

Upon its release, III received a mixed response from music critics. The Evening Herald awarded the album 4.5 stars out of 5 commenting that "for just three guys, Take That create an epic sound. Pure pop, English-style." The Herald continued by stating that "despite 4 years since their last album release, "Take That seem destined to ride the changes with a relentless feel-good optimism that defies personal catastrophe and natural disaster. Take That's mission is to write a big chorus and then nail it in the studio. And that's what they do, repeatedly, on III and they have fun doing it. The golden age of Glam Rock is reprised on the thumping I Like It. And they go all philosophical on Lovelife, chorusing to a clattering Hi-NRG Eurobeat, "If I die before I wake up, ask myself: Did I give enough love?" The Herald concluded, calling "December a sensational super-sizzler for millions of fans of the remodelled Take That."

The Daily Telegraph awarded the album 3 stars out of 5, branding it "the usual sleek, crowd-pleasing pop, giving fans what they want; upbeat, anthemic, singalong pop with generically uplifting lyrics about the triumph of love, the power of friendship and the rewards of loyalty." The Telegraph described the "first single, These Days, [as setting] the stall out, with its nostalgic plea to "take me back", evoking the up-tempo disco delights of Take That's Nineties boy band origins given a dense, contemporary pop gloss, everything thickly harmonised and punchily compressed. Epic mid-tempo ballad Freeze might be construed as a comment on the departure of Mr Orange, with Gary Barlow pleading "just freeze so that we don't have to start again". It concluded by stating that the album's "intentions are straightforward, to entertain, make fans happy and keep the show on the road, and it surely delivers on all counts."

Metro praised III, giving it 4/5 and dubbing it an "irresistible tinsel-draped Christmas party-starter". The review also noted highlights of the album such as "the opening lines of Portrait, delivered with a soaring melodic irresolution" and said that "there's classic Barlow-style balladry in Flaws" and praised the inclusion of Greg Kurstin as producer, saying that he adds "a sheen of contemporary production smarts [to the album]". Music Matters commented that the departure of Orange is a loss, but noted that Barlow, Owen and Donald "crafted an album that pulls off the post-reunion TT's favourite trick - sounding utterly contemporary, yet somehow intrinsically Take That-y". The review summarised by saying that "they still knock out killer choruses" and "Take That's future may no longer be Orange, but it's still bright".

AllMusic gave the album 3.5 stars and said that the trio "retain a shade of the stylish sensibilities of Progress", and that the album "is livelier" than Barlow's solo work. Yet the album is modern, "reflective and tasteful".

== Commercial performance ==
Upon its release, III broke the record for the most pre-ordered album in Amazon UK's history. The album debuted at number one on the UK Albums Chart with first-week sales of 145,000 (the third highest of 2014), becoming Take That's sixth UK number-one studio album and seventh overall. It was the tenth best-seller of 2014, completing an all-British top 10 for the first time in UK chart history. As of March 2016, 579,000 copies of the album were sold making it the least successful album of the band so far.

== Track listing ==
The standard version of the album contains twelve tracks, while the deluxe edition boasts an additional three bonus tracks. A super-deluxe edition of the album released in a bespoke artwork box with five photographic prints, as well as being signed in limited quantities, is available from the band's official store. Google Play also secured the rights to an exclusive version of the album, which contains an additional three bonus tracks including a remix of "These Days".

All tracks are written by Gary Barlow, Mark Owen and Howard Donald, additional songwriters are noted below.

Standard edition
No.	Title	Writer(s)	Producer(s)	Length
1.	"These Days" (lead vocals: Barlow, Owen, Donald)	Jamie Norton; Ben Mark	Greg Kurstin	3:51
2.	"Let in the Sun" (lead vocals: Barlow)	Edvard Førre Erfjord; Gary Go; Cass Lowe; Henrik Barman Michelsen	Stuart Price	3:39
3.	"If You Want It" (lead vocals: Barlow)	Kurstin	Kurstin	4:02
4.	"Lovelife" (lead vocals: Owen)	Norton; Mark	Price	3:35
5.	"Portrait" (lead vocals: Barlow)		Price	3:34
6.	"Higher Than Higher" (lead vocals: Barlow)	Mattias Larsson; Robin Fredriksson; Joe Janiak	Mattman & Robin	4:06
7.	"I Like It" (lead vocals: Barlow, Donald, Owen)	John Shanks	Price	4:22
8.	"Give You My Love" (lead vocals: Donald)		Price	2:49
9.	"Freeze" (lead vocals: Barlow, Owen, Donald)		Kurstin	4:01
10.	"Into the Wild" (lead vocals: Owen)	Go; John Martin	Price	3:52
11.	"Flaws" (lead vocals: Barlow)		Shanks	3:33
12.	"Get Ready for It" (lead vocals: Barlow)	Steve Robson	Shanks	3:39
Total length:				45:09

Deluxe edition
No.	Title	Writer(s)	Producer(s)	Length
13.	"Believe" (lead vocals: Owen)	Mark; Norton	Shanks	4:19
14.	"Amazing" (lead vocals: Barlow)	Mark; Shanks	Shanks	4:04
15.	"Do It All for Love" (lead vocals: Owen)	Mark; Shanks	Shanks	4:16
Total length:				57:48

Google Play deluxe edition
No.	Title	Writer(s)	Producer(s)	Length
16.	"Fall Down at Your Feet" (lead vocals: Barlow)		Jeff Lynne	2:55
17.	"If It's Not Love" (lead vocals: Barlow)	Barlow; Shanks	Shanks	3:37
18.	"These Days" (Steve Pitron & Max Sanna Remix Edit)	Norton; Mark	Kurstin; Steve Pitron; Max Sanna	3:43
Total length:				1:08:03

2015 edition
No.	Title	Writer(s)	Producer(s)	Length
16.	"Hey Boy" (lead vocals: Owen, Barlow, Donald)	Norton; Mark	Kurstin	3:44
17.	"Will You Be There for Me" (lead vocals: Barlow)	Afshin Salmani; Josh Cumbee	AFSHeeN; Cumbee	3:37
18.	"Carry Me Home" (lead vocals: Barlow, Owen, Donald)	Mark Taylor; Paul Barry; Mark	Charlie Russell; Bradley Spence	4:15
19.	"Bird in Your Hand" (lead vocals: Owen)	Mark; Norton; Michael C. Corson	Russell; Spence	3:20
Total length:				1:12:44

2015 edition DVD: Live 2015
No.	Title	Length
20.	"Prologue"	10:13
21.	"I Like It"	5:08
22.	"Love Love"	3:38
23.	"Greatest Day"	3:40
24.	"Get Ready for It"	3:43
25.	"Hold Up a Light"	6:13
26.	"Patience"	5:42
27.	"The Garden"	5:18
28.	"Up All Night"	3:00
29.	"Said It All"	4:28
30.	"Could It Be Magic"	4:16
31.	"Let in the Sun"	4:52
32.	"Affirmation"	3:39
33.	"The Flood"	4:46
34.	"Flaws"	3:46
35.	"Relight My Fire"	6:12
36.	"Back for Good"	6:34
37.	"Pray"	5:17
38.	"Portrait"	4:19
39.	"These Days"	5:32
40.	"Rule the World"	4:34
41.	"Shine"	5:45
42.	"Never Forget"	6:52
43.	"Credits"	3:42

== Personnel ==
Credits adapted from the liner notes.

=== Musicians ===
- Gary Barlow – vocals, keyboards (tracks 5, 8, 15), piano (11, 12, 15), horns (13), strings (13, 14), programming (15)
- Greg Kurstin – bass guitar, guitar, keyboards (tracks 1, 3, 9, 16 "Hey Boy"), drums (1, 3, 16)
- Stuart Price – guitar, keyboards, programming (tracks 2, 4, 5, 7, 8, 10)
- Cass Lowe, Edvard Førre Erfjord, Henrik Barman Michelsen – guitar (except Michelsen), additional programming, keyboards (track 2)
- Mattman and Robin – bass guitar, drums, guitar, keyboards, Hammond organ, percussion, programming (track 6)
- Joe Janiak – backing vocals (track 6)
- Aaron Redfield – drums (track 9)
- John Martin – guitar (track 10)
- Gary Go – additional synthesizer (track 10)
- Thorne – additional programming (track 10)
- Ben Mark – guitar (tracks 10, 11, 18 "Carry Me Home"), bass guitar (18), keyboards (19)
- John Shanks – bass guitar, guitar, keyboards (tracks 11–15), dulcimer (12)
- Victor Indrizzo – percussion (tracks 11–13), drums (12, 13)
- Charlie Judge – keyboards (tracks 11–13), piano and synth strings (13)
- Paul LaMalfa – programming (tracks 11–13)
- Dan Chase – programming (tracks 11, 12, 14, 15), keyboards (11, 12, 15)
- Ryan Carline – piano (track 14)
- Jeremy Stacey – drums (track 14)
- Perry Montague-Mason – leader (tracks 14, 15)
- Jeff Lynne – bass guitar, drums, guitar, keyboards, piano (track 16 "Fall Down at Your Feet")
- Kevin Holbrough, James Russell, Malcolm Strachan – brass (track 16 "Hey Boy")
- Phil Jewson – additional keyboards (16 "Hey Boy"), brass and strings (track 18 "Carry Me Home")
- Josh Cumbee – guitar, keyboards, programming, additional backing vocals (track 17 "Will You Be There for Me")
- Afshin Salmani – keyboards, programming (track 17 "Will You Be There for Me")
- Jon Green – keyboards, piano (track 18 "Carry Me Home")
- Charlie Russell, Bradley Spence – percussion (track 18 "Carry Me Home"), keyboards, programming (18, 19)
- Jamie Norton – keyboards (track 19)

=== Production ===
- Greg Kurstin – producer, engineer (tracks 1, 3, 9, 16 "Hey Boy")
- Julian Burg – engineer (tracks 1, 16 "Hey Boy"), additional engineer (3, 9)
- Alex Pasco – additional engineer (tracks 1, 3, 9), engineer (16 "Hey Boy")
- John Hanes – pre-mix engineer (track 16 "Hey Boy")
- Stuart Price – producer (tracks 2, 4, 5, 7, 8, 10), mixing engineer (2, 4)
- Ryan Carline – engineer (tracks 2, 4, 5, 7, 8, 10), additional engineer (11–15), vocal engineer
- Mattman and Robin – producers (track 6)
- John Shanks – producer (tracks 11–15)
- Shari Sutcliffe – project contractor and coordinator (tracks 11–15)
- Paul LaMalfa – engineer (tracks 11–15)
- Mike Horner, Phil Joly, Kyle Stevens – assistant engineers (tracks 11–15)
- Lars Fox – digital engineer and editor (tracks 11–15)
- Will Malone – strings arranger and conductor (tracks 14, 15)
- Isobel Griffiths – orchestra contractor (tracks 14, 15)
- Manny Marroquin – mixing engineer (tracks 1, 3, 5–7, 9–15)
- Chris Galland, Ike Schultz – assistant mixing engineers (tracks 1, 3, 5–7, 9–15)
- Andros Rodriguez – mixing engineer (track 8)
- Jeff Lynne – producer (track 16 "Fall Down at Your Feet")
- Afshin Salmani, Josh Cumbee – producers, engineers (track 17 "Will You Be There for Me")
- Toby Gad – co-producer (track 17 "Will You Be There for Me")
- Charlie Russell, Bradley Spence – producers (tracks 18 "Carry Me Home", 19), mixing engineers (19)
- Tom Upex – engineer (tracks 16 "Hey Boy", 18 "Carry Me Home")
- Jonny Solway – assistant engineer (tracks 16 "Hey Boy", 18 "Carry Me Home")
- Spike Stent – mixing engineer (tracks 17 "Will You Be There for Me", 18 "Carry Me Home")
- Geoff Swan – assistant mixing engineer (tracks 17 "Will You Be There for Me", 18 "Carry Me Home")
- Austen Jux-Chandler – engineer (track 18 "Carry Me Home")
- Dave Kutch – mastering engineer

== Charts ==
=== Weekly charts ===
Weekly chart performance for III
Chart (2014)	Peak position
Belgian Albums (Ultratop Flanders)	84
Belgian Albums (Ultratop Wallonia)	118
Danish Albums (Hitlisten)	23
Dutch Albums (Album Top 100)	64
German Albums (Offizielle Top 100)	26
Greek Albums (IFPI Greece)	53
Irish Albums (IRMA)	6
Italian Albums (FIMI)	39
Italian Albums (Musica e Dischi)	30
Japanese Albums (Oricon)	182
Scottish Albums (OCC)	2
South Korean International Albums (Gaon Chart)	18
Spanish Albums (Promusicae)	54
Swiss Albums (Schweizer Hitparade)	59
Taiwanese Albums (G-Music)	6
UK Albums (Official Charts)	1

=== Year-end charts ===
Year-end chart performance for III
Chart (2014)	Position
UK Albums (OCC)	10
Chart (2015)	Position
UK Albums (OCC)	33

== Certifications ==
Certifications for III
Region	Certification	Certified units/sales
United Kingdom (BPI)	Platinum	579,000

== Release history ==
Release history and formats for III
Country	Date	Format	Label
Germany	28 November 2014	CD; digital download	Polydor
Ireland	28 November 2014	CD; digital download	Polydor
United Kingdom	1 December 2014	CD; digital download	Polydor
United Kingdom	20 November 2015	CD; digital download; (2015 edition)	Polydor
