= Progress Live (album) =

Live album by Take That
- Released: 21 November 2011
- Recorded: June – July 2011
- Venues: Wembley Stadium, London; Etihad Stadium, Manchester
- Genres: Pop; pop rock; electropop
- Length: 108:46
- Label: Polydor

Take That chronology
Progressed (2011)	Progress Live (2011)	III (2014)

Progress Live is the twelfth album released by English pop band Take That. It is also the band's second live album to date and was released as a double disc album in Europe on 21 November 2011 and in the UK on 28 November 2011. The album was recorded during their Progress Live tour at Wembley Stadium in London and Etihad Stadium in Manchester in June and July 2011.

== Promotion ==
To promote the release of Progress Live on home media and CD, Take That released a music video of their track "Eight Letters" which featured as the closing track on the album Progress and the final song they performed on the setlist of Progress Live. The music video shows highlights of the shows, including behind the scenes footage and the band performing and greeting the fans at the finale. The camera then pans away from Take That as they leave the stage, before receding further to reveal the stage set with the 60 ft mechanical man as it stands arms wide and its heart beating, standing out against the night sky. The song was also released to radio, where it was playlisted by Radio 2 on its first week of radio airplay.

== Track listing ==
Disc 1
No.	Title	Writer(s)	Length
1.	"Rule the World"	Gary Barlow; Howard Donald; Jason Orange; Mark Owen	4:10
2.	"Greatest Day"	Barlow; Donald; Orange; Owen	3:54
3.	"Hold Up a Light"	Barlow; Donald; Orange; Owen; Ben Mark; Jamie Norton	4:27
4.	"Patience"	Barlow; Donald; Orange; Owen; John Shanks	3:28
5.	"Shine"	Barlow; Donald; Orange; Owen; Steve Robson	5:43
6.	"Let Me Entertain You"	Robbie Williams; Guy Chambers	5:54
7.	"Rock DJ"	Williams; Chambers; Kelvin Andrews; Nelson Pigford; Ekundayo Paris	4:28
8.	"Come Undone"	Williams; Kristian Ottestad; Ashley Hamilton; Daniel Pierre	4:16
9.	"Feel"	Williams; Chambers	4:27
10.	"Angels"	Williams; Chambers	4:46

Disc 2
No.	Title	Writer(s)	Length
1.	"The Flood"	Barlow; Donald; Orange; Owen; Williams	4:53
2.	"SOS"	Barlow; Donald; Orange; Owen; Williams	3:58
3.	"Underground Machine"	Barlow; Donald; Orange; Owen; Williams	4:58
4.	"Kidz"	Barlow; Donald; Orange; Owen; Williams	6:51
5.	"Pretty Things"	Barlow; Donald; Orange; Owen; Williams	4:05
6.	"When They Were Young Medley" ("A Million Love Songs"/"Babe"/"Everything Changes")	Barlow; Michael Ward; Eliot Kennedy; Cary Bayliss	4:32
7.	"Back for Good"	Barlow	5:14
8.	"Pray"	Barlow	5:37
9.	"Love Love"	Barlow; Donald; Orange; Owen; Williams	3:58
10.	"Never Forget"	Barlow	7:31
11.	"No Regrets"/"Relight My Fire"	Williams; Chambers; Dan Hartman	5:54
12.	"Eight Letters"	Barlow; Donald; Orange; Owen; Williams; Midge Ure; Chris Cross; Warren Cann; Billy Currie	5:42

Notes

- "Eight Letters" samples "Vienna" as performed by Ultravox and written by Midge Ure, Chris Cross, Warren Cann and Billy Currie.
- "When They Were Young" Medley consists of "A Million Love Songs" and "Babe", which were written by Gary Barlow, and "Everything Changes", which was written by Barlow, Michael Ward, Eliot Kennedy, Cary Bayliss.

== Charts ==
=== Weekly charts ===
Chart (2011)	Peak position
Belgian Heatseekers Albums (Ultratop Flanders)	19
Belgian Heatseekers Albums (Ultratop Wallonia)	6
Irish Albums (IRMA)	24
Scottish Albums (OCC)	12
UK Albums (OCC)	12

=== Year-end charts ===
Chart (2011)	Position
UK Albums (OCC)	65

== Certifications ==
Region	Certification	Certified units/sales
United Kingdom (BPI)	Gold	100,000^{*}
^{*} Sales figures based on certification alone.

== Release history ==
Region	Date	Format
Denmark	21 November 2011	CD
Germany	25 November 2011	CD
United Kingdom	28 November 2011	CD
