= Progress Live =

2011 concert tour by Take That

- Tour by Take That
- Location: Europe
- Associated albums: Progress Progressed
- Start date: 27 May 2011
- End date: 29 July 2011
- Legs: 1
- No. of shows: 35 (total)
- Supporting act: Pet Shop Boys
- Box office: US$185.2 million ($265.06 in 2025 dollars)

Take That concert chronology
- Take That Present: The Circus Live (2009); Progress Live (2011); Take That Live (2015)

Home Media release
- Home Media Cover, at City of Manchester Stadium, Manchester

Progress Live was the eighth concert tour by the English pop group Take That. The tour, sponsored by Samsung, supported their sixth studio album, Progress as they visited major cities in the UK and Europe. It was the first tour to feature all five original members performing together in 16 years and the final tour to feature Jason Orange and Robbie Williams. In its infancy, the tour accomplished many accolades including selling 1.34 million tickets in less than 24 hours. The tour quickly became the biggest tour in the United Kingdom. They played 8 nights each at City of Manchester Stadium in Manchester and also Wembley Stadium in London – breaking the previous record held by Michael Jackson's Bad World Tour set in 1988. These eight nights at Wembley Stadium saw Take That break the record for the highest-grossing residency by grossing £38 million ($61 million) from their respective London dates alone. At the conclusion of 2011, the tour was placed on Billboard's annual, "Top 25 Tours", and appeared third worldwide, earning over $180 million with 29 shows. Each member of the band received £7,900,000 from the tour after tax.

== Background ==
In early 2010, the media reported that Robbie Williams and Gary Barlow were recording a duet in Los Angeles, California. Since that announcement, numerous rumours emerged of Williams reuniting with the band. In July 2010, the band confirmed his joining and also announced that all five members were recording an album. The popularity of the tour surpassed their previous fest, which was viewed by over 600,000 spectators.

== Opening act ==
- Pet Shop Boys

== Setlist ==
Take That (four-piece)

1. "Rule the World"
2. "Greatest Day"
3. "Hold Up a Light"
4. "Patience"
5. "Shine" (contains elements of "Mr. Blue Sky")

Robbie Williams

6. "Let Me Entertain You" (contains elements of "Sgt. Pepper's Lonely Hearts Club Band")
7. "Rock DJ"
8. "Come Undone" (contains elements of "Walk on the Wild Side" and excerpts from "Greatest Day")
9. "Feel"
10. "Angels"

Take That (original lineup)

11. "The Flood"
12. "SOS"
13. "Underground Machine"
14. "Kidz" (contains elements of "Rudebox" and "Clap Your Hands Now")
15. "Pretty Things"
16. When They Were Young Medley:
  1. "A Million Love Songs"
  2. "Babe"
  3. "Everything Changes"
17. "Back for Good"
18. "Pray"
19. "Love Love" (contains elements of "Happy Now")
20. "Never Forget"

Encore

21. "No Regrets" / "Relight My Fire"
22. "Eight Letters"

== Tour dates ==
List of concerts, showing date, city, country, venue, opening acts, tickets sold, number of available tickets and amount of gross revenue
Date	City	Country	Venue	Attendance	Revenue
Europe
27 May 2011	Sunderland	England	Stadium of Light	206,334 / 206,334	$21,600,077
28 May 2011	Sunderland	England	Stadium of Light	206,334 / 206,334	$21,600,077
30 May 2011	Sunderland	England	Stadium of Light	206,334 / 206,334	$21,600,077
31 May 2011	Sunderland	England	Stadium of Light	206,334 / 206,334	$21,600,077
3 June 2011	Manchester	England	Etihad Stadium	443,223 / 443,223	$44,183,145
4 June 2011	Manchester	England	Etihad Stadium	443,223 / 443,223	$44,183,145
5 June 2011	Manchester	England	Etihad Stadium	443,223 / 443,223	$44,183,145
7 June 2011	Manchester	England	Etihad Stadium	443,223 / 443,223	$44,183,145
8 June 2011	Manchester	England	Etihad Stadium	443,223 / 443,223	$44,183,145
10 June 2011	Manchester	England	Etihad Stadium	443,223 / 443,223	$44,183,145
11 June 2011	Manchester	England	Etihad Stadium	443,223 / 443,223	$44,183,145
12 June 2011	Manchester	England	Etihad Stadium	443,223 / 443,223	$44,183,145
14 June 2011	Cardiff	Wales	Principality Stadium	129,069 / 129,069	$13,473,534
15 June 2011	Cardiff	Wales	Principality Stadium	129,069 / 129,069	$13,473,534
18 June 2011	Dublin	Ireland	Croke Park	154,828 / 154,828	$18,217,500
19 June 2011	Dublin	Ireland	Croke Park	154,828 / 154,828	$18,217,500
22 June 2011	Glasgow	Scotland	Hampden Park	154,588 / 154,588	$16,224,812
23 June 2011	Glasgow	Scotland	Hampden Park	154,588 / 154,588	$16,224,812
24 June 2011	Glasgow	Scotland	Hampden Park	154,588 / 154,588	$16,224,812
27 June 2011	Birmingham	England	Villa Park	94,694 / 94,694	$9,763,108
28 June 2011	Birmingham	England	Villa Park	94,694 / 94,694	$9,763,108
30 June 2011	London	England	Wembley Stadium	623,737 / 623,737	$61,713,184
1 July 2011	London	England	Wembley Stadium	623,737 / 623,737	$61,713,184
2 July 2011	London	England	Wembley Stadium	623,737 / 623,737	$61,713,184
4 July 2011	London	England	Wembley Stadium	623,737 / 623,737	$61,713,184
5 July 2011	London	England	Wembley Stadium	623,737 / 623,737	$61,713,184
6 July 2011	London	England	Wembley Stadium	623,737 / 623,737	$61,713,184
8 July 2011	London	England	Wembley Stadium	623,737 / 623,737	$61,713,184
9 July 2011	London	England	Wembley Stadium	623,737 / 623,737	$61,713,184
12 July 2011	Milan	Italy	San Siro	371,500 / 370,500	$38,078,750
15 July 2011	Copenhagen	Denmark	Parken Stadium	371,500 / 370,500	$38,078,750
18 July 2011	Amsterdam	Netherlands	Johan Cruyff Arena	371,500 / 370,500	$38,078,750
22 July 2011	Hamburg	Germany	Volksparkstadion	371,500 / 370,500	$38,078,750
25 July 2011	Düsseldorf	Germany	Merkur Spiel-Arena	371,500 / 370,500	$38,078,750
29 July 2011	Munich	Germany	Olympiastadion	371,500 / 370,500	$38,078,750
TOTAL				2,178,028 / 2,178,028 (100%)	$223,264,167

Cancellations and rescheduled shows

16 July 2011	Copenhagen, Denmark	Parken Stadium	Cancelled

== Home media ==
Progress Live was filmed on 10 and 11 June 2011 at Etihad Stadium in Manchester and was released on DVD and Blu-ray on 21 November 2011.

A 'highlight' version of the concert was broadcast on BBC1 on 18 December 2011.

== Critical response ==
The tour had a positive reaction from critics, media and fans alike. Sky News praised the show commenting that "Take That [had] lived up to the hype surrounding their reunion with Robbie Williams as they kicked off their sell-out tour." Dave Simpson of The Guardian bestowed the highest award of 5 stars to the tour as he praised the achievement of the group by stating "Grins and a group hug later, the band upstaged their jawdropping visuals with the sight of five men performing the classic pop anthems that made them – Pray, Relight My Fire, and Back For Good – and dancing and smiling like they'd never been away." He ended his review by commenting that when "the quintet sang 'Never Forget' in front of an illuminated robot so tall it towered above the stadium, it felt like that almost mythical event: a once in a lifetime pop experience."

== Show incidents ==
Mark Owen and Howard Donald were both trapped on a stage robot during a concert at Etihad Stadium in Manchester on 4 June 2011. The pair were meant to be lowered to the stage on the palms of the group's giant robot man, Om, but the mechanics failed. Consequently, they were stuck singing "Love Love" The three metres (10 ft) above the rest of the band. Ladders were used to rescue Mark Owen so he could continue his performance. Howard Donald was forced to sing lead vocals for the next track, "Never Forget", his only solo performance, while still stuck on the robot before being helped down himself. A statement from the group read: "The mechanical man did stop in motion at the end of Love Love but the matter was resolved and by the end of the show he was standing tall again. Howard Donald was stuck singing Never Forget on a mechanical robot. There is no guarantee that with a mechanical structure the size of Om, there will be no recurrence at some point but all seems fine now."

During the 2011 Progress Tour, 16 July concert at the sold-out Parken Stadium in Copenhagen, Denmark was cancelled only a few hours before the beginning of the show. It was announced that Robbie Williams had caught a severe stomach infection, and was (in spite of treatment attempts) advised by doctors not to go on stage. Take That therefore decided to cancel the event, feeling the fans would not be satisfied with not having Williams on stage. This was the first time Take That had ever cancelled a concert.

== Charts ==
Progress Live was released on DVD and Blu-ray throughout Europe beginning on 19 November 2011 and debuted at number 1 in the UK and Ireland, whilst also appearing at number 2 in Italy and Germany. On the first two days on sale in the UK the tour DVD sold "twice as much as the entire music DVD chart combined." The first week sales in the UK totalled 127,359, followed by a further 72,715 copies the next week.

DVDs Chart (2011)	Peak position
Denmark Music DVD Top 10	3
Dutch Music DVD Chart	1
German Music DVD Top 20	2
Irish Music DVD Chart	1
Italian Music DVD chart	2
UK Music DVD Chart	1

=== Year-end charts ===
Chart (2011)	Position
Dutch Music DVD Chart	46
Ireland Music DVD Chart	3

== See also ==
- List of fastest-selling concert tours
- List of highest-grossing concert series at a single venue
- List of most-attended concert series at a single venue
