= The Greatest Day – Take That Present: The Circus Live =

Live album by Take That
- Released: 30 November 2009
- Recorded: July–September 2009
- Venues: Wembley Stadium, London; Abbey Road Studios, London
- Genres: Pop; pop rock
- Length: 122:36
- Label: Polydor
- Producer: John Shanks

Take That chronology
The Circus (2008)	The Greatest Day – Take That Present: The Circus Live (2009)	Progress (2010)

Alternative cover
- Promo sleeve

The Greatest Day – Take That Present: The Circus Live is the ninth album and the reboot by English pop band Take That. It is the first of their three live albums, and has to date been released only in the UK. It was accompanied by a similar DVD release.

== Background and promotion ==
The album was released on 30 November 2009. No singles were released from the album, although "Hold Up a Light", the fifth single to be released from Take That's previous album, The Circus, encouraged fans to purchase the live album. The video for "Hold Up a Light" featured footage of the band live on the Wembley Leg of the tour, also promoting the album itself. To date, the album has only been released in the UK and Ireland.

The album became the fastest-selling live album since 1994, selling over 123,000 copies in its first week. This was Take That's last album as a four-piece before Robbie Williams returned to the group in 2010.

A DVD, featuring footage of the concert itself, was released on 23 November 2009. This was followed by the audio recording a week later. The DVD topped the music DVD chart, with the audio recording placing #3 in the UK Albums Chart. The video of "Hold Up a Light" was premiered on The One Show on 12 November 2009.

== Critical reception ==
Professional ratings
Review scores
Source	Rating
Digital Spy	4/5 stars
The Times	4/5 stars

The album was received well, with positive reviews. BBC News said "The album was a fresh burst of energy, keeping fans of Take That happy while a new album is being written." Digital Spy also reviewed it as 'almost perfect'.

== Commercial reception ==
The Greatest Day sold 98,000 copies on its first day of release. This was roughly 35,000 copies below the first-day sales of their previous album, The Circus. The album peaked at number three on the UK Albums Chart, and was certified Platinum in Ireland in December 2009. As of December 2011, the album had sold 514,403 copies in the UK.

== Track listing ==
Disc one
The Circus – Live at Wembley

1. "Greatest Day" – 4:18
2. "Hello" – 3:49
3. "Pray" – 4:00
4. "Back for Good" – 4:01
5. "The Garden" – 5:18
6. "Shine" – 3:46
7. "Up All Night" – 3:58
8. "How Did It Come to This" – 4:07
9. "The Circus" – 3:36
10. "What Is Love" – 5:55
11. "Said It All" – 4:07
12. "Never Forget" – 5:28
13. "Patience" – 3:20
14. "Relight My Fire" – 4:34
15. "Hold Up a Light" – 4:29
16. "Rule the World" – 5:42

Disc two
In Session – At Abbey Road

1. "The Garden" – 4:54
2. "How Did It Come to This" – 2:42
3. "Greatest Day" – 3:24
4. "Up All Night" – 3:22
5. "Patience" – 3:20
6. "What Is Love" – 3:42
7. "The Circus" – 3:47
8. "Shine" – 3:42
9. "Rule the World" – 3:54
10. "Julie" – 3:54
11. "Said It All" – 4:17

== Charts ==
=== Weekly charts ===
Chart (2009)	Position
Irish Albums (IRMA)	16
Scottish Albums (OCC)	3
UK Albums (OCC)	3

=== Year-end charts ===
Chart (2009)	Peak position
UK Albums (OCC)	27

== Certifications ==
Region	Certification	Certified units/sales
Ireland (IRMA)	Platinum	15,000^{^}
United Kingdom (BPI)	Platinum	514,403
^{^} Shipments figures based on certification alone.

== Release history ==
Region	Date	Label	Format
United Kingdom	30 November 2009	Polydor	CD, digital download
