= Hey Boy (Take That song) =

Single by Take That

from the album III (2015 edition)
- Released: 16 October 2015
- Recorded: 2015
- Genre: Synth-pop, disco
- Length: 3:43
- Label: Polydor
- Songwriter(s): Gary Barlow; Mark Owen; Howard Donald; Jamie Norton; Ben Mark
- Producer(s): Greg Kurstin

Take That singles chronology
"Higher Than Higher" (2015)	"Hey Boy" (2015)	"Cry" (2016)

Music video
- "Hey Boy" on YouTube

"Hey Boy" is a song by English pop group Take That. It was released through Polydor Records on 16 October 2015 as the fourth single from the seventh studio album, III, originally released in 2014, although this song only appears on the 2015 Edition. The song was written by Take That and produced by Greg Kurstin and features Mark Owen, Gary Barlow and Howard Donald on lead vocals.

== Background ==
On completion of Take That's sell out European tour, Take That Live 2015, the band announced they would be re-releasing their number one-album, III, with 4 new songs. "Hey Boy", one of these new songs, was announced as the fourth single from the album in advance of the record. The single follows an electro-pop style that the band adopt in III with Howard Donald describing the single as the "most excited" he has been about a release in a "long time".

== Live performances ==
Take That performed the single live for the first time on the day it was released to radio on 16 October 2015. The band performed the single on TFI Friday, the first time the band had played on the show.

== Music video ==
The music video for "Hey Boy" was filmed in New York City and features the band dressed up as 70s pop stars walking through the streets and into a nightclub while performing the song.

== Critical reception ==
The single received positive reviews upon its release, with Entertainment Focus calling it "an 80s influenced track featuring chunky synths and a big chorus." The Manchester Evening News called it "uptempo and catchy" continuing by saying that "'Hey Boy' is in the same vein as the winning formula of 'These Days', the song that brought us all onto the dancefloor at weddings this summer." The review concluded by stating that "it has a driving bassline and lyrics to sing along with in the car. What's not to love?"

== Personnel ==
- Gary Barlow – co-lead vocals
- Mark Owen – co-lead vocals
- Howard Donald – co-lead vocals

== Track listing ==
- Digital download
1. "Hey Boy" – 3:43
- UK CD single
1. "Hey Boy" – 3:43

Other versions

- 7th Heaven Club Mix – 7:38
- 7th Heaven Radio Edit – 3:54

== Chart performance ==
=== Weekly charts ===
Chart (2015)	Peak position
Scotland (OCC)	31
UK Singles (OCC)	56

== Release history ==
Country	Date	Format	Label
United Kingdom	16 October 2015	Digital download	Polydor Records
United Kingdom	13 November 2015	CD single	Polydor Records
