= Progressed (EP) =

Studio album (reissue) / EP by Take That
- Released: 13 June 2011
- Recorded: 2009–2010
- Studios: Abbey Road Studios (London, United Kingdom); Sarm West Studios, (London); Electric Lady Studios (New York City, United States)
- Genres: Pop; electropop; rock; alternative rock
- Length: 34:58
- Label: Polydor
- Producer: Stuart Price

Take That chronology
Progress (2010)	Progressed (2011)	Progress Live (2011)

Singles from Progressed
- 1. "Love Love" Released: 11 May 2011; 2. "When We Were Young" Released: 11 July 2011

Progressed is the first extended play by English band Take That. The collection was released on 10 June 2011 and features eight previously unreleased tracks packaged alongside Take That's sixth studio album, Progress. It was preceded by the lead single "Love Love" on 11 May. One more single, "When We Were Young", was released from the EP.

== Background ==
Initially it was believed that Robbie Williams would rejoin Take That in a short term capacity for the album Progress which debuted at number 1 in the UK and achieved similar success across Europe, and the subsequent record breaking Progress Live tour. On 19 May 2011 Take That officially confirmed the upcoming release of Progressed, due for release on 13 June 2011 in the United Kingdom, following the release of its first single, "Love Love".

== Critical reception ==
Professional ratings
Review scores
Source	Rating
Digital Spy	4/5 stars
The Independent	3/5 stars
Q-music	8/10 stars

Progressed received positive reviews from music critics upon its release.

Nick Levine of BBC Music similarly reviewed the album positively, concluding that the collection is "a fine Progress-complementing EP from the 10-legged national treasure."

The Independent awarded Progressed 3 stars, calling the collection a "galumphing disco electropop whose swaggering synth riffs on 'Love Love' and occasional dubstep/electro moves, as on the intro to 'Man', are swept up by standard stomp-beats" whilst Q believed it was "a bold step to add to the biggest selling album of the year but one that ultimately pays off".

Heat reviewed the album positively, summarising: "all in all, we have to say this album is utterly weird and wonderful and the perfect extension to Take That's defiant Progress album of 2010. Progressed is a winner in our book."

Lewis Corner of Digital Spy praised the new material and felt that "the self-penned collection proves once again why Take That's comeback was better than everyone else's – by out-growing the stereotypical boyband branding to become a group of credible and genuinely artistic group of musicians."

== Track listing ==
All tracks are written by Gary Barlow, Howard Donald, Jason Orange, Mark Owen and Robbie Williams and produced by Stuart Price, with additional songwriting on "Eight Letters" by Midge Ure, Chris Cross, Warren Cann and Billy Currie.

Progressed – CD1
No.	Title	Lead vocals	Length
1.	"When We Were Young"	Williams; Barlow	4:34
2.	"Man"	Barlow; Owen	4:39
3.	"Love Love"	Barlow; Owen	3:43
4.	"The Day the Work Is Done"	Owen; Barlow	4:04
5.	"Beautiful"	Barlow	4:14
6.	"Don't Say Goodbye"	Barlow	3:54
7.	"Aliens"	Donald	4:48
8.	"Wonderful World"	Orange; Owen	4:58

Progress – CD2
No.	Title	Lead vocals	Length
9.	"The Flood"	Williams; Barlow	4:49
10.	"SOS"	Owen; Williams	3:44
11.	"Wait"	Williams; Barlow; Donald	4:15
12.	"Kidz"	Owen; Barlow	4:42
13.	"Pretty Things"	Williams; Barlow	4:03
14.	"Happy Now"	Williams; Barlow	4:03
15.	"Underground Machine"	Williams	4:15
16.	"What Do You Want from Me?"	Owen	4:37
17.	"Affirmation"	Donald	3:54
18.	"Eight Letters"	Barlow; Williams	4:41
19.	"Flowerbed" (hidden track)	Orange	3:48

== Personnel ==
Adapted from liner notes.

=== Musicians ===
- Gary Barlow – keyboards, programming
- Karl Brazil – drums (tracks 1, 3, 4)
- Stephen Lipson – mandolin (track 1)
- Ben Mark – guitar (track 1, 3, 5, 7)
- Stuart Price – bass guitar (tracks 1–3, 5, 7), guitar (1, 7, 8), keyboards, programming
- London Studio Orchestra – strings (tracks 1, 4, 6, 8)
- Perry Montague-Mason (tracks 1, 4, 8), Everton Nelson (6) – leaders

=== Production ===
- Stuart Price – producer, mixing engineer
- Dave Emery – assistant mixing engineer (track 6)
- Ryan Carline – engineer
- Noah Goldstein, Mike Houge, Andrew Kitchen, Ghian Wright – assistant engineers
- Wil Malone – strings arranger and conductor
- Perry Montague-Mason – orchestra contractor and supervisor
- Richard Lancaster – string engineer
- Tim Young – mastering engineer

== Charts ==
=== Weekly charts ===
Chart (2011)	Peak position
Danish Albums (Tracklisten)	1
Dutch Albums (MegaCharts)	21
German Albums (Offizielle Top 100)	11
Irish Albums (IRMA)^{[A]}	2
Italian Albums (FIMI)	25
Italian Albums (Musica e Dischi)	38
Scottish Albums (OCC)^{[A]}	1
South Korean Albums (Gaon Chart)	81
Spanish Albums (PROMUSICAE)	46
Taiwanese Albums (G-Music)	11
UK Albums (OCC)^{[A]}	1

- A In certain territories, Progressed charted in conjunction with Progress under the same title.

=== Year-end charts ===
Chart (2011)	Position
Danish Albums (Hitlisten)	57

== Release history ==
Region	Date	Format
Ireland	10 June 2011	CD, digital download
United Kingdom	13 June 2011	CD, digital download
Italy	14 June 2011	CD, digital download
Denmark	15 June 2011	CD, digital download
Australia	17 June 2011	CD, digital download
Germany	17 June 2011	CD, digital download
Brazil	28 June 2011	CD, digital download
