= Higher Than Higher =

Single by Take That

from the album III
- Released: 8 June 2015
- Recorded: 2014
- Genre: Pop
- Length: 4:06
- Label: Polydor
- Songwriters: Gary Barlow; Mark Owen; Howard Donald; Mattias Larsson; Robin Fredriksson; Joe Janiak
- Producer: Mattman & Robin

Take That singles chronology
"Let in the Sun" (2015)	"Higher Than Higher" (2015)	"Hey Boy" (2015)

Audio video
- "Higher Than Higher" on YouTube

"Higher Than Higher" is a song by the English pop group Take That. It was released by Polydor Records on 8 June 2015 as the third single from their seventh studio album, III (2014). It was written by Take That, Mattias Larsson, Robin Fredriksson and Joe Janiak, and produced by Mattman & Robin with Gary Barlow on lead vocals.

The song entered the UK Physical Singles Chart at number one shortly after release.

== Background ==
On 28 April 2015, it was announced that "Higher Than Higher" would be the third single from III. It was officially released as a CD single on 8 June 2015.

== Critical reception ==
The single received positive reviews on its release, with Music News calling it a "trademark soaring smash" and The Guardian commenting that the single is "lilting and uplifting in a way that avoids pop's obsession with heavy-handed didacticism". The paper praised its production, calling it "spacious and precise, with each different element – the marching-band beat, the acoustic strums, the echoey synths – all meticulously layered".

== Chart performance ==
"Higher Than Higher" entered the UK Physical Singles Chart at number one on 14 June 2015 and remained in the charts for four weeks.

== Personnel ==
- Gary Barlow – lead vocals
- Howard Donald – backing vocals
- Mark Owen – backing vocals

== Track listing ==
- UK CD single
1. "Higher Than Higher" – 4:06
2. "Higher Than Higher" (instrumental) – 4:06

Other Versions

- Cahill Club Mix - 6:05
- Cahill Radio Edit - 3:28

== Charts ==
Chart (2015)	Peak position
Belgium (Ultratip Bubbling Under Flanders)	86
UK Physical Singles (OCC)	1

== Release history ==
Country	Date	Format	Label
United Kingdom	8 June 2015	CD single	Polydor Records
