= The Circus (Take That album) =

Studio album by Take That
- Released: 1 December 2008
- Recorded: 2008
- Studios: Sarm Studios, Northern Sky Studios and Abbey Road Studios (London, England); Henson Recording Studios (Hollywood, California, United States).
- Genres: Pop rock; alternative rock
- Length: 51:03
- Label: Polydor
- Producer: John Shanks

Take That chronology
Beautiful World (2006)	The Circus (2008)	The Greatest Day – Take That Present: The Circus Live (2009)

Singles from The Circus
- 1. "Greatest Day" Released: 24 November 2008; 2. "Up All Night" Released: 2 March 2009; 3. "The Garden" Released: 20 March 2009; 4. "Said It All" Released: 15 June 2009; 5. "Hold Up a Light" Released: 14 December 2009

The Circus is the fifth studio album by English pop band Take That. It was released in the United Kingdom on 1 December 2008. The album was their second, and also their last, as a four-piece, as founding member Robbie Williams returned for their sixth studio album Progress (2010) then left again in 2014 alongside Jason Orange.

The Circus debuted at number 1 on the UK Albums Chart and was the second best-selling album of 2008 in the UK, selling over 1.5 million copies. The album's lead single "Greatest Day" became Take That's eleventh number one. Four further singles were released which failed to match the success of "Greatest Day": "Up All Night", "The Garden", "Said It All" and "Hold Up a Light".

== Release ==
In the United Kingdom, the album was released on 1 December 2008, when Britney Spears' sixth album, also titled Circus, released on the same day. Take That's manager said the album's title choice was a coincidence, and that the band had worked "months in advance" and would not be changing the title. He also elaborated: "The boys have worked on this for months, like Britney, and we certainly won't be changing the title", and that "I doubt there will be confusion. Fans will either ask for the new record by Take That or Britney Spears".

== Singles ==
Take That released their first single from the album, "Greatest Day", on 24 November 2008, which peaked at number one in the UK. The second single "Up All Night" was released on 2 March 2009 and peaked at number 14. The third single "The Garden", was released in Germany, the Netherlands and Australia on 20 March 2009, though it also peaked at number 97 in the UK on download sales. The video for the song was shot at the Greenwich Maritime Museum, South London. The fourth single to be taken from the album, "Said It All", was released in June 2009 and peaked at number 9 in the UK. "Hold Up a Light" was the fifth and final single taken from the album, released to promote Take That's first live album The Greatest Day – Take That Present: The Circus Live.

== Critical reception ==
Professional ratings
Aggregate scores
Source	Rating
Metacritic	64/100
Review scores
Source	Rating
AllMusic	3/5 stars
BBC Music	(positive)
Digital Spy	4/5 stars
The Evening Standard	4/5 stars
The Guardian	3/5 stars
The Sunday Times	4/5 stars
Time Out	2/6 stars
The Times	3/5 stars
Yahoo! Music UK	(7/10)

BBC Music said: "A stunning album, Take That are the vintage champagne of pop fizzing with playful bubbles and happily maturing with age". The Sunday Mercury said: "Like its predecessor, The Circus boasts one killer track. Hit single Greatest Day is as pop-perfect now as Patience was back in 2006." Yahoo! Music UK stated that "as with its predecessor Beautiful World, The Circus possesses well crafted pop songs, with faultless production".

The Sunday Times stated that "The Circus will, no doubt, achieve similar sales, with songs as propulsive and swollen with giant choruses as The Garden, Greatest Day, Said It All and the apparently Amy Winehouse-referencing "How Did It Come to This". The Times said "Take That's return is the gold standard: a hugely successful second coming from a band determined not to fritter away their reserves of goodwill."

== Promotion ==
Following the release of the album, Take That announced plans for their first full-length stadium tour titled "Take That Present: The Circus Live" in 2009. The tour became the fastest selling tour in UK history selling £35m of tickets in one day (600,000 in less than 5 hours), beating the previous record set by Michael Jackson for his Bad tour in 1987 (though Jackson reclaimed the record soon after when he announced his residency at the O2 Arena in London shortly before his death). The Script acted as special guests at their performance at Croke Park. Take That also presented their own TV show Take That Come to Town, a variety show where they performed some of their biggest hits and new material from The Circus, which aired on 7 December 2008 on ITV.

To launch the album's release in Paris, the band performed at a lavish nightclub exclusively for the first time in 12 years in the city on 2 December 2008. The performance included acrobats, trapeze artists, stilt-walkers and jugglers, all in keeping with the circus theme.

== Commercial performance ==
The album reached number one in Ireland and the UK with The Circus selling 133,000 copies on its first day of release in the UK. It then sold one million copies in 18 days. The album reached the top of the UK album charts on 7 December 2008 with total first-week sales of 432,490, the third highest opening sales week in UK history. The album debuted at #3 on the Irish Albums Chart and a week later rose to number one. On Friday 19 December 2008, the album had sold 1 million copies sold by its 19th day in UK shops, making it the second fastest album in the UK to reach 1 million copies, behind Oasis's Be Here Now in 1997.

The album stayed on top of the UK Albums Chart for five weeks and became one of the biggest selling albums of 2008 in the UK. The album has been certified double platinum in Europe (including the UK and Ireland) for sales in excess of two million copies, and was the 27th best-selling album worldwide in 2008 according to the IFPI. Since its release in December 2008, the album has spent 73 weeks (one year, five months and one week) in the top 100 of the UK Albums Chart.

== Track listing ==
All tracks are written by Gary Barlow, Mark Owen, Howard Donald and Jason Orange, and produced by John Shanks; additional songwriters are noted below.

Standard edition
No.	Title	Writer(s)	Lead vocals	Length
1.	"The Garden"		Owen; Barlow; Orange; Donald	5:07
2.	"Greatest Day"		Barlow	3:59
3.	"Hello"	Steve Robson	Owen	3:30
4.	"Said It All"	Robson	Barlow; Owen	4:15
5.	"Julie"	Robson	Owen	3:53
6.	"The Circus"		Barlow	3:33
7.	"How Did It Come to This"	Jamie Norton; Ben Mark	Orange	3:10
8.	"Up All Night"	Norton; Mark	Owen	3:24
9.	"What Is Love"		Donald	3:27
10.	"You"		Barlow	4:13
11.	"Hold Up a Light"	Norton; Mark	Owen	4:27
12.	"Here"	Olly Knights; Gale Paridjanian	Donald	4:28
13.	"She Said" (hidden track)		Barlow	2:33

Japanese edition bonus track
No.	Title	Lead vocals	Length
13.	"Sleepwalking" ("Greatest Day" B-side)	Barlow	3:46
14.	"She Said" (hidden track)	Barlow	2:33

== Personnel ==
=== Take That ===
- Gary Barlow – vocals, acoustic piano, keyboards
- Howard Donald – vocals
- Jason Orange – vocals, acoustic guitar
- Mark Owen – vocals

=== Musicians ===
- John Shanks – keyboards, guitars, bass
- Ryan Carline – additional keyboards and programming
- Jamie Norton – acoustic piano (11)
- Ben Mark – electric guitar (9)
- Jeff Rothschild – programming, drums
- Wil Malone – string and brass arrangements, conductor
- Perry Montague-Mason – orchestra leader, orchestra director (8)
- London Studio Orchestra – strings and brass
- Mark Nightingale – tenor trombone (1, 8)
- Andy Wood – trombone (1, 8)
- John Barclay – trumpet (1, 8)
- Derek Watkins – trumpet (1, 8)
- Owen Slade – tuba (1, 8)
- Philip Sheppard – cello (5)
- Matthew Ward – violin (5)

=== Production ===
- John Shanks – producer
- Jeff Rothschild – recording, mixing
- Graham Archer – additional engineer
- Ryan Carline – additional engineer
- Richard Lancaster – assistant engineer
- Stephen Marcussen – mastering at Marcussen Mastering (Hollywood, California, USA)
- Shari Sutcliffe – production coordinator
- Studio Fury – art direction, design
- Rick Guest – photography
- Jonathan Wild and 10 Management – management

== Charts ==
=== Weekly charts ===
Chart (2008–09)	Peak position
Argentine Albums (CAPIF)	11
Australian Albums (ARIA)	180
Austrian Albums (Ö3 Austria)	42
Belgian Albums (Ultratop Flanders)	94
Danish Albums (Hitlisten)	13
Dutch Albums (Album Top 100)	68
European Albums Chart	5
German Albums (Offizielle Top 100)	14
Greek Albums (IFPI Greece)	21
Irish Albums (IRMA)	1
Italian Albums (FIMI)	32
Italian Albums (Musica e Dischi)	48
Japanese Albums (Oricon)	197
Norwegian Albums (VG-lista)	38
Scottish Albums (Official Charts)	1
Spanish Albums (Promusicae)	27
Swedish Albums (Sverigetopplistan)	25
Swiss Albums (Schweizer Hitparade)	22
Taiwanese Albums (G-Music)	16
UK Albums (Official Charts)	1

=== Year-end charts ===
Chart (2008)	Position
Irish Albums (IRMA)	4
UK Albums (OCC)	2
Chart (2009)	Position
European Albums (Billboard)	25
Irish Albums (IRMA)	14
UK Albums (OCC)	13
Chart (2010)	Position
UK Albums (OCC)	133

=== Decade-end charts ===
Chart (2000–2009)	Position
UK Albums Chart	24

== Certifications ==
Region	Certification	Certified units/sales
Denmark (IFPI Danmark)	Gold	15,000^{^}
Ireland (IRMA)	8× Platinum	120,000^{^}
United Kingdom (BPI)	7× Platinum	2,200,000
Summaries
Europe (IFPI)	2× Platinum	2,000,000^{*}
^{*} Sales figures based on certification alone.^{^} Shipments figures based on certification alone.

== Release history ==
Region	Date	Label	Format	Catalog number
Germany	28 November 2008	Polydor	Compact Disc	B001JCDWAS
Germany	28 November 2008	Polydor	Deluxe Edition	B001IA46DI
United Kingdom	1 December 2008	Polydor	Compact Disc	1787444
United Kingdom	1 December 2008	Polydor	Deluxe Edition	1790124
United States	2 December 2008	Universal International	Compact Disc	B001IA46D8
United States	2 December 2008	Universal International	Deluxe Edition	B001IA46DI
Japan	3 December 2008	Universal International	Compact Disc	UICP1101
Brazil	17 December 2008	Universal International	Compact Disc	602517919914
