= When We Were Young (Take That song) =

Single by Take That

from the album Progressed
- Released: 11 July 2011
- Genre: Pop rock, acoustic rock
- Length: 4:34
- Label: Polydor
- Songwriters: Gary Barlow; Howard Donald; Jason Orange; Mark Owen; Robbie Williams
- Producer: Stuart Price

Take That singles chronology
"Love Love" (2011)	"When We Were Young" (2011)	"These Days" (2014)

Music video
- "When We Were Young" on YouTube

"When We Were Young" is the second and final single by English pop group Take That from the band's first EP, Progressed. It acted as the theme song in the feature film adaptation of The Three Musketeers, which premiered in the United Kingdom on 14 October 2011. The single was released to radio on 11 July 2011 and was released in the United Kingdom as a digital download on 22 August 2011.

The song is the last to feature Jason Orange and Robbie Williams and features Williams and Gary Barlow on lead vocals. The band also has never performed it live.

== Background ==
On 7 July 2011, it was announced on Take That's official website that "When We Were Young" would be the next single from Progressed, and that it would also serve as the theme song for the new film adaptation of The Three Musketeers, directed by Paul W. S. Anderson.

Gary Barlow stated that the song was written after Take That watched a private screening of the film. Barlow stated "The film is visually so rich and beautiful that our main challenge was to then match it musically. We've returned to guitars, real pianos and a conventional song structure to achieve this. We also thought that the Musketeers reminded us of ourselves."

== Critical reception ==
In his review of Take That's Progressed, Gavin Martin of The Daily Mirror concluded that "the trad Barlow ballad setting of 'When We Were Young' ... extends the original album's balancing act between dignified nostalgia and commercially crafted experimentation." Music News Daily gave the song a positive review stating that it "is a song best listened to when in a reflective mood. Williams takes lead vocals duty once more, with Barlow again on 2nd lead. It’s a beautifully crafted song, which is bound to evoke bitter-sweet memories for listeners and it deserves to be a huge hit."

Heat praised the song by stating that "When We Were Young kicks the album off in a mid-tempo way, with a very catchy intro. It comes with a big chorus and is a bubbling mix of TT old and new."

== Music video ==
The official music video was released on 14 July 2011. The video was shot in color and color-corrected to a uniform cold blue tint. It features Take That performing the song inside an empty Wembley Stadium after one of their Progress Live concerts, with each member in a different location of the ground.

Robbie Williams opens the video on the b stage, surrounded by ticker tape, trying to grab it as the wind blows through the stadium. Gary Barlow is shown to be sitting in the seats looking down upon the stage as he performs the chorus, whilst Mark Owen, Jason Orange and Howard Donald all look around the stadium contemplating the night before. At the end of the video, they all join together and perform in front of the stage prop of their tour and as the final chorus is sung they join hands and bow to their audience. The video itself was praised by critics for its approach and its sentimental value. The video is the last to feature Jason Orange and Robbie Williams.

== Chart performance ==
The song debuted at number eighty-eight on the UK Singles Chart the week it was released, as an album track download from Progressed without promotion or a physical release.

== Personnel ==
- Gary Barlow – co-lead vocals
- Robbie Williams – co-lead vocals, backing vocals
- Howard Donald – backing vocals
- Jason Orange – backing vocals
- Mark Owen – backing vocals

== Track listing ==
- Digital download
1. "When We Were Young" (album version) – 4:34
- UK promo single
1. "When We Were Young" (single version) – 4:06
2. "When We Were Young" (single instrumental) – 4:05
- UK iTunes package
1. "When We Were Young" – 4:34
2. "When We Were Young" (music video) – 4:51

== Charts ==
Chart (2011)	Peak position
Scottish Singles Sales (Official Charts)	95
UK Singles (Official Charts)	88
UK Airplay (Music Week)	20

== Release history ==
Country	Date	Format	Label
United Kingdom	22 August 2011	Digital download	Polydor Records
Worldwide	23 August 2011	Digital download	Polydor Records
