= Happy Now (Take That song) =

Single by Take That

from the album Progress
- Released: 18 March 2011
- Recorded: Sarm West Studios (London, United Kingdom); Electric Lady Studios (New York City, United States); Abbey Road Studios (London, United Kingdom)
- Genre: Pop; synth-pop; house; electro-rock
- Length: 3:58
- Label: Polydor
- Songwriters: Gary Barlow; Howard Donald; Jason Orange; Mark Owen; Robbie Williams
- Producer: Stuart Price

Take That singles chronology
| "Kidz" (2011) | "Happy Now" (2011) | "Love Love" (2011) |

Music video
- Take That / Fake That "Happy Now" on YouTube

"Happy Now" is a song by English pop group Take That from their sixth studio album, Progress. The song features Gary Barlow and Robbie Williams performing lead vocals. The song was released as the third single from the album, mainly to promote the group's Comic Relief sketch, "Fake That".

== Background ==
The song was first announced as the album's third single when it was revealed that the band would perform the song live on the Comic Relief telethon on Red Nose Day 2011 – Friday 18 March. The group performed the song at 9:15pm, following which an announcement was made that a video for the track would premiere on the same night at 10:30pm. The video premiered on digital music channels on 6 April 2011, which subsequently was the same date that the track was placed on the BBC Radio 1 B-Playlist, on 6 April 2011.

In the United Kingdom, the single was only released digitally, though a promotional physical release of the single, complete with remixes from Paul Oakenfold and Benny Benassi, was made available in Europe.

== Critical reception ==
The Guardian praised the "glam stomp" sound of the song. Virgin Media praised the production: "While this could easily have been traditional Take That fare, Stuart Price touches it up with a trendy electro fringe."

== Music video ==
The official music video for "Happy Now" was recorded at the BBC Television Studios during February 2011. The video premiered on the Red Nose Day 2011 telethon on 18 March and Take That also performed the number live.

The video begins with the band sitting as a Judges' panel in a small room. The band bring on participants who are hoping to be formed into the group's ultimate tribute act, Fake That. Many bands appear on stage, including a group of youths, a mixed gender group and five OAPs. The band are then introduced to a five-piece made up of comedians Alan Carr, James Corden, John Bishop, David Walliams and Catherine Tate, impersonating Owen, Barlow, Williams, Donald and Orange respectively. The five comedians appear on stage in the group's outfits from their "Do What U Like" video in 1991. The real Take That heckle them off stage, however, they return disguised as the group from their video for "The Flood", complete with the Progress rowing boat. In similar fashion, they are heckled off; however, they return in outfits from the group's videos for "Pray" and "Back For Good", with each impersonator performing the dance moves of the member of Take That they are pretending to be. Gary Barlow and the rest of the band then agree that the group look good in their "Back For Good" outfits, and decide to make them into Fake That. The real Take That then appear on stage and perform the final piece of the track with them, before leaving what seems to be a television set. In the end, Carr says "Bye, thanks for coming" to them.

== Personnel ==
- Gary Barlow – co-lead vocals
- Robbie Williams – co-lead vocals, backing vocals
- Howard Donald – backing vocals
- Jason Orange – backing vocals
- Mark Owen – backing vocals

== Track listing ==
European promo single

1. "Happy Now" (main version) – 3:56
2. "Happy Now" (live version) – 3:45
3. "Happy Now" (Paul Oakenfold Radio Edit) – 3:31
4. "Happy Now" (Benny Benassi Radio Edit) – 3:52
5. "Happy Now" (Paul Oakenfold Remix) – 7:19
6. "Happy Now" (Benny Benassi Remix) – 7:00

UK iTunes package

1. "Happy Now" (live version) – 3:45
2. "Happy Now" (video) – 4:44
3. "Happy Now" (behind the scenes footage) – 14:18

== Charts ==
| Chart (2011) | Peak position |
|---|---|
| Scottish Singles Sales (Official Charts) | 48 |
| UK Singles (Official Charts) | 52 |
| UK Airplay (Music Week) | 13 |
| UK Singles Downloads (Official Charts) | 52 |

== Release history ==
| Region | Date | Format |
|---|---|---|
| United Kingdom | 18 March 2011 | Digital download |
| Europe | 18 June 2011 | Promotional CD single |
