= Let in the Sun =

Single by Take That

from the album III
- Released: 2 March 2015
- Recorded: 2014
- Genre: Pop
- Length: 3:40
- Label: Polydor
- Songwriter(s): Gary Barlow; Mark Owen; Howard Donald; Edvard Førre Erfjord; Gary Go; Cass Lowe; Henrik Barman Michelsen
- Producer(s): Stuart Price

Take That singles chronology
"These Days" (2014)	"Let in the Sun" (2015)	"Higher Than Higher" (2015)

Music video
- "Let in the Sun" on YouTube

"Let in the Sun" is a song by English pop group Take That. It was released through Polydor Records on 2 March 2015 as the second single from their seventh studio album, III (2014).

The song was written by Take That, Edvard Førre Erfjord, Gary Go, Cass Lowe, and Henrik Barman Michelsen, and produced by Stuart Price and features Gary Barlow on lead vocal.

== Background ==
Upon release of Take That's number one-album, III, "Let in the Sun" was described as the likely second single from the record and a natural progression from the nostalgic and upbeat dance vibe of "These Days". It was described as a mix between Calvin Harris and Mumford & Sons by critics, with Barlow calling the song a "homage to the early years", and Howard Donald raising the prospect of the band taking the single to Ibiza due to its club sound and music style.

== Live performances ==
Take That performed the single for the first time as part of a live set for BBC Radio 2 in December 2014. Take That performed "Let in the Sun" live during the Brit Awards 2015 ceremony.

== Music video ==
The official music video for "Let in the Sun" debuted on Vevo on 23 February 2015, after a series of teaser clips which revealed snippets of the video.

The music video begins with Take That performing the song in darkness, before light begins to creep out of the wall and into the room. As the song continues the wall of light intensifies as it engulfs the band as they walk towards it as the song draws to a close. The video was well received with one critic calling "the visual matched by the overall uplifting vibe of the single".

== Critical reception ==
The single received positive reviews upon release of their UK number 1 album, III with Entertainment Focus calling the single "a nod to Take That's early days with its dance rhythms and uplifting chorus" and The Guardian commenting that "Lyrically it's euphoria with a capital E, Barlow crooning 'Open up, everyone's waiting ... open up your windows and let in the sun' as Edge-style guitars glide epically by. It goes without saying it's incredibly catchy."

RTÉ called the single "a nod to the band's early years of hedonistic party anthems", concluding that "Let in the Sun" is "a straight-up-hands-in-the-air dance floor hit with a huge piano riff that brings in one of the most uplifting choruses on the record."

== Personnel ==
- Gary Barlow – lead vocals
- Mark Owen – backing vocals
- Howard Donald – backing vocals

== Track listing ==
- UK CD single
1. "Let in the Sun" – 3:40
2. "Let in the Sun" (Monsieur Adi remix) – 5:51
3. "Let in the Sun" (instrumental) – 3:52
- Digital download — Live Version
1. "Let in the Sun (live from The BRITs) – 4:01

== Chart performance ==
=== Weekly charts ===
Chart (2015)	Peak position
Belgium (Ultratip Bubbling Under Flanders)	54
Belgium (Ultratip Bubbling Under Wallonia)	37
Scotland (OCC)	69
UK Physical Singles (OCC)	2
UK Singles Downloads (OCC)	93
UK Singles Sales (OCC)	93

== Release history ==
Country	Date	Format	Label
United Kingdom	25 February 2015	Digital download — live version	Polydor Records
United Kingdom	2 March 2015	Digital download	Polydor Records
United Kingdom	9 March 2015	CD single	Polydor Records
