= These Days (Take That song) =

2014 single by Take That

Single by Take That

from the album III
- Released: 14 November 2014
- Recorded: 2014
- Genre: Pop
- Length: 3:52
- Label: Polydor
- Songwriters: Gary Barlow; Mark Owen; Howard Donald; Jamie Norton; Ben Mark
- Producer: Greg Kurstin

Take That singles chronology
"When We Were Young" (2011)	"These Days" (2014)	"Let in the Sun" (2015)

Music video
- "These Days" on YouTube

"These Days" is a song by English pop group Take That. It was released through Polydor Records on 14 November 2014 as the lead single from their seventh studio album, III (2014). The song was written by Take That, Jamie Norton and Ben Mark, and produced by Greg Kurstin.

"These Days" was the first song to feature Take That as a trio following the departures of Jason Orange and Robbie Williams, and features all three members singing joint lead vocal. The song debuted at number one in the United Kingdom, becoming the group's 12th UK number one and 20th top ten hit.

== Background ==
It became known early into the writing process that Jason Orange was unsure whether he would rejoin the band for the new single and album. Gary Barlow admitted that the band had "known for a while that Jay [Jason Orange] was like, 'I don't know if I'm doing this or not'" As time went on, Mark Owen stated that "we hit the point where we could do nothing else", and began writing music with Orange's blessing. The band then went to Los Angeles in May 2014 and locked themselves in a room "for two or three weeks and started to play with sounds" resulting in a much more upbeat energetic song which later became "These Days". Take That later played the song to Orange, who "loved it".

== Critical reception ==
The single received positive reviews upon its first airplay, with Neil McCormick of The Daily Telegraph calling it 'uplifting' and a 'fun and fuzzy comeback'. He concluded by stating, "There is enough hook-laden chutzpah about this comeback to suggest these unlikely survivors of British pop are about to triumph again. If you didn't actually know someone had left the band, you would never guess from listening to 'These Days', although there might just be a message to the deserter in the opening line: "I can see the future coming to you crying with a sadness in your eyes".

The Independent called 'These Days' "an upbeat and energetic dance track with the carpe diem theme rolled out by many an artist: “Tonight we gotta live for/ We gotta live for these days/ Tonight, tonight, we'll remember/ We'll remember these days.” There is also perhaps a sense of nostalgia in the song, as the originally five-strong band sings: “Take me back/ To where it all began.” They conclude that "the lyrics also express a desire to rejuvenate the sound of their heady Nineties heyday. All three - Gary Barlow, Howard Donald and Mark Owen - share vocal duties on the song, a nod to the sound that defined their early years and out-and-out feel-good pop”. Clickmusic described the single as "just as forward-thinking as anything on their last [album], but it's also full of nostalgia for Take That of the 1990s. Among the rippling pop melody and sprawling chorus, this is as much about their past as it is about their future. It's a nod to what they had before and it's full of hope for what lies ahead for them as a trio. As it stands, it's also one of their very best singles."

== Chart performance ==
"These Days" debuted at number one on the UK Singles Chart, knocking Band Aid 30 off the top spot. It became Take That's 12th UK number-one single and their first since the departure of Orange. It also made them the first band in United Kingdom history to have had a number-one single as a five-piece, four-piece and three-piece. The following week, "These Days" sold a further 44,055 copies, taking the total of sales after two weeks to 108,053. The following week, it sold 46,102 copies, taking the total to beyond 150,000 sales in three weeks. The week afterwards the single sold a further 39,565 copies in the United Kingdom. The next week the single sold 44,899 copies, subsequently being certified Silver by the BPI with sales totalling 238,619 After a further 3 weeks in the UK top 30, the single achieved sales in the UK of 301,187. As of February 2015, the single had sold 351,507 copies in the UK alone.

In December 2018, the single was certified Platinum for sales of over 600,000 in the UK.

== Music video ==
The video for "These Days" was based on a concept from Mark Owen which they shot through until the early hours of two days. The music video begins with Take That in bed together before they wake up and get ready for the day ahead. The video shows the band getting spray tanned (a homage to Jason Orange), getting perm haircuts and performing in an empty church while the congregation dance around them. The video is described by Owen as fun and tongue-in-cheek. A source close to the boys said: "It was a three day shoot put into two days so they worked really hard. It was a bonus they didn't have to dress up too much and could stay in the clothes they wore to sleep in!"

== Promotion ==
Take That performed "These Days" for the first time live on The X Factor on the 23 November 2014. They also performed the song on The Graham Norton Show on 28 November and at the BBC Music Awards on 11 December.

== Personnel ==
- Gary Barlow – co-lead vocals
- Howard Donald – co-lead vocals
- Mark Owen – co-lead vocals

== Track listings ==
- Digital download single
1. "These Days" – 3:52
- UK CD single
1. "These Days" – 3:52
2. "These Days" (instrumental) – 3:54

== Charts ==
=== Weekly charts ===
Chart (2014–2015)	Peak position
Belgium (Ultratip Bubbling Under Flanders)	2
Belgian Airplay (Ultratop Flanders)	32
Europe (Euro Digital Song Sales)	5
Europe (European Airplay Chart)	50
Germany (GfK)	31
Hungary (Rádiós Top 40)	7
Ireland (IRMA)	8
Netherlands (Dutch Top 40 Tipparade)	16
Scottish Singles Sales (Official Charts)	1
Slovakia Singles Digital (ČNS IFPI)	23
Slovenia (SloTop50)	50
Switzerland Airplay (Swiss Hitparade)	50
UK Singles (Official Charts)	1
UK Airplay (Music Week)	3

=== Year-end charts ===
Chart (2014)	Position
Hungary (Rádiós Top 40)	91
UK Singles (OCC)	90
Chart (2015)	Position
Hungary (Rádiós Top 40)	76

== Certifications ==
Region	Certification	Certified units/sales
United Kingdom (BPI)	Platinum	600,000^{‡}
^{‡} Sales+streaming figures based on certification alone.

== Release history ==
Country	Date	Format	Label
Germany	14 November 2014	Digital download	Polydor Records
Ireland	21 November 2014	Digital download	Polydor Records
United Kingdom	23 November 2014	Digital download	Polydor Records
Belgium	24 November 2014	Digital download	Polydor Records
Italy	24 November 2014	Digital download	Polydor Records
