= Said It All =

2009 single by Take That

Single by Take That

from the album The Circus
- B-side: "Throwing Stones"
- Released: 15 June 2009
- Recorded: 2008
- Genre: Pop rock
- Length: 4:15 (album version); 3:56 (video edit)
- Label: Polydor
- Songwriters: Gary Barlow; Howard Donald; Jason Orange; Mark Owen; Steve Robson
- Producers: Take That; John Shanks

Take That singles chronology
"The Garden" (2009)	"Said It All" (2009)	"Hold Up a Light" (2009)

Music video
- "Said It All" on YouTube

"Said It All" is a song by English pop band Take That. It is the fourth single from to be taken from their fifth studio album, The Circus (2008).

The single was released in the United Kingdom on 15 June 2009, where it peaked at number nine on the UK Singles Chart and number one on the Scottish Singles Chart. It was their last hit as a four-piece as Robbie Williams would return to the group for the next hit, "The Flood".

== Song information ==
"Said It All" was written by band members Gary Barlow, Howard Donald, Jason Orange and Mark Owen, together with Steve Robson. It was released on 15 June 2009 in the UK. It features Barlow and Owen on lead vocals. The B-side, "Throwing Stones", has Owen singing lead vocals.

== Critical reception ==
Digital Spy's Alex Fletcher described the song as a "swirling mega-ballad with a killer key change."

== Chart performance ==
The single entered the UK Singles Chart at number 74 based on downloads alone, two weeks before the physical release date. "Said It All" peaked at number nine in its third week on the chart, becoming the band's 18th top 10 single in the UK. "Said It All" debuted at number one on the Scottish Singles Chart, becoming the band's eighth number one in that country and their only number-one single that didn't also reach the top spot on the UK Singles Chart. In Ireland the song peaked at number 17 the week of the single's release date.

== Music video ==
The official music video for "Said It All" was premiered on Monday 11 May 2009. The video sees the four band members dressed as clowns preparing for a circus performance. It was directed by Lindy Heymann, who has also worked on videos for Faithless and Suede.

The four members did their own unicycle work after heavy preparation.

== Personnel ==
- Gary Barlow – co-lead vocals, backing vocals
- Mark Owen – co-lead vocals, backing vocals
- Howard Donald – backing vocals
- Jason Orange – backing vocals

== Track listings ==
UK CD single 1

1. "Said It All" – 4:15
2. "Throwing Stones" – 3:19

UK CD single 2

1. "Said It All" – 4:15
2. "Rule the World" (live) – 5:16
3. "Julie" (live) – 4:35

UK DVD single

1. "Said It All" (video) – 3:56
2. "Said It All" (Making of the Video)

== Charts ==
=== Weekly charts ===
Chart (2009)	Peak position
Europe (Eurochart Hot 100)	33
Ireland (IRMA)	17
Scottish Singles Sales (Official Charts)	1
UK Singles (Official Charts)	9
UK Airplay (Music Week)	1

=== Year-end charts ===
Chart (2009)	Position
UK Singles (OCC)	163
UK Airplay (Music Week)	40

== Certifications ==
Region	Certification	Certified units/sales
United Kingdom (BPI)	Silver	200,000^{‡}
^{‡} Sales+streaming figures based on certification alone.

== 2026 version ==
"Said It All (Jax Jones Rework)"

Single by Take That featuring Leony and Jax Jones
- Released: 2 January 2026
- Genre: House
- Length: 3:28
- Label: EMI
- Songwriters: Gary Barlow; Howard Donald; Jason Orange; Mark Owen
- Producer: Jax Jones

Take That singles chronology
"All Wrapped Up" (2024)	"Said It All (Jax Jones Rework)" (2026)	"You're a Superstar" (2026)

Music videos
- "Said It All (feat. Leony) - Jax Jones Rework" on YouTube

"Said It All (Jax Jones Rework)" is a reinterpretation of the original song by English pop group Take That, featuring the band, Jax Jones and Leony. It was released on 2 January 2026 in anticipation of their upcoming tour, The Circus Live – Summer 2026.

== Background ==
The idea first came to light in late 2023 after Jax Jones and Gary Barlow met and discussed a collaboration. The finished work features a duet between Barlow and German singer Leony with instrumentation and production used to bring out a euphoric sound whilst retaining the melancholic grand feel of the original.

== Charts ==
Chart (2026)	Peak position
UK Singles Downloads (Official Charts)	37
UK Singles Sales (OCC)	42
