= Progress (Take That album) =

Studio album by Take That
- Released: 15 November 2010
- Recorded: September 2009 – August 2010
- Studios: Abbey Road Studios (London, United Kingdom); Electric Lady Studios (New York City, United States); Future Studios (London); Real World Studios (Box, United Kingdom); The Record Plant (Los Angeles, United States); Sarm West Studios (London); Tracques (London); The Village (Los Angeles)
- Genres: Pop; electropop; pop rock
- Length: 47:13
- Label: Polydor
- Producer: Stuart Price

Take That chronology
The Greatest Day – Take That Present: The Circus Live (2009)	Progress (2010)	Progressed (2011)

Singles from Progress
- 1. "The Flood" Released: 15 October 2010; 2. "Kidz" Released: 20 February 2011; 3. "Happy Now" Released: 18 March 2011

Progress is the sixth studio album by English band Take That. It is the band's first album since Nobody Else (1995) to feature the original five-piece, with the return of Robbie Williams since his initial departure from the band in 1995, joined only on this album, and the final album to feature Jason Orange due to his departure from the band in 2014, which marked the final album to feature the original formation. The album was released in the United Kingdom on 15 November 2010.

The album received positive reviews, with most critics commending the influence of electronic music and synthesizers on the album. The album debuted at number one on the UK Albums Chart, becoming the third fastest-selling album of the century and the fifth fastest-selling album of all time in the United Kingdom. Progress also became the biggest-selling album of 2010 by selling over one million copies in 24 days. As of June 2011, the album had sold 2.4 million copies in the UK. The album also became a commercial success in Continental Europe, where it charted within the top ten of twelve countries. The album has been certified two-times platinum by the International Federation of the Phonographic Industry for shipments of two million copies inside Europe. On 10 June 2011, the album was released alongside the EP Progressed, which features eight previously unreleased tracks.

== Background ==
In July 1995, Robbie Williams announced that he was leaving Take That. Following his departure, the group disbanded until 2005 when they made their reunion without Williams. In 2008, during the band's work on their fifth studio album, The Circus, Williams held a meeting with Gary Barlow and the other band members at his former house in Los Angeles after re-establishing contact in May 2006 during the Ultimate Tour. In 2010, in an interview on BBC Radio 1, Williams elaborated, "'It is one of those situations in life that could be very explosive and could go completely wrong. We had that big chat and the most amazing thing happened at the end of it. We both said sorry to each other and we both meant it and that was all we needed." Barlow added "I spent the last 15 years thinking about what I was going to say."

== Recording ==
Recording began in Electric Lady Studios in September 2009, following their sell-out The Circus Live tour. Some songs, such as "Eight Letters", came from lyrics and melodies written before the sessions, however Barlow produced backing tracks before the sessions for the band to work with, which spawned songs such as "SOS", "Pretty Things" and "Happy Now". Following this, rumours began to circulate that the group were working together. The five appeared on stage together for the first time since 1995 at Children in Need Rocks the Royal Albert Hall on 12 November 2009, however they at first did not perform anything, and instead Williams was invited on stage as the four-piece line-up of the band left. They sang together as part of the grand finale of the concert, singing the Beatles' "Hey Jude" alongside other acts from the show.

Despite this, Williams would leave the band soon after. His other bandmates attempted to get him to rejoin, and eventually they decided to continue recording as a five-piece at The Village in January 2010. At the studio, they recorded "Happy Now", "Kidz" and "Eight Letters". In February, they moved to Real World Studios, where they wrote and recorded "Pretty Things". However, after moving to London to continue recording in March, Mark Owen admitted to having multiple affairs and an alcohol problem. After a month in rehab, he returned to the sessions in April to record "What Do You Want from Me?", which he wrote as a message to his wife in response to his actions. In May, the group moved to recording in The Record Plant, Los Angeles. Orchestral overdubs were recorded at Abbey Road Studios in June.

Some songs that came out of the sessions for the album but were not put on it were released on the EP Progressed.

== Release ==
On 15 July 2010, it was announced that Williams would be returning to the band. A joint statement between Williams and the group said, "The rumours are true ... Robbie is back ... and to celebrate, we've written and recorded a new album, due for release later this year." On the same date, national newspapers printed the headline: "Following months of speculation, it has been confirmed that Robbie Williams is to make a return to Take That. Gary, Howard, Jason, Mark and Robbie have been recording a new studio album as a five-piece, which is due for release in November."

The album marks the band's 20th year in the music industry, as well as fifteen years since the release of the Nobody Else album, the last material the band recorded as a five-piece. The album cover was photographed by Nadav Kander, who had previously photographed Barack Obama. It mimics the iconic ape-to-man image, and has been positively received by critics.

The album was originally due for release on 22 November 2010; however, the release date was later brought forward a week to 15 November 2010. Barlow claimed that the decision was made after "massive pre-orders for the album" and after "analysing airplay and order data", with him revealing that "We've also never seen one of our singles played so much."

== Singles ==
- "The Flood" was released as the album's lead single on 7 November 2010.
- "Kidz" was released as the album's second single on 20 February 2011.
- "Happy Now" was released as the third single from the album on 18 March 2011.
- "Love Love" was released as the album's fourth single and the first single from the double disc edition, titled Progressed, on 11 May 2011.
- "When We Were Young" was released as the album's fifth single and the second single from Progressed on 11 July 2011.
- "SOS", despite not being released as a single, charted in the UK Singles Chart on 26 December 2010, relying on digital sales alone.

== Critical reception ==
Professional ratings
Aggregate scores
Source	Rating
Metacritic	80/100
Review scores
Source	Rating
AllMusic	4/5 stars
Entertainment.ie	4/5 stars
The Evening Standard	4/5 stars
The Guardian	4/5 stars
The Independent	4/5 stars
Q	4/5 stars
Virgin Media	7/10 stars

Progress received positive reviews from music critics. At Metacritic, which assigns a normalized rating out of 100 to reviews from mainstream critics, the album received an average score of 80, based on 8 reviews, which indicates "generally favourable reviews".

Q praised the album calling it "a triumph; musically, conceptually, personally." Virgin Media gave the album 7 out of 10, calling it "a deceptively dark offering from the usually quite cheerful man band". The Guardian gave Progress a rating of four out of five commenting that "Take That's first album as a quintet since 1995 is informed by two things: a genuinely new sound and Robbie Williams's seamless reimmersion into life as a band member, which is played out on emotional duets with Gary Barlow and Mark Owen" and concluding that "[Williams] and his bandmates have produced a noteworthy modern album." BBC Music gave the album a positive review stating: "If the title of Progress suggests the band's new sound will be a merging and evolving of Take That Mk.II and recent Robbie Williams fare, the reality is startlingly different. Progress is something entirely new – Take That Mk.III – and the strangest, most ambitious and most exciting record its creators have ever been involved in." Yahoo! Music UK awarded the album 8/10 and wrote, "It's all about Robbie Williams. His vocals dominant seven out of ten tracks, the keyboard heavy makeover has little to do with Take That and everything to do with his last three solo albums, and while the reunion has clearly done him the world of good, it doesn't seem like a fair and equal exchange."

Luke Turner of the NME gave the album seven stars out of ten stating the album is a "triumphant and quite crudely banging stadium synth-pop record" and praised Take That for "setting the pace [for other bands]." In his review for The Independent, Andy Gill wrote: "Rather than pop balladry, the album leans heavily on electronic beats and textures, and reflects misgivings about science and humanity", rating the album four out of five. AllMusic awarded the album four stars out of five stating "the emphasis is not on harmonies, it's on groove and texture, ballads taking a backseat to clever rips on Gorillaz or synthesized glam stomps" and concluded "Progress is the hippest and best music Take That has ever made." Neil McCormick of The Daily Telegraph gave the album three stars out of five and said that Robbie Williams "seems to have infused his band mates with his very peculiar sense of fun. ... But, be warned, it is not the Williams of Angels and Let Me Entertain You, it's the maverick maniac of the derided Rudebox" and stated "They should be applauded for daring to deliver a laugh out loud, big, brash, electro stadium epic". Entertainment.ie's Jenny Mulligan described Progress as "jammed with smart, stylish and irresistibly catchy tunes" concluding that "[the album] is a belter."

== Commercial performance ==
Prior to the release of the album it had become the most pre-ordered album of the year. On the first day of the release the album sold over 235,000 copies across the UK, making it the fastest-selling record of the century at that time (the record was later surpassed by Adele's 25, which sold over 300,000 copies on its first day of release). On 21 November 2010, Progress debuted at number one on the UK Albums Chart, becoming the band's sixth number-one album. By the end of its first week on sale the album sold around 520,000 copies, which made it the second fastest-selling album of all-time in UK chart history. In its second week, the album sold another 208,000 copies retaining the number one spot, and in its third week it sold over 174,000 copies remaining at number one. The following week Take That sold over 200,000 copies of Progress retaining the number one spot for a fourth week. On 8 December 2010, the album reached 1.009 million copies, taking 23 days to reach the figure only four more than the 19 days it took The Circus to reach one million in 2008. Progress became the first album in 2010 to break through one million sales in the UK. On its fifth week, the album sold over 330,000 copies to stay at the top of the UK Albums Chart and become Take That's third Christmas number one album, having sold more than 1.4 million copies in under five weeks. The album retained the number 1 spot for a sixth consecutive week selling over 433,000 copies, bringing total sales to 1.87 million copies and becoming the first UK number 1 album of 2011.

The album dropped to number two after a six-week run at number one. In April 2011, the album reached the 2 million sales marks, 139 days after its initial release. It is the fourth album by the band to sell upwards of 2 million of copies, following Beautiful World, The Circus and Never Forget – The Ultimate Collection. As of June 2011, Progress had sold 2.4 million copies in the UK. The album also debuted at number one in the Irish Albums Chart on 19 November 2010, making it the band's sixth number-one album in Ireland and at number one in Scotland. Across Europe the album achieved success with it going to number one in Greece, Germany, Denmark (going platinum by selling 30,000 copies in its first week.) It also debuted inside the top 10 of the charts in Austria, Italy, the Netherlands, Sweden, and Switzerland.

Progress became Take That's third and final album to top the European Albums Chart. It also has the notable distinction of being the last ever album to do so following the London Billboard office's closure.

== Track listing ==
All tracks are written by Gary Barlow, Howard Donald, Jason Orange, Mark Owen and Robbie Williams and produced by Stuart Price, with additional songwriting on "Eight Letters" by Midge Ure, Chris Cross, Warren Cann and Billy Currie.

No.	Title	Lead vocals	Length
1.	"The Flood"	Williams; Barlow	4:49
2.	"SOS"	Owen; Williams	3:44
3.	"Wait"	Williams; Barlow	4:14
4.	"Kidz"	Owen; Barlow	4:42
5.	"Pretty Things"	Williams; Barlow	4:03
6.	"Happy Now"	Barlow; Williams	4:02
7.	"Underground Machine"	Williams	4:15
8.	"What Do You Want from Me?"	Owen	4:37
9.	"Affirmation"	Donald	3:54
10.	"Eight Letters"	Barlow; Williams	4:40
11.	"Flowerbed" (hidden track)	Orange	3:48

== Personnel ==
Credits adapted from the liner notes.

=== Take That ===
- Gary Barlow – vocals, keyboards, programming (1–4, 6–11)
- Howard Donald – vocals, drums (1, 4)
- Jason Orange – vocals
- Mark Owen – vocals
- Robbie Williams – vocals

=== Musicians ===
- Stuart Price – keyboards (1, 2, 4–9), programming (1–4, 6–11), guitars (1, 7–10), bass (2, 7–9)
- Ryan Carline – programming (4)
- Ben Mark – guitars (1, 2, 8)
- Karl Brazil – drums (2, 8)
- Wil Malone – string arrangements and conductor (1, 3, 5)
- Everton Nelson – orchestra leader (1, 3, 5)
- Perry Montague-Mason – orchestra contractor and supervisor (1, 3, 5)
- London Studio Orchestra – strings (1, 3, 5)

=== Production ===
- Stuart Price – producer, mixing (1, 2, 4–11)
- Ryan Carline – engineer
- Noah Goldstein, Mike Houge, Andrew Kitchen and Ghian Wright – assistant engineers
- Richard Lancaster – string engineer (1, 3, 5)
- Dave Emery – mix assistant (1, 2, 4–11), additional engineer (9, 11)
- Spike Stent – mixing (3)
- Matty Green – mix assistant (3)
- Tim Young – mastering at Metropolis Mastering (London, UK)
- Studio Fury – art direction, design
- Nadav Kander – photography
- Jonathan Wild and 10 Management – management

i.e. Music Ltd. – management for Robbie Williams

== Charts ==
=== Weekly charts ===
Weekly chart performance for Progress
Chart (2010)	Peak position
Australian Albums (ARIA)	65
Austrian Albums (Ö3 Austria)	2
Belgian Albums (Ultratop Flanders)	36
Belgian Albums (Ultratop Wallonia)	32
Croatian Albums (IFPI)	13
Czech Albums (IFPI)	7
Danish Albums (Hitlisten)	1
Dutch Albums (Album Top 100)	4
European Albums Chart	1
Finnish Albums (Suomen virallinen lista)	46
French Albums (SNEP)	42
German Albums (Offizielle Top 100)	1
Greek Albums (IFPI Greece)	1
Irish Albums (IRMA)	1
Italian Albums (FIMI)	3
Italian Albums (Musica e Dischi)	3
Japanese Albums (Oricon)	145
Norwegian Albums (VG-lista)	25
Portuguese Albums (AFP)	14
Scottish Albums (OCC)	1
Slovenian Albums (IFPI)	14
South Korean Albums (Gaon Chart)	26
Spanish Albums (PROMUSICAE)	17
Swedish Albums (Sverigetopplistan)	7
Swiss Albums (Schweizer Hitparade)	2
Taiwanese Albums (G-Music)	6
UK Albums (OCC)	1

=== Year-end charts ===
Year-end chart performance for Progress
Chart (2010)	Position
Danish Albums (Hitlisten)	6
Dutch Albums (Album Top 100)	51
European Albums (Billboard)	6
German Albums (Offizielle Top 100)	15
Irish Albums (IRMA)	2
Italian Albums (FIMI)	50
Scottish Albums (OCC)	1
Swedish Albums (Sverigetopplistan)	62
Swiss Albums (Schweizer Hitparade)	73
UK Albums (OCC)	1
Worldwide (IFPI)	10
Chart (2011)	Position
Danish Albums (Hitlisten) (Progress)	50
Danish Albums (Hitlisten) (Progressed)	57
German Albums (Offizielle Top 100)	47
Italian Albums (FIMI)	63
Swiss Albums (Schweizer Hitparade)	70
UK Albums (OCC)	15

=== Decade-end charts ===
Decade-end performance for Progress
Chart (2010–2019)	Position
UK Albums (OCC)	9

== Certifications ==
Certifications for Progress
Region	Certification	Certified units/sales
Austria (IFPI Austria)	Platinum	20,000^{*}
Denmark (IFPI Danmark)	2× Platinum	60,000^{^}
Germany (BVMI)	Platinum	200,000^{^}
Ireland (IRMA)	6× Platinum	90,000^{^}
Italy (FIMI)	Platinum	60,000^{*}
Netherlands (NVPI)	Gold	25,000^{^}
Sweden (GLF)	Gold	20,000^{‡}
Switzerland (IFPI Switzerland)	Gold	15,000^{^}
United Kingdom (BPI)	8× Platinum	2,400,000^{^}
Summaries
Europe (IFPI)	2× Platinum	2,000,000^{*}
^{*} Sales figures based on certification alone.^{^} Shipments figures based on certification alone.^{‡} Sales+streaming figures based on certification alone.

== Release history ==
Release history and formats for Progress
Region	Date	Label	Format	Catalog
Ireland	15 November 2010	Polydor	CD, digital download (standard and deluxe edition)	275592-7
United Kingdom	15 November 2010	Polydor	CD, digital download (standard and deluxe edition)	275592-7
Germany	19 November 2010	Polydor	CD, digital download	274478-1
Australia	19 November 2010	Universal International	CD, digital download	274847-4
Japan	24 November 2010	Universal International	CD, digital download	UICP1121
Canada	30 November 2010	Polydor	CD, digital download	0252748474
Brazil	7 December 2010	Universal International	CD, digital download	2748474
United Kingdom	13 December 2010	Polydor	CD, DVD (box set edition)	275742-5
United Kingdom	13 June 2011	Polydor	CD – Progressed	277495-1
