= European Top 100 Albums =

European music chart, 1984–2010

The European Top 100 Albums chart was the European adaptation of the Billboard 200 albums chart. It ran from March 1984 until December 2010. Also commonly referred to as Eurochart Top 100 Albums, the chart showcased the sales of an act in 19 European countries based on IFPI data.

It was compiled by Music & Media. Billboard became Music & Media's financial partner in 1985 and later owned the magazine. When Music & Media closed in August 2003, Billboard continued to compile the European Top 100 Albums.

The European Top 100 combined album sales (both retail and digital) of new and older albums. The methodology was different from the US Billboard 200, where albums would only be allowed to chart if they weren't 18 months old. If an album older than 18 months had enough sales to enter the 200 chart after having already dropped out of the 100th position, it would chart on The U.S. Billboard Catalog Albums. Later Billboard reviewed the criteria and decided the older albums would also be allowed to chart in the 200, as it should show what's being sold.

The chart update and issue dating followed the rules of the Billboard 200: sales tracking week began on Monday and ended on Sunday. A new chart was published the following Thursday with an issue date of the following Saturday.

The first Eurochart number one album was Thriller by Michael Jackson. The final chart was published on 11 December 2010, following the news of Billboard closing their London office and letting their UK-based staff go. The album with the longest stay at number one was Madonna's True Blue, with 34 weeks. The last number one album on the chart was Progress by Take That.

== See also ==
- European Hot 100 Singles
