= Hold Up a Light =

Single by Take That

from the album The Circus
- Released: 14 December 2009
- Recorded: 2008
- Genre: Pop
- Length: 4:28
- Songwriters: Gary Barlow; Howard Donald; Jason Orange; Mark Owen; Jamie Norton; Ben Mark
- Producers: Take That; John Shanks

Take That singles chronology
"Said It All" (2009)	"Hold Up a Light" (2009)	"The Flood" (2010)

Audio video
- "Hold Up A Light" on YouTube

"Hold Up a Light" is the fifth and final single from English group Take That's fifth studio album, The Circus. It was released to promote Take That's first live album The Greatest Day – Take That Present: The Circus Live.

== Background ==
"Hold Up a Light" was written by band members Gary Barlow, Howard Donald, Jason Orange, Mark Owen, along with live band members Jamie Norton and Ben Mark. It was released to radio stations and as a digital download on 14 December 2009.

It features Owen on lead vocals, with Barlow taking a partial lead. The song was released as a single after its successful reception from fans whilst on tour. The physical version of the single was available to buy exclusively at stalls around the stadium during their Circus Tour, as well as for a short period of time through Take That's official website. The song charted at number 7 on the UK Airplay Charts and at number 123 on the UK Singles Chart.

The song also featured on Take That's Progress Live tour, where they performed it together before reuniting with Robbie Williams.

== Critical reception ==
The Guardian said the song was designed "to encourage a lighters-aloft moment." BBC Music described the track as "perky" and "magical". Digital Spy noted: " 'Hold Up a Light', led by Mark Owen, is a fist-pumping anthem that will require a lot of ticker tape when played live."

== Music video ==
The official music video for "Hold Up a Light" was premiered on The One Show. The video sees the four band members performing the song live on the Wembley leg of their record breaking Circus Tour.

== Personnel ==
- Mark Owen – lead vocals, backing vocals
- Gary Barlow – backing vocals
- Howard Donald – backing vocals
- Jason Orange – backing vocals

== Track listing ==
1. "Hold Up a Light" – 4:28
2. "Hold Up a Light" (live at Wembley Stadium) – 4:30

== Chart positions ==
Chart (2009)	Peak position
Scotland (OCC)	86
UK Singles (OCC)	123
UK Airplay (Music Week)	7
