= Up All Night (Take That song) =

Single by Take That

from the album The Circus
- B-side: "84"
- Released: 2 March 2009
- Recorded: 2008
- Genre: Pop rock; alternative rock
- Length: 3:21
- Label: Polydor
- Songwriters: Gary Barlow; Howard Donald; Jason Orange; Mark Owen; Ben Mark; Jamie Norton
- Producers: Take That; John Shanks

Take That singles chronology
"Greatest Day" (2008)	"Up All Night" (2009)	"The Garden" (2009)

Music video
- "Up All Night" on YouTube

"Up All Night" is the second single from English group Take That's fifth studio album, The Circus (2008).

== Song information ==
Released on 2 March 2009, it was the second single from the album The Circus. The single was only promoted in the UK and Ireland, and given a physical release in those countries.

The band performed "Up All Night" on Ant & Dec's Saturday Night Takeaway on 21 February 2009. It was the second live performance of the song, after they performed the song on ITV's Take That Come to Town. The band also performed the song on BBC's Comic Relief Does Top of the Pops special on 13 March 2009.

== Use in media ==
The track featured on the New Year's Day series 3 episode 6 of Gavin & Stacey, in which James Corden and Mathew Horne could be seen miming the song playing on the radio whilst driving.

== Critical reception ==
AllMusic described the song as a "cheerfully respectful stomp". BBC Music labelled the song a highlight, "utterly catchy" and with a "skip down the street chorus."

The Daily Mirror favourably likened the track to Simon & Garfunkel.

== Chart performance ==
The song debuted on the UK Singles Chart on 14 February 2009 (Valentine's Day) at number 72, four weeks ahead of the release date of the single based purely on downloads. The single peaked at number 14, becoming the band's second single out of their recent six to fail to chart in the UK Top 10. However, it did become their 20th consecutive UK Top 20 single. In Ireland the song debuted on Thursday 26 February 2009 at number 29 based on downloads, a week before the official release. The single peaked at number 14.

== Music video ==
The video for "Up All Night" was debuted on 27 January 2009, with Mark Owen on lead vocals. The video was directed by Daniel Wolfe, and features Take That performing at a street party in Croydon, with footage of them on the back of a lorry. Gary Barlow does not appear in the second half of the music video, filmed later in the dark, because his pregnant wife went into labour during filming.

== Personnel ==
- Mark Owen – lead vocals
- Gary Barlow – backing vocals, piano
- Howard Donald – backing vocals, drums
- Jason Orange – backing vocals, acoustic guitar

== Track listing ==
UK CD single

1. "Up All Night" (radio mix) – 3:21
2. "84" – 3:19

== Charts ==
=== Weekly charts ===
Chart (2009)	Peak position
Europe (Hot 100)	49
Ireland (IRMA)	14
Scottish Singles Sales (Official Charts)	2
UK Singles (Official Charts)	14
UK Airplay (Music Week)	1

=== Year-end charts ===
Chart (2009)	Position
UK Singles (OCC)	135
UK Airplay (Music Week)	17

== Certifications ==
Region	Certification	Certified units/sales
United Kingdom (BPI)	Silver	200,000^{‡}
^{‡} Sales+streaming figures based on certification alone.
