= Kidz (song) =

Single by Take That

from the album Progress
- B-side: "Rocket Ship"
- Released: 20 February 2011
- Recorded: Sarm West Studios (London, United Kingdom); Electric Lady Studios (New York City, United States); Abbey Road Studios (London, United Kingdom)
- Genre: Electropop
- Length: 4:44 (album version); 3:36 (UK radio edit)
- Label: Polydor
- Songwriters: Gary Barlow; Howard Donald; Jason Orange; Mark Owen; Robbie Williams
- Producer: Stuart Price

Take That singles chronology
"The Flood" (2010)	"Kidz" (2011)	"Happy Now" (2011)

Music video
- "Kidz" on YouTube

"Kidz" is a song by English pop group Take That from their sixth studio album, Progress. It was released as the second single from the album on 20 February 2011. The song features Mark Owen and Gary Barlow performing lead vocals.

== Background ==
The song was first announced as the album's second single when the group announced they were to perform the song live on The X Factor final on 12 December 2010; however they instead performed "The Flood" after Simon Cowell felt the song would reflect the recent riots and protests over the rising student tuition fees, due to the song lyrics and their backing dancers being dressed as riot police.

"Kidz" was officially announced as the second single from Progress on 12 January 2011. The single artwork was posted onto Take That's official website on 7 February 2011. The single was initially going to be released on 28 February 2011, but the date was moved forward to 21 February 2011. The single's B-side is "Rocket Ship", also sung by Gary Barlow and Mark Owen, who uses falsetto.

The digital download single was packaged with a remix entitled "Revenge of the Kidz", which was mixed by Howard Donald.

== Critical reception ==
"Kidz" has been referred to by Q Magazine as the highlight of Progress where the "reintroduction of Robbie Williams into the Take That ranks [has given] them a shot in the arm", concluding that "Kidz" is one of the "brilliantly mad future-disco titans". NME's Luke Turner was similarly enthused: "You can hear the influence of [David] Bowie on Progress' best track, 'Kidz', that curiously nasal tone seeping into Mark Owen's voice over the sort of dystopian electronica OMD or Depeche Mode ought to be making.

Entertainment.ie described the single as a "stand out track" on the album with "a massive production kicking off with pounding drums, resonating piano and grimy synths." Reality Shout music reviews also praised the song, stating that "armed with the song-writing capabilities of Gary Barlow, the producing prowess of Stuart Price, Mark Owen's wheezy vocals, and Robbie Williams' gutsy, candid lyricism and confident delivery, 'Kidz' is a riotous cacophony of attitude, synth, relentless hooks and a monolithic chorus. It starts with the sound of stomping boots closing in, and ends with the sound of police sirens and screams; every tiny detail is crafted perfectly, right down to each individual beat."

Nick Levine of Digital Spy also praised the song, awarding it 5 stars and calling it a "rabble-rousing glam-disco-pop stomper with ambiguously apocalyptic lyrics and – not inappropriately – one hell of a chorus", comparing Owen's vocal to Liam Gallagher and referring to the song as one of Take That's most thrilling releases.

== Music video ==
The official music video for "Kidz" was directed by Mat Whitecross and Eran Creevy, and filmed in Bulgaria in February 2011. The music video premiered through the official Take That iTunes App at 8 am on 27 February 2011.

The video begins with a kid watching the 1956 propaganda cartoon Destination Earth, later fading out with Take That appear as conquering heroes from different ages of war.

Images of warfare on television switches to Jason Orange viewing the events on Earth from inside a spaceship which is named 'Progress'. Mark Owen begins to sing which is beamed live across the world whilst armed forces mass waiting for their arrival as Gary Barlow begins the descent into Earth's atmosphere as the captain of the ship. The spaceship is revealed to be shaped as the TT logo as it lands, sending a container down to the ground which opens to reveal Take That inside it. The members then walk towards the military forces in front of them as a child breaks through the line and takes a photograph of them to which they pose. They then return to the spaceship and leave Earth as the world dances behind them.

There are two edits of the video, one of them begins with like seems to be some breaking news of Russian television before it switches to the beginning of the video, showing the band while a tag saying "1 hour 37 minutes earlier" appears. Then the video is the same, except from the end in which some voices can be heard. The other version starts with a kid watching television and then the band appears, without the tag and in the end there are no voices.

== Chart performance ==
The song debuted at number thirty-one on the UK Singles Chart a week before its official release, climbing a total of 168 places from #199 the previous week. The song then climbed to #28 the week after. It fell two spots on its fifth week to #30 The song spent 8 weeks in the UK Singles Chart.

The song entered the Danish singles chart at number 15 before peaking at #12 where it stayed for 4 weeks. The song entered the German charts one release of the album and peaked at #20 becoming their 17th single to enter the German top 40 where it stayed for 6 weeks.

Following the performance of the single on the Echo Awards the single also charted in the South Korean chart as well as peaking at #58 in Austria and #27 in Belgium. The song also peaked at #8 in Hungary where it remained in the top 40 for 12 weeks.

== Promotion ==
On 15 February 2011 Take That performed the song live at the opening of the 2011 BRIT Awards. The song was placed on the Radio 1 A List on 16 February 2011 where it remained for six weeks. The band performed the song live on the Dutch talk show Life4You on 20 March 2011, and in Germany at the ECHO Awards on 24 March. Take That also performed the song along with "The Flood" on the Danish edition of The X Factor on 25 March 2011.

== Personnel ==
- Gary Barlow – co-lead vocals, backing vocals
- Mark Owen – co-lead vocals, backing vocals
- Howard Donald – backing vocals
- Jason Orange – backing vocals
- Robbie Williams – backing vocals

== Track listing ==
- Digital download
1. "Kidz" – 4:36
2. "Rocket Ship" – 4:56
3. "Kidz (Revenge of the Kidz)" – 6:12
- UK CD single
1. "Kidz" – 4:44
2. "Rocket Ship" – 4:56
- iTunes exclusive
1. "Kidz" (live from The O2 Arena) – 4:25
- 2011 Brit Awards
1. "Kidz" (live from the BRITs) - 4:24

== Charts ==
=== Weekly charts ===
Chart (2011)	Peak position
Austria (Ö3 Austria Top 40)	58
Belgium (Ultratip Bubbling Under Flanders)	27
Denmark (Tracklisten)	12
Germany (GfK)	20
Hungary (Rádiós Top 40)	8
Ireland (IRMA)	45
Italy (FIMI)	24
Italy (Musica e dischi)	26
Latvia (Latvijas Top 40)	17
Romania (Romanian Top 100)	88
Scottish Singles Sales (Official Charts)	22
South Korea (South Korea Gaon Chart)	83
Switzerland Airplay (Swiss Hitparade)	19
UK Singles (Official Charts)	28
UK Airplay (Music Week)	4
UK Download (Official Charts Company)	31

=== Year-end charts ===
Chart (2011)	Position
Hungary (Rádiós Top 40)	64
UK Singles (Official Charts)	187

== Certifications ==
Region	Certification	Certified units/sales
United Kingdom (BPI)	Silver	200,000^{‡}
^{‡} Sales+streaming figures based on certification alone.

== Release history ==
Region	Date	Format
United Kingdom	20 February 2011	Digital download
United Kingdom	21 February 2011	CD single
Europe	8 March 2011	Digital download
