= Love Love (Take That song) =

Single by Take That

from the album Progressed
- Released: 11 May 2011
- Genre: Pop rock; electro-rock; rock
- Length: 3:42
- Label: Polydor
- Songwriters: Gary Barlow; Howard Donald; Jason Orange; Mark Owen; Robbie Williams
- Producer: Stuart Price

Take That singles chronology
"Happy Now" (2011)	"Love Love" (2011)	"When We Were Young" (2011)

Music video
- "Love Love" on YouTube

"Love Love" is a single by English pop group Take That from the band's first EP, Progressed. The song features Gary Barlow and Mark Owen on lead vocals. It was released in the United Kingdom as a digital download on 11 May 2011.

The song was featured in the end credits of the 2011 film X-Men: First Class. This was the second time the group has worked with director Matthew Vaughn, having previously written and recorded "Rule the World" for Vaughn's film Stardust.

== Critical reception ==
Robert Copsey of Digital Spy gave the single 4 out of 5 stars, praising it and stating, "'You bring me right back down to the Earth from the promised land' are the lyrics in the opening bars over mud-squelching synths, while the fat 'n' chunky chorus where they command their lovers to "give me what I need" is immediately satisfying. Like their recent offerings, it's a style that has transformed them from cheesy boyband to tough manband".

The Daily Star gave the single a positive review stating that "The boys haven't strayed away from the crunching electro template they employed on Progress, which means another mean, moody stadium shaker [which will] sound ace booming from footy grounds on their upcoming Progress Tour."

== Music video ==
The music video of the single was officially announced through the Take That official website on 27 May 2011 and debuted the same day at 4pm UTC.

Directed by Matthew Vaughn, the video shows the members of the band performing the song as a set of highly choreographed dancers parade around them. The video focuses on each of the members during different parts of the video as they sing from light emitting microphone stands as the picture flickers in and out of recognition. Clips from X-Men: First Class (2011) are featured throughout the video.

== Personnel ==
- Gary Barlow – co-lead vocals
- Mark Owen – co-lead vocals, backing vocals
- Howard Donald – backing vocals
- Jason Orange – backing vocals
- Robbie Williams – backing vocals

== Track listing ==
- Digital download
1. "Love Love" – 3:42
- UK promo single
1. "Love Love" – 3:42
2. "Love Love" (X-Men version) – 3:37

== Promotion ==
The group performed the song live for the first time at the National Movie Awards on 11 May 2011, which was held at Wembley Arena and broadcast live on ITV1. It was also performed as part of their Progress Live Tour in which the members of Take That performed the song whilst standing on a 60 ft mechanical man as it moves through the crowd and into the centre of the stadium.

== Charts ==
Chart (2011)	Peak position
Europe (Euro Digital Songs)	18
Hong Kong (IFPI Hong Kong)	3
Ireland (IRMA)	27
Italy (FIMI)	37
Italy (Musica e dischi)	33
Latvia (Latvijas Top 40)	35
Portugal (AFP)	50
Scottish Singles Sales (Official Charts)	15
Slovakia Airplay (ČNS IFPI)	78
South Korea (South Korea Gaon Chart)	82
Switzerland Airplay (Swiss Hitparade)	67
UK Singles (Official Charts)	15
UK Airplay (Music Week)	12

=== Year-end charts ===
Chart (2011)	Position
UK Singles (OCC)	173
