= The Garden (Take That song) =

Single by Take That

from the album The Circus
- B-side: "84"
- Released: 20 March 2009
- Recorded: 2008
- Genre: Pop rock
- Length: 5:07 (album version); 3:22 (Radio Edit)
- Songwriters: Gary Barlow; Howard Donald; Mark Owen; Jason Orange
- Producers: Take That; John Shanks

Take That singles chronology
"Up All Night" (2009)	"The Garden" (2009)	"Said It All" (2009)

Licensed audio
- "The Garden" on YouTube

Licensed audio
- "The Garden (Promo Radio Mix)" on YouTube

"The Garden" is a song by English group Take That. It was released on 20 March 2009 as the third single from their fifth studio album, The Circus. The Garden was released exclusively in Europe, as an alternative to the British-only single "Up All Night".

== Song information ==
Mark Owen originally intended to sing the song's bridge during its writing and recording but was surprised and impressed when Howard Donald sang it instead, which was kept in the final recording.

The song's B-side is "84", the same B-side of their preceding single "Up All Night", and is sung by Jason Orange.

== Promotion ==
The band performed "The Garden" on the Red Nose Day 2009 telethon, on 13 March 2009. The song has been performed on Mooi! Weer De Leeuw in the Netherlands on 14 March 2009. The song was then performed on Swiss television on the show Music Stars on 15 March 2009. The group then made an appearance on the Italian version of The X Factor on 17 March 2009. The band also performed the song on the German TV show Wetten, dass..? on 21 March 2009. The band then performed the track at the final of The X Factor (Denmark) on 27 March 2009.

== Critical reception ==
Digital Spy commented: "'The Garden' is a stunning, string-laden epic with a chorus so massive it requires a marching brass band for backing." The Sunday Times described the song as "propulsive and swollen with a giant chorus."

== Music video ==
The video for "The Garden" debuted on 21 March 2009, with all members singing lead vocals. The video for the song was shot at the Greenwich Maritime Museum, South London. The video is black and white and shows the band dressed in black performing the song. The video is interspersed with blurred images of people going about their daily lives. In the official Take That book Take Two the band express their dislike for the video, claiming that it worked with still images but as a music video, it did not work.

== Release ==
A physical version of the single was released in Europe. The single was available on two CDs, both containing the same track listing; however, a Limited Edition CD2, housed in a large jewel case, contained an exclusive foam car sticker of the TT logo, with 'The Garden' written underneath.

== Personnel ==
- Gary Barlow – co-lead vocals
- Howard Donald – co-lead vocals, backing vocals
- Jason Orange – co-lead vocals, backing vocals
- Mark Owen – co-lead vocals, backing vocals

== Track listings ==
1. "The Garden" (radio edit) – 3:22
2. "84" – 3:11

== Charts ==
Chart (2009)	Peak position
Austria (Ö3 Austria Top 40)	48
Denmark (Tracklisten)	8
Europe (Eurochart Hot 100)	45
Germany (GfK)	20
Netherlands (Single Top 100)	73
Switzerland (Schweizer Hitparade)	36
Switzerland Airplay (Swiss Hitparade)	53
UK Singles (Official Charts)	97
