= Greatest Day (Take That song) =

2008 single by Take That

Single by Take That

from the album The Circus
- B-side: "Sleepwalking" "Here"
- Released: 24 November 2008
- Recorded: 2008
- Genre: Pop rock
- Length: 4:01
- Label: Polydor
- Songwriters: Gary Barlow; Howard Donald; Jason Orange; Mark Owen
- Producer: John Shanks

Take That singles chronology
"Rule the World" (2007)	"Greatest Day" (2008)	"Up All Night" (2009)

Music video
- "Greatest Day" on YouTube

"Greatest Day" is a song by English pop group Take That. It was released through Polydor Records on 24 November 2008 as the lead single from their fifth studio album, The Circus (2008). The song was written by the band and produced by John Shanks.

The song reached number one on the UK Singles Chart, becoming the band's eleventh UK number-one single. It has since been certified double Platinum in the United Kingdom selling over 1.2 million copies.

The group performed the song as the opening to the Earthshot Prize awards held in Mumbai, India, on 17 November 2026 streamed to more than 240 countries and more than 40 languages.

== Background ==
"Greatest Day" was written by Take That and produced by John Shanks. The song was written and recorded at Sarm West Studios in Notting Hill and was mixed in Los Angeles at the Jim Henson Studios. Gary Barlow revealed on an episode of The Xtra Factor in 2011 that it took them 3–4 hours to write it. The song moves in 104 BPM and has a key signature of D flat major.

== Critical reception ==
Digital Spy stated the song was a "grower, sneaking up on you after about seven listens and battering you into submission with its hearty chorus and angelic harmonies". They concluded, however, that the song didn't match up to previous efforts, 'Patience', 'Shine' or 'Rule The World'. The BBC also made reference to previous releases they felt were stronger, noting the chorus failed to deliver.

Birmingham Live gave the song a positive review, regarding it an album standout, and noting similarities in the structure and style to Coldplay. The Sunday Mercury said: "Hit single Greatest Day is as pop-perfect now as Patience was back in 2006."

== Music video ==
The video for "Greatest Day" was filmed on location on top of the 28-story California Bank & Trust building at 550 South Hope Street in Downtown Los Angeles. It was directed by Meiert Avis, who previously shot videos for U2, Damien Rice, Bruce Springsteen and Bob Dylan. and produced by Jeremy Alter. The band shot the video while visiting producer John Shanks in the city who was mixing the album. It shows the band performing the song as they look on the sun setting in LA before they are beamed up into a light as the song finishes. The video premiered on AOL on 22 October 2008.

== Chart performance ==
"Greatest Day" debuted at number one on the UK Singles Chart upon its release, and became the band's 11th number-one single. It stayed at the top spot for one week before being succeeded by Leona Lewis. In Ireland, the single peaked at number two. The single also charted in the top 40 in Germany, The Netherlands, Denmark and Hungary.

== Promotion ==
Take That performed the song at the MTV Europe Music Awards 2008 on 6 November 2008, the first pan-European live performance by the band, preceding the single's release on 24 November 2008. The song was then premiered to a UK audience on The X Factor where they had a Take That themed song week, which the band opened on Saturday night.

The band also performed the song live at Children in Need 2008 on the BBC on 14 November 2008, before donating £250,000 to the charity. Take That performed "Greatest Day" at the 2009 Brit Awards. They performed the song live whilst upon a UFO stage prop but as the prop descended into the audience they were claimed to have lip synced. It was revealed after in Take That/Take Two that the technical people said they could not sing live as they were on the UFO stage prop. This was because of where they were positioned, which was right in front of the speakers, and if they had then the mics would have fed back.

== In popular culture ==
In March 2014, a re-recorded version of the song—featuring vocals from Barlow and other pop singers such as Eliza Doolittle, Katy B and Spice Girls members Melanie C and Emma Bunton, and former footballers such as Gary Lineker and Michael Owen – was announced as the official song for the England football team at the 2014 World Cup in Brazil. A music video of the song was shown during Sport Relief and uploaded onto YouTube, but the song was never released as a single.

The song was chosen via an online poll as the first song to be played on the rebranded Hits Radio (formerly Key 103).

== Personnel ==
- Gary Barlow – lead vocals
- Howard Donald – backing vocals
- Jason Orange – backing vocals
- Mark Owen – backing vocals

== Track listings ==
UK CD single

1. "Greatest Day" (radio mix) – 4:01
2. "Sleepwalking" – 3:43

German CD single

1. "Greatest Day" (radio mix) – 4:01
2. "Sleepwalking" – 3:43
3. "Here" – 4:28
4. "Greatest Day" (video) – 4:01

== Charts ==
=== Weekly charts ===
Chart (2008)	Peak position
Austria (Ö3 Austria Top 75)	43
Czech Republic (IFPI)	76
Denmark (Tracklisten)	28
Denmark Airplay (Tracklisten)	11
Europe (Eurochart Hot 100)	8
Europe (Euro Digital Song Sales)	1
Europe (European Hit Radio)	13
France Airplay (SNEP)	97
Germany (Media Control Charts)	27
Hungary (Single Top 40)	10
Ireland (IRMA)	2
Netherlands (Dutch Top 40 Tipparade)	9
Netherlands (Mega Single Top 100)	30
Scottish Singles Sales (Official Charts)	2
Spain Airplay (Top 40 Radio)	12
Sweden (Sverigetopplistan)	41
Switzerland Airplay (Swiss Hitparade)	17
UK Singles (Official Charts)	1
UK Airplay (Music Week)	1

=== Year-end charts ===
Chart (2008)	Position
UK Singles (OCC)	49
UK Airplay (Music Week)	37
Chart (2009)	Position
UK Singles (OCC)	100
UK Airplay (Music Week)	20

== Certifications ==
Region	Certification	Certified units/sales
United Kingdom (BPI)	2× Platinum	1,200,000^{‡}
^{‡} Sales+streaming figures based on certification alone.

== 2023 version ==
"Greatest Day (Robin Schulz Rework)"

Single by Take That featuring Calum Scott and Robin Schulz

from the album Greatest Days: The Official Take That Movie Soundtrack
- Released: 5 May 2023
- Genre: House
- Length: 2:44
- Label: EMI
- Songwriters: Gary Barlow; Howard Donald; Jason Orange; Mark Owen
- Producer: Robin Schulz

Take That singles chronology
"Out of Our Heads" (2018)	"Greatest Day (Robin Schulz Rework)" (2023)	"Windows" (2023)

Music videos
- "Greatest Day (Greatest Days version)" on YouTube
- "Greatest Day (Anora version)" on YouTube

"Greatest Day (Robin Schulz Rework)" is a reinterpretation of the original 2008 song by English pop group Take That featuring the band, Robin Schulz, and Calum Scott. It was released on 5 May 2023 as promotion for their jukebox musical film, Greatest Days.

The song was first premiered live two days after release at the Coronation Concert in celebration of the coronation of King Charles III and Queen Camilla held at Windsor Castle.

This version also featured in multiple scenes of the 2024 film Anora, which won the Palme d'Or at the 2024 Cannes Film Festival and the Academy Award for Best Picture at the 97th Academy Awards. Billboard reported that daily streams of the song had gone up 500% in the week following the ceremony. The group performed the song during the 78th British Academy Film Awards at the Royal Festival Hall.

The group performed the song during the finale of the F1 75 Live global telecast held at the O2 Arena in London on the 18th February 2025.

=== Critical reception ===
Michael Major from BroadwayWorld stated "Robin Schulz puts his high-energy stamp on the nostalgic classic, as Calum Scott brings depth with his impressive harmonies." Jack Hardwick from The Sun noted "the anthemic but stripped back single has been turned into a dancefloor banger by German DJ Robin Schulz."

David Rooney, in his review of Anora (2024) for The Hollywood Reporter, stated that "Baker makes a motif of the Take That banger, "Greatest Day," a euphoric anthem for the giddy high on which Ani's life is transformed."

=== Charts ===
Chart (2023)	Peak position
UK Singles Downloads (Official Charts)	7
UK Singles Sales (OCC)	7
