= The Flood (Take That song) =

2010 single by Take That

Single by Take That

from the album Progress
- Released: 15 October 2010
- Studio: Sarm West; Abbey Road (London); Electric Lady (New York City)
- Genre: Pop rock
- Length: 4:51 (album version); 4:14 (UK radio edit)
- Label: Polydor
- Songwriters: Gary Barlow; Howard Donald; Jason Orange; Mark Owen; Robbie Williams
- Producer: Stuart Price

Take That singles chronology
"Hold Up a Light" (2009)	"The Flood" (2010)	"Kidz" (2011)

Music video
- "The Flood" on YouTube

"The Flood" is a song by English pop group Take That from their sixth studio album, Progress (2010). It was released as the lead single in the United Kingdom on 7 November 2010. The song is the first to feature Robbie Williams since his return to the band in July 2010, and features both Williams and Gary Barlow on lead vocals.

The song received acclaim from critics, who praised its anthemic sound and Williams' vocals. It peaked at number 2 on the UK Singles Chart, and was a hit internationally.

== Promotion ==
The song was placed on the BBC Radio 1 A-Playlist for a number of weeks after its first play on radio in early October. The band appeared on The X Factor result show 6 to perform "The Flood" live for the first time on 14 November, it was also the first time they had performed as a five-piece in 15 years. They also performed it on Children in Need and closed the show with number-one single "Never Forget". They then sang "The Flood" on X Factor Italy on 23 November, as well as on The Voice of Holland on 27 November. Following that was a performance on Skavlan.

Then they performed it on Benissimo in Switzerland on 1 December. Next up was The Late Late Show in Ireland on 10 December and then they performed it live on Wetten, dass..? in Germany. They also performed "The Flood" on Strictly Come Dancing and Dance avec les stars. They later sang it on the X Factor final on 12 December, where they also sang their number 1 single "Never Forget" with the final three contestants. They closed the Royal Variety Performance with "The Flood", with their backing dancers representing the progress of man.

== Critical reception ==
The single gained rave reviews across the media and social network sites since its first play at BBC Radio 1 with social network users and fans commenting on the single as "incredible".

During the ITV broadcast of the documentary Look Back, Don't Stare, Elton John appears to listen to an early demo of the song with the band and comments "Brilliant, do you know how big this is gonna be?" - however, this was clever video editing and the extended cut reveals Elton was actually listening to the song Underground Machine.

Digital Spy awarded the single 4 stars commenting that the single "reveals itself to be a genuinely epic pop belter". The Daily Telegraph again praised the single stating "The Flood is a stirring us-against-the-world pop anthem that blends the best of Williams' rabble rousing instincts with Gary Barlow's smooth songwriting." Orange agreed with this view, stating that "when it comes to perfect pop, they're still the masters of their game".

The Flood was nominated for an Ivor Novello Award in 2012 for best work and most performed song.

== Chart performance ==
The single achieved commercial success in the United Kingdom and across Europe upon release, charting in more than 20 countries to date.

"The Flood" debuted in Denmark at number 7 on 22 October 2010 before moving up to 4. It remained in the Danish Singles Chart for a total of 20 weeks and was certified Gold by the IFPI. The track debuted in the Top 10 in Ireland on the Irish Singles Chart dated 11 November 2010, at number 8, but later rose to number 3 whilst also spending 15 weeks in the Irish Top 50. On 14 November 2010, the single debuted at number 2 on the UK Singles Chart with sales of 69,484 copies, and remained there the week after selling 89,917; it was held off number 1. The track has sold over 600,000 copies to date in the United Kingdom alone, being certified as Platinum, spending a total of eight weeks in the UK top ten, 20 in the top 100, and is currently their biggest selling single from the 2010s.

The song peaked at number 6 in Switzerland and remained in the charts for 21 weeks, also peaking at number 14 in Austria where it spent 19 weeks in the Austrian Singles Chart. The single became the band's 16th top 40 single in Germany where it peaked at number 12 and spent 25 weeks within the German Charts and in Norway the band continued their consecutive hits with The Flood peaking inside the top 5 at number 3. In the Netherlands the single peaked at number 4 and has to date spent 16 weeks within the charts, whilst the single peaked at number 2 in Italy where it was certified Gold by the FIMI.

== Music video ==
The music video, directed by Mat Whitecross, features the five members of the band racing against another crew in specially-made five-seater sculling boats. The band's boat is named "Progress" after the record breaking number 1 album, whilst the band wear old-fashioned white rowing kits, bearing a custom-designed Take That crest. The group is shown to be competing in a race against a younger crew and although losing the race, the group continue going past the finish line (to the confusion of the winning team) and are shown to row down the River Thames past famous London landmarks before fading away into a stormy sea. The video for the single was filmed in July 2010 on Dorney Lake in Buckinghamshire, which played host to the rowing events at the 2012 Summer Olympics, as well as on location on the River Thames.

== Personnel ==
- Robbie Williams - co-lead vocals, backing vocals
- Gary Barlow - co-lead vocals, backing vocals
- Howard Donald - backing vocals
- Jason Orange - backing vocals
- Mark Owen - backing vocals

== Track listing ==
- UK CD single
1. "The Flood" – 4:51
2. "The Flood" (instrumental) – 4:51
- UK DVD single
1. "The Flood" (Video) – 5:00
2. "The Flood" (Behind the Scenes) – 2:30
- UK promo single
1. "The Flood" (radio edit) – 3:54
2. "The Flood" (instrumental) – 4:51
- German CD single / UK iTunes package
1. "The Flood" – 4:51
2. "The Flood" (video) – 5:00

== Charts ==
=== Weekly charts ===
Weekly chart performance for "The Flood"
Chart (2010–2011)	Peak position
Austria (Ö3 Austria Top 40)	14
Belgium (Ultratip Bubbling Under Flanders)	3
Belgian Airplay (Ultratop Flanders)	19
Belgium (Ultratop 50 Wallonia)	24
Belgian Airplay (Ultratop Wallonia)	23
CIS Airplay (TopHit)	100
Czech Republic Airplay (ČNS IFPI)	27
Denmark (Tracklisten)	4
Denmark Airplay (Tracklisten)	2
Europe (Eurochart Hot 100)	4
Europe (Euro Digital Song Sales)	3
Europe (European Hit Radio)	7
Finland (Suomen virallinen lista)	28
Finland Airplay (Radiosoittolista)	6
France (SNEP)	37
France Airplay (SNEP)	29
Germany (GfK)	12
Hungary (Rádiós Top 40)	16
Ireland (IRMA)	3
Italy (FIMI)	2
Italy (Musica e dischi)	1
Latvia (Latvijas Top 40)	23
Netherlands (Dutch Top 40)	16
Netherlands (Single Top 100)	3
Norway (VG-lista)	3
Portugal (AFP)	31
Scottish Singles Sales (Official Charts)	2
Slovakia Airplay (ČNS IFPI)	44
South Korea (Gaon)	7
Spain (Promusicae)	44
Spain Airplay (Top 40 Radio)	13
Sweden (Sverigetopplistan)	24
Switzerland (Schweizer Hitparade)	6
Switzerland Airplay (Swiss Hitparade)	2
UK Singles (Official Charts)	2
UK Airplay (Music Week)	1

Chart (2020–2026)	Peak position
UK Singles Downloads (Official Charts)	72
UK Singles Sales (OCC)	73

=== Year-end charts ===
Annual chart rankings for "The Flood"
Chart (2010)	Position
Denmark (Tracklisten)	5
Europe (Eurochart Hot 100)	63
Germany (Media Control GfK)	81
Ireland (IRMA)	21
Italy (FIMI)	60
Italy (Musica e dischi)	31
Netherlands (Dutch Top 40)	163
Netherlands (Single Top 100)	98
Norway (VG-lista)	7
UK Singles (OCC)	35
UK Airplay (Music Week)	27

Chart (2011)	Position
Italy (Musica e dischi)	67
Netherlands (Dutch Top 40)	100
UK Singles (OCC)	150
UK Airplay (Music Week)	38

== Certifications ==
Certifications and sales for "Take That"
Region	Certification	Certified units/sales
Denmark (IFPI Danmark)	Gold	15,000^{^}
Germany (BVMI)	Gold	150,000^{‡}
Italy (FIMI)	Platinum	30,000^{‡}
United Kingdom (BPI)	Platinum	602,000
Streaming
Denmark (IFPI Danmark)	Gold	50,000^{†}
^{^} Shipments figures based on certification alone.^{‡} Sales+streaming figures based on certification alone.^{†} Streaming-only figures based on certification alone.

== Radio dates and release history ==
=== Radio add dates ===
Radio add dates for "The Flood"
Country	Date
United Kingdom	8 October 2010

=== Release history ===
Street dates for "The Flood"
Country	Date	Format	Label
Denmark	15 October 2010	Digital download	Polydor Records
Germany	5 November 2010	CD single, digital download	Polydor Records
United Kingdom	7 November 2010	Digital download	Polydor Records
United Kingdom	8 November 2010	CD single	Polydor Records
Worldwide	14 November 2010	Digital download	Polydor Records
