= Howard Donald =

English singer and DJ (born 1968)

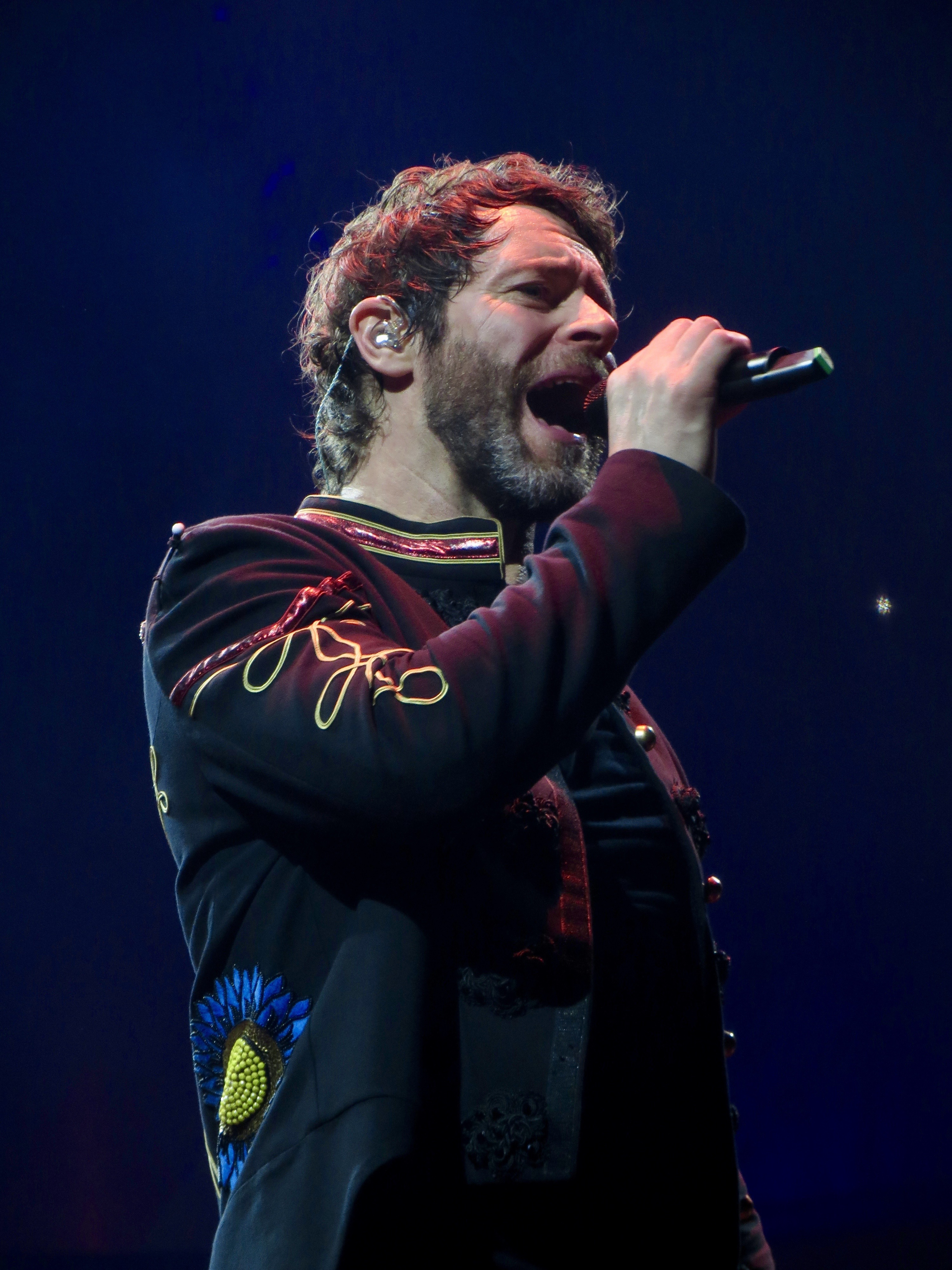
- Donald performing in Glasgow in 2017
- Born: Howard Paul Donald; 28 April 1968 (age 58); Droylsden, Lancashire, England
- Occupations: Singer; musician; songwriter; dancer; DJ; record producer
- Years active: 1988–1996; 2005–present
- Spouse: Katie Halil (m. 2015)
- Children: 4
- Musical career
- Genres: Pop; soul; dance-pop; pop rock; blue-eyed soul; country; house
- Instruments: Vocals; drums; percussion; keyboards; synthesiser
- Member of: Take That

Howard Paul Donald (born 28 April 1968) is an English singer, songwriter, drummer, pianist, dancer, DJ and record producer. He is a member of the pop group Take That. He was also judge on the German reality talent show Got to Dance from 2013 to 2014, during a Take That hiatus.

== Early life ==
Donald grew up in Droylsden with his older brothers Colin and Michael and his younger sister Samantha. He went to Moorside Primary School and Littlemoss High School in Droylsden, gaining no GCSEs, and trained for three years as a vehicle painter, on the Youth Training Scheme (YTS).

A budding DJ, his musical interests were largely informed by his brother Colin's vinyl collection, and included electronic acts such as Kraftwerk, John Foxx, Orchestral Manoeuvres in the Dark (OMD) and Gary Numan. As a teenager Donald became interested in dancing and frequented the burgeoning breakdancing circuit in the Greater Manchester area, where he would first come into contact with future bandmate Jason Orange. He auditioned for Nigel Martin-Smith's new boy band project at his office in Manchester and was selected. The group was eventually named Take That.

== Career ==
Nigel Martin-Smith recruited Donald, along with Gary Barlow, Jason Orange, Mark Owen and Robbie Williams to form a British boyband, Take That. The band enjoyed five years of success until Williams left in 1995, leaving them to carry on as a quartet. Along with Orange, Donald featured less on lead vocals than Barlow, Owen and Williams during the band's first era, however did sing lead vocal on the single "Never Forget", which reached No. 1 in the UK in 1995.

In early 1996, Donald's bandmates Barlow, Owen and Orange came to the difficult decision that Take That was to split. They told Donald, who was not happy, but went along with their decision. Following the split, Donald attempted a solo career, recording an unreleased single, "Speak Without Words", and returned to DJing. In the 2005 documentary Take That: For the Record, Donald confessed to being unstable enough to have the intention of committing suicide by drowning himself in the River Thames, not long after the split.

In 2005, Take That reformed and announced a reunion tour, The Ultimate Tour in the summer of 2006, following the release of their Greatest Hits album, Never Forget: The Ultimate Collection. The tour was followed in late 2006 by their first studio album since 1995, Beautiful World, and from it they achieved two number ones in "Patience" and "Shine". Beautiful World featured Donald on lead vocals on two tracks; "Beautiful World" and "Mancunian Way". The song "Mancunian Way" is a tribute to the band's hometown of Manchester.

On the 2008 Take That album The Circus, Donald sang lead vocals on two tracks, "What Is Love" and "Here". He also shared lead vocals with the rest of the band on the album's opening track, "The Garden".

On the 2010 Take That album Progress, Donald sang lead vocals on the track "Affirmation", with shared vocals on "Wait" and "Aliens", the latter of which is exclusive to the Progressed reissue the following year. He also played drums on several songs on the Progress album and mixed a B-side track for the second single "Kidz" called "Revenge of the Kidz".

On the 2014 Take That album III, Donald sang lead vocals on "Give You My Love".

On the 2017 Take That album Wonderland, Donald sang lead vocals on "Every Revolution".

On the 2023 Take That album This Life, Donald sang lead vocals on two tracks, "March Of The Hopeful" and "One More Word". He also sang lead vocals on "The Man I Am", included in the deluxe version the following year.

In 2021, Donald appeared on The Masked Dancer, masked as Zip. He reached the final and was unmasked in third place.

Donald was one of the judges on a dancing show Got to Dance in Germany from 2013 to 2014.

Donald continues to DJ professionally, including at 'Take That After Party' events.

== Personal life ==
Since January 2015, Donald has been married to illustrator Katie Halil. A spokesperson for him said, "I can confirm Howard Donald and Katie Halil were married at a private ceremony for close family and friends on 2 January."

He is the father of two daughters from two previous relationships. He also has two sons with his wife Katie Halil.

In April 2010, Donald was granted a super-injunction against former girlfriend, musician Adakini Ntuli, with whom he had been in an on/off relationship from 2000 to 2008. (See Ntuli v Donald.) After Ntuli engaged publicist Max Clifford and began negotiations with the News of the World, Donald obtained the super-injunction. The non-publicity side of the injunction was lifted in November 2010.

In 2007, he expressed his view that cannabis should be legalised, saying, "If more people went out stoned than drunk I think there would be less fighting, less trouble, and less violence." He admitted to having "dabbled with ecstasy" in the past.

In June 2012, it was revealed that along with Take That bandmates Gary Barlow and Mark Owen, Donald had invested £26 million in music industry investment schemes. The news attracted controversy when it was understood that the schemes could serve as tax shelters for high-net-worth people. Lawyers responded to the claims, stating the band members "paid significant tax, and that they believed the schemes were not for tax avoidance purposes but were legitimate commercial enterprises." In an interview with BBC Radio in 2020, Paul Stenning, who worked for the band in 1995 under their financial advisor Simon Orange, explained the way the band's finances were structured, saying they were "meticulously disseminated".

He is a supporter of Manchester United.

=== Health problems ===
During the Beautiful World Tour in 2007, Donald suffered a collapsed lung after performing a series of gymnastic stunts on stage, and was kept on a hospital ward for the two days, while the rest of the band performed as a threesome. However, Donald recovered quickly enough to reunite with the band on the final leg of the tour.

== Discography ==
=== Studio albums as a solo artist ===
- Speak Without Words (unreleased/recorded 1996)

=== Tracks as a solo artist ===
- Speak Without Words (1996)
- What You Do to Me (1996)
- Kidz (Revenge of the Kidz) (2011)

=== Studio albums with Take That ===
- Take That & Party (1992)
- Everything Changes (1993)
- Nobody Else (1995)
- Beautiful World (2006)
- The Circus (2008)
- Progress (2010)
- III (2014)
- Wonderland (2017)
- This Life (2023)
- Dreamers (2026)
