= This Life on Tour =

2024 concert tour by Take That

- Tour by Take That
- Location: Asia; Australia; Europe
- Associated album: This Life
- Start date: 13 April 2024
- End date: 18 November 2024
- Legs: 3
- No. of shows: 81
- Supporting acts: Olly Murs; Sophie Ellis-Bextor

Take That concert chronology
- Greatest Hits Live (2019); This Life on Tour (2024); The Circus Live – Summer 2026 (2026)

This Life on Tour was the twelfth concert tour by the English pop group Take That. The tour supported their ninth studio album, This Life (2023). The first leg of the tour began at the Utilita Arena Sheffield in Sheffield on 13 April 2024, and concluded at Co-op Live in Manchester on 12 June 2024. The second leg, titled 'This Life Under the Stars', began at Musgrave Park in Cork on 20 June 2024, and concluded at the Meo Marés Vivas Festival on 19 July 2024. The tour's third leg visited Australia, United Arab Emirates and Asia, concluding in Tokyo on 18 November.

== Opening acts ==
- Olly Murs (UK and Ireland dates)
- St Lundi (Cork, Dublin and Belfast)
- Sophie Ellis-Bextor, Ricki-Lee Coulter (Australia and New Zealand dates)
- Daniel Rooney (3 May 2024 at Glasgow)
- Alfie Castley (Germany, Denmark and Hungary)
- Matteo Bocelli (4 July 2024 at Klam)
- Andrzej Piaseczny (13 October 2024 at Łódź)

== Set list ==
This set list is representative of the first shows in Sheffield, performed on 13 and 14 April 2024.

1. "Keep Your Head Up"
2. "Windows"
3. "Giants"
4. "Days I Hate Myself"
5. "Everything Changes"
6. "Sure"
7. "Shine"
8. "A Million Love Songs"
9. "I Found Heaven"
10. "Pray" (with elements of "How Deep Is Your Love")
11. "Forever Love" (Gary Barlow solo)
12. "Clementine" (Mark Owen solo)
13. "Speak Without Words" (Howard Donald solo)
14. "Patience"
15. "The Flood"
16. "Get Ready for It"
17. "March of the Hopeful"
18. "The Champion"
19. "This Life"
20. "Greatest Day"
21. "These Days"
22. "Time and Time Again"
23. "Relight My Fire"
24. "One More Word"
25. "Hold Up a Light"
26. "Back for Good"
27. "You and Me"
  Encore
28. "Never Forget"
29. "Rule the World"

== Tour dates ==
List of 2024 concerts, showing date, city, country, and venue
Date	City	Country	Venue	Attendance	Revenue
13 April	Sheffield	England	Utilita Arena Sheffield	23,346 / 23,346	$2,822,796
14 April	Sheffield	England	Utilita Arena Sheffield	23,346 / 23,346	$2,822,796
17 April	Leeds	England	First Direct Arena	40,463 / 40,463	$4,885,460
18 April	Leeds	England	First Direct Arena	40,463 / 40,463	$4,885,460
19 April	Leeds	England	First Direct Arena	40,463 / 40,463	$4,885,460
20 April	Leeds	England	First Direct Arena	40,463 / 40,463	$4,885,460
22 April	Dublin	Ireland	3Arena	22,939 / 26,618	$2,567,270
23 April	Dublin	Ireland	3Arena	22,939 / 26,618	$2,567,270
25 April	London	England	The O_{2} Arena	89,367 / 89,367	$11,319,476
26 April	London	England	The O_{2} Arena	89,367 / 89,367	$11,319,476
27 April	London	England	The O_{2} Arena	89,367 / 89,367	$11,319,476
28 April	London	England	The O_{2} Arena	89,367 / 89,367	$11,319,476
30 April	London	England	The O_{2} Arena	89,367 / 89,367	$11,319,476
1 May	London	England	The O_{2} Arena	89,367 / 89,367	$11,319,476
3 May	Glasgow	Scotland	OVO Hydro	31,858 / 31,858	$4,346,128
4 May	Glasgow	Scotland	OVO Hydro	31,858 / 31,858	$4,346,128
5 May	Glasgow	Scotland	OVO Hydro	31,858 / 31,858	$4,346,128
7 May	Manchester	England	AO Arena	60,081 / 72,770	$7,444,807
9 May	Manchester	England	AO Arena	60,081 / 72,770	$7,444,807
10 May	Manchester	England	AO Arena	60,081 / 72,770	$7,444,807
11 May	Manchester	England	AO Arena	60,081 / 72,770	$7,444,807
12 May	Manchester	England	AO Arena	60,081 / 72,770	$7,444,807
14 May	Birmingham	England	Utilita Arena Birmingham	68,212 / 72,808	$7,961,502
15 May	Birmingham	England	Utilita Arena Birmingham	68,212 / 72,808	$7,961,502
17 May	Birmingham	England	Utilita Arena Birmingham	68,212 / 72,808	$7,961,502
18 May	Birmingham	England	Utilita Arena Birmingham	68,212 / 72,808	$7,961,502
19 May	Birmingham	England	Utilita Arena Birmingham	68,212 / 72,808	$7,961,502
20 May	Birmingham	England	Utilita Arena Birmingham	68,212 / 72,808	$7,961,502
24 May	Middlesbrough	England	Riverside Stadium	31,825 / 31,825	$3,523,310
25 May	Nottingham	England	City Ground	52,594 / 53,888	$5,960,982
26 May	Nottingham	England	City Ground	52,594 / 53,888	$5,960,982
28 May	Norwich	England	Carrow Road	24,927 / 24,992	$2,910,746
30 May	Milton Keynes	England	Stadium MK	30,397 / 30,476	$3,443,552
1 June	Southampton	England	St Mary's Stadium	60,806 / 61,320	$5,723,958
2 June	Southampton	England	St Mary's Stadium	60,806 / 61,320	$5,723,958
4 June	Plymouth	England	Home Park	25,188 / 25,369	$2,462,903
6 June	Swansea	Wales	Swansea.com Stadium	24,175 / 25,952	$2,268,640
8 June	Bristol	England	Ashton Gate	57,558 / 59,500	$5,616,733
9 June	Bristol	England	Ashton Gate	57,558 / 59,500	$5,616,733
11 June	Manchester	England	Co-op Live	22,553 / 26,772	$2,614,175
12 June	Manchester	England	Co-op Live	22,553 / 26,772	$2,614,175
20 June	Cork	Ireland	Musgrave Park	—	—
21 June	Dublin	Ireland	Malahide Castle	—	—
22 June	Belfast	Northern Ireland	Ormeau Park	—	—
25 June	Hannover	Germany	Gilde Parkbühne	—	—
27 June	Aalborg	Denmark	Skovdalen	—	—
28 June	Copenhagen	Denmark	Tivoli Gardens	—	—
29 June	Berlin	Germany	Zitadelle Spandau	—	—
30 June	Mönchengladbach	Germany	Sparkassen Park	—	—
2 July	Munich	Germany	Tollwood Festival	—	—
3 July	Budapest	Hungary	Budapest Park	—	—
4 July	Klam	Austria	Burg Clam	—	—
6 July	Murten	Switzerland	Stars of Sounds Festival	—	—
7 July	Marostica	Italy	Piazza Castello	—	—
8 July	Rome	Italy	Auditorium Cavea	—	—
10 July	Trani	Italy	Piazza Duomo	—	—
11 July	Bologna	Italy	Sequoie Music Park	—	—
13 July	Barcelona	Spain	Poble Espanyol	—	—
14 July	Marbella	Spain	Starlite Occident Festival	—	—
15 July	Marbella	Spain	Starlite Occident Festival	—	—
16 July	Seville	Spain	Plaza de España	—	—
17 July	Madrid	Spain	Real Jardín Botánico Alfonso XIII	—	—
19 July	Vila Nova de Gaia	Portugal	Meo Marés Vivas Festival	—	—
20 July	Murcia	Spain	Festival Murcia On	—	—
21 July	Jerez de la Frontera	Spain	Tio Pepe Festival	—	—
13 October	Łódź	Poland	Atlas Arena	—	—
15 October	Bratislava	Slovakia	Ondrej Nepela Arena	—	—
16 October	Prague	Czech Republic	O2 Universum	—	—
17 October	Basel	Switzerland	Baloise Session	—	—
19 October	Attard	Malta	Ta' Qali	—	—
20 October	Attard	Malta	Ta' Qali	—	—
25 October	Abu Dhabi	United Arab Emirates	Etihad Park	—	—
28 October	Singapore		The Star Performing Arts Centre	—	—
30 October	Perth	Australia	RAC Arena	—	—
2 November (Note: The concerts on 2 and 9 November 2024, were a part of A Day on the Green.)	Tanunda	Australia	Peter Lehmann Wines	—	—
6 November	Melbourne	Australia	Rod Laver Arena	—	—
7 November	Sydney	Australia	Qudos Bank Arena	—	—
9 November	Pokolbin	Australia	Esca Bimbadgen	—	—
13 November	Jakarta	Indonesia	Tennis Indoor Senayan	—	—
16 November	Kaohsiung	Taiwan	Kaohsiung Music Center	—	—
18 November	Tokyo	Japan	Garden Theater	—	—

== Cancelled shows ==
List of cancelled concerts, showing date, city, country, venue and reason
Date	City	Country	Venue	Reason	Ref.
10 November 2024	Mount Cotton	Australia	Sirromet Wines	Weather conditions	
