= This Life (Take That album) =

2023 studio album by Take That

Studio album by Take That
- Released: 24 November 2023
- Studios: Future Studios, London; Historic RCA Studio A, Nashville; Georgia May Studio, Savannah; East West Studios, Los Angeles; Electric Lady, New York; Beach Tree Sound, United States; Beatgarden Studios, Barcelona; The Prairie, London; Halle St. Peter's, Manchester
- Genre: Pop rock
- Length: 46:27
- Label: EMI
- Producers: Dave Cobb; Gary Barlow; Jennifer Decilveo; Ryan Carline

Take That chronology
Odyssey: Greatest Hits Live (2019)	This Life (2023)	Dreamers (2026)

Singles from This Life
- 1. "Windows" Released: 22 September 2023; 2. "Brand New Sun" Released: 17 October 2023; 3. "This Life" Released: 3 November 2023

This Life is the ninth studio album by the English pop band Take That, released on 24 November 2023 as their label debut on EMI. It marks their first studio album in six years since 2017's Wonderland.

The album debuted atop the UK Albums Chart and earned the biggest first-week sales for a British act in 2023. The album outsold the entire Top 25 combined that week.

== Background ==
This Life was announced on 22 September 2023, along with the release of its lead single "Windows" and an announcement of an ensuing tour. The announcement was made on The Radio 2 Breakfast Show with the debut of "Windows". Gary Barlow said of the album, "We made most of the album in Savannah in Georgia, so it had that [American] South sort of influence to it, and it's strange how an environment actually comes out in the music as well." Other portions of the album were recorded in Nashville and New York City.

An accompanying UK tour, called This Life on Tour, was announced on 22 September, with tickets going on sale on 29 September. English singer Olly Murs was the supporting act. The single "You and Me" was released on 28 March 2024 in promotion of the tour.

== Singles ==
- "Windows" was released with the announcement of the album on 22 September 2023.
- "Brand New Sun" was released as the second single from the album on 17 October 2023.
- "This Life" was the final single released before the album on 3 November 2023.
- "You and Me" was the first single released from the deluxe edition of This Life on 28 March 2024.
- "All Wrapped Up" was released alongside the announcement of the deluxe edition on 26 April 2024.
- "The Man I Am" was released as a promotional single from the deluxe edition on 29 May 2024.

== Commercial performance ==
The album debuted at number one on the UK Albums Chart and earned the biggest first-week sales for a British act in 2023, with 116,000 chart sales, 97% of which were on physical formats. This Life sold the highest number of physical CDs in 2023, having sold more than 100,000 units.

== Deluxe edition ==
On 26 April 2024, a deluxe edition of This Life was announced, containing five studio tracks and five live tracks. The edition was released on 24 May 2024. The first single from the edition, "You and Me", had been released prior on 28 March 2024. Alongside the announcement, the single "All Wrapped Up", also from the deluxe edition, was released. "Serenity", while originally a HMV exclusive, is also included on the deluxe edition.

== Track listing ==
All tracks are written by Gary Barlow, Mark Owen and Howard Donald; additional songwriters are noted below.

This Life track listing
No.	Title	Writer(s)	Producer(s)	Length
1.	"Keep Your Head Up" (lead vocals: Barlow)		Ryan Carline	3:14
2.	"Windows" (lead vocals: Barlow)		Dave Cobb; Carline^{[a]}	3:58
3.	"This Life" (lead vocals: Barlow)	Shawn Lee; Andy Platts	Barlow; Platts	3:48
4.	"Brand New Sun" (lead vocals: Owen)	Jamie Norton; Ben Mark	Jennifer Decilveo	4:28
5.	"March of the Hopeful" (lead vocals: Donald)	Norton; Mark	Cobb; Carline^{[a]}	3:49
6.	"Days I Hate Myself" (lead vocals: Barlow)		Cobb; Carline^{[a]}	4:01
7.	"The Champion" (lead vocals: Owen)	Norton; Mark	Decilveo	3:37
8.	"We Got All Day" (lead vocals: Barlow)		Carline	3:05
9.	"Mind Full of Madness" (lead vocals: Barlow)		Cobb; Carline^{[a]}	4:04
10.	"Time and Time Again" (lead vocals: Owen)	Norton; Mark	Decilveo	4:03
11.	"One More Word" (lead vocals: Donald)	Norton; Mark	Cobb; Carline^{[a]}	3:50
12.	"Where We Are" (lead vocals: Barlow)	Tim Woodcock	Cobb; Carline^{[a]}	4:30
Total length:				46:27

HMV bonus track
No.	Title	Writer(s)	Producer(s)	Length
13.	"Serenity" (lead vocals: Barlow)	Woodcock	Carline	3:50
Total length:				50:17

Deluxe edition second disc
No.	Title	Writer(s)	Producer(s)	Length
1.	"You and Me" (lead vocals: Barlow)		Stuart Price	3:31
2.	"All Wrapped Up" (lead vocals: Owen)	Norton; Mark	Carline	4:00
3.	"The Man I Am" (lead vocals: Donald)	Norton; Mark	Cobb	3:03
4.	"Serenity" (lead vocals: Barlow)	Woodcock	Carline	3:50
5.	"You and Me" (Acoustic)		Carline	3:34
6.	"This Life" (BBC Live Version)	Lee; Platts	Dan Roberts	3:40
7.	"Brand New Sun" (BBC Live Version)	Norton; Mark	Roberts	4:39
8.	"Windows" (BBC Live Version)		Roberts	4:09
9.	"Patience" (Live at KOKO)	Jason Orange; John Shanks	Carline	3:37
10.	"Shine" (Live at KOKO)	Orange; Steve Robson	Carline	3:48
Total length:				37:51

Notes

- ^{^a} signifies a vocal producer

== Personnel ==
Credits adapted from the liner notes.

=== Take That ===
- Gary Barlow – vocals (all tracks), keyboards (tracks 1, 3, 5, 6, 11, 12), synthesizer (1, 8, 12), programming (1, 8), piano (2, 6, 8, 11), MIDI strings (5), percussion (5), synth bass (11), drum and percussion programming (12)
- Mark Owen – vocals (all tracks), electric guitar (track 6)
- Howard Donald – vocals

=== Musicians ===
- Ryan Carline – keyboards (tracks 1, 3, 5, 12), synthesizer (1, 8, 12), programming (1, 8)
- Andy Platts – electric guitar, bass, drums, percussion, piano, synthesizer, backing vocals (track 3)
- Lee Pomeroy – bass (track 8)
- Donavan Hepburn – drums (track 8)
- Dave Cobb – electric guitar (tracks 2, 5, 6, 12), acoustic guitar (2, 11), bass (6)
- Aaron Hoey – slide guitar (track 2), acoustic guitar (9, 12), electric guitar (9)
- Brian Allen – bass (tracks 2, 5, 6, 9, 12)
- Nate Smith – drums (tracks 2, 5, 6, 9, 12), percussion (2, 5, 9, 12), synth bass (9)
- Philip Towns – keyboards (tracks 2, 5, 6, 9), piano (12)
- Jennifer Decilveo – piano, synthesizer, Mellotron, drum programming (tracks 4, 7, 10)
- David Levitt – guitar (tracks 4, 7, 10)
- Patrick Kelly – bass (tracks 4, 7, 10)
- Sam KS – drums (tracks 4, 7, 10)
- Dan Grech-Marguerat – programming (4, 7, 10)
- Ben Mark – electric guitar (track 5), acoustic guitar (11)
- Jamie Norton – keyboards (track 5), piano (7)
- Northern Film Orchestra (Note: The Northern Film Orchestra consists of string arranger Dan Keen; cellists Jacob Barns, James Heathcote, and Rachel Newbold; violists Nadia Eskandari, Paula Bowes, and Tom Rowan-Young; and violinists Dylan Edge, Elena Orsi, Jody Smith, Kath Ord, Mabon Jones, Matthew Chadbond, Rebecca Howell, and Shuwei Zuo.) – strings (tracks 1, 2, 5, 8, 11, 12)

=== Technical ===
- John Greenham – mastering
- Ryan Carline – mixing (tracks 1, 8), engineering (1, 8), vocal engineering (3), engineering assistance (4, 7, 10)
- Mark "Spike" Stent – mixing (tracks 2, 3)
- Dan Grech-Marguerat – mixing (tracks 4, 7, 10)
- Ben Baptie – mixing (tracks 5, 9, 12)
- Darrell Thorp – mixing (tracks 6, 11), engineering (tracks 2, 5, 6, 9, 11, 12)
- Dave Cobb – mixing (tracks 6, 11)
- Andy Platts – engineering (track 3)
- Cian Riordan – engineering (tracks 4, 7, 10)
- Nick Squillante – engineering (tracks 4, 7, 10)
- Tess Greenham – mastering assistance
- Sim Ogden – additional engineering (tracks 1, 2, 5, 8, 11, 12)
- Ethan Barrette – additional engineering (tracks 2, 5, 6, 9, 11, 12)
- Philip Smith – additional engineering (tracks 2, 5, 6, 9, 11, 12)
- Kieran Beardmore – mixing assistance (tracks 2, 3)
- Matt Wolach – mixing assistance (tracks 2, 3)

== Charts ==
=== Weekly charts ===
Weekly chart performance for This Life
Chart (2023)	Peak position
Austrian Albums (Ö3 Austria)	39
Belgian Albums (Ultratop Flanders)	30
Belgian Albums (Ultratop Wallonia)	140
Dutch Albums (Album Top 100)	84
German Albums (Offizielle Top 100)	8
Irish Albums (Official Charts)	1
Italian Albums (FIMI)	47
Scottish Albums (Official Charts)	1
Spanish Albums (Promusicae)	10
Swiss Albums (Schweizer Hitparade)	14
Taiwanese Albums (G-Music)	9
UK Albums (Official Charts)	1
UK Vinyl Albums Chart (OCC)	1

=== Year-end charts ===
Year-end chart performance for This Life
Chart (2023)	Position
UK Albums (OCC)	37

== Certifications ==
Certifications for This Life
Region	Certification	Certified units/sales
United Kingdom (BPI)	Gold	100,000^{‡}
^{‡} Sales+streaming figures based on certification alone.
