= Sweet July (song) =

Single by Take That

from the album Dreamers
- Released: 3 July 2026
- Genre: Pop
- Length: 2:23
- Label: EMI
- Songwriters: Gary Barlow; Mark Owen; Howard Donald; Matt Rad; Bill Maybury
- Producer: Matt Rad

Take That singles chronology
"You're a Superstar" (2026)	"Sweet July" (2026)	"Feel My Love" (2026)

Music video
- "Sweet July" on YouTube

"Sweet July" is a song by the English pop group Take That. It was released by EMI Records on 3 July 2026 as the second single from their tenth studio album, Dreamers (2026). It was written by Take That, Matt Rad and Bill Maybury and produced by Matt Rad. The song features Gary Barlow on lead vocals.

== Background ==
The song was first teased during The Circus Live – Summer 2026 tour at London Stadium on June 25th 2026. This was their first return to the venue since performing there at the London 2012 Olympic Games Closing Ceremony.

== Critical reception ==
Jon Stickler from Stereoboard described the track as an "uplifting, summery pop track". Universal Music Canada called it "a sultry summer song", adding that "Its beat driven verse and staccato vocals are topped with a classic, euphoric Take That chorus". Jo Forrest, writing for Totalntertainment, said: "The trio are firing on all cylinders with Sweet July."

== Music video ==
A performance music video was released on 3rd July 2026 showing the band performing the song onstage in an empty stadium.

The official music video premiered on 10 August 2026 and features Take That striding onto a film stage to perform, as an old-school rock combo: Gary on vocals, Mark on guitar, Howard on drums. The video changes into an animated performance in several different animation styles, each one a bit more 'rock 'n roll' than the last.

Later the performance becomes an animated rendition of the performance, in the style of a black and white comic book before further transformations into other comic book styles and textures.

The music video was directed by Vaughan Arnell who three decades earlier directed the band's music video for Back for Good. "The video was inspired by the iconic videos of INXS, Peter Gabriel and A-ha - but we wanted to re-interpret that style through a contemporary AI lens." Arnell explained.

"There were hand-drawn sketches, illustrations and painted elements, all blended with different AI platforms. It ended up feeling like a real fusion of traditional craft and modern mixed-media techniques, and we were thrilled with how it all came together."

Arnell worked with independent artist-led VFX studio Rohtau and three artists, based in different parts of Europe, developed each animation style under the auspices of Rohtau's Jordi Bares. French comic-book specialist Sébastien Daniel handled the water-ink, darker ink, and colour comic-book sections, maintaining both the timeline and the visual flow; Hungary-based Zed Zara brought his expertise in textured, gritty comic-book imagery and added depth; and Linus Konetschnigin from Switzerland drew on his background in comic books, collage, paper craft, and stop-motion to help shape the more tactile, layered sections.

== Track listing ==
- Digital single
1. "Sweet July" – 2:23

== Personnel ==
- Gary Barlow – lead vocals
- Mark Owen – backing vocals
- Howard Donald – backing vocals
- Dan Grech-Marguerat – mixing engineer
- Take That – performer
- Matt Rad – producer
- Sam Reid and Molly Anne – songwriters

== Charts ==
Chart (2026)	Peak position
Croatia International Airplay (Top lista)	81
UK Singles Downloads (Official Charts)	2
UK Singles Sales (OCC)	2
