= All Wrapped Up (song) =

Single by Take That

from the album This Life (deluxe edition)
- Released: 26 April 2024
- Recorded: 2023
- Genre: Acoustic/Pop
- Length: 4:00
- Label: EMI
- Songwriters: Gary Barlow; Mark Owen; Howard Donald; Jamie Norton; Ben Mark
- Producer: Ryan Carline

Take That singles chronology
"You and Me" (2024)	"All Wrapped Up" (2024)	"Said It All (Jax Jones Rework)" (2026)

Audio video
- "All Wrapped Up" on YouTube

"All Wrapped Up" is a song by the English pop group Take That. It was released by EMI Records on 28 March 2024 as the final official single and included on the deluxe edition of their ninth studio album, This Life (2023). It was written by Take That, Jamie Norton and Ben Mark, and produced by Ryan Carline. It features Mark Owen on the lead vocals.

== Background ==
"All Wrapped Up" was written by Take That and produced by Ryan Carline. The band released a statement saying the song was released to celebrate their upcoming This Life deluxe album release.

== Critical reception ==
TotalNtertainment journalist Jo Forrest stated "All Wrapped Up is a heartfelt track about coming back to a loved one, with Mark’s lead vocal entwined with beautiful acoustic guitar riffs and melodic harmonies."

== Track listings ==
- International digital single
1. "All Wrapped Up" – 4:00

== Personnel ==
- Mark Owen – lead vocals
- Gary Barlow – backing vocals
- Howard Donald – backing vocals
- Ryan Carline - programming, synthesiser
- Ben Mark - guitar
- Jamie Norton - piano, organ
- Lee Pomeroy - bass
- Donovan Hepburn - drums

== Charts ==
Chart performance for "All Wrapped Up"
Chart (2024)	Peak position
UK Singles Downloads (OCC)	32
UK Singles Sales (OCC)	36
