= Dreamers (Take That album) =

Studio album by Take That
- Released: 20 November 2026
- Genre: Pop
- Length: 42:31
- Label: EMI

Take That chronology
This Life (2023)	Dreamers (2026)

Singles from Dreamers
- 1. "You're a Superstar" Released: 20 March 2026; 2. "Sweet July" Released: 3 July 2026; 3. "Feel My Love" Released: 4 September 2026; 4. "Dreamers" Released: 1 October 2026; 5. "Higher" Released: 15 October 2026

Dreamers is the tenth studio album by the English pop band Take That, released on 20 November 2026 with EMI. The album follows the band's recent Netflix documentary and the revival of The Circus Live tour which was seen by over 700,000 people in 2026.

== Background ==
Work on Dreamers followed the band’s 2023 album, This Life. As with that record, the members initially developed songs individually before bringing them to the group. Mark Owen told Music Week that they had continued writing in a similar style to This Life before Howard Donald introduced “Higher”, a song built around an Earth, Wind & Fire sample.

The album was recorded in London, New York, Nashville and Los Angeles. Collaborators included Stuart Price, Jamie Scott, Martin Hannah, Red Triangle, Tom Odell and Johan Carlsson.

The band chose the album’s title while in a dressing room before a show during the summer revival of their Circus tour. Owen recalled that the members had previously been uncertain about a title, but agreed unanimously on Dreamers when it was suggested. Gary Barlow connected the title to the ambition of the band’s stage productions, which included an elephant that carried them through the audience. Donald described dreaming as a longstanding part of the group’s outlook, emphasising the work needed to turn their ideas into reality.

== Release ==
The album was originally announced as TT10 on 19 September 2025 and was made available for pre-order, providing access to the ticket pre-sale for The Circus Live – Summer 2026.

The lead single "You're a Superstar", was teased in a studio clip during the credits of the Netflix documentary Take That, which was released on 27 January 2026 and later as part of the setlist for The Circus Live – Summer 2026.

On 28 August 2026, the band revealed the album's title, Dreamers, and announced the Dreamers Tour, consisting of shows across Europe, opening in Zurich on 3 June 2027. The band also confirmed that "Feel My Love" would be released as the third single.

On 1 October 2026, the band revealed the album's artwork and release date and confirmed the title track as the fourth single.

On 8 October 2026, the band announced a one-night-only show at the London Palladium on 13 November 2026 to mark the album's release. Hosted by Dermot O'Leary, the show featured the first live performances of tracks from the album and guest appearances by Michael Patrick Kelly and Ben&Ben.

== Singles ==
- The lead single "You're a Superstar", was released on 20 March 2026 which was included in the setlist of The Circus Live – Summer 2026.
- "Sweet July" was released as the second single first played in the pre-show playlist of the bands shows at London Stadium in June and later released on 3 July 2026.
- "Feel My Love", with Michael Patrick Kelly, was released as the third single on 4 September 2026. The track was first played at Amfiteatr Kadzielnia in Kielce on 30 August 2026.
- "Dreamers" was released as the fourth single on 1 October 2026.
- "Higher" was released as the fifth single which was premiered by Vernon Kay on BBC Radio 2 on 15th October 2026. The group debuted the live performance of the song for their first ever performance in India at the Earthshot Prize awards held in Mumbai on 17 November 2026.

== Critical reception ==
Will Hodgkinson of The Times gave Dreamers three out of five stars, describing it as a "reassuringly conventional album". He praised the melody and harmonies of "Wonderkids", calling it a "rock-solid pop anthem", but found "You're a Superstar" lyrically hollow and "Best Heartbreak" formulaic. Alim Kheraj of The Guardian gave the album two out of five stars, finding it "so steeped in nostalgia that any moments of greatness struggle for attention". Kheraj also praised "Wonderkids" and singled out "Change of Season" for its experimentation, but criticised the disco arrangements on "Best Heartbreak" and "Higher" and regarded "My Love Is Yours" as the group's weakest song in years. Robin Murray of Clash gave the album seven out of ten, praising Gary Barlow's songwriting and the group's vocal harmonies. He described "Wonderkids" as "a mature overhaul of their sound" and praised the playfulness of "Higher", though he found "Sweet July" too middle-of-the-road.

Professional ratings
Review scores
Source	Rating
Clash	7/10
The Guardian	2/5 stars
The Irish Times	3/5 stars
The Times	3/5 stars

== Track listing ==
All tracks are written by Gary Barlow, Mark Owen and Howard Donald; additional songwriters are noted below.

Dreamers track listing
No.	Title	Writer(s)	Producer(s)	Length
1.	"Wonderkids" (lead vocals: Barlow)	Robert Shields	Shields; Stuart Price; Ryan Carline^{[v]}	5:14
2.	"You're a Superstar" (lead vocals: Barlow)	Jamie Scott	Scott; Martin Hannah; Price; Carline^{[v]}	3:17
3.	"Best Heartbreak" (lead vocals: Barlow)	Sean Douglas; Johan Carlsson	Douglas; Neiked; Peter Karlsson^{[v]}	3:25
4.	"Sweet July" (lead vocals: Barlow)	Bill Maybury; Noah Conrad; Mike Needle; Matt Rad; Jack Britten	Rad; Conrad^{[a]}; Carline^{[v]}	2:24
5.	"Higher" (lead vocals: Donald)	George Tizzard; Rick Parkhouse; Maurice White	Red Triangle; Carline^{[v]}	3:43
6.	"Who Do You Think You Are" (lead vocals: Barlow)	Carlsson	Carlsson; Karlsson^{[v]}	4:00
7.	"Dreamers" (lead vocals: Owen)	Jon Green; Jack Leonard; Benjamin Francis Leftwich; Blair Davie	Green; Leonard^{[a]}; Johnny 'Ghostwriter' Harris^{[a]}; Leftwich^{[v]}; Carline^{[v]}; Luke Glazewski^{[v]}	3:50
8.	"Feel My Love" (featuring Michael Patrick Kelly) (lead vocals: Barlow)	Scott; Needle; Kelly	Kelly; Scott; Hannah; Michael Ilbert	2:43
9.	"Change of Season" (lead vocals: Donald)	Ben Weaver; Jamie Norton	Cutfather; Jacob Buchardt; Carline^{[v]}	2:48
10.	"My Love Is Yours" (lead vocals: Owen)	Ben Weaver; Jamie Norton	Paul Staveley O'Duffy; Carline^{[v]}; TommyD^{[s]}	3:25
11.	"Saint" (lead vocals: Owen)	Jon Green; Ed Drewett	Green; Jarrad K; Carline^{[v]}	3:56
12.	"Masterpiece" (lead vocals: Barlow)	Tom Odell	Dan Keen; Carline^{[v]}	3:46
Total length:				42:31

Deluxe edition bonus tracks
No.	Title	Writer(s)	Length
13.	"Born Again"	Ross Golan; Carlsson
14.	"Glow" (featuring Ben&Ben) (lead vocals: Barlow)
15.	"I'm Still Here"	Golan; Carlsson
16.	"All About Us"	James Jayawardena; Eliot Kennedy

Notes

- ^{^[a]} signifies an additional producer.
- ^{^[s]} signifies a string producer
- ^{^[v]} signifies a vocal producer

== Personnel ==
Credits adapted from the liner notes.

=== Take That ===
- Gary Barlow – vocals (all tracks), synthesizer (2), programming (2)
- Mark Owen – vocals (all tracks)
- Howard Donald – vocals (all tracks)

=== Musicians ===
- Robert David Shields - keyboard (track 1), strings (1), drum programming (1)
- Seonaid Aitken - violin (track 1)
- Alice Allen - cello (track 1)
- Jamie Scott - backing vocals (track 2, 8), electric guitar (2), piano (2, 8), acoustic guitar (8)
- Jack Britten - backing vocals (track 2)
- Marti Perramon - backing vocals (track 2)
- Martin Hannah - electric guitar (track 2), bass (2), piano (8)
- Johan Carlsson - gang vocals (track 3), synth (3, 6), Hammond B3 (3), guitar (3, 6), piano (6), bass (6)
- Victor Rådström - bass (track 3), guitar (3), keyboard (3), drums (3)
- Magnus Johansson - trumpet (track 3), french horn (7)
- Janne Bjergner - trumpet (track 3)
- Wojtek Goral - flute (track 3), alto saxophone (3)
- Tomas Jonsson - tenor saxophone (track 3), baritone saxophone (3)
- Peter Noos Johansson - trombone (track 3)
- Matt Rad - drums, bass, electric guitar, acoustic guitar, piano, organ, shaker, tambourine, minimoog, backing vocals (track 4)
- Mike Needle - backing vocals (track 4, 8)
- George Tizzard - drums (track 5), piano (5), guitar (5)
- Rick Parkhouse - bass (track 5), synth (5), programming (5)
- Seb Philpott - brass (track 5)
- Mattias Axelsson - drums (track 6)
- Mattias Bylund - hammond organ (track 6)
- Jack Leonard - backing vocals (track 7), electric guitar (7)
- Benjamin Francis Leftwich - backing vocals (track 7)
- Jonny Harris - backing vocals (track 7)
- Blair Dave - backing vocals (track 7), acoustic guitar (7)
- Jon Green - backing vocals (track 7, 11), electric guitar (7), bass (7, 11), keyboard (7), synth (7, 11), strings (7, 11), piano (11), guitar (11)
- Sam Dixon - bass (track 8)
- Itamar Lapidot - acoustic guitar (track 8)
- Michael Patrick Kelly - acoustic guitar (track 8)
- Ruth O'Mahony-Brady - keyboard (track 8)
- Tanya Edwards - backing vocals (track 9)
- Mich Hansen - percussion (track 9)
- Ryan Carline – keyboards (track 9), guitar (9), synthesizer (9)
- Alexei Watkins - french horn (track 9, 12)
- Phillippa Slack - french horn (track 9, 12)
- Caroline O'Connell - french horn (track 9, 12)
- Tom Rees-Roberts - trumpet (track 9, 12)
- Mike Davis - trumpet (track 9, 12)
- George Hogg - trumpet (track 9, 12)
- Andy Wood - tenor trombone (track 9, 12)
- Jon Stokes - tenor trombone (track 9, 12)
- Paul O' Duffy - piano, keyboard, additional strings, additional brass (track 10)
- Greg Hoffman - bass (track 10)
- Scott Rimington - guitar (track 10)
- Ed Drewett - backing vocals (track 11)
- Dan Keen - bass, synth, percussion (track 12)
- Tom Odell - piano (track 12)

=== Technical ===
- Dan Grech-Marguerat - mixing & additional programming (all tracks except 3)
- David Miller - engineering (track 1)
- Ryan Carline - engineering (track 2, 7, 10, 11), strings arrangement (9), programming (8)
- Jamie Scott - programming (track 2, 8)
- Martin Hannah - programming (track 2, 8)
- Stuart Price - programming (track 2)
- Peter Karlsson - engineering (track 3)
- Mattias Bylund - horn arrangement (track 3)
- Andreas Andersson - horn arrangement (track 3)
- Kevin Grainger - additional programming, mixing (3)
- Matt Rad - engineering (track 4), programming (4)
- Rick Parkhouse - programming (track 5)
- Pär Hagström - engineering (track 6)
- Dan Keen - strings arrangement (track 6, 9, 11), brass arrangement (11)
- Mattias Bylund - synth programming (track 6)
- Johnny 'Ghostwriter' Harris - drum programming (track 7)
- Itamar Lapidot - programming (track 8)
- Michael Ilbert - engineering, mixing (track 8)
- Andy Dudman - orchestra engineering (track 8, 9, 10)
- Jacob Buchardt - programming (track 9)
- Paul O'Duffy - engineering, drum programming (track 10)
- Rosie Danvers - strings arrangement (track 10)
- Martin Williams - brass arrangement (track 10)
- Jarrad Kritzstien - engineering (track 11)
- Jon Green - programming (track 11)
- Maximilien Hein - piano engineering (track 12)
