= You and Me (Take That song) =

Single by Take That

from the album This Life (deluxe edition)
- Released: 28 March 2024
- Recorded: 2023
- Genre: Pop
- Length: 3:31
- Label: EMI
- Songwriters: Gary Barlow; Mark Owen; Howard Donald
- Producer: Stuart Price

Take That singles chronology
"This Life" (2023)	"You and Me" (2024)	"All Wrapped Up" (2024)

Music video
- "You and Me" on YouTube

"You and Me" is a song by the English pop group Take That. It was released by EMI Records on 28 March 2024 included on the deluxe edition of their ninth studio album, This Life (2023). It was written by Take That and produced by Stuart Price. It features Gary Barlow on the lead vocals.

== Background ==
"You and Me" was written by Take That and produced by Stuart Price. The band released a statement saying the song was released to celebrate their upcoming This Life on Tour shows across Europe, Asia, and Oceania. The song was played at the end of the main set of said tour, and was also featured on Now That's What I Call Music! 118 released on 26 July.

The song premiered on The Radio 2 Breakfast Show on 30 March 2024.

== Critical reception ==
Stereoboard.com journalist Laura Johnson labelled the track a "rousing pop ballad." Music and Gigs described the song as an "upbeat track, filled with harmonies that blend beautifully" whilst adding the song was "classic Take That, perfect for singing along in stadiums and arenas."

== Music video ==
The music video premiered on 13 June 2024 and was shot by Electric Light Studios and RHM Productions and produced by Electric Light Studios. The video is a montage of clips from the earlier shows of This Life on Tour during the UK and Ireland leg. The video shows different aspects of the show and the audience.

== Personnel ==
- Gary Barlow – lead vocals
- Mark Owen – backing vocals
- Howard Donald – backing vocals
- Stuart Price – keyboards, programming, guitar, bass, engineer
- Dan Grech-Marguerat – programming, engineer
- Ryan Carline – programming
- Dan Keen – string arrangement
- Jenny Sacha, Martyn Jackson, Marianne Haynes, Eleonora Consta – violin
- Bruce White, Anne Beilby – viola
- Chris Worsey, Ian Burdge – cello

== Charts ==
Chart performance for "You and Me"
Chart (2024)	Peak position
Finland Airplay (Radiosoittolista)	53
UK Singles Downloads (OCC)	4
UK Singles Sales (OCC)	6
