= Dreamers Tour =

2027 concert tour by Take That

- Tour by Take That
- Tour poster
- Location: Europe
- Associated album: Dreamers
- Start date: 3 June 2027
- End date: 23 July 2027
- Legs: 1
- No. of shows: 35

Take That concert chronology
- The Circus Live – Summer 2026 (2026); Dreamers Tour (2027)

The Dreamers Tour is the upcoming fourteenth concert tour by English pop group Take That, in support of their tenth studio album, Dreamers (2026). The tour is scheduled to begin on 3 June 2027 in Zurich, and conclude on 23 July 2027 in Tüßling.

== Tour dates ==
List of 2027 concerts, showing date, city, country, and venue
Date	City	Country	Venue	Attendance	Revenue
3 June	Zurich	Switzerland	National Museum Zurich	—	—
4 June (Note: The performance on 4 June 2027, is set to be a part of NDR 2 Festival.)	Hannover	Germany	Expo Plaza	—	—
5 June	Sankt Goarshausen	Germany	Freilichtbühne Loreley	—	—
6 June	Mönchengladbach	Germany	SparkassenPark	—	—
10 June	Waghäusel	Germany	Eremitage Waghäusel	—	—
11 June	Idstein	Germany	Hessentag Arena		
12 June	Berlin	Germany	Waldbühne	—	—
13 June	Warsaw	Poland	Progresja Summer Stage	—	—
15 June	Vilnius	Lithuania	Park Of The Hills	—	—
16 June	Tartu	Estonia	Tartu Song Festival Grounds	—	—
18 June	Oslo	Norway	St Hans Tjuvholmen	—	—
19 June	Bergen	Norway	Bergen Calling	—	—
21 June	Göteborg	Sweden	Liseberg	—	—
22 June	Stockholm	Sweden	Gröna Lund	—	—
25 June	Odense	Denmark	Tinderbox Festival	—	—
26 June	Bremen	Germany	Galopprennbahn	—	—
27 June	Amsterdam	Netherlands	AFAS Live	—	—
30 June	Belfast	Northern Ireland	Ormeau Park	—	—
2 July	Limerick	Ireland	Thomond Park	—	—
4 July	Brussels	Belgium	Cirque Royal	—	—
5 July	Brussels	Belgium	Cirque Royal	—	—
6 July	Paris	France	Zenith Paris - La Villette	—	—
7 July	Luxembourg	Luxembourg	Luxexpo Open-Air	—	—
9 July	Catalonia	Spain	TBA	—	—
10 July	Valencia	Spain	TBA	—	—
11 July	Fuengirola	Spain	Marenostrum Fuengirola	—	—
13 July	Madrid	Spain	TBA	—	—
14 July	Madrid	Spain	TBA	—	—
15 July	Galicia	Spain	TBA	—	—
17 July (Note: The performance on 17 July 2027, is set to be part of the Moon+Stars Festival.)	Locarno	Switzerland	Piazza Grande	—N/a	—N/a
18 July	Este	Italy	Castello Carrarese	—	—
19 July	Rome	Italy	Auditorium Cavea	—	—
20 July (Note: The performance on 20 July 2027, is set to be part of the Lucca Summer Festival.)	Lucca	Italy	Mura Storiche	—	—
22 July	Vienna	Austria	METAstadt	—	—
23 July	Tüßling	Germany	Schlosspark	—	—
