= Brand New Sun =

Single by Take That

from the album This Life
- Released: 17 October 2023
- Recorded: 2023
- Length: 4:28
- Songwriter(s): Gary Barlow; Mark Owen; Howard Donald; Jamie Norton; Ben Mark
- Producer(s): Jennifer Decilveo

Take That singles chronology
"Windows" (2023)	"Brand New Sun" (2023)	"This Life" (2023)

Audio video
- "Brand New Sun" on YouTube

"Brand New Sun" is a song by the English pop group Take That. It was released by EMI Records on 17 October 2023 as the second single from their ninth studio album, This Life (2023). It was written by Take That and produced by Jennifer Decilveo. It features Mark Owen on the lead vocals.

== Background ==
"Brand New Sun" was written by Take That and produced by Jennifer Decilveo.

== Live performances ==
Take That performed the single on Later... with Jools Holland, broadcast on 21 October 2023. This was the first time the band had played on the show.

== Critical reception ==
Retropop magazine labelled the track as "a tapestry of harmonies alongside a driving, warm instrumental." Stereoboard.com described the song as "coupling soft acoustic guitar with stirring vocal harmonies."

== Personnel ==
- Mark Owen – lead vocals
- Gary Barlow – backing vocals
- Howard Donald – backing vocals
