= The Circus Live – Summer 2026 =

2026 concert tour by Take That

- Tour by Take That
- Location: Ireland; United Kingdom
- Associated albums: The Circus; Dreamers (Note: Dreamers is being used by the band, in promotional material for the concert tour.)
- Start date: 29 May 2026
- End date: 4 July 2026
- Legs: 1
- No. of shows: 17
- Supporting acts: The Script; Belinda Carlisle; OneRepublic; Delta Goodrem
- Producer: SJM Concerts; Kennedy Street Enterprises; MCD Productions

Take That concert tour chronology
- This Life on Tour (2024); The Circus Live – Summer 2026 (2026); Dreamers Tour (2027)

The Circus Live – Summer 2026 was the thirteenth concert tour by the English group Take That. It was based on, and serves as a revival of, the group's seventh concert tour Take That Present: The Circus Live that took place in 2009. The tour also supported the band's tenth studio album, Dreamers (2026), and was released by EMI Records on 20 November 2026. Jason Orange, who took part in the original 2009 tour, was not present in the 2026 tour, as he departed in 2014.

The all-stadium concert tour commenced on 29 May 2026 at the St Mary's Stadium in Southampton, and concluded on 4 July 2026 at the Aviva Stadium in Dublin selling more than 736,000 tickets across the 17 shows. The tour was supported by Irish pop rock band The Script, and American singer Belinda Carlisle in the United Kingdom, American pop rock band OneRepublic, and Australian singer Delta Goodrem in Ireland.

== Background ==
A live stream in partnership with Amazon Music was streamed live from the Etihad Stadium in Manchester on 20 June exclusively to Amazon Prime and Twitch. The stream broke Amazon Music records becoming their most watched UK live streamed performance. On 17 July, the band released an exclusive EP available on Amazon Music featuring tracks from the stream.

== Set list ==
This set list is from the May 29 2026, concert in Southampton.

- The Adventures of a Lonely Balloon (intro)
1. "Greatest Day"
2. "Hello"
3. "Could It Be Magic"
4. "Pray"
5. "A Million Love Songs"
6. "Back for Good"
7. "The Garden"
8. "Shine"
9. "Up All Night"
10. "Babe"
11. "You're a Superstar"
12. "Love Ain't Here Anymore"
13. "Nobody Else"
14. "The Circus"
15. "What Is Love"
16. "Clown Medley" (consists of Do What U Like, Promises, It Only Takes a Minute and Take That & Party)
17. "Said It All"
18. "Never Forget"
19. "Patience"
20. "Relight My Fire" (with Zoe Birkett)

Encore

21. "Hold Up a Light"
22. "Rule the World"

== Tour dates ==
List of 2026 concerts, showing date, city, country, venue, opening act(s), attendance and revenue.
Date	City	Country	Venue	Opening acts	Attendance	Revenue
29 May	Southampton	England	St Mary's Stadium	The Script; Belinda Carlisle	—	—
30 May	Southampton	England	St Mary's Stadium	The Script; Belinda Carlisle	—	—
4 June	Coventry	England	Coventry Building Society Arena	The Script; Belinda Carlisle	—	—
5 June	Coventry	England	Coventry Building Society Arena	The Script; Belinda Carlisle	—	—
6 June	Coventry	England	Coventry Building Society Arena	The Script; Belinda Carlisle	—	—
9 June	Sunderland	England	Stadium of Light	The Script; Belinda Carlisle	—	—
12 June	Glasgow	Scotland	Hampden Park	The Script; Belinda Carlisle	—	—
13 June	Glasgow	Scotland	Hampden Park	The Script; Belinda Carlisle	—	—
16 June	Cardiff	Wales	Principality Stadium	The Script; Belinda Carlisle	—	—
19 June	Manchester	England	Etihad Stadium	The Script; Belinda Carlisle	—	—
20 June	Manchester	England	Etihad Stadium	The Script; Belinda Carlisle	—	—
21 June	Manchester	England	Etihad Stadium	The Script; Belinda Carlisle	—	—
25 June	London	England	London Stadium	The Script; Belinda Carlisle	—	—
26 June	London	England	London Stadium	The Script; Belinda Carlisle	—	—
27 June	London	England	London Stadium	The Script; Belinda Carlisle	—	—
1 July	Manchester	England	Etihad Stadium	The Script; Belinda Carlisle	—	—
4 July	Dublin	Ireland	Aviva Stadium	OneRepublic; Delta Goodrem	—	—
