= This Life (Take That song) =

Single by Take That

from the album This Life
- Released: 3 November 2023
- Length: 3:48
- Label: EMI
- Songwriters: Gary Barlow; Mark Owen; Howard Donald; Shawn Lee; Andy Platts
- Producer: Ryan Carline

Take That singles chronology
"Brand New Sun" (2023)	"This Life" (2023)	"You and Me" (2024)

Audio video
- "This Life" on YouTube

"This Life" is a song by the English pop group Take That. It was released by EMI Records on 3 November 2023 as the third single from their ninth studio album, This Life (2023). It was written by Take That, and produced by Ryan Carline. The song featured the lead vocals by Gary Barlow.

== Background ==
The song was recorded in RCA Studio A in Nashville, Tennessee.

== Live performances ==
Take That performed the single during their BBC Radio 2 In Concert performance, broadcast on 25 November 2023.

== Critical reception ==
The Independent stated: "There's a touch of Billy Joel and Joe Jackson to the descending piano chord stomp of 'This Life'."

The Standard labelled the track as "a retro, bouncy piano number that unfortunately sounds like the theme tune to a Seventies daytime soap opera".

== Personnel ==
- Gary Barlow - lead vocals
- Howard Donald - backing vocals
- Mark Owen - backing vocals

== Charts ==
Chart performance for "This Life"
Chart (2023)	Peak position
Switzerland Airplay (Swiss Hitparade)	66
UK Singles Downloads (OCC)	21
UK Singles Sales (OCC)	21
