= Windows (song) =

Single by Take That

from the album This Life
- Released: 22 September 2023
- Recorded: 2023
- Length: 3:58
- Label: EMI
- Songwriters: Gary Barlow; Mark Owen; Howard Donald
- Producer: Dave Cobb

Take That singles chronology
"Greatest Day (Robin Schulz Rework)" (2023)	"Windows" (2023)	"Brand New Sun" (2023)

Music videos
- "Windows" on YouTube
- "Windows" (Acoustic) on YouTube

"Windows" is a song by the English pop group Take That. It was released by EMI Records on 22 September 2023 as the lead single from their ninth studio album, This Life (2023). It was written by Take That, and produced by Grammy-winner Dave Cobb with Gary Barlow on lead vocals.

== Background ==
The song was recorded in RCA Studio A in Nashville, Tennessee.

== Critical reception ==
Smooth Radio labelled the song "gorgeous". The Independent noted "the track dials into the family-friendly Seventies soft rock of bands like America with its casual electric guitars and falsetto yearnings".

== Music video ==
The music video was directed by Ben Tricklebank and is based on the idea that the band are like three caged birds. They are longing to escape but individually are not certain if they can still fly. Only once they are together are they able to take flight again.

Tricklebank stated: "Universal sent out a really interesting brief that was centered around a technique of connecting moments through windows within each scene."

== Chart performance ==
"Windows" entered the UK Singles Downloads Chart at number three on 29 September 2023.

== Personnel ==
- Gary Barlow – lead vocals
- Howard Donald – backing vocals
- Mark Owen – backing vocals

== Charts ==
Chart performance for "Windows"
Chart (2023)	Peak position
Spain Airplay (Top 40 Radio)	20
UK Singles Downloads (OCC)	3
UK Singles Sales (OCC)	4
