= Take That =

English pop group

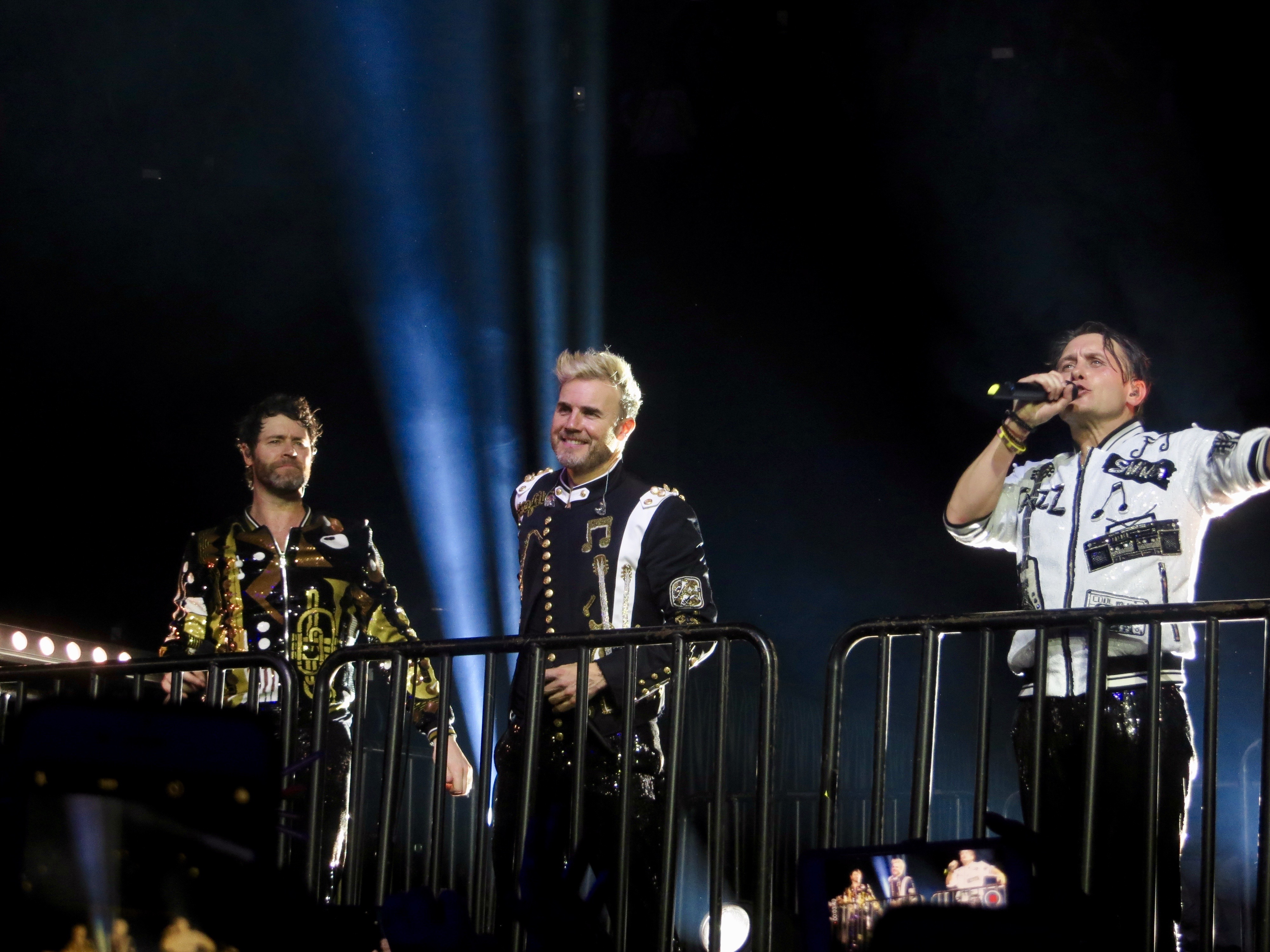
- Take That performing in 2017. From left to right: Howard Donald, Gary Barlow, Mark Owen

Background information
- Origin: Manchester, England
- Genres: Pop; pop rock; dance-pop
- Works: Albums and singles; songs
- Years active: 1990–1996; 2005–present
- Labels: BMG; Universal; Polydor; Interscope; Atlantic; RCA
- Members: Gary Barlow; Howard Donald; Mark Owen
- Past members: Robbie Williams; Jason Orange
- Website: takethat.com

Logo
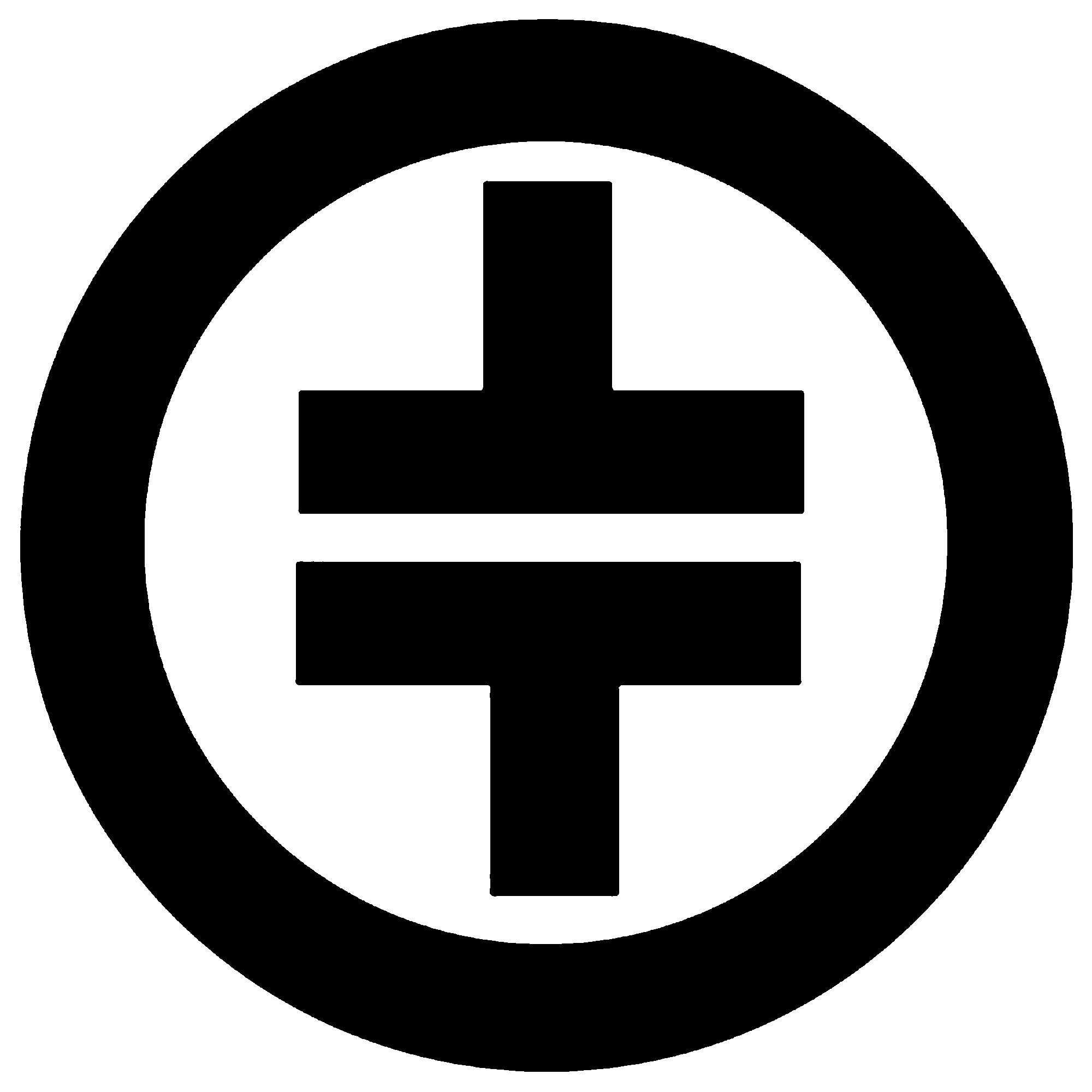

Take That are an English pop group formed in Manchester in 1990. The group currently consists of Gary Barlow, Howard Donald and Mark Owen. The original line-up also featured Jason Orange and Robbie Williams. Barlow is the group's lead singer and primary songwriter, with Owen and Williams initially providing backing vocals, and Donald and Orange serving primarily as dancers.

The group have had 28 top-40 singles, 20 top-10 and 17 top-5 singles on the UK Singles Chart, 12 of which have reached number one. They have also had nine number-one albums on the UK Albums Chart. Internationally, the band have had 56 number-one singles and 42 number-one albums. They have received eight Brit Awards, including Best British Group and Best British Live Act. In 2012 they received an Ivor Novello Award for Outstanding Contribution to British Music. According to the British Phonographic Industry (BPI), Take That has been certified for sales of 14.4 million albums and 14.6 million singles in the UK.

Williams left the band in 1995, while the four remaining members completed their world tour and released a final single before splitting up in 1996. After filming a 2005 documentary about the group and releasing a new greatest hits album, a four-piece Take That without Williams officially announced a 2006 reunion tour around the UK, entitled The Ultimate Tour. On 9 May 2006, it was announced that the group were set to record new material together once again. Their fourth studio album, Beautiful World, was released in 2006 and was followed up with The Circus, in 2008. The group achieved new success as a four-piece, scoring a string of chart hits across the UK and Europe while selling over 45 million records worldwide. Williams rejoined Take That in 2010 for the band's sixth studio album, Progress. Released on 15 November of that year, it was the first album of new material to feature Take That's original line-up since their 1995 album, Nobody Else. It became the fastest-selling album of the 21st century and the second-fastest-selling album in British history.

In 2014, the band recorded a seventh studio album, this time as a trio without Williams and Orange. The album, titled III, was released in November 2014 and became the band's seventh number one. It was preceded by the single "These Days", which became the band's 12th number one single in the UK. In 2011, Take That set the new record for the fastest-selling tour of all time in the UK with Progress Live, beating the previous record set by their Circus Live Tour in 2009. At the 2011 Brit Awards they won Best British Group. In 2012, Forbes named them the fifth-highest-earning music stars in the world. The group performed at the London 2012 Olympic Games closing ceremony, playing "Rule the World" while the Olympic Flame was extinguished. In the same year, the Official Charts Company revealed the biggest-selling singles artists in British music chart history with Take That placed 15th overall, making them the most successful boy band in UK chart history. Four of their albums are listed in the best-selling albums of the millennium, with three of them among the 60 best-selling albums in UK chart history.

== History ==
=== 1989–1990: Formation ===
In 1989, Manchester-based Nigel Martin-Smith sought to create a British male vocal singing group modelled on New Kids on the Block. Martin-Smith's vision, however, was to create a teen-oriented group that could appeal to multiple demographic segments within the music industry. Martin-Smith was then introduced to young singer-songwriter Gary Barlow, who had been performing in clubs since the age of 15. Impressed with Barlow's catalogue of self-written material, Martin-Smith decided to build his new-look boy band around Barlow's musical abilities. A campaign to audition young men with abilities in dancing and singing followed and took place in Manchester and other surrounding cities in 1990. At 22, Howard Donald was one of the oldest to audition, but was chosen after he got time off work as a vehicle painter to continue the process. A budding DJ, he and Barlow had a shared interest in electronic acts such as Orchestral Manoeuvres in the Dark (OMD) and Gary Numan. Prior to auditioning, Jason Orange had appeared as a breakdancer on the popular television programme The Hit Man and Her. Martin-Smith also selected 18-year-old bank employee Mark Owen and finally 16-year-old Robbie Williams to round out the group, which initially went by the name Kick It.

=== 1990–1992: Take That & Party ===
Take That's first TV appearance was on The Hit Man and Her in 1990, where they performed Barlow's self-written, unreleased song, "My Kind of Girl". They later appeared a second time to perform "Waiting Around", which became the B-side for the first single, "Do What U Like". "Promises" and "Once You've Tasted Love" were also released as singles but were minor hits in the UK. Take That initially worked the same territory as their American counterparts, singing new jack R&B, urban soul, and mainstream pop. However, they worked their way toward Hi-NRG dance music, while also pursuing an adult contemporary ballad direction. As they aimed to break into the mainstream music industry, they worked a number of small clubs, schools, and events across the country building up a fanbase as they travelled to gigs constantly for months.

Take That's breakthrough single was a cover of the 1975 Tavares hit "It Only Takes a Minute", which peaked at number seven on the UK Singles Chart in June 1992. This success was followed by "I Found Heaven", then by the first Barlow ballad "A Million Love Songs", which also reached number seven in October. Their cover of the Barry Manilow hit "Could It Be Magic" gave them their first big success, peaking at number three in the UK in the first chart of 1993. Their first album, Take That & Party, was released in 1992, and included all the hit singles to date.

=== 1993–1995: Everything Changes, Nobody Else and superstardom ===
1993 saw the release of Everything Changes, based on Barlow's original material. It peaked at number one in the UK and spawned six singles, with four being consecutive UK number one singles—their first number one "Pray", "Relight My Fire", "Babe" and the title track "Everything Changes". The lead single "Why Can't I Wake Up with You" had narrowly missed the top spot in the UK peaking at number two and the sixth and final single "Love Ain't Here Anymore" taken from the album reached number three on the UK charts. Everything Changes saw the band gain international success with the album being nominated for the 1994 Mercury Prize, but it failed to crack the U.S. market, where a U.S.-exclusive remix of "Love Ain't Here Anymore" gained little success.

By 1994, Take That had become radio and television stars across Europe and Asia, but it was not until 1995 that they did their first World Tour. It was during the years 1993–95 that the band fronted scores of magazine covers ranging from Smash Hits to GQ, becoming mass merchandised on all sorts of paraphernalia ranging from picture books, to posters, stickers, their own dolls, jewellery, caps, T-shirts, toothbrushes and even had their own annuals released. The band had also developed a large female teenage fanbase at the time. During this time, they performed at numerous music awards shows and chart shows such as the Brit Awards and Top of the Pops, also winning the Best Live Act award in 1995 at the MTV Europe Music Awards, having been renowned for their breakdance routines, high energy and creative tour productions.

In 1995, Take That released their third studio album Nobody Else, again based on Barlow's own material which reached number 1 in the UK and across Europe, capturing new audiences along the way, with Take That also able to make inroads in the adult audience in Britain through Barlow's melodic, sensitive ballads. For nearly five years, Take That's popularity was unsurpassed in Britain. The release of the first single from the album, "Sure", achieved another number one in the UK chart. It was not until their second release from that album, however, that they experienced what would become their biggest hit single, "Back for Good", which reached number one in many countries including the UK, Germany, Australia, and Norway. It was also their only hit in the US, where it reached number seven.

The song was initially unveiled for the first time via live performance while at the 1995 BRIT Awards, and based on the reception of that performance, the record pre-sold more records than expected and forced the record label to bring the release date forward by an unprecedented six weeks. The album was also noted for its cover, which was a parody of the famed cover of The Beatles' Sgt. Pepper's Lonely Hearts Club Band cover sleeve.

=== 1995–1996: Williams' departure, break-up and Greatest Hits ===
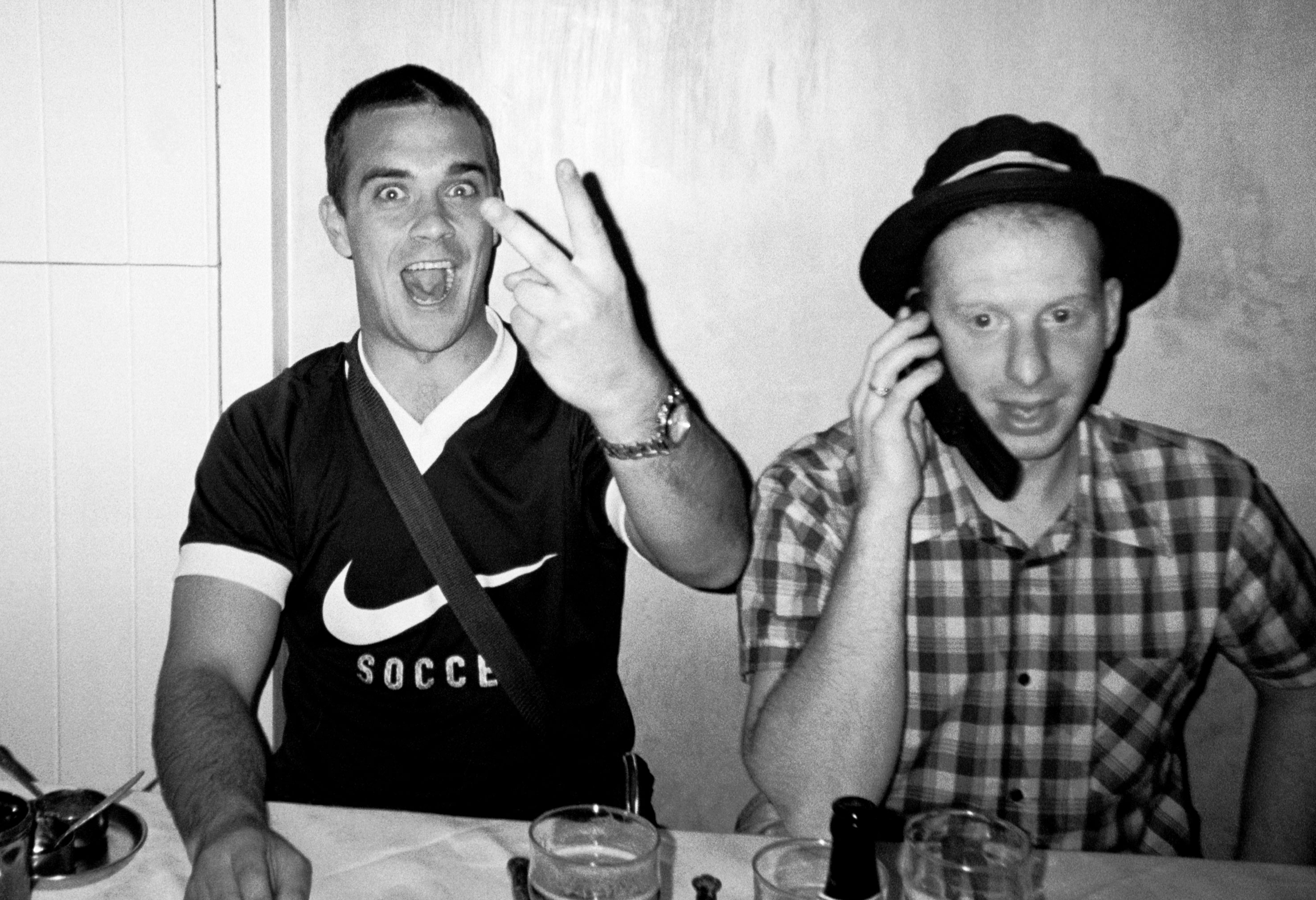
Robbie Williams left the band in 1995

Robbie Williams's drug abuse had escalated to a near drug overdose the night before the group was scheduled to perform at the MTV Europe Music Awards in 1994.

In June 1995, Williams was photographed by the press partying with Oasis at the Glastonbury Festival. The following month, the band offered him an ultimatum; he was to adhere to the band's responsibilities or leave before their scheduled world tour. Williams chose the latter. Williams claimed he was bored with Barlow's leadership and jealous of Barlow. Despite the loss of Williams, Take That continued to promote Nobody Else as a four-piece, scoring a further hit single with "Never Forget" with Donald on lead vocals. They subsequently went to America and completed the Nobody Else Tour in October 1995. Following the tour, the band began to plan for their next album; however, when they spent Christmas together, they mutually agreed it was time to part ways.

On 13 February 1996, Take That formally announced that they were disbanding. This was followed by the Greatest Hits compilation in 1996, which contained a new recording, a cover of the Bee Gees' "How Deep Is Your Love". The single went on to become what was to be the band's final UK number one until their 2006 comeback a decade later. Take That gave what was thought to be their final performance in April 1996 in Almere-Haven. Following the band's announcement, millions of their fans were distraught around the world and in the UK alone, teenage girls threatened suicide and were seen lining streets in tears, to the point that telephone hotlines were set up by the Samaritans charity to deal with counselling them. After the band broke up, highly respected music figures such as Elton John noted that Take That were different from other boy bands before and after them, in that they wrote their own material through Gary Barlow. Barlow is one of only two people to have won an Ivor Novello award during their time in a boy band, with Tony Mortimer whilst in East 17 being the other to have achieved this feat. Take That had also left a legacy of being immaculate performers with a very high work ethic, causing them to be voted in as the greatest boy band of all time.

=== 2005–2006: Reunion as a quartet and Never Forget – The Ultimate Collection ===
On 14 November 2005, Never Forget – The Ultimate Collection, a new compilation of their hit singles including a new previously unreleased song, also achieved great success and peaked at number 2 on UK charts, selling over 2.4 million copies in the UK alone. The new song "Today I've Lost You" (recorded in September 2005) was originally written by Barlow as the follow-up to "Back for Good" but was never recorded. On 16 November 2005, the group got back together for the ITV1 documentary Take That: For the Record, in which they aired their views over their fame, success, the split and what the post-Williams line-up had done since.

On 25 November 2005, there was an official press conference by the band announcing that the post-Robbie Williams line-up was going to tour in 2006. The tour, entitled The Ultimate Tour, ran from April to June 2006. The tour featured a guest appearance by British soul singer Beverley Knight, who replaced Lulu's vocals on the song "Relight My Fire"; although Lulu did appear during the stadium shows on "Relight My Fire" and "Never Forget". The Pussycat Dolls supported the group at their Dublin concert, and the Sugababes supported the group on the final five dates of the stadium leg. In a seven-year study analysing over one billion online searches via Google conducted by AccuraCast, a leading digital search agency, their comeback was ranked at number one in the UK.

=== 2006–2007: Beautiful World ===
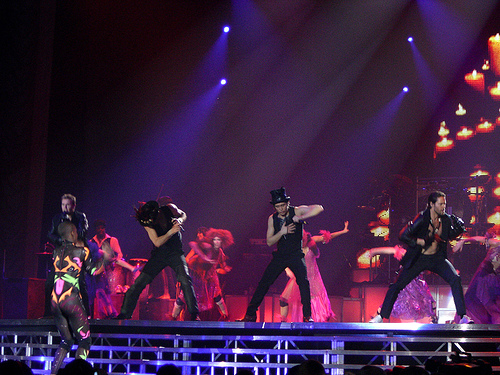
Take That performing at the Newcastle Metro Radio Arena in 2007

On 9 May 2006, Take That returned to the recorded music scene after more than ten years of absence, signing with Polydor Records. The band's comeback album, Beautiful World, entered the UK Albums Chart at no. 1 and, as of June 2009, had sold over 2.8 million copies in the UK. It is the 35th-best-selling album in UK music history.

On Beautiful World, all four members of the band had the opportunity to sing lead vocals and contribute in the songwriting. Unlike the band's earlier works, where the majority of their material was written by Barlow who received sole credit, all four band members are credited as co-writers, along with John Shanks. The comeback single, "Patience", was released on 20 November 2006, with a special event launching it on 5 November. On 26 November "Patience" hit number 1 in the UK in its second week of chart entry, making it the group's ninth No. 1, and staying there for 4 weeks. Take That also accompanied eventual winner Leona Lewis on a live version of "A Million Love Songs" during the final of The X Factor on 16 December 2006.

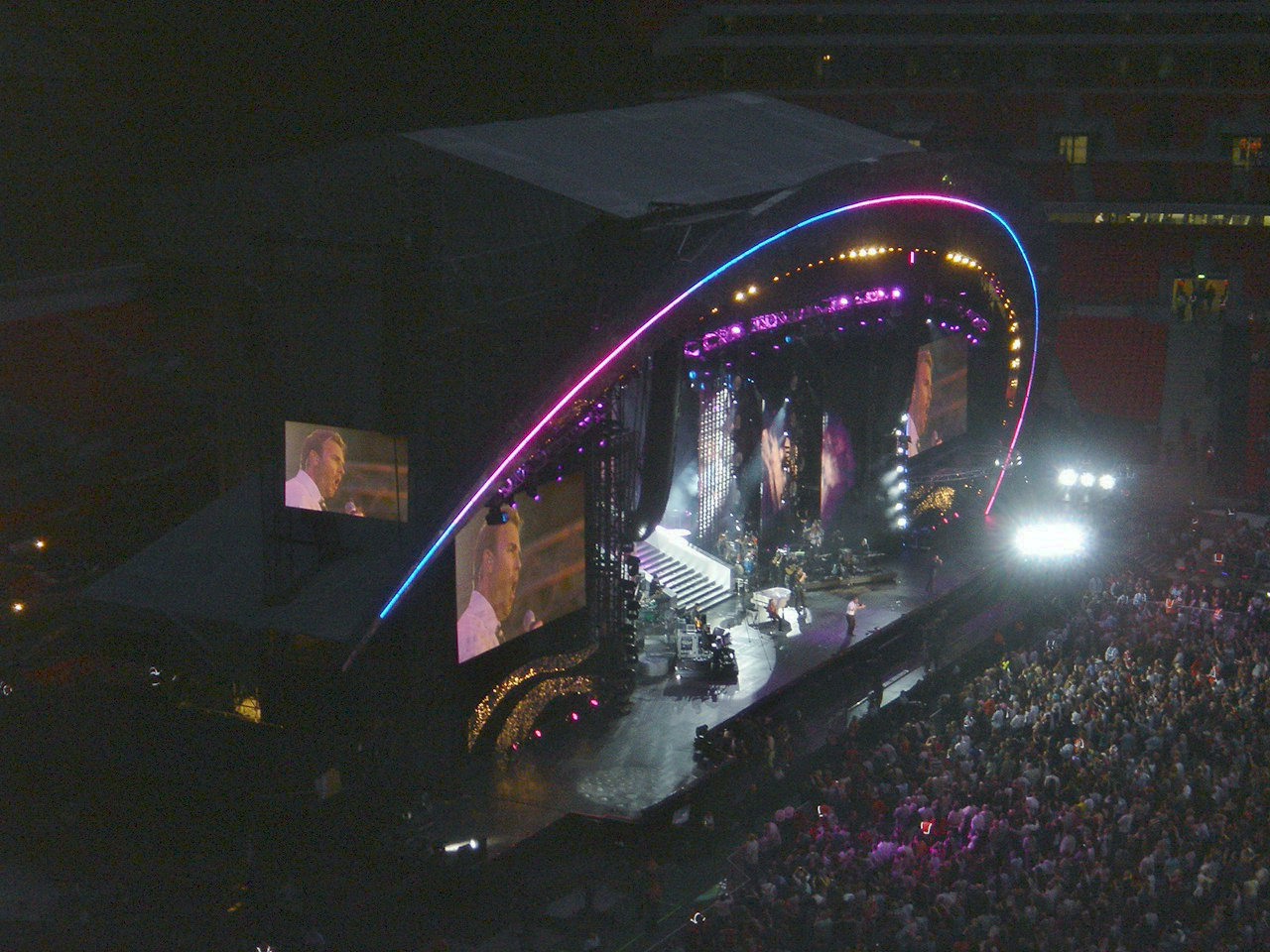
Take That at the Concert for Diana, commemorating Princess Diana, at Wembley Stadium on 1 July 2007

The week after Beautiful World was released, it was announced that Take That had become the first artists ever to top the UK official single and album charts along with the download single, download album and DVD charts in the same week, as well as topping the radio charts.

The video for the number 1 hit single "Shine", the follow-up to "Patience", premiered on 25 January 2007 on Channel 4, ahead of its release on 26 February 2007. The band's success continued on 14 February 2007 when Take That performed live at the Brit Awards ceremony at Earl's Court. Their single "Patience" won the Best British Single category. The third single chosen from Beautiful World was "I'd Wait For Life", released on 18 June 2007 in the UK. The single reached 17 in the UK Singles Chart. This may have been due to lack of promotion, as the band decided to take a pre-tour break rather than do any promotion for the single. The single "Rule the World", included on the deluxe version of Beautiful World, was recorded for the soundtrack of the film Stardust (2007). It reached number two in the UK and went on to become the group's second-best-selling single, shifting over 1.2 million units in the UK. Beautiful World was the fourth-biggest-selling album of 2007. It was announced at the start of 2007 that Take That signed a record deal with American label Interscope, and would also release their album in Canada. Starting on 11 October 2007, Take That began their Beautiful World Tour 2007 in Belfast. The tour included 49 shows throughout Europe and the UK and ended in Manchester on 23 December 2007. The band received four nominations at the 2008 BRIT Awards. Nominated for Best British Group, Best British Single ("Shine"), Best British Album (Beautiful World) and Best Live Act, they took home the Best Live Act and the Best British Single awards. According to a 2007 MSN UK internet poll, Take That were voted as the "comeback kings" of the year.

=== 2008–2009: The Circus ===
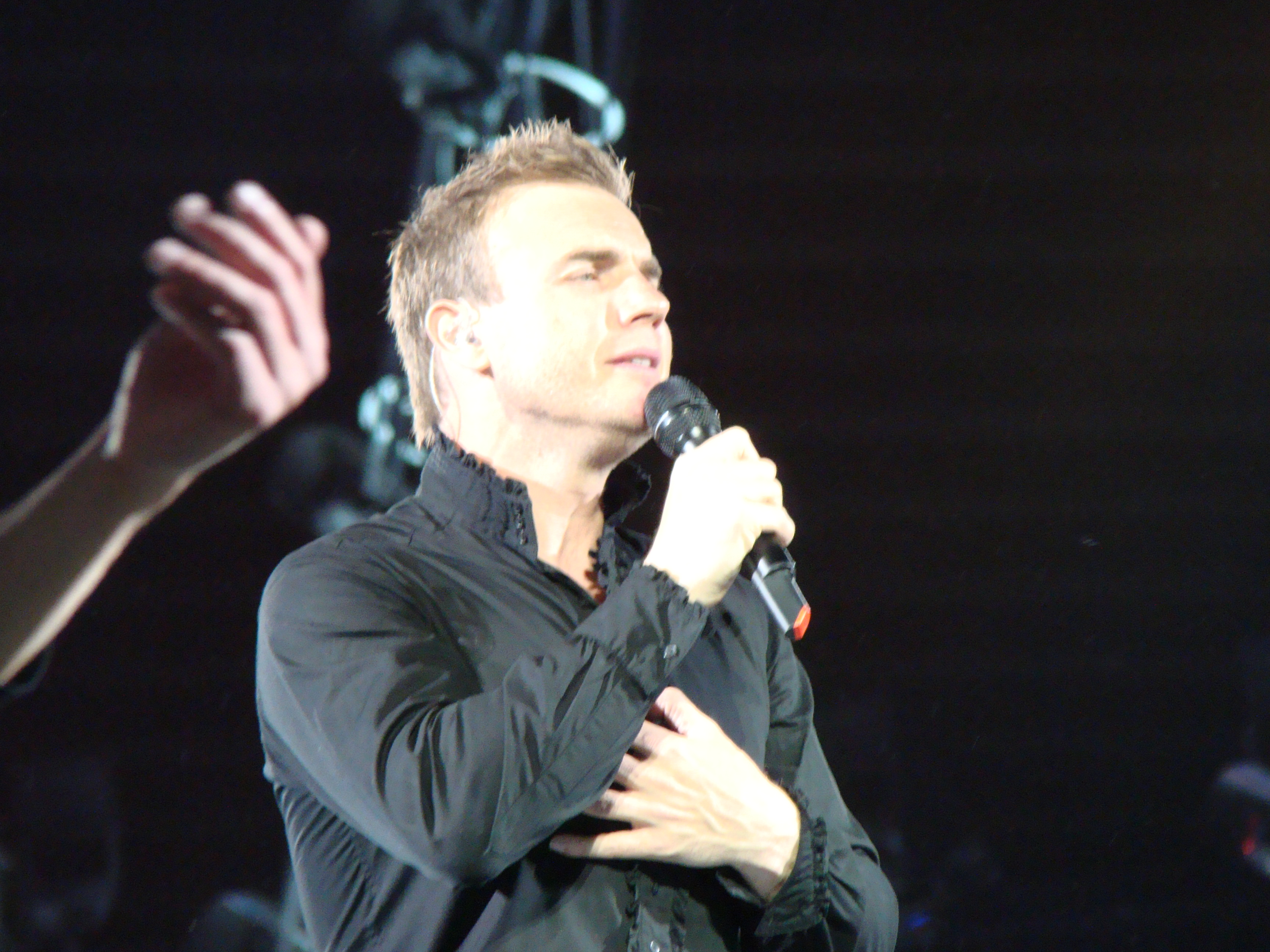
Take That performing at the Sunderland Stadium of Light in 2009

"Greatest Day", the first single from the album The Circus, made its radio premiere on 13 October 2008 and it was released on 24 November. It debuted at number 1 on the UK Singles Chart on 30 November 2008. An album launch party for The Circus was held in Paris on 2 December. On its first day of release The Circus sold 133,000 copies, and after four days on sale it sold 306,000 copies (going platinum) making The Circus the fastest-selling album of the year. The album reached number 1 on the UK Albums Chart on 7 December 2008 with total first-week sales of 432,490, the third-highest-opening sales week in UK history.

On 28 October 2008, on the Radio 1 Chris Moyles show, it was announced that Take That would be touring again in June/July 2009, covering the UK and Ireland. Tickets for the Take That Present: The Circus Live tour went on sale on 31 October. The promoters, SJM, have said that the band's tour is "the fastest-selling in UK history".

On 22 May 2008, Barlow and Donald attended the 2008 Ivor Novello Awards where Take That won the award for Most Performed Work with their single "Shine". Take That won the Sony Ericsson Tour of the Year award at the Vodafone music awards on 18 September 2008. They were unable to attend as they were in LA finishing off The Circus. They did send a video-link message, which was shown at the awards. On 22 November 2008, Take That appeared on week 7 of the talent show The X Factor where the finalists performed some of their greatest hits and Owen and Barlow made a guest appearance to personally coach the contestants. The band also performed on Children in Need 2008, singing their new single, "Greatest Day", before donating £250,000 to the charity from their Marks and Spencer fee. The band were also voted the Greatest Boy Band of All Time, reflecting their ongoing marketability and success in the pop arena, even after two decades.

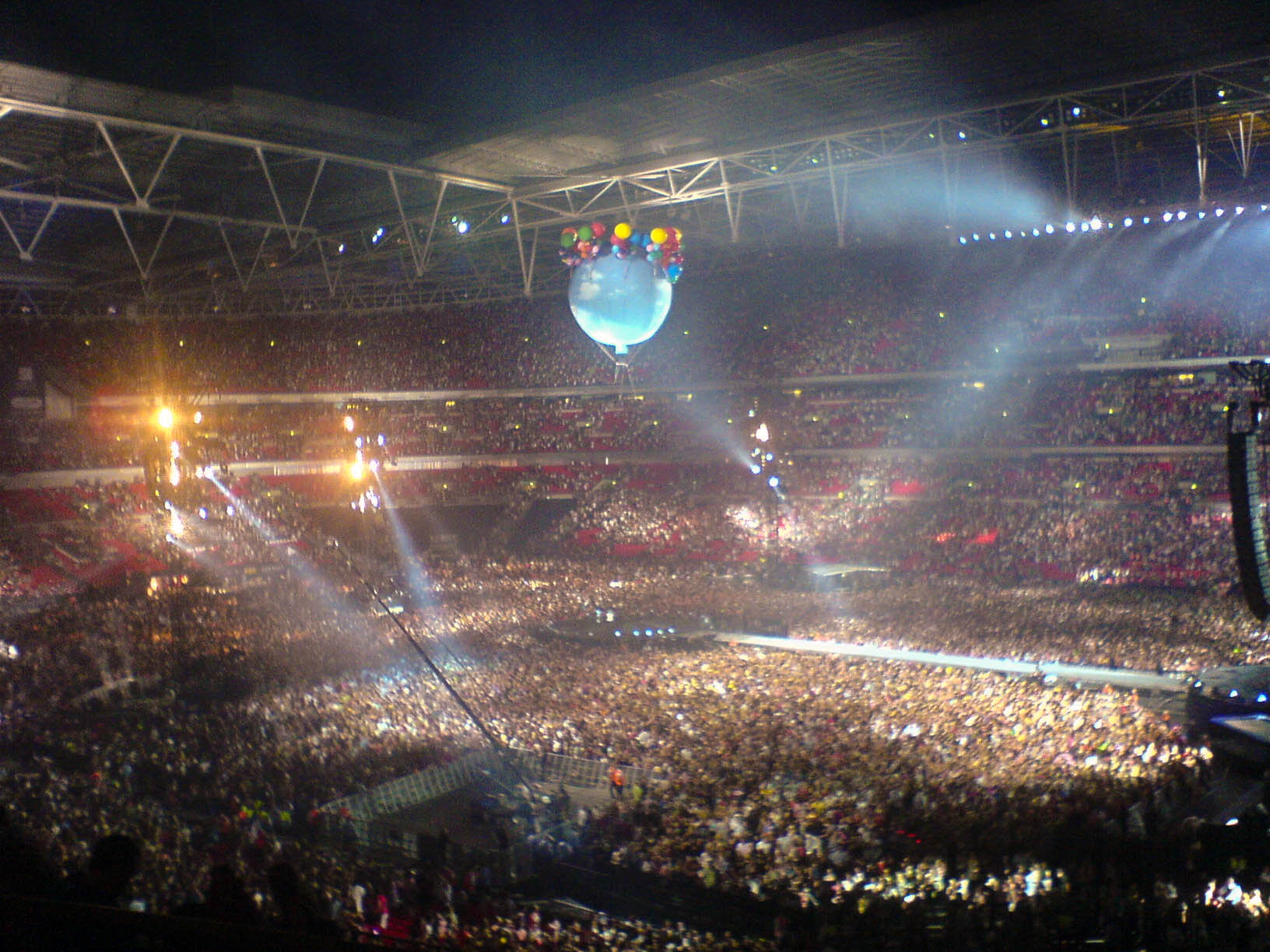
Take That playing Wembley Stadium in the final leg of their Circus Live Tour in July 2009

At the 2009 Brit Awards they were nominated for Best British Group and they performed "Greatest Day" at the ceremony. "Up All Night", the second single from The Circus, was released on 2 March 2009, and peaked at number 14 on the UK Singles Chart, despite heavy airplay. In Germany and Australia, The Garden was released as the second single instead. On 7 May 2009, Take That's official website confirmed that the third single from The Circus would be "Said It All" which was released on 15 June 2009, peaking at number 9 on the UK Singles chart. The video premiered on GMTV on 8 May 2009. It features all four band members dressed up as vintage circus clowns, which tied in with their forthcoming Take That Present: The Circus Live tour. Take That started their Circus Live tour at the Stadium of Light on 5 June 2009 in Sunderland and ended at the Wembley Stadium in London on 5 July 2009, which over 80,000 people attended. This tour quickly became the fastest-selling of all time, breaking all records by selling all of their 650,000 tickets in less than four-and-a-half hours.

In November 2009 Take That released the official DVD of their Circus tour, which became the fastest-selling music DVD of all time in the UK on its first day of release and stayed in the top 10 of the videos chart for over a year. This overtook the previous record sales holder, which was Take That's Beautiful World Live tour and stayed at the number 1 spot for 8 weeks. The following week Take That released their first live album, The Greatest Day – Take That Present: The Circus Live, which sold 98,000 copies on its first day of release and was certified Platinum in July 2013. "Hold Up a Light" was released as the fifth and final single from The Circus to radio stations and as a digital download to promote the release of the live album. The live album also featured a stripped-down session recorded live at the famous Abbey Road Studios in London. It featured the members singing the setlist from the preceding tour, albeit in a studio setting.

=== 2010–2011: Williams' return and Progress ===
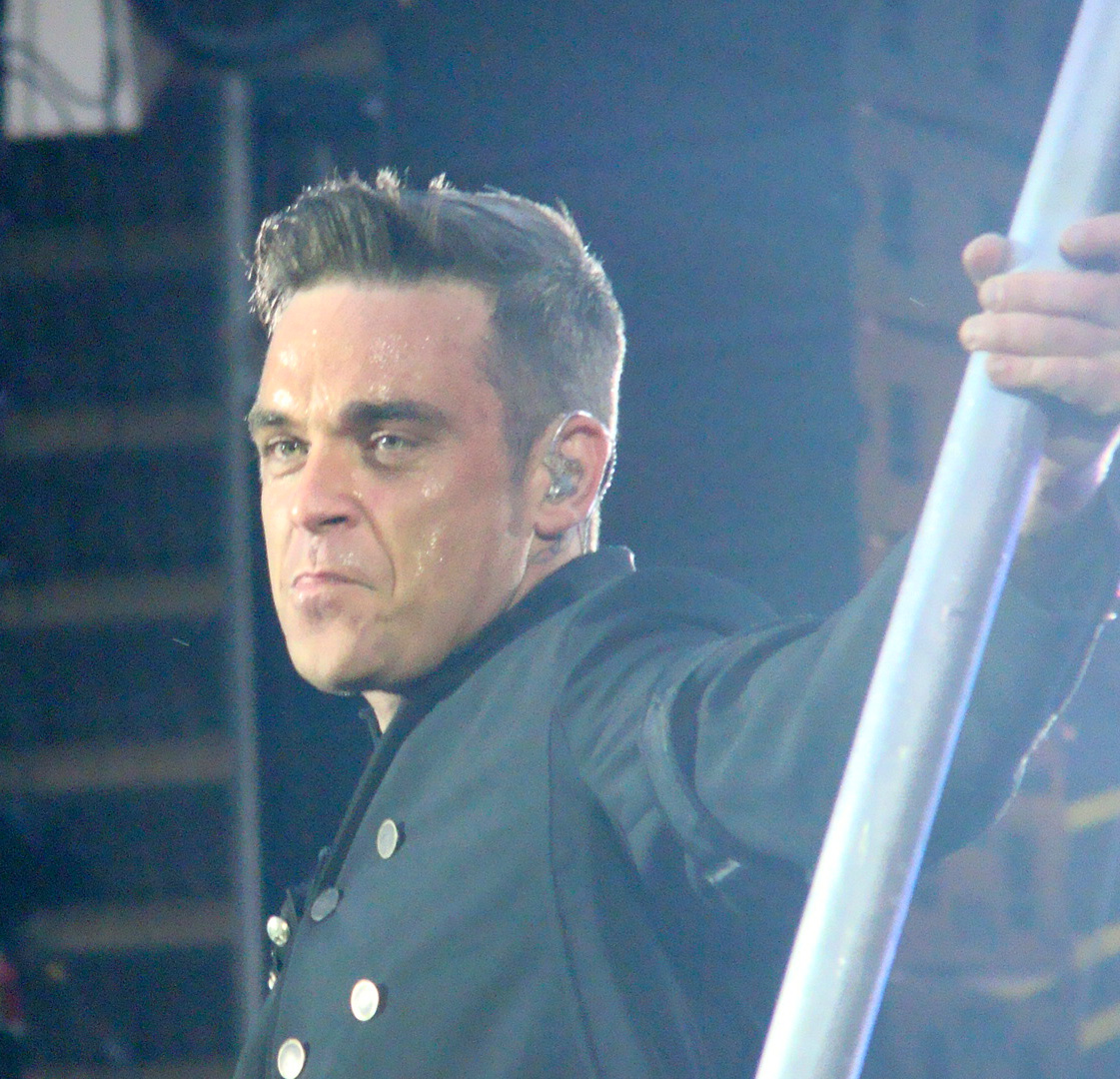
Williams rejoined the band in 2010

On 7 June 2010, the news broke of a single called "Shame", which had been written by Barlow and Williams and featured the vocals of both artists. This was the first time the pair had worked together since 1995 and appeared on the second greatest hits collection of Williams. "Heart and I", another track from the same album, was also co-written by Williams and Barlow. The single "Shame" peaked at number 2 on the UK Singles Chart while also achieving success throughout Europe, charting in over 19 countries.

After working with the band on new material in Los Angeles, on 15 July 2010 Robbie Williams announced he was returning to Take That. After months of working together, assembling new songs for a new album and even debating a band-name change to "The English", a joint statement between Williams and the group read, "The rumours are true ... Take That: the original lineup, have written and recorded a new album for release later this year." The statement went on to say, "Following months of speculation Gary Barlow, Howard Donald, Jason Orange, Mark Owen, and Robbie Williams confirmed they have been recording a new studio album as a five-piece, which they will release in November." The lead single from Take That's album Progress was announced as "The Flood" and was released 7 November as a digital download, and on 8 November as a physical copy, with the album released a week later on 15 November. The single peaked at number 2 in the UK Singles Charts and to date has sold over 500,000 copies in the UK alone. The single also achieved success across Europe, charting inside the top 10 in ten countries while also charting in another nine countries whilst also being nominated for an Ivor Novello Award for best work.

On 26 October the band announced that they were embarking on a UK stadium tour entitled Progress Live, starting in Sunderland on 27 May, and finishing with a record-breaking eight nights at London's Wembley Stadium in July 2011. It was also announced that Williams was to perform hit singles from his solo career during the tour. The band then played at some of the biggest venues across Europe for the second leg of the tour. The phenomenal demand for tickets across the country led to the web sites of all the major UK ticket suppliers either crashing or considerably slowing for hours on end. The demand and sheer volume of fans also created problems for the UK telephone network. Take That's Progress Live also broke all records for ticket sales selling over 1.1 million tickets in one day, smashing the previous box-office record set by Take That's Circus tour in 2008.

On the first day of release Progress became the fastest-selling album of the century, with 235,000 copies sold in just one day. The album reached number 1 in the UK, selling around 520,000 copies in its first week, becoming the second-fastest-selling album in history. After the release of Progress it was announced that Take That have become Amazon UK's top-selling music artist of all time.

Take That performing on stage at the 2011 Brit Awards with dancers in police-style riot gear

The album retained the number one spot for six consecutive weeks in the UK since its release, selling 2.4 million copies in the UK alone and becoming the best-selling album of 2010. Progress also achieved success across Europe where it debuted at number one in Ireland, Greece, Germany and Denmark. and the European Top 100 Albums chart. It also debuted inside the top 10 of the charts in Austria, Italy, the Netherlands, Sweden and Switzerland.

"Kidz" was announced as the second single from Progress, it was released 21 February 2011 and charted well across Europe. The band performed the song live at the 2011 Brit Awards hosted at The O2 Arena, where they won a Brit for Best British Group and were nominated for Best British Album. Their performance of "Kidz", praised by critics, involved a highly choreographed routine featuring dancers dressed in police-styled riot gear bearing the Take That symbol on the uniform and shields. On 19 May 2011, Take That announced a new EP entitled Progressed, which contained eight tracks written by the band since they had reunited as a five-piece. It was packaged alongside the album Progress and returned the band to number 1 in the UK Album Chart the week after it was released on 13 June 2011.

Take That announced that the Progress Live tour would be released worldwide as their second live album to date and was to be released on home media formats across the UK and Europe on 21 November 2011. The DVD debuted at number 1 on the UK Music Video top 40 in its first week on release and sold over 200,000 copies in two weeks of release in the UK alone. Take That's efforts were recognised further when they were awarded Virgin Media's Best Live Act of 2012.

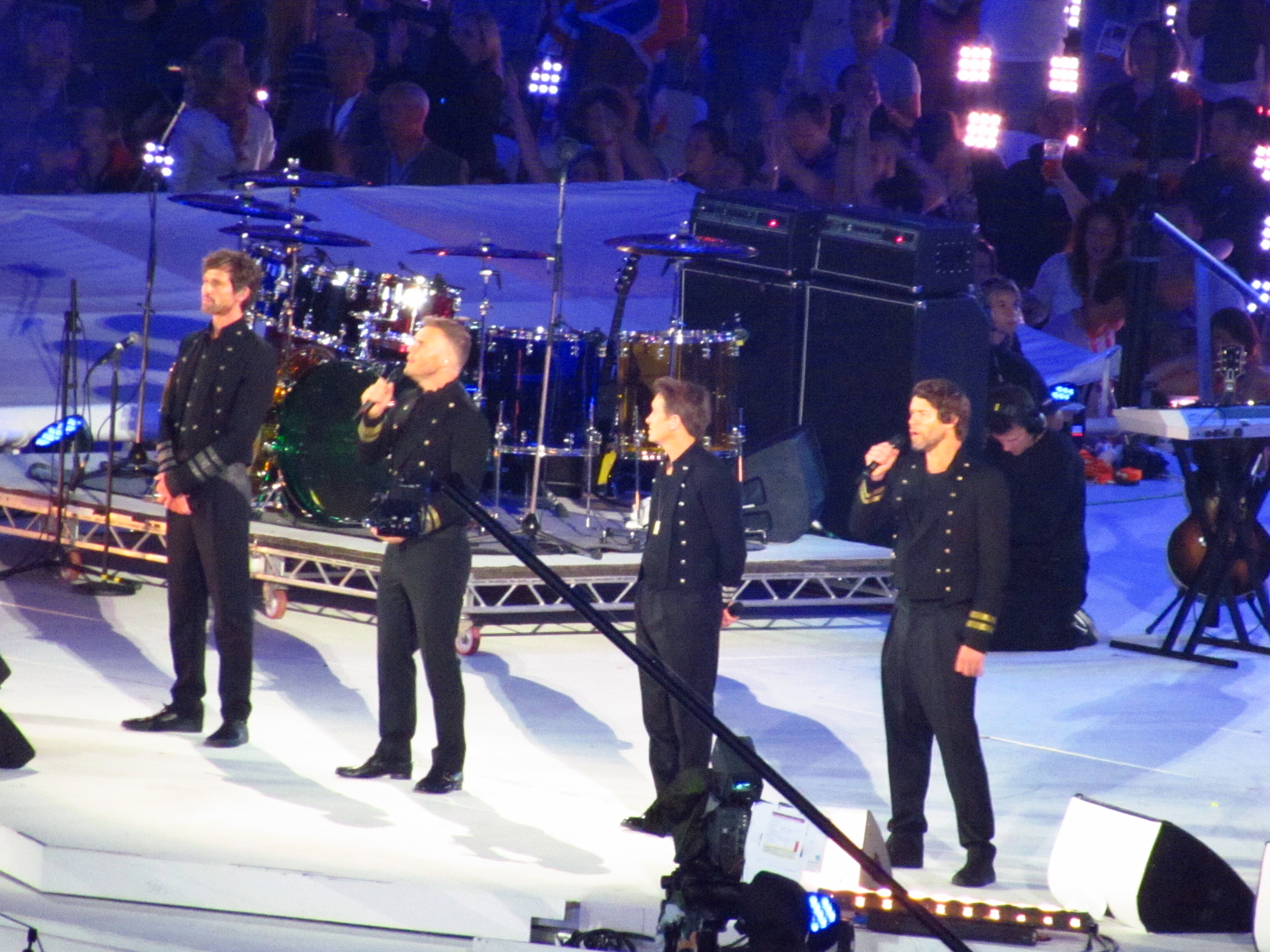
Take That performing "Rule the World" at the 2012 Olympic Games closing ceremony in London

On 4 October, it was reported that Take That were to take a break after the completion of the Progress tour, with Barlow continuing his role as a judge on The X Factor and Williams recording new solo material. Take That were presented with an Ivor Novello Award for their Outstanding Contribution to British Music in May 2012.

In August 2012, Take That performed at the closing ceremony of the 2012 Summer Olympics, despite Barlow announcing that his daughter had been stillborn the previous week. The performance earned him praise for appearing live so soon after the tragedy. Williams was due to perform with the band but dropped out due to his wife giving birth at around the same time and thus the group performed as a four-piece. In November 2012, Take That reunited as a five-piece for the last time to perform "Never Forget" at the Music Industry Trust Awards. In 2013, Donald became a judge on the German version of the television dancing show Got to Dance.

=== 2014–2015: Line-up change and III ===
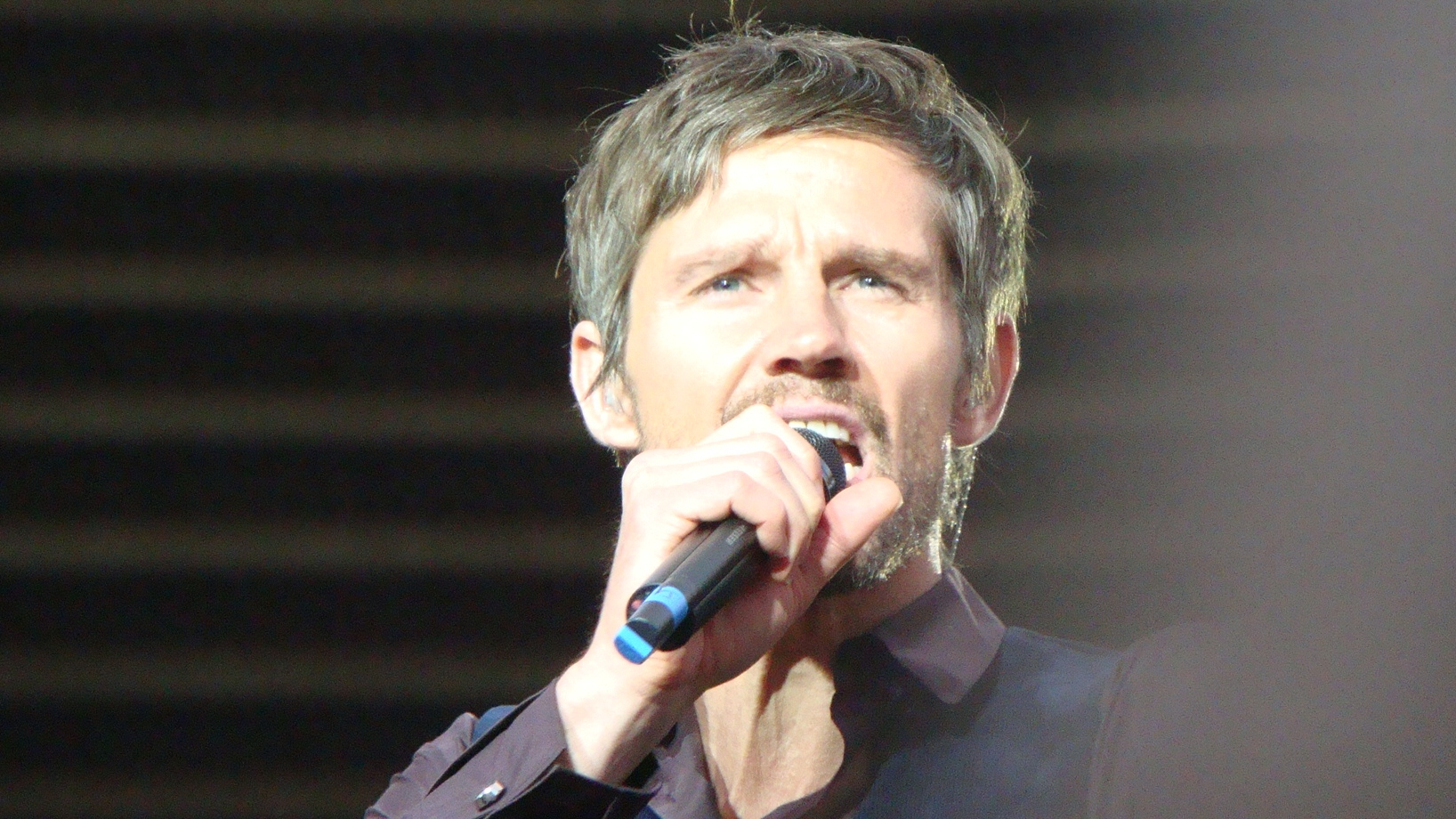
Jason Orange left the band in 2014

In May 2013, Owen announced that Take That was to begin recording their seventh studio album in 2014, and on 14 January 2014, Donald and Barlow both tweeted that Take That had entered the studio to begin recording the album, although it was not initially clear if Williams was present at these recording sessions. On 28 April 2014, Williams announced on Twitter he was to become a father for a second time, and consequently suggested he would not be able to join Take That on their album and tour. Although welcome to return to the band at any time, Williams chose not to return for group's seventh and eighth studio albums and their accompanying tours, focusing instead on his solo commitments. He continued to write music with his colleagues and has performed with the group on several occasions since 2011's Progress tour and plans on returning at some point in the future.

On 24 September 2014, it was announced that Jason Orange had left the band. He said: 'At a band meeting last week I confirmed to Mark, Gary and Howard that I do not wish to commit to recording and promoting a new album. 'At the end of The Progress Tour I began to question whether it might be the right time for me to not continue on with Take That,' he continued. 'There have been no fallings out, only a decision on my part that I no longer wish to do this,' he added. Barlow, Donald, and Owen issued a joint statement about Orange's decision which said: "This is a sad day for us. Jason leaving is a huge loss both professionally and even more so personally ... Jason's energy and belief in what this band could achieve has made it what it is today, and we'll forever be grateful for his enthusiasm, dedication and inspiration over the years." A day after the announcement, Robbie Williams took to Twitter to show support of Orange's decision. "Mr Orange. Until we ride again. Much love, Bro.", Williams tweeted.

On 10 October 2014, Take That unveiled their first song as a three-piece and lead single from their upcoming album. Titled "These Days", it was released on 23 November 2014 and went to No. 1 in the UK Singles Chart, knocking Band Aid 30 off the top spot and becoming their 12th number one single. The album itself, called III, was released on 28 November 2014 and became the band's seventh No. 1 album. It was then followed by a sell-out arena tour entitled Take That Live. On 14 October 2015, the band announced their new single "Hey Boy", released on 16 October, which is the first single from the 2015 re-release of III. The 2015 edition of the album was released on 20 November.

In December 2015, British media buzzed about the group embarking on a stint in Las Vegas, starting in 2017. Reports indicated the group impressed U.S. promoters and would headline their own residency show. Many venues circulated, including The AXIS at the Planet Hollywood Resort & Casino, The Foundry at SLS Las Vegas and the Linq Theater at The LINQ Hotel & Casino. Local newspaper, the Las Vegas Sun writes that everything is still unconfirmed, despite Barlow confirming the rumour on Twitter.

=== 2016–2017: Wonderland ===
On 2 February 2016, in an interview with The Sun, Barlow revealed that Take That would release their eighth studio album later in the year. On 4 May 2016, English drum and bass duo Sigma announced their newest single would feature Take That. "Cry" received its first radio play on 20 May 2016 and was released on that date. On 21 October 2016, the band posted a teaser on their social media pages and website depicting the logo of the band flickering with the hashtag "#WONDERLAND". The following day, it was announced that their new album, titled Wonderland, was scheduled to be released on 24 March 2017. It was then followed by a UK and Ireland arena tour entitled Wonderland Live, that commenced on 5 May 2017 at the Genting Arena in Birmingham. On 17 February 2017, the lead single of Wonderland was released. Titled "Giants", it debuted at 13 in the UK charts, which became the band's 24th UK top 20 single.

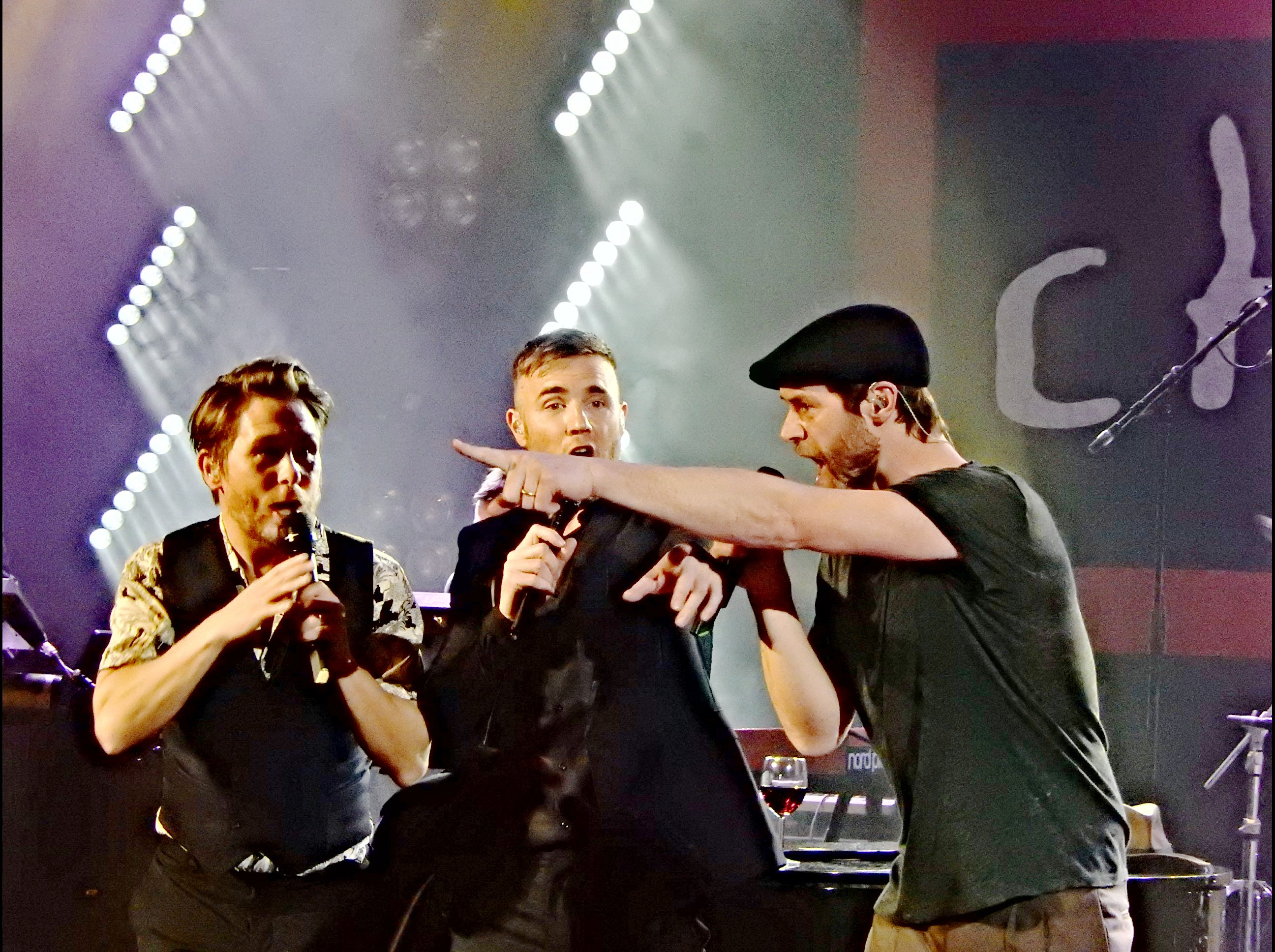
The current line-up of Take That performing at Shepherds Bush Empire in 2015

On 8 April 2017, ITV aired a specially commissioned hour-length television special titled An Evening with Take That, where the band performed some songs from the album, along with some old classics including "Never Forget", "Back for Good" and "Rule the World". The band also took part in a Q&A session with the audience members. On 27 April, it was announced on Twitter that "New Day" was to be released as the next single from the album Wonderland. The band were seen recording the music video in a field in Luton the days leading up the opening night of the Wonderland Live tour. Due to the Manchester Arena bombing just days before they were due to perform at the venue, their Manchester and Liverpool dates were rescheduled or relocated. The band returned a month later to perform at the One Love Manchester benefit concert.

On 16 September 2017, Barlow, Owen and Donald were set to perform a special one-off show in Jersey, after a fan bid more than £1.2 million to win a performance from the band. This then turned in to a ticketed charity event where the money from tickets sold went towards benefiting Children in Need. The auction was held on BBC Radio 2. On 11 November 2017, Take That began their foreign tour in Perth, Australia, the first time they have performed in the country in over twenty years. They also played in New Zealand, United Arab Emirates and Israel for the first time. Unlike the other tours, a DVD for Wonderland Live was not released. Instead, it was broadcast on Sky 1 on 23 December and in cinemas.

=== 2018–2020: 30th Anniversary and Odyssey ===
On 16 July 2018, while performing at first Hits Radio Live at the Manchester Arena, Barlow, Donald and Owen confirmed that they would be touring in 2019. The tour was a Greatest Hits tour and celebrated the 30th anniversary of the band. There was also a Greatest Hits album, Odyssey, which was released on 23 November 2018. The Greatest Hits album features existing songs from their back catalogue that have been re-imagined and three brand-new songs. It also includes collaborations with Boyz II Men, Lulu, Sigma and Barry Gibb. Odyssey reached number one in the UK album chart and was certified as a platinum selling record. The following year, Odyssey Live, the recording of their tour, reached number 5, becoming the band's 13th top 5 album, with the DVD becoming the biggest live music sale of 2019.

In May 2020, Barlow, Donald, and Owen reunited with Williams for a virtual performance from their respective homes, hosted by price comparison website Compare the Market, to raise money for the music charity Nordoff Robbins and Crew Nation.

=== 2022–2025: This Life ===
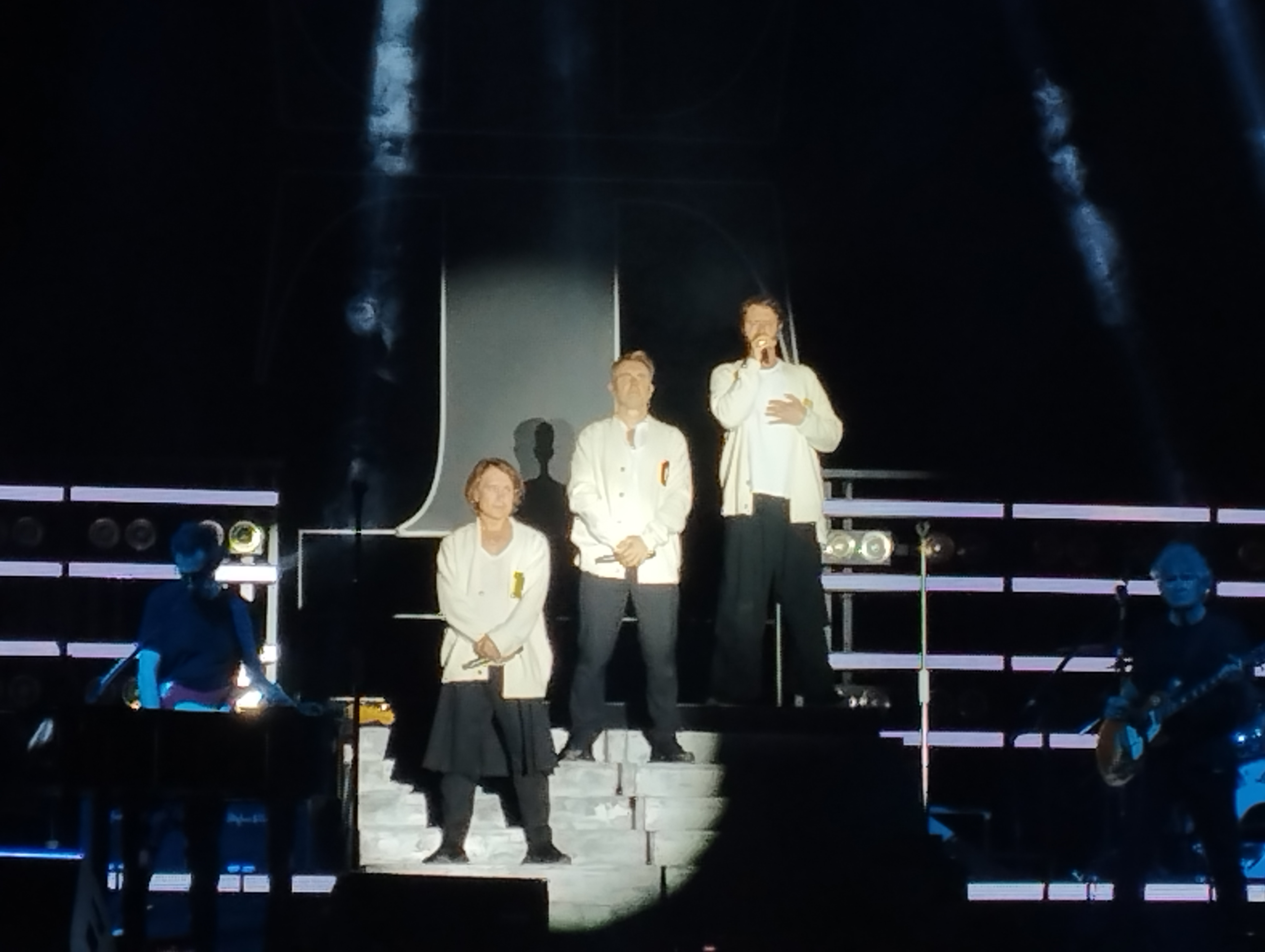
The band performing for the This Is Life European Tour in Summer 2024

In June 2022, Barlow confirmed that the band had begun working on their ninth studio album due for a late 2023 release. The album was also confirmed by Owen earlier in May. In October 2022, it was announced that Take That were to perform at BST Hyde Park on 1 July 2023, supported by The Script and the Sugababes.

On 5 May 2023, the band released a rework of "Greatest Day" which featured Calum Scott and German artist Robin Schulz. Two days later, the band performed at King Charles III's Coronation Concert, held at Windsor Castle. On 15 June 2023, the band performed in Leicester Square for the premiere of the Take That movie musical Greatest Days which was released in cinemas the following day. The film was later released on home streaming service Amazon Prime Video.

On 20 September 2023, the band announced that their new single "Windows" was to be released on 22 September. That evening, the band teased upcoming live shows with their logo projected on arenas and stadiums around the UK & Ireland, including London's O2 Arena, Bristol Ashton Gate Stadium and Manchester's new arena Co-Op Live. On the release day of "Windows", it was announced that their ninth album, titled This Life, would be released on 24 November 2023. This Life on Tour was also announced, starting on 13 April 2024 at Sheffield Utilita Arena. To celebrate the launch on the new album, a 6 episode podcast featuring the band was announced with a new episode each week counting down the release of the album. On 17 October, the band released the second single "Brand New Sun". On 3 November, the band released the third single "This Life". Just three days after the release of This Life, the album claimed the biggest first-week sales for a British Act in 2023 exceeding sales for albums by Lewis Capaldi, Ed Sheeran and the Rolling Stones.

On 10 December 2023, the band headlined the second day of Capital FM's Jingle Bell Ball at London's O2 Arena which included a special performance of "Relight My Fire" with Rita Ora.

On 13 January 2024, the band performed a concert as part of the opening day of the 2023–24 SailGP championship in Abu Dhabi.

On 25 March 2024, the band announced that their new single "You and Me" was to be released on 28 March, in order to promote the This Life on Tour shows. Following this on 26 April, the band released another single, "All Wrapped Up", along with an announcement of a deluxe edition of the This Life album, which was to contain the former two tracks, along with three other studio tracks.

On 5 April 2024 the band announced 'The Greatest Weekend', a festival spanning four days, held in Ta' Qali, Malta. The event ran from 17 to 20 October 2024 and featured the band performing the album Everything Changes live in its entirety for the first time since its release in 1993, and their greatest hits. The event also featured nightclub events, pool parties, and special guests including the Sugababes, Sam Ryder, Ella Henderson, Daniel Bedingfield, Heather Small, Gok Wan and a DJ set from band member Howard Donald.

On 20 August 2024, production company Fulwell 73 and Netflix announced a behind the scenes documentary following the band's journey featuring unseen archive and new interviews. On 27 December 2025, it was confirmed the series titled Take That consisting of 3 episodes would be released on 27 January 2026.

In February 2025, the band performed their rework of "Greatest Day" at the 78th British Academy Film Awards which featured in the nominated film Anora. The band also performed at the O2 Arena to celebrate 75 years of Formula One.

=== 2026–onwards: The Circus Live and Dreamers ===
After a series of teasers and a countdown, the band announced on 19 September 2025 that they would be performing The Circus Live tour, based on their previous tour of the same name, in Summer 2026. In this same announcement it was revealed that in late 2026, their tenth studio album, with the placeholder name TT10, would be released.

On 20 March 2026, the lead single from the band's upcoming album, "You're a Superstar", was released, which had previously featured at the end of their three-part documentary earlier in the year. The band released a second single, "Sweet July", on 3 July, having previously teased it at a London show. On 28 August, the band confirmed their tenth studio album would be named Dreamers supported by the Dreamers Tour in 2027. On 1 October, the band confirmed the album would be released on 20 November.

== In other media and charity ==
In April 2006, EMI licensed the band's songs to be used in the musical Never Forget, a musical based on songs of the band from the 1990s. Take That posted and then later removed a statement on their website distancing themselves from it.

Take That wrote and recorded the theme song "Rule the World" for the film Stardust, directed by Matthew Vaughn, which was released in cinemas across the globe in October 2007. In 2007, their song "Back for Good" was used as part of the soundtrack for popular Korean drama Coffee Prince.

Take That presented their own TV show Take That Come to Town, a variety show in which they performed some of their biggest hits. The show also featured comedy sketches with one of Peter Kay's alter egos Geraldine McQueen. It aired on 7 December 2008 on ITV1. Sony launched their first Take That video game, SingStar Take That in 2009 for the PlayStation 3.

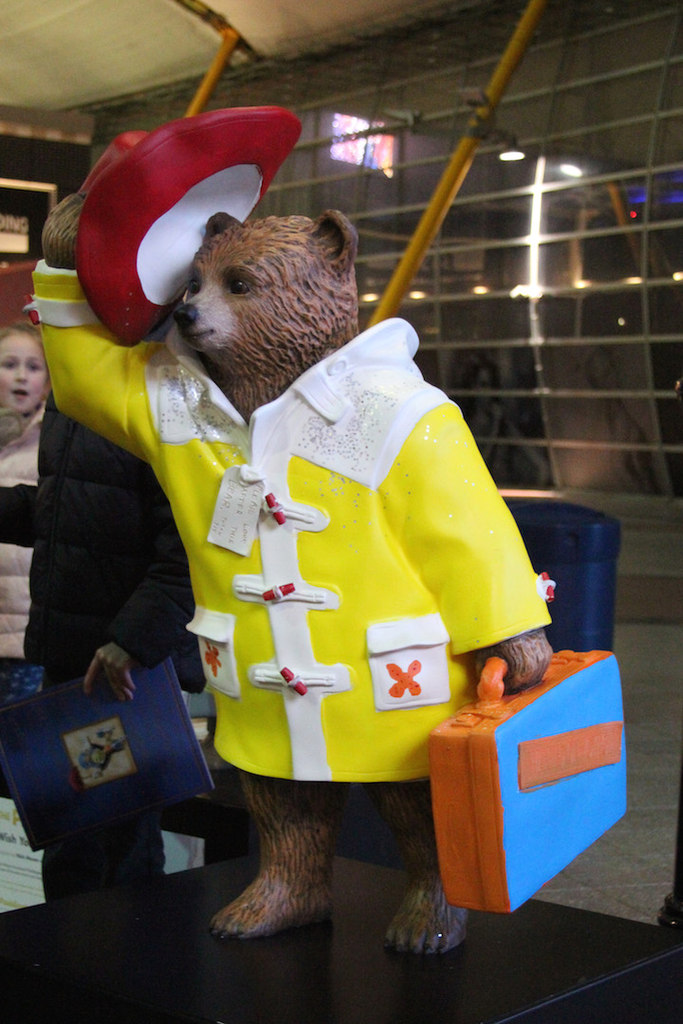
The band's Paddington Bear statue—themed "Paddington That"—outside the O2 Arena in London, auctioned to raise funds for the NSPCC

In November 2010, ITV aired Take That: Look Back, Don't Stare, a black-and-white documentary which focused on the band working together for the first time in 15 years. Through a series of interviews, the band look back at their achievements while also looking forward to what the future holds for them. On 18 November 2010, Williams and Barlow appeared together live on television for the first time on the Popstars program in Germany singing their hit "Shame".

In 2011, Take That's song "Love Love" was used in the credits of the 2011 film X-Men: First Class and later, "When We Were Young" was chosen as the main theme for The Three Musketeers movie. In 2015, the song "Get Ready for It" from their album III, was chosen as the theme song for the film Kingsman: The Secret Service.

In 2014, the band designed a Paddington Bear statue, which was exhibited outside the O2 Arena in London (one of 50 placed around the city). The statues were auctioned to raise funds for the National Society for the Prevention of Cruelty to Children (NSPCC).

In 2017, Take That launched The Band, a musical written by Tim Firth featuring the five winners of Let It Shine and some of Take That's biggest hits. Take That, including Robbie Williams, were billed as executive producers.

The group's music is regularly featured in the Channel 4 show Derry Girls, notably in the third episode of the second series, when the lead characters sneak off to attend the 1993 Take That concert in Belfast; the episode features the music video for "Pray" and ends on footage of the band performing "Everything Changes".

== Artistry ==
Early in their career, Take That were known for party anthems such as "Do What U Like" and more mature ballads such as "A Million Love Songs" and "Back for Good". Since reuniting in 2006, they have become more experimental: their post-2006 albums Beautiful World and The Circus have featured "stadium-filling pop-rock" while Progress largely leaned towards electropop. Having been dubbed the "comeback kings" by the media for their highly successful reunion, the group has won widespread praise for their seamless transformation from teen idols to "man band" without overly relying on nostalgia, instead showcasing a more mature image and sound and reinventing themselves while maintaining their artistic integrity. Jude Rogers of The Guardian commented on Take That's post-reunion success, in light of a string of reunions by the group's disbanded counterparts from the 1990s: "Only Take That are penetrating pop's wider consciousness by becoming a man-band rather than a boy-band, singing mature, proper pop songs that cross the generations."

Take That have garnered critical acclaim and popularity as consummate live performers and for their musical output. Their domestic concert tours have been described as "some of the most flamboyant, imaginative and extravagant pop tours around". Aside from covers, all of their material is composed by the members themselves; Barlow was initially the principal songwriter who received sole credit but the other members have since taken a more active role in the composition and production process, including playing instruments for the backing track.

== Band members ==
=== Current ===
- Gary Barlow (1990–1996, 2005–present)
- Howard Donald (1990–1996, 2005–present)
- Mark Owen (1990–1996, 2005–present)

=== Former ===
- Jason Orange (1990–1996, 2005–2014)
- Robbie Williams (1990–1995, 2010–2014)

== Awards and nominations ==
Award	Year	Nominee(s)	Category	Result	Ref.
Billboard Music Awards	2012	Themselves	Top Touring Artist	Nominated	
Brit Awards	1993	Themselves	British Breakthrough Act	Nominated	
Brit Awards	1993	"It Only Takes a Minute"	British Single of the Year	Nominated	
Brit Awards	1993	"A Million Love Songs"	British Single of the Year	Nominated	
Brit Awards	1993	"Could It Be Magic"	British Single of the Year	Won	
Brit Awards	1994	"Pray"	British Single of the Year	Won	
Brit Awards	1994	"Pray"	British Video of the Year	Won	
Brit Awards	1994	Themselves	British Group	Nominated	
Brit Awards	1996	"Back for Good"	British Video of the Year	Nominated	
Brit Awards	1996	"Back for Good"	British Single of the Year	Won	
Brit Awards	2007	"Patience"	British Single of the Year	Won	
Brit Awards	2008	"Shine"	British Single of the Year	Won	
Brit Awards	2008	Themselves	British Live Act	Won	
Brit Awards	2008	Themselves	British Group	Nominated	
Brit Awards	2008	Beautiful World	British Album of the Year	Nominated	
Brit Awards	2009	Themselves	British Group	Nominated	
Brit Awards	2010	The Beatles Medley	Live Performance of 30 Years	Nominated	
Brit Awards	2011	Themselves	British Group	Won	
Brit Awards	2011	Progress	British Album of the Year	Nominated	
Echo Music Prize	1995	Themselves	Best International Group	Nominated	
Echo Music Prize	1996	Themselves	Best International Group	Nominated	
Echo Music Prize	2009	Themselves	Best International Group	Nominated	
Echo Music Prize	2011	Themselves	Best International Group	Won	
Ivor Novello Awards	1994	"Pray"	Best Contemporary Song	Won	
Ivor Novello Awards	1994	Gary Barlow	Songwriter of the Year	Won	
Ivor Novello Awards	1994	"Babe"	The Best Selling Song	Nominated	
Ivor Novello Awards	1996	"Back for Good"	The Best Selling Song	Won	
Ivor Novello Awards	1996	"Back for Good"	Most Performed Work	Won	
Ivor Novello Awards	1996	"Back for Good"	International Hit of the Year	Nominated	
Ivor Novello Awards	1996	"Back for Good"	Best Song Musically & Lyrically	Nominated	
Ivor Novello Awards	2008	"Shine"	Most Performed Work	Won	
Ivor Novello Awards	2012	Themselves	Outstanding Contribution to British Music	Won	
Ivor Novello Awards	2012	"The Flood"	Most Performed Work	Nominated	
MTV Europe Music Awards	1994	Themselves	Best Group	Won	
MTV Europe Music Awards	1995	Themselves	Best Live Act	Won	
MTV Video Music Awards	1994	"Babe"	International Viewer's Choice	Won	
Popjustice £20 Music Prize	2011	"The Flood"	Best British Pop Single	Nominated	
Virgin Media Music Awards	2006	Themselves	Best Comeback	Nominated	
Virgin Media Music Awards	2007	Themselves	Best UK Act	Nominated	
Virgin Media Music Awards	2007	"Shine"	Best Track	Nominated	
Virgin Media Music Awards	2008	Themselves	Best UK Act	Nominated	
Virgin Media Music Awards	2008	The Circus	Best Album	Nominated	
Virgin Media Music Awards	2008	"Greatest Day"	Best Track	Nominated	
Virgin Media Music Awards	2009	Themselves	Best Group	Won	
Virgin Media Music Awards	2010	Themselves	Best Group	Nominated	
Virgin Media Music Awards	2011	Themselves	Best Group	Nominated	
Virgin Media Music Awards	2011	Themselves	Best Live Act	Won	
Virgin Media Music Awards	2011	"Kidz"	Best Video	Nominated	
Vodafone Live Music Awards	2007	The Ultimate Tour	Live Music DVD	Nominated	

Year	Nominee / work	Award	Result
2025	Take That	Ticketmaster Music Awards UK for Best Live Act	Won
2016	Take That	Silver Clef Award for Best Live Act	Nominated
2015	"These Days"	UK Music Video Awards for Best Art Direction	Nominated
2012	"Pray"	The Guardian Music Award for Best Number 1 Single	Won
2012	"Back for Good"	The Official Charts Company UK Recognition award for United Kingdom's Favourite Number One Single	Nominated
2011
2011	Progress Live	Audio Pro International Awards for Best Live Sound Event	Won
2011	Progress Live	Audio Pro International Awards Grand Prix Award	Won
2011	Take That	Phonographic Performance Limited Award for most played UK artist	Won
2011	"Kidz"	Spex German Entertainment for Best Music Video	Won
2011	The Circus Live Tour	Greatest Event ever at Wembley Stadium	Nominated
2011	Take That	Virgin Media for Best Group	Won
2010
2010	"Up All Night"	UK Music Video Awards for Best Art Direction	Nominated
2010	"The Flood"	iTunes Award for Best Single	Nominated
2010	Progress	iTunes Award for Best Album	Nominated
2010	Take That	Q Award Hall of Fame	Won
2009	Take That	GQ Men of the Year Awards for Best Band	Won
2009	Take That	Q Award for Best Live Act	Won
2009	"Greatest Day"	Q Award for Best Single	Won
2009	Take That	Silver Clef Award	Won
2008	"Rule the World"	Virgin for Best Single	Won
2008	Take That	Sony Ericsson Tour of the Year Award for Take That Arena Tour	Won
2006	Take That	Q Idol Award	Won
1995	Take That	Silver Clef Award	Won
1994	Everything Changes	Mercury Prize for Best Album	Nominated
1993	Take That	Silver Clef Award for Best Newcomer	Won

== Discography ==
- Take That & Party (1992)
- Everything Changes (1993)
- Nobody Else (1995)
- Beautiful World (2006)
- The Circus (2008)
- Progress (2010)
- III (2014)
- Wonderland (2017)
- This Life (2023)
- Dreamers (2026)

== Tours ==
- Party Tour (1992–1993)
- Everything Changes Tour (1993–1994)
- Pops Tour (1994–1995)
- Nobody Else Tour (1995)
- The Ultimate Tour (2006)
- Beautiful World Tour (2007)
- Take That Present The Circus Live (2009)
- Progress Live (2011)
- Take That Live (2015)
- Wonderland Live (2017)
- Greatest Hits Live (2019)
- This Life on Tour (2024)
- The Circus Live – Summer 2026 (2026)
- Dreamers Tour (2027)

== See also ==
- List of best-selling boy bands
- List of 1990s one-hit wonders in the United States
