= You're a Superstar (Take That song) =

Single by Take That

from the album Dreamers
- Released: 20 March 2026
- Genre: Pop
- Length: 3:18
- Label: EMI
- Songwriters: Gary Barlow; Mark Owen; Howard Donald; Jamie Scott
- Producers: Stuart Price; Jamie Scott; Martin Hannah

Take That singles chronology
"Said It All (Jax Jones Rework)" (2026)	"You're a Superstar" (2026)	"Sweet July" (2026)

Music video
- "You're a Superstar" on YouTube

"You're a Superstar" is a song by the English pop group Take That. It was released by EMI Records on 20 March 2026 as the lead single from their tenth studio album, Dreamers (2026). It was written by Take That and Jamie Scott and produced by Jamie Scott, Martin Hannah and Stuart Price. The song features Gary Barlow on lead vocals.

== Background ==
The song was first teased during the closing credits of their Netflix documentary Take That. Gary Barlow has described the song and new direction as "stadium sounds" with high-energy "arms in the air" anthems designed to surprise fans on tour.

== Critical reception ==
Pip Ellwood-Hughes from Entertainment Focus stated the song was "vintage Take That; with its driving beat, soaring chorus, heartfelt lyrics and classic harmonies." Callum Crumlish, writing for MyLondon, said: "The song delivers what fans love most from the three-man group; lyrics that evoke powerful emotions, endless harmonies, and an exceptional score behind it."

== Track listing ==
- Digital single
1. "You're a Superstar" – 3:18

== Personnel ==
- Gary Barlow – lead vocals
- Mark Owen – backing vocals
- Howard Donald – backing vocals
- Jack Britten, Marti Perramon - backing vocals
- Jamie Scott - piano, Programmed By Programming, electric guitar
- Luke Burgoyne, Seb Maletka-Catala - assistant mixing engineer
- Jan "Stan" Kybert - immersive mixing engineer
- Matt Colton - mastering engineer
- Dan Grech-Marguerat - mixing engineer
- Ryan Carline - engineer
- Stuart Price - keyboards, guitar, drum programming, bass
- Take That - performer
- Jamie Scott, Martin Hannah, Stuart Price - producers
- Dan Grech-Marguerat - Programmed By Programming
- Martin Hannah - Programmed By Programming, bass, electric guitar
- Gary Barlow, Howard Donald, Jamie Scott, Mark Owen - songwriters

== Charts ==
=== Weekly charts ===
Weekly chart performance
Chart (2026)	Peak position
Lithuania Airplay (TopHit)	29
UK Singles Downloads (Official Charts)	9
UK Singles Sales (OCC)	9

=== Monthly charts ===
Monthly chart performance
Chart (2026)	Peak position
Lithuania Airplay (TopHit)	58
