= Jamie Norton =

British musician and songwriter

- Origin: United Kingdom
- Genres: pop music; instrumental
- Occupations: songwriter; composer; arranger
- Instruments: piano; keyboard
- Website: jamienorton.co.uk

Jamie Norton is a British musician and songwriter performing under the moniker of Fougère since 2020. He has written songs with Take That including the 2009 hit Hold Up a Light.

In April 2019, Norton and Take That's Mark Owen released a stripped-back version of Hold Up a Light in aid of the Salisbury Hospice Charity. The reworked single was a fundraising tribute to the hospice that had cared for Norton's mother the previous April and featured pupils from Grasmere Primary in North London including Norton's sons Ned and Miller.

In October 2020, Norton made his debut release under the moniker of Fougère with the single Movement, followed by a remix from Hot Chip's Joe Goddard in November. The second single Descent was released in January 2021, followed by the debut album Still Life in May 2021.

== Discography ==
=== Albums ===
as Fougère

- Still Life (May 2021, Studio Fougére)

=== Singles ===
as Fougère

- Movement (October 2020, Studio Fougére)
- Descent (January 2021, Studio Fougére)

== See also ==
- Songs written by Jamie Norton
