= Brit Award for International Male Solo Artist =

British music award

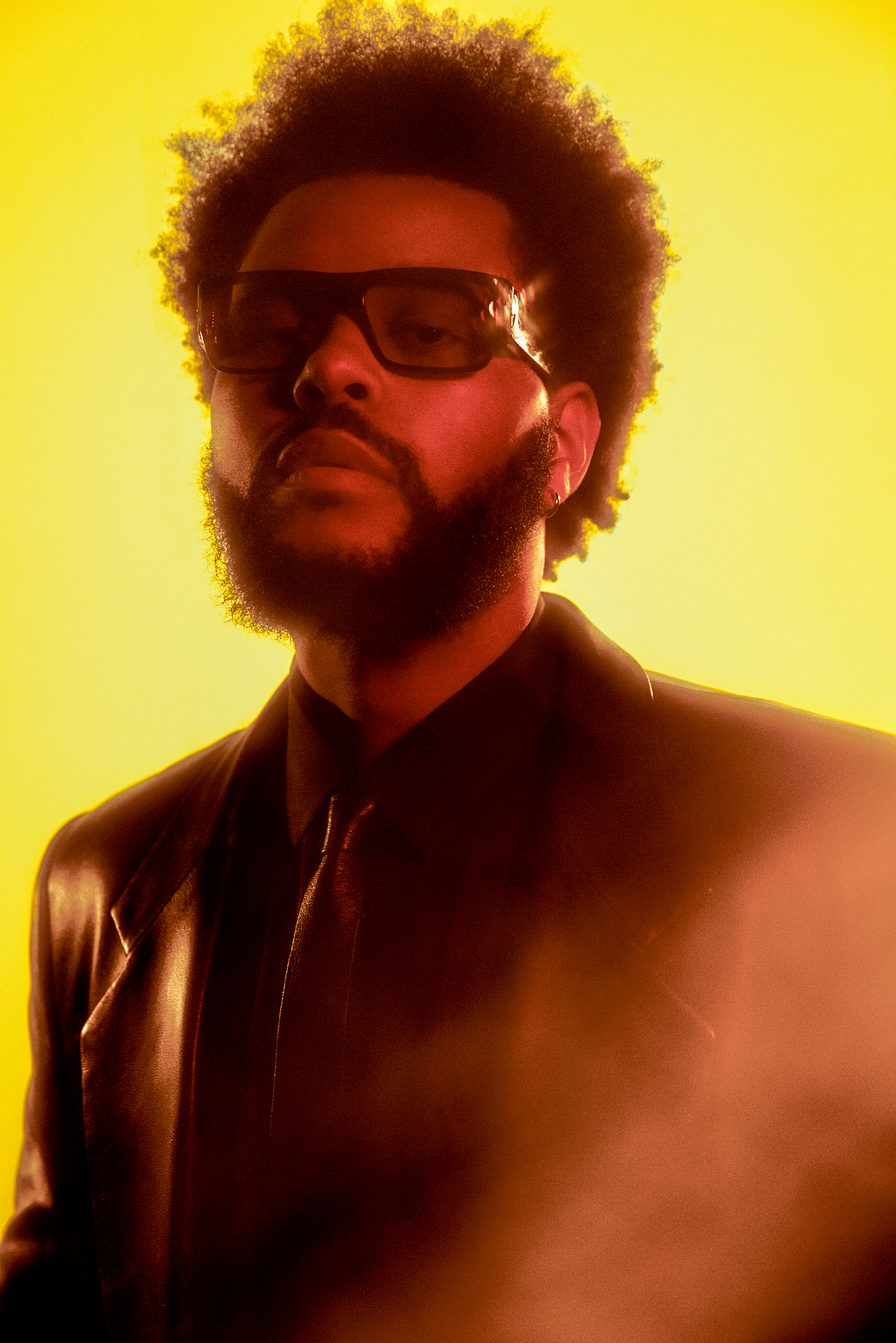
- 2021 winner The Weeknd
- Awarded for: Achievement in Excellent International Male Solo Artist
- Country: United Kingdom (UK)
- Presented by: British Phonographic Industry (BPI)
- First award: 1989
- Currently held by: The Weeknd (2021)

Highlights
- Most awards: Prince (musician), Beck, Eminem and Kanye West (3)
- Most nominations: Beck (10)
- Website: www.brits.co.uk

The Brit Award for International Male Solo Artist was an award given by the British Phonographic Industry (BPI), an organisation which represents record companies and artists in the United Kingdom. The accolade is presented at the Brit Awards, an annual celebration of British and international music. The winners and nominees were determined by the Brit Awards voting academy with over one-thousand members, which comprise record labels, publishers, managers, agents, media, and previous winners and nominees.

== History ==
The award was first presented in 1989 as International Male Solo Artist. The accolade was not handed out at the 1990, 1992 and 1993 ceremonies, with the award for International Solo Artist (given to a male or female artist) being awarded instead. The award for International Male Solo Artist was reinstated in 1994, but was again retired in favour of the gender-neutral award following the abolition of gendered categories in 2022.

International Male Solo Artist was won by Beck, Kanye West and Eminem the most times, with three wins. Three artists had two consecutive wins; Prince in 1995 and 1996, Beck in 1999 and 2000, and West in 2008 and 2009. Artists from the United States almost exclusively were nominated for and won the award, aside from one Australian win (Michael Hutchence in 1991), one Jamaican-American win (Shaggy in 2002) and four Canadian wins (Justin Bieber in 2016, two-time winner Drake in 2017 and 2019, and the Weeknd in 2021).

== Winners and nominees ==
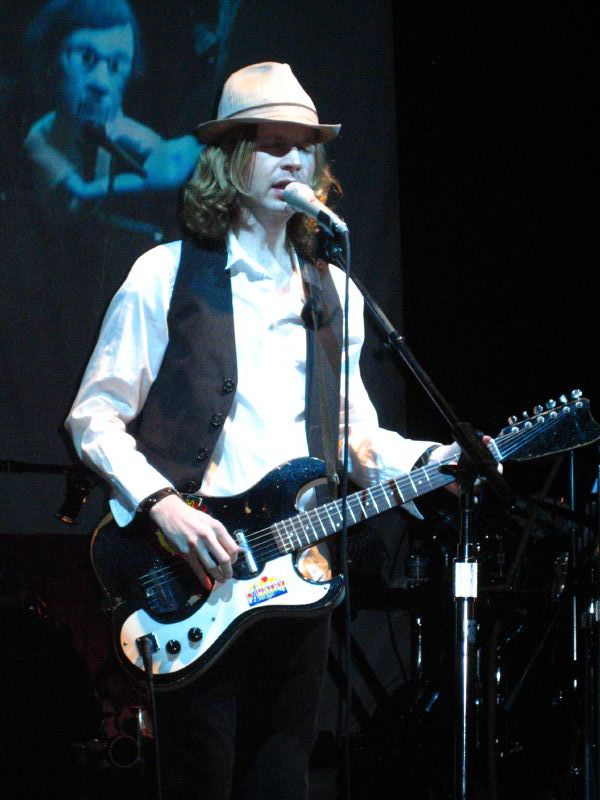
Three-time recipient Beck

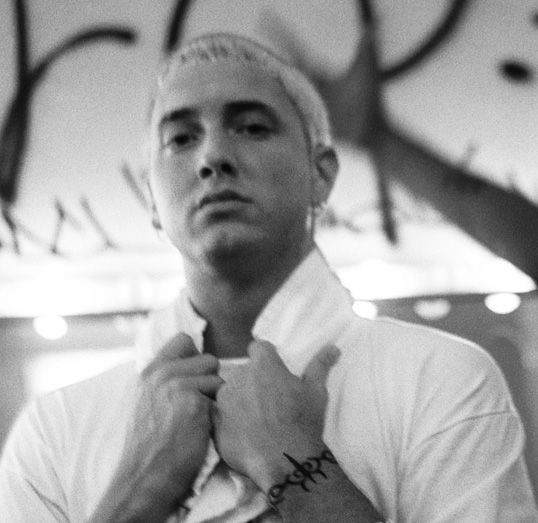
Three-time recipient Eminem

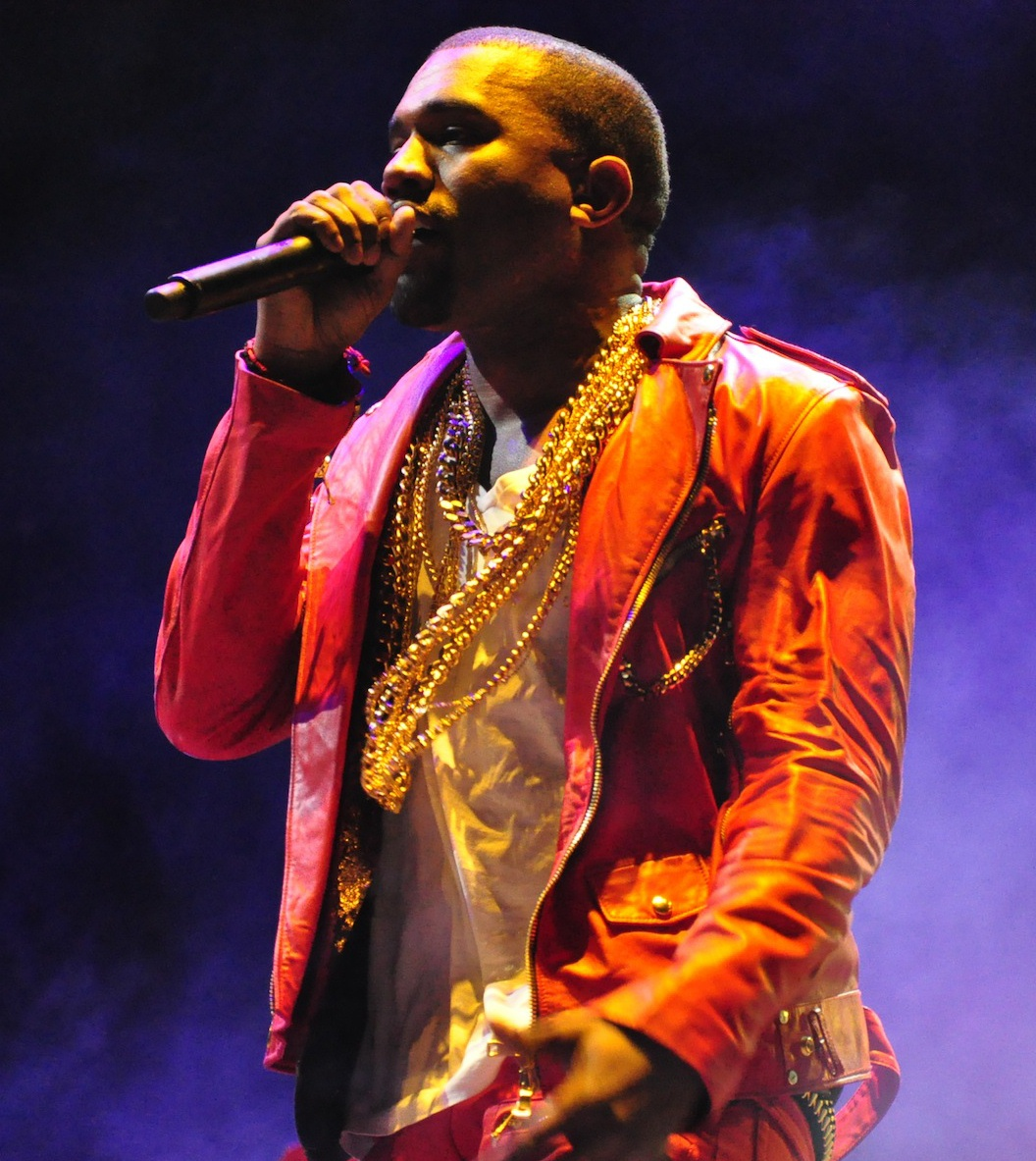
Three-time recipient Kanye West

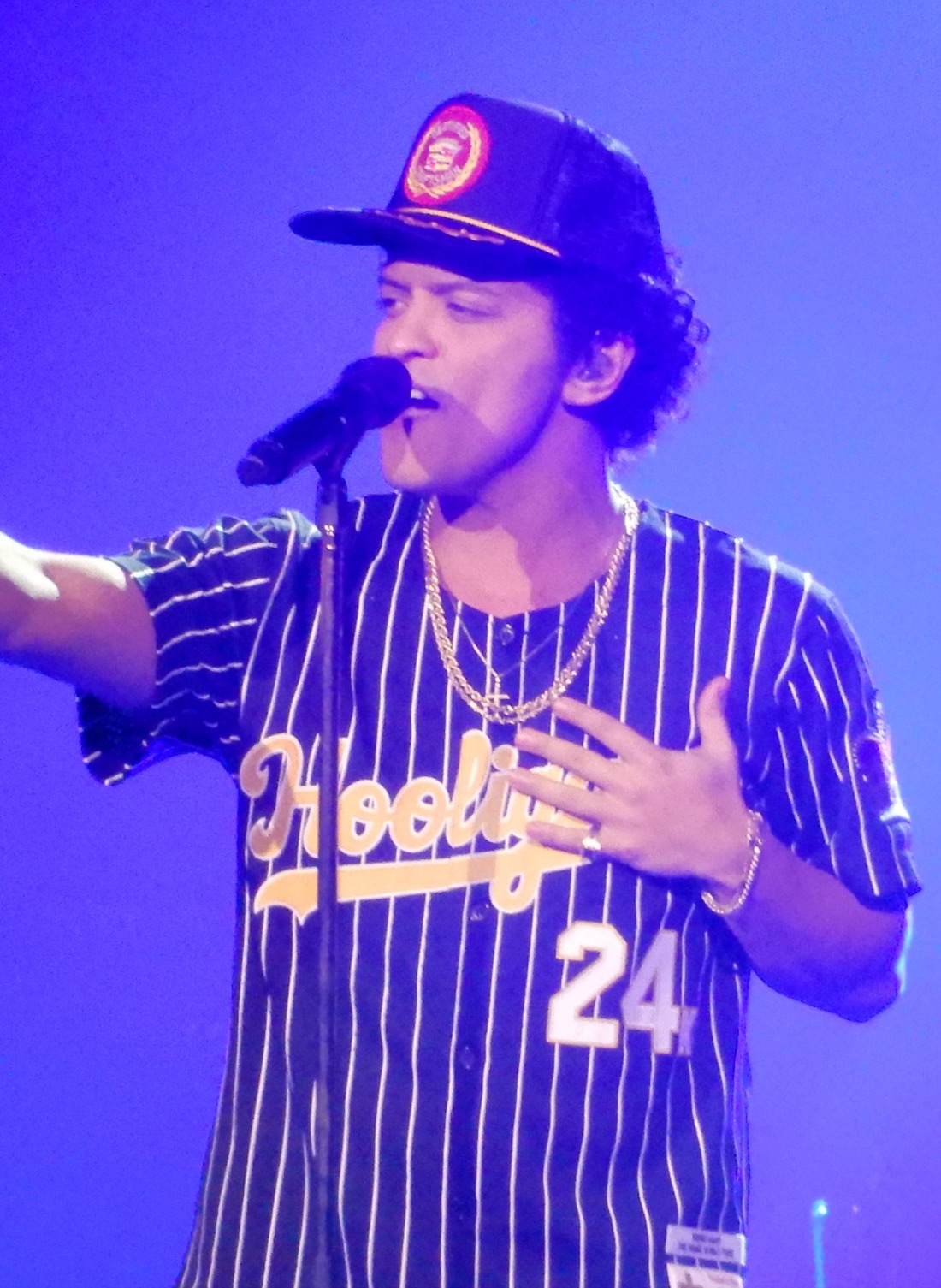
Two-time recipient Bruno Mars

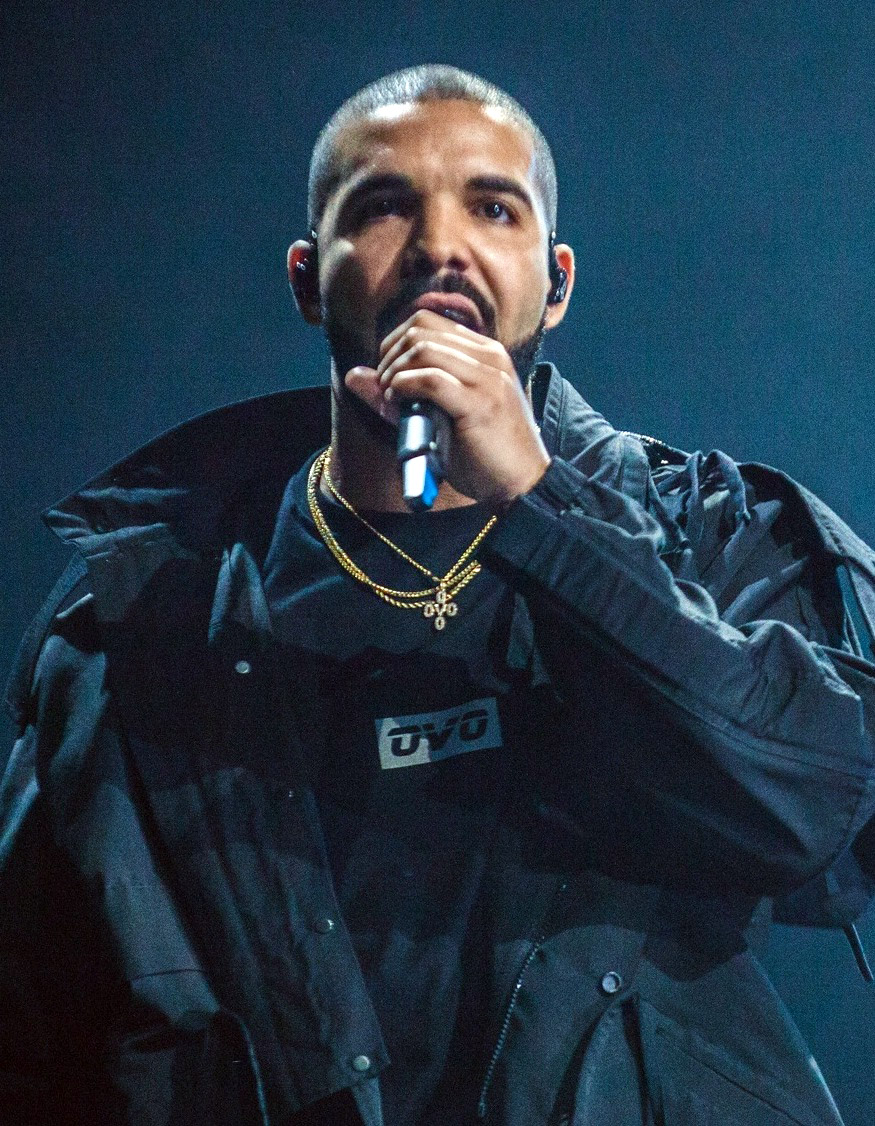
Two-time recipient Drake

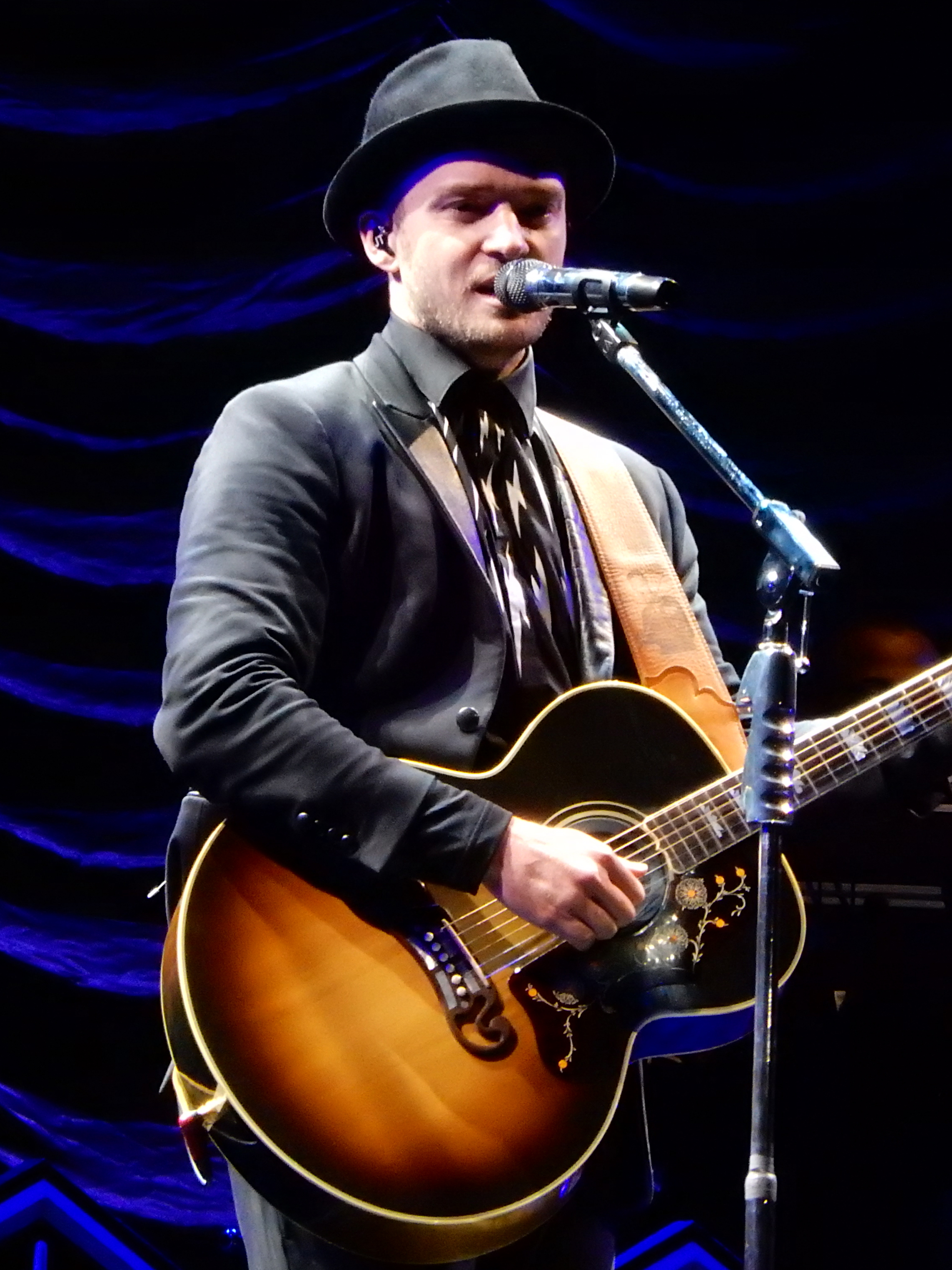
Two-time recipient Justin Timberlake

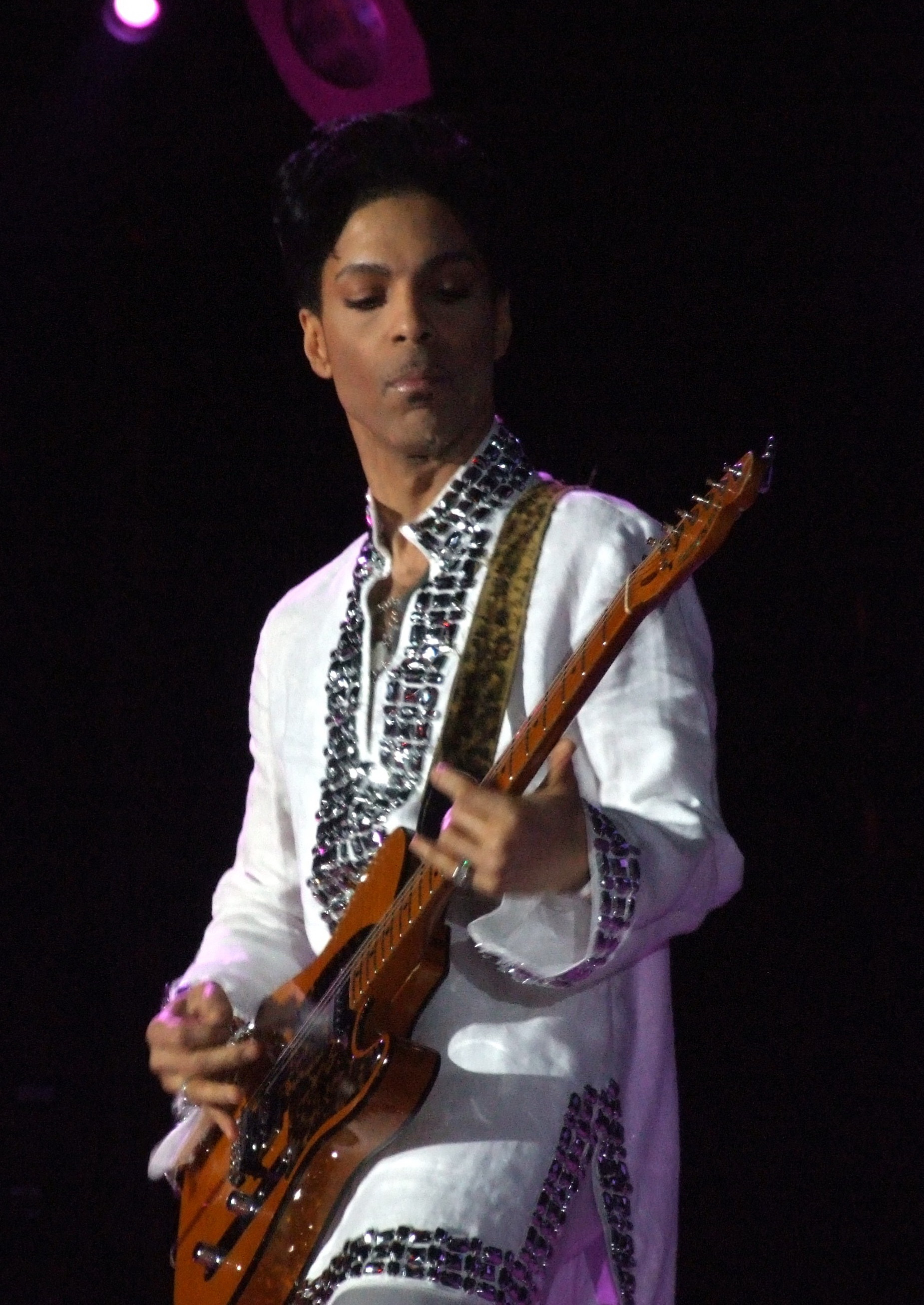
Two-time recipient Prince

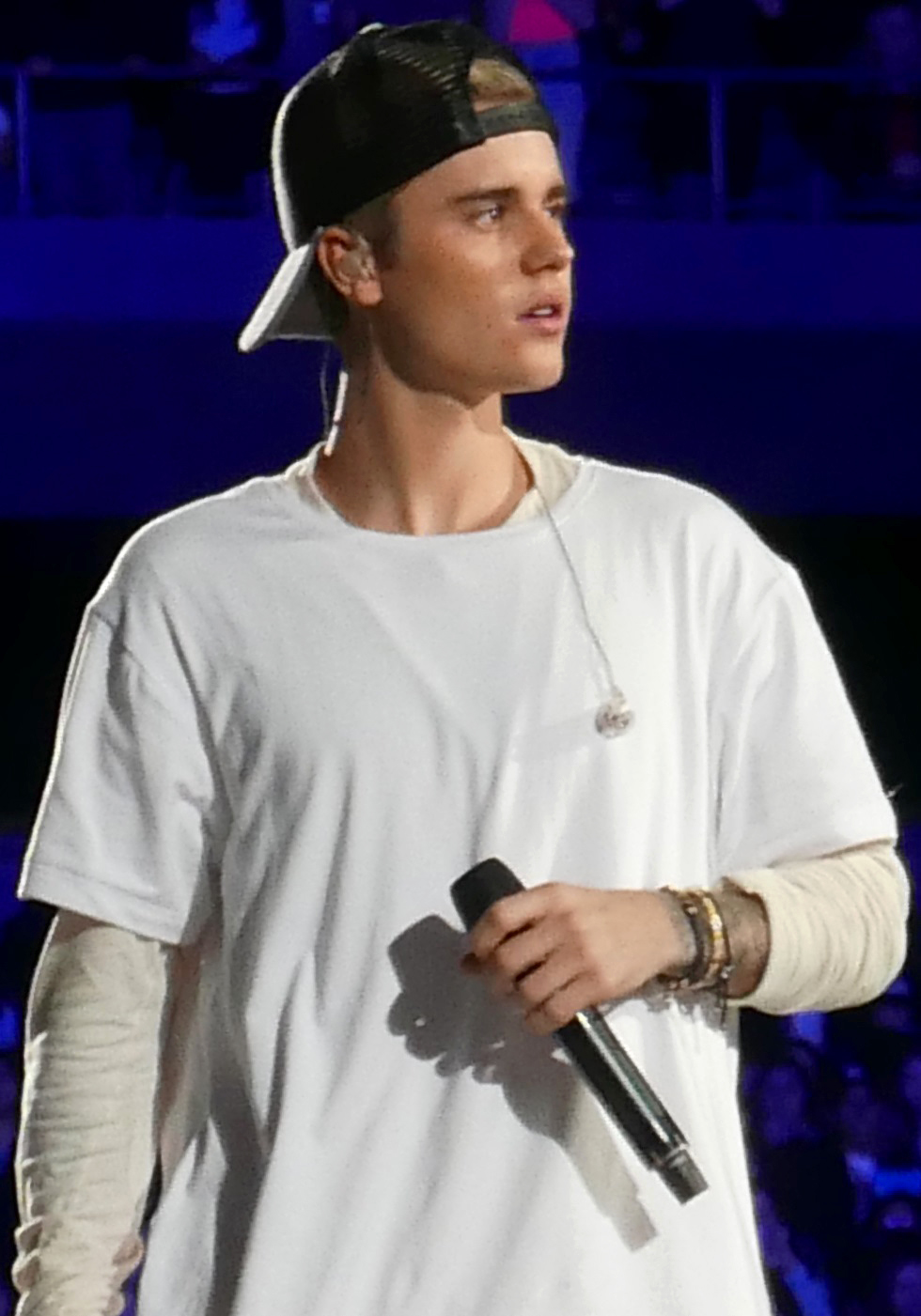
2016 winner Justin Bieber previously won the only Breakthrough award-winning international male solo artist

Year	Recipient	Nominee
1989	(United States) Michael Jackson	(United States) Terence Trent D'Arby; (United States) Alexander O'Neal; (United States) Prince; (United States) Luther Vandross
1990	Not Awarded	
1991	(Australia) Michael Hutchence	(United States) Jon Bon Jovi; (United States) MC Hammer; (United States) Prince; (United States) Paul Simon
1992	Not Awarded	
1993	Not Awarded	
1994	(United States) Lenny Kravitz	(United States) Terence Trent D'Arby; (United States) Billy Joel; (United States) Meat Loaf; (Canada) Neil Young
1995	(United States) Prince	(Canada) Bryan Adams; (Senegal) Youssou N'Dour; (United States) Luther Vandross; (United States) Warren G
1996	(United States) Prince	(United States) Coolio; (United States) Lenny Kravitz; (United States) Meat Loaf; (Canada) Neil Young
1997	(United States) Beck	(Canada) Bryan Adams; (United States) Babyface; (Italy) Robert Miles; (United States) Prince
1998	(United States) Jon Bon Jovi	(United States) Coolio; (United States) LL Cool J; (Germany) Sash!; (United States) DJ Shadow
1999	(United States) Beck	(Sweden) Eagle-Eye Cherry; (New Zealand) Neil Finn; (United States) Pras; (United States) Will Smith
2000	(United States) Beck	(United States) Eminem; (Puerto Rico) Ricky Martin; (United States) Moby; (United States) Will Smith
2001	(United States) Eminem	(Haiti) Wyclef Jean; (Republic of Ireland) Ronan Keating; (Puerto Rico) Ricky Martin; (United States) Sisqó
2002	(Jamaica) / (United States) Shaggy	(United States) Ryan Adams; (United States) Dr. Dre; (United States) Bob Dylan; (Haiti) Wyclef Jean
2003	(United States) Eminem	(United States) Beck; (United States) Moby; (United States) Nelly; (United States) Bruce Springsteen
2004	(United States) Justin Timberlake	(United States) 50 Cent; (United States) Beck; (Jamaica) Sean Paul; (Republic of Ireland) Damien Rice
2005	(United States) Eminem	(United States) Usher; (United States) Tom Waits; (United States) Kanye West; (United States) Brian Wilson
2006	(United States) Kanye West	(United States) Beck; (United States) Jack Johnson; (United States) John Legend; (United States) Bruce Springsteen
2007	(United States) Justin Timberlake	(United States) Beck; (United States) Bob Dylan; (United States) Jack Johnson; (Republic of Ireland) Damien Rice
2008	(United States) Kanye West	(Canada) Michael Bublé; (United States) Bruce Springsteen; (United States) Timbaland; (Canada) / (United States) Rufus Wainwright
2009	(United States) Kanye West	(United States) Beck; (United States) Neil Diamond; (United States) Jay-Z; (United States) Seasick Steve
2010	(United States) Jay-Z	(Canada) Michael Bublé; (United States) Eminem; (United States) Seasick Steve; (United States) Bruce Springsteen
2011	(United States) CeeLo Green	(United States) Eminem; (France) David Guetta; (United States) Bruce Springsteen; (United States) Kanye West
2012	(United States) Bruno Mars	(United States) Ryan Adams; (United States) Bon Iver; (United States) Aloe Blacc; (France) David Guetta
2013	(United States) Frank Ocean	(Canada) Michael Bublé; (Australia) Gotye; (United States) Bruce Springsteen; (United States) Jack White
2014	(United States) Bruno Mars	(Canada) Drake; (United States) Eminem; (United States) John Grant; (United States) Justin Timberlake
2015	(United States) Pharrell Williams	(United States) Beck; (Republic of Ireland) Hozier; (United States) John Legend; (United States) Jack White
2016	(Canada) Justin Bieber	(Canada) Drake; (United States) Father John Misty; (United States) Kendrick Lamar; (Canada) The Weeknd
2017	(Canada) Drake	(United States) Bon Iver; (Canada) Leonard Cohen (Posthumous); (United States) Bruno Mars; (Canada) The Weeknd
2018	(United States) Kendrick Lamar	(United States) Beck; (United States) Childish Gambino; (Canada) Drake; (United States) DJ Khaled
2019	(Canada) Drake	(United States) Eminem; (Canada) Shawn Mendes; (United States) Travis Scott; (United States) Kamasi Washington
2020	(United States) Tyler, the Creator	(Nigeria) Burna Boy; (Republic of Ireland) Dermot Kennedy; (United States) Post Malone; (United States) Bruce Springsteen
2021	(Canada) The Weeknd	(Nigeria) Burna Boy; (United States) Childish Gambino; (United States) Bruce Springsteen; (Australia) Tame Impala

== Multiple nominations and awards ==
Artists that received multiple nominations
Nominations	Artist
10	Beck
8	Eminem
7	Bruce Springsteen
5	Drake
5	Prince
5	Kanye West
3	Michael Bublé
3	Bruno Mars
3	Justin Timberlake
3	The Weeknd
2	Bryan Adams
2	Ryan Adams
2	Bon Iver
2	Jon Bon Jovi
2	Burna Boy
2	Childish Gambino
2	Coolio
2	Terence Trent D'Arby
2	Bob Dylan
2	David Guetta
2	Jay-Z
2	Wyclef Jean
2	Jack Johnson
2	Lenny Kravitz
2	Kendrick Lamar
2	John Legend
2	Ricky Martin
2	Meat Loaf
2	Moby
2	Damien Rice
2	Will Smith
2	Seasick Steve
2	Luther Vandross
2	Jack White
2	Neil Young

Artists that received multiple awards
Awards	Artist
3	Beck
3	Eminem
3	Kanye West
2	Drake
2	Bruno Mars
2	Prince
2	Justin Timberlake

== Countries by nominations ==
Country	Nominations	First nomination	Last nomination	Artist/s
United States (including Puerto Rico)	112	1989	2021	Majority of nominees
Canada	19	1994	2021	Neil Young, Bryan Adams, Michael Bublé, Rufus Wainwright, Drake, Justin Bieber, The Weeknd, Leonard Cohen, Shawn Mendes
Ireland	5	2001	2020	Ronan Keating, Damien Rice, Hozier, Dermot Kennedy
Australia	3	1991	2021	Michael Hutchence, Gotye, Tame Impala
France	2	2011	2012	David Guetta
Haiti	2	2001	2002	Wyclef Jean
Jamaica	2	2002	2004	Shaggy, Sean Paul
Nigeria	2	2020	2021	Burna Boy
Germany	1	1998		Sash!
Italy	1	1997		Robert Miles
New Zealand	1	1999		Neil Finn
Senegal	1	1995		Youssou N'Dour
Sweden	1	1999		Eagle-Eye Cherry

== Notes ==
- Michael Jackson (1984), Prince (1985) also won Brit Award for International Artist
- Michael Jackson (1988), Prince (1992–1993) also won Brit Award for International Solo Artist
- Justin Bieber (2011) also won Brit Award for International Breakthrough Act
