= Brit Award for Soundtrack/Cast Recording =

British music award

- Awarded for: Achievement in Excellent Soundtrack/Cast Recording
- Country: United Kingdom (UK)
- Presented by: British Phonographic Industry (BPI)
- First award: 1985 (Purple Rain)
- Final award: 2001
- Currently held by: American Beauty (2001)

Highlights
- Most awards: None
- Most nominations: None
- Website: www.brits.co.uk

The Brit Award for Soundtrack/Cast Recording is an award given by the British Phonographic Industry (BPI), an organisation which represents record companies and artists in the United Kingdom.

== Criteria ==
The accolade is presented at the Brit Awards, an annual celebration of British and international music. The winners and nominees are determined by the Brit Awards voting academy with over one-thousand members, which comprise record labels, publishers, managers, agents, media, and previous winners and nominees.

== History ==
The award was first presented in 1985 as Soundtrack/Cast Recording. The accolade was not handed out at the 1986 ceremony and has been defunct as of 2001.

| Year | Recipient | Nominee |
|---|---|---|
| 1985 | Purple Rain | Electric Dreams; Footloose; Give My Regards to Broad Street; The Woman in Red |
| 1986 | Not Awarded | |
| 1987 | Top Gun | Absolute Beginners; Down and Out in Beverly Hills; Out of Africa; A Room with a View |
| 1988 | The Phantom of the Opera | Dirty Dancing; Follies; La Bamba; Les Misérables |
| 1989 | Buster | Good Morning, Vietnam; Hairspray; The Princess Bride; Rattle and Hum |
| 1990 | Batman | Aspects of Love; Beaches; The Cook, the Thief, His Wife & Her Lover; Henry V |
| 1991 | Twin Peaks | Days of Thunder; Ghost; Pretty Woman; Wild at Heart |
| 1992 | The Commitments | The Doors; Five Guys Named Moe; Inspector Morse; Robin Hood: Prince of Thieves |
| 1993 | Wayne's World | Bugsy; Frankie and Johnny; Hook; Mo' Money |
| 1994 | The Bodyguard | The Jungle Book; Reservoir Dogs; Sleepless in Seattle; What's Love Got to Do with It |
| 1995 | Pulp Fiction | Forrest Gump; Four Weddings and a Funeral; The Lion King; Philadelphia |
| 1996 | Batman Forever | Braveheart; Muriel's Wedding; Natural Born Killers; Waiting to Exhale |
| 1997 | Trainspotting | Dangerous Minds; Evita; La Passione; Mission: Impossible |
| 1998 | The Full Monty | Men in Black; Romeo + Juliet; Space Jam; Trainspotting |
| 1999 | Titanic | Boogie Nights; Jackie Brown; Lock, Stock and Two Smoking Barrels; The Wedding Singer |
| 2000 | Notting Hill | Austin Powers: The Spy Who Shagged Me; Fight Club; The Matrix; Star Wars: Episode I – The Phantom Menace |
| 2001 | American Beauty | The Beach; Billy Elliot; Dancer in the Dark; Little Voice; Shaft; The Virgin Suicides |
