= Brit Awards 1987 =

British music awards ceremony

- Date: 9 February 1987
- Venue: Grosvenor House Hotel
- Hosted by: Jonathan King
- Most awards: Peter Gabriel (2)
- Most nominations: Peter Gabriel (4)

Television/radio coverage
- Network: BBC

Brit Awards 1987 was the seventh edition of the Brit Awards, an annual pop music awards ceremony in the United Kingdom. It was organised by the British Phonographic Industry and took place on 9 February 1987 at Grosvenor House Hotel in London.

The awards ceremony, hosted by Jonathan King, was televised by the BBC.

== Performances ==
- Chris de Burgh – "The Lady in Red"
- Curiosity Killed the Cat – "Down to Earth"
- Five Star – "Can't Wait Another Minute"
- Level 42 – "Lessons in Love"
- Simply Red – "Holding Back the Years"
- Spandau Ballet – "Through the Barricades"
- Whitney Houston – "How Will I Know"

== Winners and nominees ==
British Album of the Year	British Producer of the Year
Dire Straits – Brothers in Arms; Five Star – Silk & Steel; The Housemartins – London 0 Hull 4; Peter Gabriel – So; Simply Red – Picture Book	David A. Stewart; Hugh Padgham; Pip Williams; Stock Aitken Waterman; Trevor Horn
British Single of the Year	British Video of the Year
Pet Shop Boys – "West End Girls"; Chris de Burgh – "The Lady in Red"; The Communards and Sarah Jane Morris – "Don't Leave Me This Way"; Peter Gabriel – "Sledgehammer"; Simply Red – "Holding Back the Years"	Peter Gabriel – "Sledgehammer"
British Male Solo Artist	British Female Solo Artist
Peter Gabriel; Billy Ocean; Chris de Burgh; Phil Collins; Robert Palmer	Kate Bush; Jaki Graham; Joan Armatrading; Kim Wilde; Sade Adu
British Group	British Breakthrough Act
Five Star; Dire Straits; Eurythmics; Pet Shop Boys; Simply Red	The Housemartins
International Group	International Solo Artist
The Bangles; A-ha; Bon Jovi; Cameo; Huey Lewis and the News	Paul Simon; Anita Baker; Bruce Springsteen; Madonna; Whitney Houston
Classical Recording	Soundtrack/Cast Recording
Julian Lloyd Webber; André Previn; Luciano Pavarotti; Mariss Jansons; Nigel Kennedy	Top Gun; Absolute Beginners; Down and Out in Beverly Hills; Out of Africa; A Room with a View

=== Outstanding Contribution to Music ===
- Eric Clapton

== Multiple nominations and awards ==
The following artists received multiple awards and/or nominations.

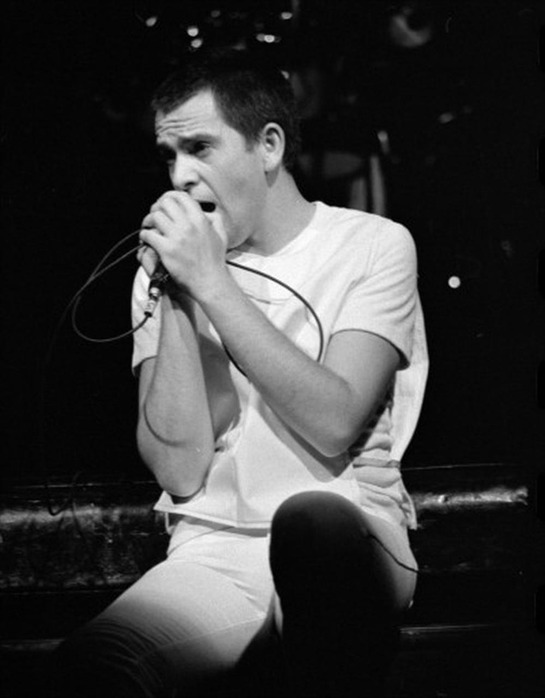
Two-time winner Peter Gabriel as most nominations and awards

Artists that received multiple nominations
Nominations	Artist
4	Peter Gabriel
3	Simply Red
2	Chris de Burgh
2	Dire Straits
2	Five Star
2	The Housemartins
2	Pet Shop Boys

Artists that received multiple awards
Awards	Artist
2	Peter Gabriel
