= Brit Awards 1988 =

British music awards ceremony

- Date: 8 February 1988
- Venue: Royal Albert Hall
- Hosted by: Noel Edmonds
- Most awards: Alison Moyet, George Michael, Michael Jackson, New Order, Pet Shop Boys, Rick Astley, Sting, Stock Aitken Waterman, Terence Trent D'Arby, U2, Vernon Handley, Wet Wet Wet and the Who (Once)
- Most nominations: Pet Shop Boys, Rick Astley and T'Pau (3)

Television/radio coverage
- Network: BBC

Brit Awards 1988 was the eighth edition of the Brit Awards, an annual pop music awards ceremony in the United Kingdom. It was organised by the British Phonographic Industry and took place on 8 February 1988 at Royal Albert Hall in London. This year marked the first presentation of the now-defunct International Breakthrough Act award.

The awards ceremony, hosted by Noel Edmonds, was televised by the BBC.

== Performances ==
- Bananarama – "Love in the First Degree"
- Bee Gees – "You Win Again"
- Chris Rea – "Let's Dance"
- Pet Shop Boys with Dusty Springfield – "What Have I Done to Deserve This?"
- Rick Astley – "Never Gonna Give You Up"
- Terence Trent D'Arby – "Wishing Well"
- T'Pau – "China in Your Hand"
- The Who – "My Generation" / "Who Are You"/ "Substitute"

== Winners and nominees ==
British Album of the Year	British Producer of the Year
Sting – ...Nothing Like the Sun; George Michael – Faith; Pet Shop Boys – Actually; Swing Out Sister – It's Better to Travel; T'Pau – Bridge of Spies	Stock Aitken Waterman; Alan Tarney; Brian Eno; Julian Mendelsohn; Paul Staveley O'Duffy
British Single of the Year	British Video of the Year
Rick Astley – "Never Gonna Give You Up"; Bananarama – "Love in the First Degree"; MARRS – "Pump Up the Volume"; Pet Shop Boys – "It's a Sin"; T'Pau – "China in Your Hand"	New Order – "True Faith"
British Male Solo Artist	British Female Solo Artist
George Michael; Chris Rea; Cliff Richard; Rick Astley; Steve Winwood	Alison Moyet; Kate Bush; Kim Wilde; Samantha Fox; Sinitta
British Group	British Breakthrough Act
Pet Shop Boys; Bee Gees; Def Leppard; Level 42; Whitesnake	Wet Wet Wet; Rick Astley; The Christians; Johnny Hates Jazz; T'Pau Eliminated; Black; Curiosity Killed the Cat; Living in a Box; Mel and Kim; Pepsi & Shirlie; The Proclaimers; Swing Out Sister
Outstanding Contribution to Music	International Solo Artist
The Who	Michael Jackson; Luther Vandross; Madonna; Prince; Whitney Houston
International Group	International Breakthrough Act
U2; Bon Jovi; Fleetwood Mac; Heart; Los Lobos	Terence Trent D'Arby; Beastie Boys; Bruce Willis; LL Cool J; Los Lobos
Classical Recording	Soundtrack/Cast Recording
Vernon Handley; Andrew Davis; Bryden Thomson; Roger Norrington; Simon Rattle	The Phantom of the Opera; Dirty Dancing; Follies; La Bamba; Les Miserables

== Multiple nominations and awards ==
The following artists received multiple awards and/or nominations.

Artists with the most nominations

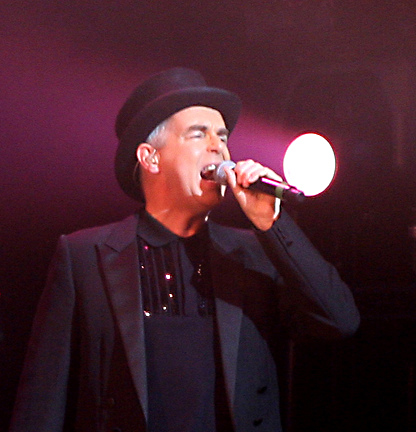
Pet Shop Boys (3)

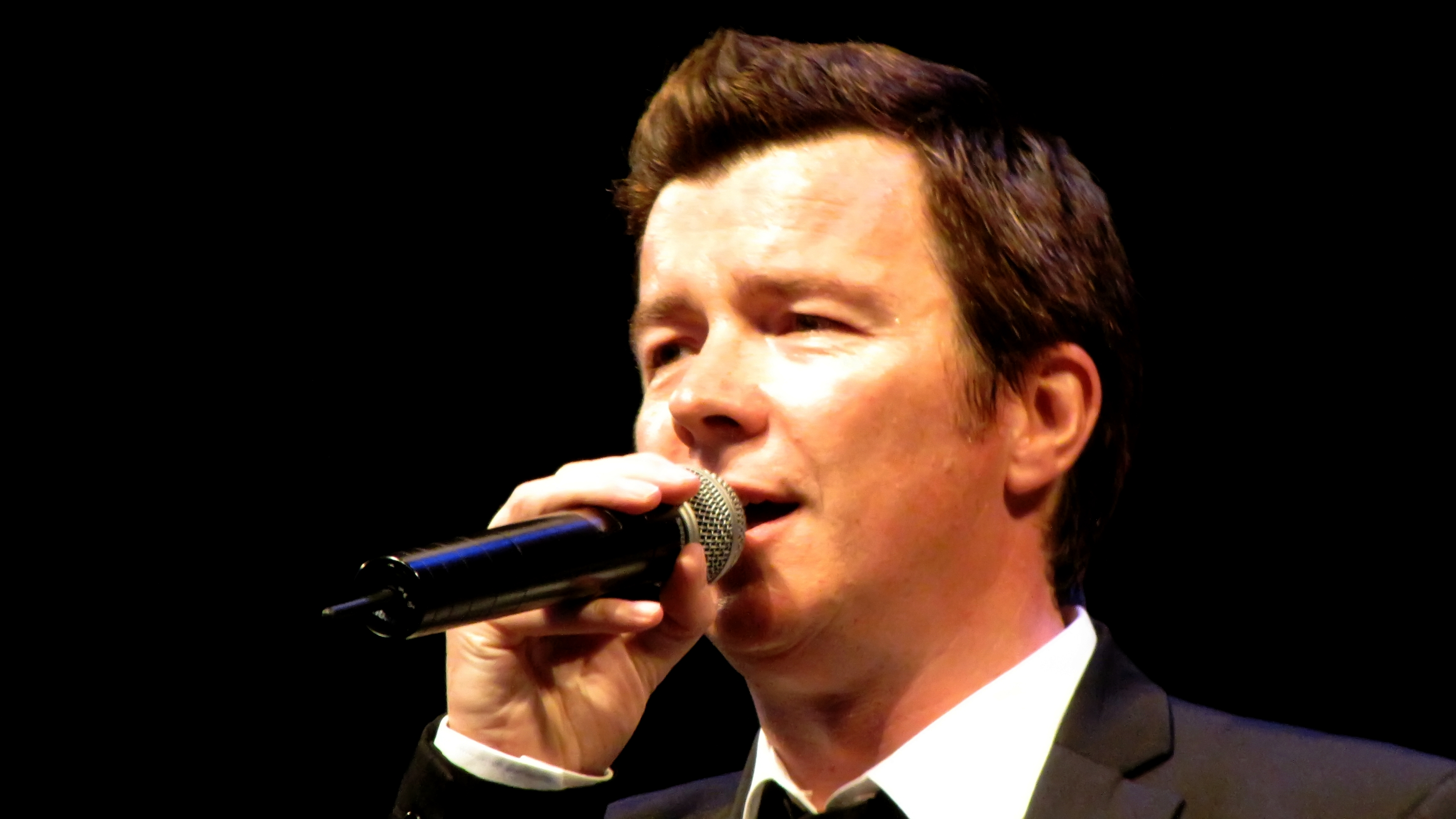
Rick Astley (3)

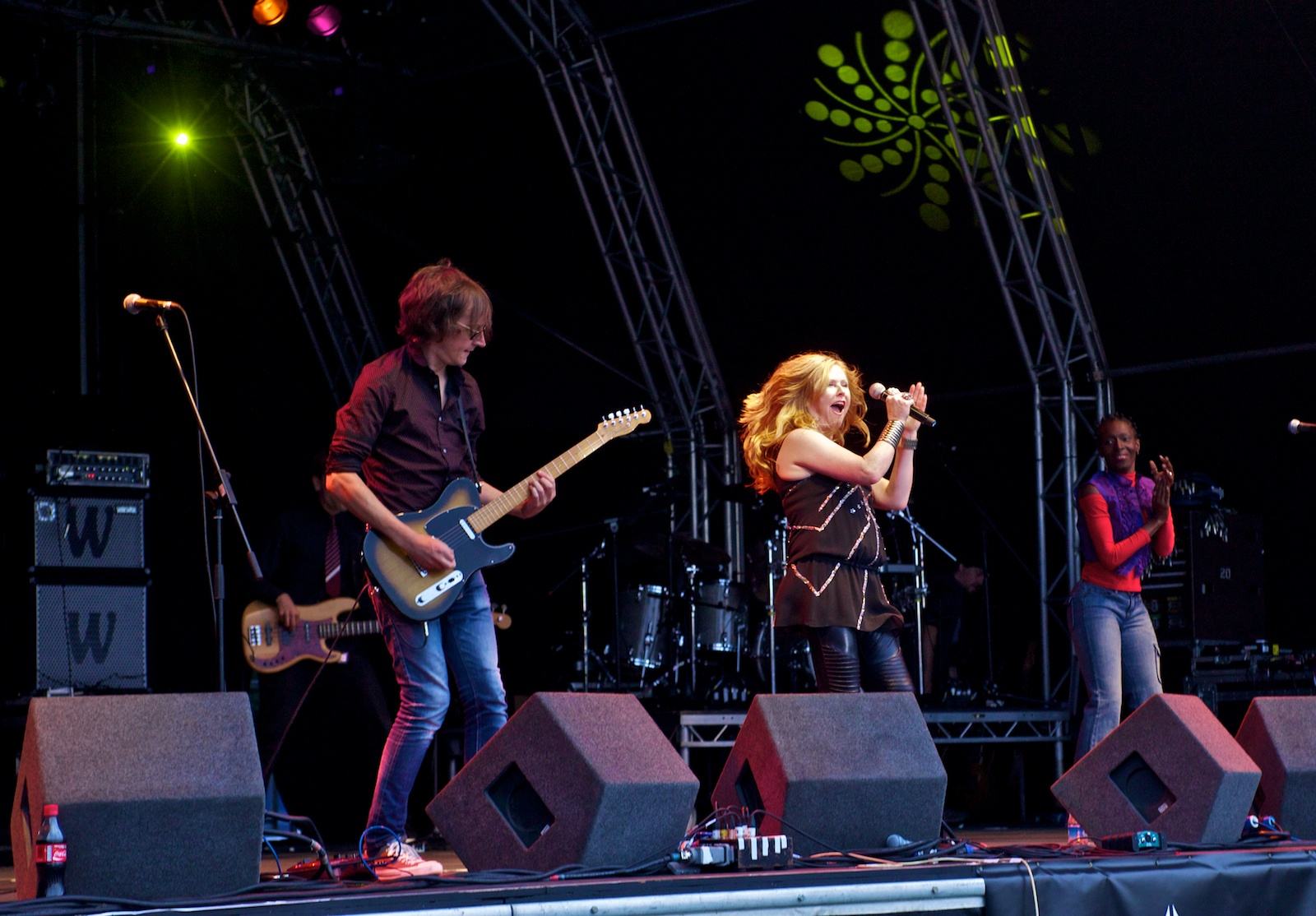
T'Pau (3)

Artists that received multiple nominations
Nominations	Artist
3	Pet Shop Boys
3	Rick Astley
3	T'Pau
2	George Michael
2	Los Lobos
