= Brit Award for Classical Recording =

British music award

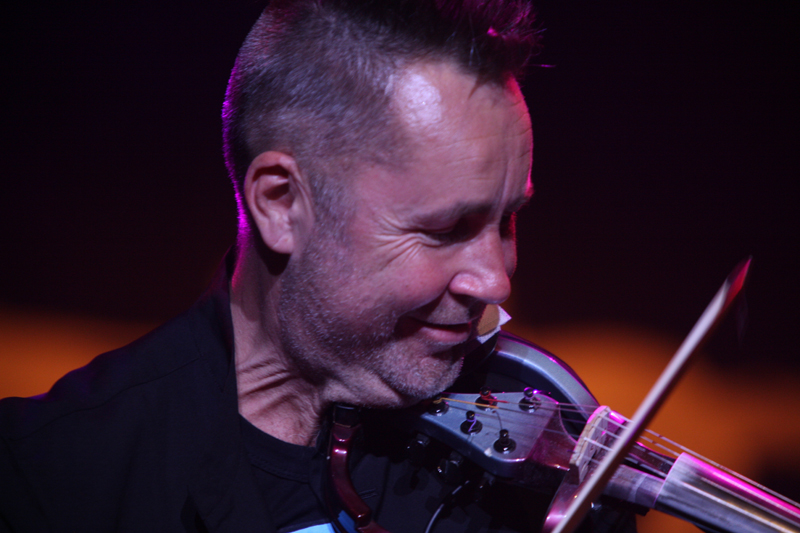
- 1993 Winner Nigel Kennedy
- Awarded for: Achievement in Excellent Classical Recording
- Country: United Kingdom (UK)
- Presented by: British Phonographic Industry (BPI)
- First award: 1982
- Final award: 1993
- Currently held by: Nigel Kennedy (1993)

Highlights
- Most awards: Nigel Kennedy and Simon Rattle (2 each)
- Most nominations: Simon Rattle (6)
- Website: www.brits.co.uk

The Brit Award for Classical Recording was an award given by the British Phonographic Industry (BPI), an organisation which represents record companies and artists in the United Kingdom.

== Criteria ==
The accolade used to be presented at the Brit Awards, an annual celebration of British and international music. The winners and nominees are determined by the Brit Awards voting academy with over one-thousand members, which comprise record labels, publishers, managers, agents, media, and previous winners and nominees.

== History ==
The award was first presented in 1982 as "Classical Recording" which was won by Simon Rattle. The accolade has been defunct as of 1993.

New Zealand opera singer Kiri Te Kanawa became the only female winner in 1984. Only two other women were nominated for the award; Jane Glover for her recording of Violin Concerto by Richard Strauss and another violin concerto by Christopher Headington in 1992, and Cecilia Bartoli for her recording of Heroines by Giacomo Puccini in 1993. Te Kanawa was also one of only four non-British winners, along with Australian guitarist John Williams in 1983, Indian conductor Zubin Mehta for Carreras Domingo Pavarotti in Concert in 1991 and Hungarian-born conductor Georg Solti for his recording of Otello by Giuseppe Verdi in 1992, though Solti had been a British citizen since 1972. At least two musicians were nominated posthumously; Puccini in 1984, 60 years after his death, and Leonard Bernstein for his operetta Candide in 1992, two years after his death. The only musician nominated for two recordings in the same year was Colin Davis, who was nominated for his recordings of The Magic Flute by Wolfgang Amadeus Mozart and The Turn of the Screw by Benjamin Britten in 1985.

== Winners and nominees ==
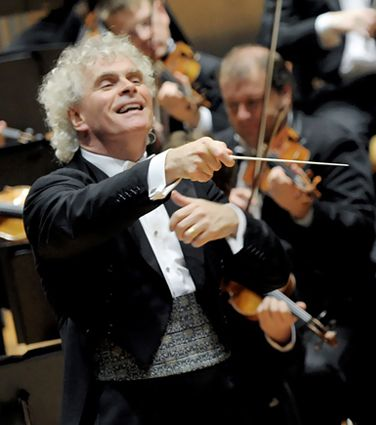
Inaugural 1982 winner Simon Rattle

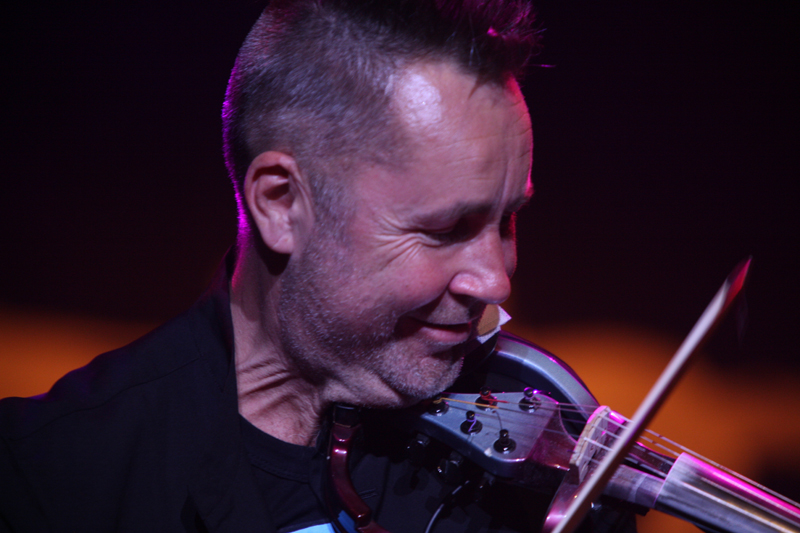
Two-time winner Nigel Kennedy

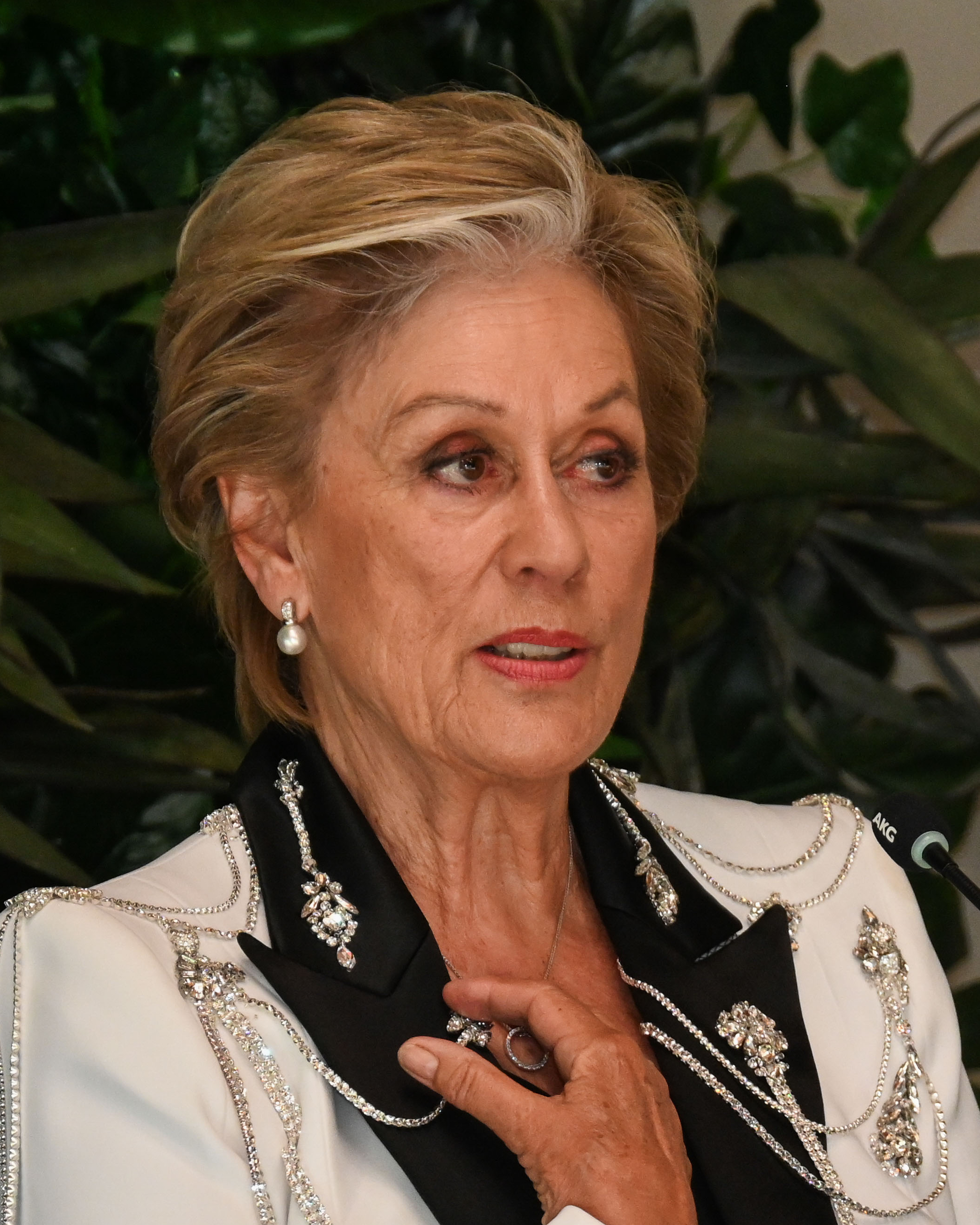
Kiri Te Kanawa was the only woman to win the award and one of only three female nominees overall

Year	Recipient	Nominees
1982	(England) Simon Rattle	(United States) James Levine; (England) Vernon Handley
1983	(Australia) John Williams	(England) Christopher Hogwood; (Spain) Joaquín Rodrigo; (England) Julian Lloyd Webber; (England) Neville Marriner; (England) Simon Rattle
1984	(New Zealand) Kiri Te Kanawa	(Italy) Giacomo Puccini (posthumously); (England) Michael Tippett; (England) Simon Rattle; (England) Trevor Pinnock
1985	(England) Christopher Hogwood – The Four Seasons (Vivaldi)	(Scotland) Bryden Thomson – Symphony No. 4 (Arnold Bax); (Italy) Carlo Maria Giulini – Il trovatore (Verdi); (England) Colin Davis – The Magic Flute (Mozart); (England) Colin Davis – The Turn of the Screw (Benjamin Britten)
1986	(England) Nigel Kennedy-Violin Concerto (Elgar)	(Hungary) / (United Kingdom) Georg Solti-Messiah (Handel); (England) John Rutter-Requiem (Fauré); (England) Julian Lloyd Webber-Cello Concerto No. 1 (Haydn); (England) Trevor Pinnock-Canon & Gigue (Pachelbel)
1987	(England) Julian Lloyd Webber - Elgar Cello Concerto	(Germany) / (United States) André Previn; (Italy) Luciano Pavarotti; (Latvia) Mariss Jansons; (England) Nigel Kennedy
1988	(England) Vernon Handley-Symphony No. 5 (Ralph Vaughan Williams)	(England) Andrew Davis-The Mask of Time (Michael Tippett); (Scotland) Bryden Thomson-Piano Concertos 1 & 2 (Hummel); (England) Roger Norrington-Symphony No. 2 & 8 (Beethoven); (England) Simon Rattle-Symphony No. 2 (Mahler)
1989	(England) Trevor Pinnock-Messiah (Handel)	(Germany) / (United States) André Previn-Violin & Viola Concertos (Walton); (England) Jeffrey Tate-Opera Arias (Mozart); (United States) Philip Brunelle-Paul Bunyan (Britten); (England) Simon Rattle-Symphony No. 2 (Mahler)
1990	(England) Simon Rattle-Porgy and Bess (George Gershwin)	(England) Jeffrey Tate-Piano Concertos (Mozart); (England) John Eliot Gardiner-St Matthew Passion (Bach); (England) Nigel Kennedy-The Four Seasons (Vivaldi); (Italy) Riccardo Chailly-Façade/Renard (William Walton/Igor Stravinsky)
1991	(India) Zubin Mehta-Carreras Domingo Pavarotti in Concert (various)	(England) John Eliot Gardiner-Vespro della Beata Vergine (Claudio Monteverdi; (United States) Kent Nagano-The Love of Three Oranges (Sergei Prokofiev); (England) Matthew Best-Serenade to Music/Five Mystical Songs/Fantasia on Christmas Carols (Vaughan Williams); (Scotland) Oliver Knussen-The Prince of the Pagodas (Britten)
1992	(Hungary) / (United Kingdom) Georg Solti-Otello (Verdi)	(United Kingdom) Jane Glover-Violin Concerto (Richard Strauss)/Violin Concerto (Christopher Headington); (England) John Eliot Gardiner-Missa Solemnis (Beethoven); (United States) Leonard Bernstein-Candide (self, posthumously); (Finland) Osmo Vänskä-Violin Concerto (Jean Sibelius)
1993	(England) Nigel Kennedy-Violin Concerto (Beethoven)	(Italy) Cecilia Bartoli-Heroines (Puccini); (Poland) Henryk Górecki-Symphony No. 3 (self); (England) John Tavener-The Protecting Veil (self); (Austria) Nikolaus Harnoncourt-Symphony No. 9 (Beethoven)

== Multiple nominations and awards ==
Artists that received multiple nominations
Nominations	Artist
6	Simon Rattle
4	Nigel Kennedy
3	John Eliot Gardiner
3	Julian Lloyd Webber
3	Trevor Pinnock
2	André Previn
2	Bryden Thomson
2	Christopher Hogwood
2	Colin Davis
2	Georg Solti
2	Jeffrey Tate
2	Vernon Handley

Artists that received multiple awards
Awards	Artist
2	Nigel Kennedy
2	Simon Rattle

== Nominations by country ==
Country	Nominations	First nomination	Last nomination	Artist/s
United Kingdom	40	1982	1993	Simon Rattle, Vernon Handley, Christopher Hogwood, Julian Lloyd Webber, Neville Marriner, Michael Tippett, Trevor Pinnock, Bryden Thomson, Colin Davis, Nigel Kennedy, Georg Solti, John Rutter, Andrew Davis, Roger Norrington, Jeffrey Tate, John Eliot Gardiner, Matthew Best, Oliver Knussen, Jane Glover, John Tavener
United States	6	1982	1992	James Levine, André Previn, Philip Brunelle, Kent Nagano, Leonard Bernstein
Italy	5	1984	1993	Giacomo Puccini, Carlo Maria Giulini, Luciano Pavarotti, Riccardo Chailly, Cecilia Bartoli
Germany	2	1987	1989	André Previn
Hungary	2	1986	1992	Georg Solti
Australia	1	1983		John Williams
Austria	1	1993		Nikolaus Harnoncourt
Finland	1	1992		Osmo Vänskä
India	1	1991		Zubin Mehta
Latvia	1	1987		Mariss Jansons
New Zealand	1	1984		Kiri Te Kanawa
Poland	1	1993		Henryk Górecki
Spain	1	1983		Joaquín Rodrigo
