= Brit Award for International Artist =

British music award

Brit Award for International Artist of the Year
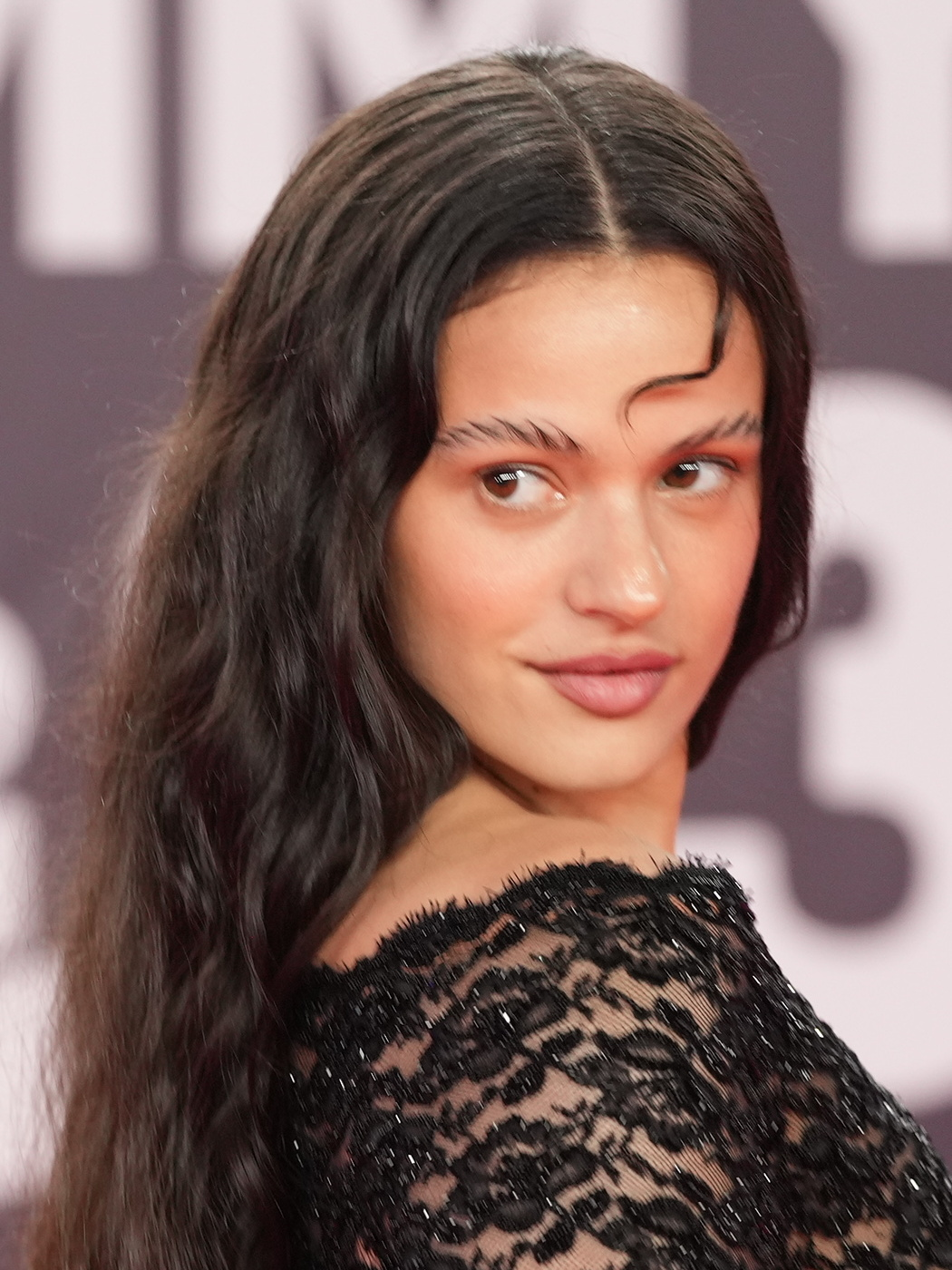
- 2026 winner: Rosalía
- Awarded for: Achievement in Excellent International Artist
- Country: United Kingdom (UK)
- Presented by: British Phonographic Industry (BPI)
- First award: 1983
- Currently held by: Rosalía (2026)

Highlights
- Most awards: Prince (3)
- Most nominations: Madonna, Prince, Taylor Swift (5)
- Website: www.brits.co.uk

The Brit Award for International Artist of the Year is an award given by the British Phonographic Industry (BPI), an organisation which represents record companies and artists in the United Kingdom. The accolade is presented at the Brit Awards, an annual celebration of British and international music. The winners and nominees are determined by the Brit Awards voting academy with over one-thousand members, which comprise record labels, publishers, managers, agents, media, and previous winners and nominees.

First presented at the 3rd Brit Awards in 1983 to Kid Creole and the Coconuts, the award has been presented with various names over its tenure. Including his win with The Revolution, Prince has the most wins in this category, with three (two of which were consecutive), while Madonna has the most nominations without a win, with five. Michael Jackson is the only other artist with multiple wins in this category. In 2023 Beyoncé became the first artist to win in two categories for international acts at the same award ceremony, winning for International Artist and International Song with "Break My Soul".

Only eleven non-American artists have been nominated for the award; Spanish singer Julio Iglesias in 1983, Australian band Men at Work in 1984, Swedish singer Neneh Cherry in 1990, Canadian musician Bryan Adams in 1992, Irish singer Enya in 1992 and 1993, Canadian singer k.d. lang in 1993, Nigerian singers Burna Boy in 2023 and 2024 and Asake in 2024 and 2025, Irish singer CMAT in 2024 and 2026, Australian singer Kylie Minogue in 2024 and Spanish singer Rosalía in 2026; Cherry and Rosalía are the only non-American winners. As of 2026, the current holder of the award is Rosalía.

== History ==
The award was first presented in 1983 as International Artist, where both groups and solo artists of any gender could be nominated. From 1986 to 1988, in 1990 and again in 1992 and 1993, it was presented as International Solo Artist (given to a male or female artist) while groups were honored with the newly created Brit Award for International Group from 1986 onward. The accolade was not handed out at the 1989 and 1991 ceremonies and has been defunct as of 1993.

In 2021, it was announced that the category had been revived and returned to its original name Best International Artist of the Year following the removal of gendered categories, and combines the International Male Solo Artist and International Female Solo Artist categories. This new iteration of the award was first presented at the 42nd Brit Awards. The number of nominees in the category was increased from five to ten in 2024.

== Winners and nominees ==
=== International Artist (1983-1985) ===
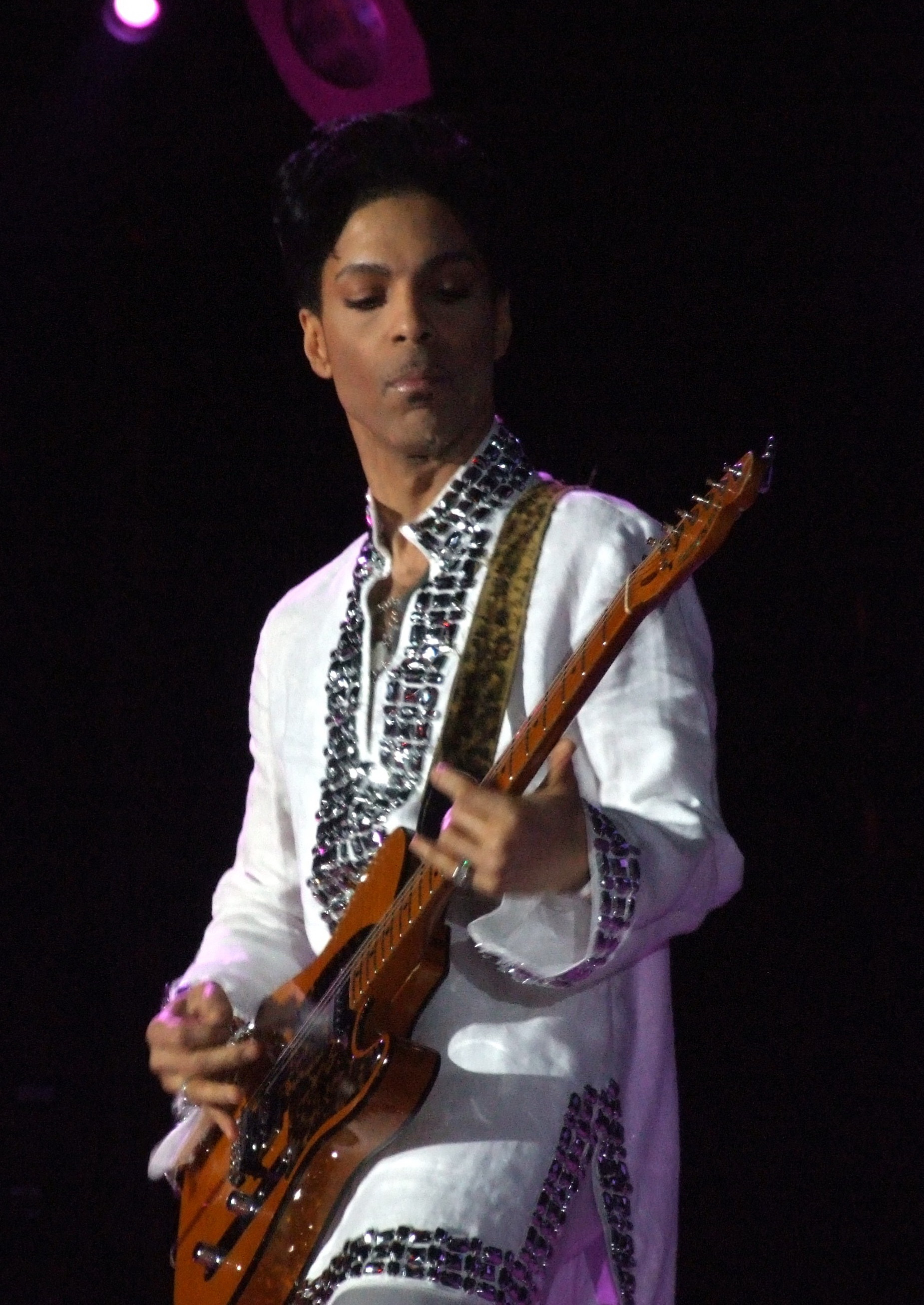
Three-time winner Prince

Year	Recipient	Nominee
1983 (3rd)	(United States) Kid Creole and the Coconuts	(Spain) Julio Iglesias; (United States) Barry Manilow
1984 (4th)	(United States) Michael Jackson	(United States) Hall & Oates; (United States) Billy Joel; (Australia) Men at Work; (United States) Lionel Richie
1985 (5th)	(United States) Prince & The Revolution	(United States) Michael Jackson; (United States) Lionel Richie; (United States) Bruce Springsteen; (United States) ZZ Top

=== International Solo Artist (1986-1988, 1990, 1992-1993) ===
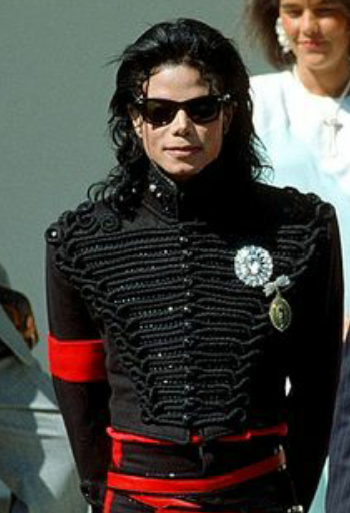
Two-time winner Michael Jackson

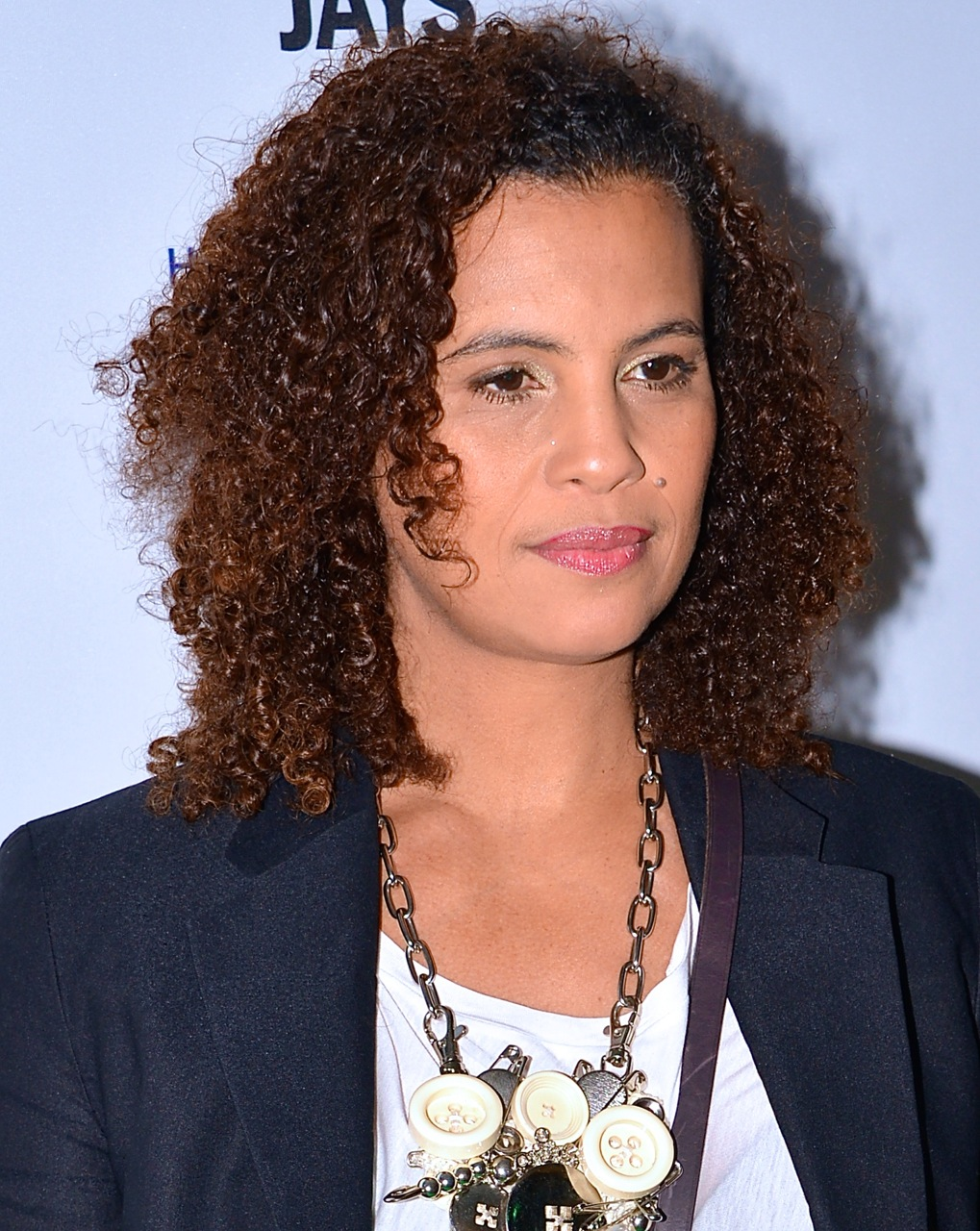
Neneh Cherry became the first female recipient in 1990, and remained the only non-American winner until Rosalía's win in 2026

Year	Recipient	Nominee
1986 (6th)	(United States) Bruce Springsteen	(United States) Madonna; (United States) Lionel Richie; (United States) Tina Turner; (United States) Stevie Wonder
1987 (7th)	(United States) Paul Simon	(United States) Anita Baker; (United States) Whitney Houston; (United States) Madonna; (United States) Bruce Springsteen
1988 (8th)	(United States) Michael Jackson	(United States) Whitney Houston; (United States) Madonna; (United States) Prince; (United States) Luther Vandross
1990 (10th)	(Sweden) Neneh Cherry	(United States) Bobby Brown; (Cuba) Gloria Estefan; (United States) Prince; (United States) Tina Turner
1992 (12th)	(United States) Prince	(Canada) Bryan Adams; (United States) Michael Bolton; (Republic of Ireland) Enya; (United States) Madonna
1993 (13th)	(United States) Prince	(United States) Tori Amos; (Republic of Ireland) Enya; (Canada) k.d. lang; (United States) Madonna; (United States) Curtis Stigers

=== International Artist (2022-present) ===
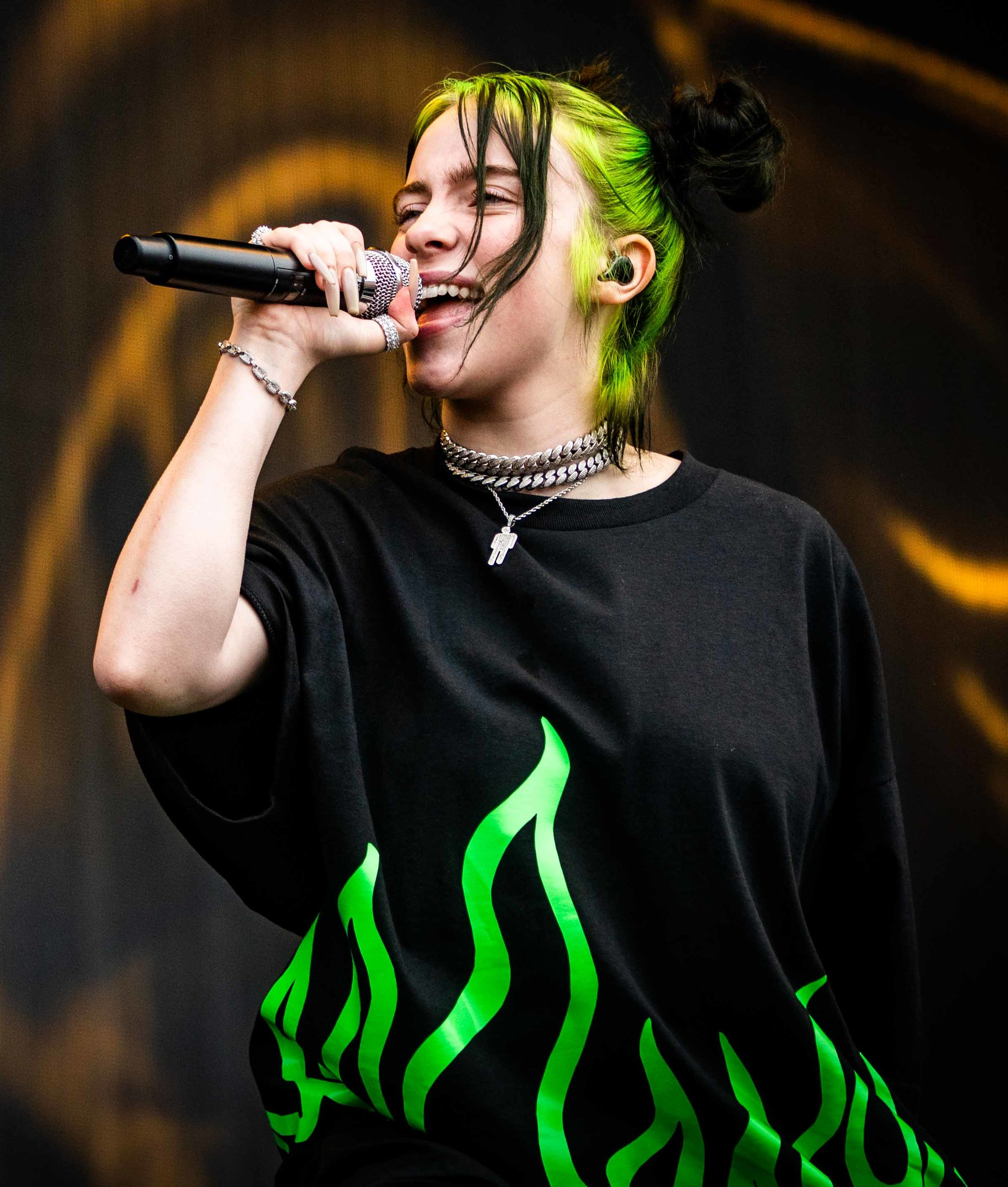
Billie Eilish, the winner of the newly-revived category in 2022

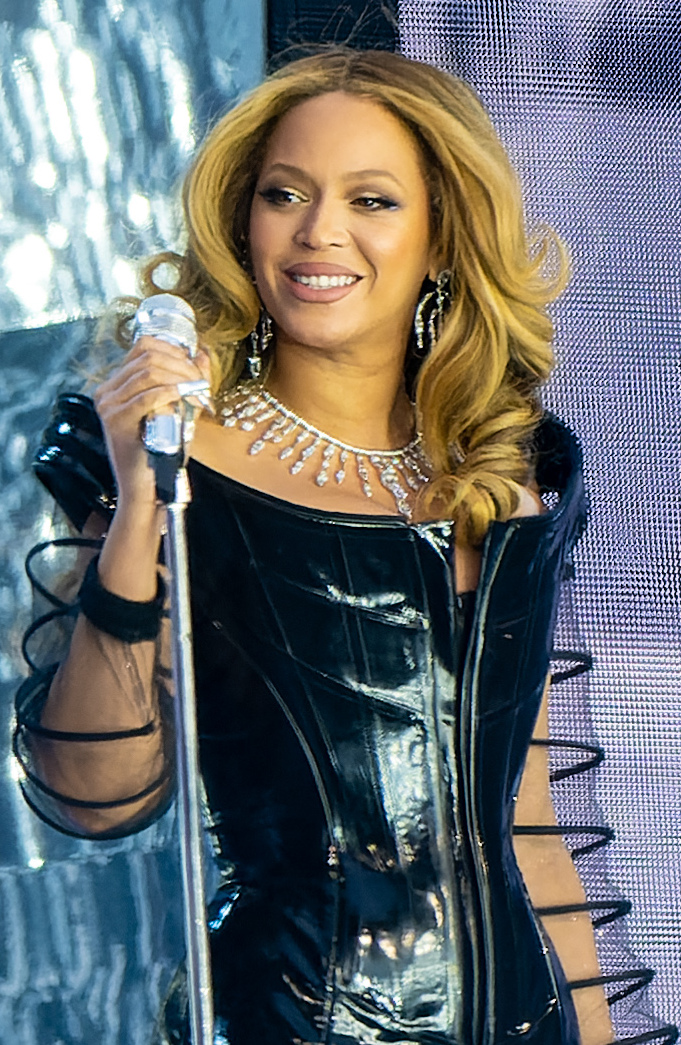
Beyoncé won both International Artist and International Song at the 2023 ceremony

Year	Recipient	Nominee
2022 (42nd)	(United States) Billie Eilish	(United States) Doja Cat; (United States) Lil Nas X; (United States) Olivia Rodrigo; (United States) Taylor Swift
2023 (43rd)	(United States) Beyoncé	(Nigeria) Burna Boy; (United States) Kendrick Lamar; (United States) Lizzo; (United States) Taylor Swift
2024 (44th)	(United States) SZA	(Nigeria) Asake; (Nigeria) Burna Boy; (United States) Caroline Polachek; (Republic of Ireland) CMAT; (Australia) Kylie Minogue; (United States) Lana Del Rey; (United States) Miley Cyrus; (United States) Olivia Rodrigo; (United States) Taylor Swift
2025 (45th)	(United States) Chappell Roan	(United States) Adrianne Lenker; (Nigeria) Asake; (United States) Benson Boone; (United States) Beyoncé; (United States) Billie Eilish; (United States) Kendrick Lamar; (United States) Sabrina Carpenter; (United States) Taylor Swift; (United States) Tyler, the Creator
2026 (46th)	(Spain) Rosalía	(Puerto Rico) Bad Bunny; (United States) Chappell Roan; (Republic of Ireland) CMAT; (United States) Doechii; (United States) Lady Gaga; (United States) Sabrina Carpenter; (United States) Sombr; (United States) Taylor Swift; (United States) Tyler, the Creator

== Multiple nominations and awards ==
Artists that received multiple nominations
Awards	Artist
5	Madonna; Prince; Taylor Swift
3	Michael Jackson; Lionel Richie; Bruce Springsteen
2	Asake; Beyoncé; Billie Eilish; Burna Boy; Chappell Roan; CMAT; Enya; Kendrick Lamar; Whitney Houston; Olivia Rodrigo; Sabrina Carpenter; Tina Turner; Tyler, the Creator

Artists that received multiple awards
Awards	Artist
3	Prince^{[A]}
2	Michael Jackson

- A Including his win with The Revolution.

== Notes ==
- Michael Jackson (1989), Prince (1995–1996) also won Brit Award for International Male Solo Artist
- Billie Eilish (2020–2021) also won Brit Award for International Female Solo Artist
