= Brit Awards 1985 =

British music awards ceremony

1985 Brit Awards
- Date: 11 February 1985
- Venue: Grosvenor House Hotel
- Hosted by: Noel Edmonds
- Most awards: Frankie Goes to Hollywood (2)
- Most nominations: Frankie Goes to Hollywood (5)

Television/radio coverage
- Network: BBC

The 1985 Brit Awards were the fifth edition of the biggest annual pop music awards in the United Kingdom. They are run by the British Phonographic Industry and took place on 11 February 1985 at Grosvenor House Hotel in London. This year marked the first presentation of the British Video of the Year and Soundtrack/Cast Recording awards, and the last presentation of the defunct International Artist award.

For the first time, the awards ceremony was televised by the BBC.

== Performances ==
- Alison Moyet – "All Cried Out"
- Bronski Beat – "Smalltown Boy"
- Howard Jones – "What Is Love"
- Nik Kershaw – "Wouldn't It Be Good"
- Tina Turner – "What's Love Got to Do with It"

== Winners and nominees ==
British Album of the Year	British Producer of the Year
Sade – Diamond Life; Frankie Goes to Hollywood – Welcome to the Pleasuredome; Nik Kershaw – Human Racing; Queen – The Works; U2 – The Unforgettable Fire	Trevor Horn; Jolley & Swain; Laurie Latham; Peter Collins; Steve Lillywhite
British Single of the Year	British Video of the Year
Frankie Goes to Hollywood – "Relax"; Bronski Beat – "Smalltown Boy"; Frankie Goes to Hollywood – "Two Tribes"; George Michael – "Careless Whisper"; Sade – "Smooth Operator"	Duran Duran – "The Wild Boys"; Wham! – "Last Christmas"; Wham! – "Wake Me Up Before You Go-Go"
British Male Solo Artist	British Female Solo Artist
Paul Young; David Bowie; Howard Jones; Nik Kershaw; Paul McCartney	Alison Moyet; Annie Lennox; Kim Wilde; Sade Adu; Tracey Ullman
British Group	British Breakthrough Act
Wham!; Bronski Beat; Frankie Goes to Hollywood; Queen; U2	Frankie Goes to Hollywood; Bronski Beat; Nik Kershaw
International Act	Soundtrack/Cast Recording
Prince and The Revolution; Bruce Springsteen; Lionel Richie; Michael Jackson; ZZ Top	Purple Rain; Electric Dreams; Footloose; Give My Regards to Broad Street; The Woman in Red
Comedy Recording	Classical Recording
Nigel Planer – "Hole in My Shoe"; Alexei Sayle – "'Ullo John! Gotta New Motor?"; Mel Brooks – "To Be or Not to Be"; Roland Rat – "Rat Rapping"; "Weird Al" Yankovic – "Eat It"	Christopher Hogwood – The Four Seasons; Bryden Thomson – Symphony No. 4; Carlo Maria Giulini – Il trovatore; Colin Davis – The Magic Flute; Colin Davis – The Turn of the Screw
Special Award	Outstanding Contribution to Music
Bob Geldof and Midge Ure	The Police

== Multiple nominations and awards ==
The following artists received multiple awards and/or nominations.

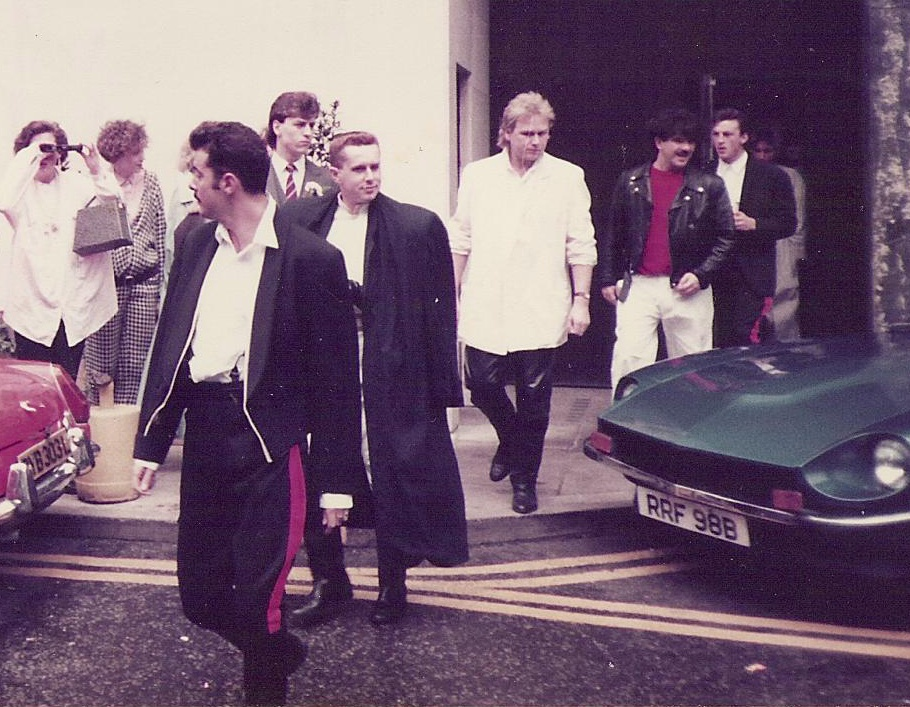
Two-time winner Frankie Goes to Hollywood as most nominations and awards

Artists that received multiple nominations
Nominations	Artist
5	Frankie Goes to Hollywood
3	Bronski Beat
3	Nik Kershaw
3	Sade
3	Wham!
2	Colin Davis
2	Queen
2	U2

Artists that received multiple awards
Awards	Artist
2	Frankie Goes to Hollywood
