= Brit Awards 1984 =

British music awards ceremony

1984 Brit Awards
- Date: 21 February 1984
- Venue: Grosvenor House Hotel
- Hosted by: Tim Rice
- Most awards: Culture Club and Michael Jackson (2)
- Most nominations: Paul Young and Tracey Ullman (2)

Brit Awards 1984 was the fourth event of the Brit Awards, an annual pop music award ceremony in the United Kingdom. It was run by the British Phonographic Industry and took place on 21 February 1984 at Grosvenor House Hotel in London. The host for the second year running was Tim Rice.

== Winners and nominees ==
British Producer of the Year	Classical Recording
Steve Levine; Alan Winstanley & Clive Langer; Peter Collins; Steve Lillywhite; Trevor Horn	Kiri Te Kanawa; Giacomo Puccini; Michael Tippett; Simon Rattle; Trevor Pinnock
British Male Solo Artist	British Female Solo Artist
David Bowie; Cliff Richard; Elton John; Paul McCartney; Paul Young	Annie Lennox; Alison Moyet; Bonnie Tyler; Toyah Willcox; Tracey Ullman
British Group	British Breakthrough Act
Culture Club; Eurythmics; Madness; The Police; UB40	Paul Young; Big Country; Howard Jones; Tracey Ullman; Wham!
International Artist	Special Achievement Award
Michael Jackson; Billy Joel; Hall & Oates; Lionel Richie; Men at Work	Best Selling Album of the Year: Michael Jackson – Thriller (United States); British Single of the Year: Culture Club – "Karma Chameleon"; Outstanding Contribution to Music: George Martin; Sony Trophy Award for Technical Excellence: Spandau Ballet

== Multiple nominations and awards ==
The following artists received multiple awards and/or nominations. don't counting British Album of the Year and British Single of the Year.

Artists that received multiple nominations
Nominations	Artist
2	Paul Young
2	Tracey Ullman
