= Brit Awards 1996 =

British music awards ceremony

- Date: 19 February 1996
- Venue: Earls Court
- Hosted by: Chris Evans

Television/radio coverage
- Network: ITV

Brit Awards 1996 was the 16th edition of the Brit Awards, an annual pop music awards ceremony in the United Kingdom. It was organised by the British Phonographic Industry and took place on 19 February 1996 at Earls Court Exhibition Centre in London. This was the last performance for Take That on British television ( although they would still perform outside of the United Kingdom) as they split up in April of the same year. However, they would regroup in 2005, but without Robbie Williams.

== Performances ==
- Alanis Morissette – "Hand in My Pocket"
- David Bowie – "Hallo Spaceboy" (with Pet Shop Boys), "Moonage Daydream" & "Under Pressure"
- Michael Jackson – "Earth Song"
- Pulp – "Sorted for E's & Wizz"
- Simply Red – "Fairground"
- Take That – "How Deep Is Your Love"

== Winners and nominees ==
British Album of the Year	British Producer of the Year
Oasis – (What's the Story) Morning Glory?; Blur – The Great Escape; Pulp – Different Class; Radiohead – The Bends; Paul Weller – Stanley Road	Brian Eno; John Leckie; Nellee Hooper; Owen Morris & Noel Gallagher; Stephen Street
British Single of the Year	British Video of the Year
Take That – "Back for Good"; Blur – "Country House"; Everything but the Girl – "Missing"; Oasis – "Wonderwall"; Pulp – "Common People" Eliminated; Annie Lennox – "No More I Love You's"; Edwyn Collins – "A Girl Like You"; Oasis – "Roll with It"; Simply Red – "Fairground"; Supergrass – "Alright"	Oasis – "Wonderwall"; Blur – "Country House"; Pulp – "Common People"; Radiohead – "Just"; Take That – "Back for Good" Eliminated; Blur – "The Universal"; Massive Attack – "Protection"; The Rolling Stones – "Like a Rolling Stone"; Simply Red – "Fairground"; Supergrass – "Alright"
British Male Solo Artist	British Female Solo Artist
Paul Weller; Edwyn Collins; Jimmy Nail; Tricky; Van Morrison	Annie Lennox; Joan Armatrading; PJ Harvey; Shara Nelson; Vanessa Mae
British Group	British Breakthrough Act
Oasis; Blur; Lightning Seeds; Pulp; Radiohead	Supergrass; Black Grape; Cast; Elastica; Tricky
British Dance Act	Soundtrack/Cast Recording
Massive Attack; Eternal; Leftfield; M People; Tricky	Batman Forever; Braveheart; Muriel's Wedding; Natural Born Killers; Waiting to Exhale
International Male Solo Artist	International Female Solo Artist
Prince; Coolio; Lenny Kravitz; Meat Loaf; Neil Young	Björk; Alanis Morissette; Celine Dion; k.d. lang; Mariah Carey
International Group	International Breakthrough Act
Bon Jovi; Green Day; Foo Fighters; Garbage; TLC	Alanis Morissette; Boyzone; Foo Fighters; Garbage; Tina Arena

=== Outstanding Contribution to Music ===
- David Bowie

=== Freddie Mercury Award ===
- The Help Album

=== Artist of a Generation ===
- Michael Jackson

== Notable moments ==
=== Michael Jackson and Jarvis Cocker ===
Michael Jackson was given a special Artist of a Generation award. At the ceremony he accompanied his single "Earth Song" with a stage show, culminating with Jackson as a 'Christ-like figure' surrounded by children. Pulp frontman Jarvis Cocker mounted the stage in what he would later claim as protest at this portion of the performance. Cocker ran across the stage, lifting his shirt and pointing his (clothed) bottom in Jackson's direction. Cocker was subsequently questioned by the police on suspicion of causing injury towards three of the children in Jackson's performance, who were now on stage. No criminal proceedings followed. It was later alleged that someone in Jackson's entourage hurt the children.

=== Oasis and Blur ===
1996 saw the height of a well-documented feud between Britpop rivals Oasis and Blur. The differing styles of the bands, coupled with their prominence within the Britpop movement, led the British media to seize upon the rivalry between the bands. Both factions played along, with the Gallaghers taunting Blur at the ceremony by singing a vulgar rendition of "Parklife" when they collected their "Best British Band" award.

== Cut moments ==
=== Oasis and Michael Hutchence ===
INXS frontman Michael Hutchence presented the British video award to Oasis, whose guitarist Noel Gallagher mocked Hutchence upon receiving the award, by sneering, ″Hasbeens shouldn't give awards to gonnabes″, which according to musician and producer Danny Saber upset Hutchence. This inspired Hutchence to add the lyrics ″I'm better than Oasis″ to INXS' single Elegantly Wasted, released the following year.
