= Brit Awards 1983 =

British music awards ceremony

- Date: 8 February 1983
- Venue: Grosvenor House Hotel
- Hosted by: Tim Rice
- Most awards: Paul McCartney (2)
- Most nominations: ABC and Yazoo (2)

Brit Awards 1983 was the third event of the Brit Awards, an annual pop music award ceremony in the United Kingdom. It was run by the British Phonographic Industry and took place on 8 February 1983 at Grosvenor House Hotel in London. The host was Tim Rice.

== Winners and nominees ==
| British Album of the Year | British Producer of the Year |
|---|---|
| Barbra Streisand – Memories (United States); The Kids from "Fame" – The Kids from "Fame" (United States); Madness – Complete Madness | Trevor Horn; Alan Winstanley & Clive Langer; George Martin; Martin Rushent |
| British Single of the Year | Classical Recording |
| Dexys Midnight Runners – "Come On Eileen"; Irene Cara – "Fame" (United States); Survivor – "Eye of the Tiger" (United States) | John Williams; Christopher Hogwood; Joaquín Rodrigo; Julian Lloyd Webber; Neville Marriner; Simon Rattle |
| British Male Solo Artist | British Female Solo Artist |
| Paul McCartney; Cliff Richard; Phil Collins; Shakin' Stevens | Kim Wilde; Mari Wilson; Sheena Easton; Toyah Willcox |
| British Group | British Breakthrough Act |
| Dire Straits; ABC; Yazoo | Yazoo; ABC; Culture Club; Musical Youth |
| International Artist | Special Achievement Award |
| Kid Creole and the Coconuts; Barry Manilow; Julio Iglesias | Special Award: Chris Wright; Sony Trophy Award for Technical Excellence: Paul McCartney; Outstanding Contribution to Music: The Beatles; Lifetime Achievement Award: Pete Townshend |

== Multiple nominations and awards ==
The following artists received multiple awards and/or nominations. don't count the Sony Trophy Award for Technical Excellence.

Artists that received multiple nominations
| Nominations | Artist |
|---|---|
| 2 | ABC |
| 2 | Yazoo |
