= Brit Awards 1993 =

British music awards ceremony

- Date: 16 February 1993
- Venue: Alexandra Palace
- Hosted by: Richard O'Brien
- Most awards: Annie Lennox (2)
- Most nominations: Shakespears Sister and Take That (4)

Television/radio coverage
- Network: ITV

Brit Awards 1993 was the 13th edition of the Brit Awards, an annual pop music award ceremony in the United Kingdom. They are run by the British Phonographic Industry and took place on 16 February 1993 at Alexandra Palace in London.

== Performances ==
- Andy Bell and k.d. lang – "No More Tears (Enough Is Enough)"
- Madness – "Night Boat to Cairo"
- Peter Gabriel – "Steam"
- Rod Stewart – "Ruby Tuesday"
- Simply Red – "Wonderland"
- Suede – "Animal Nitrate"
- Tasmin Archer – "Sleeping Satellite"

== Winners and nominees ==
| British Album of the Year | British Producer of the Year |
|---|---|
| Annie Lennox – Diva; Elton John – The One; Genesis – We Can't Dance; The Orb – U.F.Orb; Right Said Fred – Up; Shakespears Sister – Hormonally Yours | Peter Gabriel; Paul Oakenfold and Steve Osborne; Pete Waterman; Stephen Lipson; Trevor Horn |
| British Single of the Year | British Video of the Year |
| Take That – "Could It Be Magic"; Shakespears Sister – "Stay"; Take That – "It Only Takes a Minute"; Take That – "A Million Love Songs"; Wet Wet Wet – "Goodnight Girl" | Shakespears Sister – "Stay"; Annie Lennox – "Walking on Broken Glass"; Erasure – "Take a Chance on Me"; Genesis – "Jesus He Knows Me"; Simply Red – "For Your Babies" Eliminated; The Cure – "Friday I'm in Love"; George Michael – "Too Funky"; Lisa Stansfield – "All Woman"; Peter Gabriel – "Digging in the Dirt"; Tasmin Archer – "Sleeping Satellite" |
| British Male Solo Artist | British Female Solo Artist |
| Mick Hucknall; Elton John; Eric Clapton; George Michael; Joe Cocker; Phil Collins | Annie Lennox; Kate Bush; Lisa Stansfield; Siobhan Fahey; Tasmin Archer |
| British Group | British Breakthrough Act |
| Simply Red; The Cure; Erasure; Right Said Fred; Shakespears Sister | Tasmin Archer; Dina Carroll; KWS; Take That; Undercover |
| Special Achievement Award | International Solo Artist |
| Outstanding Contribution to Music: Rod Stewart; Most Successful Live Act: U2 | Prince; Curtis Stigers; Enya; k.d. lang; Madonna; Tori Amos |
| International Group | International Breakthrough Act |
| R.E.M.; Crowded House; En Vogue; Nirvana; U2 | Nirvana; Arrested Development; Boyz II Men; Curtis Stigers; Tori Amos |
| Classical Recording | Soundtrack/Cast Recording |
| Nigel Kennedy; Cecilia Bartoli; Henryk Górecki; John Tavener; Nikolaus Harnoncourt | Wayne's World; Bugsy; Frankie and Johnny; Hook; Mo' Money |

== Multiple nominations and awards ==
The following artists received multiple awards and/or nominations. don't counting Most Successful Live Act.

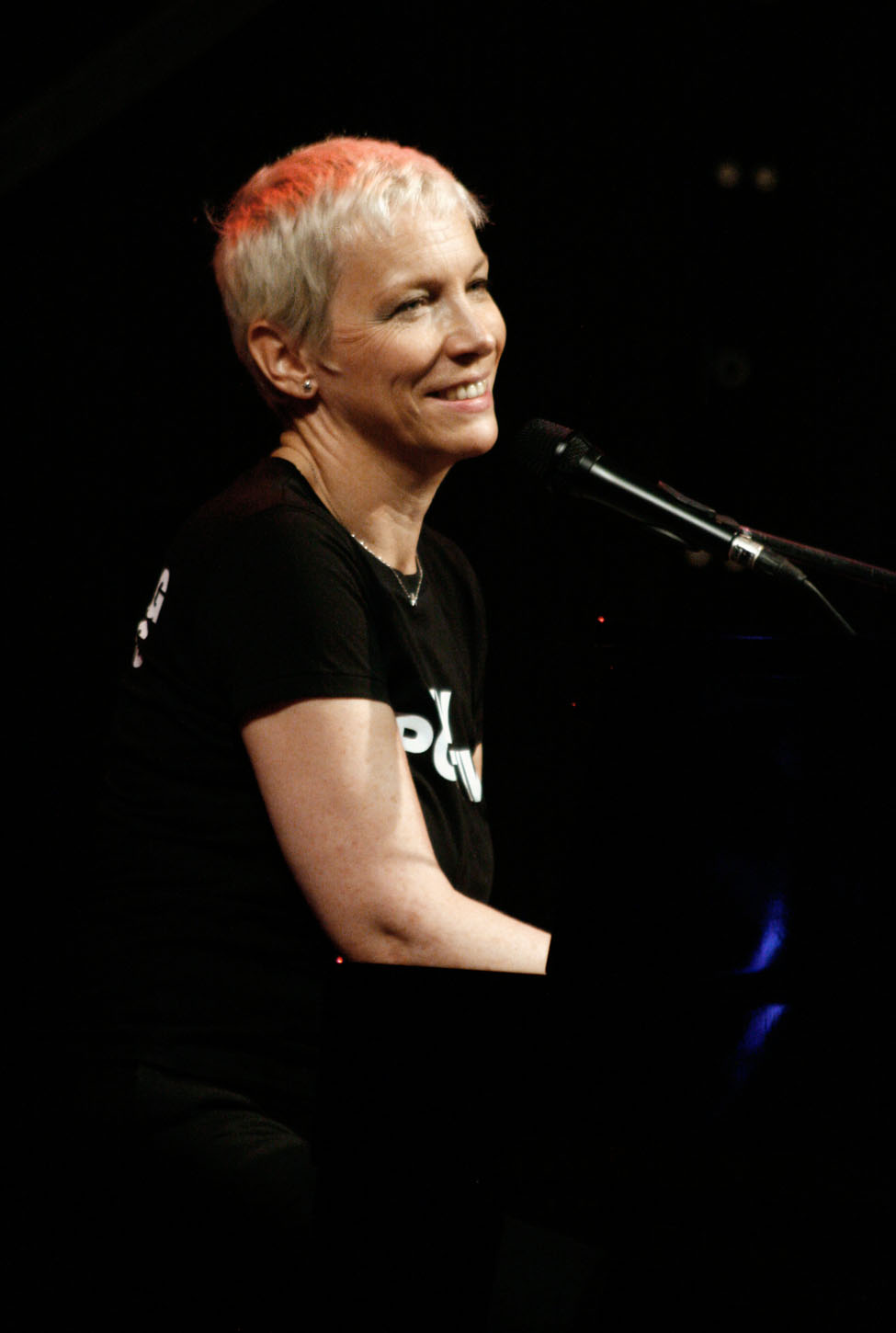
Two-time winner Annie Lennox

Artists that received multiple nominations
| Nominations | Artist |
|---|---|
| 4 | Shakespears Sister |
| 4 | Take That |
| 3 | Annie Lennox |
| 3 | Tasmin Archer |
| 2 | The Cure |
| 2 | Curtis Stigers |
| 2 | Elton John |
| 2 | Erasure |
| 2 | Genesis |
| 2 | George Michael |
| 2 | Lisa Stansfield |
| 2 | Nirvana |
| 2 | Peter Gabriel |
| 2 | Right Said Fred |
| 2 | Simply Red |

Artists that received multiple awards
| Awards | Artist |
|---|---|
| 2 | Annie Lennox |
