= Brit Awards 1986 =

British music awards ceremony

1986 Brit Awards
- Date: 10 February 1986
- Venue: Grosvenor House Hotel
- Hosted by: Noel Edmonds
- Most awards: Phil Collins (2)
- Most nominations: Dire Straits (4)

Television/radio coverage
- Network: BBC

The 1986 Brit Awards were the sixth edition of the biggest annual pop music awards in the United Kingdom. They are run by the British Phonographic Industry and took place on 10 February 1986 at Grosvenor House Hotel in London. This year marked the first presentation of the International Group and International Solo Artist awards.

The awards ceremony, hosted by Noel Edmonds, was televised by the BBC.

== Performances ==
- Huey Lewis and the News – "The Power of Love"
- Kate Bush – "Hounds of Love"
- Phil Collins – "One More Night"
- Tears for Fears – "Everybody Wants to Rule the World"

== Winners and nominees ==
| British Album of the Year | British Producer of the Year |
|---|---|
| Phil Collins – No Jacket Required; Dire Straits – Brothers in Arms; Eurythmics – Be Yourself Tonight; Kate Bush – Hounds of Love; Tears for Fears – Songs from the Big Chair | David A. Stewart; Chris Hughes; Hugh Padgham; Steve Lillywhite; Trevor Horn |
| British Single of the Year | British Video of the Year |
| Tears for Fears – "Everybody Wants to Rule the World"; David Bowie and Mick Jagger – "Dancing in the Street"; Dire Straits – "Money for Nothing"; Kate Bush – "Running Up That Hill"; Paul Hardcastle – "19" | Paul Young – "Everytime You Go Away"; David Bowie and Mick Jagger – "Dancing in the Street"; Dire Straits – "Money for Nothing" |
| British Male Solo Artist | British Female Solo Artist |
| Phil Collins; Elton John; Midge Ure; Paul Young; Sting | Annie Lennox; Alison Moyet; Kate Bush; Sade Adu; Bonnie Tyler |
| British Group | British Breakthrough Act |
| Dire Straits; Eurythmics; Simple Minds; Tears for Fears; U2 | Go West |
| International Group | International Solo Artist |
| Huey Lewis and the News; The Cars; Kool & the Gang; Talking Heads; ZZ Top | Bruce Springsteen; Lionel Richie; Madonna; Stevie Wonder; Tina Turner |
| Classical Recording | Outstanding Contribution to Music |
| Nigel Kennedy; Georg Solti; John Rutter; Julian Lloyd Webber; Trevor Pinnock | Elton John and Wham! |

== Multiple nominations and awards ==
The following artists received multiple awards and/or nominations. don't counting Outstanding Contribution to Music.

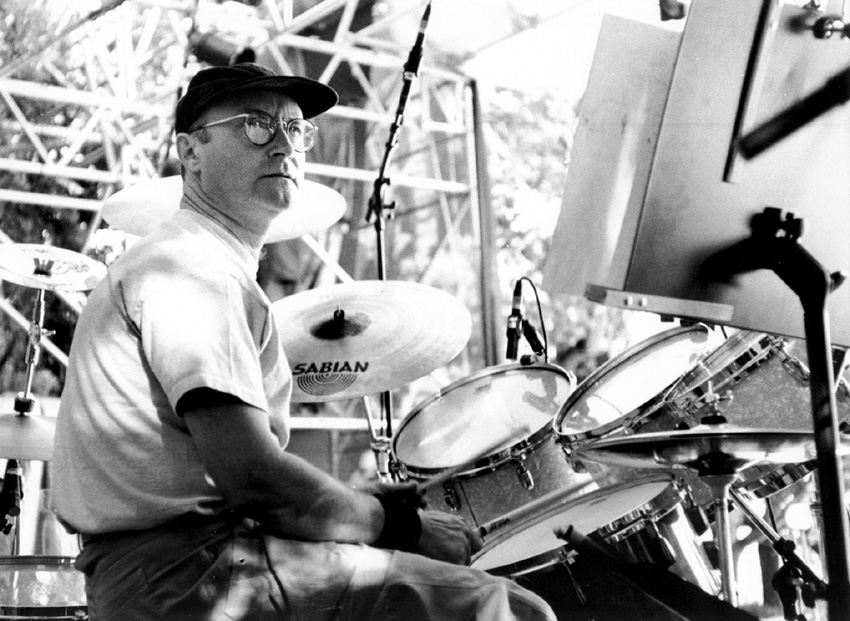
Two-time winner Phil Collins

Artists that received multiple nominations
| Nominations | Artist |
|---|---|
| 4 | Dire Straits |
| 3 | Tears for Fears |
| 3 | Kate Bush |
| 2 | David Bowie |
| 2 | Eurythmics |
| 2 | Mick Jagger |
| 2 | Phil Collins |

Artists that received multiple awards
| Awards | Artist |
|---|---|
| 2 | Phil Collins |
