= Brit Award for Outstanding Contribution to Music =

British music award

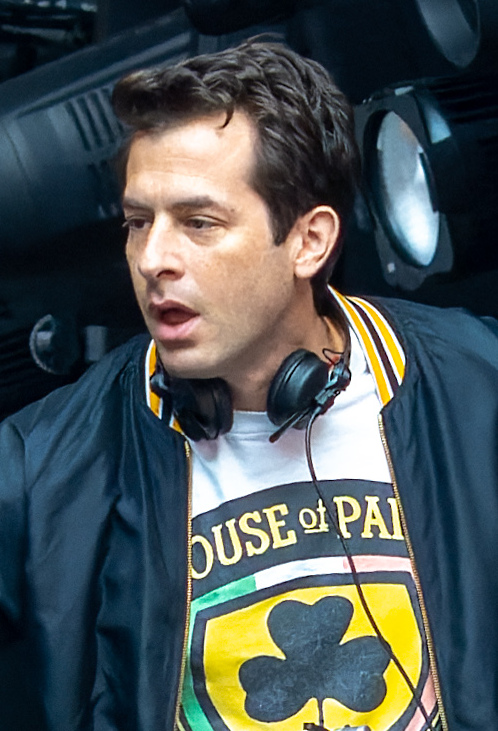
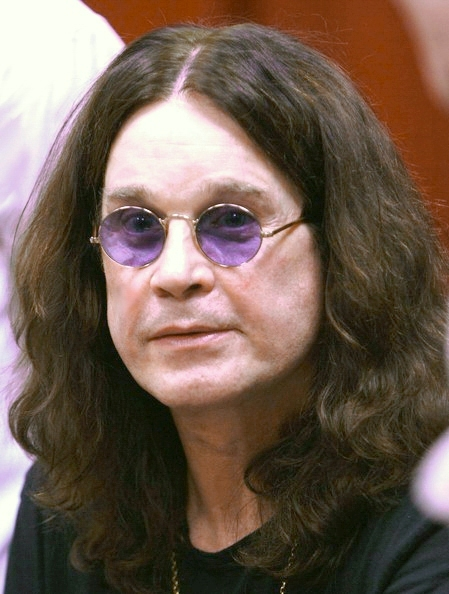
- 2026 winners Mark Ronson (left) and Ozzy Osbourne (right)
- Awarded for: Achievement in excellence in music
- Country: United Kingdom (UK)
- Presented by: British Phonographic Industry (BPI)
- First award: 1977
- Currently held by: Mark Ronson and Ozzy Osbourne (2026)

Highlights
- Most awards: Paul McCartney, John Lennon and Elton John (3)
- Website: www.brits.co.uk

The Brit Award for Outstanding Contribution to Music is the Lifetime Achievement award given by the British Phonographic Industry (BPI), an organisation which represents record companies and artists in the United Kingdom. The accolade is presented at the Brit Awards, an annual celebration of British and international music. The honourees are determined by the Brit Awards voting academy with over one-thousand members, which comprise record labels, publishers, managers, agents, media, and previous winners and nominees.

== History ==
The award was first presented in 1977 and was subsequently awarded annually from 1982 to 2010. The award has since been presented intermittently as the BRIT's Icon Award, with the original name being re-instated at the 2019 Brit Awards ceremony. Since 2000, the Classic BRIT Awards have also annually presented their own Outstanding Contribution to Music Award. The award was last presented under its original name at 2019 Brit Awards. However, the Global Icon Award, which was described as the BRIT's "highest accolade", and an international version of the BRIT's Icon Award, was presented in 2021 to Taylor Swift. The award returned to its original name for the 2026 ceremony, where it was presented to producer Mark Ronson. In 1989 and 2026, the award was also referred to as the Lifetime Achievement Award.

Elton John, Paul McCartney and John Lennon are the artists with the most wins with three awards. U2 were the first international band to receive the BRIT award while Pink and Bob Geldof were the first female solo artist and the first international artist to receive it respectively. Cecilia Bartoli and Andrea Bocelli were the first female soloist and international artist respectively to receive the Classic BRIT Award. Freddie Mercury's last public appearance before his death from HIV/AIDS would be when he accepted the award in 1990 as a member of Queen. Mercury was posthumously honoured with the award again two years later at the 1992 ceremony. Two other artists have received the award posthumously; John Lennon in 1982 and Ozzy Osbourne in 2026.

== Contemporary winners ==
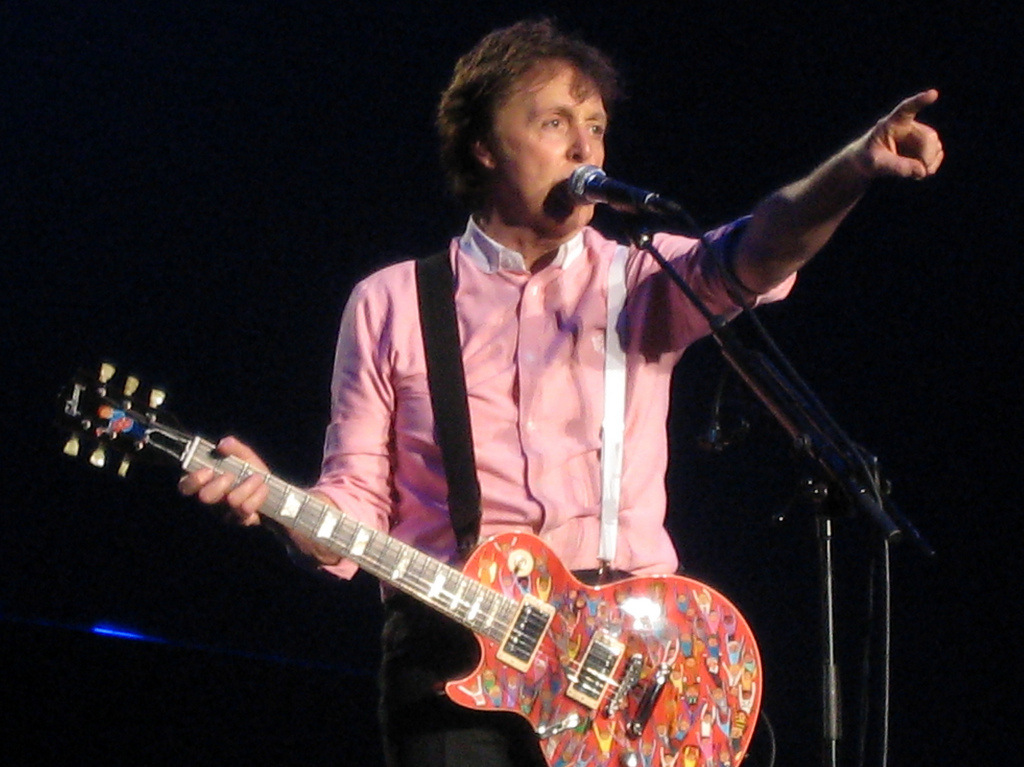
Paul McCartney received the award in 1977 and 1983 as part of The Beatles and in 2008 as a solo artist

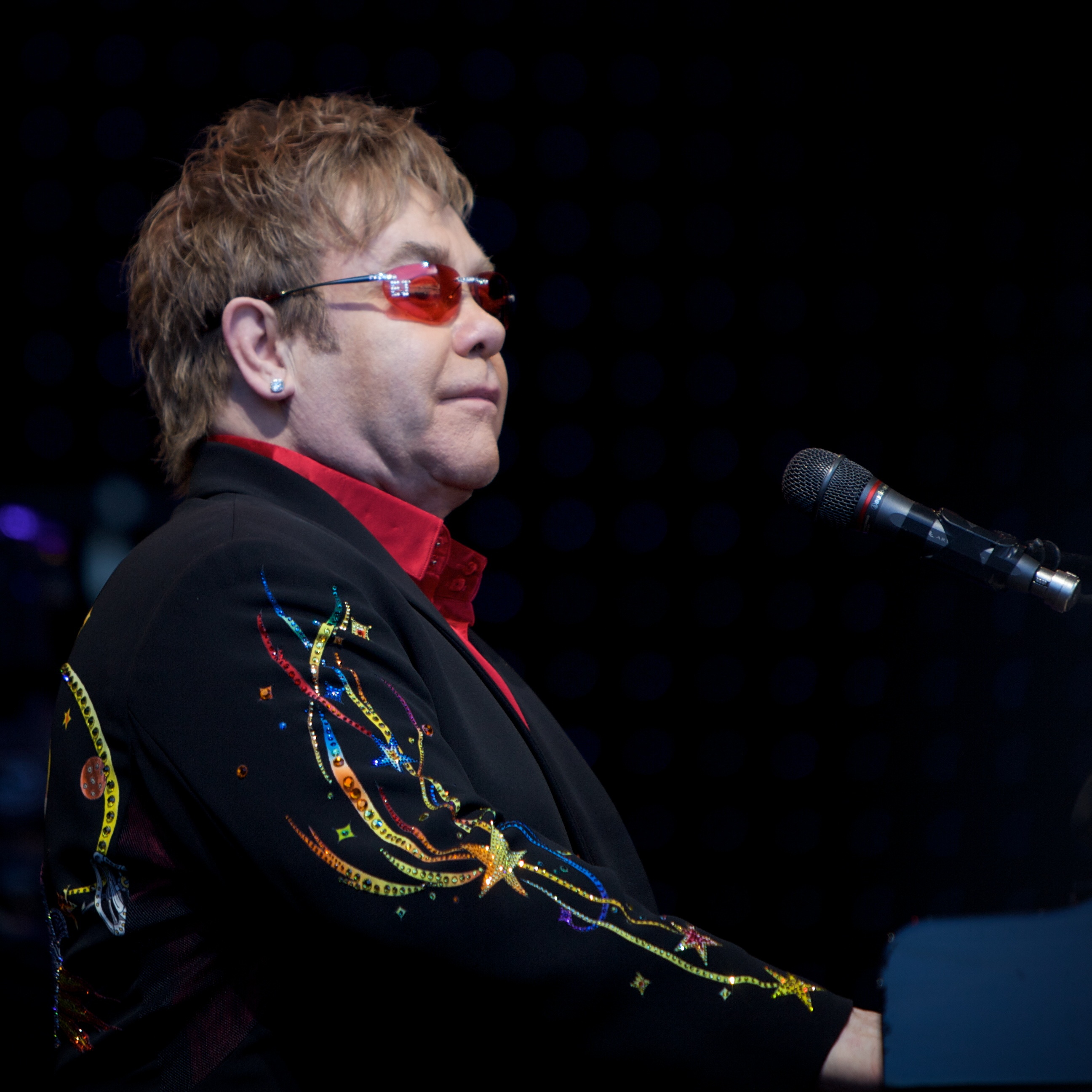
1986, 1995 and 2014 honouree Elton John

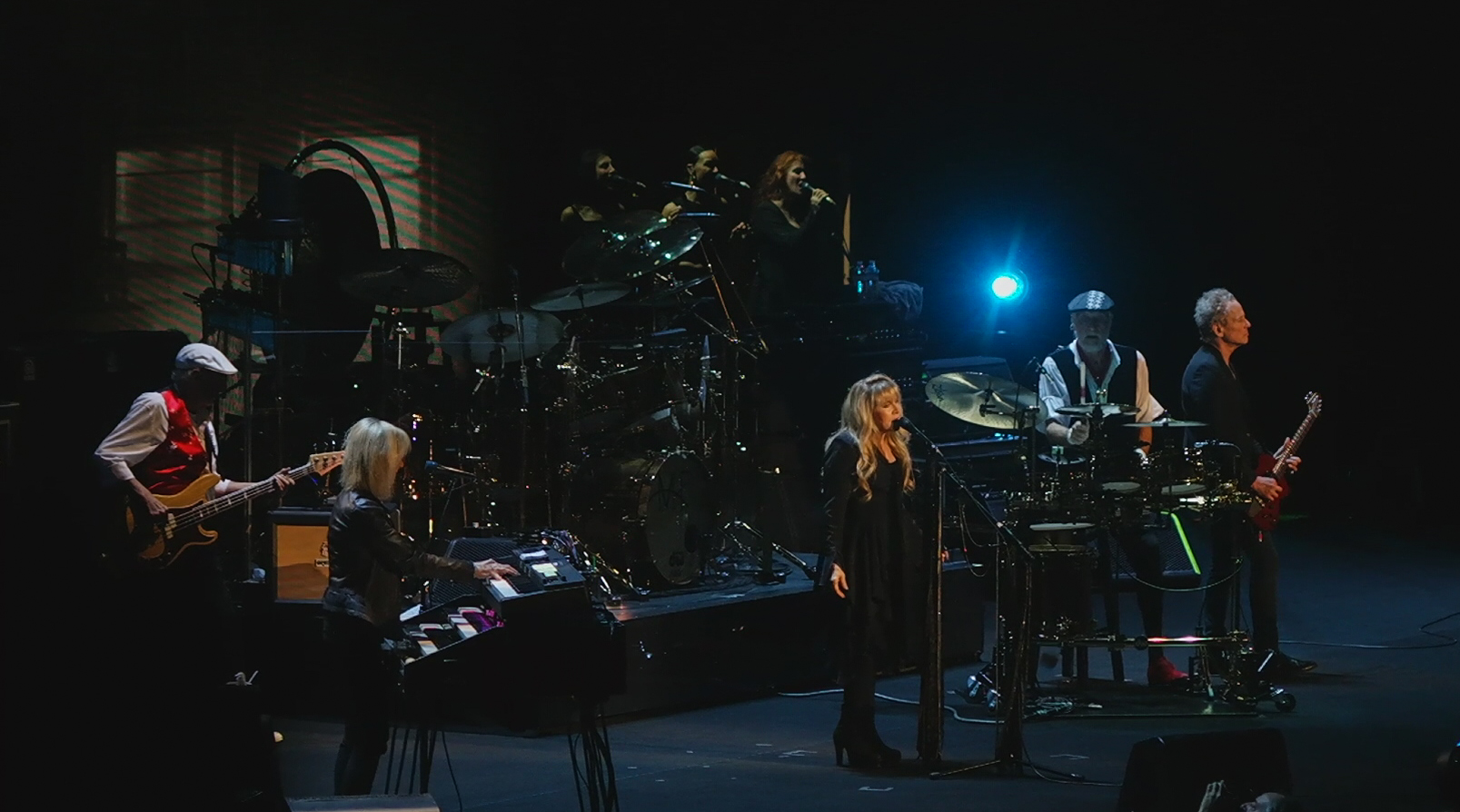
1998 winners Fleetwood Mac

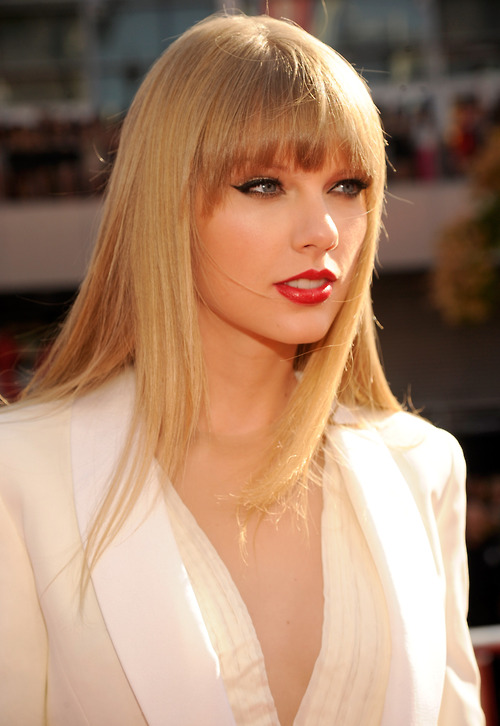
2021 winner Taylor Swift

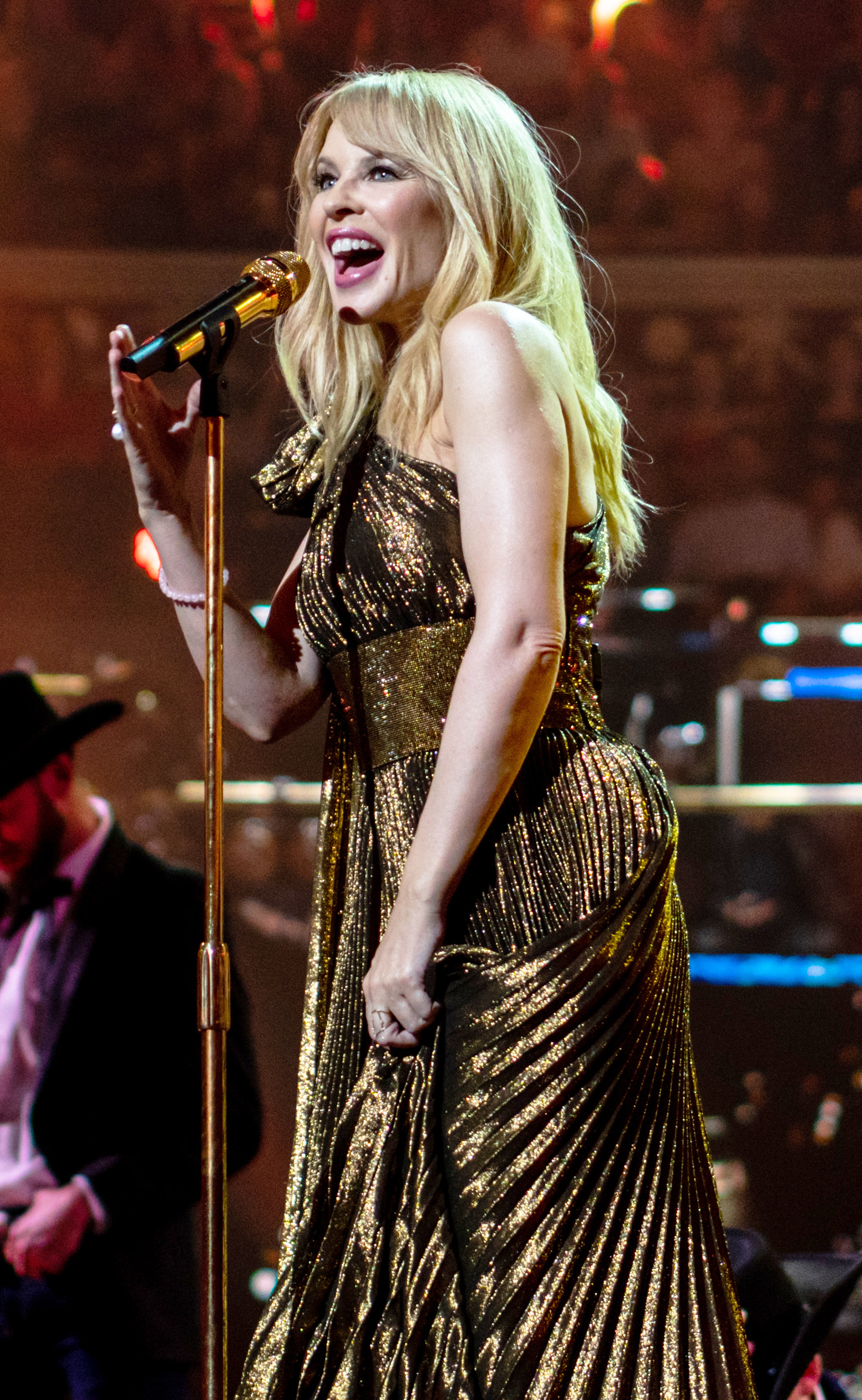
2024 winner Kylie Minogue

Indicates a non-British artist

Year	Recipient(s)
1977	LG Wood and The Beatles
1982	John Lennon (posthumously)
1983	The Beatles
1984	George Martin
1985	The Police
1986	Elton John and Wham!
1987	Eric Clapton
1988	The Who
1989	Cliff Richard (Lifetime Achievement Award)
1990	Queen
1991	Status Quo
1992	Freddie Mercury (posthumously)
1993	Rod Stewart
1994	Van Morrison
1995	Elton John
1996	David Bowie
1997	Bee Gees
1998	Fleetwood Mac
1999	Eurythmics
2000	Spice Girls
2001	(Republic of Ireland) U2
2002	Sting
2003	Tom Jones
2004	Duran Duran
2005	(Republic of Ireland) Bob Geldof
2006	Paul Weller
2007	Oasis
2008	Paul McCartney
2009	Pet Shop Boys
2010	Robbie Williams
2012	Blur
2014	Elton John (Icon Award)
2016	David Bowie (Icon Award)
2017	Robbie Williams (Icon Award)
2019	(United States) Pink
2021	(United States) Taylor Swift (Global Icon Award)
2024	(Australia) Kylie Minogue (Global Icon Award)
2026	Mark Ronson
2026	Ozzy Osbourne (Lifetime Achievement Award) (posthumously)

== Classic winners ==
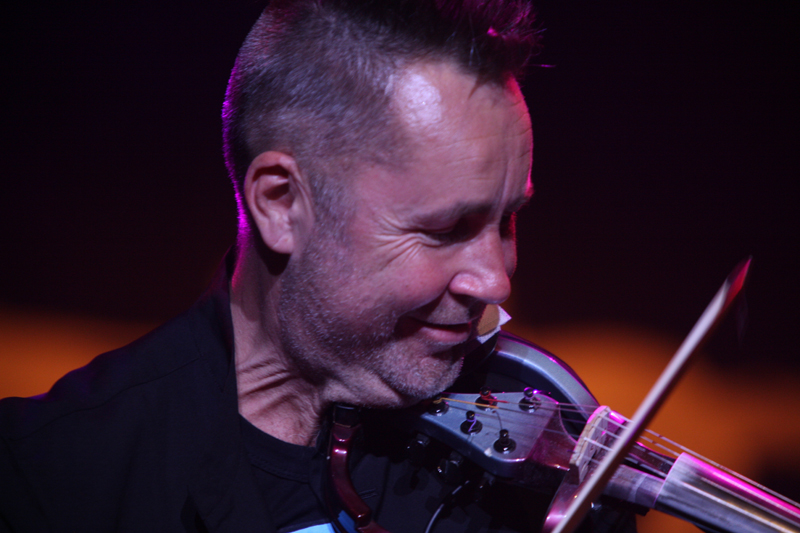
Inaugural winner Nigel Kennedy

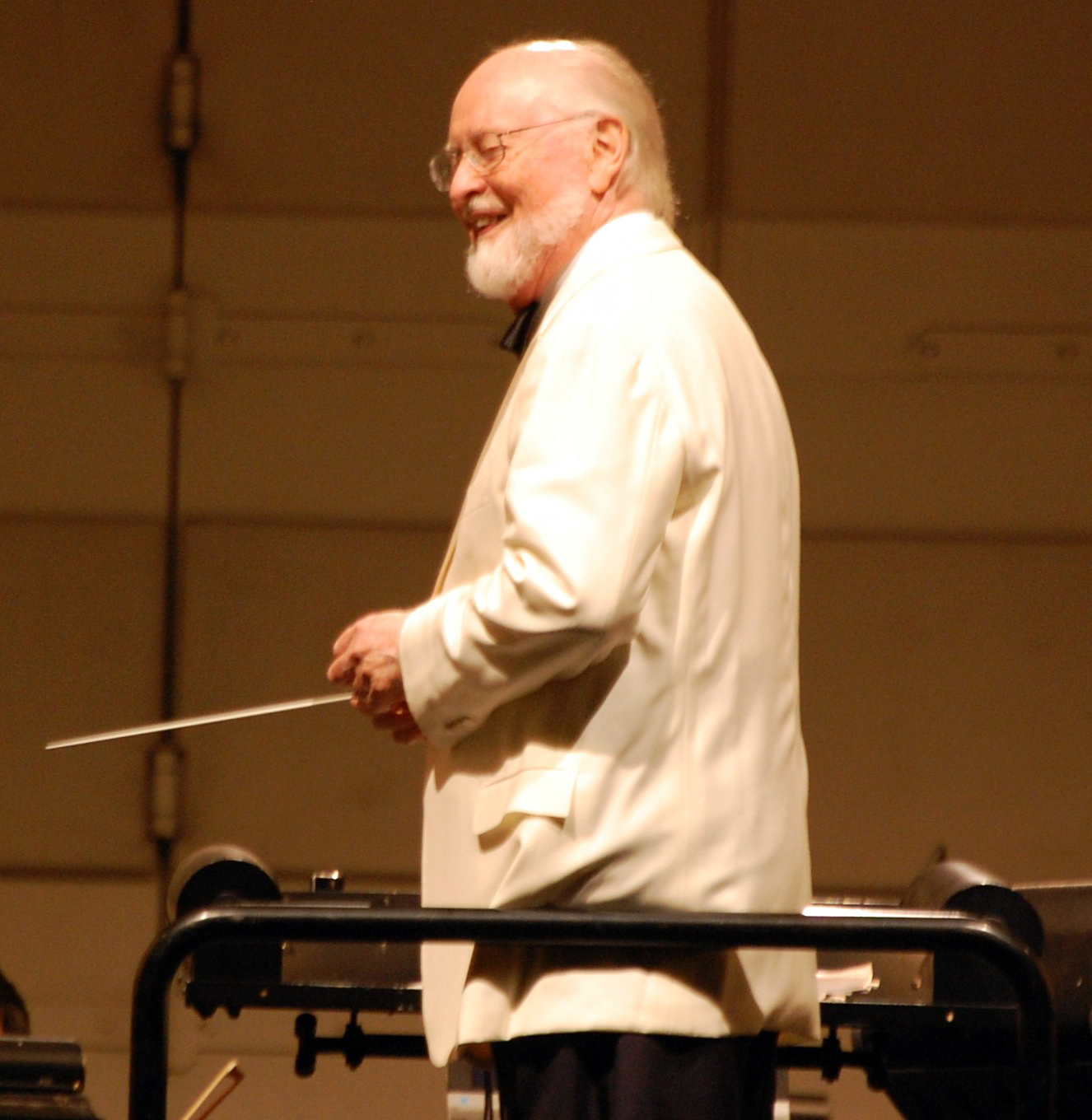
Composer John Williams received the award in 2012

Indicates a non-British artist

Year	Recipient
2000	Nigel Kennedy
2001	Simon Rattle
2002	(Italy) Andrea Bocelli
2003	(Italy) Cecilia Bartoli
2004	(United States) Renée Fleming
2005	(Republic of Ireland) James Galway
2006	(Spain) Placido Domingo
2007	Vernon Handley
2008	Andrew Lloyd Webber
2009	(Spain) José Carreras
2010	(New Zealand) Kiri Te Kanawa
2011	John Barry (posthumously)
2012	(United States) John Williams
2013	(Germany) Hans Zimmer
2014	(Italy) Luciano Pavarotti (posthumously)
2018	Vera Lynn

== Artists with multiple wins ==
- John Lennon has received the award three times (1977 and 1983 as a member of The Beatles and 1982 as a solo artist)
- Paul McCartney has received the award three times (1977 and 1983 as a member of The Beatles and 2008 as a solo artist)
- Elton John has received the award three times (1986 and 1995 for Outstanding Contribution and 2014 as a BRIT's Icon)
- The Beatles have received the award twice (1977 and 1983)
- Sting has received the award twice (1985 as a member of The Police and 2002 as a solo artist)
- Freddie Mercury has received the award twice (1990 as a member of Queen and 1992 as a solo artist)
- David Bowie has received the award twice (1996 for Outstanding Contribution and 2016 as a BRIT's Icon)
- Robbie Williams has received the award twice (2010 for Outstanding Contribution and 2017 as a BRIT's Icon)
