= Brit Awards 1992 =

British music awards ceremony

- Date: 12 February 1992
- Venue: Hammersmith Apollo
- Hosted by: Simon Bates
- Most awards: Seal (3)
- Most nominations: The KLF and Seal (4)

Television/radio coverage
- Network: BBC

Brit Awards 1992 was the 12th edition of the Brit Awards, an annual pop music awards ceremony in the United Kingdom. They are run by the British Phonographic Industry and took place on 12 February 1992 at Hammersmith Apollo in London.

== Performances ==
- Beverley Craven – "Promise Me"
- Extreme – "More Than Words"/"Hole Hearted"
- The KLF vs Extreme Noise Terror – "3 a.m. Eternal"
- Lisa Stansfield – "All Woman"
- P.M. Dawn – "Set Adrift on Memory Bliss"
- Seal – "Crazy"
- Simply Red – "Stars"

== Winners and nominees ==
British Album of the Year	British Producer of the Year
Seal – Seal; Beverley Craven – Beverley Craven; The KLF – The White Room; Massive Attack – Blue Lines; Simply Red – Stars	Trevor Horn; David A. Stewart; Johnny Marr; Mark Knopfler; Stock Aitken Waterman; Youth
British Single of the Year	British Video of the Year
Queen – "These Are the Days of Our Lives"; Gareth Hale and Norman Pace – "The Stonk"; Iron Maiden – "Bring Your Daughter... to the Slaughter"; Jason Donovan – "Any Dream Will Do"; The KLF – "3 a.m. Eternal"; Vic Reeves and The Wonder Stuff – "Dizzy"	Seal – "Killer"; Airhead – "Funny How"; Billy Bragg – "Sexuality"; Erasure – "Love to Hate You"; The KLF – "Last Train to Trancentral"; Lisa Stansfield – "Change"; Midge Ure – "Cold, Cold Heart"; Shakespears Sister – "Goodbye Cruel World"; Simply Red – "Stars"; The Wonder Stuff – "The Size of a Cow"
British Male Solo Artist	British Female Solo Artist
Seal; Elton John; George Michael; Kenny Thomas; Phil Collins; Van Morrison	Lisa Stansfield; Annie Lennox; Beverley Craven; Cathy Dennis; Zoë
British Group	British Breakthrough Act
The KLF and Simply Red; Dire Straits; James; Pet Shop Boys; Queen	Beverley Craven; Cathy Dennis; EMF; Kenny Thomas; Seal
Outstanding Contribution to Music	International Solo Artist
Freddie Mercury	Prince; Bryan Adams; Enya; Madonna; Michael Bolton
International Group	International Breakthrough Act
R.E.M.; Extreme; Guns N' Roses; INXS; U2	P.M. Dawn; Chris Isaak; Color Me Badd; Extreme; Harry Connick Jr.; Jellyfish
Classical Recording	Soundtrack/Cast Recording
Georg Solti; Osmo Vänskä; Jane Glover; John Eliot Gardiner; Leonard Bernstein	The Commitments; The Doors; Five Guys Named Moe; Inspector Morse; Robin Hood: Prince of Thieves

== Multiple nominations and awards ==
The following artists received multiple awards and/or nominations.

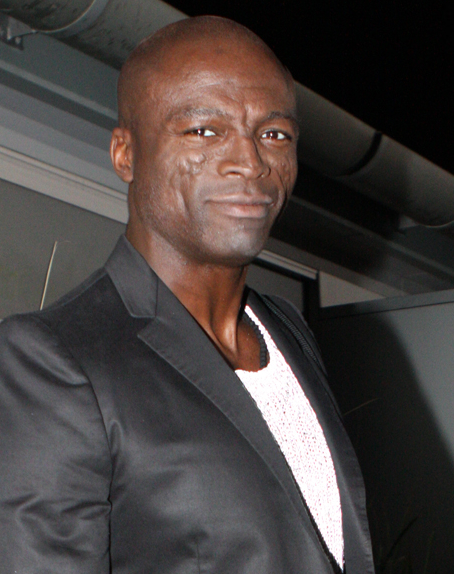
Three-time winner Seal as most nominations and awards

Artists that received multiple nominations
Nominations	Artist
4	The KLF
4	Seal
3	Beverley Craven
3	Simply Red
2	Cathy Dennis
2	Extreme
2	Kenny Thomas
2	Lisa Stansfield
2	Queen
2	The Wonder Stuff

Artists that received multiple awards
Awards	Artist
3	Seal

== KLF controversy ==
The KLF and Extreme Noise Terror performed a live version of "3 a.m. Eternal" at the BRIT Awards ceremony in February 1992. The Brits performance included a limping, kilted, cigar-chomping Drummond firing blanks from an automatic weapon over the heads of the crowd. After viewing the rehearsals, NME writer Danny Kelly said: "Compared to what's preceded it, this is a turbo-powered metallic wolf breaking into a coop full of particularly sick doves... And the noise? Well, the noise is hardcore punk thrash through a disco techno hit played by crusties. All bases covered, brilliantly. Clever, clever bastards." At the end of the performance, Scott Piering announced to a stunned crowd that "The KLF have now left the music business". Within a few months, they did just that - their records were deleted and the KLF retired from the industry. Kelly later described the Brits performance as the KLF's "self-destruction in an orgy of punk rock..., mock outrage ... and real bad taste".
