= Don't Go =

Don't Go may refer to:

== Film and television ==
- Don't Go (2010 film), a Turkish film
- Don't Go (2018 film), an Irish film
- "Don't Go" (Friday Night Lights), an episode of the TV series Friday Night Lights

== Songs ==
- "Don't Go" (En Vogue song), 1991
- "Don't Go" (Hothouse Flowers song), 1987
- "Don't Go" (Marlon Jackson song), 1987
- "Don't Go" (Pseudo Echo song), 1985
- "Don't Go" (Skrillex, Justin Bieber and Don Toliver song), 2021
- "Don't Go" (Wretch 32 song), 2011
- "Don't Go" (Yazoo song), 1982
- "Don't Go (Girls and Boys)", by Fefe Dobson, 2004
- "Don't Go", by Bring Me the Horizon from There Is a Hell Believe Me I've Seen It. There Is a Heaven Let's Keep It a Secret.
- "Don't Go", by Craig David from Following My Intuition
- "Don't Go", by Doro from Angels Never Die
- "Don't Go", by Embodyment from Songs for the Living
- "Don't Go", by Exo from XOXO
- "Don't Go", by F. R. David
- "Don't Go", by George Jones and Melba Montgomery from What's in Our Heart
- "Don't Go", by J. Holiday from Round 2
- "Don't Go", by JLS from JLS
- "Don't Go", by Judas Priest from Point of Entry
- "Don't Go", by Le Click
- "Don't Go", by Mad Caddies from Keep It Going
- "Don't Go", by Matthew Sweet from Girlfriend
- "Don't Go", by Pearl Jam from Ten
- "Don't Go", by Rae Morris from Unguarded
- "Don't Go", by Ramones from Pleasant Dreams
- "Don't Go", by Ugly Kid Joe from America's Least Wanted

== Other uses ==
- DontGo, a free market political activist non-profit group based in the United States

== See also ==
- Please Don't Go (disambiguation)
- Don't Leave (disambiguation)
