= Don't Leave Me Alone (disambiguation) =

"Don't Leave Me Alone" is a 2018 song by David Guetta featuring Anne-Marie.

Don't Leave Me Alone may also refer to:

- "Don't Leave Me Alone", a 1978 song by Half Brother from Half Brother
- "Don't Leave Me Alone", a 1995 song by DJ Paul Elstak from May the Forze Be With You
- "Don't Leave Me Alone", a 1996 song by Amy Sky
- "Don't Leave Me Alone", a 1997 song by Casiopea from Light and Shadows
- "Don't Leave Me Alone", a 2002 song by LiveonRelease from Fifteen Will Get You Twenty
- "Don't Leave Me Alone", a 2004 song by Ashanti from Concrete Rose
- "Don't Leave Me Alone", a 2005 song by Mai Kuraki from Fuse of Love
- "Don't Leave Me Alone", a 2006 song by Tarkan from Come Closer
- "Don't Leave Me Alone", a 2006 song by the Preytells
- "(Don't) Leave Me Alone", a 2008 song by Ayumi Hamasaki from Guilty
- "Don't Leave Me Alone", a 2012 song by T-ara from Day by Day

== Other uses ==
- "No Me Dejes Solo", a 2004 song by Daddy Yankee
- Don't Leave Me Alone, Daisy, a 1980s Japanese manga series

== See also ==
- Don't Leave (disambiguation)
- Don't Leave Me (disambiguation)
- Leave Me Alone (disambiguation)
