= GRRR! It's Betty Boo =

Studio album by Betty Boo
- Released: 12 October 1992
- Recorded: 1992
- Genre: Dance-pop; pop rap
- Length: 38:44
- Label: WEA
- Producer: Betty Boo; John Coxon; Paul Myers; Dean Ross

Betty Boo chronology
Boomania (1990)	GRRR! It's Betty Boo (1992)	Doin' the Do: The Best of Betty Boo (1999)

Singles from GRRR! It's Betty Boo
- 1. "Let Me Take You There" Released: 27 July 1992; 2. "I'm on My Way" Released: 21 September 1992; 3. "Hangover" Released: 29 March 1993

Grrr! It's Betty Boo is the second studio album by the English singer Betty Boo, released on 12 October 1992 via WEA Records. This album failed to match the success of her debut studio album, Boomania (1990), stalling at No. 62 in the UK Albums Chart. The album did however garner one hit single with "Let Me Take You There", which peaked at No. 12 in the UK Singles Chart. Further singles from the album were "I'm on My Way", "Catch Me", "Thing Goin' On" and "Hangover". The record is dedicated to her father. The cover art is based on the iconic package of Tigra cigarettes. After this, Betty Boo retired from the music industry for several years.

== Critical reception ==
Professional ratings
Review scores
Source	Rating
AllMusic	4/5 stars
Classic Pop	3.5/5 stars
NME	5/10
The Philadelphia Inquirer	3.5/4 stars
PopMatters	8/10
Q	3/5 stars
Record Collector	3/5 stars
Select	3/5

Writing for The Guardian in October 1992, Adam Sweeting thought that Grrr! contained "more than its fair share of garish artificial charm", surmising that although Boo's songs "hang on a fragile thread of absurdity", presenting critics with an easy target, "her kittenish raps – usually about boys and boy-trouble – bristle with winningly daft rhymes". AllMusic's William Ruhlmann noted that "Boo raps through the verses and sings the choruses ... in an engaging enough manner, but she never threatens to be more than a cartoon". Madonna praised the album in a 1994 interview with Q, describing it as "horribly ignored".

== Track listing ==
All tracks are written by Alison Clarkson and John Coxon, except as noted.

Standard edition
No.	Title	Writer(s)	Length
1.	"I'm on My Way"	Clarkson; Coxon; John Lennon; Paul McCartney	3:22
2.	"Thing Goin' On"	Clarkson; Coxon; McCauley; Larry Young; L. Logan; P. Saunders	3:41
3.	"Hangover"		3:49
4.	"Curly & Girly"		4:22
5.	"Wish You Were Here"		4:17
6.	"Let Me Take You There"	Clarkson; Coxon; Dawes; Sigman	3:58
7.	"Gave You the Boo"		4:00
8.	"Skin Tight"	Clarkson; Paul Myers; Dean Ross	3:38
9.	"Catch Me"	Clarkson; Myers; Ross	3:47
10.	"Close the Door"		3:38

2016 reissue – Disc 1 bonus tracks
No.	Title	Length
11.	"Jet Sex" (7" version)
12.	"Platform Shoe Shuffle" (7" edit (Note: Previously unreleased on CD.))
13.	"I'm on My Way" (Tumpin' Dub)
14.	"Let Me Take You There" (Ubiquity Mix)
15.	"Hangover" (Sunday Morning Remix (Note: Previously unreleased in the UK.))
16.	"Thing Goin' On" (MK radio remix)
17.	"Catch Me" (12" version)

2016 reissue – Disc 2
No.	Title	Length
1.	"Let Me Take You There" (12" version)
2.	"I'm on My Way" (The Batman and Robin Mix)
3.	"Hangover" (12" mix)
4.	"Thing Goin' On" (MK club mix)
5.	"Catch Me" (original version)
6.	"Jet Sex" (12" version)
7.	"Platform Shoe Shuffle" (extended version)
8.	"Let Me Take You There" (Away Mix)
9.	"I'm on My Way" (Boo Choons)
10.	"Hangover" (Saturday Night Remix)
11.	"Catch Me" (London Underground Mix)
12.	"Thing Goin' On" (MK Underground Mix)
13.	"Let Me Take You There" (Take U There Mix)

=== Samples ===
- "I'm on My Way" contains an interpolation of "Lady Madonna", written by John Lennon and Paul McCartney. The saxophone line is not taken directly from The Beatles' original version, but is a re-creation featuring the same session players: Ronnie Scott, Harry Klein, Bill Povey and Bill Jackman.
- "Thing Goin' On" contains a sample of "Turn Off the Lights", written by Young, Logan & Saunders and performed by Larry Young's Fuel.
- "Let Me Take You There" contains a sample of "It's All in the Game", written by Charles Dawes and Carl Sigman, as performed by The Four Tops. The instrumental break contains a sample of "Pet Sounds", written by Brian Wilson and performed by The Beach Boys.
- "Close the Door" begins with a bass arrangement bearing strong similarities to Barry White's "I'm Gonna Love You Just a Little More Baby".

== Personnel ==
- Betty Boo – producer, pre-production, vocals

=== Additional musicians ===
- Ronnie Scott – saxophone on track 1
- Harry Klein – saxophone on track 1
- Bill Povey – saxophone on track 1
- Bill Jackman – saxophone on track 1
- Gary Plumbley – saxophone on track 8
- Guy Barker – flumpet on track 2
- Richard Niles – string arrangement on track 3
- Roger Rettig – pedal steel on track 3
- Frank Ton Ton – drums on track 6
- Michael Rosenberg – guitar on track 8
- Sweet Paulino – percussion on track 8
- Fenella Barton – strings on track 9
- Sian Bell – strings on track 9
- Sonia Shany – strings on track 9
- Jocelyn Pook – strings on track 9

=== Technical personnel ===
- John Coxon – producer, pre-production "Done Upstairs"
- Mads Bjerke – recording, engineer on tracks 1–7 & 10 at The Strongroom
- Streets Ahead – producer on track 2
- Dean Ross – producer on tracks 8–9
- Sweet Paulino – producer on tracks 8–9
- Jim Abyss – recording on track 8 at Metropolis Studios, mix engineer on track 1 at Olympic Studios
- Ren Swan – recording on track 9 at Sarm East Studios
- Gregg Jackman – mix engineer on tracks 2–10 at Sarm West Studios

== Charts ==
Chart (1992)	Peak position
Germany (GfK Entertainment Charts)	97
UK (Official Charts Company)	62
