= Don't Leave Me Now =

Don't Leave Me Now may refer to:

- "Don't Leave Me Now" (Pink Floyd song), 1979
- "Don't Leave Me Now", a song by Elvis Presley from Loving You, 1957
- "Don't Leave Me Now", a song by Supertramp from ...Famous Last Words..., 1982
- "Don't Leave Me Now", a song by Lost Frequencies featuring Mathieu Koss from Cup of Beats, 2020
- "Abhi Na Jaao Chhod Kar" (lit. 'Don't Leave Me Now'), a song by Jaidev, Mohammed Rafi and Asha Bhosle from the 1961 Indian film Hum Dono

== See also ==
- Don't Leave Me (disambiguation)
