= Brit Awards 1991 =

British music awards ceremony

- Date: 10 February 1991
- Venue: Dominion Theatre
- Hosted by: Simon Bates
- Most awards: The Beautiful South, Betty Boo, Chris Thomas, The Cure, Depeche Mode, Elton John, George Michael, INXS, Lisa Stansfield, MC Hammer, Michael Hutchence, Sinéad O'Connor, Status Quo, Zubin Mehta (Once)
- Most nominations: George Michael (4)

Television/radio coverage
- Network: BBC

Brit Awards 1991 was the 11th edition of the Brit Awards, an annual pop music awards ceremony in the United Kingdom. It was organised by the British Phonographic Industry and took place on 10 February 1991 at Dominion Theatre in London. It was produced by Jonathan King.

== Performances ==
- Adamski with Seal – "Killer"
- The Beautiful South – "A Little Time"
- Betty Boo – "Where Are You Baby?"
- The Cure – "Never Enough"
- EMF – "Unbelievable"
- Status Quo – Medley of Hits "Caroline"/ "Down Down"/ "Whatever You Want"/ "Rockin' All Over The World"

== Winners and nominees ==
British Album of the Year (presented by Robin Gibb)	British Producer of the Year (presented by Kim Appleby)
George Michael – Listen Without Prejudice Vol. 1; Elton John – Sleeping with the Past; Lisa Stansfield – Affection; Prefab Sprout – Jordan: The Comeback; The Beautiful South – Choke; Van Morrison – Enlightenment	Chris Thomas; George Michael; Nellee Hooper; Paul Oakenfold and Steve Osborne; Youth
British Single of the Year (presented by Simon Mayo)	British Video of the Year (presented by Phillip Schofield and Simon Le Bon)
Depeche Mode – "Enjoy the Silence"	The Beautiful South – "A Little Time"; Adamski featuring Seal – "Killer"; The Beloved – "Hello"; Betty Boo – "Where Are You Baby?"; Billy Idol – "Cradle of Love"; Depeche Mode – "Enjoy the Silence"; George Michael – "Freedom! '90"; Go West – "King of Wishful Thinking"; Seal – "Crazy"; The Cure – "Close to Me"
British Male Solo Artist (presented by Kim Appleby)	British Female Solo Artist (presented by Annie Lennox)
Elton John; George Michael; Jimmy Somerville; Phil Collins; Robert Smith; Van Morrison	Lisa Stansfield; Betty Boo; Caron Wheeler; Dusty Springfield; Elizabeth Fraser
British Group (presented by Roger Daltrey)	British Breakthrough Act (presented by Jimmy Somerville)
The Cure; Happy Mondays; Soul II Soul; Talk Talk; The Beautiful South; The Stone Roses	Betty Boo; Beats International; Happy Mondays; The Charlatans; The La's
International Male Solo Artist (presented by Rick Astley)	International Female Solo Artist (presented by Paul Jones (singer))
Michael Hutchence; Jon Bon Jovi; MC Hammer; Paul Simon; Prince	Sinéad O'Connor; Janet Jackson; Madonna; Mariah Carey; Neneh Cherry; Tina Turner; Whitney Houston
International Group (presented by Shakin' Stevens)	International Breakthrough Act (presented by Chris Rea)
INXS; B-52s; De La Soul; Faith No More; Roxette	MC Hammer; Deee-Lite; Maria McKee; Mariah Carey; Wilson Phillips
Classical Recording (presented by Chris Isaak)	Soundtrack/Cast Recording (presented by Rick Astley)
Zubin Mehta; John Eliot Gardiner; Kent Nagano; Matthew Best; Oliver Knussen	Twin Peaks; Days of Thunder; Ghost; Pretty Woman; Wild at Heart

=== Outstanding Contribution to Music ===
- Status Quo

== Multiple nominations and awards ==
The following artists received multiple awards and/or nominations.

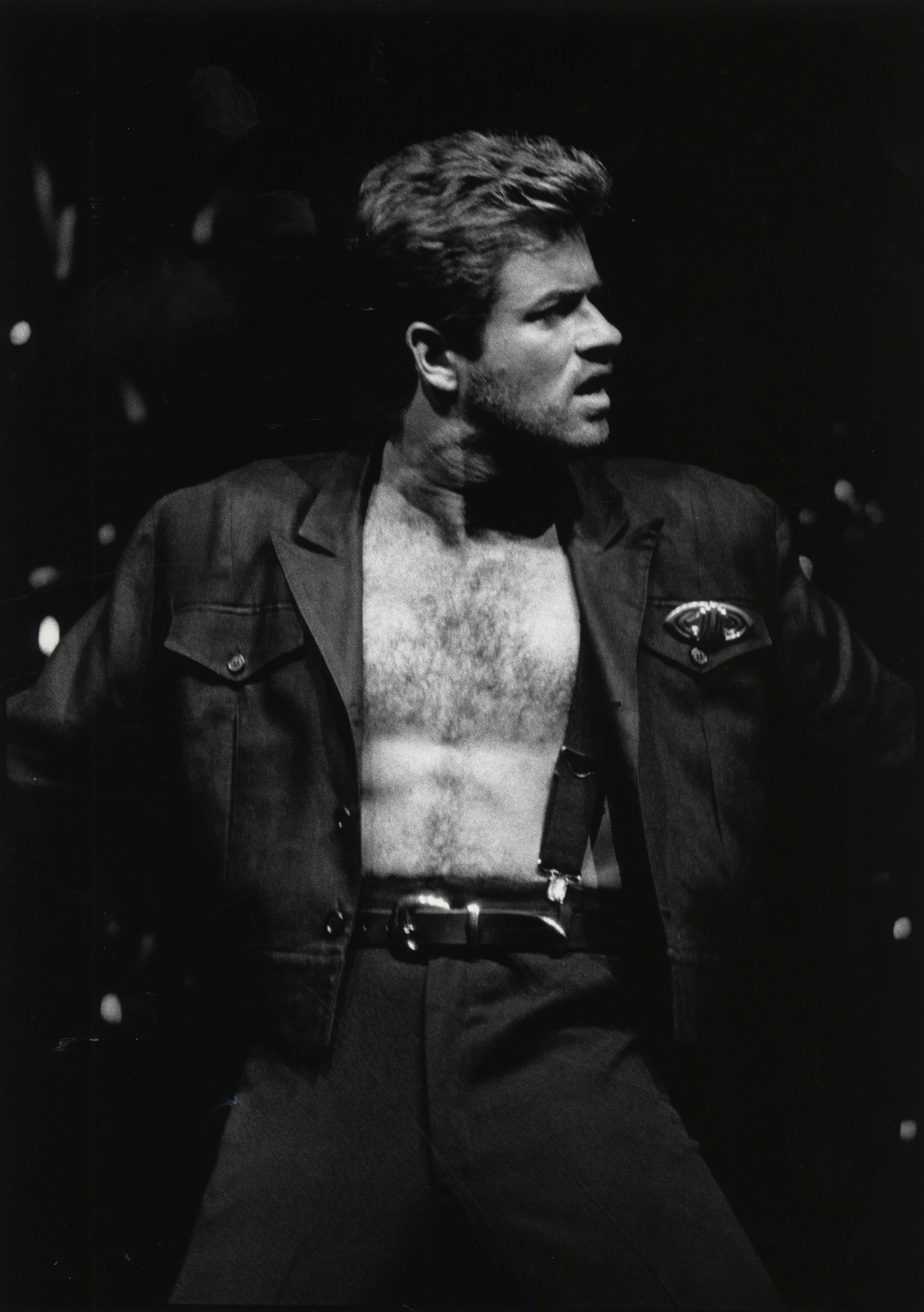
British Album of the Year winner George Michael

Artists that received multiple nominations
Nominations	Artist
4	George Michael
3	The Beautiful South
3	Betty Boo
2	The Cure
2	Depeche Mode
2	Elton John
2	Happy Mondays
2	Lisa Stansfield
2	Mariah Carey
2	MC Hammer
2	Seal
2	Van Morrison
