= Don't Leave =

Don't Leave may refer to:

- "Don't Leave" (Faithless song), 1996
- "Don't Leave" (Snakehips and MØ song), 2017
- "Don't Leave", a song by Giveon from the 2025 album Beloved
- "Don't Leave", a song by Above & Beyond from the 2019 album Flow State
- "Don't Leave", a song by Seven Lions and Ellie Goulding from the 2014 EP Worlds Apart

== See also ==
- Don't Go (disambiguation)
- Don't Leave Me (disambiguation)
- Don't Leave Me Alone (disambiguation)
- I Don't Wanna Leave (disambiguation)
