= Leave Me Lonely =

Leave Me Lonely may refer to:

- "Leave Me Lonely" (Gary Morris song), 1986
- "Leave Me Lonely" (Hilltop Hoods song), 2018
- "Leave Me Lonely", a song by Ariana Grande from Dangerous Woman, 2016
- "Leave Me Lonely", a song by Imelda May from Life Love Flesh Blood, 2017

== See also ==
- "Don't Leave Me Lonely", a 1983 song by Bryan Adams
- Leave Me Alone (disambiguation)
