= Don't Leave Me =

Don't Leave Me may refer to:

== Books, film and TV ==
- Don't Leave Me, the English title of Ne m'abandonne pas, a 2016 French TV movie
- Don't Leave Me (novel) (Ikke forlat meg; 2009), by Stig Sæterbakken
- Don't Leave Me (TV series) (Non Mi Lasciare; 2022), an Italian TV series starring Vittoria Puccini

== Songs ==
- "Don't Leave Me", a 1959 song by Ricky Nelson from Songs by Ricky
- "Don't Leave Me", a 1968 song by Harry Nilsson from Aerial Ballet
- "Don't Leave Me", a 1969 song by Hugo Montenegro from Moog Power
- "Don't Leave Me", a 1971 song by Billy Eckstine from Stormy/Feel the Warm
- "Don't Leave Me", a 1990 song by Green Day from 39/Smooth
- "Don't Leave Me", a 1993 song by Intro from Intro
- "Don't Leave Me" (B'z song), 1994
- "Don't Leave Me" (Blackstreet song), 1997
- "Don't Leave Me", a 1999 song by Blink-182 from Enema of the State
- "Don't Leave Me", a 2002 song by the All-American Rejects from The All-American Rejects
- "Don't Leave Me", a 2006 song by Suzi Rawn from Naked
- "Don't Leave Me", a 2012 song by Nelly Furtado from The Spirit Indestructible (Deluxe)
- "Don't Leave Me (Ne Me Quitte Pas)", a 2012 song by Regina Spektor
- "Don't Leave Me", a 2016 song by Moby and the Void Pacific Choir from These Systems Are Failing
- "Don't Leave Me" (BTS song), 2018
- "Don't Leave Me", a 2021 song by Kodak Black from Haitian Boy Kodak
- "Don't Leave Me", a 2021 song by the Kid Laroi from F*ck Love 3: Over You

== See also ==
- Don't Leave (disambiguation)
- Don't Leave Me Alone (disambiguation)
- Don't Leave Me Now (disambiguation)
