= X-Stream Network =

The X-Stream Network was the first free Internet service provider (ISP) based in Britain launched in 1998 and founded by Canadian businessmen Christopher Sukornyk and Gregory Sukornyk, founder of Project Breakout and Wippit founder Paul Myers.

The company were the first to offer free internet access from March 8, 1998 and then "unmetered" access through 0800 numbers. The X-Stream network was usually accessed via an 0845 number and required all users to install their bespoke dialler software, which ran independently of the browser and displayed an advertising banner above the windows start menu at all times while the user was connected. As this was a source of revenue in a market where all other ISPs charged a monthly subscription fee on top of the call costs, it was not possible to remove the X-Stream banner whilst the user is connected, although the banner was buggy and at times would crash leaving the connection active. The X-Stream banner was visible even when all other windows were maximised. Trial periods were set up mainly at evenings and weekends to allow 0800 access to the X-Stream network for 1 hour periods. This is the first instance of the development of "unmetered" access to the Internet in the UK. The X-Stream user base increased significantly after the launch of Freeserve.

The company subsequently expanded its operations to a number of other 5 European countries and Japan. X-Stream was bought by the French ISP LibertySurf in March 2000 for $75.3MM.
