= Paul Myers (music producer) =

- Born: 1967 (age 58–59); Plaistow, London, England
- Occupations: Author, businessman, record producer, DJ
- Years active: 1980s–present

Paul Myers (born 1967 in Plaistow, London, England) is a British author and businessman and was formerly a record producer. He was the CEO and founder of pioneering online music store Wippit. Myers now heads application developer Bappz and independent podcast production company Playback Media.

== Music industry ==
During the 1980s, Myers was a club DJ, and was resident at the Hippodrome in London at the age of 18. From 1989 to 1995 he was a songwriter and record producer working for Polydor Records, Warner Brothers Recordings, Rhythm King Records, and Sony Music. He contributed to the movie soundtrack to A Rage in Harlem. In 1991 he was awarded a platinum disc for his production work on the Betty Boo's album Boomania including the single 24 Hours which was also written and co-vocaled by Myers. His songs have been remixed and produced by Fat Boy Slim, William Orbit, Vince Clarke and David Morales.

== Internet businesses ==
Among his early Internet ventures from 1994 were the web design agency Nethead and the search portal G.O.D.

In 1998 he launched a free Internet access company, The X-Stream Network, the first Free ISP in the UK. This company is now part of TalkTalk following the sale of X-Stream to French owned LibertySurf for $75m in 2000.

In 2000, he founded Wippit, a legal P2P music subscription service and created online music stores for Associated Newspapers, Express Newspapers and EasyGroup. Wippit was the biggest UK-based MP3 online music and movies store and in terms of sales became the second biggest digital media service, after the UK branch of the iTunes Music Store. From 15 March 2007 Wippit produced "The All Day Breakfast Show", a podcast by award-winning radio presenter Danny Baker described in The Guardian newspaper as the 'Future of Radio' as well as Sports related podcasts including The Spurs Show, Stop! Hammer Time, Baker and Kelly and specials for comedian Tim Vine and BBC Radio 2 celebrity gardener Terry Walton.

The New York Times said of Myers, "Whether you see Myers as a marketing maestro or madman, he is still a pioneer in the digital music market" when Wippit announced the arrival of The Beatles downloads following a deal with ITN.

Myers left the business in January 2008 and Wippit closed in September of the same year. Although the company made no claim in its closing statement, media commentators concluded that the music industry never fully co-operated with Wippit or supported it the way it should have.

In May 2008 it was announced that Myers was behind BAPPZ, a company building Facebook and iPhone applications for clients such as Betfair and mothercare and the popular London Tube Map.

Myers continues to produce podcasts with his company, Playback Media producing podcasts for Alan Davies, Phil Cornwell, Mark Webster, Dermot O'Leary and Phil Daniels on their comedic football shows. It's Up For Grabs Now was the highest charting football club specific podcast on iTunes since launch in November 2009.

Bappz developed the iOS app for Air Studios, the London recording studio founded by The Beatles producer George Martin. In September 2012 AirVinyl charted Number 1 on the iTunes App Store in thirty four countries.

== Media ==
In 2006, Myers was nominated for a Netimperative Lifetime Achievement Award. He was a board advisor to UK social networking service, ProfileHeaven and more recently the creator of the Facebook application FriendFolio. He is the author of a travel memoir, What I Did in Cuba. first published in 2007.
