= Leave Me Alone =

Leave Me Alone may refer to:

== Film and television ==
- Leave Me Alone (film), a 2004 Hong Kong film directed by Danny Pang
- "Leave Me Alone" (Girls), a 2012 TV episode

== Literature ==
- Leave Me Alone!, a 2016 picture book by Vera Brosgol
- Leave Me Alone, a 1957 novel by David Karp
- Leave Me Alone: A Novel of Chengdu, a novel by Murong Xuecun

== Music ==
=== Albums ===
- Leave Me Alone (Hinds album), 2016
- Leave Me Alone (Nick Oliveri album) or the title track, 2014
- Leave Me Alone, an EP by S.O.B., 1986

=== Songs ===
- "Leave Me Alone" (Alexander Rybak song), 2012
- "Leave Me Alone" (Flipp Dinero song), 2018
- "Leave Me Alone" (I Dont Know How but They Found Me song), 2020
- "Leave Me Alone" (Jerry Cantrell song), 1996
- "Leave Me Alone" (Michael Jackson song), 1989
- "Leave Me Alone" (NF song), 2019
- "Leave Me Alone" (Reneé Rapp song), 2025
- "Leave Me Alone" (The Veronicas song), 2006
- "Leave Me Alone" (Xu Weizhou song), 2017
- "Leave Me Alone (I'm Lonely)", by Pink, 2007
- "Leave Me Alone (Let Me Cry)", by Dicky Doo & the Don'ts, 1958
- "Leave Me Alone (Ruby Red Dress)", by Helen Reddy, 1973
- "Oildale (Leave Me Alone)", by Korn, 2010
- "Leavemealone", by Baby Keem and Fred Again, 2023
- "Leave Me Alone", by Betty Boo from Boomania, 1990
- "Leave Me Alone", by the Corrs from Forgiven, Not Forgotten, 1995
- "Leave Me Alone", by Extreme from Waiting for the Punchline, 1995
- "Leave Me Alone", by Graham Coxon from The Golden D, 2000
- "Leave Me Alone", by Hanna Pakarinen representing Finland in the Eurovision Song Contest 2007
- "Leave Me Alone", by Killing Heidi, B-side of the single "Mascara", 1999
- "Leave Me Alone", by Natalie Imbruglia from Left of the Middle, 1997
- "Leave Me Alone", by New Order from Power, Corruption & Lies, 1983
- "Leave Me Alone", by Santana from Santana IV, 2016
- "Leave Me Alone", by Stefanie Sun from Yan Zi, 2000
- "Leave Me Alone", by Tech N9ne from K.O.D., 2009

== See also ==
- "Leave Em Alone", a 2019 song by Layton Greene and Lil Baby
