= Boomerang (Betty Boo album) =

Studio album by Betty Boo
- Released: 14 October 2022
- Length: 71:20
- Label: Betty Boo Records
- Producer: Betty Boo, Gavin Goldberg, Andy Wright

Betty Boo chronology
Doin' the Do: The Best of Betty Boo (1999)	Boomerang (2022)

Singles from Boomerang
- 1. "Get Me to the Weekend" Released: 23 January 2022; 2. "Shining Star" Released: May 2022; 3. "Boomerang" Released: June 2022; 4. "Right By Your Side" Released: July 2022; 5. "Miracle" Released: 2 September 2022

Boomerang is the third album by Betty Boo, self-released on 14 October 2022. It was announced on 29 June 2022. The album peaked at number 45 on the UK Albums Chart.

== Reception ==
Professional ratings
Review scores
Source	Rating
Retro Pop Magazine	5/5 stars
Slant Magazine	3/5 stars
The Times	4/5 stars

Retro Pop Magazine wrote that "Betty Boo doesn't miss a beat as she bounces back with Boomerang", elaborating: "It's a nod to the past that touches on Betty Boo's career beginnings while placing her sound firmly in 2022, with an overarching sense of nostalgia that's in line with current chart trends."

Sal Cinquemani of Slant Magazine felt that "While it's adeptly produced and mixed, Boomerang lacks the bite of Clarkson's underrated debut, Boomania, whose cartoonish pop-rap was shrewdly tempered by sleek, unassuming house tracks."

== Track listing ==
1. "Get Me to the Weekend" – 3:18
2. "Shining Star" – 3:18
3. "Miracle" (featuring Chuck D) – 3:34
4. "Right by Your Side" (featuring David Gray) – 3:09
5. "Boomerang" – 2:45
6. "Nobody Can Bring Me Down" – 3:10
7. "Stop Your Nonsense (Bubblegum Pop!)" – 3:26
8. "Never Too Late" – 3:50
9. "All I Wanna Do Is Dance" – 3:26
10. "808" – 2:24
11. "Superstar" – 3:28
12. "Hell Yeah" – 3:19

CD and digital download bonus tracks

13. "Shining Star" (featuring Sophie Ellis-Bextor) – 3:18
14. "S.O.S." – 3:40
15. "Bright Lights" – 3:26
16. "Get Me to the Weekend" (original extended mix) – 4:34
17. "Right by Your Side" (featuring David Gray; extended mix) – 5:09
18. "Miracle" (extended mix) – 5:16

Digital download bonus tracks

19. "Doin' the Do '22" – 4:06
20. "Where Are You Baby? '22" – 2:44

Digital download deluxe edition bonus tracks

13. "Get Me to the Weekend" (original extended mix) – 4:35
14. "Shining Star" (extended mix) – 5:02
15. "Miracle" (featuring Chuck D) (extended mix) – 5:16
16. "Right by Your Side" (featuring David Gray) (extended mix) – 5:09
17. "Boomerang" (extended mix) – 4:52
18. "Nobody Can Bring Me Down" (extended mix) – 5:35
19. "Stop Your Nonsense (Bubblegum Pop!)" (extended mix) – 5:15
20. "Never Too Late" (extended mix) – 5:11
21. "All I Wanna Do Is Dance" (extended mix) – 5:19
22. "808" (extended mix) – 3:54
23. "Superstar" (extended mix) – 5:37
24. "Hell Yeah" (extended mix) – 5:05
25. "Shining Star" (featuring Sophie Ellis-Bextor) – 3:19
26. "S.O.S." – 3:40
27. "Bright Lights" – 3:26
28. "Doin' the Do '22" – 4:06
29. "Where Are You Baby? '22" – 2:45

== Personnel ==
- Backing Vocals – Andy Wright (tracks: A3, A4, B5), Betty Boo, Gavin Goldberg (tracks: A4, B1), Shean Williams (tracks: B6)
- Guitar, Bass, Keyboards – Andy Wright, Gavin Goldberg
- Illustration [Cover Illustrations By] – Tom Kennedy (25)
- Layout [Design Layout] – Greg Jakobek
- Lead Vocals, Recorded By [Vocals Recorded At Home By] – Betty Boo
- Mastered By – JP
- Photography By [Photo] – Sandro Hyams
- Producer – Andy Wright, Betty Boo, Gavin Goldberg
- Producer [Assisted By] – Lewis Chapman
- Vocals – Chuck D, David Gray, Sophie Ellis-Bextor

== Charts ==
Chart performance for Boomerang
Chart (2022)	Peak position
UK Albums (OCC)	45
UK Independent Albums (OCC)	5
Scottish Albums (OCC)	19
