= Brit Award for British Breakthrough Artist =

British music award

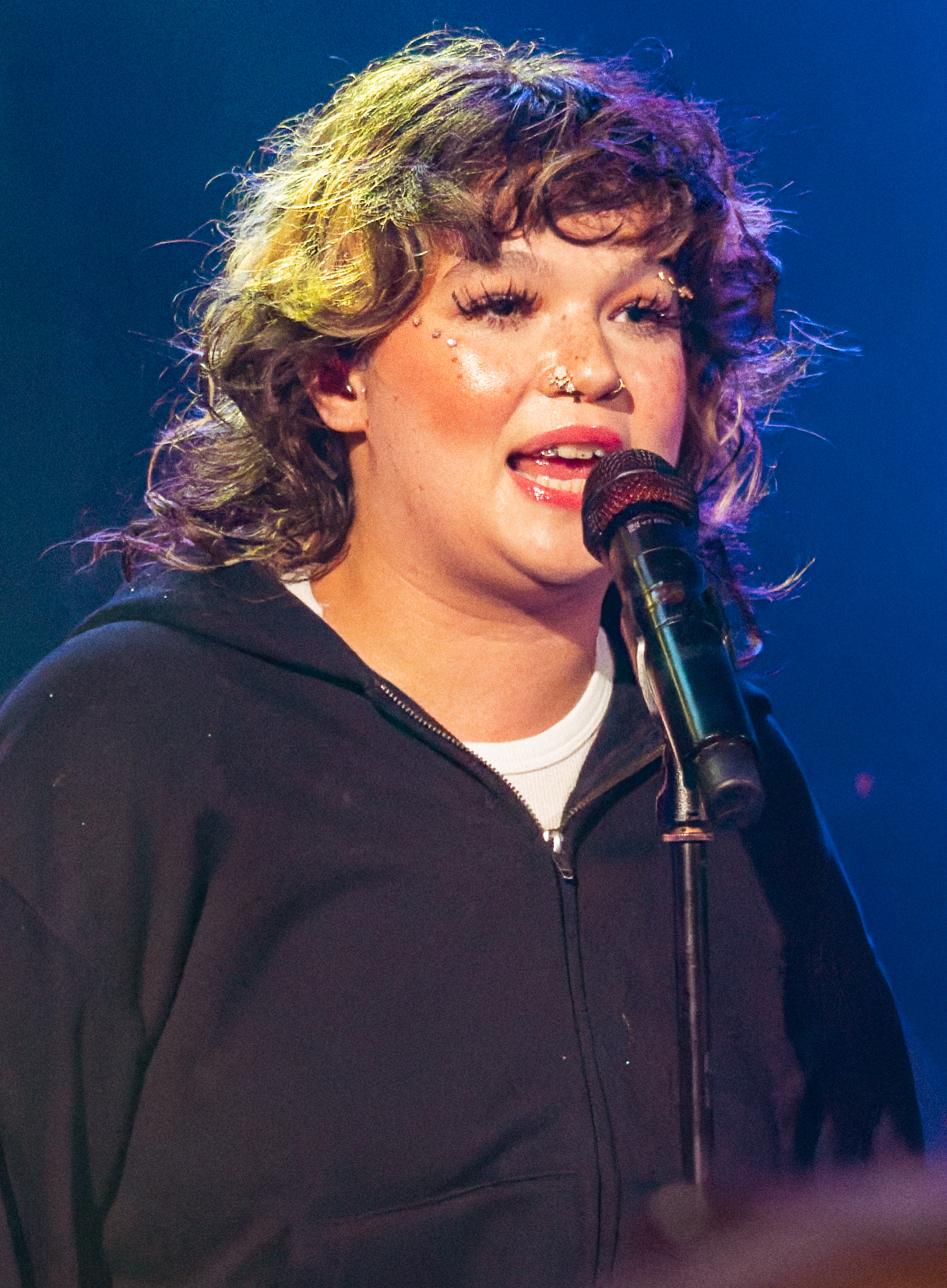
- 2026 winner Lola Young
- Country: United Kingdom (UK)
- Presented by: British Phonographic Industry (BPI)
- First award: 1977
- Currently held by: Lola Young (2025)
- Website: www.brits.co.uk

The Brit Award for British Breakthrough Artist (previously Brit Award for Best New Artist and Brit Award for British Breakthrough Act) is an award given by the British Phonographic Industry (BPI), an organisation which represents record companies and artists in the United Kingdom. The accolade is presented at the Brit Awards, an annual celebration of British and international music. The winners and nominees are determined by the Brit Awards voting academy with over 1,000 members, which comprise record labels, publishers, managers, agents, media, and previous winners and nominees.

Throughout its tenure, the category has been known by a number of different names. Originally presented as two gendered categories in 1977, the inaugural recipients were Graham Parker and Julie Covington. The Human League were the first group to win the award. Paul Young and Lisa Stansfield were the first male and female solo artists to receive the combined award, winning in 1984 and 1990 respectively. In January 2023, Sam Ryder became the first Eurovision artist to be nominated in this category. The current holder of the award is Lola Young, who won in 2026.

== History ==
The award was first presented in 1977 as two awards: British Male Newcomer and British Female Newcomer which were won by Graham Parker and Julie Covington. When the Brit Awards was held for the second time in 1982, these categories were combined and rules were changed so that groups were also eligible. The inaugural recipients of the new British Newcomer award were The Human League. From 2003 to 2019, the award was presented as British Breakthrough Act. The award received its current name Best New Artist starting in 2020, bringing it in line with similar international awards such as the Grammy Award for Best New Artist. Mabel and Dave are the only artists who have been nominated for this award more than once. Dave was nominated 2018 and 2020 and Mabel was nominated in both 2019 and 2020.

== Winners and nominees ==
=== British Male/Female Newcomer (1977) ===
Year	Recipient	Nominees
1977	Graham Parker	Heatwave (band)
1977	Julie Covington	Bonnie Tyler

=== British Newcomer (1982–2002) ===
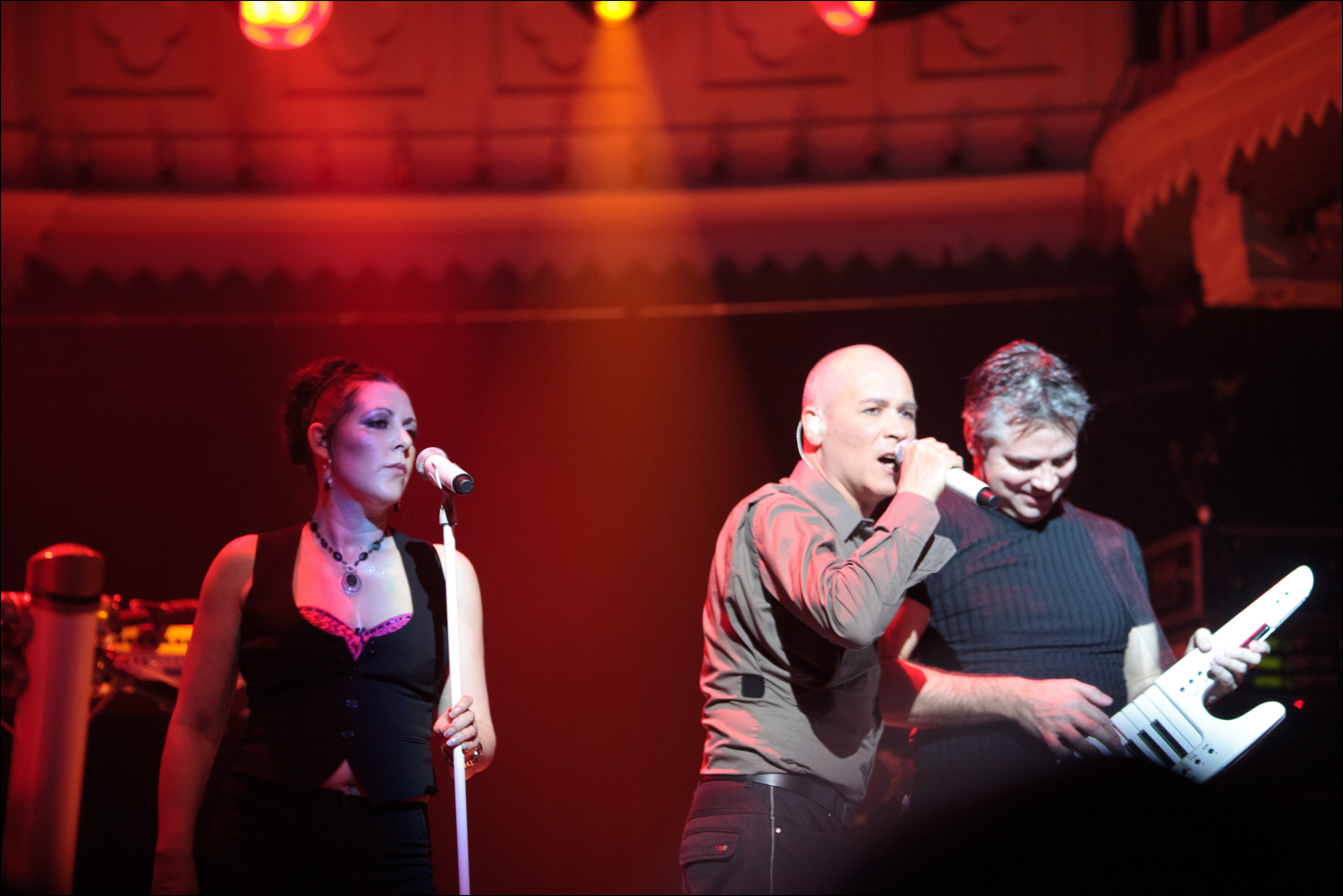
The Human League were the first winners of the combined award

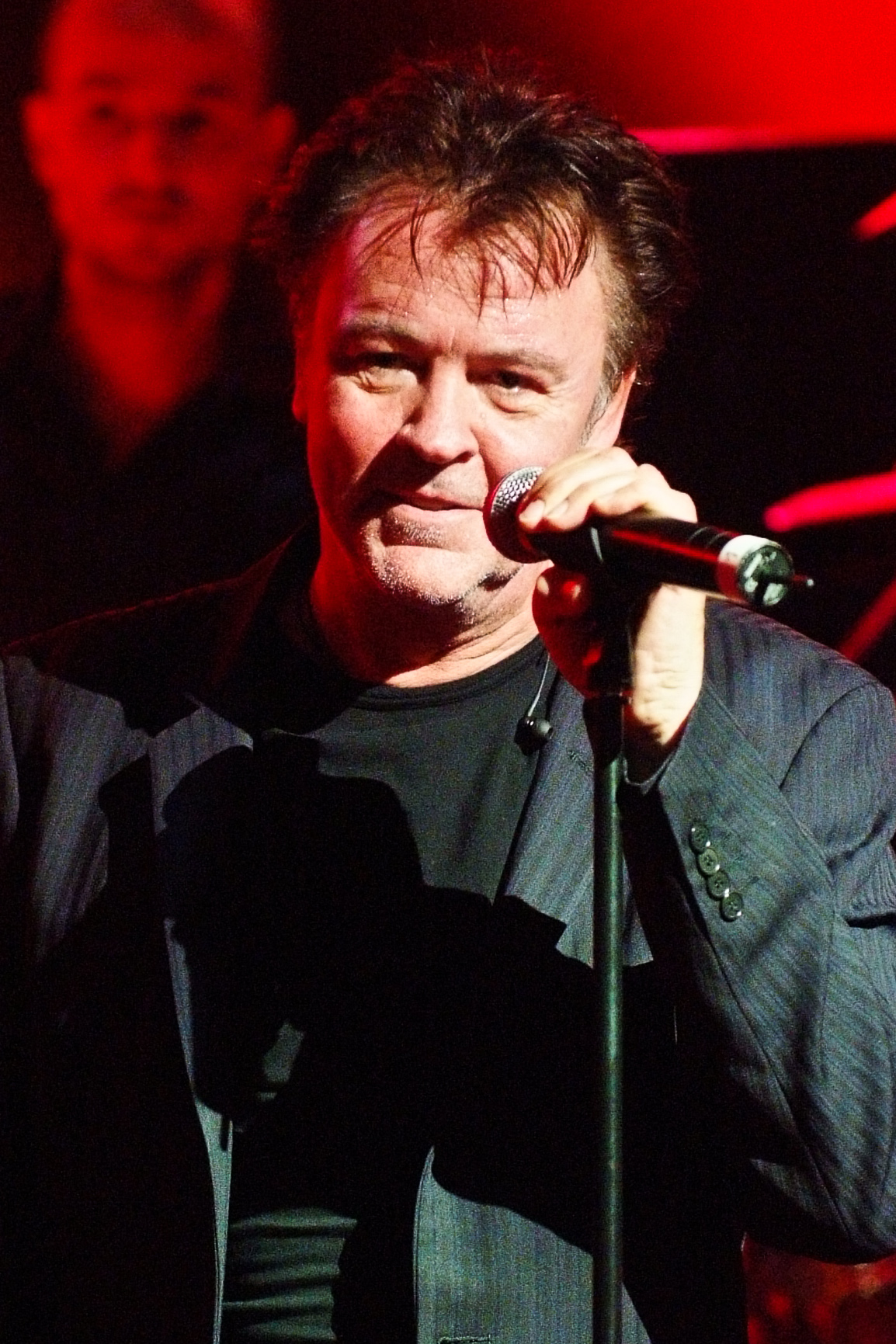
1984 recipient Paul Young

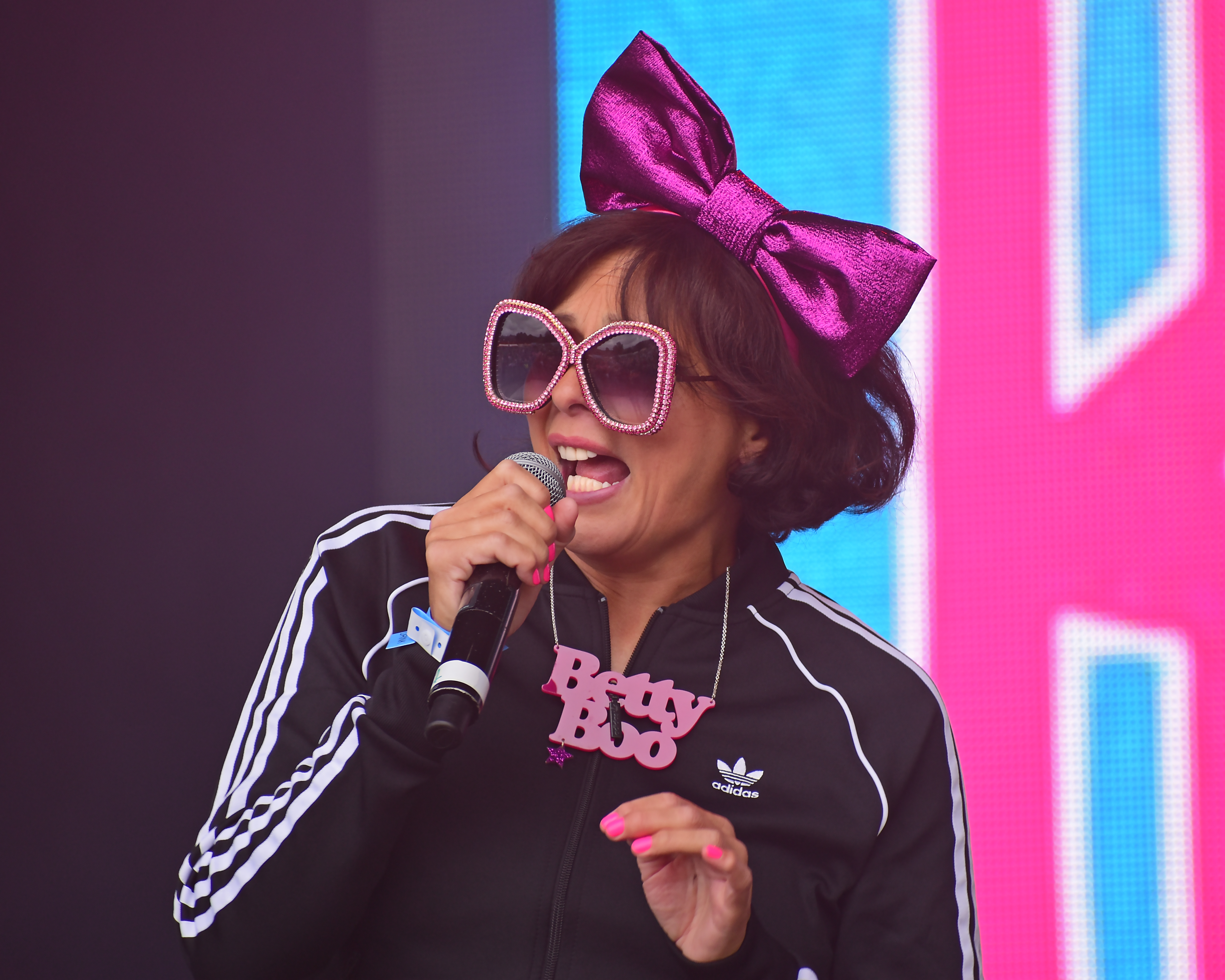
1991 winner Betty Boo

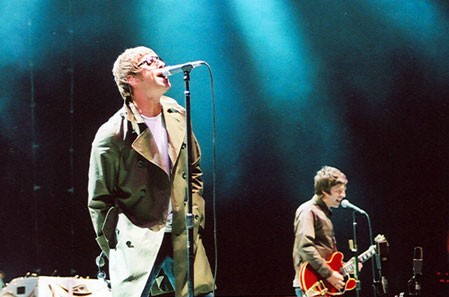
Oasis won the award in 1995

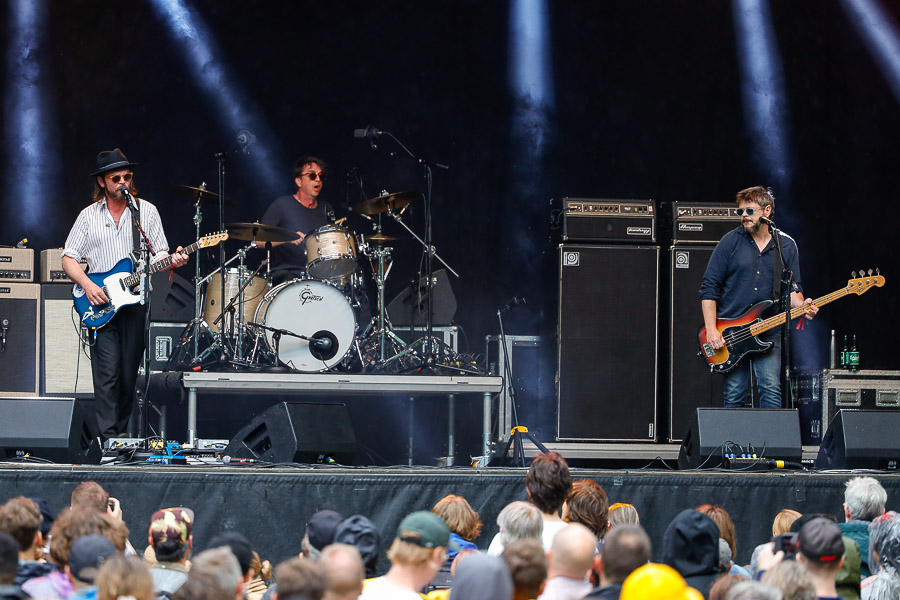
1996 winners Supergrass

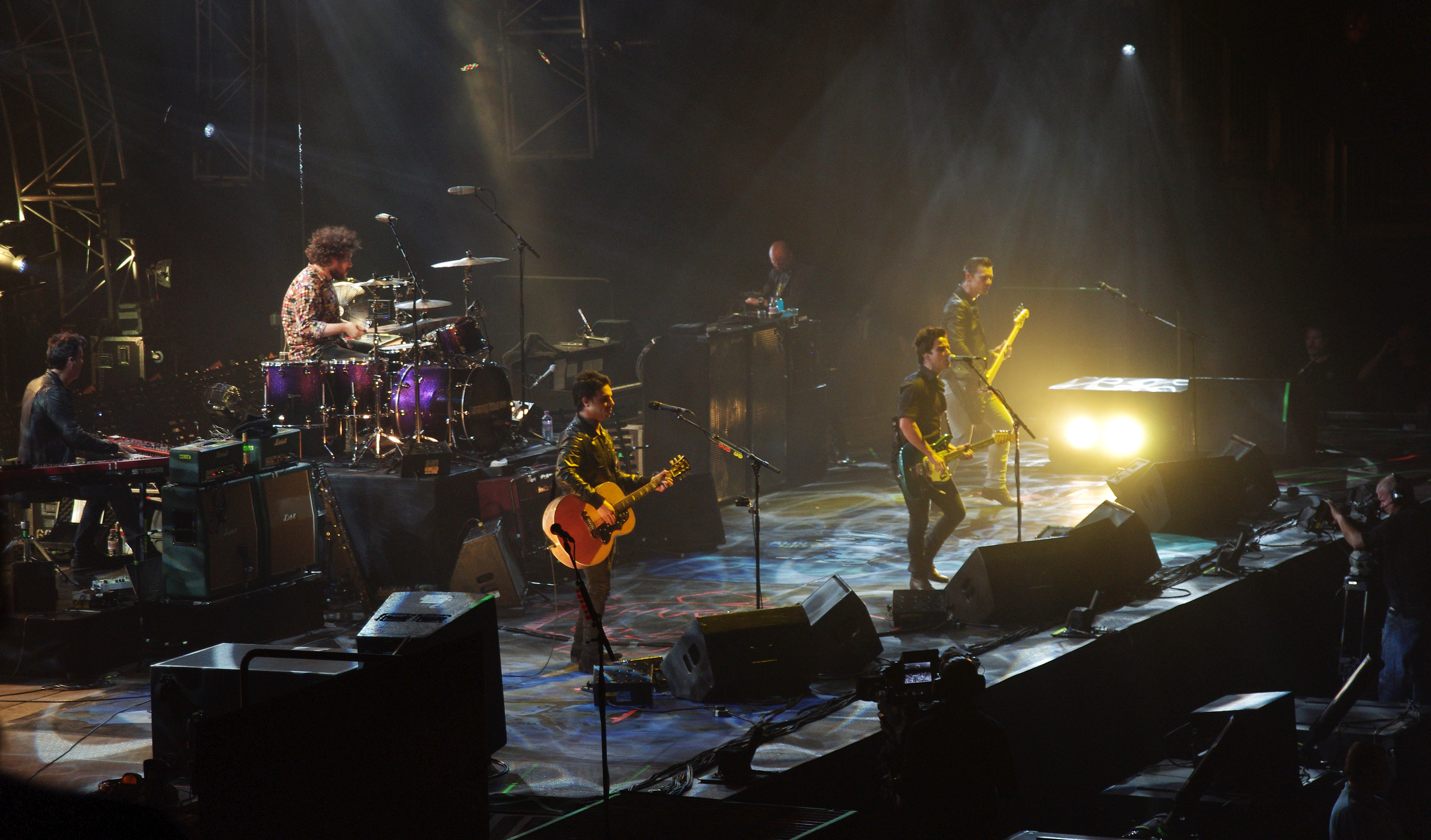
Stereophonics received the award in 1998

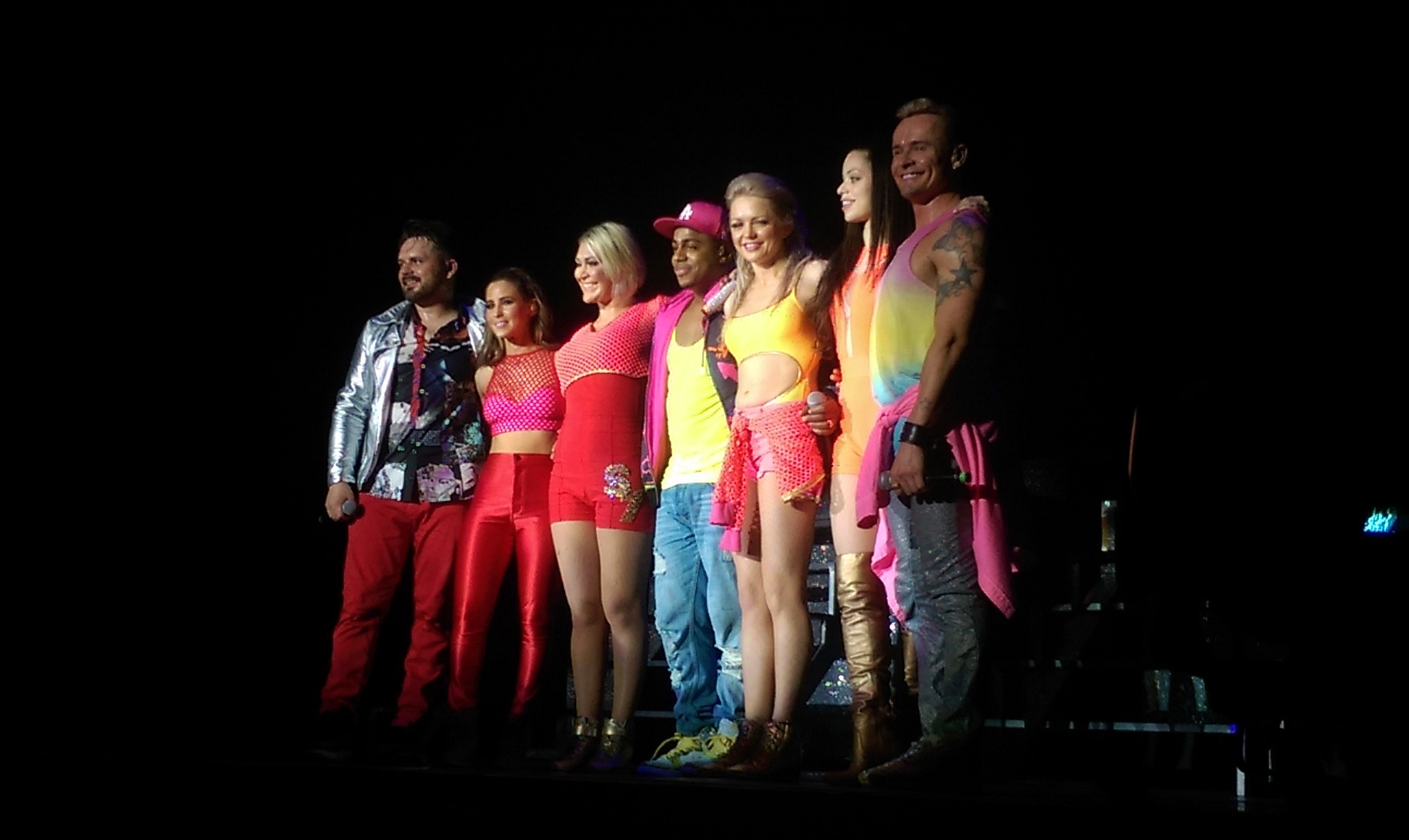
2000 winners S Club 7

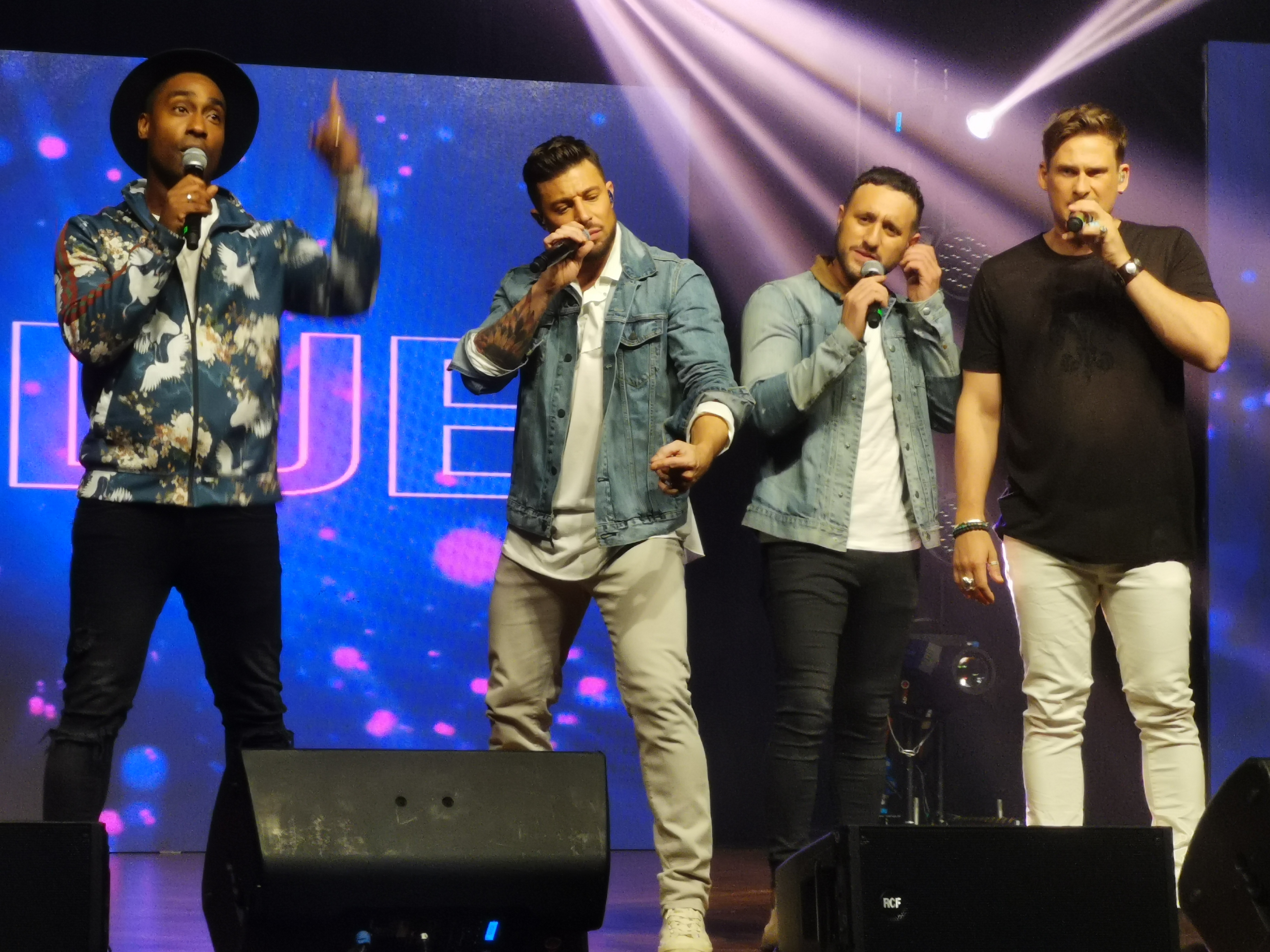
2002 winners Blue

Year	Recipient	Nominees
1982	The Human League	Depeche Mode; Linx; Soft Cell; Toyah Willcox
1983	Yazoo	ABC; Culture Club; Musical Youth
1984	Paul Young	Big Country; Howard Jones; Tracey Ullman; Wham!
1985	Frankie Goes to Hollywood	Bronski Beat; Nik Kershaw
1986	Go West	—N/a
1987	The Housemartins	—N/a
1988	Wet Wet Wet	Nominated
1988	Wet Wet Wet	Rick Astley; The Christians; Johnny Hates Jazz; T'Pau
1988	Wet Wet Wet	Eliminated
1988	Wet Wet Wet	Black; Curiosity Killed the Cat; Living in a Box; Mel and Kim; Pepsi & Shirlie; The Proclaimers; Swing Out Sister
1989	Bros	—N/a
1990	Lisa Stansfield	The Beautiful South; Shakespears Sister; Soul II Soul; The Stone Roses
1991	Betty Boo	Beats International; The Charlatans; Happy Mondays; The La's
1992	Beverley Craven	Cathy Dennis; EMF; Kenny Thomas; Seal
1993	Tasmin Archer	Dina Carroll; KWS; Take That; Undercover
1994	Gabrielle	Apache Indian; Jamiroquai; Shara Nelson; Suede
1995	Oasis	Echobelly; Eternal; PJ & Duncan; Portishead
1996	Supergrass	Black Grape; Cast; Elastica; Tricky
1997	Kula Shaker	Alisha's Attic; Ash; Babybird; The Bluetones; Lighthouse Family; Longpigs; Mansun; Mark Morrison; Skunk Anansie; Space; Spice Girls
1998	Stereophonics	All Saints; Beth Orton; Conner Reeves; Embrace; Finley Quaye; Olive; Roni Size & Reprazent; Shola Ama; Travis
1999	Belle and Sebastian	Another Level; Billie Piper; Cleopatra; Cornershop; Five; Gomez; Hinda Hicks; Propellerheads; Steps
2000	S Club 7	Groove Armada; Honeyz; Phats & Small; The Wiseguys
2001	A1	Artful Dodger; Coldplay; Craig David; Toploader
2002	Blue	Atomic Kitten; Elbow; Gorillaz; Mis-Teeq; So Solid Crew; Starsailor; Tom McRae; Turin Brakes; Zero 7

=== British Breakthrough Act (2003–2019) ===
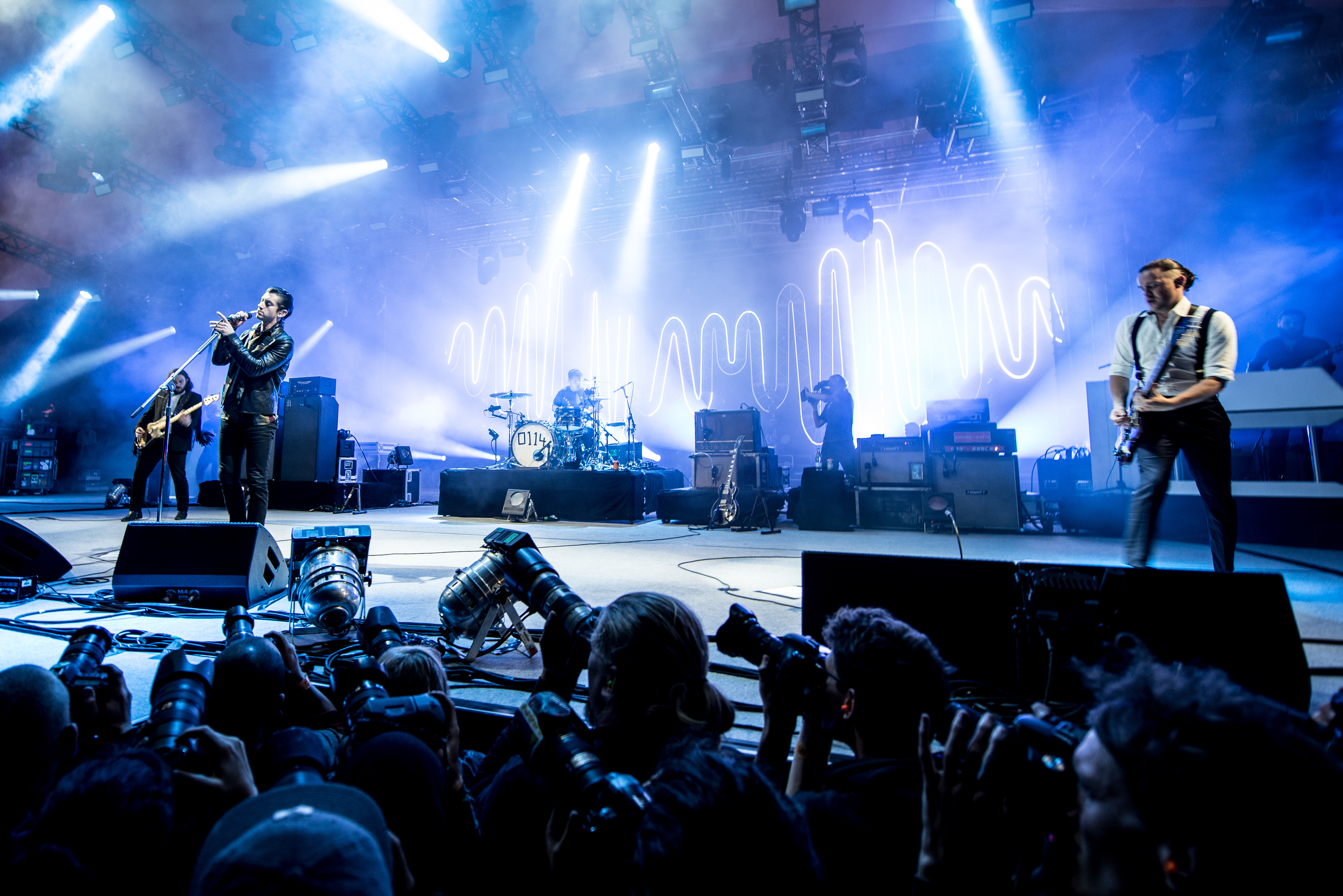
Arctic Monkeys won the award in 2006

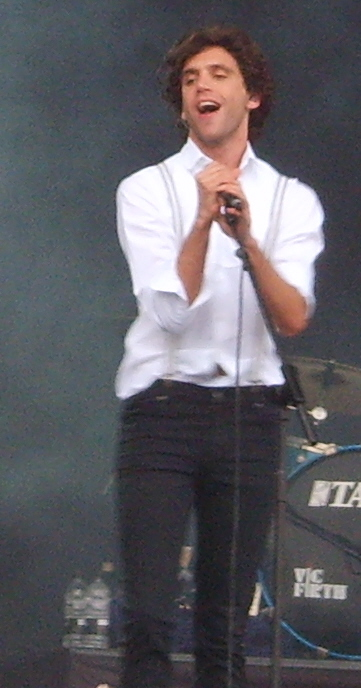
2008 winner Mika

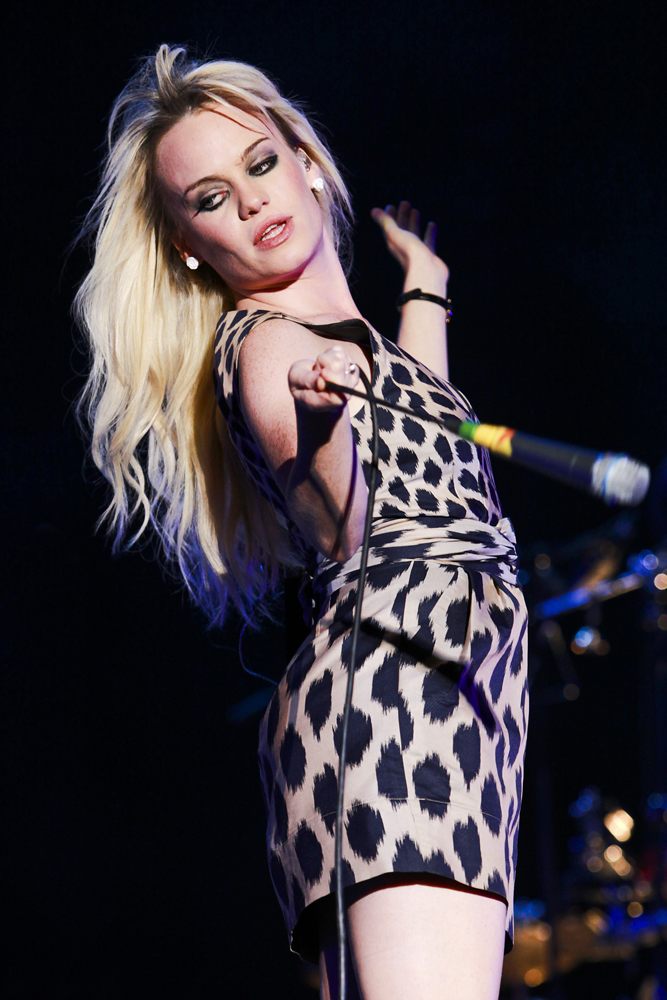
2009 winner Duffy

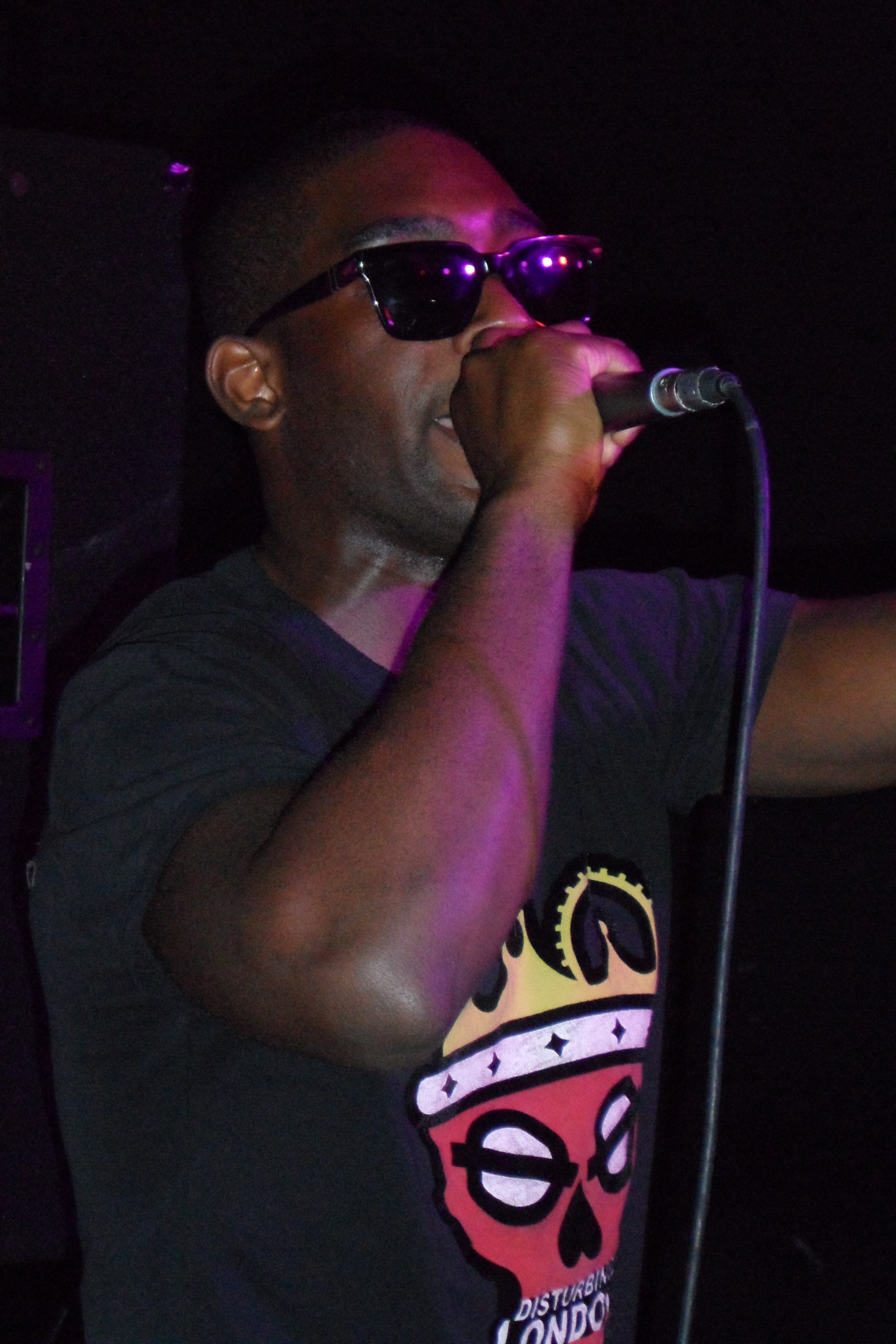
Tinie Tempah received the award in 2011

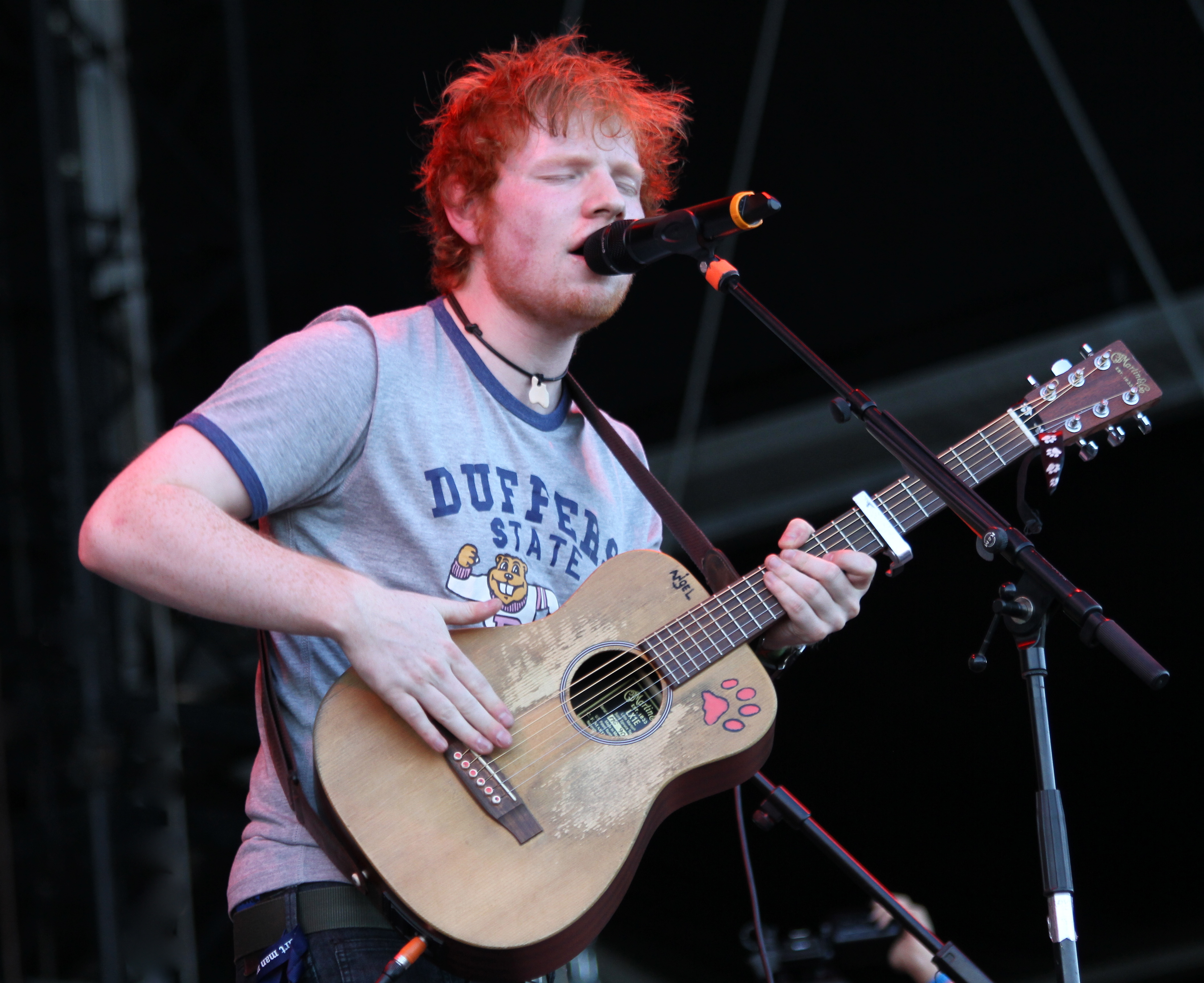
2012 winner Ed Sheeran

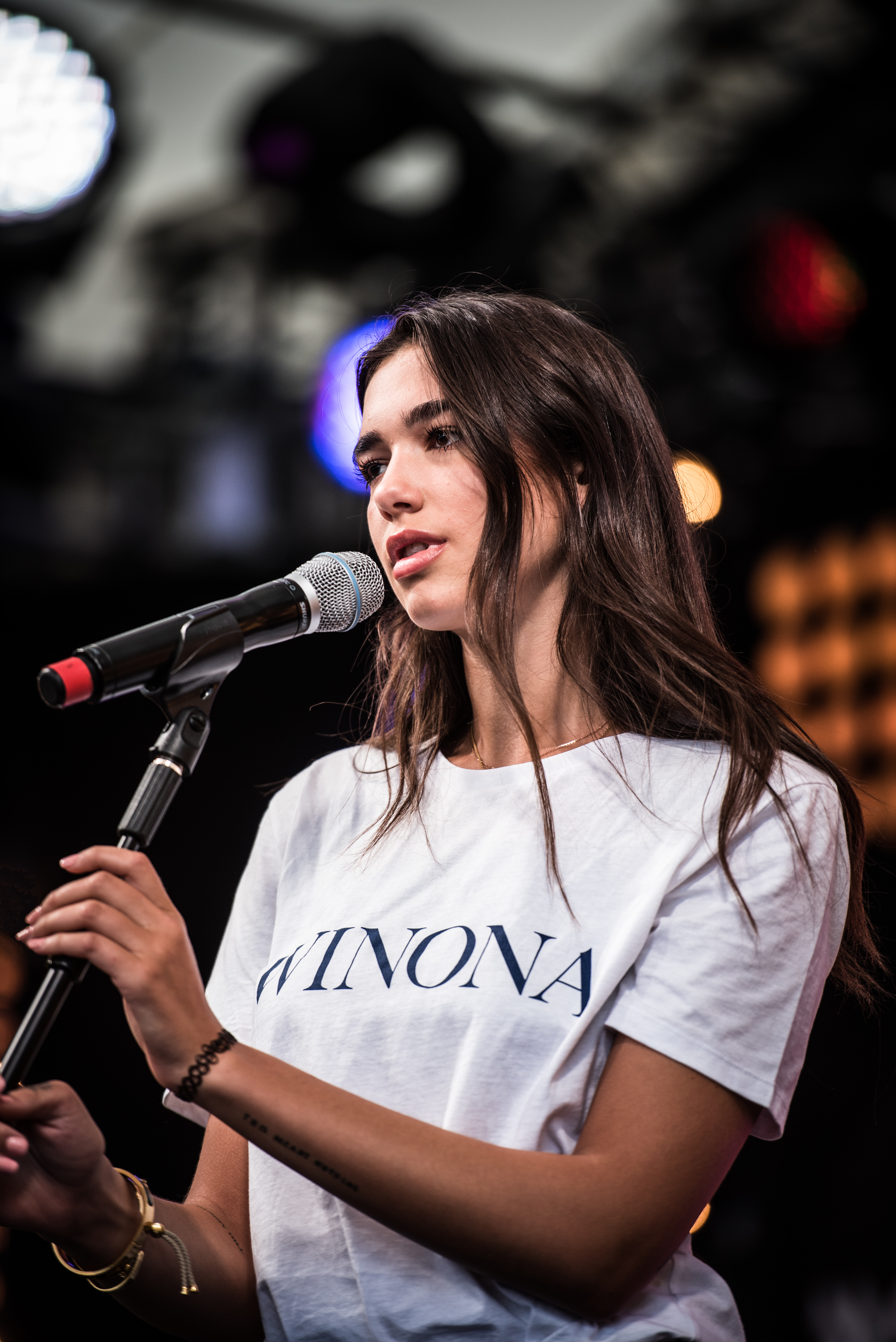
Dua Lipa won the award in 2018

Year	Recipient	Nominees
2003	Will Young	The Coral; Liberty X; Ms. Dynamite; The Streets
2004	Busted	The Darkness; Dizzee Rascal; Jamie Cullum; Lemar
2005	Keane	Franz Ferdinand; Joss Stone; Natasha Bedingfield; The Zutons
2006	Arctic Monkeys	James Blunt; Kaiser Chiefs; KT Tunstall; The Magic Numbers
2007	The Fratellis	Corinne Bailey Rae; James Morrison; The Kooks; Lily Allen
2008	Mika	Bat for Lashes; Kate Nash; Klaxons; Leona Lewis
2009	Duffy	Adele; The Last Shadow Puppets; Scouting for Girls; The Ting Tings
2010	JLS	Florence and the Machine; Friendly Fires; La Roux; Pixie Lott
2011	Tinie Tempah	Ellie Goulding; Mumford & Sons; Rumer; The xx
2012	Ed Sheeran	Anna Calvi; Emeli Sandé; Jessie J; The Vaccines
2013	Ben Howard	Alt-J; Jake Bugg; Jessie Ware; Rita Ora
2014	Bastille	Disclosure; Laura Mvula; London Grammar; Tom Odell
2015	Sam Smith	Chvrches; FKA Twigs; George Ezra; Royal Blood
2016	Catfish and the Bottlemen	James Bay; Jess Glynne; Wolf Alice; Years & Years
2017	Rag'n'Bone Man	Anne-Marie; Blossoms; Skepta; Stormzy
2018	Dua Lipa	Dave; J Hus; Loyle Carner; Sampha
2019	Tom Walker	Ella Mai; IDLES; Jorja Smith; Mabel

=== Best New Artist (2020–2025) ===
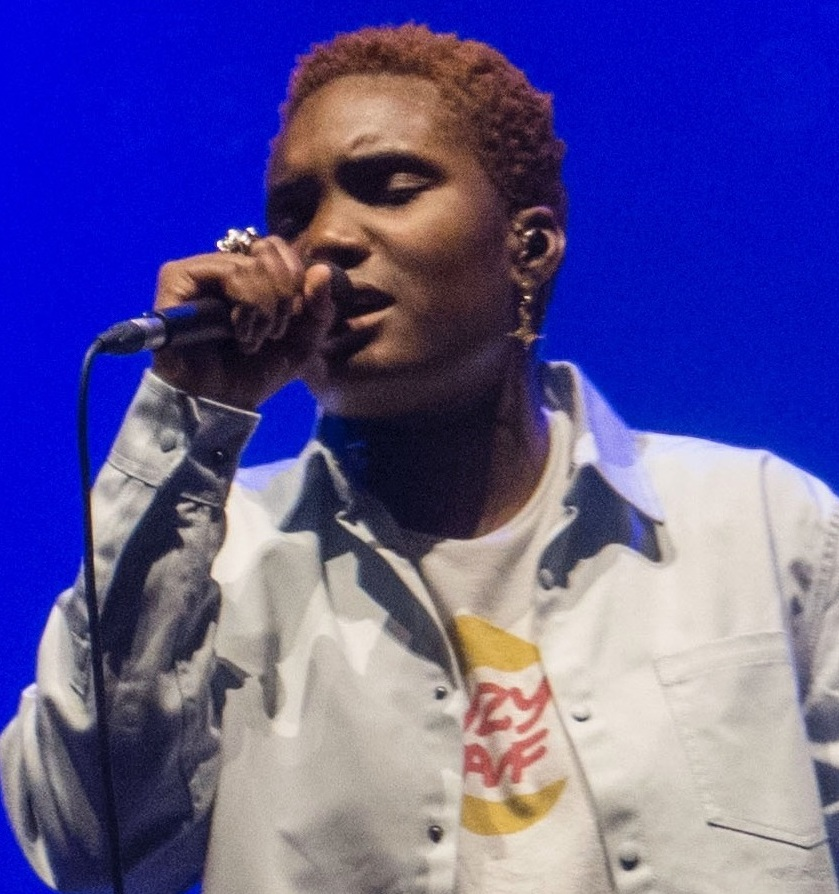
2021 award recipient Arlo Parks

Year	Recipient	Nominees
2020	Lewis Capaldi	Aitch; Dave; Mabel; Sam Fender
2021	Arlo Parks	Bicep; Celeste; Joel Corry; Young T & Bugsey
2022	Little Simz	Central Cee; Griff; Joy Crookes; Self Esteem
2023	Wet Leg	Kojey Radical; Mimi Webb; Rina Sawayama; Sam Ryder
2024	Raye	Mahalia; Olivia Dean; PinkPantheress; Yussef Dayes
2025	The Last Dinner Party	English Teacher; Ezra Collective; Myles Smith; Rachel Chinouriri

=== British Breakthrough Artist (2026–present) ===
Year	Recipient	Nominees
2026	Lola Young	Barry Can't Swim; EsDeeKid; Jim Legxacy; Skye Newman

== Notes ==
- Sam Smith (2014), Rag'n'Bone Man (2017) also won Brit Award for Rising Star
- Paul Young (1985), Ed Sheeran (2012, 2015), Ben Howard (2013) also won Brit Award for British Male Solo Artist
- Lisa Stansfield (1991–1992), Duffy (2009), Dua Lipa (2018, 2021) also won Brit Award for British Female Solo Artist
- Oasis (1996), Arctic Monkeys (2007–2008, 2014) also won Brit Award for British Group
- Blue (2003), Busted (2004) also won Brit Award for British Pop Act
