= Hum Dono (1961 film) =

- Film Poster
- Directed by: Amarjeet; Vijay Anand (ghost director)
- Based on: Uttarayan (a novel) by Tarashankar Bandyopadhyay
- Written by: Vijay Anand (screenplay and dialogue); Nirmal Sircar (adapted story)
- Story by: Tarashankar Bandyopadhyay
- Produced by: Dev Anand
- Starring: Dev Anand; Nanda; Sadhana
- Cinematography: V. Ratra
- Edited by: Dharamvir
- Music by: Jaidev
- Release date: 4 February 1961
- Country: India
- Language: Hindi

Hum Dono (transl. Us Two) is a 1961 Indian Hindi-language romantic drama film produced by Dev Anand and Navketan Films. Amarjeet (credited as Amar Jeet) is credited as the film's director, but producer and star Dev Anand claimed that his brother Vijay Anand had ghost–directed the film, based on his own script. It stars Anand in a double role, and also has Nanda, Sadhana and Leela Chitnis. The film is known for its music by Jaidev and lyrics by Sahir Ludhianvi and became a box office hit.

Hum Dono was relaunched in colour after exactly 50 years on 4 February 2011.

== Plot ==
The film is set in India during World War II. Anand is an unemployed but happy-go-lucky guy who is in love with a rich girl, Mita. Mita tells her father about Anand, and the next day Anand comes to meet him although he had to face an interview for a job. Mita's father insults Anand saying that on the one hand, he doesn't have enough money to feed Mita but he looks to be so irresponsible that instead of first facing an interview for getting an employment, he has come with a marriage proposal. Anand takes it personally and walks out. On the way back home he sees an Indian Army poster. Eager as he is to get a job, he quickly enrolls, much to the displeasure of his mother. Mita, not knowing what has happened between her father and Anand, visits his home and learns that Anand has left to serve in the Army. She tells his mother that, being her future daughter-in-law, she will stay with Anand's mother. Mita makes sure that Anand does not learn about her presence at his home and takes care of his mother.

Meanwhile, Anand gets trained and is posted in a war zone (Burma campaign). At his camp, Anand befriends Major Verma, a man who looks just like him (except that he has a moustache). With time, a bond develops between the two. The Major tells Anand about his personal life, his wife Ruma and his mother. As fate would have it, Major Verma goes missing in the war, and is presumed dead. A telegram is sent to his family saying that they are unable to trace him.

On the other hand, Anand is promoted for his heroic acts. He returns home to find Mita there and learns of his mother's death. Anand envisions what Verma's family must be going through in his absence. He decides to break the news of the Major's death personally and visits their home. Upon seeing him, the Major's mother mistakes him for her son and hugs him. Ruma too is overjoyed. Anand tells the family doctor of his true identity, but the doctor advises Anand against telling Ruma the truth since Ruma suffers from heart disease and cannot bear emotional stress. To keep Ruma happy and stress-free, Anand has no choice but to play the part of Major Verma, and starts spending more and more time at Verma's home. Mita grows unhappy about Anand's continuous absence from home. Once, when she sees him at a temple with Ruma, she concludes that he is having an affair and leaves him.

At the same time, Anand is not comfortable with being close to Ruma. This pains Ruma and she asks him why he is so distant from her, and when they would have a child. Anand replies that the war has changed him, and he would never have a child with her. However, Ruma starts to think that Major Verma no longer loves her and is having an extra-marital affair.

It is now revealed that the Major is alive, though he has lost a leg. He reaches home and finds Anand in his place. He misjudges him and believes that he is taking sexual advantage of Ruma. Major Verma ambushes Anand on a secluded street and tries to kill him. A scuffle ensues, and the attempt to shoot Anand fails. Anand explains that he is merely playing his part to keep Verma's family happy and his wife healthy. To convince the Major, Anand tells him to come to the temple the next day. He also communicates the same to Mita.

The next day, Anand comes to the temple with Ruma. As Major Verma and Mita secretly listen on, Ruma again complains to Anand about the lack of physical intimacy between them. Anand then asks her whether she would leave her husband if he were to become handicapped. Ruma's answer is an emphatic no.

At this point, the real Major Verma reveals himself and Ruma hugs him. Mita too understands the situation and reconciles with Anand. The two couples leave the temple and the film ends on a happy note.

== Cast ==
- Dev Anand in double role as Major Manohar Lal "Mani" Verma and Capt. Anand
- Nanda as Ruma Verma, Major Manohar Lal Verma's wife
- Sadhana as Mita, Capt. Anand's love interest
- Lalita Pawar as Mrs. Verma, Major Manohar Lal Verma's mother
- Leela Chitnis as Capt. Anand's mother
- Gajanan Jagirdar as Mita's father (credited as Jagirdar)
- Rashid Khan as John

== Production ==
Dev Anand had actually read Tarasankar Bandopadhyay's novel Uttarayan and bought the rights from him to make a Hindi film on it, under his home banner Navketan Films. His brother Vijay Anand wrote its screenplay, adapting the original story. Hum Dono was originally supposed to be directed by Kartik Chatterjee, who had made a big name for himself with Bengali hits like Ramer Sumati, Mahaprasthaner Pathey (Yatrik in Hindi), Saheb Bibi Golam and Chandranath. But Chatterjee left the project after Anand suggested some changes in the screen adaptation of the novel. Bandyopadhyay also left the project and gave his novel's adaptation right to Agradoot. Later, Anad hired Nirmal Sircar to write a modified version of the novel and got on board Amarjeet as director, and made Hum Dono.

== Soundtrack ==
The film's music was composed by Jaidev and song lyrics were written by Sahir Ludhianvi.

Song	Singer	Raga
"Abhi Na Jaao Chhod Kar"	Mohammed Rafi, Asha Bhosle	
"Allah Tero Naam "	Lata Mangeshkar	
"Jahan Mein Aisa Kaun Hai"	Asha Bhosle	
"Kabhi Khud Pe Kabhi Haalaat Pe Rona Aaya"	Mohammed Rafi	Gara (raga)
"Mai Zindagi Ka Saath Nibhata Chala Gaya"	Mohammed Rafi	
"Prabhu Tero Naam"	Lata Mangeshkar	Bhimpalasi

== Nominations ==
- Filmfare Nomination for Best Actor - Dev Anand
- Director Amarjeet was nominated for the Golden Bear at the 1962 Berlin International Film Festival.
