= Let Me Take You There =

1992 single by Betty Boo

Single by Betty Boo

from the album GRRR! It's Betty Boo
- B-side: "Jet Sex"
- Released: 27 July 1992
- Studio: The Strongroom (London, England)
- Genre: Dance-pop
- Length: 3:57
- Label: WEA
- Songwriters: Betty Boo; John Coxon; Charles Dawes; Carl Sigman
- Producers: Betty Boo; John Coxon

Betty Boo singles chronology
"24 Hours" (1990)	"Let Me Take You There" (1992)	"I'm on My Way" (1992)

Audio
- "Let Me Take You There" (12-inch mix) on YouTube

"Let Me Take You There" is a song by English singer-songwriter Betty Boo. She co-wrote and co-produced the song with John Coxon, and it contains a sample of the Four Tops' version of the 1958 song "It's All in the Game", so Charles Dawes and Carl Sigman are also credited as writers. Musically, the song is a dance-pop track with lyrics about daydreaming by the ocean.

"Let Me Take You There" was released as the lead single from Boo's second studio album, GRRR! It's Betty Boo (1992), on 27 July 1992 by WEA and received positive reviews from music critics, who praised Boo's stronger songwriting and sampling usage. Commercially, the single peaked at number 12 on the UK Singles Chart and reached the top 20 in Ireland and Switzerland.

== Critical reception ==
Alan Jones of British trade paper Music Week named "Let Me Take You There" as the "Pick of the Week" on 25 July 1992, calling the song a "lovely, lazy summery hit" and its composition "pretty". Later, during a review of Betty Boo's next single, I'm on My Way", the same publication noted that "Let Me Take You There" is more "stylish" than Boo's previous works. Music & Media magazine called the track an "appealingly lush dance/pop gem", while Swansea Sound head of music Rob Pendry praised the sampling of "It's All in the Game", writing that existence of Boo's version is deserved. Miranda Watson and Robbert Tilli of the same magazine noted that the song exemplifies Boo's stronger lyrics and vocals on GRRR! It's Betty Boo. Retrospectively reviewing the album, Imran Khan of PopMatters referred to "Let Me Take You There" as a "beachy, laidback groove".

== Chart performance ==
On the UK Singles Chart, "Let Me Take You There" debuted at number 30 on the week starting 2 August 1992. Three weeks later, it rose to its peak of number 12, giving Boo her third top-20 UK hit as well as her last top-40 hit as of 2026. It remained within the UK top 75 for eight weeks in total, spending three of these weeks in the top 20. The song also entered the top 20 in Ireland, reaching number 13 on the Irish Singles Chart and staying inside the top 30 for four weeks. In Europe, the single peaked at number 18 in Switzerland and entered the top 50 in Germany and Sweden. On the Eurochart Hot 100, it climbed to number 41 in September 1992. It was also a top-10 radio hit, reaching number nine on Music & Media's EHR Top 40 ranking. Outside Europe, the song charted in Australia, where it reached number 97 on the ARIA Singles Chart in October 1992.

== Track listings ==
- 7-inch, cassette, and mini-CD single
1. "Let Me Take You There" – 3:57
2. "Jet Sex" – 3:48
- 12-inch single

A1. "Let Me Take You There" (12-inch version) – 5:57
A2. "Let Me Take You There" (Ubiquity mix) – 6:07
B1. "Let Me Take You There" (Take U There mix) – 6:20
B2. "Jet Sex" (12-inch version) – 6:05

- CD single
1. "Let Me Take You There" – 3:57
2. "Let Me Take You There" (Away mix) – 6:15
3. "Let Me Take You There" (Ubiquity mix) – 6:07
4. "Jet Sex" (12-inch version) – 6:05

== Credits and personnel ==
Credits are lifted from the GRRR! It's Betty Boo album booklet.

Studios

- Recorded at The Strongroom (London, England)
- Mixed at Sarm West (London, England)

Personnel

- Betty Boo – writing, production, pre-production
- John Coxon – writing, production, pre-production
- Charles Dawes – writing ("It's All in the Game")
- Carl Sigman – writing ("It's All in the Game")
- Frank Ton Ton – drums
- Mads Bjerke – recording engineering, engineering
- Gregg Jackman – mix engineering

== Charts ==
Chart (1992)	Peak position
Australia (ARIA)	97
Europe (Eurochart Hot 100)	41
Europe Airplay (Music & Media)	9
Germany (GfK)	50
Ireland (IRMA)	13
Netherlands (Dutch Top 40 Tipparade)	14
Netherlands (Single Top 100)	61
Sweden (Sverigetopplistan)	38
Switzerland (Schweizer Hitparade)	18
UK Singles (Official Charts)	12
UK Airplay (Music Week)	9
UK Dance (Music Week)	42

== Release history ==
Region	Date	Format(s)	Label(s)	Ref.
United Kingdom	27 July 1992	7-inch vinyl; 12-inch vinyl; CD; cassette	WEA	
Australia	31 August 1992	CD	WEA	
Australia	14 September 1992	Cassette	WEA	
Japan	28 November 1992	Mini-CD	WEA	
