= Doin' the Do =

1990 single by Betty Boo

Single by Betty Boo

from the album Boomania
- Released: 7 May 1990
- Genre: Dance-pop; pop-rap; hip house
- Length: 3:40
- Label: Warner Bros.
- Songwriters: Alison Clarkson; Robert Seidenberg; Kenny Young
- Producers: Betty Boo; King John

Betty Boo singles chronology
"Hey DJ/I Can't Dance to That Music You're Playing" / "Ska Train" (1989)	"Doin' the Do" (1990)	"Where Are You Baby?" (1990)

Music video
- "Doin' the Do" on YouTube

"Doin' the Do" is a song by English singer-songwriter Betty Boo, released in May 1990 by Warner Bros. as the second single from her debut album, Boomania (1990). The song was co-written and co-produced by Boo, reaching the top 10 in Australia, Belgium, Ireland, Luxembourg, the Netherlands, New Zealand, Spain, and the United Kingdom. Boo has stated in interviews, that the name of the song basically means 'I'm getting on and doing things'. Much later after the song was released, someone told her it was a slang expression for cunnilingus.

== Release ==
"Doin the Do" was Boo's debut solo single, and second overall release, following her collaboration with the Beatmasters on their song "Hey DJ/I Can't Dance (To That Music You're Playing)" in 1989. The song samples portions of the 1968 single "Captain of Your Ship" by the American girl group Reparata and the Delrons and "I'm a Believer" by the Monkees.

The single charted at number seven in the UK and also reached number three in Australia. In the US, "Doin' the Do" went to number one on the dance chart and also crossed over to the Billboard Hot 100 chart, where it peaked at 90 in November 1990.

An authorised remix of the song was created for the opening credits of the Bitmap Brothers game, Magic Pockets.

== Critical reception ==
Alex Henderson from AllMusic said that "melodic, escapist club hits", like "Doin' the Do", "have a lot more bite and substance than the music of Vanilla Ice and Icy Blu." Larry Flick from Billboard magazine remarked that this hip-house jam has been buzzing along the club underground as an import for a while now, "thanks to Boo's amusing rhyming and tune's brain-imbedding chorus. Pop-spiced remixes by Pettibone should add to crossover radio incentive. Do it up." A reviewer from Cashbox stated that "this combination of dance grooves and silliness works very well".

Dave Sholin from the Gavin Report commented, "First heard about this entry a few months ago when it was the rage in England. The "Booster" is Top Three in the U.K. with her follow-up track while this clever and catchy rap 'n pop combo is set to make an explosive debut Stateside. Song and video scream FUN!" David Giles from Music Week wrote that Boo "kicks off her solo career with a twangy rap, cute backing noises and a hook-laden production from former benefactors The Beatmasters. Rhythm King must be counting on this one and it's certainly crossed far enough over to be a large hit." Gene Sandbloom from The Network Forty said that somewhere between Diana Rigg and Pebbles, "this 19-year-old from Britain enrolled in sound engineering school so she could produce records her own way." David Quantick from NME felt that "Doin' the Do" "is a sparky sort of thing whose rhythm endearingly suggests the bit on the Chart Show where the runaway train goes over the hill, choo choo." In 2012, the Official UK Chart named the song a "pop gem" and inducted it into its "Pop Gem Hall of Fame".

== Charts ==
=== Weekly charts ===
Chart (1990)	Peak position
Australia (ARIA)	3
Belgium (Ultratop 50 Flanders)	8
Canada Dance/Urban (RPM)	2
Europe (Eurochart Hot 100)	20
Ireland (IRMA)	9
Israel (Israeli Singles Chart)	1
Luxembourg (Radio Luxembourg)	4
Netherlands (Dutch Top 40)	7
Netherlands (Single Top 100)	9
New Zealand (Recorded Music NZ)	4
Spain (AFYVE)	9
UK Singles (Official Charts)	7
US Billboard Hot 100	90
US Dance Club Songs (Billboard)	1
US Dance Singles Sales (Billboard)	1
US Cash Box Top 100	82

=== Year-end charts ===
Chart (1990)	Position
Australia (ARIA)	61
Canada Dance/Urban (RPM)	31
Netherlands (Dutch Top 40)	80
Netherlands (Single Top 100)	83
US 12-inch Singles Sales (Billboard)	48
US Dance Club Play (Billboard)	31

== Sales and certifications ==
Region	Certification	Certified units/sales
Australia (ARIA)	Gold	35,000^{^}
^{^} Shipments figures based on certification alone.
