= Please Don't Go =

Please Don't Go may refer to:

- "Please Don't Go" (2NE1 song), 2009
- "Please Don't Go" (Boyz II Men song), 1992
- "Please Don't Go" (Donald Peers song), a song written by Les Reed and Jackie Rae
- "Please Don't Go" (Joel Adams song), 2015
- "Please Don't Go" (KC and the Sunshine Band song), 1979
  - Covered by Basshunter on Now You're Gone – The Album, 2008
- "Please Don't Go" (KWS song), 1992
- "Please Don't Go" (Mike Posner song), 2010
- "Please Don't Go" (No Mercy song), 1997
- "Please Don't Go" (Six60 song), 2019
- "Please Don't Go" (Tank song), 2007
- "Please Don't Go", a song by Immature from We Got It, 1995
- "Please Don't Go", as ong by Nayobe, 1984
- "Please Don't Go", a song by Petula Clark from Colour My World, 1967
- "Please Don't Go", a song by the Bicycles from The Good, the Bad and the Cuddly, 2006

== See also ==
- "Plz Don't Go", a song by Cashmere Cat from 9, 2017
- "Please Don't Go Girl", a song by New Kids on the Block, 1988
- "Baby, Please Don't Go", a blues song first recorded by Big Joe Williams, 1935
