= Abhi Na Jaao Chhod Kar =

Song by Mohammed Rafi, Asha Bhosle

from the album Hum Dono
- Language: Hindi
- Released: 1961
- Recorded: 1960
- Genre: Film score
- Length: approx. 4:54
- Label: Saregama (formerly HMV)
- Composer: Jaidev
- Lyricist: Sahir Ludhianvi
- Producer: Navketan Films

"Abhi Na Jaao Chhod Kar" is a Hindi film song from the 1961 film Hum Dono. It is a romantic duet composed by Jaidev with lyrics by Sahir Ludhianvi, and sung by Mohammed Rafi and Asha Bhosle. The song was picturised on actors Dev Anand and Sadhana Shivdasani.

== Background ==
The song was featured in Hum Dono, a film produced by and starring Dev Anand. The musical score for the film was composed by Jaidev, and the lyrics were written by Sahir Ludhianvi, both of whom received acclaim for their contributions. Over time, the song came to be viewed as a significant example of romantic musical expression in Hindi cinema. The tune of "Abhi Na Jaao Chhod Kar" is reused in two other songs in the film Hum Dono: "Adhuri Aas Chhod Ke" and "Jahaan Mein Aisa Kaun Hai Ke Jissko Gham Mila Nahin".

The arrangement by Jaidev is marked by restraint, featuring minimal orchestration including guitar and flute interludes. This creates a subdued mood that emphasizes the song’s lyrical and emotional content. The vocal performances by Rafi and Bhosle are often noted for their natural, conversational tone, which complements the song’s structure and enhances its emotional resonance. The song covers the popular theme of lovers in conversation who want to spend more time with each other away from their homes, but are forced to part at the end of the day due to their responsibilities to their families.

== Structure ==
The song is framed as a conversation between two lovers, with the male character expressing a wish for the female character to stay a little longer. The female voice responds by acknowledging his affection but points out her social obligations. The exchange ultimately conveys the mutual longing between the two characters. The composition supports this conversational structure with subtle instrumentation that allows the voices to remain central. The first stanza has the male character, played by Dev Anand, requesting the female character, played by Sadhana, to stay a little longer, knowing very well that in those traditional times, it was not accepted for women to stay out late. The second stanza has a reply from the female character, who points out how late it is at night by highlighting that the stars have come out and the lights have come on. She then subtly hints for a more permanent arrangement between them. In the third stanza, the male character points out the philosophical obligation that lovers have to each other, asking her to pass this initial test of love by staying. He then apologises for speaking too much, stating that he was simply in love and wants her by his side.

=== In the film ===
The song begins with Dev Anand's character waiting for Sadhana's character, who arrives a little late. They exchange gifts, including a musical lighter that she gifts him, the tune of which becomes the signature tune of the song and the rest of the film. They thus spend the whole afternoon together in silence. The song and its lyrics only begin as the evening grows, with Dev Anand's character asking Sadhana's character to stay, while she cites her social obligations and hints at him to take action if he wants to keep her in his life permanently. At the end of the song, the lovers move hand-in-hand. In the scene that follows, he requests her father for her hand in marriage.

== Legacy ==
"Abhi Na Jaao Chhod Kar" is frequently cited among the most well-regarded romantic songs of Hindi cinema’s golden era. The song has maintained its popularity across generations and is referenced in academic and popular commentary on Indian film music.

Singer and composer Shankar Mahadevan, in a 2022 interview, stated that the song was "probably the best written song ever". Actor Shah Rukh Khan stated that the song was the most romantic song in Hindi cinema.

In 2023, the song was notably referenced in the film Rocky Aur Rani Kii Prem Kahaani, directed by Karan Johar. A scene from the film featured actors Dharmendra and Shabana Azmi performing a dialogue interspersed with the lyrics of the original track. Rather than using a full-length musical remix, the film incorporated the song as a nostalgic element within a romantic sequence. This adaptation was seen as a tribute to the original composition and reflected the continued relevance of the song in contemporary cinema.

Musical duo Sourendro-Soumyojit created a revisit version of this song as the anthem of World Music Day 2024, celebrating 100 years of Mohammed Rafi that featured artists like Ustad Amjad Ali Khan, Vishal Bhardwaj, Rekha Bhardwaj, Shankar Mahadevan, Papon, Usha Uthup, Shubha Mudgal, Aruna Sairam, Shweta Mohan, Mame Khan, Leslee Lewis, Anindya Chatterjee, Lopamudra Mitra, Arnob and the creators themselves. The post-produced video version of the song was released on social media later the same year as the first song of the album and it went viral on social media platforms.
