= Betty Boo =

English musician (born 1970)

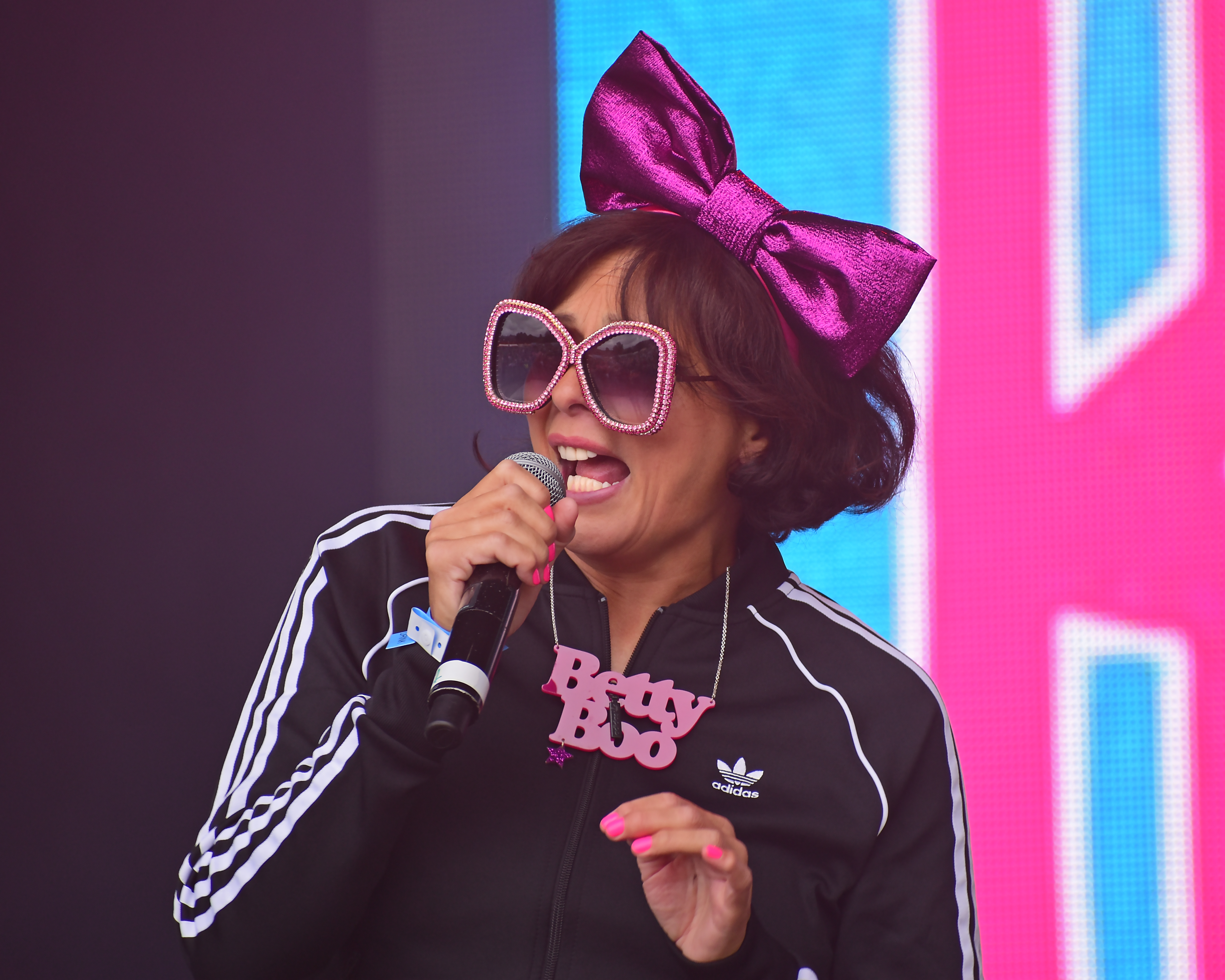
- Boo in 2021

Background information
- Born: Alison Moira Clarkson; 6 March 1970 (age 56); Kensington, London, England
- Genres: Dance-pop; hip-hop; pop-rap
- Occupations: Singer; songwriter; rapper
- Years active: 1987–present
- Labels: Music of Life; Rhythm King; Sire; Instant Karma
- Website: officialbettyboo.com

Alison Moira Clarkson (born 6 March 1970), better known by her stage name Betty Boo, is a British singer, songwriter and rapper. She first came to mainstream prominence in the late 1980s following a collaboration with the Beatmasters on the song "Hey DJ/I Can't Dance (To That Music You're Playing)". Between 1990 and 1992 she had a successful solo career, which spawned a number of chart-placing singles, most notably "Doin' the Do", "Where Are You Baby?", and "Let Me Take You There".

In 2025, Betty Boo re-released her first two studio albums and toured in the UK for the first time.

== Career ==
=== 1987–1999: Betty Boo ===
Clarkson studied sound engineering at the Holloway School of Audio Engineering before having several hits between 1989 and 1992. Originally nicknamed "Betty Boop" for her similarity to the cartoon character, she changed it to avoid trademark disputes. Of mixed Dusun and Scottish ancestry, she had an unusual, striking Emma Peel-like look, dressed in mildly revealing outfits and proved to be an influential pop music figure whose "sassy, powerful music and image launched a thousand wannabes". Writing for The Guardian in August 1990, Lucy O'Brien noted the difference between the "quietly spoken" Clarkson and her "lovable toughie" pop star alter-ego, describing the latter as "a cartoon combination of Betty Boop, Barbarella and Buck Rogers".

Whilst still at school, Boo began her musical career in hip-hop groups such as Hit 'N' Run and the She Rockers, the latter act who were signed to the British independent record label Music of Life. The She Rockers' success led her to New York and work with Public Enemy, who encouraged her to pursue a solo career. Commenting on her time spent supporting Public Enemy on tour in the US, as well as working with Professor Griff in the recording studio on the song "Give It a Rest", Boo revealed that things did not go as expected: "They were producing our single and I thought it would sound like their stuff, but it didn't at all. And some of the crowds were hostile to us. They didn't throw anything, no, but they wanted to see Public Enemy and they just weren't interested in us."

Her big break came when she appeared as a guest vocalist on the 1989 number 7 UK hit single, "Hey DJ – I Can't Dance (To That Music You're Playing)" by the Beatmasters, which was included in original form on their album Anywayawanna. Boo's first solo single, "Doin' the Do", followed and was also a UK singles chart number 7 success for her in 1990, selling 200,000 copies and reaching number one on Billboard's dance chart in the United States. One year later, the song was used as the title tune for Magic Pockets video game by the Bitmap Brothers. Boomania, her platinum-selling debut album, was largely self-written and self-produced in her bedroom. Her second solo single, "Where Are You Baby?", which reached number 3 in August 1990, is her biggest solo hit to date. "24 Hours" was the third and final single to be issued from Boomania, and although it was a hit, it was less so than previous releases, stalling at number 25 in December 1990. Her initial success was compounded at the 1991 BRIT Awards ceremony where she was voted that year's best British Breakthrough Act. In 1991, her "Why, Oh Why?" 1950s-style love ballad featured on the soundtrack of the American film A Rage in Harlem.

Her career suffered a setback when in July 1991, while touring Australia, Boo was revealed to be lip-synching at a concert rather than performing live. The 21st Century Dance Club in Frankston, Australia received "hundreds of complaints" after her performance, during which Boo fled the stage after dropping her microphone, revealing she was miming to a backing track. The incident was widely reported, and Boo cancelled the remainder of her tour, citing influenza and fever.

Boo returned with a new record deal in 1992 having signed to WEA. Her follow-up album, GRRR! It's Betty Boo, suffered very disappointing sales in the UK, peaking at number 62 on the albums chart. It did, nevertheless, spawn another UK hit single titled "Let Me Take You There", which reached number 12 in August 1992. A further single, "I'm on My Way", featured a musical quote from the Beatles' "Lady Madonna" which, unusually, was not a sample—the song's brass riff was re-created using all the original players. However, the single did not sell well and entered the chart at number 44 in October 1992. Her next single, "Hangover", fared even worse, barely scraping the Top 50 upon release in April 1993. Following the release of GRRR!, Clarkson turned down an offer to sign with Madonna's Maverick Records, and in 1999 a Best Of compilation album—effectively an expanded version of Boomania with extra remixes and a different running order—was released and sold moderately well.

=== 2006–2014: Subsequent works ===
In 2006, Clarkson formed a pop duo called WigWam, with Alex James, bassist from Blur. Together, they worked with music producer Ben Hillier, along with former Boo collaborators the Beatmasters. Despite working to create "an album of experimental yet accessible 21st century pop", just one single emerged from their musical partnership, the self-titled "WigWam" released on 3 April 2006 via Instant Karma Records.

In August 2007, Clarkson released a new single titled "Take Off". The song, which was playlisted on Radio 1's dance-orientated shows, was a joint project with the London-based dance act Jack Rokka and, as such, is much more dance-orientated than her previous work. She went on to perform the collaboration in a live set at Manchester Pride in 2007, along with some of her other songs. The video sees Betty Boo's trademark look resurrected and even features the 'Boosters' – Betty Boo's backing dancers, who always appear with identical hair and outfits to hers – and the Betty Boo spiral. Clarkson appeared on ITV's Loose Women on 16 October 2007 to promote the single, and has also appeared as an interviewee on BBC Three's The Most Annoying Pop Songs... show, passing comment on several songs that made the Top 100 list.

In July 2009, historian Kate Williams reported on BBC Radio 4's Broadcasting House that she is working with Clarkson to develop a musical version of Williams' biography England's Mistress: The Infamous Life of Emma Hamilton. In June 2011, Clarkson featured as Betty Boo (and is credited) on the track "Virtually Art" by the Feeling on the double-album edition of their 2011 release, Together We Were Made. In July 2014, Betty Boo performed on stage at the Penn Festival, while in 2021 she was announced as one of the artists performing as part of the Let's Rock retro music festival line-ups, at various dates throughout the UK.

=== 2022–present: Return to music ===
On 10 January 2022, Boo announced the release of the single "Get Me to the Weekend". The second single "Shining Star", was released on 12 May 2022. Her first album in 30 years, Boomerang, was released on 14 October 2022.

On 14 June 2024, Boo released the single "It Was Beautiful" (featuring HEX) from her fourth album Rip Up the Rulebook.

== Songwriter ==
After her solo career effectively ended when her mother contracted terminal cancer in the early 1990s, Clarkson turned to songwriting, at the request of Chris Herbert, who was in the process of forming a new, all-girl group. Herbert asked her to contribute to the project after revealing that she was his inspiration in forming one of his previous projects, the Spice Girls: "He told me that when they were auditioning for the Spice Girls, they were looking for five Betty Boos – larger-than-life cartoon characters. He asked me to get involved in this other band he was putting together, Girl Thing, because he wanted this signature Betty Boo sound, a bit of hip-hop."

Clarkson went on to co-write a number of songs for Girl Thing, including "Pure and Simple". Although the group's A&R man, Simon Cowell, initially rejected her song, it was included in the Japanese edition of Girl Thing's self-titled debut album, released in 2001. The song became a huge, record-breaking hit single when it was re-recorded and released as the debut single of Hear'Say—winners of the reality TV show, Popstars—in March of the same year. On the release, Clarkson commented: "The arrangement they used was almost identical. I never met the band. It was a bit disheartening". The song went on to win the Ivor Novello Award for the biggest selling single of 2001, however despite finding renewed success by writing for other artists, Clarkson criticised the audition-based, manufactured pop process which created them.

Clarkson has also written songs for Girls Aloud (reunited with the Beatmasters), Louise, Dannii Minogue, The Tweenies and for Sophie Ellis-Bextor's fourth studio album Make a Scene (though her contributions did not make the final album).

== Awards and nominations ==
Award	Year	Nominee(s)	Category	Result	Ref.
Brit Awards	1991	Herself	British Breakthrough Act	Won	
Brit Awards	1991	Herself	British Female Solo Artist	Nominated	
Brit Awards	1991	"Where Are You Baby?"	British Video of the Year	Nominated	
Ivor Novello Awards	2002	"Pure and Simple"	Best Selling UK Single	Won	
NME Awards	1991	Herself	Object of Desire	Won	

== Discography ==
=== Studio albums ===
Title	Album details	Peak chart positions							Certifications (sales thresholds)
Title	Album details	UK	UK Down.	AUS	GER	NED	NZ	SCO	Certifications (sales thresholds)
Boomania	Released: 10 September 1990; Label: Rhythm King	4	—	68	—	88	25	38	BPI: Platinum
GRRR! It's Betty Boo	Released: 12 October 1992; Label: WEA International	62	—	—	97	—	—	43	
Boomerang	Released: 14 October 2022; Label: Betty Boo Records	45	7	—	—	—	—	19	
Rip Up the Rule Book	Released: 30 August 2024; Label: Betty Boo Records	—	59	—	—	—	—	40	

=== Compilation albums ===
Title	Album details
Doin' the Do: The Best of Betty Boo	Released: 1999; Label: BMG, Camden

=== Video albums ===
Title	Album details
Boomania – The Boomin Vids	Released: 1990; Label: Virgin Music Video

=== Singles ===
Year	Single	Peak positions											Certifications	Album
Year	Single	UK	AUS	BEL (FL)	GER	IRE	NED	NZ	SWE	SWI	US	US Dance	Certifications	Album
1989	"Hey DJ / I Can't Dance (To That Music You're Playing)" (The Beatmasters featuring Betty Boo)	7	88	35	93	17	14	10	—	—	—	8		Boomania
1990	"Doin' the Do"	7	3	8	—	9	9	4	—	—	90	1	ARIA: Gold	Boomania
1990	"Where Are You Baby?"	3	19	—	29	6	16	11	—	13	—	—	BPI: Silver	Boomania
1990	"24 Hours"	25	94	—	32	17	74	—	—	10	—	—		Boomania
1992	"Let Me Take You There"	12	97	—	50	13	61	—	38	18	—	—		GRRR! It's Betty Boo
1992	"I'm on My Way"	44	—	—	—	—	—	—	—	—	—	—		GRRR! It's Betty Boo
1992	"Thing Goin' On" (US only)	—N/a									—	5		GRRR! It's Betty Boo
1993	"Hangover"	50	—	—	—	—	—	—	—	—	—	—		GRRR! It's Betty Boo
1993	"Catch Me" (US only)	—N/a									—	14		GRRR! It's Betty Boo
2007	"Take Off" (Jack Rokka vs Betty Boo)	92	—	—	—	—	—	—	—	—	—	—		Non-album single
2022	"Get Me to the Weekend"	–	—	—	—	—	—	—	—	—	—	—		Boomerang
2022	"Shining Star"	–	—	—	—	—	—	—	—	—	—	—		Boomerang
2022	"Boomerang"	–	—	—	—	—	—	—	—	—	—	—		Boomerang
2022	"Right By Your Side"(featuring David Gray)	–	—	—	—	—	—	—	—	—	—	—		Boomerang
2022	"Miracle" (featuring Chuck D)	–	—	—	—	—	—	—	—	—	—	—		Boomerang
2024	"It Was Beautiful" (featuring Hex)	–	—	—	—	—	—	—	—	—	—	—		Rip Up the Rulebook
2024	"One Day"	–	—	—	—	—	—	—	—	—	—	—		Rip Up the Rulebook
2024	"Barbarella"	–	—	—	—	—	—	—	—	—	—	—		Rip Up the Rulebook
"—" denotes releases that did not chart or were not released.

== See also ==
- List of artists who reached number one on the US Dance chart

== Bibliography ==
- Guinness Book of British Hit Singles – 16th Edition – ISBN 0-85112-190-X
- Guinness Book of British Hit Albums – 7th Edition – ISBN 0-85112-619-7
