= Don't Go (2010 film) =

- Film poster
- Directed by: Turgut Akaçık
- Written by: Turgut Akaçık
- Production company: Anima Studios Istanbul
- Release date: April 2010
- Running time: 3 minutes 51 seconds
- Country: Turkey

Don't Go is a 2010 Turkish animated short film written and directed by Turgut Akaçık, and produced by Anima Studios Istanbul. The film won the Special Distinction ex æquo and Junior Jury Award for a short film at the 2010 Annecy International Animated Film Festival.

== Music ==
The music used in the animated short film Don't Go is titled Invisible and was produced by Fischerspooner.
