= Boomania =

1990 studio album by Betty Boo

Studio album by Betty Boo
- Released: 10 September 1990
- Recorded: September 1989 – April 1990
- Genre: Pop-rap; dance-pop; pop-house
- Length: 47:47
- Label: Rhythm King
- Producer: King John; Betty Boo; The Beatmasters; Yvonne Ellis; Paul Myers; Dean Ross; William Orbit

Betty Boo chronology
Boomania (1990)	GRRR! It's Betty Boo (1992)

Singles from Boomania
- 1. "Hey DJ / I Can't Dance (To That Music You're Playing)" Released: 31 July 1989; 2. "Doin' the Do" Released: 8 May 1990; 3. "Where Are You Baby?" Released: 30 July 1990; 4. "24 Hours" Released: 26 November 1990

Doin' the Do: The Best of Betty Boo

Greatest hits album by Betty Boo
- Released: 6 November 1999
- Length: 73:00
- Label: BMG

Betty Boo chronology
GRRR! It's Betty Boo (1992)	Doin' the Do: The Best of Betty Boo (1999)	Boomerang (2022)

Professional ratings
Review scores
Source	Rating
AllMusic	3/5 stars
Classic Pop	4/5 stars
Los Angeles Times	2/5 stars
NME	7/10
Q	3/5 stars
Record Mirror	4 1/2/5
Select	2/5

Boomania is the debut album by the British singer Betty Boo, released on 10 September 1990. King John (a duo comprising Rex Brough and John Coxon) produced most of the songs on the album; Coxon continued to collaborate with Betty Boo on her second album, GRRR! It's Betty Boo in 1992.

In 1999, the album was reissued as Doin' the Do: The Best of Betty Boo. This edition consists of all the tracks from Boomania in a slightly different order, alongside extended versions of two of its singles, a remix, and a megamix, all of which were included on a later reissue of the original album by Cherry Pop Records. Its cover art features a mirrored version of the photo from the front of Boomania.

== Track listings ==
Standard edition
No.	Title	Writer(s)	Producer(s)	Length
1.	"Where Are You Baby?"	Betty Boo	Boo; King John; Peter Lorimer^{[a]}	4:12
2.	"Hey DJ / I Can't Dance (To That Music You're Playing)"	Boo; Amanda Glanfield; Paul Carter; Richard Walmsley; Debbie Dean; Deke Richards	The Beatmasters	3:13
3.	"Boo Is Booming"	Boo; Jeff Barry; Bobby Bloom	Boo; Yvonne Ellis	3:24
4.	"Boo's Boogie"	Boo; Rex Brough; John Coxon	Boo; King John	3:19
5.	"24 Hours"	Boo; Dean Ross; Paul Myers	Boo; Ross; Sweet Paulino; William Orbit	3:28
6.	"Valentine's Day"	Boo	Boo; King John; Ellis^{[a]}	4:44
7.	"Doin' the Do" (King John 7" mix)	Boo; Ben Yardley; Kenny Young	Boo; King John	4:05
8.	"('Til My Last Breath) Doin' It to Def"	Boo; Kevin Clark	Boo; King John; Don Weekes^{[a]}	4:43
9.	"Don't Know What to Do"	Boo	Boo; King John; Lorimer^{[a]}	3:48
10.	"Shame"	Boo; Coxon; Brough	Boo; King John	5:01
11.	"Mumbo Jumbo"	Boo; Andy Lovegrove; Matt Coldrick	Boo; Lovegrove; Coldrick	3:39
12.	"Leave Me Alone"	Boo	Boo; King John	4:45

CD bonus tracks
No.	Title	Writer(s)	Producer(s)	Length
13.	"Doin' the Do" (7" radio mix)	Boo; Yardley; Young	The Beatmasters	3:40
14.	"Where Are You Baby?" (King John mix)	Boo	Boo; King John	4:17
Total length:				56:28

2016 deluxe edition bonus disc
No.	Title	Writer(s)	Remixer(s)	Length
1.	"Hey DJ / I Can't Dance (To That Music You're Playing)" (EM-Q 7" mix)	Boo; Glanfield; Carter; Walmsley; Dean; Richards	DJ Streets Ahead	3:26
2.	"24 Hours" (12" version)	Boo; Ross; Myers	Orbit	5:31
3.	"Doin' the Do" (12" mix)	Boo; Yardley; Young	The Beatmasters	5:40
4.	"Where Are You Baby?" (12" mix)	Boo	Lorimer	6:37
5.	"Hey DJ / I Can't Dance (To That Music You're Playing)" (12" mix)	Boo; Glanfield; Carter; Walmsley; Dean; Richards	The Beatmasters	4:50
6.	"24 Hours" (Norman Cook mix)	Boo; Ross; Myers	Norman Cook	5:35
7.	"Shame" (Hoodlum mix)	Boo	Boo; King John	4:24
8.	"Hey DJ / I Can't Dance (To That Music You're Playing)" (EM-Q mix)	Boo; Glanfield; Carter; Walmsley; Dean; Richards	DJ Streets Ahead	5:47
9.	"24 Hours" (Oratronic mix)	Boo; Ross; Myers	Vince Clarke	5:20
10.	"Boo's Boogie" (12" version)	Boo; Coxon; Brough	Boo; King John	5:30
11.	"24 Hours" (12" instrumental)	Boo; Ross; Myers	Orbit	4:47
12.	"Boo Megamix" (comprises "24 Hours", "Hey DJ / I Can't Dance (To That Music You're Playing)", "Doin' the Do", and "Where Are You Baby?")	Boo; Coxon; Brough; Myers; Ross; Richards; Dean; Walmsley; Glanfield; Carter; Young; Yardley	DJ Streets Ahead	7:16
Total length:				64:40

Doin' the Do: The Best of Betty Boo
No.	Title	Writer(s)	Length
1.	"Where Are You Baby?" (7" version^{[b]})	Alison Clarkson	4:05
2.	"Doin' the Do" (7" version)	Clarkson; Young; Yardley	3:41
3.	"Hey DJ / I Can't Dance (To That Music You're Playing)"	Clarkson; Carter; Glanfield; Walmsley; Richards; D. Dean	3:15
4.	"24 Hours" (Norman Cook remix^{[b]})	Clarkson; Myers; Dean Ross	5:35
5.	"Boo's Boogie"	Clarkson; Brough; Coxon	3:19
6.	"Leave Me Alone"	Clarkson	4:45
7.	"Shame"	Clarkson; Brough; Coxon	5:01
8.	"Boo Is Booming"	Clarkson; Barry; Bloom	3:27
9.	"Mumbo Jumbo"	Clarkson; Lovegrove; Coldrick	3:39
10.	"('Til My Last Breath) Doin' It to Def"	Clarkson; Clark	4:45
11.	"Don't Know What to Do"	Clarkson	3:50
12.	"Valentine's Day"	Clarkson	4:44
13.	"24 Hours"	Clarkson; Myers; Ross	3:28
14.	"Where Are You Baby" (12" Peter Lorimer version^{[b]})	Clarkson	6:37
15.	"Doin' the Do" (12" version^{[b]})	Clarkson; Young; Yardley	5:38
16.	"Boo's Megamix^{[b]}"	Clarkson; Coxon; Brough; Myers; Ross; Richards; Dean; Walmsley; Glanfield; Carter; Young; Yardley	7:16

2025 reissue bonus disc
No.	Title	Remixer(s)	Length
1.	"Betty Boo Megamix"	DJ Streets Ahead	7:16
2.	"Doin' the Do" (Beatmasters Club mix)	The Beatmasters	6:15
3.	"Doin' the Do" (Damned If You Do mix)	Shep Pettibone	6:52
4.	"Doin' the Do" (Doin' the Wop mix)	Pettibone	6:42
5.	"Hey DJ / I Can't Dance (To That Music You're Playing)" (Club House mix)	Ricky Crespo	7:37
6.	"Hey DJ / I Can't Dance (To That Music You're Playing)" (12" mix)	The Beatmasters	6:38
7.	"Where Are You Baby?" (Shakedown mix)	Pettibone	7:37
8.	"Where Are You Baby?" (Extended mix)	John Coxon	5:39
9.	"Where Are You Baby?" (12" mix)		6:37
10.	"24 Hours" (Oratronic mix)	Vince Clarke	5:20
11.	"24 Hours" (Norman Cook remix)	Norman Cook	5:35
12.	"Shame" (Hoodlum mix)	King John	4:26
Total length:			76:38

Notes

- ^{^a} denotes an additional producer.
- ^{^b} denotes tracks on Doin' the Do: The Best of Betty Boo that were not included on the original edition of Boomania.
- Engineered by Mark Gilbert.
- "Hey DJ / I Can't Dance (To That Music You're Playing)" is a reworking of "I Can't Dance to That Music You're Playing" by Martha Reeves and the Vandellas.
- "Boo Is Booming" samples "Montego Bay" by Bobby Bloom.
- "Doin' the Do" samples the 1968 song "Captain of Your Ship" by Reparata and the Delrons.
- Some original CD and cassette releases omit the bonus tracks. The UK cassette includes the bonus tracks, but "Doin' the Do (7" Radio Mix)" is moved to the end of side one, after "Valentine's Day".

== Charts ==
Chart performance for Boomania
Chart (1990–91)	Peak position
Australia (ARIA Charts)	68
New Zealand Albums (RMNZ)	25
United Kingdom (Official Charts Company)	4
