= I Don't Wanna Leave =

I Don't Wanna Leave may refer to:

- "I Don't Wanna Leave" (Lidia Kopania song), 2009
- "I Don't Wanna Leave" (Rüfüs Du Sol song), 2021
