= Girls season 1 =

Girls
- Season 1
- Region 1 DVD
- No. of episodes: 10

Release
- Original network: HBO
- Original release: April 15 – June 17, 2012

The first season of American comedy-drama television series Girls premiered on HBO on April 15, 2012, and consisted of 10 episodes, concluding on June 17, 2012. The series was created by Lena Dunham, who portrays the lead character, who based the premise and central aspects of the show on her personal life. It was produced by Apatow Productions, I Am Jenni Konner Productions and HBO Entertainment.

The season introduces Dunham's character Hannah Horvath, an immature aspiring writer from East Lansing, Michigan who is in for a surprise when she is informed by her parents that they will no longer support her financially. Having received their support for two years, following her graduation from Oberlin College, Hannah struggles with her newly established independence as she is left to her own devices in Greenpoint, Brooklyn. Within Hannah's circle of friends they include Marnie Michaels (Allison Williams), Jessa Johansson (Jemima Kirke) and Shoshanna Shapiro (Zosia Mamet).

== Cast and characters ==
=== Main ===
- Lena Dunham as Hannah Helene Horvath, an aspiring writer living in Greenpoint, Brooklyn, known for her narcissism and immaturity, who struggles to support herself and find a direction in her life.
- Allison Williams as Marnie Michaels, Hannah's best friend, roommate and classmate of Hannah's at Oberlin College.
- Jemima Kirke as Jessa Johansson, one of Hannah's closest friends who is a global citizen of British origin, and is noted for her bohemian, unpredictable, and brash personality.
- Zosia Mamet as Shoshanna Shapiro, Jessa's bubble-headed and innocent American cousin who is pursuing a Media, Culture, and Communications major at New York University.
- Adam Driver as Adam Sackler, Hannah's aloof, passionate and casual boyfriend who works as a part-time carpenter and actor. He is an alcoholic who has been sober for years.

=== Recurring ===
- Christopher Abbott as Charlie Dattolo
- Alex Karpovsky as Raymond "Ray" Ploshansky
- Andrew Rannells as Elijah Krantz
- Becky Ann Baker as Loreen Horvath
- Peter Scolari as Tad Horvath
- James LeGros as Jeff Lavoyt
- Kathryn Hahn as Katherine Lavoyt
- Clare Foley as Lola Lavoyt
- Mackenzie Gray as Beatrix Lavoyt
- Richard Masur as Rich Glatter
- Jorma Taccone as Booth Jonathan
- Chris O'Dowd as Thomas-John
- Jenny Slate as Tally Schifrin

== Episodes ==
No. overall	No. in season	Title	Directed by	Written by	Original release date	US viewers (millions)
1	1	"Pilot"	Lena Dunham	Lena Dunham	April 15, 2012	0.872
Aspiring writer Hannah Horvarth is cut off financially by her parents Tad and Loreen, and she loses her internship when she tries to convert it into a paying job. Hannah's best friend and roommate, Marnie, contemplates breaking up with her long-term boyfriend Charlie. Hannah and Marnie throw a welcome-back dinner party in their apartment for their close friend Jessa, who has moved in with her naive cousin Shoshanna. During the party, Hannah drinks opium tea prepared by Charlie's bandmate Ray; she later shows up at her parents' hotel room high and seeking financial assistance, which they refuse. After Jessa shows up late to her own party, Marnie confronts her over her careless ways, and Jessa reveals that she is pregnant.
2	2	"Vagina Panic"	Lena Dunham	Lena Dunham	April 22, 2012	0.858
Jessa schedules an abortion. Marnie and Shoshanna agree to attend as moral support, whilst Hannah decides to get tested for STDs after she discovers that her friend-with-benefits, Adam, is having unprotected sex with other girls. Hannah attends a job interview, but they decide not to hire her when she makes a joke about date rape. Jessa does not show up to her appointment and instead goes to a bar; she realizes her pregnancy was a false alarm when she gets her period while hooking up with a stranger in the bathroom. While waiting at the abortion clinic, Shoshanna admits to Marnie that she is still a virgin.
3	3	"All Adventurous Women Do"	Lena Dunham	Lena Dunham	April 29, 2012	0.816
Hannah learns she has contracted HPV, but Adam protests the idea that he gave it to her, claiming to have been tested recently. Shoshanna tells Hannah that Jessa also contracted HPV by knowingly sleeping with a man who has it, reasoning that "All adventurous women do." Later, Hannah meets up with her ex-boyfriend Elijah for drinks and finds out that he is gay. They get into an argument over Elijah's sexuality and Hannah's accusation that he gave her HPV. Meanwhile, Jessa begins her new job as a babysitter and makes a connection with the children's father Jeff, while Marnie bonds with a local artist, Booth Jonathan. Hannah ruminates about her recent events on Twitter, but ultimately decides she can accept having HPV.
4	4	"Hannah's Diary"	Richard Shepard	Lena Dunham	May 6, 2012	0.743
Hannah starts her new job as a secretary at a law firm, but finds herself the target of sexual harassment by her leering boss Rich; the other women in the office counsel Hannah to simply put up with it. When Adam sends Hannah a photo of his penis and then a text claiming "SRY that wasn't for you," Marnie suggests Hannah dump him immediately. Hannah visits Adam to express her dismay, but the two end up kissing. Shoshanna makes out with Matt, whom she knew from summer camp, but he refuses to have sex with her after learning that she is a virgin. Jessa briefly loses the two children she babysits, but Jeff is forgiving. Whilst at Marnie and Hannah's apartment, Charlie and Ray discover Hannah's diary. They publicize Hannah's opinions about Marnie and Charlie's relationship as song lyrics, sundering the happy couple and causing an argument between Marnie and Hannah.
5	5	"Hard Being Easy"	Jesse Peretz	Lena Dunham	May 13, 2012	0.830
Marnie visits Charlie's apartment to beg his forgiveness, and eventually they reconcile; however, mid-coitus Marnie realizes that she is done with the relationship and breaks up with him. Meanwhile, Hannah decides to file a sexual harassment suit against Rich after he brushes off her demands to stop touching her. To make her case against him stronger, Hannah tries to go further by attempting to seduce Rich, but she fails and is forced to quit her job. Hannah visits Adam, but is upset to learn that he has misinterpreted the status of their relationship. Elsewhere, Jessa reconnects with a former boyfriend, and brings him over to her apartment. They have quick sex, after which she dumps him just to make him see how she felt when he rejected her.
6	6	"The Return"	Lena Dunham	Lena Dunham & Judd Apatow	May 20, 2012	0.678
Hannah returns to Michigan for her parents' 30th anniversary. Over the course of the weekend, Hannah has a fling with a pharmacist friend from high school, and begins to doubt the wisdom of her decision to move to New York and pursue a writing career. Loreen admits to Tad that she decided to cut Hannah off financially to give her an experience to write about, and she later informs Hannah that she is willing to resume giving her financial assistance; Hannah refuses, claiming that it will not be necessary. Late at night, Adam calls Hannah and makes it clear that he still cares for her.
7	7	"Welcome to Bushwick a.k.a. The Crackcident"	Jody Lee Lipes	Lena Dunham & Jenni Konner	May 27, 2012	0.868
The four girls attend a warehouse party in Brooklyn. Hannah meets one of Adam's friends and learns that he is a member of Alcoholics Anonymous. Marnie and Charlie attempt to converse for the first time since breaking up, but Marnie is stunned when Charlie's new girlfriend Audrey arrives. Shoshanna accidentally smokes crack cocaine; Jessa assigns Ray to keep an eye on her, leading to a foot chase through the deserted streets. Jessa sends a taunting text to an anonymous number, only to discover it is Jeff, and that she has inadvertently invited him to the party. She gets him into a physical altercation, and then turns him down when he makes a pass at her. Hannah and Adam have an argument about the fact that Adam has never talked about his own life and history because Hannah is too self-absorbed to ask him. She rectifies this, and they begin formally dating.
8	8	"Weirdos Need Girlfriends Too"	Jody Lee Lipes	Lena Dunham & Dan Sterling	June 3, 2012	1.094
Having officially begun a relationship with Adam, Hannah delves deeper into Adam's life and tries changing her life by jogging with him and eating healthy foods. She attends Adam's tech rehearsal for an upcoming play, but Adam storms out and quits after fighting with his writing partner. An unemployed Jessa and a down-and-out Marnie form an unexpected bond by going out for drinks at a local bar. Jessa and Marnie meet Thomas-John, a wealthy, eligible bachelor. They end up going to his apartment, during which he fails to achieve a threesome with the girls.
9	9	"Leave Me Alone"	Richard Shepard	Lena Dunham & Bruce Eric Kaplan	June 10, 2012	0.866
Hannah attends a book-signing event for a new memoir written by her college classmate Tally Schifrin. At the event, Hannah's former professor encourages her to attend a writing circle and read one of her pieces aloud; Hannah hesitates about what to read at the last minute, and she ends up reading an unpolished new work that is poorly received. She is also forced to take a job at the coffee shop where Ray works, relieving Marnie, who has been covering Hannah's bills. Meanwhile, Jeff's wife Katherine visits Jessa and asks her to return to work; the two ultimately realize it would be a poor idea, and Katherine lectures Jessa about her destructive behavior. Hannah and Marnie get into an argument about Hannah's self-centeredness, and Marnie decides to move out.
10	10	"She Did"	Lena Dunham	Lena Dunham	June 17, 2012	1.004
After Marnie moves out, Adam offers to move in. Jessa invites her friends to a mystery party, which turns out to be her wedding to Thomas-John. Marnie decides to embrace her free-spirited nature and impulsively hooks up with the best man, to Charlie's dismay. Ray approaches Shoshanna for the first time since "The Crackcident" and admits that he is attracted to her; they go home together and Shoshanna finally loses her virginity. Hannah chats with Elijah and his boyfriend, and they decide to move in together. To her surprise, Adam is offended, as he offered to move in because he loves her. The two get into a terrible fight, which ends when Adam is hit by a car outside. Hannah, now single, takes the subway home but falls asleep; she wakes up in the morning in Coney Island with her purse stolen. The season ends as she sits alone on the beach, eating the piece of wedding cake she saved for Adam.

== Release ==
=== Critical reception ===
The first season of Girls received universal acclaim from television critics. On the review aggregator website Metacritic, the first season of the series holds an average of 87 based on 29 reviews. The website also lists the show as the highest-rated fictional series debut of 2012. James Poniewozik from Time reserved high praise for the series, calling it "raw, audacious, nuanced and richly, often excruciatingly funny". Tim Goodman of The Hollywood Reporter called Girls "one of the most original, spot-on, no-missed-steps series in recent memory". Reviewing the first three episodes at the 2012 SXSW Festival, he said the series conveys "real female friendships, the angst of emerging adulthood, nuanced relationships, sexuality, self-esteem, body image, intimacy in a tech-savvy world that promotes distance, the bloodlust of surviving New York on very little money and the modern parenting of entitled children, among many other things—all laced together with humor and poignancy". The New York Times also applauded the series and said: "Girls may be the millennial generation's rebuttal to Sex and the City, but the first season was at times as cruelly insightful and bleakly funny as Louie on FX or Curb Your Enthusiasm on HBO."

=== Accolades ===
- Nominated: Critics' Choice Award for Best Comedy Series — Girls
- Nominated: Critics' Choice Award for Best Actress in a Comedy Series — Lena Dunham
- Nominated: TCA Award for Outstanding New Program — Girls
- Nominated: TCA Award for Individual Achievement in Comedy — Lena Dunham
- Nominated: Primetime Emmy Award for Outstanding Comedy Series — Girls
- Nominated: Primetime Emmy Award for Outstanding Lead Actress in a Comedy Series — Lena Dunham
- Nominated: Primetime Emmy Award for Outstanding Directing for a Comedy Series — Lena Dunham
- Nominated: Primetime Emmy Award for Outstanding Writing for a Comedy Series — Lena Dunham
- Win: Primetime Emmy Award for Outstanding Casting for a Comedy Series — Jennifer Euston
- Nominated: Satellite Awards for Best Television Series – Musical or Comedy — Girls
- Nominated: Satellite Awards for Best Actress – Television Series Musical or Comedy — Lena Dunham
- Nominated: Writers Guild of America Award for Comedy Series — Girls
- Win: Writers Guild of America Award for New Series — Girls
- Nominated: Women's Image Network Award for Outstanding Film / Show Written by A Woman — Lena Dunham
- Nominated: Women's Image Network Award for Outstanding Film / Show Directed by A Woman — Lena Dunham
- Win: Peabody Award for Area of Excellence — Girls
- Win: Golden Globe Award for Best Television Series – Comedy or Musical — Girls
- Win: Golden Globe Award for Best Performance by an Actress in a Television Series – Comedy or Musical — Lena Dunham
- Win: Directors Guild of America Award for Outstanding Directorial Achievement in Comedy Series — Lena Dunham (for "Pilot")
- Win: Art Directors Guild Award for Episode of a Half Hour Single-Camera Television Series — Judy Becker (for "Pilot")
- Win: British Academy Television Awards – International Prize — Girls

=== Ratings ===
Episode	U.S. viewers	UK viewers
1.1	872,000	181,000
1.2	858,000	114,000
1.3	816,000	132,000
1.4	743,000	149,000
1.5	830,000	137,000
1.6	678,000	141,000
1.7	868,000	160,000
1.8	1,090,000	101,000
1.9	866,000	123,000
1.10	1,004,000	119,000

=== Home media ===
Girls: The Complete First Season
Set details	Special features	
10 episodes; minutes; 3-DVD set (All included countries); 2-Blu-ray set (Region A standard digipack with bonus DVD & digital copy); 3-Blu-ray set (Region A Target Exclusive digipack with bonus Blu-ray, DVD & digital copy); 2-Blu-ray set (Region B United Kingdom & Australia); 1.78:1 aspect ratio; Audio: English: Dolby Digital 5.1 (DVD); English: DTS-HD 5.1 (Blu-ray); Subtitles: English SDH, French, Spanish, Danish, Finnish, Norwegian, Swedish; Rating: United States: TV-MA; United Kingdom: 18; Australia: MA15+		
DVD release dates
Region 1	Region 2	Region 4
December 11, 2012	February 4, 2013	December 12, 2012
