= Where Are You Baby? =

1990 single by Betty Boo

Single by Betty Boo

from the album Boomania
- B-side: "Boo's Boogie"
- Released: 30 July 1990
- Genre: Pop
- Length: 4:15
- Label: Rhythm King
- Songwriter: Alison Clarkson
- Producers: Betty Boo; King John

Betty Boo singles chronology
"Doin' the Do" (1990)	"Where Are You Baby?" (1990)	"24 Hours" (1990)

Music video
- "Where Are You Baby?" on YouTube

"Where Are You Baby?" is a song by English singer, songwriter and pop-rap artist Betty Boo, included on her debut album, Boomania (1990). The song was released as a single in July 1990, peaking at number three on the UK Singles Chart in September 1990. Outside the United Kingdom, the single reached the top 10 in Ireland, Luxembourg and Spain. The song features a prominent sample of the Velvelettes song "He Was Really Sayin' Somethin'". German magazine Spex included "Where Are You Baby?" on its "The Best Singles of the Century" list in 1999.

== Critical reception ==
Steve Hochman from Los Angeles Times felt that "Where Are You Baby?" "is as engaging a bit of pop fluff as you’re likely to find, as wonderfully frothy as Bananarama’s early best—if not Lesley Gore’s." Paul Lester from Melody Maker said that the song "sounds like it was crafted by several experts with years of experience in how to contrive sublime chart noise." David Giles from Music Week wrote that the follow-up to the hugely successful "Doin' the Do" "should fare even better, since it possesses an instantly alluring chorus with distinct traces of Motown acts like the Supremes and Martha Reeves. A possible number one?"

== Track listings ==
- CD
1. "Where Are You Baby?" (radio edit)
2. "Boo's Boogie" (12-inch version)
3. "Where Are You Baby?" (12-inch mix)
- 7-inch and cassette
1. "Where Are You Baby?" (radio edit)
2. "Boo's Boogie" (7-inch version)
- 12-inch
1. "Where Are You Baby?" (12-inch mix)
2. "Boo's Boogie" (12-inch version)

== Charts ==
Chart (1990–1991)	Peak position
Australia (ARIA)	19
Europe (Eurochart Hot 100)	7
Germany (GfK)	29
Ireland (IRMA)	6
Luxembourg (Radio Luxembourg)	2
Netherlands (Dutch Top 40)	23
Netherlands (Single Top 100)	16
New Zealand (Recorded Music NZ)	11
Spain (AFYVE)	10
Switzerland (Schweizer Hitparade)	13
UK Singles (Official Charts)	3

== Certifications ==
Region	Certification	Certified units/sales
United Kingdom (BPI)	Silver	200,000^{^}
^{^} Shipments figures based on certification alone.
