= Beautiful World Live =

Video by Take That
- Released: 25 February 2008 (Europe)
- Recorded: 6 & 7 December 2007
- Venue: The O2 Arena, London UK
- Genre: Pop
- Language: English
- Label: Polydor

Take That chronology
Take That: The Ultimate Tour (2006)	Beautiful World Live (2008)

Beautiful World Live is a DVD by boyband Take That.

== DVD Information ==
The DVD features a full-length concert of Take That recorded at The O2 Arena in London on 6 and 7 December 2007, during the Beautiful World Tour, which played to over half a million people. Released in Europe on 25 February 2008 and 8 April 2008 internationally, it broke sales records by becoming the fastest selling DVD in the UK, selling 64,000 copies in its first week of release. It outsold a CD. Back To Black by Amy Winehouse, the number one album that week, becoming the first time a DVD had outsold the #1 CD. The DVD remained at number one of the BBC Radio 1 Chart for a record breaking eight consecutive weeks.

For the DVD, Take That won "Best Live Act" at the 2008 BRIT Awards.

== Track listing ==
DVD 1

1. "Overture"
2. "Reach Out"
3. "It Only Takes A Minute"
4. "Beautiful World"
5. "Patience"
6. "Hold On"
7. "I'd Wait For Life"
8. "Relight My Fire"
9. "Rule the World"
10. "Could It Be Magic"
11. "Back For Good"
12. "Everything Changes"
13. "Wooden Boat"
14. "Give Good Feeling"
15. "Sure"
16. "Never Forget"
17. "Shine"
18. "Pray"

DVD2 (Bonus Features)

1. The Journey [Documentary]
2. Band commentary
3. Photo gallery

== Charts ==
=== Weekly charts ===
Chart (2008)	Peak position
Spanish Music DVD Chart	1

== Release history ==
Region	Date	Label
Europe	25 February 2008	Universal Music Operations
International	8 April 2008	Universal Music International
