= Shine (Take That song) =

2007 single by Take That

Single by Take That

from the album Beautiful World
- B-side: "Trouble with Me"; "We Love to Entertain You"
- Released: 26 February 2007
- Genre: Pop
- Length: 3:31 (album version); 3:29 (radio mix, single version)
- Label: Polydor
- Songwriters: Take That; Steve Robson
- Producer: John Shanks

Take That singles chronology
"Patience" (2006)	"Shine" (2007)	"I'd Wait for Life" (2007)

Music video
- "Shine" on YouTube

"Shine" is the second single taken from English pop group Take That's comeback album, Beautiful World (2006). It became Take That's sixth consecutive number one single and their 10th number-one overall, making them one of only seven acts in the history of the UK charts to have more than nine number one hits.

== Background and release ==
The song is written in the key signature of E flat major; however, on some live versions it is performed in D major. It later emerged that Robbie Williams was the subject of the track, written and released prior to his decision to return to the band.

The version of "Shine" performed during the band's Beautiful World Tour in 2007 featured an intro that was taken from the finale to the song "Mr. Blue Sky" by the British pop rock group Electric Light Orchestra—this was also done on the group's subsequent The Circus Live Tour in 2009, on the Progress Live Tour in 2011, on the Take That Live Tour in 2015 and on The Circus Live Tour again in 2026.

"Shine" was released on 26 February 2007 and features lead vocals by Mark Owen. A 'live' version was recorded at a session with BBC Radio 2, and appears on the CD singles of "I'd Wait for Life" and "Reach Out". The song went on to win the British single of the year award at the 2008 BRIT Awards making it Take That's seventh Brit Award.

== Critical reception ==
Sharon Mawer from AllMusic described the song as "a masterpiece of 21st century pop". The BBC noted the song as "a brilliant Beatlesesque, funky pop song". Digital Spy rated the song 5/5 commenting on the musical development of the band, labelling the tune "exciting" and a "really great, fun track".

== Commercial performance ==
The single entered the UK Singles Chart at number 83, and made its official debut to the charts at number 30 the following week, three weeks before its physical release. It reached number one on 4 March 2007, staying two weeks at the top. The single peaked at number two on the download chart. During its first week at the top of the UK Singles Chart, the single rose from number 20 to 2 on the Irish Singles Chart.

The single has been certified double Platinum in the UK for sales over 1,200,000, and was the second most played/used song of the 2000s in the UK, as reported by UK music licensing body PPL.

== Music video ==
The video for "Shine" was directed by Justin Dickel with a concept of recreating a Busby Berkeley-style musical number. It premiered on Channel 4 on 25 January 2007 at 11:05 p.m. While Gary Barlow sits at the piano, the other three members perform the song for the most part on a noble staircase. In the background, a dozen women who are dressed in gold dance.

== Track listings ==
UK CD single

1. "Shine" (radio mix) – 3:29
2. "Trouble with Me" – 3:23

German CD single

1. "Shine" – 3:29
2. "Trouble with Me" – 3:23
3. "Patience" (stripped down version) – 3:19
4. "Shine" (video) – 3:29

Dutch CD single

1. "Shine" – 3:29
2. "Trouble with Me" – 3:23
3. "Patience" (stripped down version) – 3:19
4. "Patience" (Live In Goede tijden, slechte tijden - video) – 3:29

Belgian CD single

1. "Shine" – 3:29
2. "We Love to Entertain You" – 4:11

== Personnel ==
- Mark Owen – lead vocals
- Gary Barlow – backing vocals
- Howard Donald – backing vocals
- Jason Orange – backing vocals

== Charts ==
=== Weekly charts ===
Chart (2007)	Peak position
Austria (Ö3 Austria Top 40)	24
Belgium (Ultratip Bubbling Under Flanders)	4
Belgium (Ultratip Bubbling Under Wallonia)	16
CIS Airplay (TopHit)	64
Czech Republic Airplay (ČNS IFPI)	92
Denmark (Tracklisten)	7
Denmark Airplay (Tracklisten)	7
Europe (Eurochart Hot 100)	3
Europe (Euro Digital Song Sales)	6
Europe (European Hit Radio)	8
Germany (GfK)	21
Hungary (Rádiós Top 40)	30
Ireland (IRMA)	2
Italy (FIMI)	4
Italy (Musica e dischi)	7
Latvia (Latvijas Top 40)	31
Netherlands (Dutch Top 40)	18
Netherlands (Single Top 100)	20
Romania (Romanian Top 100)	21
Russia Airplay (TopHit)	60
Scottish Singles Sales (Official Charts)	1
Slovakia Airplay (ČNS IFPI)	11
Spain Airplay (Top 40 Radio)	18
Switzerland (Schweizer Hitparade)	27
Switzerland Airplay (Swiss Hitparade)	13
Ukraine Airplay (TopHit)	109
UK Singles (Official Charts)	1
UK Airplay (Music Week)	1

Chart (2023)	Peak position
UK Singles Downloads (Official Charts)	76
UK Singles Sales (OCC)	78

=== Year-end charts ===
Chart (2007)	Position
Europe (Eurochart Hot 100)	55
Italy (FIMI)	34
Italy (Musica e dischi)	47
Netherlands (Dutch Top 40)	186
UK Singles (OCC)	18
UK Airplay (Music Week)	2

Chart (2008)	Position
UK Airplay (Music Week)	31

== Certifications ==
Region	Certification	Certified units/sales
Denmark (IFPI Danmark)	Gold	7,500^{^}
United Kingdom (BPI)	2× Platinum	1,200,000^{‡}
^{^} Shipments figures based on certification alone.^{‡} Sales+streaming figures based on certification alone.

== Samplings ==
The song is sampled in Lily Allen's 2009 song "Who'd Have Known" (co-produced by John Shanks, who produced "Shine"), which in turn is sampled in T-Pain's 2011 single "5 O'Clock", the latter of which credits Allen as a featured artist.

== In popular culture ==
The song was featured in several commercials for the Morrisons supermarkets in the UK, fronted by actress Denise van Outen, television presenters Nick Hancock and Gabby Logan, gardener Diarmuid Gavin, singer Lulu, football pundit Alan Hansen and television presenter Richard Hammond. According to a PRS-published list of songs used in TV and radio advertisements, it was the 7th most played song for the year 2012.
