= Brit Award for British Male Solo Artist =

British music award

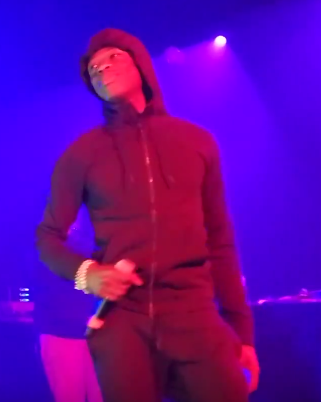
- 2021 Winner J Hus
- Awarded for: Achievement in excellent British male solo artist
- Country: United Kingdom (UK)
- Presented by: British Phonographic Industry (BPI)
- First award: 1977
- Final award: 2021
- Currently held by: J Hus (2021)

Highlights
- Most awards: Robbie Williams (4)
- Most nominations: Elton John; Phil Collins (8 each)
- Website: www.brits.co.uk

The Brit Award for British Male Solo Artist was an award given by the British Phonographic Industry (BPI), an organisation which represents record companies and artists in the United Kingdom. The accolade was presented at the Brit Awards, an annual celebration of British and international music. The winners and nominees were determined by the Brit Awards voting academy with over one-thousand members, which comprised record labels, publishers, managers, agents, media, and previous winners and nominees. The award was first presented in 1977.

Robbie Williams won the award the most times, with four wins.

In 2021, the Brit Awards announced the award was to be replaced with a single award for best artist in order to be more inclusive to non-binary people.

== Winners and nominees ==
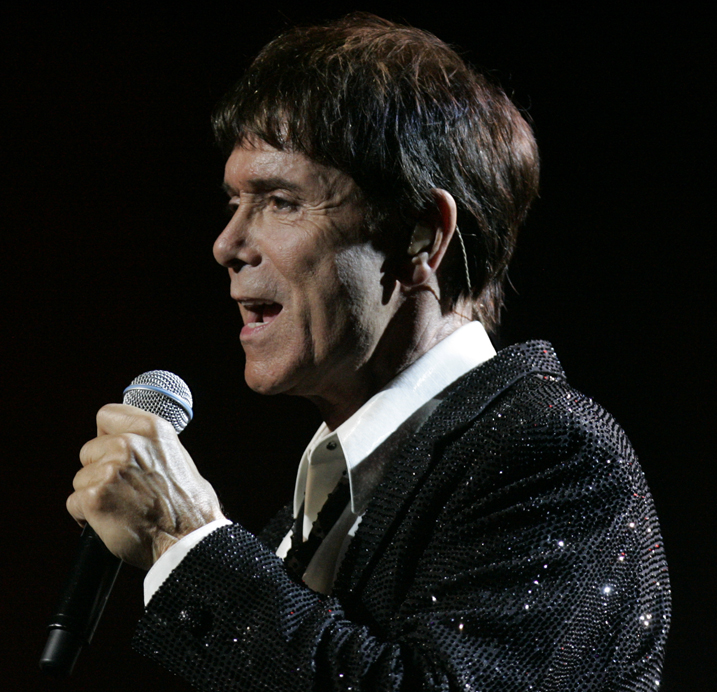
Cliff Richard won the first two awards in 1977 and 1982

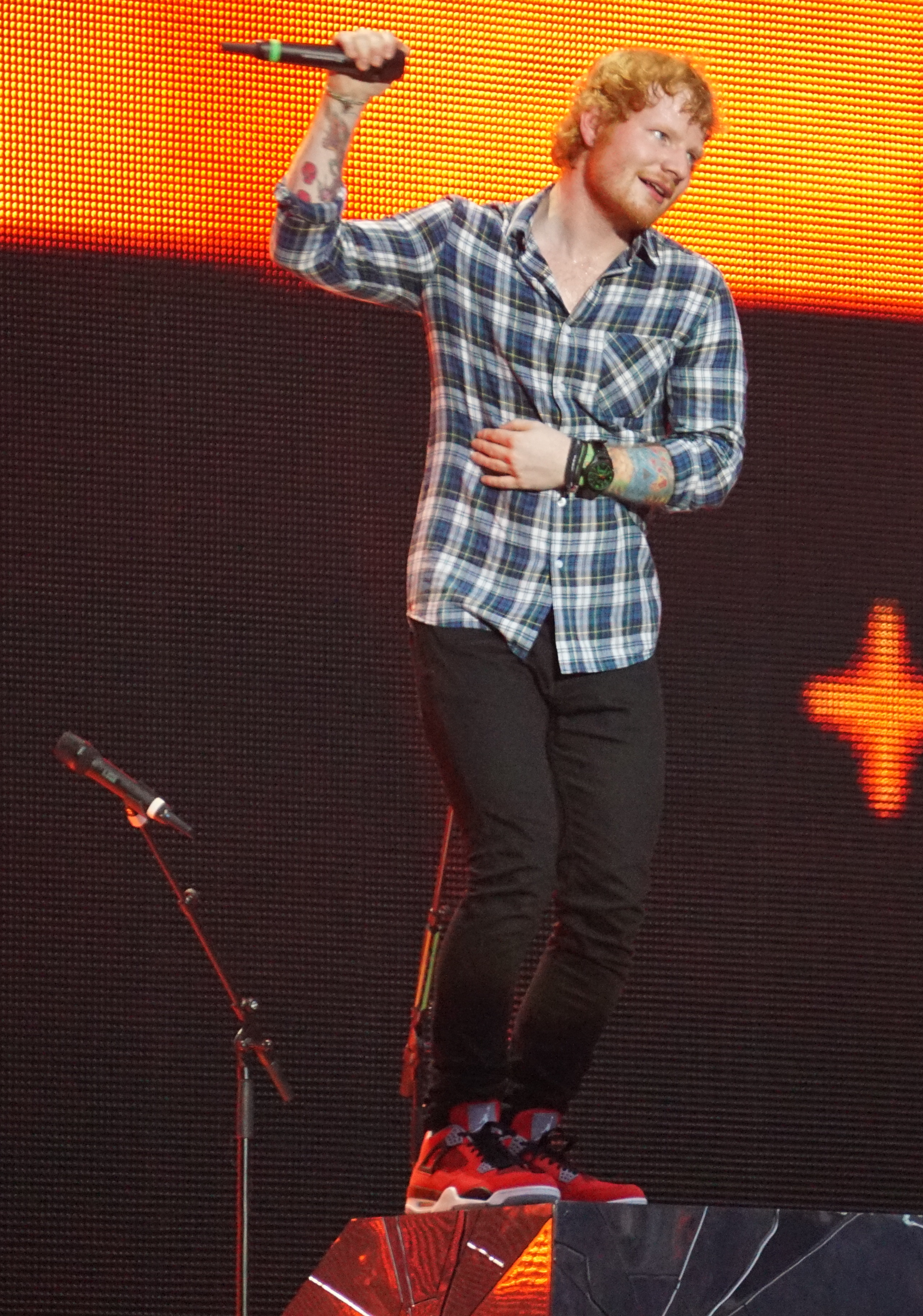
Two-time winner Ed Sheeran

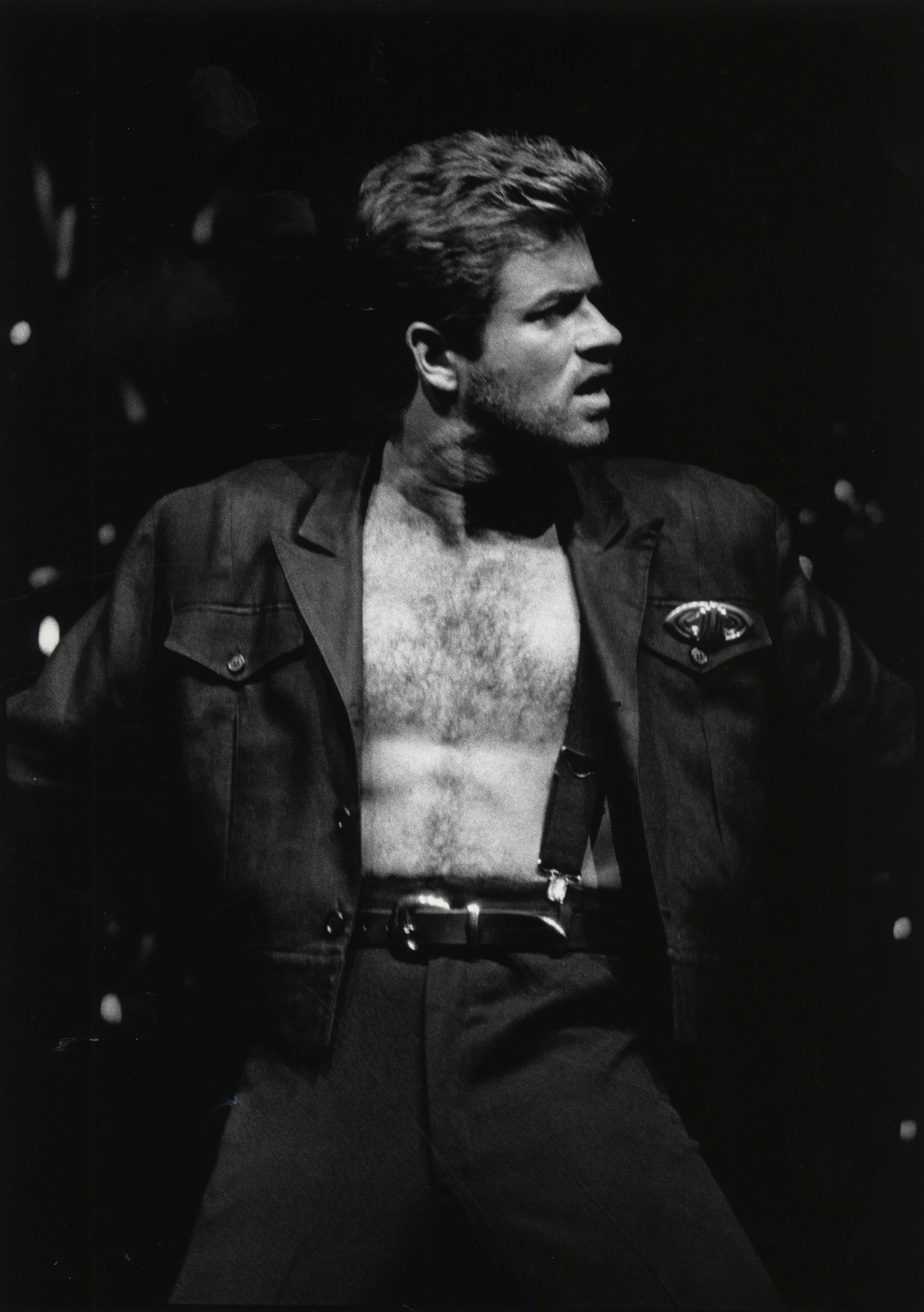
Two-time winner George Michael

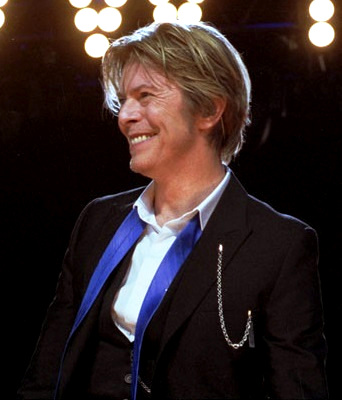
Three-time winner David Bowie

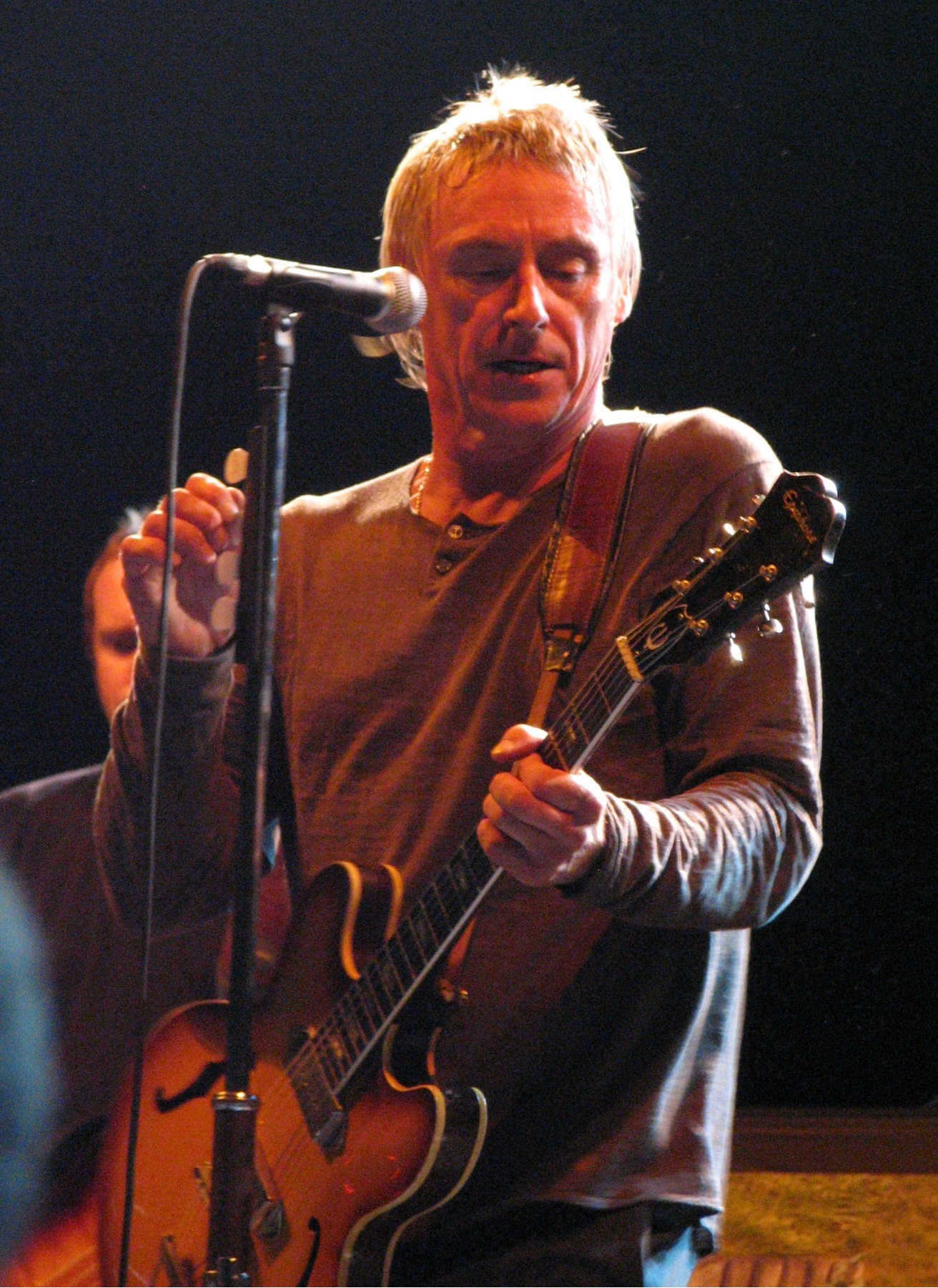
Three-time winner Paul Weller

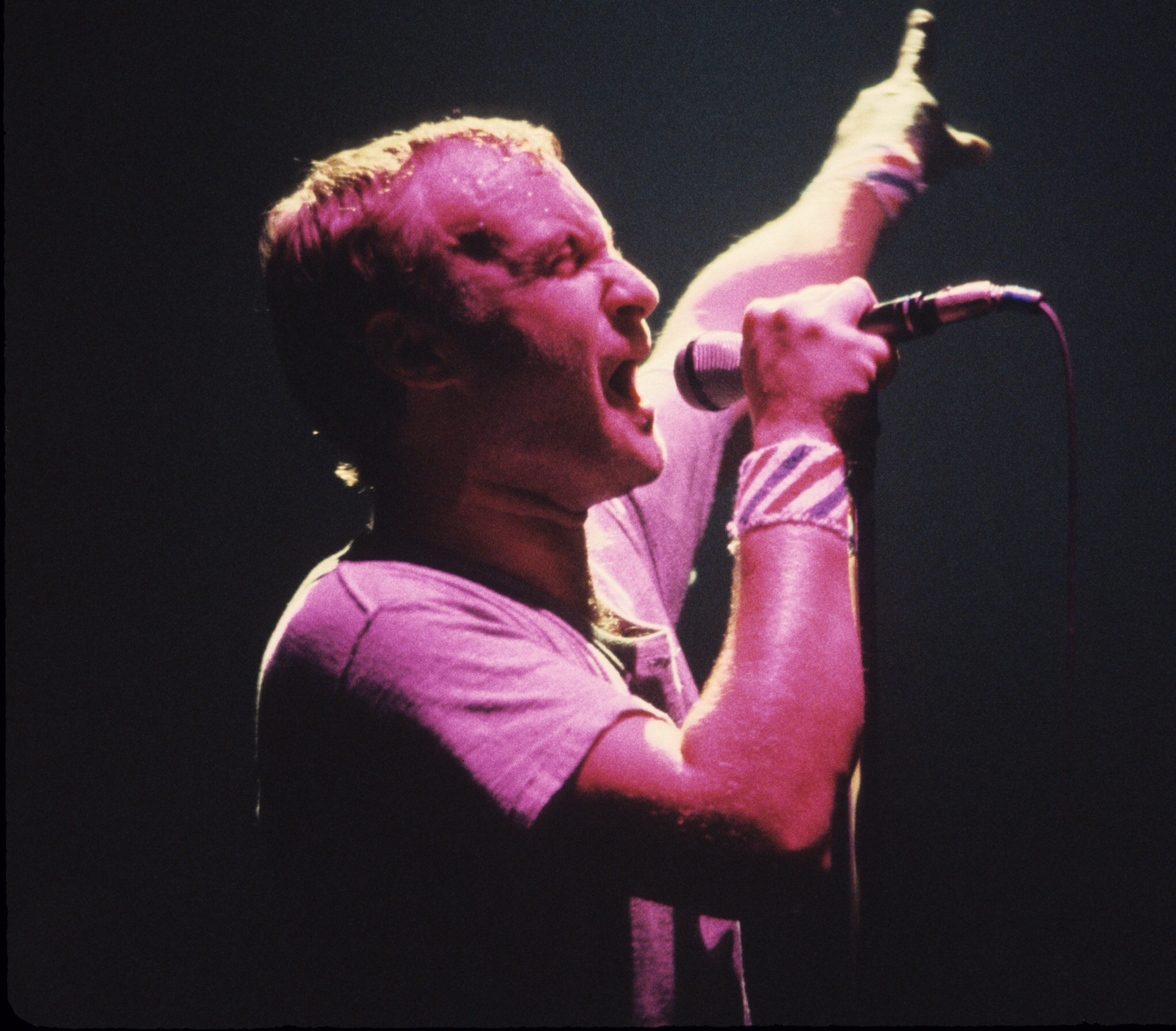
Three-time winner Phil Collins

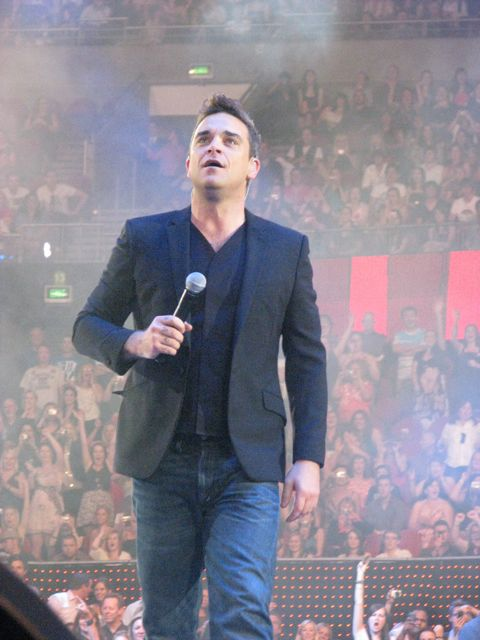
Four-time winner Robbie Williams

Year	Recipient	Nominee
1977 (1st)	Cliff Richard	Elton John; Tom Jones; Rod Stewart
1982 (2nd)	Cliff Richard	Elvis Costello; Shakin' Stevens
1983 (3rd)	Paul McCartney	Phil Collins; Cliff Richard; Shakin' Stevens
1984 (4th)	David Bowie	Elton John; Paul McCartney; Cliff Richard; Paul Young
1985 (5th)	Paul Young	David Bowie; Howard Jones; Nik Kershaw; Paul McCartney
1986 (6th)	Phil Collins	Elton John; Sting; Midge Ure; Paul Young
1987 (7th)	Peter Gabriel	Phil Collins; Chris de Burgh; Billy Ocean; Robert Palmer
1988 (8th)	George Michael	Rick Astley; Chris Rea; Cliff Richard; Steve Winwood
1989 (9th)	Phil Collins	George Michael; Robert Palmer; Chris Rea; Steve Winwood
1990 (10th)	Phil Collins	Roland Gift; Van Morrison; Chris Rea; Cliff Richard
1991 (11th)	Elton John	Phil Collins; George Michael; Van Morrison; Robert Smith; Jimmy Somerville
1992 (12th)	Seal	Phil Collins; Elton John; George Michael; Van Morrison; Kenny Thomas
1993 (10th)	Mick Hucknall	Eric Clapton; Joe Cocker; Phil Collins; Elton John; George Michael
1994 (14th)	Sting	Apache Indian; Van Morrison; Rod Stewart; Paul Weller
1995 (15th)	Paul Weller	Eric Clapton; Elvis Costello; Morrissey; Seal
1996 (16th)	Paul Weller	Edwyn Collins; Van Morrison; Jimmy Nail; Tricky
1997 (17th)	George Michael	Mick Hucknall; Mark Morrison; Sting; Tricky
1998 (18th)	Finley Quaye	Gary Barlow; Elton John; Paul Weller; Robbie Williams
1999 (19th)	Robbie Williams	Ian Brown; Bernard Butler; Fatboy Slim; Lynden David Hall
2000 (20th)	Tom Jones	David Bowie; Ian Brown; Van Morrison; Sting
2001 (21st)	Robbie Williams	Badly Drawn Boy; Craig David; Fatboy Slim; David Gray
2002 (22nd)	Robbie Williams	Aphex Twin; Ian Brown; Craig David; Elton John
2003 (23rd)	Robbie Williams	Badly Drawn Boy; Craig David; David Gray; The Streets
2004 (24th)	Daniel Bedingfield	Badly Drawn Boy; David Bowie; Dizzee Rascal; Will Young
2005 (25th)	The Streets	Jamie Cullum; Lemar; Morrissey; Will Young
2006 (26th)	James Blunt	Antony and the Johnsons (Note: Antony and the Johnsons were nominated in the male category prior to lead singer Anohni coming out as a trans woman.); Ian Brown; Robbie Williams; Will Young
2007 (27th)	James Morrison	Jarvis Cocker; Lemar; Paolo Nutini; Thom Yorke
2008 (28th)	Mark Ronson	Newton Faulkner; Richard Hawley; Jamie T; Mika
2009 (29th)	Paul Weller	Ian Brown; James Morrison; The Streets; Will Young
2010 (30th)	Dizzee Rascal	Calvin Harris; Mika; Paolo Nutini; Robbie Williams
2011 (31st)	Plan B	Robert Plant; Mark Ronson; Tinie Tempah; Paul Weller
2012 (32nd)	Ed Sheeran	James Blake; Noel Gallagher's High Flying Birds; Professor Green; James Morrison
2013 (33rd)	Ben Howard	Calvin Harris; Richard Hawley; Olly Murs; Plan B
2014 (34th)	David Bowie	James Blake; Jake Bugg; John Newman; Tom Odell
2015 (35th)	Ed Sheeran	Damon Albarn; George Ezra; Paolo Nutini; Sam Smith (Note: Smith was nominated in the male category prior to using they/them pronouns in September 2019.)
2016 (36th)	James Bay	Aphex Twin; Calvin Harris; Jamie xx; Mark Ronson
2017 (37th)	David Bowie (Posthumous)	Craig David; Kano; Michael Kiwanuka; Skepta
2018 (38th)	Stormzy	Loyle Carner; Liam Gallagher; Rag'n'Bone Man; Ed Sheeran
2019 (39th)	George Ezra	Aphex Twin; Craig David; Giggs; Sam Smith
2020 (40th)	Stormzy	Lewis Capaldi; Dave; Michael Kiwanuka; Harry Styles
2021 (41st)	J Hus	Joel Corry; Headie One; AJ Tracey; Yungblud

== Artists with multiple wins ==
Artists that received multiple awards
Awards	Artist
4	Robbie Williams
3	David Bowie
3	Phil Collins
3	Paul Weller
2	George Michael
2	Cliff Richard
2	Ed Sheeran
2	Stormzy

== Artists with multiple nominations ==
8 nominations

- Phil Collins
- Elton John

7 nominations

- Robbie Williams

6 nominations

- David Bowie
- George Michael
- Van Morrison
- Cliff Richard
- Paul Weller

5 nominations

- Ian Brown
- Craig David

4 nominations

- Sting
- Will Young

3 nominations

- Aphex Twin
- Badly Drawn Boy
- Calvin Harris
- Paul McCartney
- James Morrison
- Paolo Nutini
- Chris Rea
- Mark Ronson
- Ed Sheeran
- The Streets
- Paul Young

2 nominations

- James Blake
- Elvis Costello
- Eric Clapton
- Dizzee Rascal
- George Ezra
- Fatboy Slim
- David Gray
- Richard Hawley
- Mick Hucknall
- Tom Jones
- Michael Kiwanuka
- Lemar
- Mika
- Morrissey
- Robert Palmer
- Plan B
- Seal
- Sam Smith
- Shakin' Stevens
- Rod Stewart
- Stormzy
- Tricky
- Steve Winwood

== Notes ==
- Paul Young (1984), Ed Sheeran (2012), Ben Howard (2013) also won Brit Award for Best New Artist
- James Bay (2015) also won Brit Award for Rising Star
- Peter Gabriel (1993) also won Brit Award for British Producer of the Year
