= Beautiful World Tour 2007 =

2007 concert tour by Take That

- Tour by Take That
- Location: Europe
- Associated album: Beautiful World
- Start date: 11 October 2007
- End date: 31 December 2007
- Legs: 1
- No. of shows: 50
- Supporting act: Sophie Ellis-Bextor
- Box office: US $40.4 million ($62.73 in 2025 dollars)

Take That concert chronology
- The Ultimate Tour (2006); Beautiful World Tour 2007 (2007); Take That Present: The Circus Live (2009)

The Beautiful World Tour 2007 was the sixth concert tour for the English pop group Take That. The tour ran from 11 October to 31 December 2007, with fifty stops in ten European countries.

A band member chose a band or musician to open the concert each night, including Sophie Ellis-Bextor, who sang at all UK shows except the 31 December concert at The O2 Arena in London. That show, "Countdown to Midnight: Take That & The Sugababes", was filmed for TV and broadcast live on ITV.

== Howard Donald injury ==
Early performances of the tour featured a "dance-off" routine by band members in the middle of the song "Sure". Band member Howard Donald suffered a cracked rib and a collapsed lung during this part of the 26 October show in Vienna. His injuries caused him to miss seven shows and limited his performance in subsequent concerts. He rejoined the band at the 7 November Oberhausen show. Following Donald's injury, the dance off segment was subsequently removed from the show.

== Home media ==
The O2 Arena shows on 6 and 7 December 2007 were recorded. They were released on 25 February 2008 on a limited edition two-disc DVD set, Beautiful World Live, containing behind-the-scenes footage. A Blu-ray version was also released in 2008.

== Tour dates ==
List of 2007 concerts
Date	City	Country	Venue
11 October 2007	Belfast	Northern Ireland	Odyssey Arena
12 October 2007	Belfast	Northern Ireland	Odyssey Arena
14 October 2007	Belfast	Northern Ireland	Odyssey Arena
15 October 2007	Belfast	Northern Ireland	Odyssey Arena
16 October 2007	Belfast	Northern Ireland	Odyssey Arena
20 October 2007	Barcelona	Spain	Palau Sant Jordi
23 October 2007	Bologna	Italy	PalaMalaguti
24 October 2007	Milan	Italy	Datchforum
26 October 2007	Vienna	Austria	Wiener Stadthalle
27 October 2007	Zürich	Switzerland	Hallenstadion
29 October 2007	Cologne	Germany	Kölnarena
31 October 2007	Hamburg	Germany	Color Line Arena
1 November 2007	Rotterdam	Netherlands	Rotterdam Ahoy
3 November 2007	Stuttgart	Germany	Hanns-Martin-Schleyer-Halle
4 November 2007	Berlin	Germany	Velodrom
6 November 2007	Frankfurt	Germany	Festhalle Frankfurt
7 November 2007	Oberhausen	Germany	König Pilsener Arena
9 November 2007	Aalborg	Denmark	Gigantium
10 November 2007	Aalborg	Denmark	Gigantium
11 November 2007	Copenhagen	Denmark	Forum
15 November 2007	Birmingham	England	National Exhibition Centre
16 November 2007	Birmingham	England	National Exhibition Centre
17 November 2007	Birmingham	England	National Exhibition Centre
19 November 2007	Birmingham	England	National Exhibition Centre
20 November 2007	Birmingham	England	National Exhibition Centre
22 November 2007	Glasgow	Scotland	Scottish Exhibition and Conference Centre
23 November 2007	Glasgow	Scotland	Scottish Exhibition and Conference Centre
24 November 2007	Glasgow	Scotland	Scottish Exhibition and Conference Centre
26 November 2007	Newcastle	England	Metro Radio Arena
27 November 2007	Newcastle	England	Metro Radio Arena
29 November 2007	London	England	The O_{2} Arena
30 November 2007	London	England	The O_{2} Arena
1 December 2007	London	England	The O_{2} Arena
3 December 2007	London	England	The O_{2} Arena
4 December 2007	London	England	The O_{2} Arena
6 December 2007	London	England	The O_{2} Arena
7 December 2007	London	England	The O_{2} Arena
8 December 2007	London	England	The O_{2} Arena
10 December 2007	Manchester	England	Manchester Evening News Arena
11 December 2007	Manchester	England	Manchester Evening News Arena
13 December 2007	Manchester	England	Manchester Evening News Arena
14 December 2007	Manchester	England	Manchester Evening News Arena
15 December 2007	Manchester	England	Manchester Evening News Arena
17 December 2007	Manchester	England	Manchester Evening News Arena
18 December 2007	Manchester	England	Manchester Evening News Arena
19 December 2007	Manchester	England	Manchester Evening News Arena
21 December 2007	Manchester	England	Manchester Evening News Arena
22 December 2007	Manchester	England	Manchester Evening News Arena
23 December 2007	Manchester	England	Manchester Evening News Arena
31 December 2007	London	England	The O2 Arena

=== Box office data ===
Venue	City	Tickets sold / available	Gross revenue
National Exhibition Centre	Birmingham, England	55,494 / 55,494 (100%)	$4,812,580
Scottish Exhibition & Conference Centre	Glasgow, Scotland	25,181 / 25,181 (100%)	$2,191,050
Metro Radio Arena	Newcastle, England	18,417 / 18,417 (100%)	$1,600,650
The O2 Arena	London, England	132,835 / 132,835 (100%)	$10,195,810
Manchester Evening News Arena	Manchester, England	158,523 / 158,523 (100%)	$13,651,710
TOTAL		516,450 / 516,450 (100%)	$40,451,800
