= Brit Awards 2007 =

British music awards ceremony

- Date: 14 February 2007
- Venue: Earls Court
- Hosted by: Russell Brand

Highlights
- Most awards: Arctic Monkeys and The Killers (2)
- Most nominations: Lily Allen (4)

Television/radio coverage
- Network: ITV

Brit Awards 2007 was the 27th edition of the Brit Awards, an annual pop music awards ceremony in the United Kingdom. It was organised by the British Phonographic Industry and took place on 14 February 2007 at Earls Court in London. The show, when broadcast, attracted 5.43 million viewers.

The ceremony was hosted by Russell Brand, with Fearne Cotton interviewing winners backstage, and the voiceover by Tom Baker. The show was supposedly being broadcast live for the first time since 1989, on ITV1; however, it was revealed to have been on a 30-second tape delay. The sound occasionally dropped out, apparently in an attempt to censor strong language, although swearing by Liam Gallagher, Simon Pegg, Mark Owen and host Brand was nonetheless audible on the broadcast.

The pre-show was called The BRITs Red Carpet, and was hosted by Lauren Laverne, Matt Willis, Alesha Dixon and Russell Howard. The show that followed was called The BRITs Encore.

== Performances ==
Artist(s)	Song(s)	UK Singles Chart reaction (week ending 24 February 2007)	UK Albums Chart reaction (week ending 24 February 2007)
Scissor Sisters	"I Don't Feel Like Dancin'"	33 (+6)	Ta-Dah – 22 (+9); Scissor Sisters – 86 (+12)
Snow Patrol	"Chasing Cars"	12 (+11)	Eyes Open – 3 (+5); Final Straw – 60 (+14)
Amy Winehouse	"Rehab"	22 (+27)	Back to Black – 2 (+3); Frank – 37 (+18)
The Killers	"When You Were Young"	74 (re-entry)	Sam's Town – 13 (+17); Hot Fuss – 57 (+16)
Take That	"Patience"	10 (+12)	Beautiful World – 5 (+11); Never Forget – The Ultimate Collection – 42 (+10)
Red Hot Chili Peppers	"Dani California"	88 (re-entry)	Stadium Arcadium – 33 (+27)
Corinne Bailey Rae	"Put Your Records On"	93 (re-entry)	Corinne Bailey Rae – 34 (+7)
Oasis	"Cigarettes & Alcohol" "The Meaning of Soul" "Morning Glory" "Don't Look Back in Anger" "Rock 'n' Roll Star"		Stop the Clocks – 20 (+9)

== Winners and nominees ==
British Album of the Year (presented by Sean Bean)	British Single of the Year (presented by Alan Carr)
Arctic Monkeys – Whatever People Say I Am, That's What I'm Not; Amy Winehouse – Back to Black; Lily Allen – Alright, Still; Muse – Black Holes and Revelations; Snow Patrol – Eyes Open	Take That – "Patience"; Razorlight – "America"; Snow Patrol – "Chasing Cars"; The Feeling – "Fill My Little World"; Will Young – "All Time Love"; James Morrison – "You Give Me Something" eliminated on Round 2; Leona Lewis – "A Moment Like This" eliminated on Round 2; Lily Allen – "Smile" eliminated on Round 2; Corinne Bailey Rae – "Put Your Records On" eliminated on Round 1; Sandi Thom – "I Wish I Was a Punk Rocker" eliminated on Round 1; The Kooks – "She Moves in Her Own Way" eliminated on Round 1
British Male Solo Artist (presented by Joss Stone)	British Female Solo Artist (presented by Jo Whiley)
James Morrison; Jarvis Cocker; Lemar; Paolo Nutini; Thom Yorke	Amy Winehouse; Corinne Bailey Rae; Jamelia; Lily Allen; Nerina Pallot
British Group (presented by Anthony Head)	British Breakthrough Act (presented by Jarvis Cocker)
Arctic Monkeys; Kasabian; Muse; Razorlight; Snow Patrol	The Fratellis; Corinne Bailey Rae; James Morrison; The Kooks; Lily Allen
British Live Act (presented by Keith Allen)	International Album (presented by Nick Frost and Simon Pegg)
Muse; George Michael; Guillemots; Kasabian; Robbie Williams	The Killers – Sam's Town; Bob Dylan – Modern Times; Gnarls Barkley – St. Elsewhere; Justin Timberlake – FutureSex/LoveSounds; Scissor Sisters – Ta-Dah
International Male Solo Artist (presented by Erin O'Connor and Roland Mouret)	International Female Solo Artist (presented by Ricky Wilson)
Justin Timberlake; Beck; Bob Dylan; Damien Rice; Jack Johnson	Nelly Furtado; Beyoncé; Cat Power; Christina Aguilera; Pink
International Group (presented by Steven Tyler and Sophie Ellis-Bextor)	International Breakthrough Act (presented by Toni Collette)
The Killers; The Flaming Lips; Gnarls Barkley; Red Hot Chili Peppers; Scissor Sisters	Orson; Gnarls Barkley; The Raconteurs; Ray Lamontagne; Wolfmother

=== Outstanding Contribution to Music ===
- Oasis (presented by Russell Brand)

== Multiple nominations and awards ==
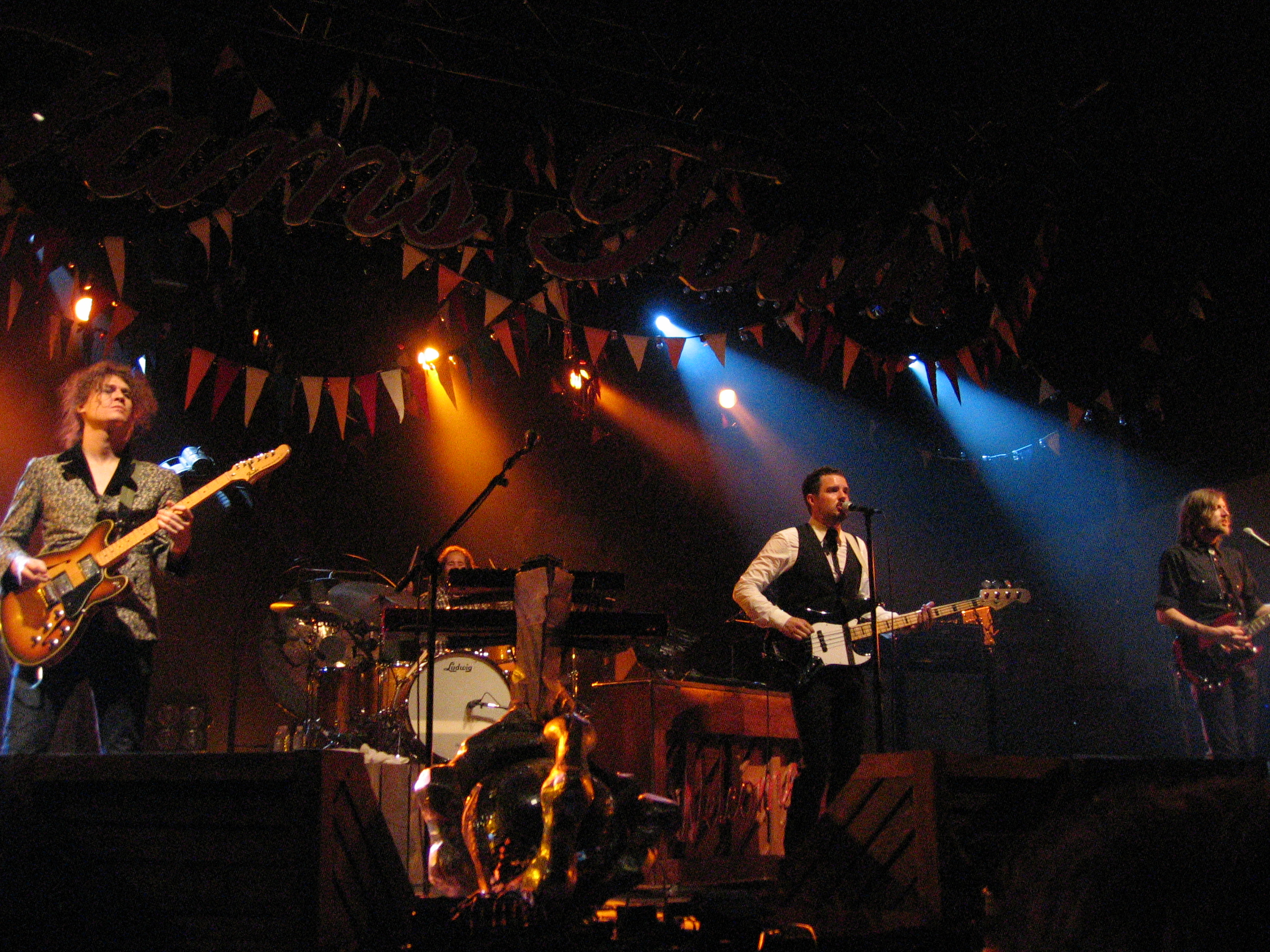
Two-time winner The Killers

Artists that received multiple nominations
Nominations	Artist
4	Lily Allen
3 (5)	Corinne Bailey Rae
3 (5)	Gnarls Barkley
3 (5)	James Morrison
3 (5)	Muse
3 (5)	Snow Patrol
2 (8)	Amy Winehouse
2 (8)	Arctic Monkeys
2 (8)	Bob Dylan
2 (8)	Justin Timberlake
2 (8)	Kasabian
2 (8)	The Killers
2 (8)	Razorlight
2 (8)	Scissor Sisters

Artists that received multiple awards
Awards	Artist
2 (2)	Arctic Monkeys
2 (2)	The Killers

== Moments ==
=== Russell Brand ===
Some controversy was caused by the host of the 2007 ceremony, comedian Russell Brand, who made several quips relating to news stories of the time including singer Robbie Williams' entering rehabilitation for addiction to prescription drugs, the Queen's 'naughty bits' and a fatal friendly fire incident involving a British soldier killed by American armed forces in Iraq. ITV1 received over 300 complaint calls from viewers. He would again instigate controversy the following year at the 2008 MTV Video Music Awards.
