= Patience (Take That song) =

2006 single by Take That

Single by Take That

from the album Beautiful World
- B-side: "Beautiful Morning"
- Released: 13 November 2006
- Length: 3:20
- Label: Polydor
- Songwriters: Gary Barlow; Howard Donald; Jason Orange; Mark Owen; John Shanks
- Producer: John Shanks

Take That singles chronology
"How Deep Is Your Love" (1996)	"Patience" (2006)	"Shine" (2007)

Music video
- "Patience" on YouTube

"Patience" is a song by English boy band Take That. It was released on 13 November 2006 as the lead single from their comeback album, Beautiful World (2006). The single peaked at the top of the UK Singles Chart, and also topped the charts in Germany, Italy, Spain and Switzerland, as well as peaking in the top ten of multiple charts and charting internationally. The song topped the Eurochart Hot 100 for six consecutive weeks. The accompanying music video, directed by David Mould, was filmed in Iceland.

== Reception and legacy ==
"Patience" won the Best British Single Award at the 2007 BRIT Awards and was voted The Record of the Year for 2006, polling 15.5% of the final vote. In 2009, Nicky Wire of the Manic Street Preachers hailed "Patience" as "the greatest comeback single in history. If Neil Young had written it, people would be calling it a masterpiece." He praised the dark lyrics of the chorus and concluded: "You get so many alternative bands banging on about how to make perfect pop, and ['Patience'] kicks all their arses." Tom Eames of Digital Spy felt similarly, saying in a 2016 article that "'Patience' remains one of pop's greatest ever comeback songs." In 2015, Kitty Empire of The Guardian wrote that the song "remains one of the strongest songs [Take That] have ever put out."

== Chart performance ==
"Patience" debuted at number four on the UK Singles Chart and rose to number one in its second week, staying there for four weeks. It just missed out on being the UK Christmas number one of 2006, being knocked off the top spot on Christmas Eve by The X Factor winner Leona Lewis' "A Moment Like This". It was the UK's eighth-best-selling single of 2006 despite only having less than two months' worth of sales. The song spent eleven weeks in the top ten, making it the longest that any Take That single had spent in the top ten until the release of 2007's "Rule the World". The song also became the 30th-best-selling single of 2007, the following year. The song was Ireland's 20th-best-selling single of 2006.

On 18 February 2007, it re-entered the UK top 10 after 14 weeks in the charts and on 11 August 2007, following the band's performance at the Concert for Diana, the single reentered the UK top 40. The song debuted at number one on the German Singles Chart, and since its release it has sold over 150,000 copies being certified Gold by the IFPI. The song, as of October 2023, has sold 1.2 million copies in the UK.

== Music video ==
The music video for "Patience" was directed by David Mould and was shot in Iceland. The video shows each of the members trekking across the rough terrain dragging their microphone stands. After the middle eight, the band are shown on top of a cliff singing the song together at night whilst a storm occurs behind them.

== Track listings ==
Digital download single

1. "Patience" – 3:20

UK CD single

1. "Patience" – 3:20
2. "Beautiful Morning" – 3:37

Worldwide (except UK) maxi single and UK iTunes E.P.

1. "Patience" – 3:20
2. "Beautiful Morning" – 3:37
3. "Trouble With Me" – 3:24
4. "Patience" (video) – 3:21

== Personnel ==
- Gary Barlow – lead vocals
- Howard Donald – backing vocals
- Jason Orange – backing vocals
- Mark Owen – backing vocals
- John Shanks - guitars, keyboards, synth, bass, producer

== Charts ==
=== Weekly charts ===
2006–2007 weekly chart performance for "Patience"
Chart (2006–2007)	Peak position
Australia (ARIA)	29
Austria (Ö3 Austria Top 40)	4
Belgium (Ultratop 50 Flanders)	24
Belgium (Ultratip Bubbling Under Wallonia)	2
Canada Hot 100 (Billboard)	21
Canada AC (Billboard)	24
Canada Hot AC (Billboard)	10
CIS Airplay (TopHit)	16
Czech Republic Airplay (ČNS IFPI)	6
Denmark (Tracklisten)	6
Denmark Airplay (Tracklisten)	2
Europe (Eurochart Hot 100)	1
Europe (Euro Digital Song Sales)	1
Europe (European Hit Radio)	3
Finland (Suomen virallinen latauslista)	10
Finland Airplay (Radiosoittolista)	1
France Airplay (SNEP)	12
Germany (GfK)	1
Germany Airplay (BVMI)	1
Hungary (Single Top 40)	32
Hungary (Rádiós Top 40)	2
Ireland (IRMA)	2
Italy (FIMI)	2
Italy (Musica e dischi)	1
Latvia (Latvijas Top 40)	5
Netherlands (Dutch Top 40)	18
Netherlands (Single Top 100)	12
Norway (VG-lista)	14
Portugal (AFP)	5
Romania (Romanian Top 100)	15
Russia Airplay (TopHit)	14
Scottish Singles Sales (Official Charts)	1
Slovakia Airplay (ČNS IFPI)	7
Spain (Promusicae)	1
Spain Airplay (Top 40 Radio)	1
Sweden (Sverigetopplistan)	6
Switzerland (Schweizer Hitparade)	1
Switzerland Airplay (Swiss Hitparade)	1
Ukraine Airplay (TopHit)	51
UK Singles (Official Charts)	1
UK Airplay (Music Week)	1

2014 weekly chart performance for "Patience"
Chart (2014)	Peak position
UK Singles (OCC)	99

2026 weekly chart performance for "Patience"
Chart (2026)	Peak position
UK Singles Downloads (Official Charts)	73
UK Singles Sales (OCC)	80

=== Year-end charts ===
2006 year-end chart performance for "Patience"
Chart (2006)	Position
CIS Airplay (TopHit)	163
Europe (European Hit Radio)	63
Germany (Media Control GfK)	89
Ireland (IRMA)	20
Italy (FIMI)	65
Netherlands (Dutch Top 40)	170
Russia Airplay (TopHit)	154
Sweden (Hitlistan)	50
Switzerland (Schweizer Hitparade)	40
UK Singles (OCC)	8
UK Airplay (Music Week)	42

2007 year-end chart performance for "Patience"
Chart (2007)	Position
CIS Airplay (TopHit)	166
Europe (Eurochart Hot 100)	21
Germany (Media Control GfK)	35
Hungary (Rádiós Top 40)	39
Italy (FIMI)	41
Italy (Musica e dischi)	7
Netherlands (Dutch Top 40)	166
Netherlands (Single Top 100)	96
Romania (Romanian Top 100)	97
Russia Airplay (TopHit)	154
Switzerland (Schweizer Hitparade)	33
Taiwan (Hito Radio)	58
UK Singles (OCC)	30
UK Airplay (Music Week)	12

2008 year-end chart performance for "Patience"
Chart (2008)	Position
UK Airplay (Music Week)	75

=== Decade-end charts ===
Decade-end chart performance for "Patience"
Chart (2000–2009)	Position
UK Singles (OCC)	57

== Certifications ==
Certifications and sales for "Patience"
Region	Certification	Certified units/sales
Denmark (IFPI Danmark)	Platinum	8,000^{^}
Germany (BVMI)	Gold	150,000^{^}
United Kingdom (BPI)	2× Platinum	1,200,000^{‡}
^{^} Shipments figures based on certification alone.^{‡} Sales+streaming figures based on certification alone.

== Cover versions ==
Indie-rock band The Wombats also chose to cover this song on 9 January 2008 for BBC Radio 1's Live Lounge. Hank Marvin also covered this song on his 2007 album Guitar Man and Nick Lachey released a version as a single in the US.
