= Brit Awards 1977 =

British music awards ceremony

- Date: 18 October 1977
- Venue: Wembley Conference Centre
- Hosted by: Michael Aspel
- Most awards: The Beatles (3)
- Most nominations: The Beatles (3)

Television/radio coverage
- Network: ITV

The Brit Awards 1977 was a United Kingdom popular music award special event to mark both 100 years since Thomas Edison invented the phonograph and the Silver Jubilee of Elizabeth II. The awards were given for the previous 25 years of her reign. It was originally named "The British Record Industry Britannia Awards", and was the first event of the Brit Awards, which became an annual event after 1982. The event was organised and run by the British Phonographic Industry, was broadcast by the ITV television network and took place on 18 October 1977 at Wembley Conference Centre in London. The host was Michael Aspel.

== Winners and nominees ==
British Pop Album	British Producer
The Beatles – Sgt. Pepper's Lonely Hearts Club Band; Elton John – Goodbye Yellow Brick Road; Pink Floyd – The Dark Side of the Moon; Mike Oldfield – Tubular Bells	George Martin; Glyn Johns; Gus Dudgeon; Mickie Most
British Pop Single	Outstanding Contributions to the Recording Industry
Procol Harum – "A Whiter Shade of Pale" and Queen – "Bohemian Rhapsody"; 10cc – "I'm Not in Love"; The Beatles – "She Loves You"	The Beatles and L. G. Wood
British Male Solo Artist	British Female Solo Artist
Cliff Richard; Elton John; Rod Stewart; Tom Jones	Shirley Bassey; Cleo Laine; Dusty Springfield; Petula Clark
British Pop Group	Most Promising New Artist
The Beatles; Pink Floyd; The Rolling Stones; The Who	Graham Parker and Julie Covington; Bonnie Tyler; Heatwave
British Classical Orchestral LP	International Pop LP
Benjamin Britten – War Requiem; Adrian Boult – The Planets; Georg Solti – Der Ring des Nibelungen; Oliver Knussen – War Requiem; Otto Klemperer – Beethoven Symphonies	Simon & Garfunkel – Bridge over Troubled Water; ABBA – Arrival; Carole King – Tapestry; Stevie Wonder – Songs in the Key of Life
British Classical Soloist LP	British Non-Musical Recording
Jacqueline du Pré – Cello Concerto; Dennis Brain - Mozart Horn Concertos	Richard Burton – Under Milk Wood

== Multiple nominations and awards ==
The following artists received multiple awards and/or nominations, not counting Outstanding Contribution to Music.

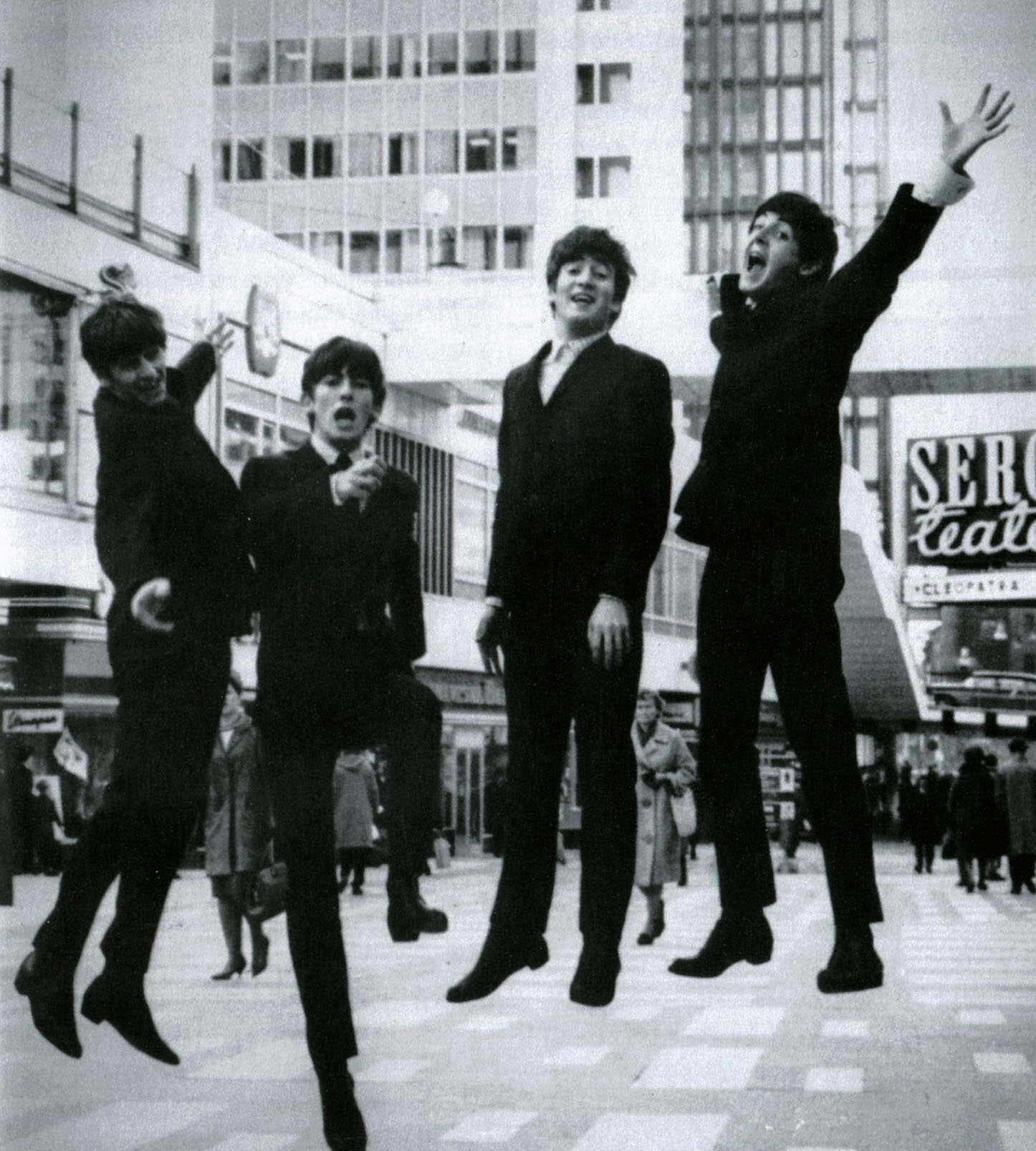
Two-time winner The Beatles

Artists who received multiple nominations
Nominations	Artist
3	The Beatles
2	Elton John
2	Pink Floyd

Artists who received multiple awards
Awards	Artist
2	The Beatles
