= Brit Award for British Female Solo Artist =

British music award

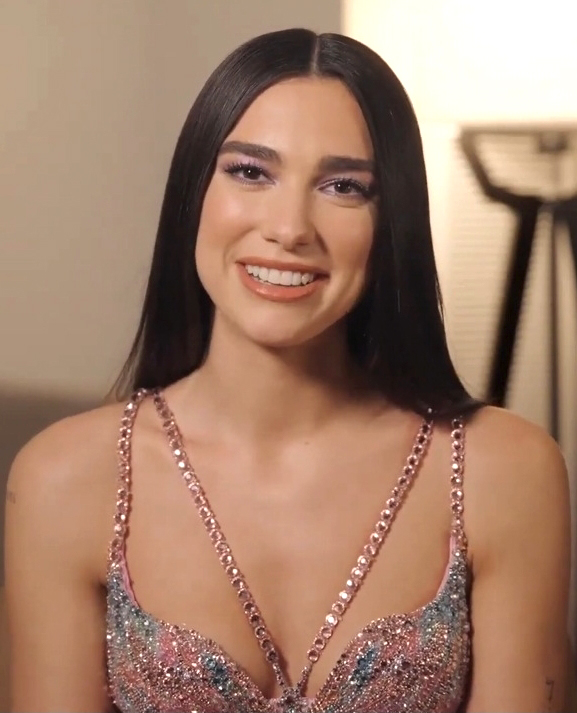
- 2021 Winner Dua Lipa
- Awarded for: Achievement in excellent British female solo artist
- Country: United Kingdom (UK)
- Presented by: British Phonographic Industry (BPI)
- First award: 1977
- Final award: 2021
- Currently held by: Dua Lipa (2021)

Highlights
- Most awards: Annie Lennox (6)
- Most nominations: Annie Lennox (9)
- Website: www.brits.co.uk

The Brit Award for British Female Solo Artist was an award given by the British Phonographic Industry (BPI), an organisation which represents record companies and artists in the United Kingdom. The accolade was presented at the Brit Awards, an annual celebration of British and international music. The winners and nominees are determined by the Brit Awards voting academy with over one-thousand members, which comprise record labels, publishers, managers, agents, media, and previous winners and nominees. The award was first presented in 1977 as British Female Solo Artist and for the last time in 2021, as gendered categories have been dropped for 2022.

Annie Lennox holds the record for most wins in this category (six, including four as the vocalist of Eurythmics). Lennox also has the most nominations with nine, followed by Kate Bush with eight.

As international artist categories only began in 1989, American singer Randy Crawford won the award in 1982.

== Winners and nominees ==
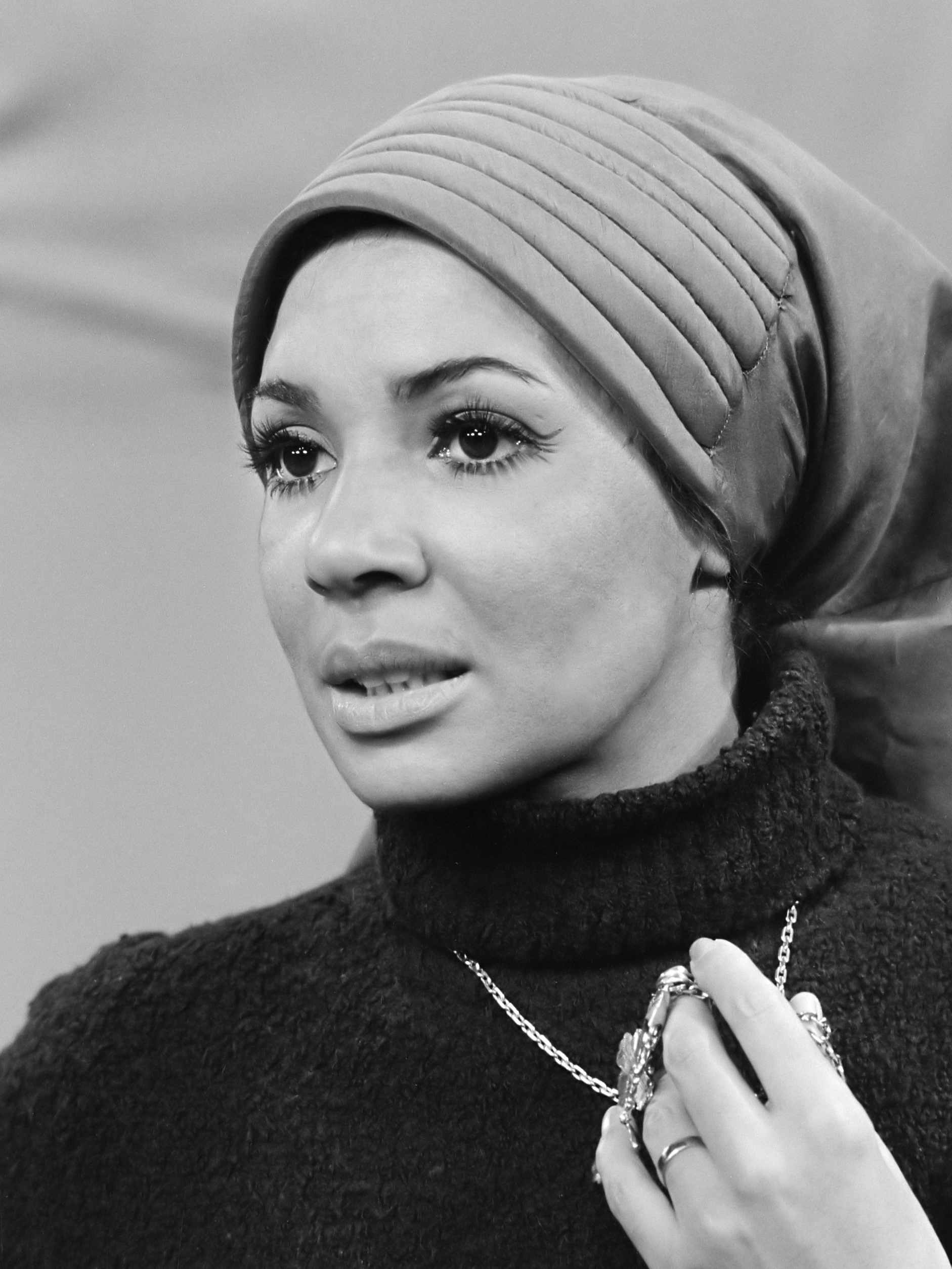
Inaugural winner Shirley Bassey

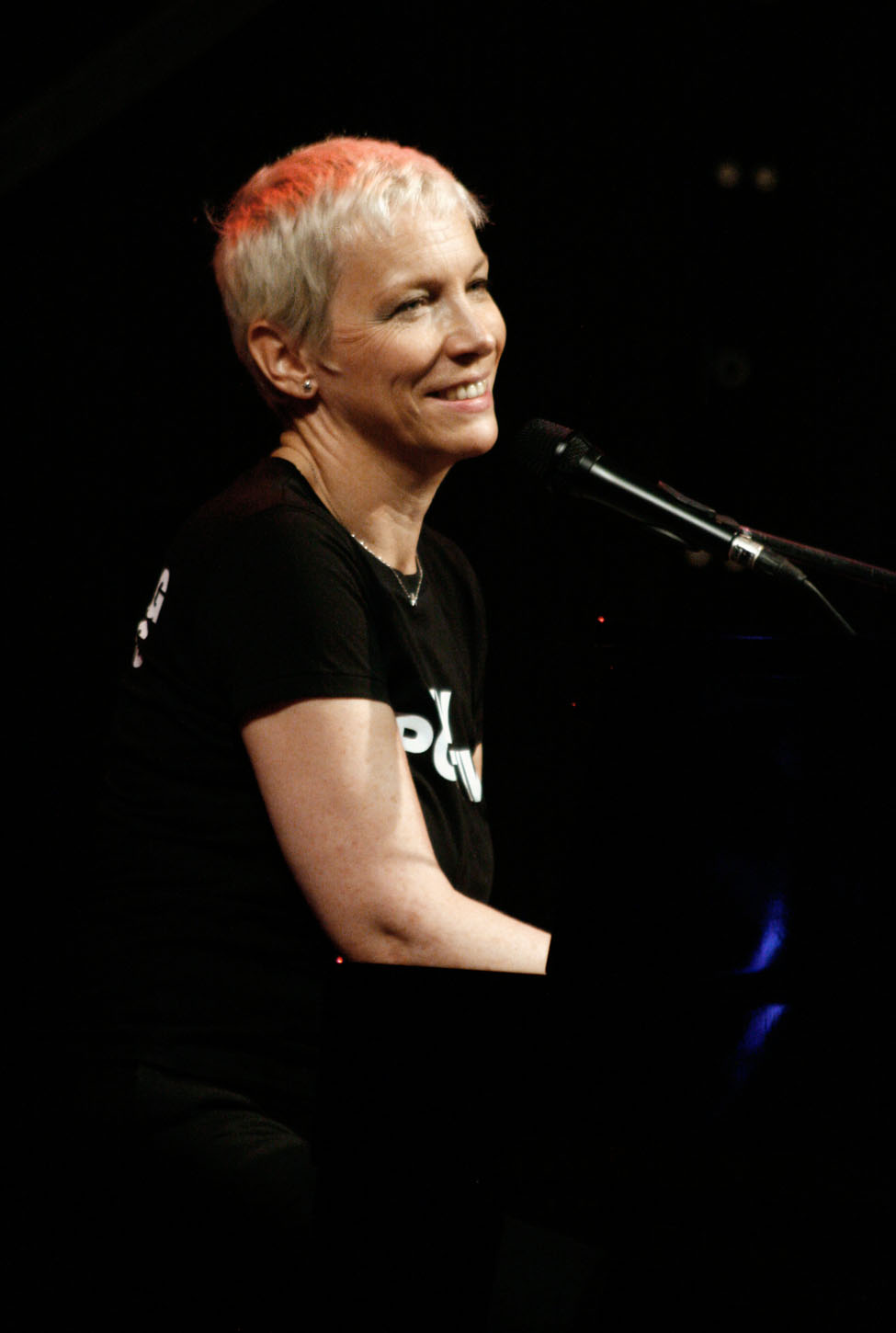
Six-time winner Annie Lennox

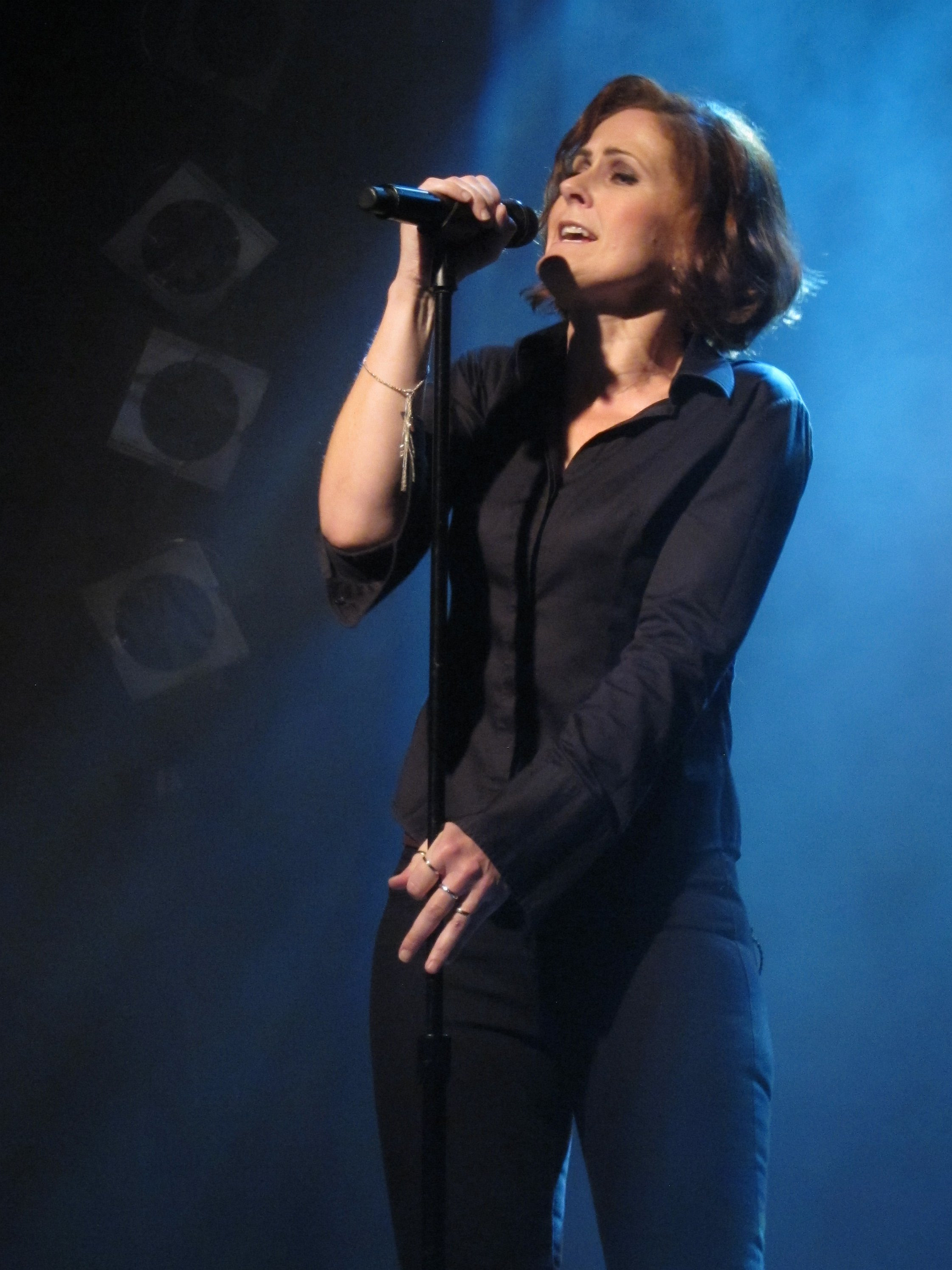
Two-time winner Alison Moyet

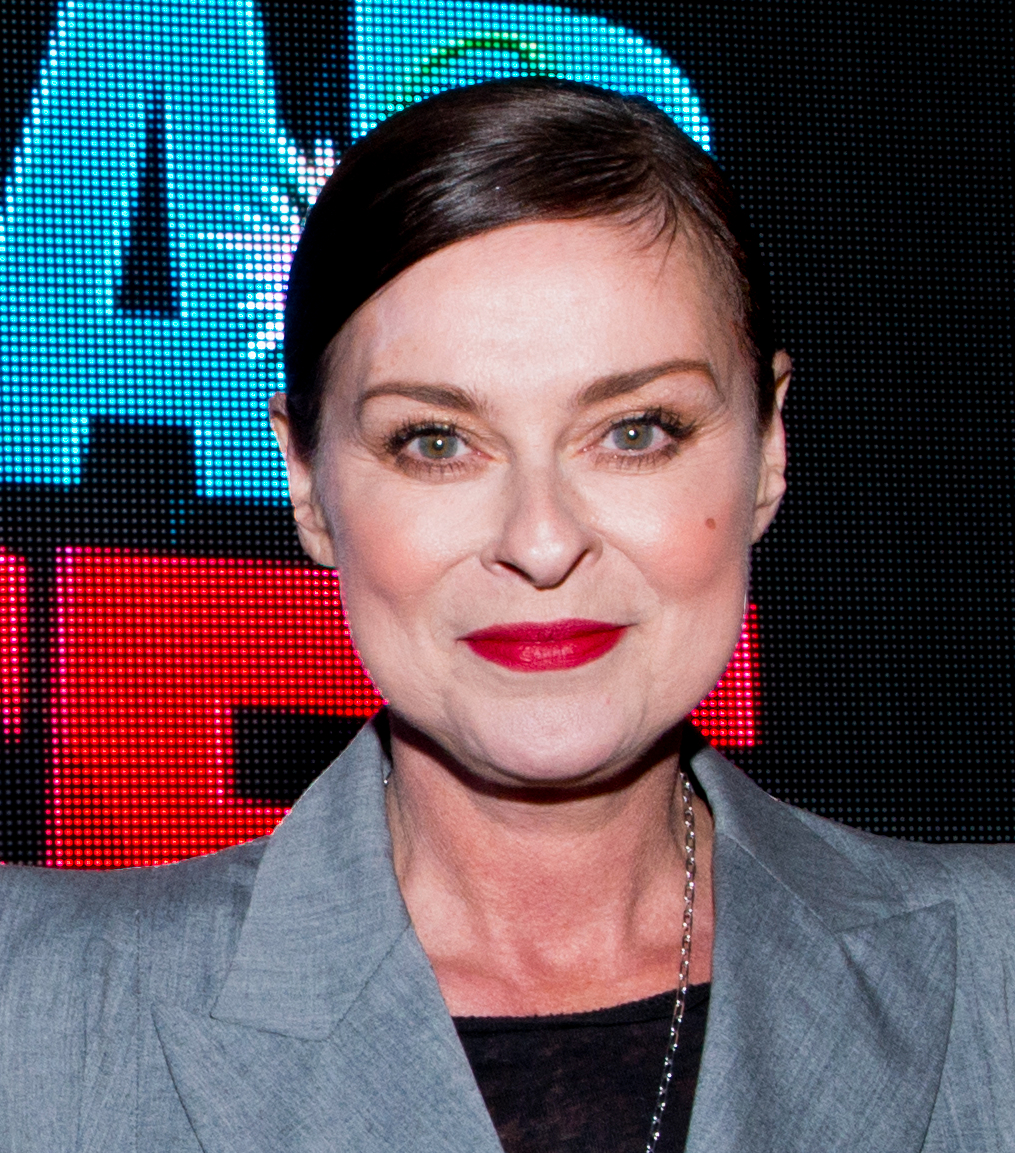
Two-time winner Lisa Stansfield

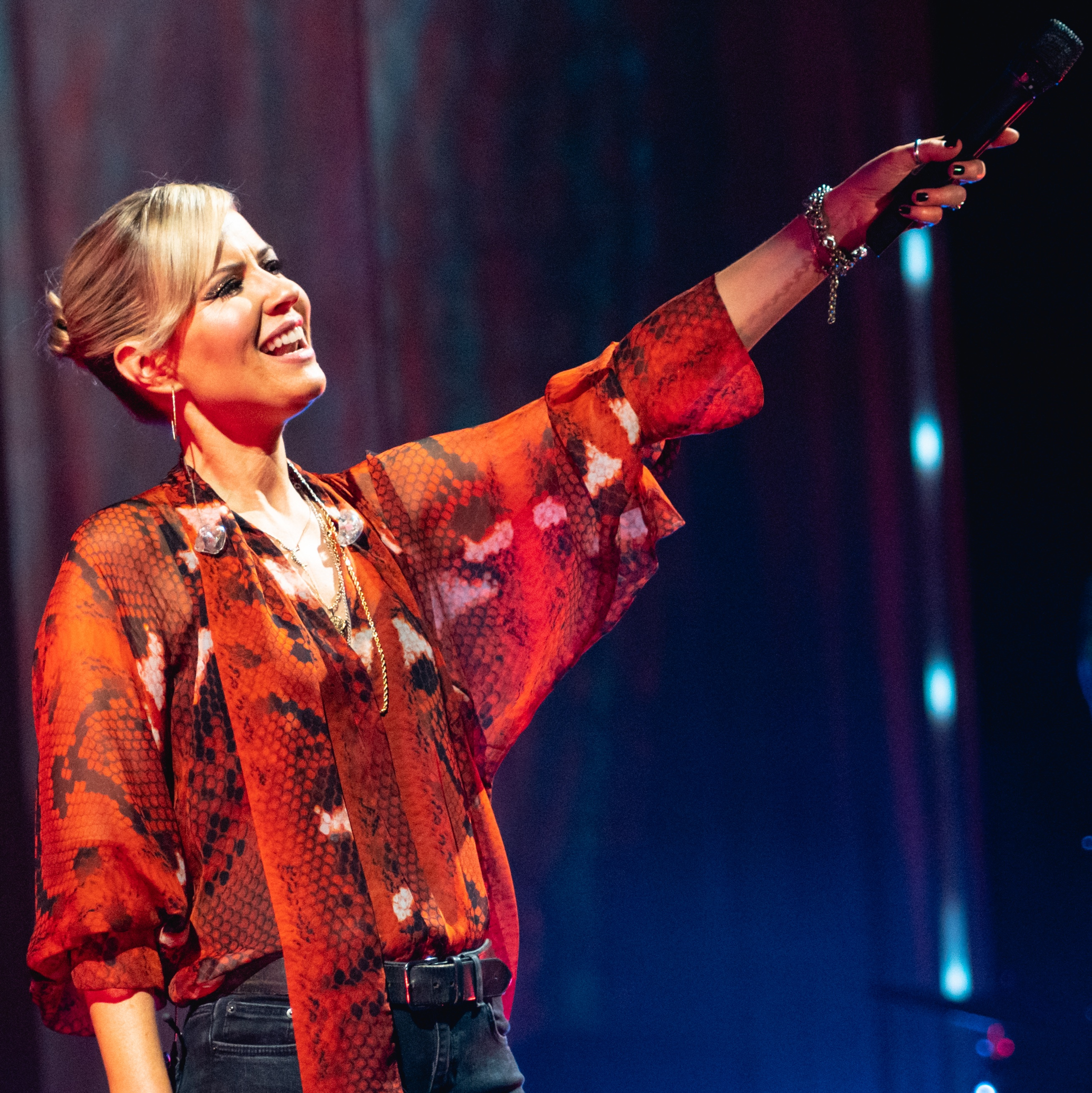
Two-time winner Dido

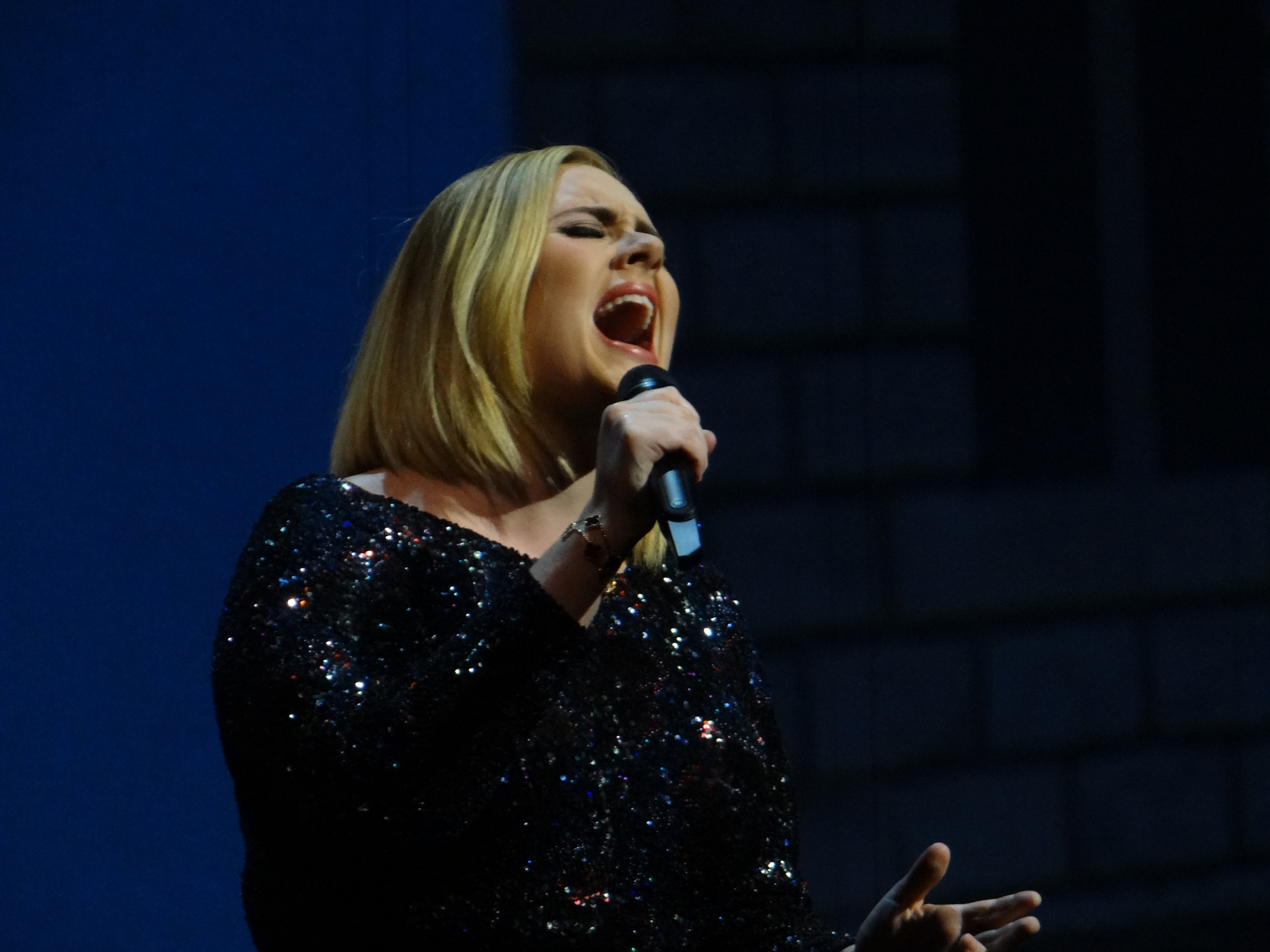
Two-time winner Adele

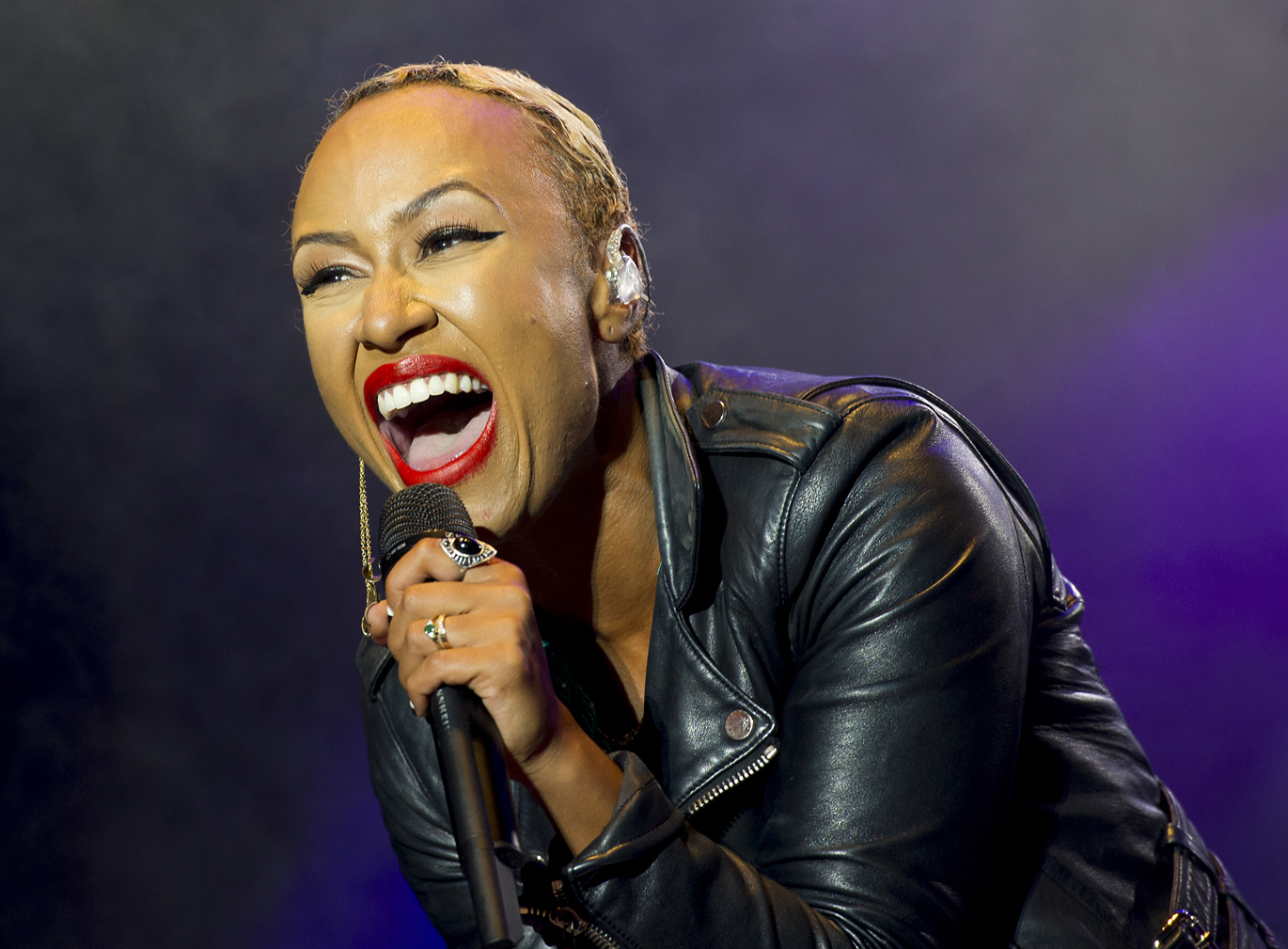
Two-time winner Emeli Sandé

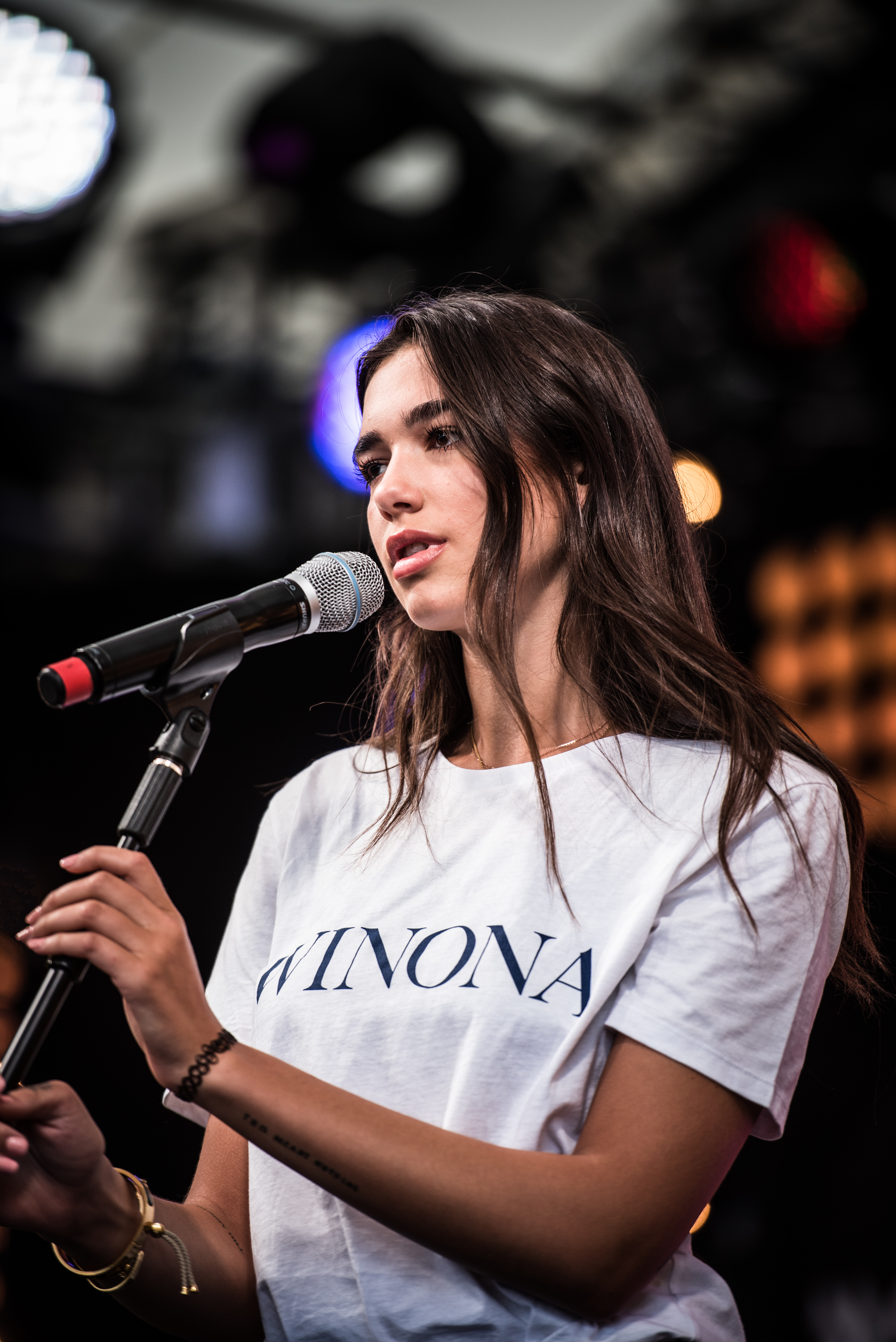
Two-time winner Dua Lipa

Year	Recipient	Nominees
1977 (1st)	Shirley Bassey	Petula Clark Cleo Laine Dusty Springfield
1982 (2nd)	Randy Crawford	Sheena Easton Toyah Willcox
1983 (3rd)	Kim Wilde	Sheena Easton Toyah Willcox Mari Wilson
1984 (4th)	Annie Lennox	Alison Moyet Bonnie Tyler Tracey Ullman Toyah Willcox
1985 (5th)	Alison Moyet	Sade Adu Annie Lennox Tracey Ullman Kim Wilde
1986 (6th)	Annie Lennox	Sade Adu Kate Bush Alison Moyet Bonnie Tyler
1987 (7th)	Kate Bush	Sade Adu Joan Armatrading Jaki Graham Kim Wilde
1988 (8th)	Alison Moyet	Kate Bush Samantha Fox Sinitta Kim Wilde
1989 (9th)	Annie Lennox	Sade Adu Mica Paris Tanita Tikaram Yazz
1990 (10th)	Annie Lennox	Kate Bush Mica Paris Lisa Stansfield Yazz
1991 (11th)	Lisa Stansfield	Betty Boo Elizabeth Fraser Dusty Springfield Caron Wheeler
1992 (12th)	Lisa Stansfield	Beverley Craven Cathy Dennis Annie Lennox Zoë
1993 (13th)	Annie Lennox	Tasmin Archer Kate Bush Siobhan Fahey Lisa Stansfield
1994 (14th)	Dina Carroll	Beverley Craven Gabrielle PJ Harvey Shara Nelson
1995 (15th)	Eddi Reader	Kate Bush Des'ree Michelle Gayle Lisa Stansfield
1996 (16th)	Annie Lennox	Joan Armatrading PJ Harvey Shara Nelson Vanessa-Mae
1997 (17th)	Gabrielle	Dina Carroll Donna Lewis Eddi Reader Louise Redknapp
1998 (18th)	Shola Ama	Michelle Gayle Beth Orton Louise Redknapp Lisa Stansfield
1999 (19th)	Des'ree	PJ Harvey Hinda Hicks Billie Myers Billie Piper
2000 (20th)	Beth Orton	Gabrielle; Geri Halliwell; Beverley Knight; Melanie C
2001 (21st)	Sonique	Sade Adu; Dido; PJ Harvey; Jamelia
2002 (22nd)	Dido	Sade Adu; Sophie Ellis-Bextor; Geri Halliwell; PJ Harvey
2003 (23rd)	Ms. Dynamite	Sophie Ellis-Bextor; Beverley Knight; Alison Moyet; Beth Orton
2004 (24th)	Dido	Sophie Ellis-Bextor; Jamelia; Annie Lennox; Amy Winehouse
2005 (25th)	Joss Stone	Natasha Bedingfield; PJ Harvey; Jamelia; Amy Winehouse
2006 (26th)	KT Tunstall	Natasha Bedingfield; Kate Bush; Charlotte Church; Katie Melua
2007 (27th)	Amy Winehouse	Lily Allen; Corinne Bailey Rae; Jamelia; Nerina Pallot
2008 (28th)	Kate Nash	Bat for Lashes; PJ Harvey; Leona Lewis; KT Tunstall
2009 (29th)	Duffy	Adele; Estelle; M.I.A.; Beth Rowley
2010 (30th)	Lily Allen	Bat for Lashes; Florence and the Machine; Leona Lewis; Pixie Lott
2011 (31st)	Laura Marling	Cheryl; Paloma Faith; Ellie Goulding; Rumer
2012 (32nd)	Adele	Kate Bush; Florence and the Machine; Jessie J; Laura Marling
2013 (33rd)	Emeli Sandé	Bat for Lashes; Paloma Faith; Jessie Ware; Amy Winehouse (Posthumous)
2014 (34th)	Ellie Goulding	Birdy; Jessie J; Laura Marling; Laura Mvula
2015 (35th)	Paloma Faith	Lily Allen; Ella Henderson; FKA Twigs; Jessie Ware
2016 (36th)	Adele	Florence and the Machine; Jess Glynne; Laura Marling; Amy Winehouse (Posthumous)
2017 (37th)	Emeli Sandé	Anohni; Ellie Goulding; Lianne La Havas; Nao
2018 (38th)	Dua Lipa	Paloma Faith; Laura Marling; Kae Tempest (Note: Tempest was nominated in the female category prior to coming out as a trans man.); Jessie Ware
2019 (39th)	Jorja Smith	Lily Allen; Anne-Marie; Florence and the Machine; Jess Glynne
2020 (40th)	Mabel	Charli XCX; Mahalia; Freya Ridings; FKA Twigs
2021 (41st)	Dua Lipa	Celeste; Lianne La Havas; Arlo Parks; Jessie Ware

== Artists with multiple wins ==
Artists that received multiple awards
Awards	Artist
6	Annie Lennox
2	Adele
2	Dido
2	Dua Lipa
2	Alison Moyet
2	Emeli Sandé
2	Lisa Stansfield

== Artists with multiple nominations ==
9 nominations

- Annie Lennox

8 nominations

- Kate Bush

7 nominations

- PJ Harvey

6 nominations

- Sade
- Lisa Stansfield

5 nominations

- Laura Marling
- Alison Moyet
- Amy Winehouse

4 nominations

- Lily Allen
- Paloma Faith
- Florence and the Machine
- Jamelia
- Jessie Ware
- Kim Wilde

3 nominations

- Adele
- Bat for Lashes
- Dido
- Sophie Ellis-Bextor
- Gabrielle
- Ellie Goulding
- Beth Orton
- Toyah Willcox

2 nominations

- Joan Armatrading
- Natasha Bedingfield
- Dina Carroll
- Beverley Craven
- Des'ree
- Sheena Easton
- Michelle Gayle
- Jess Glynne
- Geri Halliwell
- Jessie J
- Beverley Knight
- Lianne La Havas
- Leona Lewis
- Dua Lipa
- Shara Nelson
- Mica Paris
- Eddi Reader
- Louise Redknapp
- Emeli Sandé
- Dusty Springfield
- KT Tunstall
- FKA Twigs
- Bonnie Tyler
- Tracey Ullman
- Yazz

== See also ==
- List of music awards honoring women

== Notes ==
- Lisa Stansfield (1990), Duffy (2009), Dua Lipa (2018) also won Brit Award for Best New Artist
- Adele (2008), Ellie Goulding (2010), Emeli Sandé (2012) also won Brit Award for Rising Star
- Ms. Dynamite (2003), Joss Stone (2005) also won Brit Award for British Urban Act
