= I'd Wait for Life =

Single by Take That

from the album Beautiful World
- B-side: "We All Fall Down"
- Released: 18 June 2007
- Recorded: 2006
- Genre: Pop
- Length: 4:34 (album version); 4:11 (radio edit)
- Label: Polydor
- Songwriter: Take That
- Producer: John Shanks

Take That singles chronology
"Shine" (2007)	"I'd Wait for Life" (2007)	"Reach Out" (2007)

Music video
- "I'd Wait for Life" on YouTube

"I'd Wait for Life" was the third single released from Take That's album Beautiful World.

== Background ==
The song was written by Take That. Featuring Gary Barlow on lead vocals, the single was released internationally on 18 June 2007 as a download and CD single. Take That performed the song live on T4's Popworld for promotion on 5 May 2007.

It was their first single to miss the top ten since 1992's "I Found Heaven", and ended the band's streak of 6 consecutive number ones.

== Critical reception ==
The song generally received mixed reviews. Digital Spy praised Barlow's vocals and songwriting on the track, but commented that there wasn't enough to make the song stand out.

== Chart performance ==
One week before the official release, the single charted at 109 on the UK Singles Chart, but jumped to number 17 after the single's official release. It slipped out of the Top 40 the following week.

== Music video ==
The music video was directed by Sean de Sparengo and premiered on Channel 4 (UK) at 11:05 pm on Wednesday 16 May 2007. The video focuses on each member of the band sinking deep beneath water, symbolising the 10 years they each spent individually away from the media spotlight. There are clips of happy memories shown throughout the video such as parenthood and falling in love as well as unhappier times such as relationships falling apart and violence, which are used to represent the struggle they all faced after the band split. The video ends with Gary Barlow pulling Jason Orange out of the water whilst Howard Donald and Mark Owen make it to the surface and look around them reflectingly as they hang onto a raft.

== Personnel ==
- Gary Barlow – lead vocals
- Howard Donald – backing vocals
- Jason Orange – backing vocals
- Mark Owen – backing vocals

== Track listing ==
UK CD single (1736401)

1. "I'd Wait for Life" (radio edit) – 4:11
2. "We All Fall Down" – 3:51

Dutch CD single

1. "I'd Wait for Life" (radio edit) – 4:11
2. "We All Fall Down" – 3:51
3. "Shine" (BBC Radio 2 'Live & Exclusive') – 3:36
4. "Back for Good" (BBC Radio 2 'Live & Exclusive') – 4:11

== Charts ==
Chart (2007)	Peak position
Europe (Eurochart Hot 100)	40
Ireland (IRMA)	32
Italy (FIMI)	13
Italy (Musica e dischi)	39
Netherlands (Dutch Top 40 Tipparade)	14
Scottish Singles Sales (Official Charts)	6
Slovakia (IFPI)	74
UK Singles (OCC)	17
UK Airplay (Music Week)	29
