= Rule the World (Take That song) =

2007 single by Take That

Single by Take That

from the album Beautiful World (Tour Edition)
- B-side: "Stay Together"
- Released: 21 October 2007
- Genre: Pop rock; soft rock; post-Britpop
- Length: 3:58 (radio edit); 4:58 (album version)
- Label: Polydor
- Songwriters: Gary Barlow; Howard Donald; Jason Orange; Mark Owen
- Producer: John Shanks

Take That singles chronology
"Reach Out" (2007)	"Rule the World" (2007)	"Greatest Day" (2008)

Music video
- "Take That - Rule The World (Band Version)" on YouTube

"Rule the World" is a song by English boy band Take That. It was recorded for the soundtrack of the film Stardust (2007), (Note: The song was written specifically for the soundtrack of the 2007 film Stardust.) and included on the deluxe edition of their fourth studio album Beautiful World (2006).

It was released in the United Kingdom on 21 October 2007 via digital download and as a CD single the following day. The single peaked at number two on the UK Singles Chart and went on to become the group's best selling single, shifting over 1.8 million sales and being certified as 3× platinum by the British Phonographic Industry (BPI).

The song was submitted for consideration at the 80th Academy Awards for Best Original Song, but was not nominated. In addition to the song featuring in the film, it also played over the ending of the episode "Fireworks" of the sitcom Not Going Out.

== Background ==
"Rule the World" is the first song written by Take That specifically for a film. Matthew Vaughn, the director of Stardust, contacted Take That in the hope of getting them to write a song for the film. After seeing the film the band members agreed to write and perform a song. The band wrote the chorus of the song while they were in Spain. They played the song for Matthew Vaughn who included it in the end credits of the film. Gary Barlow performs lead vocals, with Howard Donald also singing in the chorus.

The full-length version appears exclusively on the souvenir Tour Edition of the album Beautiful World, which was released in November 2007, and on the UK version of the soundtrack album for Stardust.

It was released internationally exclusively as a single on 21 October 2007, and was premiered live by the band at the inaugural National Movie Awards on 28 September 2007 to rave reviews and critical acclaim. It ended 2007 as the year's 5th biggest-selling single in the UK, despite being released just two months from the end of the year. The song was also the 44th best selling single in the UK of 2008, the following year, and the 16th best selling single in Ireland in 2007.

Crossover singer Camilla Kerslake, a protégée of Gary Barlow, recorded the song on her eponymous debut album as "Il Mondo è Nostro" ("The World Is Ours").

== Chart performance ==
In October 2007, "Rule the World" entered the UK Singles Chart at number 46 and peaked at number 2, being held off the top spot by Leona Lewis' "Bleeding Love". The song became the 5th biggest-selling single of 2007 and remained in the top 100 until 12 April 2009, 1 year, 5 months and 21 days after the single's release. On 21 September 2008, the song managed to climb back up to number 34 on the UK Singles Chart following a performance by contestants on BBC One's Last Choir Standing and on 30 November 2008 it managed to climb up the chart once again to number 27 following its appearance on The X Factor, sung by Rachel Hylton.

The song spent twelve weeks inside the UK top ten, the longest of any Take That song. It re-entered the chart again in November 2009 following another X Factor performance, this time by Stacey Solomon, and again in November 2010, and has spent 75 weeks on the official UK top 75 chart, making it the 5th longest runner of all time, and 100 weeks on the top 100. It was the 30th biggest-selling single of the 2000s in the UK. As of January 2024, it has sold 1.8 million copies in the UK, making it the group's best-selling single in the country.

== Critical reception ==
Digital Spy praised the song, stating it is "a big, proper, important-sounding ballad – the piano chords tremor with passion, the strings sweep impressively and every strum of the guitar seems to quiver with emotion – it offers copious proof that Gary Barlow's flair for melody is still very much intact."

== Music video ==
The music video was directed by Barney Clay and filmed at Abbey Road Studios. It shows the band and the orchestra at the studios performing the song. Another version of the video features excerpts from the movie Stardust. It premiered on ITV on 22 September 2007. An animated lyric video was uploaded on YouTube on 24 May 2022 and it displays the lyrics following a shooting star across various illustrated landmarks around the world including The Eiffel Tower, Taj Mahal, Mount Rushmore, The Statue of Liberty, Big Ben and The Northern Lights.

== Live performances ==
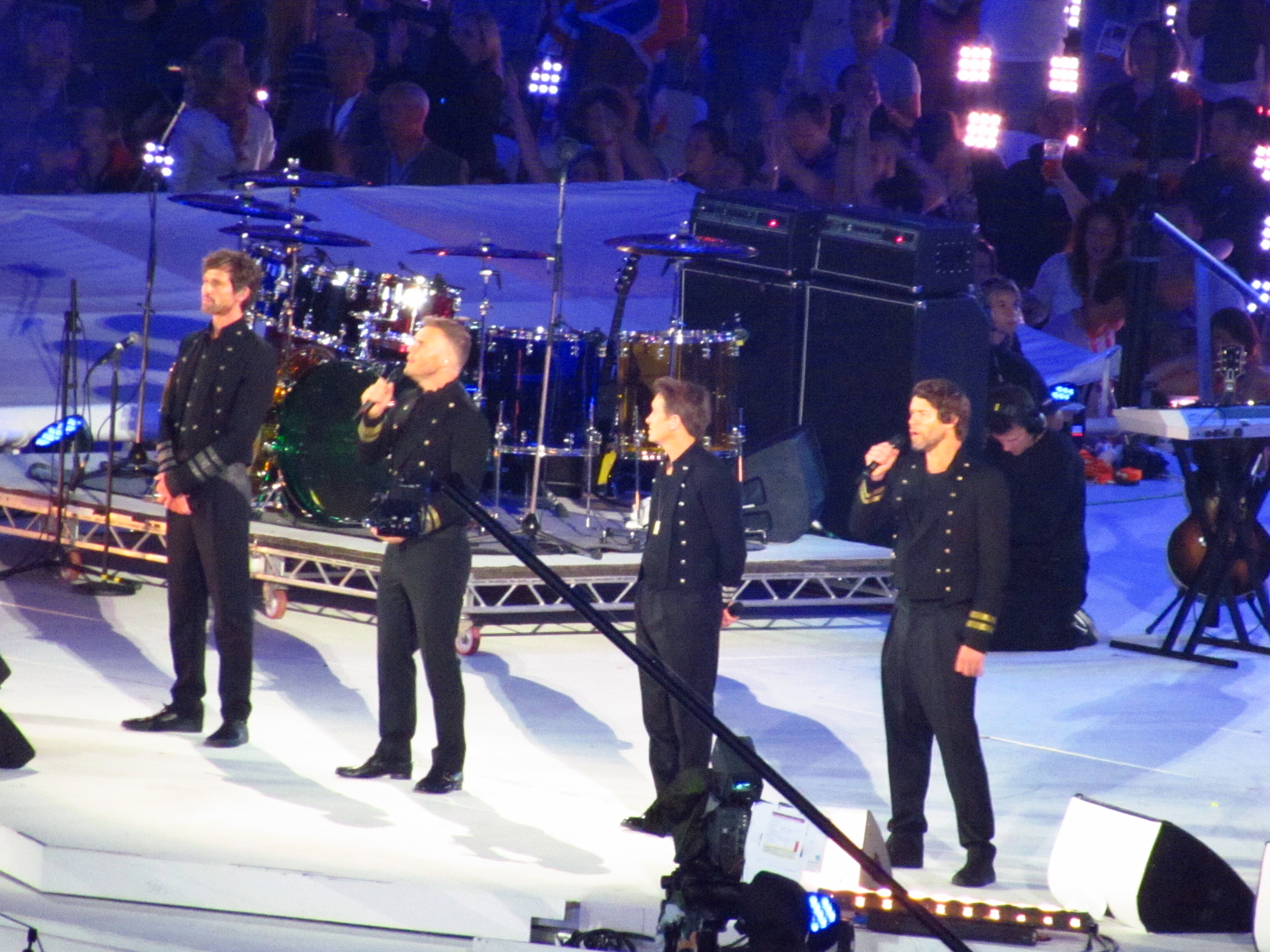
Take That performing "Rule the World" at the 2012 Olympic Games closing ceremony in London

The song was the finale to The Circus Live Tour in 2009, the Wonderland Live Tour in 2017, the Greatest Hits Live Tour in 2019, the This Life on Tour Tour in 2024 and The Circus Live Tour again in 2026 and the opening to the Progress Live Tour in 2011. The song was also performed on 19 November 2009 for Children in Need on "Children in Need Rocks the Royal Albert Hall", where Gary Barlow dedicated it to his father, who had died 5 weeks earlier.

Take That performed the song at the London 2012 Olympic Games Closing Ceremony whilst the Olympic Flame was extinguished. The band's performance of the song during the closing ceremony was lauded as inspiring, in light of the loss of Barlow's stillborn daughter Poppy a week before.

The group performed the song during the finale of the F1 75 Live global telecast held at the O2 Arena in London on 18 February 2025.

== Personnel ==
Take That

- Gary Barlow – lead vocals, acoustic piano
- Howard Donald – backing vocals
- Jason Orange – backing vocals
- Mark Owen – backing vocals

Additional personnel

- John Shanks – keyboards, guitar, bass
- Jeff Rothschild – drums
- The Millennium Ensemble – strings

== Track listing ==
UK CD single

1. "Rule the World" (radio edit) – 3:58
2. "Stay Together" – 3:57

German CD single

1. "Rule the World" (radio edit) – 3:58
2. "Stay Together" – 3:57
3. "Rule the World" (video) – 4:00

== Charts ==
=== Weekly charts ===
Chart (2007)	Peak position
Austria (Ö3 Austria Top 40)	50
Belgium (Ultratip Bubbling Under Flanders)	13
CIS Airplay (TopHit)	56
Croatia (HRT)	6
Czech Republic Airplay (ČNS IFPI)	74
Denmark (Tracklisten)	32
Denmark Airplay (Tracklisten)	11
Europe (Eurochart Hot 100)	5
Europe (Euro Digital Song Sales)	4
Germany (GfK)	15
Ireland (IRMA)	3
Italy (FIMI)	6
Italy (Musica e dischi)	7
Latvia (Latvijas Top 50)	41
Netherlands (Single Top 100)	57
Portugal (AFP)	44
Romania (Romanian Top 100)	66
Russia (TopHit)	99
Scottish Singles Sales (Official Charts)	2
Slovakia Airplay (ČNS IFPI)	26
Switzerland (Schweizer Hitparade)	25
Switzerland Airplay (Swiss Hitparade)	21
UK Singles (Official Charts)	2
UK Airplay (Music Week)	1

Chart (2012)	Peak position
UK Singles (OCC)	52
UK Singles Downloads (Official Charts)	53

Chart (2023)	Peak position
UK Singles Sales (OCC)	89

=== Year-end charts ===
Chart (2007)	Position
Europe (Billboard)	85
Ireland (IRMA)	16
Italy (Musica e dischi)	57
UK Singles (OCC)	5
UK Airplay (Music Week)	18

Chart (2008)	Position
Europe (Billboard)	44
UK Singles (OCC)	44
UK Airplay (Music Week)	12

Chart (2009)	Position
UK Singles (OCC)	123
UK Airplay (Music Week)	52

=== Decade-end charts ===
Chart (2000–2009)	Position
UK Singles (OCC)	30

== Certifications ==
Region	Certification	Certified units/sales
United Kingdom (BPI)	3× Platinum	1,800,000^{‡}
^{‡} Sales+streaming figures based on certification alone.
