= Beautiful World (Take That album) =

Studio album by Take That
- Released: 24 November 2006
- Recorded: 2006
- Studios: RAK, London; Abbey Road, London; AIR, London; Henson, Hollywood
- Genre: Pop rock
- Length: 47:46
- Label: Polydor
- Producer: John Shanks

Take That chronology
Never Forget – The Ultimate Collection (2005)	Beautiful World (2006)	The Circus (2008)

Singles from Beautiful World
- 1. "Patience" Released: 13 November 2006; 2. "Shine" Released: 26 February 2007; 3. "I'd Wait for Life" Released: 18 June 2007; 4. "Reach Out" Released: 22 June 2007; 5. "Rule the World" Released: 21 October 2007

Beautiful World is the fourth studio album by the English pop group Take That. Released on 27 November 2006, it was the band's first studio album in 11 years; it was also the band's first album to be released as a four-piece instead of the original five-piece, without Robbie Williams, who had quit the group in 1995 and was not to rejoin them until 2010. Five singles were released from the album: "Patience", "Shine", "I'd Wait for Life", the European-only single "Reach Out", and "Rule the World", which appeared on the deluxe tour edition. The album features what Take That describe as "a throwback to the 90s, but with a modern twist". Beautiful World is their first album in which every member of the band sings lead vocals on at least one song, as well as contributing to the songwriting and production.

In 2011, Beautiful World was ranked at number 240 in Q's readers poll of the "250 Best Albums of the Last 25 Years".

== Background ==
During work on the Ultimate Tour, the group contemplated making another Take That album. It was agreed that everyone would contribute to the songwriting process, thus sharing in the production and the royalties. John Shanks was brought in to serve as a producer for the album.

The title "Beautiful World" was chosen by band member Howard Donald. In an interview, Mark Owen revealed the original idea was to call the album "Shine" after the song of the same name. Another alternate title "Patience" was considered, but Gary Barlow demurred on the grounds of a previously released album by George Michael.

== Singles ==
- "Patience" was released on 13 November 2006 as the first single from the album. The single peaked at the top of the UK Singles Chart, and also topped the charts in Germany, Spain and Switzerland, as well as peaking with the top ten of the charts in Denmark, Ireland, Italy, Austria and Sweden. The song also won the Best British Single Award at the 2007 BRIT Awards and was voted The Record of the Year for 2006, polling 15.5% of the final vote.
- "Shine" was released on 26 February 2007 as the second single from the album. The single peaked at #1 on the UK Singles Chart, and also peaked within the top ten in many other countries.
- "I'd Wait for Life" was released in the United Kingdom on 18 June 2007. The song became the band's first single to miss the top ten since 1992's "I Found Heaven", and ended the band's streak of six consecutive number ones. One week before the official release, the single charted at 109 on the UK Singles Chart, but jumped to number 17 after the single's official release. It slipped out of the Top 40 the second week. It is rarely played during the band's live shows.
- "Reach Out" was released as the album's fourth single on 22 June 2007. The track was released exclusively in Europe, as an alternative to the British-only single "I'd Wait for Life". It performed well across Europe, peaking inside the top twenty in the Danish charts and narrowly missing the top ten in the Italian charts, peaking at #11. No official music video was produced for the release, although, the Italian division of Universal Music ran a competition for people to produce a music video based on the song, and the winning entry, directed by Alisha Antylla, was aired once on Total Request Live on MTV Italy.
- "Rule the World" was released on 21 October 2007 as the fifth and final single from the album, appearing on the Deluxe tour edition as one of three bonus tracks. The song was recorded for the soundtrack of the 2007 film Stardust. The single peaked at #2 on the UK Singles Chart, being held off the top spot by Leona Lewis' "Bleeding Love", it became the fifth best selling single of 2007.

== Critical reception ==
Professional ratings
Review scores
Source	Rating
AllMusic	4/5 stars
BBC Music	positive
Digital Spy	5/5 stars
Entertainment.ie	3/5 stars
The Guardian	3/5 stars
The Observer	3/5 stars

Two weeks before the official UK release of Beautiful World, iTunes UK made the album available for pre-order. It immediately shot up the online music store's Top Albums list, peaking at number 1 on the day of the release. In December 2006, Take That became the only act to secure a #1 position in the download chart, UK albums chart, singles chart, airplay chart and the video chart. The album received overwhelming positive reception from across the media, all praising the new musical direction that Take That had taken.

- InTheNews.co.uk

The album doesn't try for anything too dramatic and oozes with their obvious joy and gratitude at being back at the top of their game. Hearing Gary's voice on the majority of the tracks is a comforting reminder of times past, but having the other three as lead singers provides a refreshing change, with Jason Orange's Wooden Boat standing out particularly.

- MusicRemedy.com

The songs are varied and more reflective than their previous work evoking the struggles to stick together and time passing. Their amazing comeback single 'Patience' jostles for prominence amongst a string of epic opening tracks including 'Reach Out' and 'Hold On' (Mark on lead vocal). Then there are the beautiful ballads 'Like I've Never Loved You At All', stand out track 'I'd Wait For Life' and the pensive 'What You Believe In'. The album gets its really interesting twist with the Beatles-esque 'Shine' and the folk-tinged 'Wooden Boat', with Jason taking his first lead vocal.

=== Accolades ===
The lead single from the album, "Patience", won 'Best British Single' at the 2007 BRIT Awards and the second single "Shine" won 'Best British Single' at the 2008 BRIT Awards a year later.

== Commercial performance ==
The album was number one in Ireland and the UK and was very well received critically. To date the album has sold over 3.5 million copies worldwide (including 2,850,000 in the UK alone, as of July 2016). The album was the 2nd best selling of 2006 in the UK, after only being on sale for one month. The album was also the 4th best selling album of 2007, and 33rd best selling of 2008.

The album has spent a total of 132 weeks (2 years and seven months) in the UK top 100. The album has been certified 9× Platinum in the UK, and as of 2014 is the 32nd best selling album in British music history.

== Track listing ==
All tracks are written by Gary Barlow, Mark Owen, Howard Donald and Jason Orange, and produced by John Shanks, additional songwriters are noted below.

Standard edition
No.	Title	Writer(s)	Lead vocals	Length
1.	"Reach Out"	John Shanks	Barlow	4:16
2.	"Patience"	Shanks	Barlow	3:20
3.	"Beautiful World"	Steve Robson	Donald	4:25
4.	"Hold On"	Shanks	Owen	3:56
5.	"Like I Never Loved You at All"	Shanks	Barlow	3:44
6.	"Shine"	Robson	Owen	3:31
7.	"I'd Wait for Life"		Barlow	4:34
8.	"Ain't No Sense in Love"	Billy Mann	Barlow	3:51
9.	"What You Believe In"	Anders Bagge	Owen	4:32
10.	"Mancunian Way"	Eg White	Donald	3:48
11.	"Wooden Boat"	Mann	Orange	3:07

International bonus track
No.	Title	Writer(s)	Lead vocals	Length
12.	"Butterfly" (hidden track)	Shanks	Barlow	3:42

Japanese bonus tracks
No.	Title	Writer(s)	Lead vocals	Length
12.	"Butterfly"	Shanks	Barlow	3:42
13.	"6 in The Morning Fool"	Mann	Barlow	3:36

Tour Edition bonus tracks
No.	Title	Writer(s)	Lead vocals	Length
12.	"Butterfly"	Shanks	Barlow	3:42
13.	"Beautiful Morning" ("Patience" B-side)	Shanks; Ben Mark	Barlow	3:37
14.	"We All Fall Down"	Robson	Owen	3:47
15.	"Rule the World"		Barlow	4:58

Tour Edition bonus DVD (videos)
No.	Title	Director	Length
16.	"Patience"	David Mould	3:22
17.	"Shine"	Justin Dickel	3:31
18.	"I'd Wait for Life"	Sean de Sparengo	4:33
19.	"Rule the World"	Barney Clay	4:58
20.	"The Making of Beautiful World"	Sean de Sparengo	30:00

B-sides
No.	Title	Writer(s)	Lead vocals	Length
21.	"Trouble with Me" ("Shine”/“Patience" B-side)	Shanks	Barlow	3:22
22.	"We Love to Entertain You" ("Shine" B-side)	Shanks	Barlow	3:14
23.	"We All Fall Down" (acoustic) ("I'd Wait for Life"/"Reach Out" B-side)	Robson	Owen	3:50
24.	"Stay Together" ("Rule the World" B-side)	Shanks	Owen	4:00

== Personnel ==
=== Take That ===
- Gary Barlow – vocals, acoustic piano
- Howard Donald – vocals
- Jason Orange – vocals
- Mark Owen – vocals

=== Musicians ===
- John Shanks – keyboards, guitars, bass
- Jake Davies – additional keyboards (3)
- Jamie Muhoberac – additional keyboards (3, 8, 13 "Beautiful Morning")
- Steve Robson – acoustic piano (23)
- Luke Potashnick – guitars (23)
- Jeff Rothschild – drums
- Karl Brazil – percussion (23)
- L. Shankar – electric violin (11)
- Wil Malone – string arrangements (2, 4–11)
- Gavyn Wright – orchestra leader (2, 4–11)
- London Session Orchestra – orchestra (2, 4–11)
- The Millennia Ensemble – strings (15)
- Phil Shepherd – strings (23)
- Matthew Ward – strings (23)
- Grace Donald (Howard's daughter) – additional vocals (10)

=== Production ===
- John Shanks – producer
- Steve Robson – producer (23)
- Jeff Rothschild – recording, mixing
- Richard Flack – recording (23), mixing (23)
- Robin Baynton, Chris Bolster, Andrew Dudman, Mike Horner, Jake Jackson, Lewis Jones and Sam Jones – assistant engineers
- Lars Fox – Pro Tools editing
- Ted Jensen – mastering at Sterling Sound (New York City, New York, USA)
- Shari Sutcliffe – production coordinator
- Studio Fury – art direction, design
- Tom Craig – photography
- Jonathan Wild and 10 Management – management

== Charts ==
=== Weekly charts ===
Chart (2006–2007)	Peak position
Argentine Albums (CAPIF)	10
Australian Albums (ARIA)	32
Austrian Albums (Ö3 Austria)	8
Belgian Albums (Ultratop Flanders)	62
Danish Albums (Hitlisten)	2
Dutch Albums (Album Top 100)	33
European Albums Chart	3
German Albums (Offizielle Top 100)	2
Greek Albums (IFPI Greece)	25
Irish Albums (IRMA)	1
Italian Albums (FIMI)	25
Italian Albums (Musica e Dischi)	27
Japanese Albums (Oricon)	40
Norwegian Albums (VG-lista)	34
Scottish Albums (OCC)	1
Spanish Albums (Promusicae)	16
Swedish Albums (Sverigetopplistan)	40
Swiss Albums (Schweizer Hitparade)	6
Taiwanese Albums (G-Music)	1
UK Albums (Official Charts)	1

=== Year-end charts ===
Chart (2006)	Position
UK Albums (OCC)	2
Chart (2007)	Position
European Albums (Billboard)	10
German Albums (Offizielle Top 100)	54
Irish Albums (IRMA)	8
Italian Albums (FIMI)	95
Swiss Albums (Schweizer Hitparade)	88
UK Albums (OCC)	4
Chart (2008)	Position
European Albums (Billboard)	51
UK Albums (OCC)	33
Chart (2009)	Position
UK Albums (OCC)	93

=== Decade-end charts ===
Chart (2000–2009)	Position
UK Albums Chart	11

== Certifications ==
Region	Certification	Certified units/sales
Denmark (IFPI Danmark)	Platinum	40,000^{^}
Germany (BVMI)	Platinum	200,000^{^}
Ireland (IRMA)	2× Platinum	30,000^{^}
Italy (FIMI)	Gold	40,000^{*}
Switzerland (IFPI Switzerland)	Gold	15,000^{^}
United Kingdom (BPI)	9× Platinum	2,850,000
Summaries
Europe (IFPI)	3× Platinum	3,000,000^{*}
^{*} Sales figures based on certification alone.^{^} Shipments figures based on certification alone.

== Release history ==
Country	Date	Label	Format	Catalogue #
United Kingdom	27 November 2006	Polydor	CD	1715551
Taiwan	27 November 2006	Universal International	CD	U171651-0
China	27 November 2006	Universal International	CD	TY0191C
Japan	27 November 2006	Universal International	CD	UICP-1078
United States	4 December 2006	Universal	CD	–
United Kingdom	12 November 2007	Polydor	CD + DVD	1747133

== See also ==
- List of best-selling albums of the 2000s (decade) in the United Kingdom
