= Brit Awards 2008 =

British music awards ceremony

- Date: 20 February 2008
- Venue: Earls Court
- Hosted by: Ozzy, Sharon, Kelly and Jack Osbourne

Highlights
- Most awards: Arctic Monkeys, Foo Fighters and Take That (2)
- Most nominations: Mika, Leona Lewis, and Take That (4)

Television/radio coverage
- Network: ITV

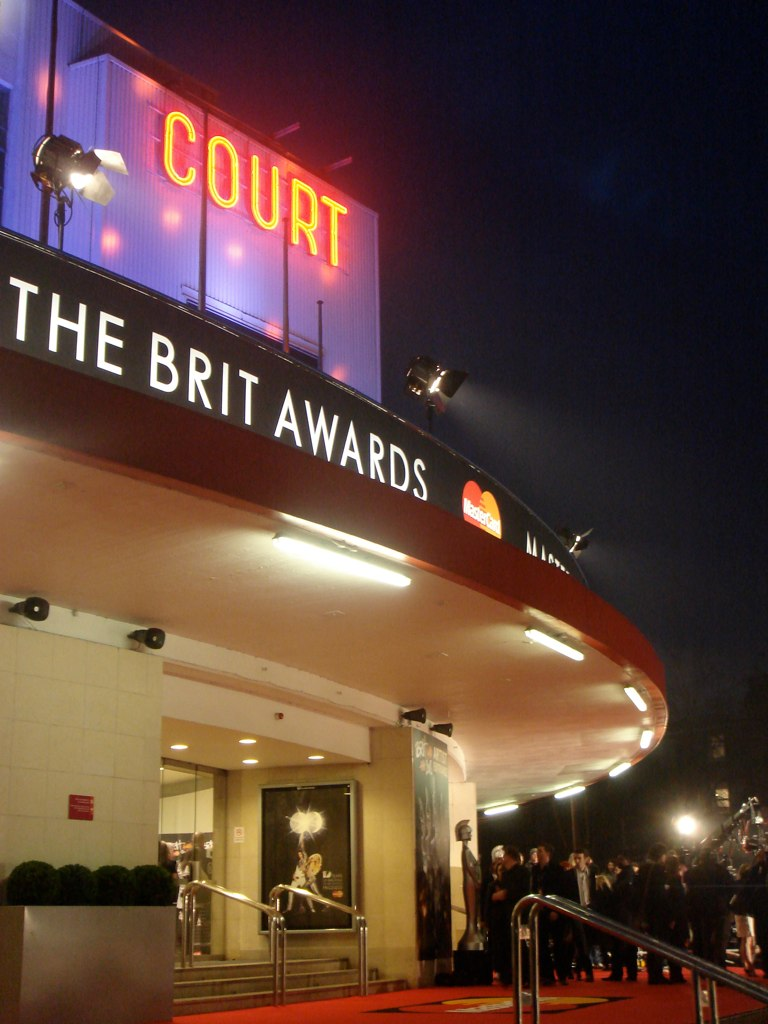
The entrance to Earls Court in London on the evening of the 2008 ceremony

Brit Awards 2008 was the 28th edition of the Brit Awards, an annual music awards ceremony in the United Kingdom. It was organised by the British Phonographic Industry and took place on 20 February 2008 at the Earls Court in London.

Leona Lewis was nominated for four awards but came away empty-handed. The ceremony attracted 6.1 million viewers, 800,000 more than the previous live broadcast.

== Performances ==
Artist	Song	UK Singles Chart reaction (week ending 1 March 2008)	UK Albums Chart reaction (week ending 1 March 2008)
Mika; Beth Ditto	"Love Today" "Standing in the Way of Control" "Grace Kelly"	N/A; 88 (re-entry); 57 (+35)	Life in Cartoon Motion – 5 (+4)
Rihanna; Klaxons	"Umbrella"	44 (+3)	Rihanna; Good Girl Gone Bad – 10 (+1) Klaxons; Myths of the Near Future – 79 (re-entry)
Kylie Minogue	"Wow"	5 (+13)	X – 24 (+14)
Kaiser Chiefs	"Ruby"	79 (re-entry)	Yours Truly, Angry Mob – 49 (+4); Employment – 93 (re-entry)
Leona Lewis	"Bleeding Love"	33 (+4)	Spirit – 23 (+7)
Mark Ronson; Adele; Daniel Merriweather; Amy Winehouse	"God Put a Smile upon Your Face" "Stop Me" "Valerie"	N/A; 51 (re-entry); 13 (+9)	Mark Ronson; Version – 4 (+18) Adele; 19 – 7 (-3)
Amy Winehouse	"Love Is a Losing Game"	N/A	Back to Black - The Deluxe Edition – 3 (+11); Back to Black – 12 (+4); Frank – 27 (+5)
Sir Paul McCartney	"Dance Tonight" "Live and Let Die" "Hey Jude" "Lady Madonna" "Get Back"	N/A	N/A

== Winners and Nominees ==
British Album of the Year (presented by Vic Reeves)	British Single of the Year (presented by Alan Carr)
Arctic Monkeys – Favourite Worst Nightmare; Leona Lewis – Spirit; Mark Ronson – Version; Mika – Life in Cartoon Motion; Take That – Beautiful World	Take That – "Shine"; Leona Lewis – "Bleeding Love"; Mika – "Grace Kelly"; Mark Ronson (featuring Amy Winehouse) – "Valerie"; The Hoosiers – "Worried About Ray"; Kaiser Chiefs – "Ruby" eliminated on 18 February; Sugababes – "About You Now" eliminated on 18 February; Kate Nash – "Foundations" eliminated on 17 February; James Blunt – "1973" eliminated on 16 February; Mutya Buena – "Real Girl" eliminated on 15 February
British Male Solo Artist (presented by Beth Ditto)	British Female Solo Artist (presented by James Nesbitt)
Mark Ronson; Jamie T; Mika; Newton Faulkner; Richard Hawley	Kate Nash; Bat for Lashes; KT Tunstall; Leona Lewis; PJ Harvey
British Group (presented by Ian McKellen)	British Breakthrough Act (presented by Jonathan Rhys Myers)
Arctic Monkeys; Editors; Girls Aloud; Kaiser Chiefs; Take That	Mika; Bat for Lashes; Kate Nash; Klaxons; Leona Lewis
British Live Act (presented by Chris Moyles)	Critics' Choice Award (presented by Will Young)
Take That; Arctic Monkeys; Kaiser Chiefs; Klaxons; Muse	Adele; Duffy; Foals
International Male Solo Artist (presented by Kelly Rowland)	International Female Solo Artist (presented by David Tennant)
Kanye West; Bruce Springsteen; Michael Bublé; Rufus Wainwright; Timbaland	Kylie Minogue; Alicia Keys; Björk; Feist; Rihanna
International Group (presented by Denise van Outen and Andrew Lloyd Webber)	International Album (presented by Michelle Ryan)
Foo Fighters; Arcade Fire; Eagles; Kings of Leon; The White Stripes	Foo Fighters – Echoes, Silence, Patience & Grace; Arcade Fire – Neon Bible; Eagles – Long Road Out of Eden; Kings of Leon – Because of the Times; Kylie Minogue – X

=== Outstanding Contribution to Music ===
- Paul McCartney (presented by Kylie Minogue)

== Multiple nominations and Awards ==
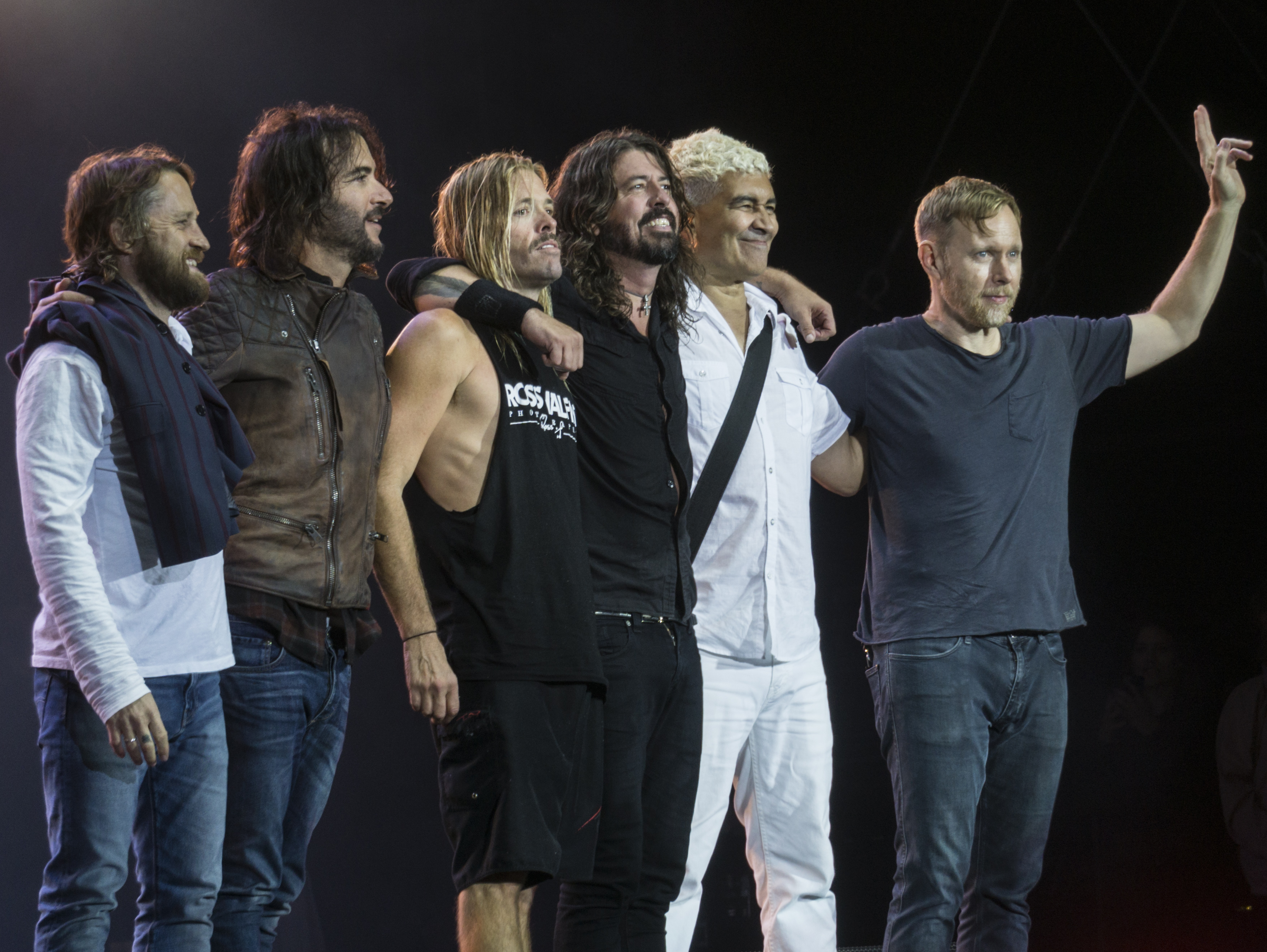
Two-time winner Foo Fighters

Artists that received multiple nominations
Nominations	Artist
4 (2)	Mika
4 (2)	Take That
3 (5)	Arctic Monkeys
3 (5)	Kaiser Chiefs
3 (5)	Kate Nash
3 (5)	Leona Lewis
3 (5)	Mark Ronson
2 (7)	Arcade Fire
2 (7)	Bat for Lashes
2 (7)	Eagles
2 (7)	Foo Fighters
2 (7)	Kings of Leon
2 (7)	Klaxons
2 (7)	Kylie Minogue

Artists that received multiple awards
Awards	Artist
2 (3)	Arctic Monkeys
2 (3)	Foo Fighters
2 (3)	Take That

== Memorable moments ==
=== Vic Reeves and Sharon Osbourne ===
After Vic Reeves appeared to forget which award he was presenting, Sharon Osbourne attempted to wrestle the microphone from him, insisted he was drunk and called him a "pissed bastard". She proceeded to make the full announcement herself. The next day it was reported that Reeves was not intoxicated and was hurt by Osbourne's behaviour. The incident has since been ascribed to an autocue malfunction, but Reeves said in his defence that he was trying to read the autocue screen, but he couldn't read it because Osbourne was pushing him out of the way.

=== Arctic Monkeys ===
When the Arctic Monkeys took to the stage to collect their award for 'Best British Album', the band were dressed up in traditional English country and hunting outfits and even took a plastic duck to the stage with them. During the acceptance speech, they made a derogatory joke about the Brits School which forced producers to pull it from the television broadcast.
