= Take That Presents: The Circus Live =

2009 concert tour by Take That

Take That Present: The Circus Live
- Tour by Take That
- Location: Ireland; United Kingdom
- Associated album: The Circus
- Start date: 5 June 2009
- End date: 5 July 2009
- Legs: 1
- No. of shows: 20 (total)
- Supporting acts: Gary Go; James Morrison; The Saturdays; The Script; Lady Gaga
- Box office: US$67.8 million ($101.75 in 2025 dollars)

Take That concert chronology
- Beautiful World Tour 2007 (2007); Take That Present: The Circus Live (2009); Progress Live (2011)

Take That Present: The Circus Live was the seventh concert tour by the English pop group, Take That. The tour promoted their fifth studio album, The Circus. The tour began on 5 June 2009 at the Stadium of Light in Sunderland and finished on 5 July 2009 at Wembley Stadium in London. The Circus Live was their biggest tour to date. and was seen by 1,014,000 people, making a profit of £40,560,000. The tour became the fastest selling in UK history, with the 600,000 for all original eight dates selling out in five hours.

== Opening acts ==
- Gary Go (All)
- James Morrison (5, 9, 16, 17, 20, 26 June, 1 July)
- The Saturdays (6, 8, 19 June)
- The Script (9, 10, 13, 21, 23, 28 June, 3 July)
- Lady Gaga (4, 5 July)

== Tour dates ==
Date	City	Country	Venue
5 June 2009	Sunderland	England	Stadium of Light
6 June 2009	Sunderland	England	Stadium of Light
8 June 2009	Coventry	England	Coventry Building Society Arena
9 June 2009	Coventry	England	Coventry Building Society Arena
10 June 2009	Coventry	England	Coventry Building Society Arena
13 June 2009	Dublin	Ireland	Croke Park
16 June 2009	Cardiff	Wales	Principality Stadium
17 June 2009	Cardiff	Wales	Principality Stadium
19 June 2009	Glasgow	Scotland	Hampden Park
20 June 2009	Glasgow	Scotland	Hampden Park
21 June 2009	Glasgow	Scotland	Hampden Park
23 June 2009	Manchester	England	Old Trafford Cricket Ground
24 June 2009	Manchester	England	Old Trafford Cricket Ground
26 June 2009	Manchester	England	Old Trafford Cricket Ground
27 June 2009	Manchester	England	Old Trafford Cricket Ground
28 June 2009	Manchester	England	Old Trafford Cricket Ground
1 July 2009	London	England	Wembley Stadium
3 July 2009	London	England	Wembley Stadium
4 July 2009	London	England	Wembley Stadium
5 July 2009	London	England	Wembley Stadium

== DVD release ==
The Wembley Stadium concerts of 3 and 4 July 2009 were filmed and released as a two-disc DVD and Blu-ray set, released on 23 November 2009. A live album, containing several live recordings, and a bonus disc of Take That at Abbey Road, was released a week later. Highlights were broadcast on ITV1 on 19 December 2009. The DVD became the fastest selling DVD of all time in the UK, selling 82,414 copies in 24 hours, and 181,979 in its first week. It sold over 600,000 copies in September 2011 and has been certified 11× Platinum, becoming one of the best selling music DVDs ever in the UK.

=== Charts ===
DVDs chart (2009)	Peak position
Irish Top 10 Music DVDs	1
UK Music Videos (OCC)	1

=== Certifications ===
Region	Certification	Certified units/sales
United Kingdom (BPI)	11× Platinum	550,000^{*}
^{*} Sales figures based on certification alone.
