= Reach Out (Take That song) =

Single by Take That

from the album Beautiful World
- B-side: "We All Fall Down" (Acoustic)
- Released: 22 June 2007
- Length: 4:16
- Label: Polydor
- Songwriters: Take That; John Shanks
- Producer: John Shanks

Take That singles chronology
"I'd Wait for Life" (2007)	"Reach Out" (2007)	"Rule the World" (2007)

Audio video
- "Reach Out" on YouTube

"Reach Out" is a song from Take That's fourth album, Beautiful World, released as the album's fourth single on 22 June 2007. Reach Out was released exclusively in Europe, as an alternative to the British-only single "I'd Wait for Life".

== Background ==
It performed well across Europe, peaking inside the top twenty in the Danish charts and narrowly missing the top ten in the Italian charts, peaking at number 11. No official music video was produced for the release, although, the Italian division of Universal Music ran a competition for people to produce a music video based on the song, and the winning entry, directed by Alisha Antylla, was aired once on Total Request Live on MTV Italy.

== Critical reception ==
Alexis Petridis from The Guardian described the song as a "dazzingly effective pop song." AllMusic mentioned that the uptempo track showed the group "were obviously enjoying every minute of the comeback".

== Personnel ==
- Gary Barlow – lead vocals
- Howard Donald – backing vocals
- Jason Orange – backing vocals
- Mark Owen – backing vocals

== Track listing ==
- CD single
1. "Reach Out" – 4:16
2. "We All Fall Down" (acoustic) – 3:51
- Limited edition CD single
1. "Reach Out" – 4:16
2. "We All Fall Down" (acoustic) – 3:51
3. "Shine" (BBC Radio 2 'Live & Exclusive') – 3:36
4. "Back for Good" (BBC Radio 2 'Live & Exclusive') – 4:11

== Charts ==
Chart (2007)	Peak position
Austria (Ö3 Austria Top 40)	64
Denmark (Tracklisten)	13
Europe (Hot 100)	99
Germany (GfK)	44
Italy (FIMI)	11
Italy (Musica e dischi)	17
Switzerland Airplay (Swiss Hitparade)	12
