= Never Forget (musical) =

Jukebox musical

- The 'Take That' Musical
- Never Forget poster, 2008
- Music: Gary Barlow
- Lyrics: Gary Barlow
- Book: Guy Jones; Ed Curtis; Danny Brocklehurst
- Basis: Take That discography
- Productions: 2007 UK National Tour; 2008 West End; 2009 UK National Tour

Never Forget is a jukebox musical with a book written by Guy Jones and Ed Curtis, with screenwriter Danny Brocklehurst acting as story advisor, based on the 1990s songs of boy band Take That, written by Gary Barlow. In addition to Barlow's songs, Never Forget features additional music and lyrics by Barry Manilow, Dan Hartman and Adrienne Anderson, all of which were covered by Take That in the 1990s. The musical's story focuses on the themes of friendship, ambition, love and betrayal among the members of a Take That tribute band, but it is not related to the history of Take That. The musical is named after Take That's chart-topping single "Never Forget".

The musical Never Forget premiered at the Wales Millennium Centre, Cardiff, in July 2007 prior to a short UK tour. The show was nominated for the 2008 WOS Theatregoers Choice Award for Best Touring Production and received generally favourable notices. It then re-opened at The Churchill Theatre, Bromley, London, in March 2008 for a second six-city pre-West End tour.

The musical began previews on 7 May 2008 at the Savoy Theatre in London and officially opened on 21 May 2008 to generally favourable reviews. The tours and West End production were both directed by Ed Curtis and choreographed by Karen Bruce. The set design was by Bob Bailey, lighting design by James Whiteside, sound design by Richard Brooker and costume design by Christopher Woods. The production closed at the Savoy on 15 November 2008.

The original touring production is available on DVD, filmed on the press night at Manchester Opera House.

== Synopsis ==
The plot of Never Forget has been through several incarnations since the initial workshop production which toured the UK in 2007. Each version of the script is deliberately different in order to update the setting of the show. When the original production played, Take That had just reformed and the show referenced this. In more recent productions, the characters have noted the success the boyband have seen since their comeback.

=== Act 1 ===
Ash Sherwood is a struggling singer-songwriter in Manchester, England, with dreams of making it big. He proposes to his girlfriend Chloe and, to his surprise, she accepts ("Could It Be Magic"), and the couple's engagement party follows. Ash's mum's pub, 'The Three Bells' is under threat due to mounting debt, and Ash needs to raise money quickly. Taking a desperate chance, Ash and his best friend, Jake Turner (Chloe's older brother), decide to audition for a tribute band set to be entered into the lucrative 'Battle of the Tribute Bands' competition. Holding the auditions is Ron Freeman, an eccentric but hard-nosed band manager. With money problems of his own, Ron is looking for a group of lads he can mould into the ultimate Take That tribute band.

At the audition ("Pray"), the band come together as Ash and Jake are joined by three others: Adrian Banks, an introverted bank manager trying to win back his adulterous wife; Dirty Harry, a dim but endearing stripper who is desperate to escape the world of stripping; and Jose Reize, a Spaniard come to England in search of fame and fortune, and happy to escape from his overbearing mother. Once Ron chooses the band members, rehearsals begin, and the boys are joined by their new choreographer and backing dancers ("Pray" (reprise)). In her dark and empty pub, Babs Sherwood has just received her final eviction notice. She reminisces over her years spent behind the bar ("Never Forget"). Ash promises Babs that he will save the pub with his competition winnings (if they win). Chloe, immersed in wedding magazines, wants the perfect wedding. Babs tries to convince Ash that it is too late for the pub, and the money would be better spent on the wedding.

The following day at the gym, the boys are working out with their choreographer and backing dancers. Jake tries to hit on the choreographer, who is not best pleased with the bands progress in the rehearsal room; she turns on him and calls the band amateurs. The argument between the band members and choreographer turns into a 'dance off' between the boys and the backing dancers ("Take That & Party"). Ron enters the gym's changing room to discover the boys messing around, and he lectures them about dedication. He makes them sign his contract and relays the news that they are scheduled to perform a 'practice gig' the next night at a local pub in Salford.

The following evening, back stage at the pub, Ron gives the band his pre show pep talk and inspires them with stories of "World Ruddy Domination". Ron takes Ash aside to tell him that there will be somebody special watching the performance. On stage at the pub, the boys lose their confidence in front of the audience, and the other four leave Ash alone to begin the number ("Babe"). Inspired by Ash's performance, the others regain their confidence and join Ash on stage. Ron and Annie Borrowman, Ron's record-producer friend, watch the performance from the sidelines. After the performance, they take Ash aside and offer him a special contract – a solo deal. Ash tells Chloe about the offer, vowing to try to talk Annie into taking the rest of the group as well.

On Ash's Stag Night, whilst queuing outside the Salsa Bar, Ash and his friends bump into Chloe and her friends out for her Hen Night. Ash's mum forces them to combine the 2 parties inside the club ("It Only Takes a Minute"). Ron and Annie turn up for the party, and Chloe discovers that Annie is after more than just Ash's talent. Ash is unable to convince Annie to take on any of the other boys as part of her special deal. A jealous Chloe throws her drink at Annie. Outside the club, Chloe and Ash argue over Annie and the special deal. Chloe shouts "Do What You Like", leaving Ash alone to make his choice: loyalty to his friends and fiancée or his solo career.

The next day, at the Three Belles Pub, Chloe tells her brother and the rest of the group about Annie's secret offer. Ash enters and is forced to tell them that he has decided to take Annie's offer, which could lead to stardom, and to leave the boys and their tribute band behind. The rest of the band leave Chloe and Ash behind in disgust. Chloe is upset, and after another argument calls off the engagement. Ash is left alone with his thoughts and wanders in the rain ("Back for Good"). Ash and Chloe are unable to resolve their differences. The rest of the band and the crowd returns ("Never Forget" (reprise)) and the rain stops.

=== Act 2 ===
Poster – Warren Street Underground Station

The front cloth flies out to reveal the four remaining band members tap dancing to the tune of ("I Found Heaven"), but there is a space where Ash should be, as the four boys carry on without him. In a backstage dressing room, Chloe decides to join the group to fill in Ash's missing space. The four boys, happy with that resolution, decide to visit Ash to make peace. In the TV studio, Ash is busy rehearsing his own number with his new dancers under the scrutinising eye of Annie ("Every Guy"). The four boys enter, interrupting the rehearsal to speak to Ash, and Annie reluctantly gives them five minutes. During this time the boys make up, but Harry accidentally lets on that Chloe has replaced Ash in their band. Ash is struck with a sudden pang of jealousy.

After the rehearsal is finished, Annie decides to take Ash out for a quiet drink to discuss his career. The 'drink' ends in a seedy pole dancing club where Annie seduces Ash ("Once You've Tasted Love"). The next morning, Chloe appears at Ash's flat in Manchester to try to resolve their problems. Annie appears in the doorway inside half dressed. Chloe flees, distraught, and wanders off into the streets of Manchester ("Love Ain't Here Anymore").

In Ash's backstage dressing room, he is preparing to go on stage to perform his own entry in the 'Battle of the Bands' competition. His mum gives him a 'right good telling off' for the way he has treated Chloe, when Annie enters to tell Ash he should be warming up. Babs and Annie have a massive argument, during which Annie reveals that the money he was expecting for his deal actually went to Ron to Buy him out of his previous contract. Babs finally tells Ash he is too late to save the pub as it has gone. They leave Ash alone, but when Ron enters, Ash throws him to the ground in a heated rage before storming off. Ron is left alone with his own thoughts ("Never Forget").

In the band's dressing room, the four boys are preparing to go on stage to perform their number for the competition. Ash joins them and wants to make amends; he decides to break his deal with Annie and re-join his friends in their tribute band. They agree to accept him back. Chloe arrives to discover that they have let Ash back into the band without her approval, and she storms off. On The Battle of the Bands concert stage, the final act is announced. Amidst spectacular flames, the band perform ("Relight My Fire"), with Chloe reluctantly taking on the role made famous by Lulu. After the performance, the competition winners are announced, with the band a winner. Ron joins the band on stage to apologise for selling Ash off to Annie. Ash forgives him, and they all leave a happy Ron on stage with his trophy.

Outside the concert hall, Ash chases after Chloe, wanting to make things right, and they reconcile ("A Million Love Songs"). Later, at the church where wedding guests are arriving, the children's choir and priest are on the pulpit. Ash and Chloe enter and walk up the isle under a trumpet fanfare of "Never Forget". The children's choir sing as the couple are married, and after the ceremony is complete, all join in.

== Characters ==
=== The Band ===
==== Ash Sherwood ====
An aspiring singer-songwriter struggling to make it on the Manchester music scene. He's chasing the prize money that might help save his mum's struggling pub and pay for his wedding to Chloe.

- Take That member: Gary Barlow

==== Jake Turner ====
Ash's best friend and brother of Chloe, a sharp witted, wannabe ladies man he's hoping the band will get him out of his dead end job.

- Take That member: Robbie Williams

==== Adrian Banks ====
An introverted bank manager, hopelessly attempting to win over his adulterous wife.

- Take That member: Mark Owen

==== Dirty Harry ====
A dim yet endearing stripper looking to recover his self-respect.

- Take That member: Howard Donald

==== Jose Reize ====
A wide-eyed and optimistic Spaniard, who has travelled to England to make something of himself – away from the clutches of his overbearing mother.

- Take That member: Jason Orange

=== Supporting roles ===
==== Chloe Turner ====
A young teaching assistant, engaged to Ash. She is sensitive and naive, and therefore surprises all when she goes on to take on Lulu's part in Relight My Fire.

==== Ron Freeman ====
A businessman trying to form a Take That tribute band, loosely based upon Take That's former manager Nigel Martin-Smith.

==== Annie Borrowman ====
A record-production executive from the fictional MBA records. The show's main antagonist, she is manipulative, and is likened during the musical to Simon Cowell.

==== Babs Sherwood ====
Ash's mother, landlady of a Manchester pub which is having money trouble.

== Musical numbers ==
- Act 1
  - Overture:(Never Forget)
  - Could It Be Magic – Ash, Chloe and Chorus
  - Pray – Ash, Jake, Adrian, Harry and Jose
  - Never Forget – Babs (Note: With the exception of the finale, Never Forget and its reprise are sung as ballads by Babs and Ron respectively. The chorus is not sung in these versions, changing the tone and meaning of the piece. The finale is sung in the original format made famous by Take That.)
  - Take That & Party – Ash, Jake, Adrian, Harry, Jose and Backing Dancers
  - Babe – Ash, Jake, Adrian, Harry and Jose
  - It Only Takes a Minute – Chorus
  - Do What U Like – Ash and Chorus (Note: In the 2009 tour of the UK, the song Do What U Like was played only as instrumental at a scene changeover, whereas it was sung by Ash with the chorus in the original production.)
  - Back for Good/Never Forget Medley Ash, Chloe, Jake, Adrian, Harry, Jose and Chorus
- Act 2
  - I Found Heaven – Jake, Adrian, Harry, Jose and Chorus
  - Every Guy – Ash
  - Once You've Tasted Love – Annie
  - Love Ain't Here Anymore – Chloe
  - Never Forget (reprise) – Ron
  - Relight My Fire – ''Ash, Jake, Adrian, Harry, Jose and Chloe
  - A Million Love Songs – Ash and Chloe
  - Never Forget ''Ash, Chloe, Jake, Adrian, Harry, Jose, Children's Choir and Chorus
  - Never Forget Remix – Full Company

== Notable casts ==
=== West End cast ===
- Ash Sherwood – Dean Chisnall
- Jake 'The Face' Turner – Craige Els
- Jose Reize – Stephane Anelli
- Adrian Banks – Tim Driesen
- Dirty Harry – Eaton James
- Chloe Turner – Sophia Ragavelas
- Annie Borrowman – Joanne Farrell
- Ron Freeman – Teddy Kempner
- Babs Sherwood – Marilyn Cutts

=== 2009 Tour cast ===
- Ash Sherwood – Mark Willshire
- Jake 'The Face' Turner – Adam C. Booth
- Jose Reize – Scott Garnham
- Adrian Banks – Tom Bradley
- Dirty Harry – Philip Olivier
- Chloe Turner – Aimie Atkinson
- Annie Borrowman – Kay Murphy
- Ron Freeman – Teddy Kempner
- Babs Sherwood – Penelope Woodman

== Reception ==
Show poster

Reviews for the tour were mostly positive. For instance, the headline for the review in The Guardian declared, "Hell, you've got to love 'em – A million love songs and a happy ending: it's hard not to fall for Take That's own Mamma Mia!" Another Manchester critic's assessment was less enthusiastic: "For a story which could touch upon the post-Factory Manchester music scene, the rise of boy bands and the regeneration of the city after the bomb, Never Forget is surprisingly damp. Writers Guy Jones and Danny Brocklehurst have seemingly taken the money and run on this one, turning in a script which is a bland and childish tale of friendship surviving against the rigours of fame."

Reviews for the West End opening were generally favourable, bestowing particular praise on Karen Bruce's choreography and the falling rain special effect. The Daily Telegraph theatre critic Charles Spencer wrote that it was "not nearly as terrible as I secretly hoped it would be... [It was] rapturously received [and] clearly destined to do a lucrative trade". However, box office returns quickly fell off, and the production lost money.

== Controversy ==
In April 2006, EMI licensed the Take That songs to be used in Never Forget. At the time, Take That had not performed together since the 1990s. Soon thereafter, however, the band re-formed. In 2007, Take That posted the following statement on their website: "The band would like to state categorically that this production is being undertaken with neither their involvement nor their endorsement. They would wish their fans and the general public to know that this production is absolutely and 100 per cent nothing to do with Take That."

After the musical's opening in London, Gary Barlow told the BBC, "At first I thought it sounded horrible... [but] the reports I've seen have been really good so there must be something good in it. I'm just worried that they're better than us."

== Awards and nominations ==
- Best New Musical: Theatre Goers Choice Awards 2009 (Nominee)
- Best Choreographer – Karen Bruce: Theatre Goers Choice Awards 2009 (Nominee)
- Best Supporting Actress – Sophia Ragavelas (Playing Chloe Turner): Theatre Goers Choice Awards 2009 (Nominee)
- Best Touring Production: Theatre Goers Choice Awards 2008 (Nominee)
