= Take That discography =

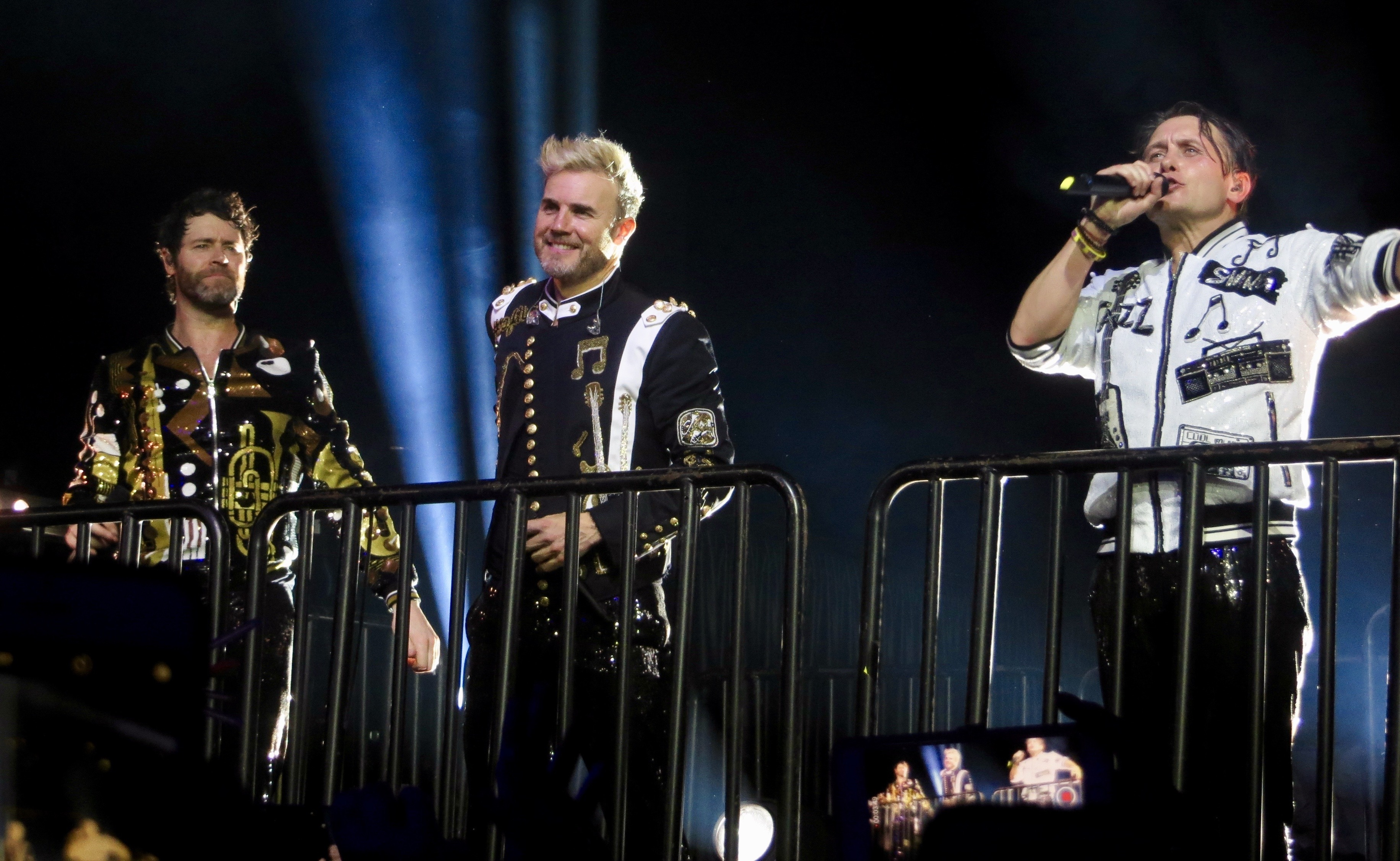
- Take That performing in 2017
- Studio albums: 10
- Extended plays: 1
- Live albums: 3
- Compilation albums: 2
- Singles: 49
- Video albums: 14
- Music videos: 42
- Box sets: 2

The discography of Take That, a British pop music group, consists of ten studio albums, two compilation albums, thirty-three singles, three live albums, one extended play and fourteen video albums.

Take That made their debut in the United Kingdom in 1991 with "Do What U Like". "Promises" and then "Once You've Tasted Love" followed in 1992. They were only minor hits in the UK. The band's breakthrough single was a cover of the 1975 Tavares hit "It Only Takes a Minute", which peaked at number seven on the UK Singles Chart. This success was followed by the track "I Found Heaven" and "A Million Love Songs", top 15 and top 10 singles respectively. Their cover of the Barry Manilow disco hit "Could It Be Magic" was their biggest hit to date, peaking at number three in the UK. Their first album, Take That & Party, was also released in 1992. The following year saw the release of their second album Everything Changes. It spawned four UK number one singles; "Pray", "Relight My Fire", "Babe" and the title track "Everything Changes". The sixth single "Love Ain't Here Anymore" reached number three. Everything Changes also saw the band gain international success. In 1995 came their third album, Nobody Else, containing another 3 UK number ones. After the first single "Sure" was released, the second single from the album, "Back for Good" became their biggest hit single reaching number one in 31 countries around the world. In the summer of 1995 band member Robbie Williams left the band. Undaunted by the loss, Take That continued to promote Nobody Else as a four-piece, scoring another UK number one single with "Never Forget". In February 1996 Take That formally announced that they were disbanding. This was followed by the Greatest Hits compilation, which contained a new recording, a cover of the Bee Gees' "How Deep Is Your Love", the band's eighth number one single.

In November 2005, the band returned to the UK Albums Chart with Never Forget – The Ultimate Collection, a new compilation of their hit singles, which reached number 2. In May 2006, the band announced they were reforming after ten years. The band's comeback album Beautiful World, entered the UK Albums Chart at number one and is currently the 35th best selling album in UK music history. The first single from the album, "Patience" was released in November 2006 and reached number one in its second week staying there for four weeks. This was followed by "Shine", another number one single. Other singles released were "I'd Wait for Life" and hit single "Rule the World", a UK number two over the Christmas period of 2007. The first single "Greatest Day" from their next album, The Circus, debuted at number one in the UK in November 2008. The album followed a week later and also debuted at number one. The album's second single "Up All Night", peaked at number fourteen in the UK and was followed by "Said It All" peaking at number nine. In November 2009, Take That released their first live album, The Greatest Day – Take That Present: The Circus Live which reached number 3 in the UK and went platinum.

The following year, Take That announced they were to re-form as a five-piece and release an album. This album was titled Progress and was released on 15 November. It debuted at number 1, selling 235,000 copies on its first day and 520,000 copies in its first week becoming the second fastest selling album of all time. It achieved success across Europe debuting at number one in seven countries and top 10 in many others. In 2014, their seventh studio album, III, was released. Their first studio album since 2010's Progress, it was the first to feature the band as a trio, following the departures of Jason Orange and Robbie Williams. The album was released on 28 November 2014 and went to number one in the UK, preceded by lead single "These Days" which became their 12th number one UK single.

In 2016 they announced their eighth studio album, Wonderland, released on 24 March 2017.

They released their ninth studio album This Life on 24 November 2023.

== Albums ==
=== Studio albums ===
List of albums, with selected chart positions, sales, and certifications
Title	Details	Peak chart positions										Sales	Certifications
Title	Details	UK	AUS	AUT	DEN	GER	IRE	ITA	NLD	SWE	SWI	Sales	Certifications
Take That & Party	Released: 17 August 1992; Label: RCA (#74321109232); Formats: CD, cassette, LP	2	104	—	—	28	27	—	21	38	—	UK: 870,000	UK: 2× Platinum
Everything Changes	Released: 11 October 1993; Label: RCA (#74321169262); Formats: CD, cassette, LP	1	24	7	6	4	4	13	3	27	9	UK: 1,300,000	UK: 4× Platinum; AUT: Gold; GER: Platinum; ITA: Platinum; NLD: Platinum; SWE: Gold; SWI: Platinum
Nobody Else	Released: 1 May 1995; Label: RCA (#74321279092); Formats: CD, cassette	1	2	1	3	1	1	1	1	7	1	UK: 680,000	UK: 2× Platinum; AUS: Gold; AUT: Gold; GER: Gold; ITA: 4× Platinum; NLD: Gold; SWE: Gold; SWI: Gold
Beautiful World	Released: 27 November 2006; Label: Polydor (#1715551); Formats: CD, digital download	1	32	8	2	2	1	25	33	40	6	UK: 2,800,000	UK: 9× Platinum; DEN: Platinum; GER: Platinum; IRE: 2× Platinum; ITA: Gold; SWI: Gold
The Circus	Released: 1 December 2008; Label: Polydor (#1787444); Formats: CD, digital download	1	180	42	13	14	1	32	68	25	22	UK: 2,200,000	UK: 7× Platinum; DEN: Gold; IRE: 8× Platinum
Progress	Released: 15 November 2010; Label: Polydor (#275592-7); Formats: CD, digital download	1	65	2	1	1	1	3	4	7	2	UK: 2,400,000	UK: 8× Platinum; AUT: Platinum; DEN: 2× Platinum; GER: Platinum; IRE: 6× Platinum; ITA: Platinum; NLD: Platinum; SWE: Gold; SWI: Gold
III	Released: 1 December 2014; Label: Polydor (#4709218); Formats: CD, digital download	1	263	—	23	26	6	39	64	—	59	UK: 579,000	UK: Platinum
Wonderland	Released: 24 March 2017; Label: Polydor (#4709218); Formats: CD, digital download, LP	2	28	47	—	19	3	36	48	—	28		UK: Gold
This Life	Released: 24 November 2023; Label: EMI; Formats: CD, digital download, LP	1	—	39	—	8	1	47	84	—	14		UK: Gold
Dreamers	Released: 20 November 2026; Label: EMI; Formats: CD, digital download, LP	—	—	—	—	—	—	—	—	—	—		
"—" denotes album that did not chart or was not released

=== Live albums ===
Title	Details	Peak chart positions		Sales	Certifications
Title	Details	UK	IRE	Sales	Certifications
The Greatest Day – Take That Present: The Circus Live	Released: 30 November 2009; Label: Polydor; Formats: CD, digital download	3	16	UK: 300,000	UK: Platinum; IRE: Platinum
Progress Live	Released: 28 November 2011; Label: Polydor; Formats: CD, digital download	12	24	UK: 100,000	UK: Gold
Odyssey: Greatest Hits Live	Released: 15 November 2019; Label: Polydor; Formats: CD, digital download, streaming	5	—		

=== Compilation albums ===
List of albums, with selected chart positions, sales, and certifications
Title	Details	Peak chart positions										Sales	Certifications
Title	Details	UK	AUS	AUT	DEN	GER	IRE	ITA	NLD	SWE	SWI	Sales	Certifications
Greatest Hits	Released: 25 March 1996; Label: RCA (#74321355582); Formats: CD, cassette	1	10	1	1	1	1	1	1	4	2	UK: 1,200,00	UK: 4× Platinum; AUS: Gold; AUT: Platinum; GER: Platinum; NLD: Platinum; SWE: Gold; SWI: Platinum
The Best of Take That	Released: 17 October 2001; Label: Calipso; Formats: CD, cassette	—	—	—	—	—	—	—	—	—	—		
Forever... Greatest Hits	Released: 21 March 2002; Label: BMG; Formats: CD, cassette	—	—	—	—	—	—	—	—	—	—		
Never Forget – The Ultimate Collection	Released: 14 November 2005; Label: RCA (#82876748522); Formats: CD, digital download	2	72	—	—	91	12	—	—	—	73	UK: 2,360,000	UK: 8× Platinum
Odyssey	Released: 23 November 2018; Label: Polydor	1	63	55	—	18	3	80	85	—	45	UK: 300.000	UK: Platinum
"—" denotes album that did not chart or was not released

=== Import ===
Title	Details	Peak chart positions
Title	Details	UK
Nobody Else (US version)	Released: 26 August 1995; Label: Arista/RCA; Formats: CD	26

=== Box sets ===
Title	Details	Certifications
The Platinum Collection	Released: 27 November 2006; Label: RCA (#88697058062); Formats: CD, digital download	UK: Silver

== Extended plays ==
Title	Details	Peak chart positions					
Title	Details	UK^{[A]}	DEN	IRE^{[A]}	ITA	GER	NLD
Progressed	Released: 10 June 2011; Label: Polydor; Formats: CD, digital download	1	1	2	25	11	21

- A In certain territories, Progressed charted in conjunction with Progress under the same title.

== Singles ==
=== As lead artist ===
List of singles, with selected chart positions and certifications, showing year released and album name
Title	Year	Peak chart positions										Certifications	Album
Title	Year	UK	AUS	DEN	GER	IRE	ITA	NLD	SWE	SWI	US	Certifications	Album
"Do What U Like"	1991	82	—	—	—	—	—	—	—	—	—		Take That & Party
"Promises"	1991	38	—	—	—	—	—	—	—	—	—		Take That & Party
"Once You've Tasted Love"	1992	47	188	—	—	—	—	—	—	—	—		Take That & Party
"It Only Takes a Minute"	1992	7	191	—	—	11	—	—	—	—	—		Take That & Party
"I Found Heaven"	1992	15	—	—	56	—	—	—	—	—	—		Take That & Party
"A Million Love Songs"	1992	7	—	—	—	—	—	50	—	—	—	UK: Gold	Take That & Party
"Could It Be Magic"	1992	3	30	28	37	3	—	—	30	—	—	UK: Silver	Take That & Party
"Why Can't I Wake Up with You"	1993	2	—	—	68	7	—	—	—	—	—	UK: Silver	Everything Changes
"Pray"	1993	1	10	14	21	2	—	38	17	24	—	UK: Gold	Everything Changes
"Relight My Fire" (featuring Lulu)	1993	1	33	19	18	2	—	10	32	18	—	UK: Platinum	Everything Changes
"Babe"	1993	1	—	16	9	1	22	5	7	8	—	UK: Platinum; GER: Gold	Everything Changes
"Everything Changes"	1994	1	58	4	17	2	—	7	—	22	—	UK: Gold	Everything Changes
"Love Ain't Here Anymore"	1994	3	38	6	39	4	—	24	—	—	—	UK: Silver	Everything Changes
"Sure"	1994	1	31	3	24	3	4	15	30	24	—	UK: Silver; ITA: Platinum	Nobody Else
"Back for Good"	1995	1	1	2	1	1	5	2	2	2	7	UK: 2× Platinum; AUS: Platinum; AUT: Gold; DEN: Platinum; GER: Gold; ITA: Platinum; RMNZ: Platinum	Nobody Else
"Never Forget"	1995	1	12	3	10	1	8	8	34	6	—	UK: Platinum	Nobody Else
"How Deep Is Your Love"	1996	1	12	1	7	1	1	7	7	5	—	UK: Platinum; ITA: Platinum	Greatest Hits
"Patience"	2006	1	29	6	1	2	2	12	6	1	—	UK: 2× Platinum; DEN: Platinum; GER: Gold; ITA: Platinum	Beautiful World
"Shine"	2007	1	—	7	21	2	4	20	—	27	—	UK: 2× Platinum; DEN: Gold; ITA: Platinum	Beautiful World
"I'd Wait for Life"	2007	17	—	—	—	32	13	—	—	—	—		Beautiful World
"Reach Out"	2007	—	—	13	44	—	11	—	—	—	—		Beautiful World
"Rule the World"	2007	2	—	32	15	3	6	57	—	25	—	UK: 3× Platinum; ITA: Platinum	Beautiful World
"Greatest Day"	2008	1	—	28	27	2	—	30	41	—	—	UK: 2× Platinum	The Circus
"Up All Night"	2009	14	—	—	—	14	—	—	—	—	—	UK: Silver	The Circus
"The Garden"	2009	97	—	8	20	—	—	73	—	36	—		The Circus
"Said It All"	2009	9	—	—	—	17	—	—	—	—	—	UK: Silver	The Circus
"Hold Up a Light"	2009	—	—	—	—	—	—	—	—	—	—		The Circus
"The Flood"	2010	2	—	4	12	3	2	3	24	6	—	UK: Platinum; DEN: Gold; GER: Gold; ITA: Platinum	Progress
"Kidz"	2011	28	—	12	20	45	24	—	—	—	—	UK: Silver	Progress
"Love Love"	2011	15	—	—	—	27	37	—	—	—	—		Progressed
"When We Were Young"	2011	88	—	—	—	—	—	—	—	—	—		Progressed
"These Days"	2014	1	—	—	31	8	—	—	—	—	—	UK: Platinum	III
"Let in the Sun"	2015	— (Note: "Let in the Sun" did not enter the UK Singles Chart Top 100 but peaked at number 93 on the UK Singles Downloads Chart on 1 March 2015.)	—	—	—	—	—	—	—	—	—		III
"Higher Than Higher"	2015	—	—	—	—	—	—	—	—	—	—		III
"Hey Boy"	2015	56	—	—	—	—	—	—	—	—	—		III (2015 Edition)
"Giants"	2017	13	—	—	—	86	—	—	—	—	—	UK: Silver	Wonderland
"New Day"	2017	—	—	—	—	—	—	—	—	—	—		Wonderland
"Pray" (Odyssey version)	2018	—	—	—	—	—	—	—	—	—	—		Odyssey
"Out of Our Heads"	2018	— (Note: "Out of Our Heads" did not enter the UK Singles Chart, but peaked at number 25 on the UK Download Chart.)	—	—	—	—	—	—	—	—	—		Odyssey
"Greatest Day" (Robin Schulz rework; featuring Calum Scott)	2023	— (Note: "Greatest Day" featuring Calum Scott did not enter the UK Singles Chart, but peaked at number 7 on the UK Download Chart.)	—	—	—	—	—	—	—	—	—		Greatest Days: The Movie Soundtrack
"Windows"	2023	— (Note: "Windows" did not enter the UK Top 100 but debuted and peaked at number 3 on the UK Singles Downloads Chart Top 100 on 29 September 2023.)	—	—	—	—	—	—	—	—	—		This Life
"Brand New Sun"	2023	—	—	—	—	—	—	—	—	—	—		This Life
"This Life"	2023	— (Note: "This Life" did not enter the UK Top 100 but peaked at number 21 on the UK Singles Downloads Chart Top 100 on 24 November 2023.)	—	—	—	—	—	—	—	—	—		This Life
"You and Me"	2024	— (Note: "You and Me" did not enter the UK singles Chart but peaked at number 4 on the UK Singles Downloads Chart.)	—	—	—	—	—	—	—	—	—		This Life (Deluxe)
"All Wrapped Up"	2024	— (Note: "All Wrapped Up" did not enter the UK Singles Chart but peaked at number 32 on the UK Singles Downloads Chart.)	—	—	—	—	—	—	—	—	—		This Life (Deluxe)
"Said It All" (featuring Leony; Jax Jones rework)	2026	— (Note: "Said It All" featuring Leony did not enter the UK Singles Chart, but peaked at number 37 on the UK Download Chart.)	—	—	—	—	—	—	—	—	—		Non-album single
"You’re a Superstar"	2026	— (Note: "You're a Superstar" did not enter the UK Singles Chart, but peaked at number 9 on the UK Download Chart.)	—	—	—	—	—	—	—	—	—		Dreamers
"Sweet July"	2026	— (Note: "Sweet July" did not enter the UK Singles Chart, but peaked at number 2 on the UK Download Chart.)	—	—	—	—	—	—	—	—	—		Dreamers
"Feel My Love" (with Michael Patrick Kelly)	2026	— (Note: "Feel My Love" did not enter the UK Singles Chart Top 100, but debuted at number 12 on the UK Singles Downloads Chart.)	—	—	—	—	—	—	—	—	—		Dreamers
"Dreamers"	2026	— (Note: "Dreamers" did not enter the UK Top 100 but peaked at number 50 on the UK Singles Downloads Chart Top 100 on 9 October 2026.)	—	—	—	—	—	—	—	—	—	—	Dreamers
"Higher"	2026	— (Note: "Higher" did not enter the UK Top 100 but peaked at number 31 on the UK Singles Downloads Chart Top 100 on 23 October 2026.)	—	—	—	—	—	—	—	—	—	—	Dreamers
"—" denotes releases that did not chart or were not released in that territory.

=== As featured artist ===
Title	Year	Peak chart positions							Certifications	Album
Title	Year	UK	AUS	AUT	GER	IRE	SWE	SWI	Certifications	Album
"Everybody Hurts" (with Helping Haiti)	2010	1	28	23	16	1	21	16	UK: Platinum	Non-album single
"Cry" (Sigma featuring Take That)	2016	21	—	—	—	65	—	—	UK: Silver	Wonderland (Deluxe)
"—" denotes releases that did not chart or were not released in that territory.

=== Promotional singles ===
Title	Year	Peak chart positions	Album
Title	Year	UK	Album
"Every Guy"	1995	—	Nobody Else
"Relight My Fire" (Element Remix)	2005	—	Never Forget – The Ultimate Collection
"Hold Up a Light"	2009	—	The Greatest Day – Take That Present: The Circus Live
"Happy Now"	2011	52	Progress
"Eight Letters"	2011	—	Progress
"The Man I Am"	2024	— (Note: "The Man I Am" did not enter the UK Singles Chart but peaked at number 81 on the UK Singles Downloads Chart.)	This Life (Deluxe edition)
"—" denotes releases that did not chart or were not released in that territory.

== Other charted songs ==
Title	Year	Peak chart positions	Album
Title	Year	UK	Album
"SOS"	2010	91	Progress

== Music videos ==
Title	Year	Notes	Director(s)
"Do What U Like"	1991		Rosemary "Ro" Barratt (née Newton) & Angie Smith
"Promises"	1991		Willy Smax
"Once You've Tasted Love"	1992		James Lebon
"It Only Takes a Minute"	1992		Willy Smax
"I Found Heaven"	1992		Willy Smax
"A Million Love Songs"	1992		Brad Langford
"Could It Be Magic"	1992		Saffie Ashtiany
"Why Can't I Wake Up with You?"	1993		Liam Kan & Grant Hodgson
"Pray"	1993		Gregg Masuak
"Relight My Fire"	1993		Jimmy Fletcher
"Babe"	1993		Gregg Masuak
"Beatles Medley"	1993	Video recorded especially for the Everything Changes video album	
"Everything Changes"	1994		Gregg Masuak
"Love Ain't Here Anymore"	1994		Liam Kan & Grant Hodgson
"Sure"	1994		Gregg Masuak
"Back for Good"	1995		Vaughan Arnell & Anthea Benton
"Never Forget"	1995		David Amphlett
"Sunday to Saturday"	1995	Video recorded especially for the Japanese market	Philip Ollerenshaw
"How Deep is Your Love"	1996		Nick Brandt
"Relight My Fire" (Element Remix)	2005	Unreleased	
"Patience"	2006		David Mould
"Shine"	2007		Justin Dickel
"I'd Wait for Life"	2007		Sean de Sparengo
"Rule the World"	2007	Clips from the film Stardust	Barney Clay
"Rule the World" (alternate version)	2007	Removes the clips from the film Stardust	Barney Clay
"Greatest Day"	2008		Meiert Avis & Chris LeDoux
"Up All Night"	2009		Daniel Wolfe
"Said It All"	2009		Lindy Heymann
"Hold Up a Light"	2009	Live performance from The Circus Live	Matt Askem
"The Flood"	2010		Mat Whitecross
"Kidz"	2011		Mat Whitecross & Eran Creevy
"Happy Now"	2011	Released exclusively for Red Nose Day 2011	Tom Harper & Richard Curtis
"Love Love"	2011	Band version	AlexandLiane
"Love Love"	2011	Features clips from the film X-Men: First Class	AlexandLiane
"When We Were Young"	2011	Features clips from the film The Three Musketeers	Paul Gore
"Eight Letters"	2011	Released to promote the Progress Live album and DVD. Features footage from the tour	Matt Askem
"These Days"	2014		Henry Scholfield
"Let in the Sun"	2015		Mike Sharpe
"Hey Boy"	2015		Frank Borin
"Get Ready for It"	2015	Features clips from the film Kingsman: The Secret Service	Vaughan Arnell
"Cry"	2016	Sigma featuring Take That	Georgia Hudson
"Giants"	2017		Mat Whitecross
"New Day"	2017		Gregg Masuak
"Pray (Odyssey Edition)"	2018		
"Out of Our Heads"	2018		
"Windows"	2023		Ben Tricklebank
"You and Me"	2024		
"Sweet July"	2026		

== Video/DVD releases ==
Title	Details	Notes	Certifications
Take That & Party	Released: 1992; Label: Sony BMG (#); Format: VHS	Promotional music videos from the Take That & Party album and interviews with the group.	UK: Gold
Take That: The Party Live at Wembley	Released: 1 November 1993; Label: Sony BMG (#74321164493); Format: VHS	Live concert from Wembley Arena, London, 1993	UK: Platinum
Take That – Everything Changes	Released: 18 July 1994; Label: Sony BMG (#); Format: VHS	Features promotional music videos from the Everything Changes album.; Also includes exclusive interviews with the band members.	UK: 3× Platinum
Take That: Live in Berlin	Released: 15 May 1995; Label: Sony BMG (#74321123373); Format: VHS	Take That Live in concert in Berlin, 1994	UK: 3× Platinum
Hometown: Live at Manchester G-Mex	Released: 14 August 1995; Studio: Sony BMG (#74321284153); Format: VHS	Featuring Take That recorded Live in Manchester, 1994	UK: 2× Platinum
Take That: Nobody Else "the Movie"	Released: 20 November 1995; Studio: Sony BMG (#74321332253); Format: VHS	Documentary telling the story of the band's appearances at London's Earls Court and Manchester Arena during the summer of 1995.	UK: 2× Platinum
'Greatest Hits	Released: 25 March 1996; Studio: BMG (#74321355683); Formats: VHS, laserdisc	A compilation of Take That's greatest hits. Also never-seen-before footage of the boys throughout their career.	UK: Platinum
Never Forget – The Ultimate Collection	Released: 14 November 2005; Studio: Sony BMG (#82876748539); Format: DVD	Features 16 music videos, including all the number one hits, as well as live performances and behind-the-scenes film footage and photos.	UK: Platinum
Take That: For the Record	Released: 24 April 2006; Label: Sony BMG (#82876832769); Format: DVD	Over a decade after they split the band members break their silence and reveal the truth about Take That in this intimate tell-all documentary.; Includes a special documentary as well as extended and previously unseen footage.	UK: Gold
Take That: The Ultimate Tour	Released: 6 November 2006; Studio: Universal Music (#1708380); Formats: DVD, Blu-ray Disc	Take That Live in Manchester, 2006.	UK: 5× Platinum
Beautiful World Live	Released: 25 February 2008; Studio: Polydor (#1762159); Formats: DVD, Blu-ray Disc	Take That Live at the O2 Arena, London.; The fastest selling music DVD in UK history.	UK: 3× Platinum
Take That Present: The Circus Live	Released: 23 November 2009; Studio: Polydor; Formats: DVD, Blu-ray Disc	Disc one: The Circus Live – Take That's critically acclaimed Wembley Stadium concert in its entirety.; Disc two: Live Abbey Road Session – An intimate performance by the band at Abbey Road Studios behind closed doors in late 2009.; The fastest-selling music DVD of all time in the UK, claiming this record on its first day of release.	UK: 11× Platinum
Take That: Look Back, Don't Stare	Released: 6 December 2010; Label: Polydor (#2757746); Formats: DVD, Blu-ray Disc	A set of black and white interviews and recordings detailing Robbie Williams' return to Take That and the process of them working on their first studio album together in 15 years.	UK: Platinum
Progress Live	Released: 21 November 2011; Studio: Polydor; Formats: DVD, Blu-ray Disc	Take That's record breaking Progress tour in its entirety, filmed at the Etihad stadium in Manchester.; Features a behind the scenes look at the tour preparation entitled 'Making Progress'.	UK: 7× Platinum
