= Take That (disambiguation) =

Take That is a British pop band.

Take That may also refer to:

- Take That: For the Record, a TV documentary about the band
- Take That: The Ultimate Tour, a 2006 feature-length video by the band
- "Take That" (Wiley song), 2009
- "Take That" (Torrey Carter song), 2000
- Take That (TV series), a 1950s Australian television series
