= The Ultimate Tour =

The Ultimate Tour may refer to:

- The Ultimate Tour (Take That), a 2006 reunion tour by Take That
  - Take That: The Ultimate Tour, a video release
- The Ultimate Tour (Steps), a 2012 concert tour by the Steps
