= Take That: For the Record =

Video by Take That
- Released: 22 April 2006
- Recorded: 2005
- Genre: Documentary
- Length: 70 minutes (documentary; DVD includes an additional 100 minutes of exclusive footage)
- Language: English
- Label: BMG
- Director: David Notman-Watt
- Producer: Back2Back Productions

Take That chronology
Never Forget – The Ultimate Collection (2005)	Take That: For the Record (2006)	Take That: The Ultimate Tour (2006)

Take That: For the Record is a television documentary about the English boy band Take That. It was originally screened in 2005, a decade after the group had originally split up.

== Release information ==
Take That: For the Record is a documentary recording of the first reunion since the band's 1996 split. Aired on 17 November 2005, it reached an audience of over six million viewers.

Marking the tenth anniversary since the group's disbandment, the documentary featured all the members of Take That in recorded interviews, including former member Robbie Williams, who was not physically present at their reunion. The production company, Back2back productions, won a Grierson Award for Best Documentary on the Arts.

Following the telecast of the documentary and subsequent interest in the band, Take That announced they were to go on tour again. The band's Ultimate Tour 2006 was also recorded and released on the video release Take That: The Ultimate Tour the following year. The documentary was released on DVD in April 2006. The DVD also contains over 100 minutes of rare and previously unseen footage, including clips of Howard Donald's unreleased single "Speak Without Words".

== Synopsis ==
The documentary starts with each band member describing how they were found by their manager Nigel Martin-Smith, who acknowledges that a demo tape from Gary Barlow with a song called "A Million Love Songs" triggered his decision to form a band.

Reviewing their early years, the band comment on their early performances in schools and gay clubs as well as their first single, "Do What U Like". Gary acknowledges that neither the song nor the video was brilliant, but they were important in helping the band getting noticed. Their follow-up single "Promises" is shown as they remember themselves going around the country performing roadshows and Robbie Williams remembering his fascination with the song being their first chart entry. Barlow admits he felt defeated releasing a cover version of Tavares's 1970s hit "It Only Takes a Minute" in order to get officially noticed by the world.

Looking back on their first No. 1 single "Pray", Barlow claims he was determined to write an unbelievable second album (Everything Changes), and believes it was the first song that allowed people to take them seriously, despite their image becoming dominated by sexy images of the band and realising how successful they had become, primarily with girls becoming obsessed with them. Jason Orange reflects on his friendship with Lulu following the success of their cover version of Dan Hartman's 1970s hit "Relight My Fire", stating that she met the success of the band very well despite Nigel Martin-Smith stating that the record company preferred a black diva. Fans interviewed tell that the life of a Take That fan revolved entirely around the band. Security guards escorting the band reflect on the danger and harm that was caused by pulling the band through crowds and protecting them from obscene behaviour from fans. Following on from the band's split, the film depicts the hurt and pain felt by devoted fans and the suicide counselling lines that were set up for young women.

The documentary details the cracks that began to form after the band achieved success, with the band acknowledging that the arguments between them were escalating to greater degrees, and that perhaps too much money was coming in for them to handle. The film's main focus on this is the drug and alcohol abuse from Williams, with the band acknowledging that they would never have guessed the amount of booze and drugs he was taking. Barlow says they always saw him as a lively person who never wanted to be taken seriously.

The band claim the reasons behind Williams's departure from the group were due to drug abuse, as well as friction with Barlow and Orange. Williams admits that he had experimented with different kinds of drugs before joining the band, and that "I was sort of heading into that direction anyway." Mark Owen confesses he never knew the extent of William's problems, admitting his bandmate hid them well. After the group confronted Williams about his erratic behaviour, they gave him an ultimatum to change his ways or leave the band. Upon learning they were planning to tour as a four-piece, he angrily vowed to quit Take That and stormed off. Nigel Martin-Smith stated he sued Williams for £200,000 in commission following his departure, and expresses he feels sorry and sad for Williams to this day after claiming Williams is ungrateful for the part Martin-Smith played in his career. In turn, Williams described Martin-Smith as "the most disturbing person I've worked with" and confesses he only wanted love and acceptance from him.

The band says they pulled together and finished off the tour without Williams, without thought for what he was doing; however, upon finishing the tour, they realised the band was no longer fun for them and decided it was time to call it a day. When the group finally announced the break-up in 1996, Martin-Smith revealed that Howard Donald was the only one who wanted to keep the band going and did not want it to end. Donald then admitted that he considered committing suicide by jumping in the River Thames, but he was too scared to follow through. Martin-Smith expresses shock over Donald's suicidal thoughts and admits he never knew about it. Following the split, the film reflects on the brief media hype that saw Barlow and Williams battling for highest record sales, with Barlow defending his first album Open Road, but admitted he felt as though he was repeating old ground.

Williams claims that he was at his worst with alcohol and drugs at the time of the hype between him and Barlow, but he clearly remembers hearing Barlow's solo work and not rating it at all. At the time, Williams was becoming a powerful influence in the media following his worldwide hit single "Angels" and made his feelings public on Barlow's work, playing a major part on Barlow's decision to leave the music industry. On his time away from the industry, Barlow stated in the film that having been dropped by record company RCA following his second album Twelve Months, Eleven Days, he felt too humiliated to continue on and was eager to leave the industry. He revealed he spent most of time in the beginning lying in bed feeling down and low, and asked if he ever wished he was Robbie Williams, Barlow stated he did not care for Williams's persona, but wished he had the same career status. He then says that he might have a more successful solo career if he tried to have a different persona than his own.

Ten years after their split, Take That meet together for the first time. Since leaving his solo career, Barlow reveals he started a family and focused exclusively on songwriting and producing. Donald briefly attempted a career by recording an album, but the album was never released and admits he went to pieces, but he nonetheless returned to the nightclub circuit as a DJ focusing on his life with his daughter from a previous relationship. Owen details his success as a solo artist and later joining another band, and Orange reveals his isolation from music and spending his time traveling the world. They learn that Williams allegedly turned down their invitation, but he filmed a video message for them (it was later revealed that Williams had been misled to believe that the other band members were sending video messages to each other). He admits he is shocked and sorry to hear of Donald's suicide attempt and jokes about their memories socialising with one another. He apologises to Orange for acting the way he did before and after he left the band, praises Owen for being the nicest person he ever met as well as a musical genius, and he apologises to Barlow for taunting his flagging solo career. Each of the members agree they should have tried to help Williams, and that they were more interested in protecting the group. In a private interview, Williams confesses that he would still be unable to get any resolve from meeting with Barlow still believing that he does not acknowledge to this day what irritated Williams so much about him, but he states that he would trade all his wealth and success for Barlow's happy family life.

The documentary ends with the group walking off, with the narrator acknowledging the path they laid for acts such as the Spice Girls and Boyzone, and with "Never Forget" playing over the end credits.

== Reception and band reunion ==
Following the film's critical reception from fans and the press, on 25 November 2005, nine days after the film aired, the post-Williams line-up announced the film had inspired them to reunite and tour their greatest hits, naming the tour The Ultimate Tour.

Following the success of the tour, the band decided to record new material and their first album since the break-up, Beautiful World, although Williams opted not to be involved.

The success of their work led the band back to mainstream fame, and they have continued to produce new albums and tour since. 2010 saw the return of Robbie Williams to the line-up and the release of the first album with all five band members since 1995, Progress. Prior to that, Williams had been regaining contact with his former bandmates and eventually reconciled with Barlow in 2008. Williams later left again to focus on his family life and his solo career, but his departure was on amicable terms and he has since reunited several times with the band. Orange left later in 2014, stating that he did not wish to continue recording music and touring. The band have since recorded and released three studio albums as a trio: III (2014), Wonderland (2017) and This Life (2023).

== Release history ==
Region	Date	Label
United States	22 April 2006	Sony BMG Europe
International	24 April 2006	Sony BMG Europe
