= I'm Out (disambiguation) =

"I'm Out" is a song by Ciara

I'm Out may also refer to:

- "I'm Out", song by Take That in the single release of I Found Heaven, 1992
- "I'm Out", song by Shannon Bex, 2012
- "I'm Out", song by Keyakizaka46 in Ambivalent, 2018
