= Take That: The Ultimate Tour =

Video by Take That
- Released: (Europe) 23 October 2006
- Recorded: 17 & 18 June 2006; Etihad Stadium, Manchester UK
- Genre: Pop
- Length: 112 minutes
- Language: English
- Label: Polydor

Take That chronology
Take That: For the Record (2006)	Take That: The Ultimate Tour (2006)	Beautiful World Live (2008)

Take That: The Ultimate Tour is a video by boyband Take That.

== Release information ==
The video features a full-length concert of Take That recorded at the Etihad Stadium in Manchester on 17 and 18 June 2006 during the "Ultimate Tour 2006" it was released in the UK on 6 November 2006 and internationally on 7 December 2006. A limited-edition version of the video was also released on 23 October 2006, containing a bonus CD with 5 of their previous hit singles.

The DVD release does not include "Sure" (which was mixed with the Gorillaz version of "Dirty Harry" for the tour), usually performed between "Apache 2006" and "Relight My Fire" for an unknown reason. However a few seconds of the footage can be seen in the various DVD menus.

The DVD was re-released on 5 November 2007 on HD DVD and Blu-ray Disc.

== Track listing ==
DVD

1. "Once You've Tasted Love"
2. "Pray"
3. "Today I Lost You"
4. "Why Can't I Wake Up With You"
5. "It Only Takes A Minute"
6. "Babe"
7. "Everything Changes"
8. "A Million Love Songs"
9. "Beatles Medley: I Want to Hold Your Hand / A Hard Day's Night / She Loves You / I Feel Fine / Get Back / Hey Jude"
10. "How Deep Is Your Love"
11. "Love Ain't Here Anymore"
12. "Apache 2006"
13. "Relight My Fire"
14. "Let It Rain"
15. "Back For Good"
16. "Could It Be Magic"
17. "Never Forget"

Bonus Limited Edition Audio CD

1. "Pray" (Live from Manchester)
2. "Babe" (Live from Manchester)
3. "Everything Changes" (Live from Manchester)
4. "A Million Love Songs" (Live from Manchester)
5. "Back For Good" (Live from Manchester)

== Release history ==
Region	Date	Label
Europe	23 October 2006	Universal Music Operations
Europe	6 November 2006	Universal Music Operations
International	7 December 2006	Universal Music Operations
Europe	5 November 2007	Universal Music Operations
