= Take That & Party =

Studio album by Take That
- Released: 17 August 1992
- Recorded: 1991–1992
- Genres: Pop; dance
- Length: 51:30
- Label: RCA
- Producers: Duncan Bridgeman; Ian Curnow; Billy Griffin; Pete Hammond; Phil Harding; Ray Hedges; Ian Levine; The Rapino Brothers; Graham Stack; Nigel Wright

Take That chronology
Take That & Party (1992)	Everything Changes (1993)

Alternative covers
- Japanese cover

Singles from Take That & Party
- 1. "Do What U Like" Released: 12 July 1991; 2. "Promises" Released: 18 November 1991; 3. "Once You've Tasted Love" Released: 3 February 1992; 4. "It Only Takes a Minute" Released: 1 June 1992; 5. "I Found Heaven" Released: 10 August 1992; 6. "A Million Love Songs" Released: 5 October 1992; 7. "Could It Be Magic" Released: 30 November 1992

Take That & Party is the debut album by the English boy band Take That. Released on 17 August 1992 on RCA Records, it reached number 2 on the UK Albums Chart and stayed in the UK Top 75 album chart for seventy-three weeks (almost eighteen months). It was their only album not to reach number 1 until Wonderland also peaked at number 2 in 2017. Take That & Party won Best Album at the 1992 Smash Hits Awards.

The album has been certified two times Platinum in the United Kingdom. As of October 1995, the album had sold 1.5 million copies worldwide.

== Background ==
In 1989, the Manchester-based music mogul Nigel Martin-Smith sought to create a British male vocal group in the vein of New Kids On The Block, his vision being a teen-oriented group with multi-demographic appeal. Martin-Smith was introduced to young singer-songwriter Gary Barlow, and was so impressed with his catalogue of material he decided to build his new-look boy band around Barlow's musical abilities. A campaign to audition young males with abilities in dancing and singing ensued, taking place in Manchester and other surrounding cities, in 1990. At 22, Howard Donald was one of the oldest to audition, and was chosen after he got time off work as a vehicle painter to continue the process.

Martin-Smith soon managed to land them a slot on television series The Hit Man and Her in 1990. The group chose to perform two of Barlow's tracks, "Love" and "Girl", neither of which has ever been commercially released, or known to be recorded.

== Production ==
Martin-Smith got the group a studio session with music producer Ray Hedges for which Barlow wrote "Do What U Like," "Take That and Party," and "Waiting Around," the first three tracks written specifically to be recorded by the group. "Do What U Like" was released as the lead single on Martin-Smith's own label Dance UK on 15 July 1991, with "Waiting Around" appearing as the B-side, and "Take That & Party" being sidelined for release on their debut album.

The single, despite peaking at #82, was enough for Take That to be noticed by RCA Records, who signed them to their label and put them in contact with one of their most prolific songwriters, Graham Stack. Stack and Barlow then co-wrote the group's debut single on RCA, "Promises," which was released on 18 November 1991. Shortly after the single peaked at #38 the band began recording again, this time with producers Billy Griffin and Ian Levine, with "Once You've Tasted Love" being the first single released from those sessions. Although it peaked at #47, Take That was given one last chance by the record label.

Levine and Griffin persuaded the group's handlers to release a cover of the 1975 Tavares hit "It Only Takes a Minute;" despite the group's apprehensions, it peaked at #7 on the UK Singles Chart. For the release, they recorded "I Can Make It" and "Never Want to Let You Go," two original tracks penned by Barlow, both of which later made the album release in slightly remixed form.

Riding the crest of this wave, "I Found Heaven," written by Griffin and Levine, was released as their next single. Group member Robbie Williams performed a shared lead vocal, a first for him. It was not as successful as its predecessor, however, peaking at No. 15. During the recording of this song, the group experienced a falling-out with Levine, and requested that they not record or write with him in the future. The single's B-side, "I'm Out," was written about this situation.

RCA subsequently enlisted the services of executive producer Duncan Bridgeman, who decided to change the direction of the band's music style, and chose to record "A Million Love Songs," penned by Barlow when he was just fifteen years old. The single was a success, also peaking at #7 on the UK Singles Chart. After positive reception by critics, Bridgeman then decided to release as a single the group's cover of the Barry Manilow classic "Could It Be Magic," recorded shortly after their version of "It Only Takes a Minute." "Could It Be Magic" was the first song recorded featuring Williams on lead vocal. It peaked at #3 on the UK Singles Chart. During Bridgeman's time with the group they also recorded "Why Can't I Wake Up With You," a saxophone-assisted ballad, which was later reworked into an electronically advanced number and released as the lead single from their second album Everything Changes.

== Release ==
The album was released on 17 August 1992 in various formats, including a limited-edition vinyl pressing and cassette, containing twelve tracks. "Could It Be Magic" was first released on the compact disc version of the album, so vinyl and cassette copies do not contain the track. Take That & Party peaked at number two in the UK in early January 1993, 20 weeks after the album's release. British boyband contemporaries East 17 would reach number one the following month with debut album, Walthamstow, signalling this period as the start of boyband mania in the UK.

Take That & Party's track listing included "Satisfied" and "Give Good Feeling," two tracks recorded during the time with Levine and Griffin, which had remained unreleased until that point.

Around the time of the original album release, a VHS videocassette titled Take That and Party was also released, containing eight music videos, two compilation videos, a live a cappella performance, plus footage and interviews with the group.

The album was re-issued in July 2006 to celebrate the group's 15th anniversary, complete with three bonus tracks, including the B-sides "Waiting Around" and "Guess Who Tasted Love," as well as "How Can It Be," one of three songs written to accompany the release of "A Million Love Songs".

== Reception ==
Professional ratings
Review scores
Source	Rating
AllMusic	3/5 stars
The Encyclopedia of Popular Music	3/5 stars
The Gazette	C

In a contemporary review, The Gazette gave the album a C rating, noting that although "This album starts with '90s dance music but sometimes takes you back to the era of disco and polyester, a time that most people would rather forget, [it] is tolerable only because the rest of the album is good."

Peter Fawthrop of AllMusic noted that the album embodies a distinctly youthful sound, capturing the group's early phase while highlighting Gary Barlow's impressive songwriting maturity, as he penned most of the tracks at a very young age. The review emphasizes a sense of nostalgia, particularly when hearing Robbie Williams on "Could It Be Magic", which evokes a moment of lost innocence before his later personal struggles and eventual rise to solo superstardom. Although the album follows familiar boy-band formulas, its natural, homespun quality is presented as a key element of its appeal.

== Track listing ==
All tracks are written by Gary Barlow, except where noted.

No.	Title	Writer(s)	Producer(s)	Length
1.	"I Found Heaven" (lead vocals: Williams, Barlow)	Ian Levine; Billy Griffin	Levine; Griffin	4:01
2.	"Once You've Tasted Love" (lead vocals: Barlow, Rap: Williams)		Duncan Bridgeman	3:43
3.	"It Only Takes a Minute" (lead vocals: Barlow, Williams)	Dennis Lambert; Brian Potter	Nigel Wright	3:46
4.	"A Million Love Songs" (lead vocals: Barlow)		Levine; Griffin	3:52
5.	"Satisfied" (lead vocals: Barlow, Rap: Williams)		Bridgeman	4:29
6.	"I Can Make It" (lead vocals: Barlow)		Bridgeman	4:09
7.	"Do What U Like" (lead vocals: Barlow)	Gary Barlow; Ray Hedges	Hedges; Graham Stack^{[a]}	3:06
8.	"Promises" (lead vocals: Barlow)	Barlow; Stack	Pete Hammond	3:33
9.	"Why Can't I Wake Up with You" (lead vocals: Barlow)		Bridgeman	4:12
10.	"Never Want to Let You Go" (New Studio Mix) (lead vocals: Barlow)		Bridgeman	4:55
11.	"Give Good Feeling" (lead vocals: Barlow)		Bridgeman	4:22
12.	"Could It Be Magic" (lead vocals: Williams)	Barry Manilow; Adrienne Anderson	Levine; Griffin	4:24
13.	"Take That And Party" (lead vocals: Barlow)	Barlow; Hedges	Hammond; Phil Harding^{[a]}; Ian Curnow^{[a]}	2:54

2006 Expanded Edition Bonus Tracks
No.	Title	Producer(s)	Length
14.	"Waiting Around" (lead vocals: Barlow)	Andrew Lee; Peter Lee	2:56
15.	"How Can It Be" (lead vocals: Barlow, Owen)	Barlow	4:03
16.	"Guess Who Tasted Love" (Edit)	Bridgeman	5:21

American edition (1993)
No.	Title	Writer(s)	Producer(s)	Length
1.	"I Found Heaven"	Levine; Griffin	Levine; Griffin	4:01
2.	"Once You've Tasted Love"		Bridgeman	3:43
3.	"It Only Takes a Minute"	Lambert; Potter	Wright; Musto^{[a]}	3:45
4.	"A Million Love Songs"		Levine; Griffin	3:52
5.	"Satisfied"		Bridgeman	4:29
6.	"I Can Make It"		Bridgeman	4:10
7.	"Do What U Like"	Barlow; Hedges	Hedges; Stack^{[a]}	3:06
8.	"Promises"	Barlow; Stack	Hammond	3:34
9.	"Why Can't I Wake Up with You" (Everything Changes version)		Steve Jervier; Paul Jervier; Jonathan Wales; Mark Beswick^{[b]}	3:38
10.	"Never Want to Let You Go"		Bridgeman	4:56
11.	"Give Good Feeling"		Bridgeman	4:23
12.	"Could It Be Magic" (Radio Rapino mix)	Manilow; Anderson	Levine; Griffin; The Rapino Brothers^{[a]}	3:30
13.	"Take That and Party"	Barlow; Hedges	Hammond; Harding^{[a]}; Ian Curnow^{[a]}	2:54

VHS – Take That and Party: The Video
No.	Title	Director(s)	Length
1.	"Take That and Party" (music video)	Phillip Ollerenshaw	2:56
2.	"Do What U Like" (music video)	Rosemary Barratt	3:06
3.	"Promises" (music video)	Willy Smax	3:41
4.	"Once You've Tasted Love" (music video)	James Lebon	3:43
5.	"Why Can't I Wake Up with You" (music video)	Liam Kan	3:45
6.	"It Only Takes a Minute" (music video)	Smax	3:45
7.	"Satisfied" (music video)	Ollerenshaw	4:29
8.	"Why Can't I Wake Up with You" (live a capella performance)	Michael Max	3:32
9.	"I Found Heaven" (music video)	Smax	4:06
10.	"A Million Love Songs" (music video)	Brad Longford	3:52
11.	"Could It Be Magic" (music video)	Saffie Ashanty	3:30

Notes

- ^{^[a]} signifies a remixer
- ^{^[b]} signifies an additional vocal producer
- "Could It Be Magic" is inspired by "Prelude in C minor" by Chopin. The track is omitted from the LP version. Later 1992 pressings replace the original album version with the Radio Rapino mix; the album version was reinstated in the 2006 reissue.

== Personnel ==
- Gary Barlow – vocals, songwriting
- Howard Donald – vocals
- Jason Orange – vocals
- Mark Owen – vocals
- Robbie Williams – vocals, rapping
- Duncan Bridgeman – producer
- Tobin Sellars – engineer
- Nigel Stock – arranger
- Pete Hammond – DJ
- Ian Levine – co-producer
- Billy Griffin – co-producer

== Charts ==
=== Weekly charts ===
Chart (1992–1995)	Peak position
Australian Albums (ARIA)	104
Belgian Albums (Ultratop Flanders)	6
Dutch Albums (Album Top 100)	21
European Albums Chart	26
Finnish Albums (Suomen virallinen lista)	35
German Albums (Offizielle Top 100)	28
Greek Albums (IFPI Greece)	7
Irish Albums (IRMA)	27
Japanese Albums (Oricon)	45
Scottish Albums (OCC) (March 1994 chart inception)	60
Swedish Albums (Sverigetopplistan)	38
UK Albums (Official Charts)	2

=== Year-end charts ===
Chart (1992)	Peak position
UK Albums (OCC)	32
Chart (1993)	Peak position
Europe (Eurochart Hot 100)	62
UK Albums (OCC)	19

== Certifications ==
Region	Certification	Certified units/sales
Germany	—	100,000
United Kingdom (BPI)	2× Platinum	870,000
Summaries
Worldwide	—	1,500,000
