= Do What U Like =

Single by Take That

from the album Take That & Party
- B-side: "Waiting Around"
- Released: 22 July 1991
- Studio: The Mothership (Surrey, England); Battery (London, England)
- Length: 3:06
- Label: Dance UK
- Songwriters: Gary Barlow; Ray Hedges
- Producers: Ray Hedges; Graham Stack

Take That singles chronology
"Do What U Like" (1991)	"Promises" (1991)

Music video
- "Do What U Like" on YouTube

"Do What U Like" is a song English boy band Take That. It was released as their debut single on 22 July 1991, serving as the lead single from their first studio album, Take That & Party (1992).

== Background ==
The song was written by Gary Barlow and Ray Hedges, and it was produced by Hedges with additional production by Graham Stack. "Do What U Like" was released on 22 July 1991 as the lead single from Take That's debut album, Take That & Party (1992). The single was released on then-manager Nigel Martin-Smith's record label Dance UK and distributed by BMG (to which, through RCA Records division, later signed). This was the only single not to be included on the band's second greatest hits compilation, Never Forget – The Ultimate Collection (2005).

== Release ==
Originally released only on 7-inch and 12-inch vinyl records and as cassette single, it received a CD single reissue in 1992, from their at-time home label RCA Records, only in Australia.

== Critical reception ==
In 2012, the Daily Mirror retrospectively commented, "Looking back, it's almost inconceivable that the skinny wannabes cavorting around in the video covered in jelly and custard – including 17-year-old schoolboy Robbie Williams – would go on to become one of the biggest phenomenons in British pop history."

Reaction to the song and video among the bandmates has been somewhat negative. In the documentary Take That: For the Record, Barlow admits that neither the song nor video were brilliant, but they were important in helping the band getting noticed.

== Music video ==
The low-budget music video for "Do What U Like", co-directed by former BBC Radio 1 DJ and The Old Grey Whistle Test presenter Rosemary "Ro" Barratt (née Newton) and MTV Europe director Angie Smith, was shot at Vector Television studios in Heaton Mersey on 21 June 1991. Featuring the band members cavorting with women, smearing jelly over themselves, and baring their buttocks, the video was banned from daytime television; it was, however, shown on Pete Waterman's late night show The Hitman and Her.

== Live performances ==
During the band's early television appearances and outdoor shows, the song was a recurring number to play. They performed it during the "Pops" tour with Mini-Take That, a preteen group that sang the material of the band.

For the "Nobody Else", and the subsequent "Ultimate Tour 2006" and "Beautiful World Tour 2007", the song was never played, because the band members felt that the high energy dance choreography was not possible for them to do. However, during Take That Present: The Circus Live, it was included in a medley of their earliest singles from Take That and Party with Jason and Howard performing the complicated moves and classic routines for "Promises", "It Only Takes a Minute" and "Take That and Party".

== Track listings ==
Australian CD single

1. "Do What U Like" (club mix) – 6:14
2. "Do What U Like" (radio mix) – 3:06
3. "Waiting Around" – 2:56

UK 7-inch vinyl

1. "Do What U Like" (radio mix) – 3:06
2. "Waiting Around" – 2:56

UK cassette

1. "Do What U Like" (radio mix) – 3:06
2. "Waiting Around" – 2:56

UK 12-inch vinyl

1. "Do What U Like" (club mix) – 6:14
2. "Do What U Like" (radio mix) – 3:06
3. "Waiting Around" – 2:56

== Personnel ==
- Gary Barlow – lead vocals
- Howard Donald – backing vocals
- Jason Orange – backing vocals
- Mark Owen – backing vocals
- Robbie Williams – backing vocals

== Charts ==
Chart (1991)	Peak position
UK Singles (OCC)	82
