= Karen Bruce =

British choreographer

- Born: 25 March 1963 (age 62); Billericay, Essex, England

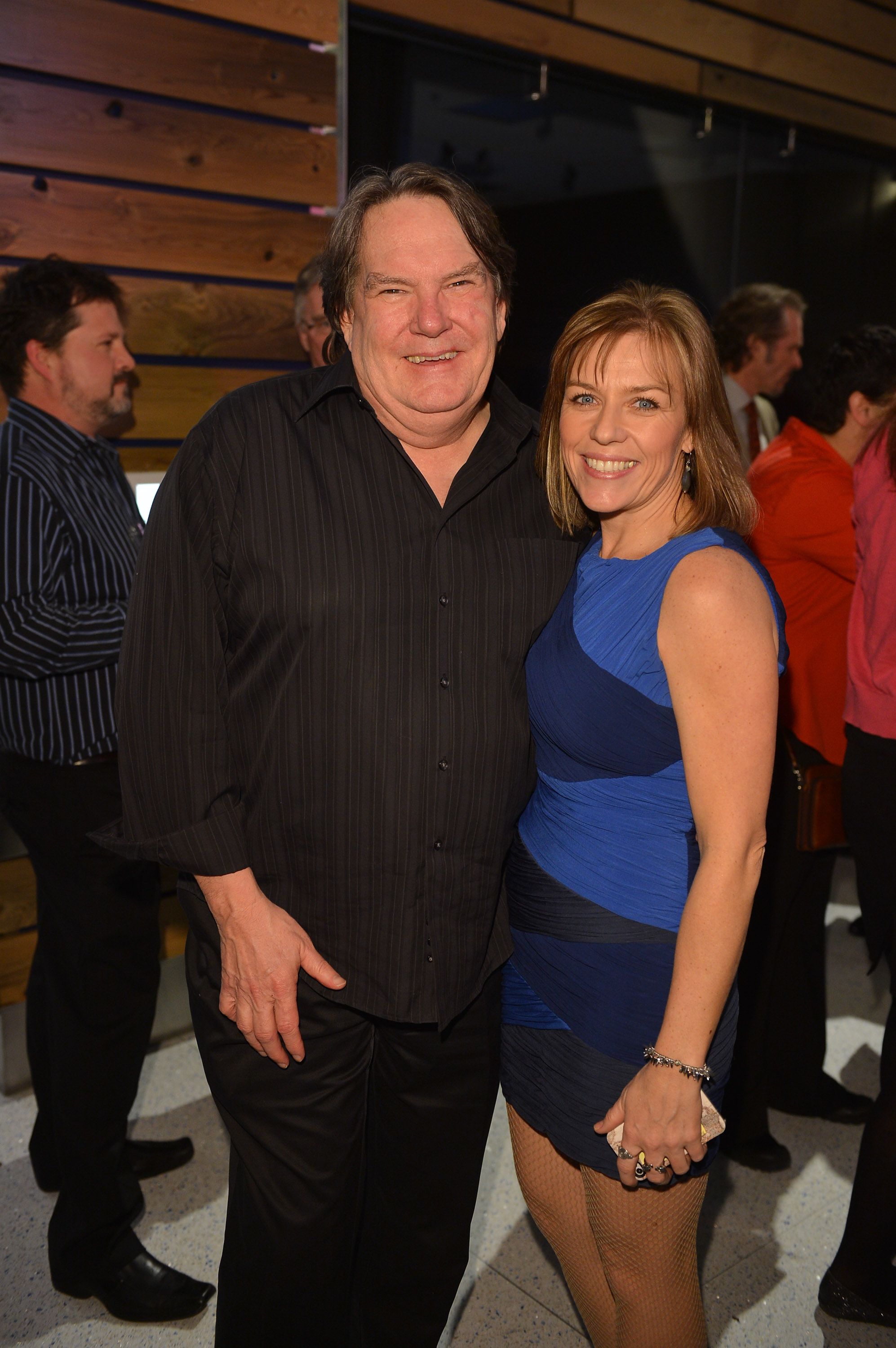
Don Carmody and Karen Bruce at Canadian Screen Awards Nominee Reception

Karen Bruce (born 25 March 1963) is a choreographer and director who has worked in theatre and television.

Bruce's work includes direction and choreography of The Last Tango, Dance 'til Dawn, Midnight Tango and Love Me Tender. She choreographed The Bodyguard (UK, Germany, USA), Ant and Dec's Saturday Night Takeaway, BBC Tumble, Strictly Come Dancing (five seasons beginning in 2011) and on the second series of So You Think You Can Dance for the BBC. Bruce won an Olivier Award for her choreography of Pacific Overtures at the Donmar Warehouse and Best Choreographer at Premios del Teatro Musical for her work on Saturday Night Fever. She choreographed the Take That musical. She directed and choreographed the UK productions of Footloose The Musical and Fame on tour and on the West End.

== Theatre credits ==
Strictly Come Dancing – The Professionals (UK tour); Footloose The Musical (West End/ UK tour/ South Africa); Saturday Night Fever (Associate director/ choreographer, West End/ UK tour/ Australia/ Singapore/ Korea/ South Africa/ Spain); Fame (Shaftesbury Theatre/ UK tour); The Wedding Singer (UK tour) and Oliver! (Bermuda).

== As Choreographer ==
- Starlight Express (Joburg Theatre, South Africa)
- The memorable Strictly Underwater sequence for Sport Relief
- Pacific Overtures (Donmar Warehouse, Olivier Award Best Choreographer)
- Never Forget (Savoy Theatre/ UK tour)
- The Producers (Stage Entertainment, Spain)
- Brighton Rock (Almeida)
- Far Pavilions (West End)
- Annie Get Your Gun (No 1 UK tour)
- Dr Dolittle (UK tour)
- A Chorus Line and Sweet Charity (both Sheffield Crucible with Sweet Charity winning the TMA Best Musical award)
- Chess (Budapest)
- Opening Ceremony at the 2002 Commonwealth Games in Manchester.
- Staging for the United Kingdom entry ('Believe in Me' by Bonnie Tyler) in the Grand Final of the Eurovision Song Contest 2013.
