= I Found Heaven =

1992 single by Take That

Single by Take That

from the album Take That & Party
- B-side: "I'm Out"
- Released: 3 August 1992
- Recorded: Southlands (London, England)
- Genre: Teen pop; dance-pop
- Length: 4:02
- Label: RCA; BMG
- Songwriters: Ian Levine; Billy Griffin
- Producers: Ian Levine; Billy Griffin

Take That singles chronology
"It Only Takes a Minute" (1992)	"I Found Heaven" (1992)	"A Million Love Songs" (1992)

Alternative covers
- UK 7-inch limited edition vinyl

Alternative cover
- Japanese 3-inch CD single cover

Music video
- "I Found Heaven" on YouTube

"I Found Heaven" is a song by English boy band Take That from their debut studio album, Take That & Party. It was released as the album's fifth single on 3 August 1992.

== Background ==
Written and produced by American singer Billy Griffin and English producer Ian Levine, it was released on 3 August 1992 as the fifth single from the band's debut album, Take That & Party (1992). It became the group's second top-20 single, charting at number fifteen on the UK Singles Chart. "I Found Heaven" is the first song by Take That to feature both Gary Barlow and Robbie Williams on lead vocals, and also the only non-cover written by someone else than the band.

In Gary Barlow's autobiography My Take, he states that the band hates the song: "The song Ian made us sing was truly fucking awful. I still hate it to this day. In fact, we all hate it and absolutely refuse to perform it on stage. It is, by a huge margin, the worst song of Take That's and my career. At the time I said nothing because I felt I didn't have a leg to stand on."

Although often considered Robbie Williams' debut song on lead vocals, certain sections of the track were supplemented with vocals by Billy Griffin due to Williams' inability to reach the high notes. Williams reportedly walked out of the session after an argument with Ian Levine regarding the matter. Also Ian Levine claimed that Jason Orange did not sing on the song because he felt that Orange did not have the needed vocal abilities at the time.

During the recording of this song, the group experienced a falling-out with Levine, and requested that they not record or write with him in the future. The single's B-side, "I'm Out," was written about this situation.

== Critical reception ==
Music & Media commented, "These newcomers in the rich British tradition of teeny hoppers—from the Bay City Rollers to Wham! and Bros—try the now popular close harmony pop style. Judging by their current hit status, it is already widely recognized in the UK."

== Music video ==
The music video for the single was filmed on Sandown Beach on the Isle of Wight, and the yellow car featured is owned by a local resident, and is fairly well known amongst the islanders. The band perform the song on the beach whilst clips of the band relaxing on the beach are intercut with the video. In Gary Barlow's autobiography: 'My Take', he expressed that the band were disappointed with the location on which the video was filmed. They apparently hoped for the video to be shot in an exotic continent. The video won Best Video at the 1992 Smash Hits Awards.

== Track listings ==
UK and European CD single (74321 10813 2)
No.	Title	Writer(s)	Producer(s)	Length
1.	"I Found Heaven" (7-inch radio mix)	Ian Levine, Billy Griffin	Levine, Griffin	4:02
2.	"I'm Out"	Gary Barlow	Duncan Bridgeman	4:15
3.	"Promises" (7-inch radio mix)	Graham Stack, Barlow	Pete Hammond	3:34
4.	"I Found Heaven" (classic 12-inch mix)	Levine, Griffin	Levine, Griffin	6:54

UK cassette single (74321 10813 4)
No.	Title	Writer(s)	Producer(s)	Length
1.	"I Found Heaven" (7-inch radio mix)	Ian Levine, Billy Griffin	Levine, Griffin	4:02
2.	"I'm Out"	Gary Barlow	Duncan Bridgeman	4:13

Japanese 3-inch CD single (BVDP-80)
No.	Title	Writer(s)	Producer(s)	Length
1.	"I Found Heaven" (7-inch radio mix)	Ian Levine, Billy Griffin	Levine, Griffin	4:02
2.	"Promises" (7-inch radio mix)	Graham Stack, Gary Barlow	Pete Hammond	3:34

UK limited-edition picture disc 7-inch vinyl (74321 10813 7)
No.	Title	Writer(s)	Producer(s)	Length
1.	"I Found Heaven" (7-inch radio mix)	Ian Levine, Billy Griffin	Levine, Griffin	4:02
2.	"I'm Out"	Gary Barlow	Duncan Bridgeman	4:13

UK limited-edition with poster sleeve 7-inch vinyl (#74321 10814 7)
No.	Title	Writer(s)	Producer(s)	Length
1.	"I Found Heaven" (7-inch radio mix)	Ian Levine, Billy Griffin	Levine, Griffin	4:02
2.	"I Found Heaven" (Mr. F's garage mix)	Levine, Griffin	Levine, Griffin	6:08

UK 12-inch vinyl (74321 11240 1)
No.	Title	Writer(s)	Producer(s)	Length
1.	"I Found Heaven" (Mr. F's garage mix)	Ian Levine, Billy Griffin	Levine, Griffin	6:08
2.	"I Found Heaven" (original 12-inch mix)	Levine, Griffin	Levine, Griffin	6:35
3.	"I Found Heaven" (7-inch radio mix)	Ian Levine, Billy Griffin	Levine, Griffin	4:02

== Personnel ==
- Gary Barlow – co-lead vocals, backing vocals
- Robbie Williams – co-lead vocals, backing vocals
- Howard Donald – backing vocals
- Mark Owen – backing vocals
- Billy Griffin – additional co-lead vocals, backing vocals

== Charts ==
Chart (1992)	Peak position
Europe (Eurochart Hot 100)	38
Germany (Media Control AG)	56
Israel (Israeli Singles Chart)	25
Spain Airplay (Top 40 Radio)	11
UK Singles (OCC)	15
UK Airplay (Music Week)	15

== Release history ==
Region	Date	Format(s)	Label(s)	Ref.
United Kingdom	3 August 1992	7-inch vinyl; CD; cassette	RCA	
Australia	26 October 1992	CD; cassette	RCA	
Japan	21 May 1993	Mini-CD	RCA	
