= Promises (Take That song) =

Single by Take That

from the album Take That & Party
- B-side: "Do What U Like"
- Released: 11 November 1991
- Genre: Dance-pop; synth-pop
- Length: 3:34
- Label: RCA
- Songwriters: Gary Barlow; Graham Stack
- Producer: Pete Hammond

Take That singles chronology
"Do What U Like" (1991)	"Promises" (1991)	"Once You've Tasted Love" (1992)

Music video
- "Promises" on YouTube

"Promises" is a dance-pop song by English boy band Take That. Written by Gary Barlow and Graham Stack, it was released on 11 November 1991 as the second single from the band's debut album, Take That & Party (1992). It was their first released single after signing to RCA Records. The song was a modest success and provided the group with their Top 40 breakthrough, charting at number 38 on the UK Singles Chart.

== Critical reception ==
Alan Jones from Music Week described the track as a "well-performed, hook-laden pop song executed with more panache and credibility than most teen favourites can conjure up. This is definitely one to watch." Simon Williams from NME said, "The synth-mungous likes of 'Once You've Tasted Love' and 'Promises' are amiably crass hi-NRG rompalongs, sort of Kajagoogoo gone Italian House."

== Music video ==
The music video for the song uses intercut clips of the band performing and rehearsing as well as showing the hysteria of Take That's fans. It also shows a half-naked band member, unknown at the time, jumping out of a swimming pool in a thong. Robbie Williams said that person was him during an interview for the 2006 documentary Take That: For the Record. In August 2018 on an Instagram post, Howard Donald revealed that it was he in that shot.

== Track listings ==
- Austrian CD single (PC45085)
1. "Promises" (7-inch radio mix) – 3:33
2. "Promises" (12-inch mix) – 6:50
3. "Do What U Like" – 3:06
- UK 7-inch vinyl (PB45085)
1. "Promises" (7-inch radio mix) – 3:33
2. "Do What U Like" – 3:06
- UK 7-inch vinyl (PB45085P) (Limited Edition w/poster sleeve)
1. "Promises" (7-inch radio mix) – 3:33
2. "Do What U Like" – 3:06
- UK cassette (PK45085)
1. "Promises" (7-inch radio mix) – 3:33
2. "Do What U Like" – 3:06
- UK 12-inch vinyl (PT45086)
1. "Promises" (12-inch mix) – 6:50
2. "Do What U Like" (12-inch mix) – 5:06

== Personnel ==
- Gary Barlow – lead vocals
- Howard Donald – backing vocals
- Jason Orange – backing vocals
- Mark Owen – backing vocals
- Robbie Williams – backing vocals

== Charts ==
Chart (1991)	Peak position
Luxembourg (Radio Luxembourg)	20
UK Singles (OCC)	38
UK Airplay (Music Week)	40
UK Dance (Music Week)	60
