= Graham Stack (music producer) =

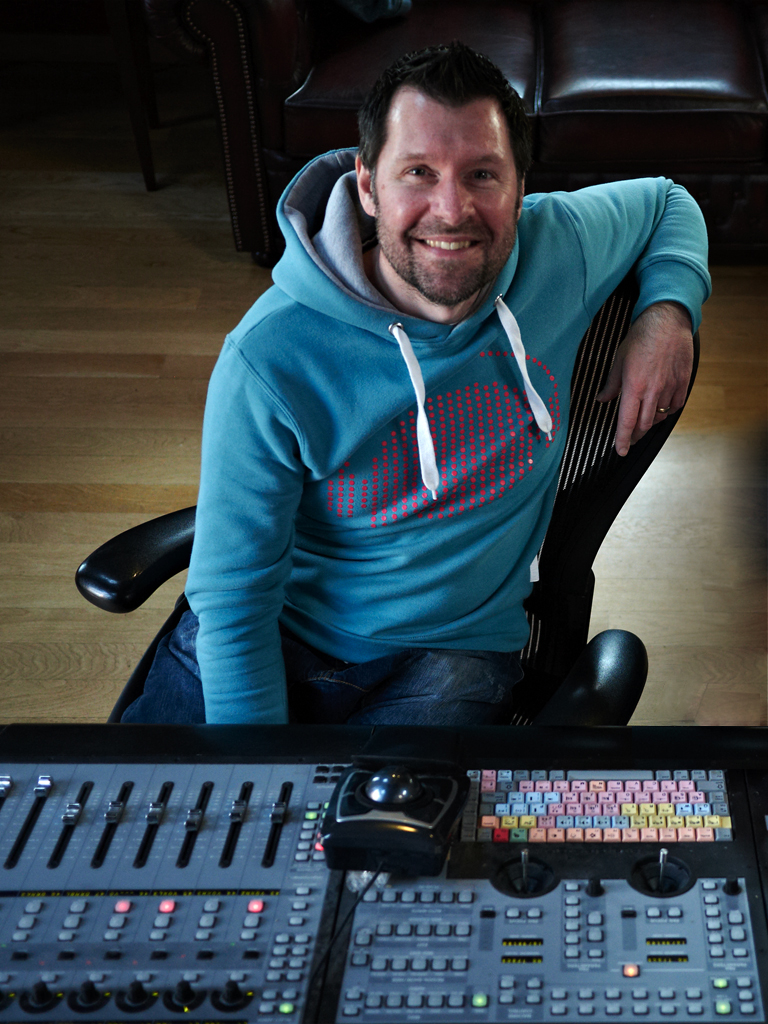
- Stack at the Metrophonic Studio in London

Background information
- Genres: House; dance; techno-pop; dance-pop
- Occupations: Producer; writer; remixer; musical director

Graham Stack is an English record producer and songwriter who has written and produced hit records for many artists including James Arthur, JLS, Kylie Minogue, Take That, LeAnn Rimes, Tina Turner, Girls Aloud, Atomic Kitten, Steps, Westlife, Donna Summer, Rod Stewart, Il Divo and Natalie Cole.

Stack has worked as a music producer and music director on The X Factor UK and The X Factor USA as well as on Britain's Got Talent and America's Got Talent. Stack has also remixed a number of singles including the Latino version of "Can't Fight the Moonlight" for LeAnn Rimes which sold over 1 million copies and was a pan European hit.

== Early career ==
Stack was fascinated by music from an early age and played guitar in a school band with drummer Tim Goldsmith (Go West, Alison Moyet, Joan Armitrading). Stack got his first break when he was signed to Zomba Music Publishing as a writer and Zomba Management as a record producer. He worked with Take That during this period and had access to the Battery studio complex where he learnt from other Zomba producers including Mutt Lange. He was then signed by Brian Rawling to independent publisher Rive Droite scoring hits with Kylie Minogue, Tina Turner, Rod Stewart and Steps before moving to Metrophonic his current home.

== Discography ==
=== As songwriter/producer ===
==== Albums ====
- Westlife "The Love Album" (2 million worldwide sales)
- Tina Turner 24/7 (1 million European sales)
- Steps "Gold Greatest Hits" (1.2 million)
- Steps "Buzz" (600,000)
- Kylie Minogue "Light Years" (1.3 million)
- Charlotte Church "Tissues and Issues"
- G4 "G4" (UK number 1, 800,000)
- G4 "G4 and friends" (400,000)
- G4 "Act Three" ( 300,000)
- Mónica Naranjo "Minage" (Spain number 1, 400,000)
- Girls Aloud "Sound of the Underground"
- Jo O'Meara "Relentless"
- Jai McDowall "Believe"
- LeAnn Rimes "I Need You"
- LeAnn Rimes "Greatest Hits"
- LeAnn Rimes "The Best of LeAnn Rimes: Remixed"
- Take That "Take That and Party"
- Take That "Greatest Hits"
- Take That "Never Forget, The Ultimate Collection"
- Rod Stewart "Human"
- John Barrowman "Another Side"
- Lee Mead "Lee Mead"
- A1 "The A List"
- A1 "Same Old Brand New You"
- Worlds Apart "Don't Change"
- Dannii Minogue "Girl"
- Rene Froger "I Don't Break Easy"
- Pandora "No regrets"
- Mulan II (soundtrack)
- Alliage "Musics"
- C4 "En Plein Coeur"
- Anna Vissi "Everything I Am"
- Jonathan and Charlotte "Together" (certified Gold)

==== Singles ====
- James Arthur "Impossible" (UK number 1, fastest selling X Factor single)
- Kylie Minogue "On A Night Like This" (UK number 2, Australian number 1)
- Tina Turner "When The Heartache Is Over" (UK and European top 10)
- Rene Froger "Crazy way about you" (Holland number 3 and Belgium top 10)
- Rene Froger "I can't stop myself"
- Rene Froger "Somebody elses dream"
- Rene Froger "The best of my love" (released in Belgium only)
- LeAnn Rimes "Can't Fight the Moonlight" (Radio remix and single version. Over 1 million sales)
- Liz McClarnon "Woman in Love" (UK number 3)
- Take That "Promises" (UK top 40)
- Steps "Chain Reaction" (UK number 2)
- Freemasons Featuring Amanda Wilson "Love on My Mind"
- A1 "Take on Me" (UK and Norway number 1)
- Atomic Kitten "The Tide Is High" (remix)
- H & Claire "DJ" (UK number 3)
- Natalie Cole "Livin' For Love" (Billboard Dance chart number 1)
- Lee Mead "Gonna Make You A Star"
- Lee Mead "You And Me"
- Dead or Alive "You Spin Me Round (Like A Record)" (2006 version)
- Darius "Live Twice" (UK number 8)
- David Sneddon "Baby Get Higher"
- Worlds Apart "Back To Where We Started"
- All Stars "Back When"
- Mónica Naranjo "If You Leave Me Now" (Spain number 1)
- Mónica Naranjo "Enamorada" (Spain number 2)
- Vanvelzen "Baby Get Higher"
- Steel Pulse "Brown Eyed Girl"

=== Remixes ===
- Atomic Kitten – Be With You
- Aqua "Around The World"
- Aqua "Cartoon Heroes"
- Delta Goodrem "Born To Try"
- Delta Goodrem "Bare Hands"
- Chaka Khan "Get My Party On"
- Ronan Keating "If Tomorrow Never Comes"
- Shaggy "Strength of a Woman"
- Shaggy "Get My Party On"
- LeAnn Rimes "Soon"
- LeAnn Rimes "I Need You"
- LeAnn Rimes "Can't Fight the Moonlight"
- LeAnn Rimes "The Right Kind of Wrong"
- Geri Halliwell "Calling"
- Mónica Naranjo "Sobreviviré"
- Michael Bolton "Dance With Me"
- Darius "Girl in the Moon"
- Take That "Do What You Like"
- Sarah Brightman "Beautiful Day"
- Tina Arena "Symphony of Life"
- Miguel Bosé "Bandido"
- David Charvet "Leap of Faith"
