= Once You've Tasted Love =

1992 single by Take That

Single by Take That

from the album Take That & Party
- B-side: "Guess Who Tasted Love"
- Released: 27 January 1992
- Genre: Pop; dance; hi-NRG
- Length: 3:33
- Label: RCA
- Songwriter: Gary Barlow
- Producer: Duncan Bridgeman

Take That singles chronology
"Promises" (1991)	"Once You've Tasted Love" (1992)	"It Only Takes a Minute" (1992)

Alternative cover
- UK limited-edition 7-inch vinyl

Alternative cover
- UK limited-edition 12-inch vinyl

Music video
- "Once You've Tasted Love" on YouTube

"Once You've Tasted Love" is a song by British boy band Take That. Written by Gary Barlow and produced by Duncan Bridgeman, "Once You've Tasted Love" was released on 27 January 1992 as the third single from the band's debut album, Take That & Party (1992). It peaked at number 47 on the UK Singles Chart.

== Critical reception ==
Music Week wrote, "Irrespressibly bouncy with a sheen borrowed from PWL, it's actually a fairly decent song, but it tries a little too hard to steer a middle course between being a pop record and being a dance record, so could fail to realise its full potential. A tighter mix, geared in either direction, could do the trick." Simon Williams from NME said, "The synth-mungous likes of 'Once You've Tasted Love' and 'Promises' are amiably crass hi-NRG rompalongs, sort of Kajagoogoo gone Italian House."

== Music video ==
The music video for the song was shot on a low budget in a warehouse. The band is shown performing the song against a white backdrop.

== Track listings ==
Austrian CD single (PC45257)

1. "Once You've Tasted Love" (Aural Mix) – 8:12
2. "Guess Who Tasted Love" (Guess Who Mix) – 5:25
3. "Once You've Tasted Love" (Radio Version) – 3:33

UK 7-inch vinyl (PB45257)

1. "Once You've Tasted Love" – 3:43
2. "Guess Who Tasted Love" – 5:25

UK 7-inch vinyl (PB45265) (Limited Edition w/ desktop pop-up 1992 calendar)

1. "Once You've Tasted Love" – 3:43
2. "Guess Who Tasted Love" – 5:25

UK 12-inch vinyl (PT45258)(Limited Edition picture disc)

1. "Once You've Tasted Love" (Aural Mix) – 8:12
2. "Guess Who Tasted Love" (Guess Who Mix) – 5:25
3. "Once You've Tasted Love" (Radio Version) – 3:33

UK cassette (PK45257)

1. "Once You've Tasted Love" – 3:43
2. "Guess Who Tasted Love" – 5:25

== Personnel ==
- Gary Barlow – lead vocals
- Howard Donald – backing vocals
- Jason Orange – backing vocals
- Mark Owen – backing vocals
- Robbie Williams – backing vocals

== Charts ==
Chart (1992)	Peak position
Australia (ARIA)	188
UK Singles (OCC)	47

== Release history ==
Region	Date	Format(s)	Label(s)	Ref.
United Kingdom	27 January 1992	7-inch vinyl; 12-inch picture disc; CD	RCA	
United Kingdom	3 February 1992	7-inch vinyl with calendar	RCA	
Australia	2 March 1992	12-inch vinyl; CD; cassette	RCA	
