= It Only Takes a Minute =

1975 single by Tavares

Single by Tavares

from the album In the City
- B-side: "I Hope She Chooses Me"
- Released: July 1975
- Genre: Soul; R&B; disco
- Length: 4:00 (album version); 3:13 (single version)
- Label: Capitol
- Songwriters: Dennis Lambert; Brian Potter
- Producers: Dennis Lambert; Brian Potter

Tavares singles chronology
"Remember What I Told You to Forget" (1975)	"It Only Takes a Minute" (1975)	"Free Ride" (1975)

Alternative release(s)
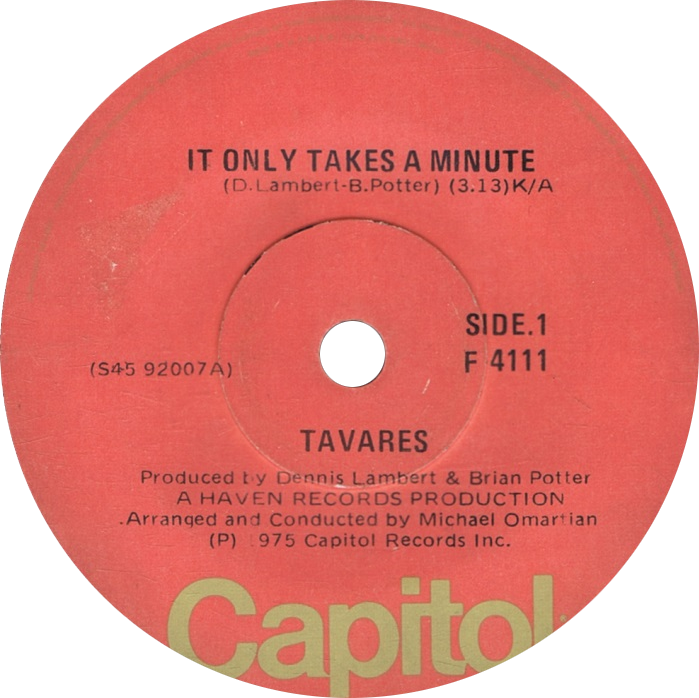
- Side A of New Zealand single

"It Only Takes a Minute" is a 1975 song by American soul/R&B group Tavares, released as the first single from their third album, In the City (1975). The song was the group's only top-10 pop hit in the United States, peaking at number 10, and their second number one song on the American soul charts. On the US Disco chart, "It Only Takes a Minute" spent five weeks at number two and was the first of four entries on the chart. The song was subsequently covered by Jonathan King performing as 100 Ton and a Feather in 1976 and by boy band Take That in 1992.

A remastered version of the Tavares' original is featured in the soundtrack of Konami's dancing game Dance Dance Revolution 3rd Mix released in 1999. While a later remix from European producer X-Treme was also featured in DDRMAX2: Dance Dance Revolution 7th MIX released in 2002.

== Charts ==
Tavares' original version did not chart in the UK until 1986, when it could only reach No 46 in the UK Singles Chart. It was the last of their ten hits in the UK.

Jonathan King's version peaked at number nine for two weeks in July 1976, and number 10 in Ireland. It would prove to be the last of his six top-10 UK singles in a career that started in 1965 with "Everyone's Gone to the Moon".

=== Weekly charts ===
Tavares version

Chart (1975)	Peak position
Canada	17
US Billboard Hot 100	10
US Hot Dance Club Play (Billboard)	2
US Hot Soul Singles (Billboard)	1
US Cash Box Top 100	10

Chart (1986)	Peak position
UK Singles (OCC)	46

One Hundred Ton and a Feather/Jonathan King version

Chart (1976)	Peak position
Ireland (IRMA)	10
UK Singles (OCC)	9

=== Year-end charts ===
Chart (1975)	Rank
Canada	114
US Billboard Hot 100	86
US Cash Box Top 100	70

== Take That version ==
"It Only Takes a Minute"

Single by Take That

from the album Take That & Party
- B-side: "I Can Make It"; "Never Want to Let You Go"; "Satisfied"
- Released: May 25, 1992
- Genre: Dance-pop; house
- Length: 3:46 (album version); 3:50 (7-inch version)
- Label: RCA
- Songwriters: Dennis Lambert; Brian Potter
- Producer: Nigel Wright

Take That singles chronology
"Once You've Tasted Love" (1992)	"It Only Takes a Minute" (1992)	"I Found Heaven" (1992)

Music video
- "It Only Takes a Minute" on YouTube

English boyband Take That recorded a cover of "It Only Takes a Minute" and released it as a single on May 25, 1992, by RCA Records, as the fourth single from the band's debut album, Take That & Party (1992). It was produced by Nigel Wright and became the band's first top-10 single, charting at number seven on the UK Singles Chart. The song was performed in conjunction with "Do What U Like" in the Take That Hometown Tour which featured Mini Take That. Robbie Williams has a solo section in the last chorus, although he is uncredited.

"It Only Takes a Minute" was the group's first single released in Canada in February 1993. The song was one of three by Take That nominated for British Single at the Brit Awards in 1993 but lost to their version of "Could It Be Magic". In the UK, the song has sold 146,000 copies as of March 2017.

=== Critical reception ===
Larry Flick from Billboard magazine declared Take That's version of the song as a "light and fluffy rendition of the Tavares disco nugget." He noted further, "Layers of warm harmonies are complemented by reedy horns and an easy-going dance beat. A sugary treat..." Melody Maker felt that "they do for house what their American counterparts [ NKOTB ] did for hip hop." Dave Piccioni from Music Week's RM Dance Update complimented the "very handy" Tommy Musto remix of the song as "a useful DJ tool that's flying out of the shops." Simon Williams from NME wrote, "'It Only Takes A Minute' took Take That's cunning annexation of the gay club scene into the realm of the anthemic, not to mention hysterical with the line, If you get a 'flu attack/For 30 days you're on your back!." Tom Doyle from Smash Hits gave it three out of five, noting that "this sounds exactly like The Village People". He also named it "one of the That's best tunes". A writer for Sunday World stated that this "should be the song which finally breaks Take That".

=== Music video ===
A music video was produced to promote the single. It involves the band singing and performing the song at a boxing ring with members Howard Donald, Jason Orange and Mark Owen breakdancing whilst Robbie Williams and Gary Barlow chase after a girl.

=== Track listings ===
- UK CD single (74321 10100 2)
1. "It Only Takes a Minute" (7-inch version) – 3:50
2. "I Can Make It" – 4:12
3. "Never Want to Let You Go" – 4:28
4. "It Only Takes a Minute" (Deep Club Mix) – 5:43
- UK 7-inch vinyl (74321 10100 7)
1. "It Only Takes a Minute" (7-inch version) – 3:50
2. "Satisfied" – 4:32
- UK 7-inch vinyl (Limited Edition) (74321 10101 7)
1. "It Only Takes a Minute" (7-inch version) – 3:50
2. "It Only Takes a Minute" (Royal Rave Mix) – 4:46
- UK 12-inch vinyl (74321 10102 7)
1. "It Only Takes a Minute" (Deep Club Mix) – 5:43
2. "It Only Takes a Minute" (Wright Vocal Mix) – 6:14
3. "It Only Takes a Minute" (Dem Drums) – 5:19
4. "It Only Takes a Minute" (Blondapella) – 2:16
5. "It Only Takes a Minute" (Love Dub) – 7:11
- UK cassette (74321 10100 4)
1. "It Only Takes a Minute" (7-inch version) – 3:50
2. "Satisfied" – 4:32
- European CD single (74321 11100 5)
1. "It Only Takes a Minute" (7-inch version) – 3:50
2. "I Can Make It" – 4:12
3. "It Only Takes a Minute" (Wright Vocal Mix) – 6:14
4. "It Only Takes a Minute" (Deep Club Mix) – 5:43
- US CD single (TAKE4)
1. "It Only Takes a Minute" (7-inch version) – 3:50
2. "It Only Takes a Minute" (new remix - radio version) – 3:25
- US 7-inch vinyl (TAKE14)
1. "It Only Takes a Minute" (7-inch version) – 3:50
2. "It Only Takes a Minute" (new remix - radio version) – 3:25
- US 12-inch vinyl (TAKE214)
1. "It Only Takes a Minute" (club version) – 5:43
2. "It Only Takes a Minute" (dub version) – 6:14
3. "It Only Takes a Minute" (new remix - radio version) – 3:25
4. "It Only Takes a Minute" (Underground Vocal) – 6:33
5. "It Only Takes a Minute" (Underground Instrumental) – 6:33
- Japanese 3-inch CD single (TAKEJAP4)
1. "It Only Takes a Minute" (7-inch version) – 3:50
2. "It Only Takes a Minute" (Wright Vocal Mix) – 6:14

=== Personnel ===
- Gary Barlow – lead vocals
- Howard Donald – backing vocals
- Jason Orange – backing vocals
- Mark Owen – backing vocals
- Robbie Williams – backing vocals

=== Charts ===
==== Weekly charts ====
Chart (1992–1994)	Peak position
Australia (ARIA)	191
Canada Retail Singles (The Record)	20
Estonia (Eesti Top 20)	8
Europe (Eurochart Hot 100)	25
France Airplay (SNEP)	91
Greece (IFPI Greece)	9
Ireland (IRMA)	11
Israel (Israeli Singles Chart)	6
Japan (Oricon)	53
UK Singles (Official Charts)	7
UK Airplay (Music Week)	3

==== Year-end charts ====
Chart (1992)	Position
UK Singles (OCC)	76
UK Airplay (Music Week)	60

=== Release history ===
Region	Date	Format(s)	Label(s)	Ref.
United Kingdom	May 25, 1992	7-inch vinyl; CD; cassette	RCA	
Australia	July 13, 1992	CD; cassette	RCA	
Japan	February 24, 1993	Mini-CD	RCA	
