= A Million Love Songs =

1992 single by Take That

Single by Take That

from the album Take That & Party
- Released: 28 September 1992
- Genre: Pop
- Length: 3:52
- Label: Sony Music
- Songwriter: Gary Barlow
- Producers: Billy Griffin; Ian Levine

Take That singles chronology
"I Found Heaven" (1992)	"A Million Love Songs" (1992)	"Could It Be Magic" (1992)

Music video
- "A Million Love Songs" on YouTube

"A Million Love Songs" is a song by English boy band Take That which appeared on their debut studio album, Take That & Party (1992). The song was written by lead vocalist Gary Barlow. It was released in the United Kingdom on 28 September 1992 by Sony Music and peaked at number seven on the UK Singles Chart that October. It also reached number 50 in the Netherlands.

The song was one of three by Take That nominated for British Single at the Brit Awards in 1993 but lost to their version of "Could It Be Magic". "A Million Love Songs" won Best Single at the 1992 Smash Hits Awards.

== Song information ==
Written by lead vocalist Gary Barlow at the age of 15, it was released as the sixth single from the band's debut studio album, Take That & Party, peaking at number seven in the UK Singles Chart. The two primary instruments are piano, played by Barlow, with a saxophone in the bridges originally scored, performed and recorded by Snake Davis. Take That's longtime saxophonist and music director, Mike Stevens went on to perform these sax parts live, many of them using the extended saxophone part written by Davis, at the end of the song.

The song was performed in the final of The X Factor's third series in 2006 by eventual winner Leona Lewis, who was joined on stage halfway through the song by all four members of Take That. It was also performed in the second series of The X Factor by eventual winner Shayne Ward and by JLS on the fifth series of X Factor and in sixth series by Lloyd Daniels. Ward's version was released as a B-side to his single "No Promises". The song was also covered by Alexander O'Neal on his 2008 album, Alex Loves.... On the ninth series of The X Factor, the song was performed by eventual winner James Arthur at the bootcamp, playing an uptempo rendition on acoustic guitar.

== Critical reception ==
Larry Flick from Billboard magazine wrote, "The boys drip with toothy sincerity. Fluttering harp fills are a bit too much for weak stomachs, while the sax lines give the song a '50s retro pop tone that makes you think of sockhops and make-out point. Too bad it's not prom season." British magazine Music Week commented, "Take That change tack with the ballad 'A Million Love Songs', all Philadelphia creamy harmonies and poignant phrasing, that's bound to cause another stampede among the teenies. A nagging sax that is given free reign [sic] to roam is a minor annoyance, but that won't stop this from renewing the group's acquaintance with the Top 20." Simon Williams from NME called it "weepsome", stating the song is "impeccably manufactured", and "one of the few times Take That sound remotely genuine". Craig English of The Music described it as "the old formula of bare-hearted balladry swooning".

== Music video ==
The music video for the song is shot in black and white, and makes use of the "watercolour" video editing effect which effectively blurs the image. The video is simple and shows the band performing the song with Barlow at the piano. Two versions of the video exist; one has the watercolour effect fading in and out and the other features a hand-drawn cartoon storyline with the members of the band trying to woo an emperor's daughter.

== Track listings ==
- UK and European CD and 7-inch EP
1. "A Million Love Songs" (7-inch edit) – 3:53
2. "Still Can't Get Over You" – 4:10
3. "How Can It Be" – 4:57
4. "Don't Take Your Love" – 4:04
- UK 7-inch and cassette single; European 7-inch single; Japanese mini-CD single
1. "A Million Love Songs" (7-inch edit)
2. "A Million Love Songs" (Lovers mix)
- Japanese maxi-CD single
1. "A Million Love Songs" (live version)
2. "Satisfied" (live version)
3. "Take That Medley" (live version)
4. "Why Can't I Wake Up with You" (radio edit)
5. "A Million Love Songs" (Lovers mix)

== Personnel ==
- Gary Barlow – lead vocals
- Howard Donald – backing vocals
- Jason Orange – backing vocals
- Mark Owen – backing vocals
- Robbie Williams – backing vocals

== Charts ==
=== Weekly charts ===
Chart (1992–1994)	Peak position
Europe (Eurochart Hot 100)	34
Europe (European AC Radio)	21
Greece (IFPI Greece)	7
Israel (Israeli Singles Chart)	36
Netherlands (Dutch Top 40 Tipparade)	12
Netherlands (Single Top 100)	50
UK Singles (Official Charts)	7
UK Airplay (Music Week)	3

Chart (2006)	Peak position
UK Singles Downloads (Official Charts)	62

Chart (2014)	Peak position
UK Singles (OCC)	84

=== Year-end charts ===
Chart (1992)	Position
UK Singles (OCC)	69
UK Airplay (Music Week)	56

== Certifications ==
Region	Certification	Certified units/sales
United Kingdom (BPI)	Gold	400,000^{‡}
^{‡} Sales+streaming figures based on certification alone.

== Release history ==
Region	Date	Format(s)	Label(s)	Ref(s).
United Kingdom	28 September 1992	7-inch vinyl; CD; cassette	RCA	
Japan	21 July 1993	Mini-CD; maxi-CD	RCA	
