= Nigel Martin-Smith =

British band manager

- Origin: Manchester, England
- Occupation: Band manager
- Website: www.nigelmartin-smith.com

Nigel Martin-Smith is a Manchester-based English musical band manager known primarily for his work with Take That who became a phenomenon but also Lulu, Kavana, Adam Rickitt and Damian.

== Biography ==
=== Early career ===
Martin-Smith entered the entertainment industry in the early 1980s working as a casting agent from offices in Manchester's Royal Exchange. From there, he challenged the "London-centric" attitude of many in the business, championing the cause of local talent and establishing many actors in film and television. His first success in the music industry was the artist Damian who had a UK top 10 hit with a cover of "The Time Warp" in 1989. He also ran the Film Artist Agency at Half Moon Chambers in Manchester.

=== Take That ===
In 1989, Martin-Smith sought to create a British male vocal singing group, a campaign to audition men who could sing and dance, led to auditions in Manchester, where Gary Barlow, Howard Donald, Jason Orange, Mark Owen and Robbie Williams were selected to form the group ‘Kick-It’ who then changed their name to Take That.

Take That sold 19 million records (9 million albums and 10 million singles) between 1990 and 1996. Between the band's first single release in 1991 and their break-up in 1996, the BBC described Take That as "the most successful British band since The Beatles in the UK, beloved of young and old alike". Take That's dance-oriented pop tunes and ballads dominated the UK charts in the first half of the 1990s, spawning two of the best selling albums of the decade with Everything Changes in 1993 and their Greatest Hits in 1996.

In 1995, Williams left the band. After his departure, the third Take That album Nobody Else was re-issued in some markets excluding some vocals by Williams, most notably a new recording of "Love Ain't Here Anymore". The rest of the band finally split in February 1996.

In 1995, Gay Times listed Martin-Smith as one of the most influential gay people in music.

In 2007, Martin-Smith was parodied (along with the members of Take That) in the Channel 4 spoof documentary series Star Stories.

=== Robbie Williams ===
Robbie Williams left Take That in 1995 under a strict performance and confidentiality agreement. In 1997, Martin-Smith sued Williams for unpaid commission in relation to a Take That management contract. Williams responded by saying that Martin-Smith had been in breach of his fiduciary duties as the group's manager. The court found in Martin-Smith's favour and determined that Williams had indeed violated the terms of the contract. Williams appealed against the decision but lost again.

On Williams' 2006 album Rudebox, Williams originally detailed in the track "The 90s" about how he fantasised about gouging out Martin-Smith's eyes during his time with Take That. The lyrics prompted Martin-Smith to instigate legal action against Williams and EMI prior to the album's release. EMI instructed Williams to rewrite the song and remove the offending lyrics. However, since promotional copies of the album had already been dispatched to the media and the lyrics had been made public knowledge, Martin-Smith proceeded with his lawsuit against Williams and EMI and won £300,000 in the High Court for defamation of character. Williams and EMI were also forced to issue a public apology to Martin-Smith.

=== After Take That ===
Martin-Smith entered into a consultancy deal with Virgin Records and managed the comeback of Scottish singer Lulu. Around this time, Martin-Smith made a huge investment in his Manchester-based talent agencies moving into purpose-built studios and offices and employing leading agents to oversee his roster of artistes. The NMSM Talent Group now incorporates:

- Urban Talent: an agency specialising professional actors with a natural talent to work in television. Two of its clients are actors Gerrard Thompson from In the Flesh and James Bryhan from The Apostate.
- Lime actors – a management company for professional, trained actors. One of its clients was former Coronation Street actor Adam Rickitt, signed in 1997.

Nemesis Agency (of which Martin-Smith was the sole director) was sold in a pre-pack deal after entering administration in June 2013.

In 2005, Martin-Smith was contracted to work on the re-launch of Take That which saw him co-produce a TV documentary about the group, manage the release of their Ultimate Collection compilation album, and launch their sell-out UK tour. However, Martin-Smith was removed from the position once the documentary was over and just before the tour as, according to Mark Owen, he "wasn't needed." Martin-Smith later said: “I can’t believe what a success the comeback has been. I thought they would do the tour and that would be it. But now they could tour every year and pack stadiums.”

=== The Mend ===
In 2008 Martin-Smith formed a new vocal group after auditioning boys from the North West. The initial line up consisted of Lewis Conroy, Dean Kelly, Jayme Kontzle and Craig Worsley. The band was initially called ASBRO, a play on words related to an ASBO (Anti Social Behaviour Order), and were described by Danny McFadden in The Guardian as the new East 17.

Martin-Smith stated in an interview that, in seeking members for the band, he, "wanted them to be ‘streetwise’ as well as having bags of personality, a good voice and looking good in front of a camera."

In early 2010, Martin-Smith auditioned for a fifth member, which resulted in the addition of Kris Evans to the group. At this point Lewis Conroy left the line up and the group became a four piece consisting of Evans, Kelly, Kontzle and Worsley.

In 2011, due to the negative associations linked to the name ASBRO, the group became known as The Mend. Of the change, Dean Kelly stated in an interview, 'We loved the name Asbro, but we felt it was holding us back because there was negative feedback about it. We thought ‘we need to mend this’, hence how we came up with The Mend.' Jayme Kontzle added of the name change, "No record label has seen us as The Mend so it’s like a new start for us. It also stands for The Manchester End."

They stated during their first appearance on Britain's Got Talent in early 2012 that they had been together for three years.

== Manchester Gay village ==
In 2000 Martin-Smith opened the first of his commercial entertainment venues in Manchester's gay village, a nightclub called Essential. He then opened a second venue in 2004 called "Queer" — a cafe bar by day and a bar/club by night on Canal Street and finally "Boyz" — an underground pop bar club also on Canal Street, all of which have since closed down.

== Bibliography ==
- Heath, Chris – Feel: Robbie Williams Ebury Press, Pub: 30 September 2004, ISBN 0-09-189753-X
