= The Ultimate Tour (Take That) =

2006 reunion tour by Take That

- Tour by Take That
- Location: Ireland; United Kingdom
- Associated album: Never Forget – The Ultimate Collection
- Start date: 23 April 2006
- End date: 28 June 2006
- Legs: 1
- No. of shows: 33
- Box office: US $29.4 million ($46.95 in 2025 dollars)

Take That concert chronology
- Nobody Else Tour (1995); The Ultimate Tour (2006); Beautiful World Tour 2007 (2007)

The Ultimate Tour was a reunion concert tour in 2006 by the English pop group, Take That. The tour, featuring four of the original members of the group: Gary Barlow, Howard Donald, Jason Orange and Mark Owen, ran for a total of 33 shows. Beverley Knight and Sugababes were the supporting acts for the tour. Each member of the band received £1,500,000 from the tour after tax.

== History ==
The Ultimate Tour was the first time that Take That had performed together since they split in 1996. The show featured all the original members of the group, except Robbie Williams who quit the group in 1995. At a press conference in London on 25 November 2005 the group front man Gary Barlow announced: "Thanks for giving us the last 10 years off but unfortunately the rumours are true. Take That are going back on tour." The news came after renewed interest in the group following a televised documentary proved to be a ratings success and their album Never Forget – The Ultimate Collection peaked at #2 in the UK Albums Chart. The tour was originally scheduled to be an 11 date arena tour but after they sold out within 30 minutes of going on sale, more dates were immediately added as promoters doubled the number of shows. The group sold 275,000 tickets in the space of under 3 hours, ironically making it the second fastest tour of 2005 behind former member Robbie Williams' solo tour. Such was the level of interest in the tour, promoters were forced to add further dates to the tour, this time in Stadium venues. Dates at the new Wembley Stadium in London, Etihad Stadium in Manchester and the Principality Stadium in Cardiff were all announced. When Wembley Stadium sold out in just 30 minutes, further more dates at Wembley and Manchester were announced. In March 2006, the dates at Wembley Stadium were rescheduled to the National Bowl in Milton Keynes due to the delay in the construction of Wembley Stadium.

== Supporting acts ==
The main support act for The Ultimate Tour was English soul singer, Beverley Knight. Knight was originally scheduled to perform only on the arena dates of the tour, but proved so popular with audiences that she was invited to play the stadium shows as well. As well as playing her own set, Knight provided backing vocals for Take That during "Once You've Tasted Love" and gave a spoken introduction to "Relight My Fire", as well as singing Lulu's vocals from the same song at the arena shows. At the stadium dates, Lulu performed her own vocals for "Relight My Fire" and Knight only performed the introduction. Knight also appeared during the finale song, "Never Forget". The other support act for the five British stadium dates at the end of the tour was British girl group Sugababes, and the singer Lulu made a guest appearance during Take That's show to sing her part on "Relight My Fire". The Pussycat Dolls supported the band upon their return to Ireland and the last date of the tour.

== Tour dates ==
Date	City	Country	Venue
23 April 2006	Newcastle	England	Metro Radio Arena
24 April 2006	Newcastle	England	Metro Radio Arena
26 April 2006	Birmingham	England	National Exhibition Centre
27 April 2006	Birmingham	England	National Exhibition Centre
28 April 2006	Birmingham	England	National Exhibition Centre
30 April 2006	Glasgow	Scotland	Scottish Exhibition and Conference Centre
1 May 2006	Glasgow	Scotland	Scottish Exhibition and Conference Centre
2 May 2006	Sheffield	England	Hallam FM Arena
4 May 2006	Manchester	England	Manchester Evening News Arena
5 May 2006	Manchester	England	Manchester Evening News Arena
6 May 2006	Manchester	England	Manchester Evening News Arena
8 May 2006	London	England	Wembley Arena
9 May 2006	London	England	Wembley Arena
10 May 2006	London	England	Wembley Arena
12 May 2006	Dublin	Ireland	Point Theatre
13 May 2006	Dublin	Ireland	Point Theatre
14 May 2006	Belfast	Northern Ireland	Odyssey Arena
16 May 2006	Birmingham	England	National Exhibition Centre
17 May 2006	Birmingham	England	National Exhibition Centre
18 May 2006	Sheffield	England	Hallam FM Arena
20 May 2006	Manchester	England	Manchester Evening News Arena
21 May 2006	Manchester	England	Manchester Evening News Arena
22 May 2006	Manchester	England	Manchester Evening News Arena
24 May 2006	London	England	Wembley Arena
25 May 2006	London	England	Wembley Arena
26 May 2006	London	England	Wembley Arena
17 June 2006	Manchester	England	Etihad Stadium
18 June 2006	Manchester	England	Etihad Stadium
21 June 2006	Cardiff	Wales	Principality Stadium
23 June 2006	Milton Keynes	England	National Bowl
24 June 2006	Milton Keynes	England	National Bowl
25 June 2006	Milton Keynes	England	National Bowl
28 June 2006	Dublin	Ireland	RDS Arena

=== Box office score data ===
Venue	City	Tickets Sold / Available	Gross Revenue
Metro Radio Arena	Newcastle	19,087 / 19,087 (100%)	$1,215,514
National Exhibition Centre	Birmingham	57,007 / 57,007 (100%)	$3,640,386
Scottish Exhibition and Conference Centre	Glasgow	17,385 / 17,385 (100%)	$1,125,259
Hallam FM Arena	Sheffield	22,933 / 22,933 (100%)	$735,654
Evening News Arena	Manchester	85,823 / 85,823 (100%)	$5,421,153
Wembley Arena	London	66,276 / 66,276 (100%)	$4,186,671
Etihad Stadium	Manchester	112,292 / 112,292 (100%)	$7,493,888
Millennium Stadium	Cardiff	55,675 / 55,675 (100%)	$3,710,832
RDS Arena	Dublin	27,526 / 30,000 (92%)	$1,919,916
TOTAL		464,004 / 466,478 (99%)	$29,449,273

== DVD release ==
The concerts on 17 and 18 June at the Etihad Stadium in Manchester were recorded for a subsequent DVD HD DVD and Blu-ray releases, special limited-edition package also contains a live CD with five songs from the show. An edited version of the show was broadcast on British channel ITV2 during Christmas time that year.

== Critical response ==
The tour garnered generally favourable reviews. In his review of the Manchester leg, Chris Long of the BBC wrote that the tour was the "biggest thing to hit Manchester in recent years" and called it "a flawless performance".
