= Impact of the Eras Tour =

Cultural influence of Taylor Swift's sixth concert tour

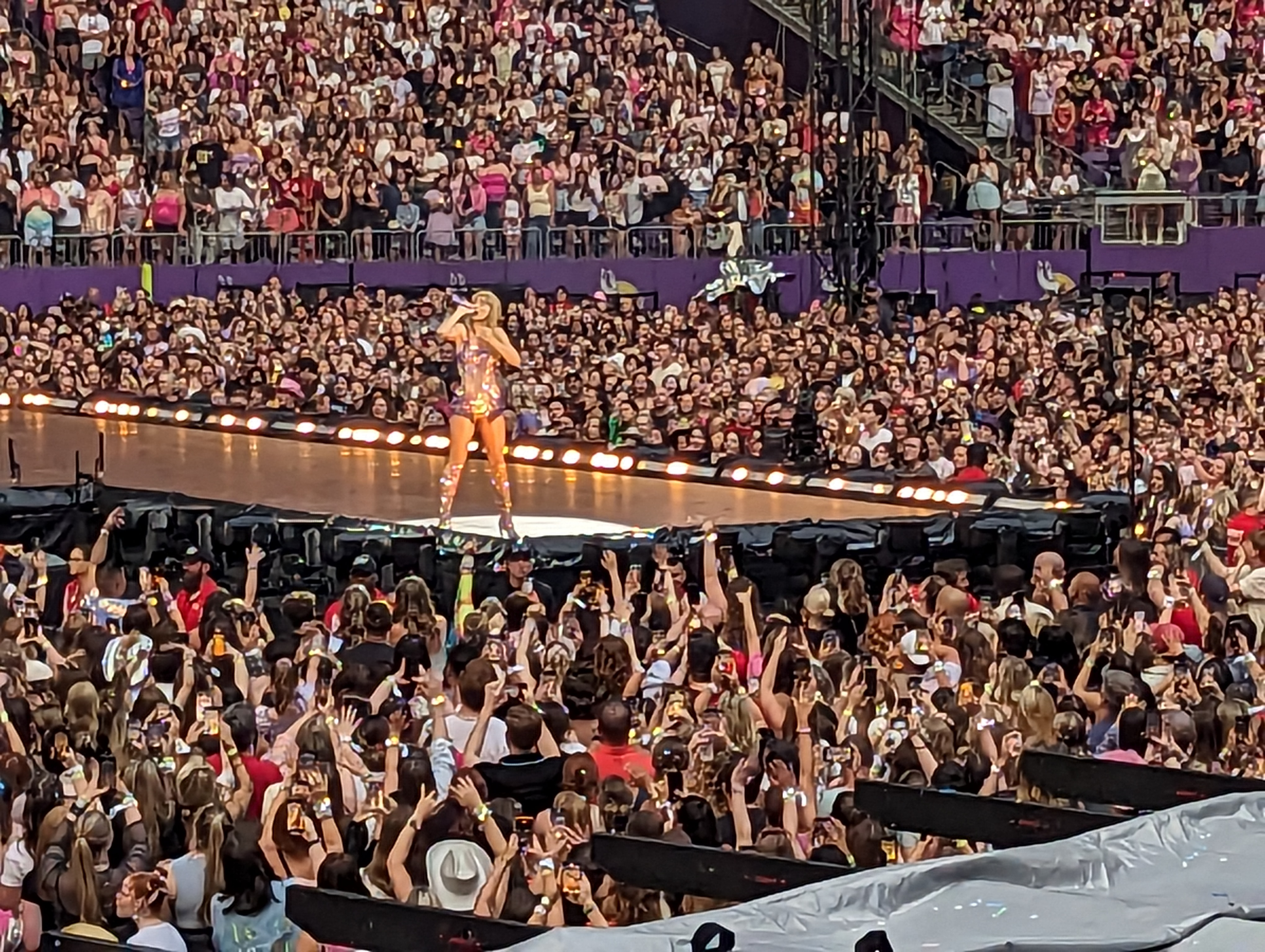
Taylor Swift at U.S. Bank Stadium, Minneapolis, as part of the Eras Tour in 2023

Publications have analyzed the cultural, economic and sociopolitical influence of the Eras Tour, the 2023–2024 concert tour by the American musician Taylor Swift and the highest-grossing tour of all time. Driven by a fan frenzy called Swiftmania, the tour's impact is considered an outcome of Swift's wider influence on the 21st-century popular culture. Concert industry publication Pollstar called the tour "The Greatest Show on Earth".

The Eras Tour, as Swift's first tour after the COVID-19 lockdowns, led an economic demand shock fueled by increased public affinity for entertainment. It recorded unprecedented ticket sale registrations across the globe, including a virtual queue of over 22 million customers for the Singapore tickets. The first sale in the United States crashed controversially, drawing bipartisan censure from lawmakers, who proposed implementation of price regulation and anti-scalping laws at state and federal levels. Legal scholar William Kovacic called it the "Taylor Swift policy adjustment". Price gouging due to the tour was highlighted in the national legislatures of Brazil, Ireland, and the United Kingdom.

Characterized by inflation, trickle-down and multiplier effects, elevated commercial activity and economy were reported in the cities the Eras Tour visited, boosting local businesses, hospitality industry, clothing sales, public transport revenues and tourism more significantly than the Olympics and the Super Bowl. Cities such as Gelsenkirchen, Minneapolis, Pittsburgh, Santa Clara and Stockholm renamed themselves to honor Swift; a number of tourist attractions, including the Center Gai, Christ the Redeemer, Space Needle, Marina Bay Sands and Willis Tower, paid tributes and hosted special events. Politicians such as Canadian prime minister Justin Trudeau and Chilean president Gabriel Boric petitioned Swift to tour their countries, whereas government executives in Indonesia, New Zealand, the Philippines, Taiwan, Thailand and some states of Australia were expressly disappointed at the tour not visiting their venues.

The Eras Tour attracted large crowds of ticketless spectators tailgating outside the sold-out stadiums, with several thousands gathering in Philadelphia, Melbourne and Munich, and was a ubiquitous topic in news cycles, social media content, and press coverage. Seismic activity was recorded in Edinburgh, Lisbon, Los Angeles, Buenos Aires and Seattle due to audience energy. Swift's discography experienced surges in album sales and streams, and achieved several all-time feats on record charts; her 2019 song "Cruel Summer" peaked in its popularity and became one of her most successful singles. The accompanying concert film of the tour featured an atypical film distribution bypassing major film studios and became the highest-grossing concert film in history. Journalists dubbed Swift one of the last remaining monocultural figures of the 21st-century; Time named Swift the 2023 Person of the Year, the first and only person in the arts to receive this honor.

== Demand and geopolitics ==
American singer-songwriter Taylor Swift is often recognized for her success and cultural impact. Her concert tours have all been increasingly lucrative and, after taking a break from touring due to the impact of the COVID-19 pandemic, she announced the sixth headlining concert tour of her career, the Eras Tour, in November 2022. The first United States leg of the tour was announced in November 2022, with 27 concerts across 20 cities. The Latin American, European, Australian and Asian dates were announced in June 2023, visiting 26 cities; popular demand led Swift to increase the number of tour dates in all the continents multiple times. In the end, the Eras Tour became the most expansive tour of Swift's career domestically and globally, with 62 US shows and 90 international shows, for a total of 152 shows.

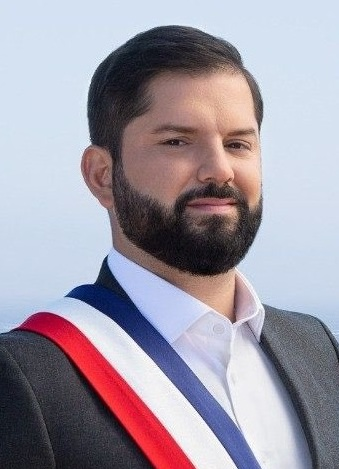
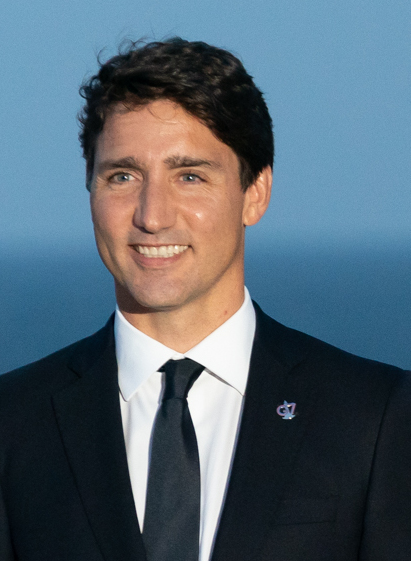
World leaders such as Chilean president Gabriel Boric (left) and Canadian prime minister Justin Trudeau (right) openly requested Swift to bring the Eras Tour to their countries.

Some countries that were expected to receive dates for the tour were absent in Swift's announcements in June 2023, drawing dismay and demands from the Swifties and officials in those territories. Billboard reported that politicians and government officials were "clamoring for a glimpse of the Eras Tour".

=== North and South America ===
Gabriel Boric, the 35th president of Chile, wrote to Swift, requesting her to bring the tour to Chile. Members of the Canadian Parliament filed a grievance with the Speaker of the House of Commons, displeased with the Eras Tour "snubbing" Canada. Canadian Prime Minister Justin Trudeau then invited Swift to tour Canada; one month later, Swift announced six shows in Toronto, followed by three shows in Vancouver later that year. William Watson, writing for the Financial Post, opined that the lawmakers from the Liberal Party of Canada, including Trudeau, will attempt to "nationalize" the distribution of the tour's tickets in Canada in an attempt to win over Swift's fans for the 2025 Canadian federal elections.

Unprecedented demand for the Eras Tour tickets were further reported in as Argentina (three million customers), and Canada (31 million) as well. In Brazil, more than 10 scalpers were arrested for trying to resell tickets originally priced at around R$6,000 (US$1,250) at significantly higher prices. Simone Marquetto, a member of the Brazilian Chamber of Deputies for São Paulo, proposed increasing the maximum prison sentence for scalping from one year to four years and fines up to 100 times the price set by scalpers. President Luiz Inácio Lula da Silva signed a pair of decrees in Brasília on August 31, 2026—one regulating ticket sales and hidden fees, and the other guaranteeing free drinking-water at large events following the controversial death of a Swiftie at a Rio de Janeiro concert. Brazilian media nicknamed the decrees "Taylor Swift law".

==== Price regulation in the United States ====
In the United States, inefficient presale of the Eras Tour tickets by Ticketmaster on November 15, 2022, resulted in a highly publicized controversy. Before the presale, Ticketmaster reported that it received a record-breaking 3.5 million registrations. CNN Business stated that the "astronomical" demand indicated Swift's popularity. On the presale day, Ticketmaster's website crashed and froze due to "historically unprecedented demand". Greg Maffei, chairman of Live Nation Entertainment, said Ticketmaster prepared for 1.5 million verified fans, but 14 million showed up. Ticketmaster also cancelled the November 18 sale due to their inability to meet demand. Swift's fans, upset and enraged with the debacle, accused Ticketmaster of deceit and poor customer service. The topic soon became a subject of public criticism and political scrutiny, as consumer groups criticized Ticketmaster for its allegedly flawed and incompetent systems. US lawmakers, including attorneys general and members of the Congress, took notice of the issue, which became a subject of multiple congressional inquiries. The US Department of Justice opened an antitrust investigation into Live Nation Entertainment and Ticketmaster.

US president Joe Biden pressured ticket platforms into eschewing surprise fees from ticket prices following the Eras Tour fiasco.

Media publications deemed the controversy a testament to Swift's influence and said it could bode well for the music industry by propelling conversations about economic inequality and antitrust laws in the United States. Inspired by the fiasco, various US Congress and state legislature members proposed and enacted a string of bills to ban scalping bots and regulate pricing model. The United States Federal Trade Commission proposed to outlaw junk fees in the country following the controversy, and the National Economic Council, headed by American President Joe Biden, pressed platforms to abandon junk fees in all prices—not just event tickets but for resort bookings and rental costs as well. American legal scholar William Kovacic called the move "the Taylor Swift policy adjustment." According to Carolyn Sloane, assistant professor of economics at the University of California, Riverside, the tour's fiasco spurred mass political action as Swift "has scaled her talent through demographic technology". Following the bipartisan censure of Ticketmaster at a US Senate hearing, Billboard opined that Ticketmaster had the public's despise and thus made an "easy target for rare bipartisan political action". The Washington Post stated the tour fiasco "was so bad it united the parties", whereas CNN, in an article titled "One Nation, Under Swift", said that Swift's fans united the two parties in a way "the Founding Fathers failed to anticipate".

=== Europe ===
Mayor of the Hungarian capital Budapest, Gergely Karácsony, wrote a letter to Swift, requesting the tour in Hungary. Vice-President of the European Commission, Margaritis Schinas, exhorted Swift to help reverse the "historically low" voter turnout in the upcoming European Parliament election by speaking about it on the European leg of the Eras Tour. In 2024, the Prime Minister of Sweden, Ulf Kristersson, attended the tour in Stockholm and noted the tour's economic impact on Sweden. John Swinney, the First Minister of Scotland addressed Swift in a direct message and claimed Scotland is "thrilled" to host the show and the Swifties. Around one million people queued for the tickets in France. Spanish association football club Real Madrid petitioned La Liga officials to reschedule their final match of the season to accommodate an additional Eras Tour show at their home venue, Santiago Bernabéu Stadium.

Forbes reported widespread scalping of the tickets in the United Kingdom, with immediate re-listing on sites like StubHub and Viagogo for extortionate prices. Viagogo responded that "the European leg of Taylor Swift's Eras tour has been long anticipated. We've not seen anything like this since the Beatles and with tickets having only just gone on sale, demand is at its peak right now". Reuters reported that the resale prices of Eras Tour tickets were US$1000 more than other touring acts. Kevin Brennan, a Member of Parliament from Cardiff, demanded a debate in the United Kingdom House of Commons on ticket scalpers and the government's plans to tackle them. In Ireland, politician Thomas Pringle spoke in the Dáil Éireann, the lower house of the Irish Parliament, criticizing the "rampant price gouging" in Dublin during the tour's stop in the city as "disgraceful display of greed" by local hotels.

==== Civic security ====
In July 2024, a suspected stalker of Swift, who was accused of threatening her and her boyfriend, American football player Travis Kelce, on social media was detained and arrested as he attempted to enter the second of Swift's shows in Gelsenkirchen. On August 7, authorities thwarted an Islamic State (ISIS) plot to attack Swift's three shows in Vienna. Police arrested three men—a 17-year-old, 18-year-old and 19-year-old who were "radicalized on the Internet"—with connections to ISIS. The men were plotting to kill "tens of thousands" at the concerts, according to the CIA. All three Vienna shows were canceled with tickets refunded after receiving confirmation from the Government of Austria of an elaborate terrorist plan. The following shows in London also had tightened security.

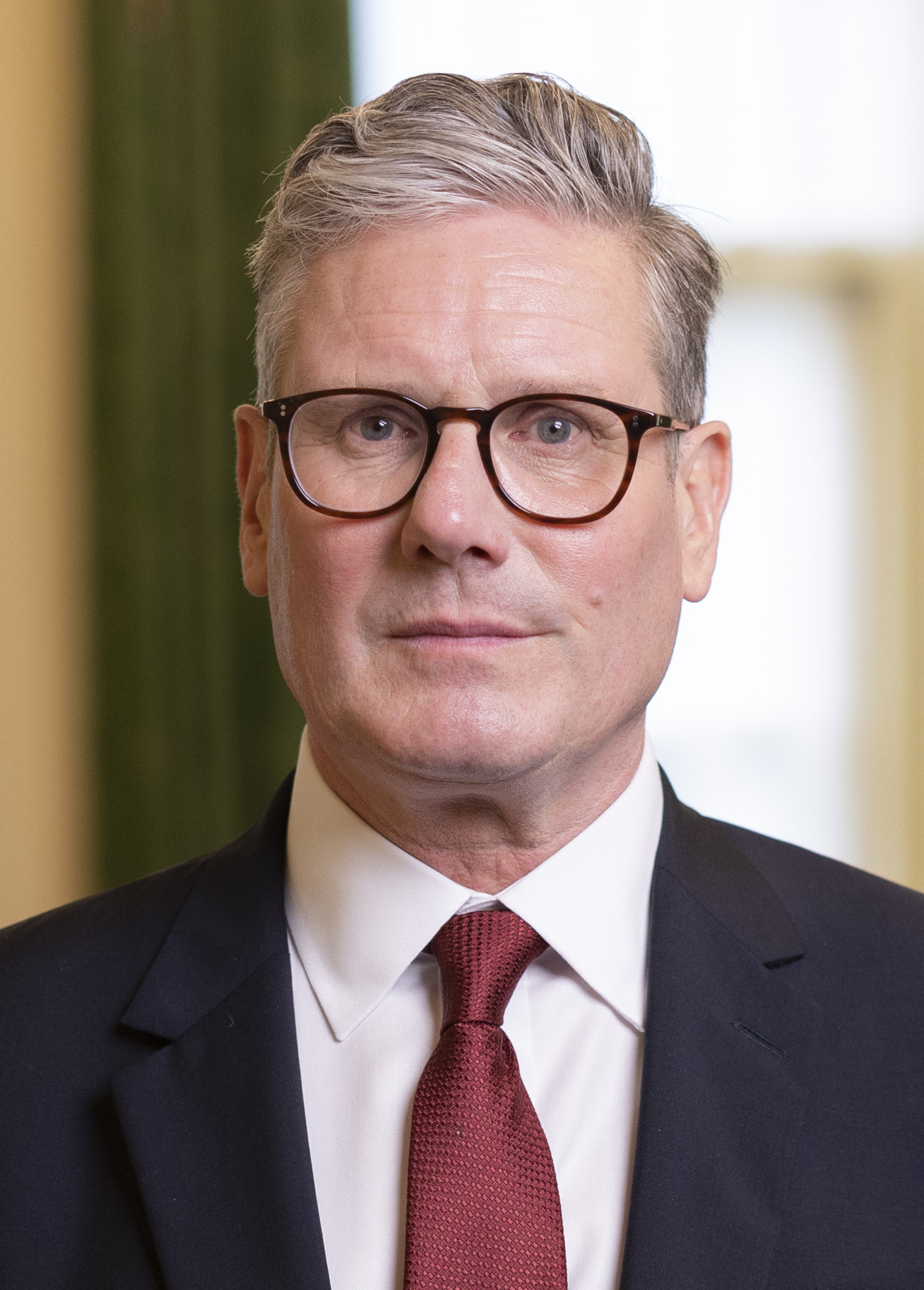
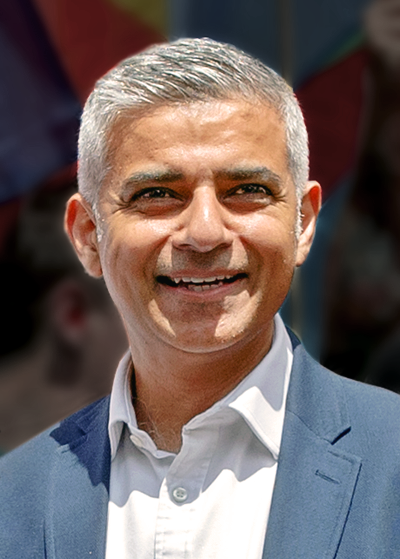
United Kingdom Labour politicians such as the prime minister Keir Starmer (left) and the London mayor Sadiq Khan (right) were accused of bribery and abuse of power after allegedly pressuring the Metropolitan Police to provide Swift with a special security escort.

In October 2024, it was reported that the London Metropolitan Police's Special Escort Group—a top-level security usually provided for members of the British royal family and heads of state—would be provided for Swift and crew for the remainder of the London shows. A political scandal soon developed in the United Kingdom as the politicians of opposition Conservative Party accused the ruling Labour Party of receiving free tickets to the Eras Tour in exchange of the security grant. It was alleged that Labour politicians, ranging from prime minister Keir Starmer to London mayor Sadiq Khan, had received around £20,000 in free tickets, after Swift's demand for the security was initially denied, with the politicians subsequently pressuring the police to give in.

Susan Hall of the Conservative Party, also chair of the Police and Crime Committee on the Greater London Assembly, demanded an official investigation into the issue, calling it "highly concerning" that government officials intervened to change the police's decision. Minister Ellie Reeves did not answer the Conservative Member of Parliaments' questions regarding the controversy in the Parliament of the United Kingdom. Gavin Williamson stated that the Labour government has compromised the operational independence of the police, while Andrew Murrison asserted that "the Special Escort Group needs to be used sparingly and not to ferry entertainers around". The prime minister's office denied that the free tickets were connected to security demands, however admitted that Starmer meeting Swift at the concert could have created a perception of a conflict of interest. Former prime minister Boris Johnson said Swift has made the United Kingdom "look like a banana republic"; Rebecca Reid of i said "the Eras tour has been dragged into a tangential political row" and criticized Johnson of not caring about women's safety; Reid opined that Swift deserves the police convoy in light of the Vienna threat and the Southport stabbing incident.

=== Asia-Pacific ===
In Australia, the Eras Tour visited Sydney and Melbourne for seven dates in total; politicians and Swift's fans in the excluded Australian states (Queensland, South Australia, and Western Australia) expressed their dismay at the tour not visiting their major cities (Brisbane, Adelaide, and Perth, respectively). ABC News journalist Antonia O'Flaherty reported that Brisbane was "definitely holding dates" for the tour at Lang Park but was dropped after finalized Asian and European dates left only two weeks for Australia. New Zealand finance minister Grant Robertson stated, although he was disappointed and despite Swift's popularity and the potential economic boom, he would not spend public money on campaigning for the tour. Nick Sautner, CEO of Auckland's Eden Park, claimed he could not compete with the funding of Australia's Eras Tour campaign. In addition, Eden Park had only one concert slot left in 2024 and a noise curfew of 10:30 pm without requiring a new resource consent.

In Taiwan (Republic of China), Jaw Shaw-kong, a member of the opposition Kuomintang party, stated in a televised debate as part of the campaigns preceding the 2024 Taiwanese presidential and legislative body elections that he had invited Swift to hold a concert at the newly inaugurated Taipei Dome. He claimed that Swift initially agreed to perform but later declined due to "geopolitical risks"—the nature of the bilateral relations between Taiwan and the People's Republic of China. British newspaper The Independent opined that the elections have been "heavily targeted in [Chinese] state media propaganda as a choice between war and peace", amid increased Chinese military activity around Taiwan. The Taiwanese Ministry of Culture neither denied or confirmed Jaw's claims but said several international artists have performed in Taiwan. Kaohsiung mayor Chen Chi-mai described Jaw's claim about Swift as an attempt to manipulate voters. Swift included neither China nor Taiwan in the Eras Tour, despite her large fanbases there.

In China, media reported that the Shanghai's culture and tourism bureau had been talking with Swift's team in January 2025, one month after the tour concluded in Vancouver, to let Taylor resume the tour for few more shows and letting Taylor bring the tour to Shanghai. Swift's team has not yet responded to the request yet.

==== Singapore's exclusivity in Southeast Asia ====
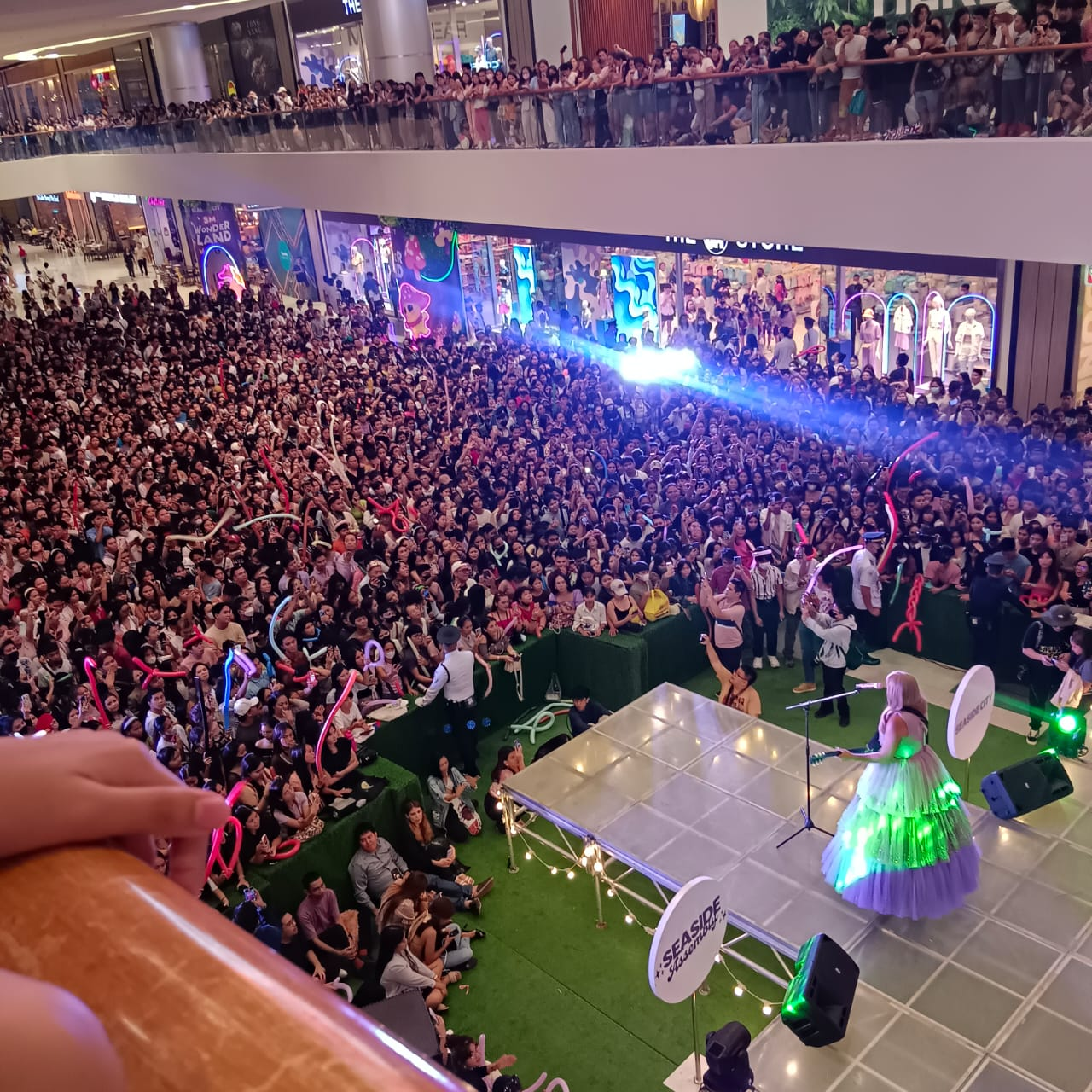
Filipino drag queen and Swift impersonator Taylor Sheesh emulating the Eras Tour at SM Seaside City, a mall in Cebu City, Philippines

The Eras Tour caused a diplomatic crisis in Southeast Asia. Singapore was the region's only country included in the tour, receiving six dates, while Thailand, Indonesia, and the Philippines were not included despite much anticipation.

Over an unprecedented 22 million people competed for the tour's Singapore tickets. Media outlets had reported large crowds of fans gathered in various Philippine malls to watch recreations of the tour by Taylor Sheesh, a Filipino drag queen and Swift impersonator. Quartz reported that the Indonesian minister of tourism and creative economy, Sandiaga Uno, had taken note of the tour skipping Indonesia, Southeast Asia's largest economy, and decided to ease the permit process for international touring acts. Academics and critics in Indonesia also agreed that the Indonesian government should amend its policies to host musical efforts such as the Eras Tour.

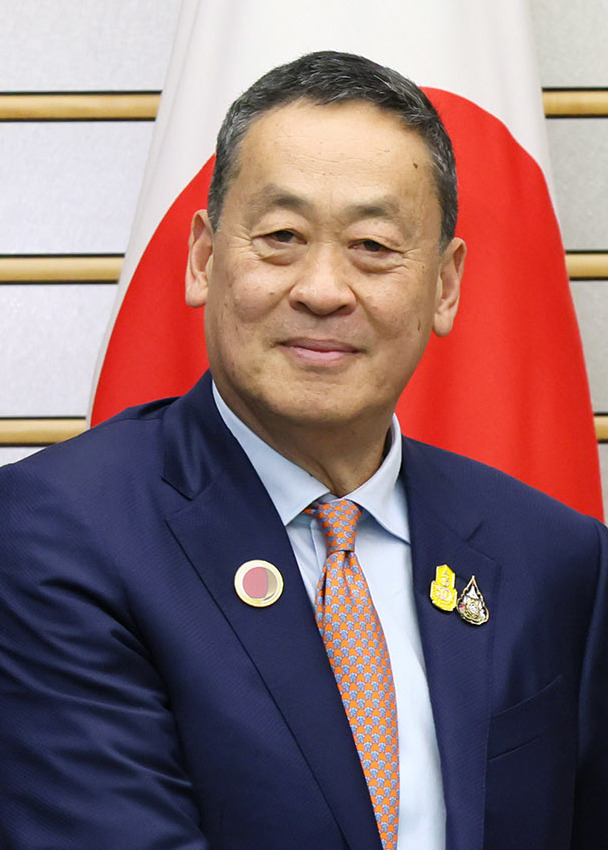
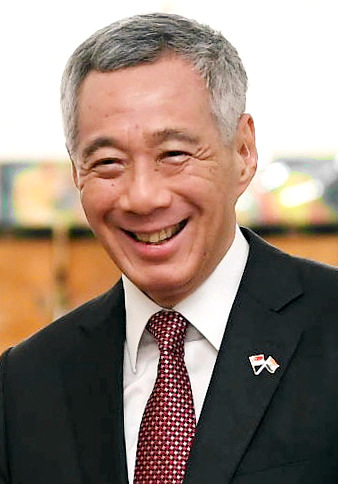
Thailand prime minister Srettha Thavisin (left) accused Singapore of luring the Eras Tour away from other Southeast Asian countries. Singaporean prime minister Lee Hsien Loong (right) defended it as a "successful arrangement" of his government.

In February 2024, Bangkok Post reported that Srettha Thavisin, the Prime Minister of Thailand since 2023, expressed his disappointment with Singapore exclusively hosting the Eras Tour amongst the member countries of ASEAN, an international union of Southeast Asian countries. He claimed that the Singaporean government offered subsidies of $2 million–$3 million per show in exchange for exclusivity. Emphasizing her global appeal, Thavisin stated that Thai Swifties "had been eagerly awaiting the chance to experience Swift's musical magic live." Pita Limjaroenrat, leader of the Move Forward Party, had previously petitioned Swift to bring the Eras Tour to Thailand; he noted that the country had become a democracy in the years following the 2014 Thai coup d'état that led to the cancellation of her show in Bangkok on the Red Tour.

Joey Salceda, member of the House of Representatives of the Philippines, criticized Singapore for the exclusivity deal, not being a "good neighbor", and disregarding the principles of solidarity upon which ASEAN was founded. He demanded that the Philippine Department of Foreign Affairs seek an explanation on the deal from the Singaporean embassy to the Philippines. Uno also expressed disappointment, claiming that "Indonesia was eager to replicate the success of Swiftonomics, which has hugely benefited the tourism industry in Singapore and Australia.

In response, the Singapore Tourism Board (STB) published a statement confirming that they did provide a "grant" to bring the tour to the country, and that the Ministry of Culture, Community and Youth worked with the tour's promoter, Anschutz Entertainment Group (AEG). Minister Edwin Tong refused to disclose any exact figures, adding that the total sum of the grant is not as high as what is being claimed. Singaporean diplomat Bilahari Kausikan argued that Singapore, as a small city-state, cannot afford to be "inefficient" like its neighbors due to competition, and asked "are we supposed to hold ourselves back just because some of our neighbours are slow?" He praised the STB for quickly securing the deal with Swift. Hariz Baharudin of The Straits Times opined that Singapore attracted Swift by offering connectivity, infrastructure and security unlike other Southeast Asian countries.

On March 5, 2024, Lee Hsien Loong, the Prime Minister of Singapore since 2004, was interrogated on the issue in an ASEAN press conference with Australian prime minister Anthony Albanese; Lee confirmed that the grant did contain exclusivity terms but assured that it was not a hostile move towards other Southeast Asian countries. The Straits Times correspondent Anjali Raguraman reported that Tong's team, also consisting of representatives of Sport Singapore and the management of Singapore Sports Hub, flew to Los Angeles to negotiate with Swift's agent before any international tour dates were confirmed and requested for Singapore to be "the host at the end of any particular segment of the tour", facilitating an option to add more dates in case of higher demand. The Eras Tour in Singapore was extended to an additional week for six shows in total, after the first three shows quickly sold out.

Members of the Malaysian United Indigenous Party, including the deputy president Ahmad Faizal Azumu, called for the government of Malaysia to answer for its "failure to secure" the Eras Tour. The issue was subsequently escalated in the Parliament of Malaysia in March 2024; Chong Zhemin, the MP of Kampar, asked the government to address claims that Malaysia "failed to seize the opportunity" to host Swift following reports that the country would. Deputy youth and sports minister, Adam Adli, responded that Swift never offered to tour Malaysia under the government's joint contract with the sports advisory company Sportswork and the event/venue promoter ASM Global; Sportswork clarified that the Eras Tour was never part of the deal with ASM. However, the MP of Stampin, Chong Chieng Jen, blamed the Malaysian Islamic Party for repelling international musicians such as Swift away from Malaysia due to its Islamist censure of foreign acts.

== Economy and commerce ==
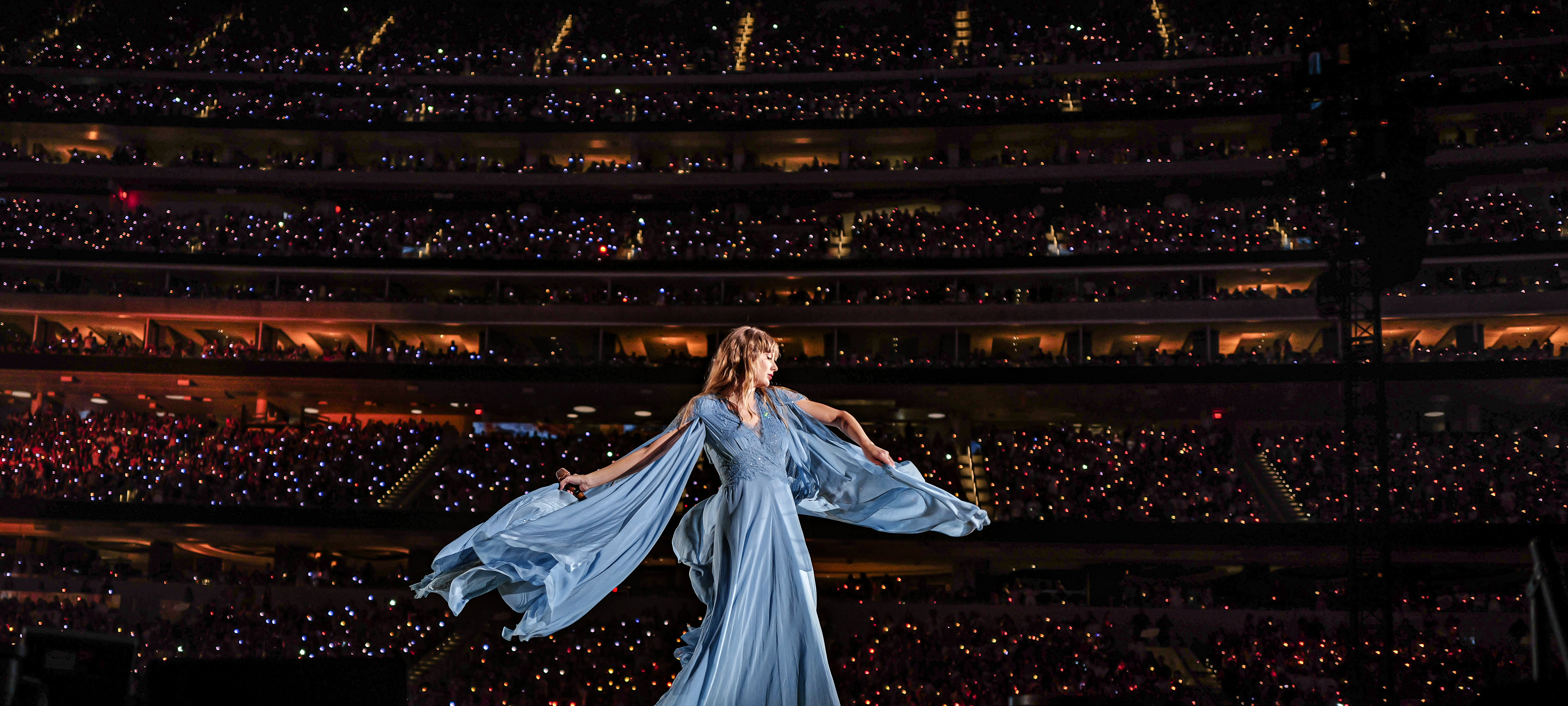
Swift performing at SoFi Stadium in Inglewood, California, on August 9, 2023

The Eras Tour fueled the commerce and economies of various cities and territories. According to Billboard, "the arrival of Eras in a new town every weekend brought with it not only an avalanche of hype, media attention and near-groveling from the host cities, but enough traveling business to give local economies a notable boost." Financial analysts called it the "TSwift Lift" to the economy after the COVID-19 recession. The Wall Street Journal coined the term "Taylornomics" to explain the economics involved in and around the Eras Tour. Economist Mara Klaunig stated that "people are willing to travel far and wide to see [Swift]", making the tour a unique case of economic study. A number of business executives reported the tour's favorable impact on their companies' performance. According to JLL, the tour generated approximately US$1 billion in additional revenue for the hoteling industry across the United States, Europe and Asia, with an impact "rivaling traditional tourism drivers like the Super Bowl and even the Olympics during its peak periods."

=== Local business ===
The Federal Reserve credited Swift with boosting the United States economy at large. According to Bloomberg Economics, the Eras Tour contributed US$4.3 billion to the Gross domestic product (GDP) of the United States. In urban areas, the tour boosted the hospitality industry, including hotels, local businesses and tourism revenues by millions of dollars. The Robb Report, citing analysis by Mastercard, reported an extra $100 million in sales by restaurants in the United States in 2023. Various restaurants, bars, parks and other businesses organized Swift-themed activities and events, as well as special menus. Such Swift-themed eatables and articles quickly ran out of stock in various food outlets and retailers. The economic impact of Swift's Eras tour has been compared to sporting events such as the Olympic Games, Super Bowl, and FIFA World Cup.

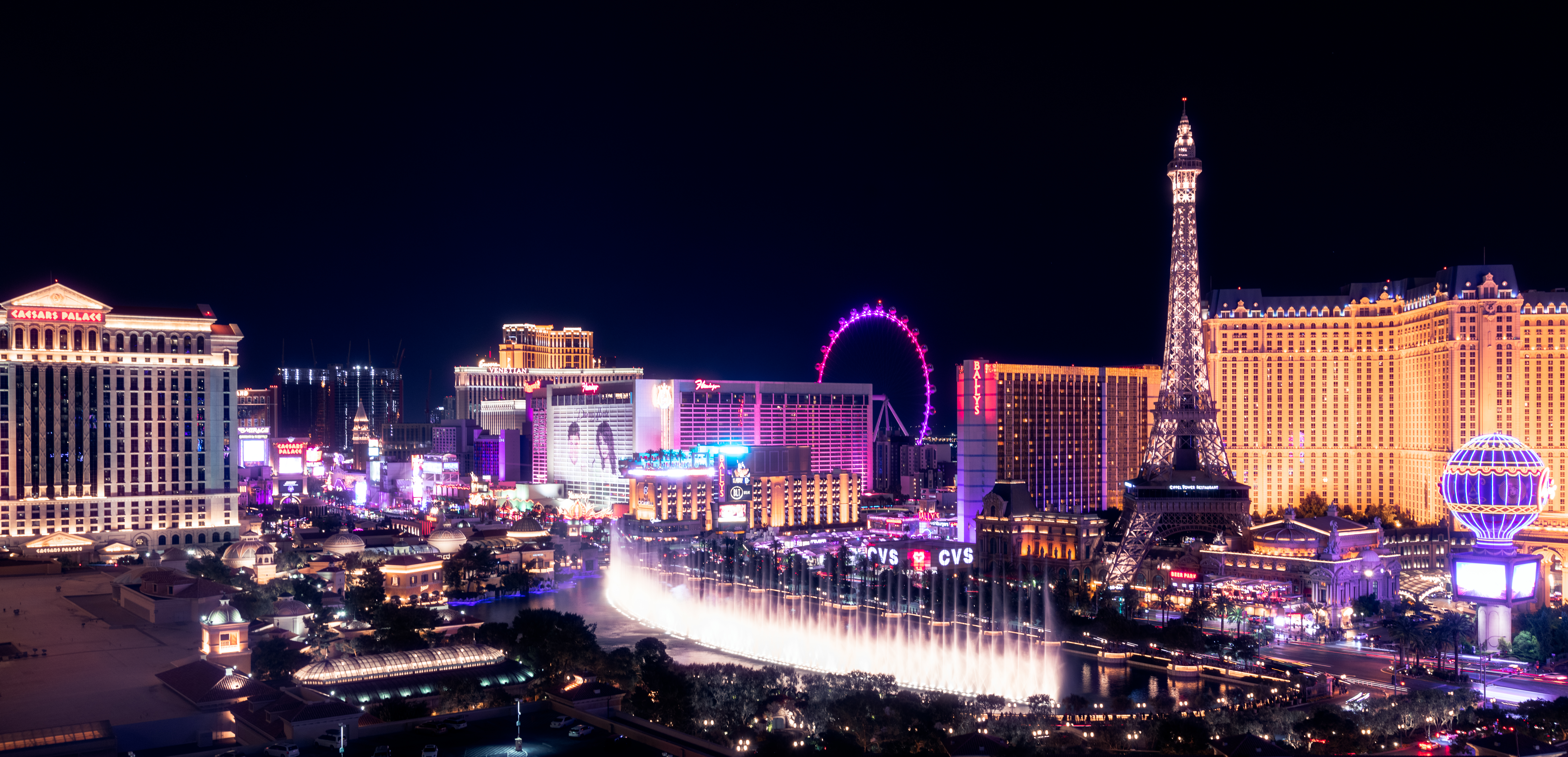
The tour replenished the economy of Las Vegas to "pre-pandemic levels".

In the Western United States, the first shows in Glendale were more profitable for local businesses than Super Bowl LVII one month earlier. The Las Vegas Convention and Visitors Authority credited the tour with restoring the economy of Las Vegas to "pre-pandemic levels". The tour's two nights in Denver were projected to add $140 million into Colorado's economy. In Seattle, downtown hotels reported a record $7.4 million in revenue, $2 million more than the record set by the Major League Baseball All-Star Game earlier in the same month. Hotel occupancy rates in Santa Clara were at least 98% weeks before the tour arrived to the city. The tour's two nights generated an estimated $33.5 million in economic impact to Santa Clara County, comparable to National Football League matches.

A labor union representing hotel workers from 60 hotels in Los Angeles and Orange counties were at strike since their contracts with the hotels expired on June 30, 2023. One week before the Eras Tour's six Los Angeles concerts, the union protested outside the Hyatt Regency LAX with posters inspired by the Eras Tour aesthetics and an open letter to Swift, which claimed that her concerts make the hotels "a lot of money" and urged her to postpone the concerts in solidarity with the strike. A dozen Californian politicians, including Eleni Kounalakis, the Lieutenant Governor of California, signed a petition asking Swift to postpone the concerts. The tour in Los Angeles generated a $320 million boost to the county's GDP. The California Center for Jobs & the Economy estimated that the tour's six-date residency in Los Angeles increased local employee's earnings by $160 million.

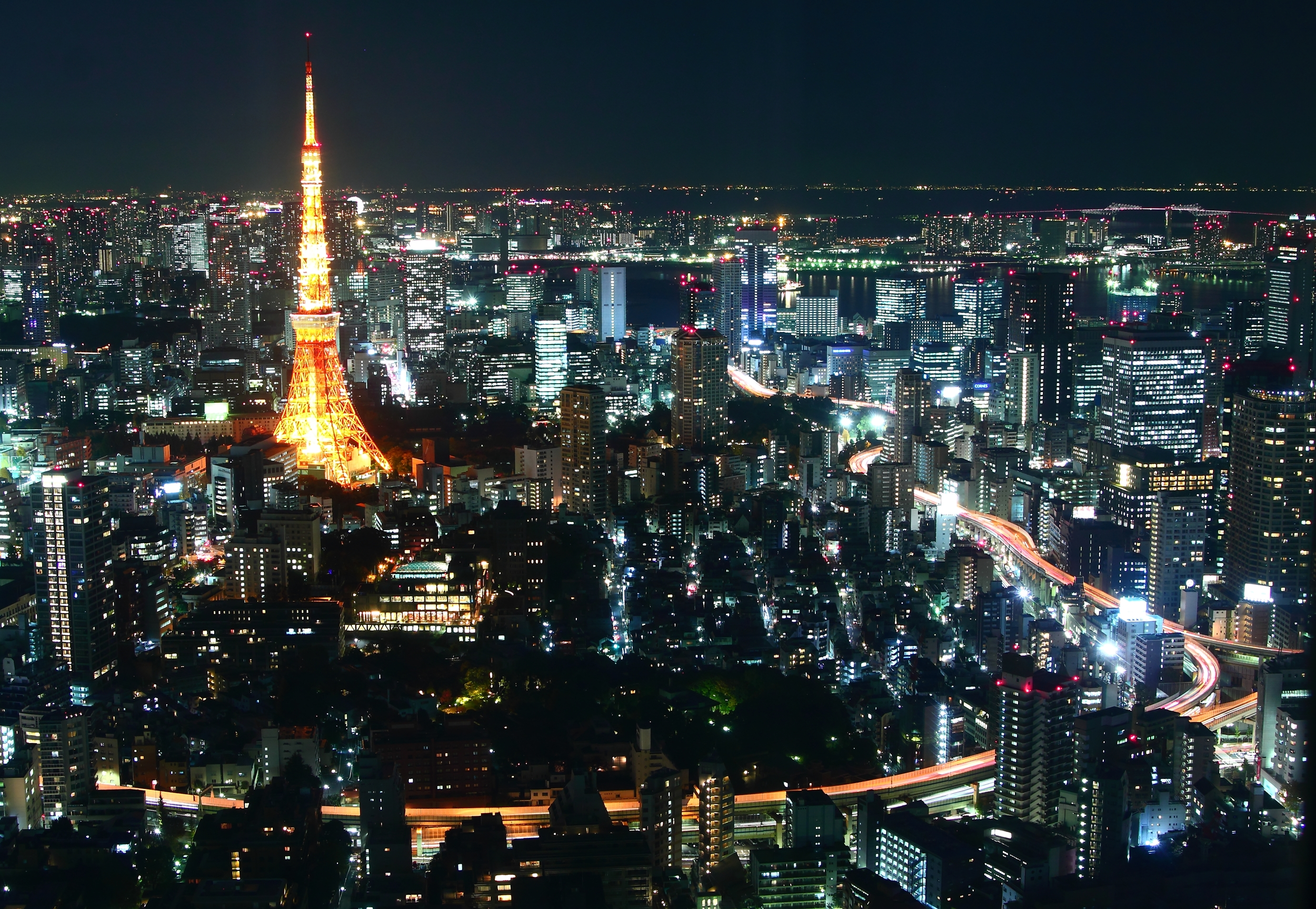
Japanese economist Mitsumasa Etou called Swift's four-day stop in Tokyo (pictured) as "Japan's biggest ever musical event".

In the Southern United States, the three-day stop in Tampa, Florida, caused a huge increase in demand for hotel rooms, car-parking services and clothing stores; the concerts generated US$730,000 in taxes for the city. According to the Houston First Corporation, the three-night stop at NRG Stadium resulted in Houston's highest hotel revenue week of 2023. Nashville, Tennessee reported $28 million in hotel revenue from two nights. New Orleans reported an economic impact of $500 million from the tour.

All hotel rooms, restaurant reservations, and train tickets were sold out in Boston days before the Eras Tour shows in nearby Foxborough, Massachusetts. Per Booking.com, the average hotel room prices in Pittsburgh, Minneapolis and Kansas City, Missouri increased three to five folds in anticipation of the tour; the hotel occupancy rate in Allegheny County, Pennsylvania, approached 100% and reservation platforms crashed due to web traffic. In the Great Lakes region, Chicago's Eras Tour dates marked the highest hotel occupancy in the city's history, contributing to the state of Illinois recording its highest hotel revenue ever in a fiscal year. Eras Tour-related consumer spending in Cincinnati was estimated to be $48 million.

In Latin America, Swift's shows in Mexico City generated an estimated Mex$1,000,000,000 (US$59 million) in revenue across the city. Veja estimated a "tremendous" R$400,000,000 (US$74 million) economic boost for Brazil during the tour. Whereas in Asia, Mitsumasa Etou, professor from Tokyo City University, projected an economic boost of up to ¥34,100,000,000 (US$229.6 million) in Japan, making the tour "Japan's biggest ever musical event", surpassing the Fuji Rock Festival. Bloomberg estimated that the tour's six shows in Singapore would increase the country's GDP by 0.2 percentage points (approximately US$200 million). According to Sally Capp, Lord Mayor of Melbourne, Australia, the tour generated an estimated A$1,200,000,000 (US$780 million) in economic value for the city. Venues NSW chief executive Kerrie Mather said the four shows in Sydney will contribute around A$135,800,000 (US$88.7 million) to the state's economy.

The Eras Tour was more profitable for the French capital Paris than the 2024 Summer Olympics in terms of economy and tourism.

Cities across Europe, especially those in the vicinity of the Eras Tour, reported a sharp rise in demand for hotel and short-term rental accommodation. CNBC reported an estimated £1 billion (US$1.27 billion) bonus to the entire U.K. economy from the tour. Hotel rooms in Edinburgh, Liverpool and Cardiff sold out for the June 2024 dates of the tour as early as August 2023, whereas over 80 percent of the hotel rooms in Paris and Warsaw nearly sold out months before the cities' dates. Evening Standard reported that, according to data from Barclays, presales for the tour significantly boosted overall consumer spending in the United Kingdom in July 2023. Swift's shows were estimated to boost London's economy by £300 million (US$380 million), and Edinburgh's by £77 million (US$98 million). In Ireland, concert-related spending increased by 88 percent as the country's hotel sector recorded an unusual five percent increase following the Eras Tour and Coldplay's Music of the Spheres World Tour. At the 2024 Bank of America Gaming & Lodging Conference in September 2024, Hyatt CEO Mark Hoplamazian credited part of Hyatt's strong performance in Europe with the Taylor Swift effect.

For Paris, the Eras Tour was more profitable than the 2024 Summer Olympics it hosted, in terms of economy and tourism. In Stockholm, all of the city's 40,000 hotel rooms were sold out. Its tourism board estimated an unprecedented €50 million (US$53.4 million) in consumer spending, not including the money spent on tickets; the concerts generated €220 million (US$260 million) in city revenue, ten times the impact of Beyoncé's Renaissance World Tour (€21 million; US$24.8 million) and nearly twenty times that of Lady Gaga's The Chromatica Ball (€12 million; US$14.1 million). A€25 million (US$29.5 million) boost was predicted for Madrid's economy, especially to its hospitality industry. Vienna experienced a 430 percent increase in rental bookings around its Eras Tour dates.

In Toronto, Canada, the tour's six concerts were estimated to generate CA$282 million in economic activity, which was the biggest boost from a music event for the city since SARSStock in 2003. In Vancouver, the three dates in the city were estimated to generate CA$157 million in economic impact, which rivaled the 2010 Winter Olympics in terms of driving business to local restaurants and surpassed the gains from the city's Black Friday.

=== Civil transport ===
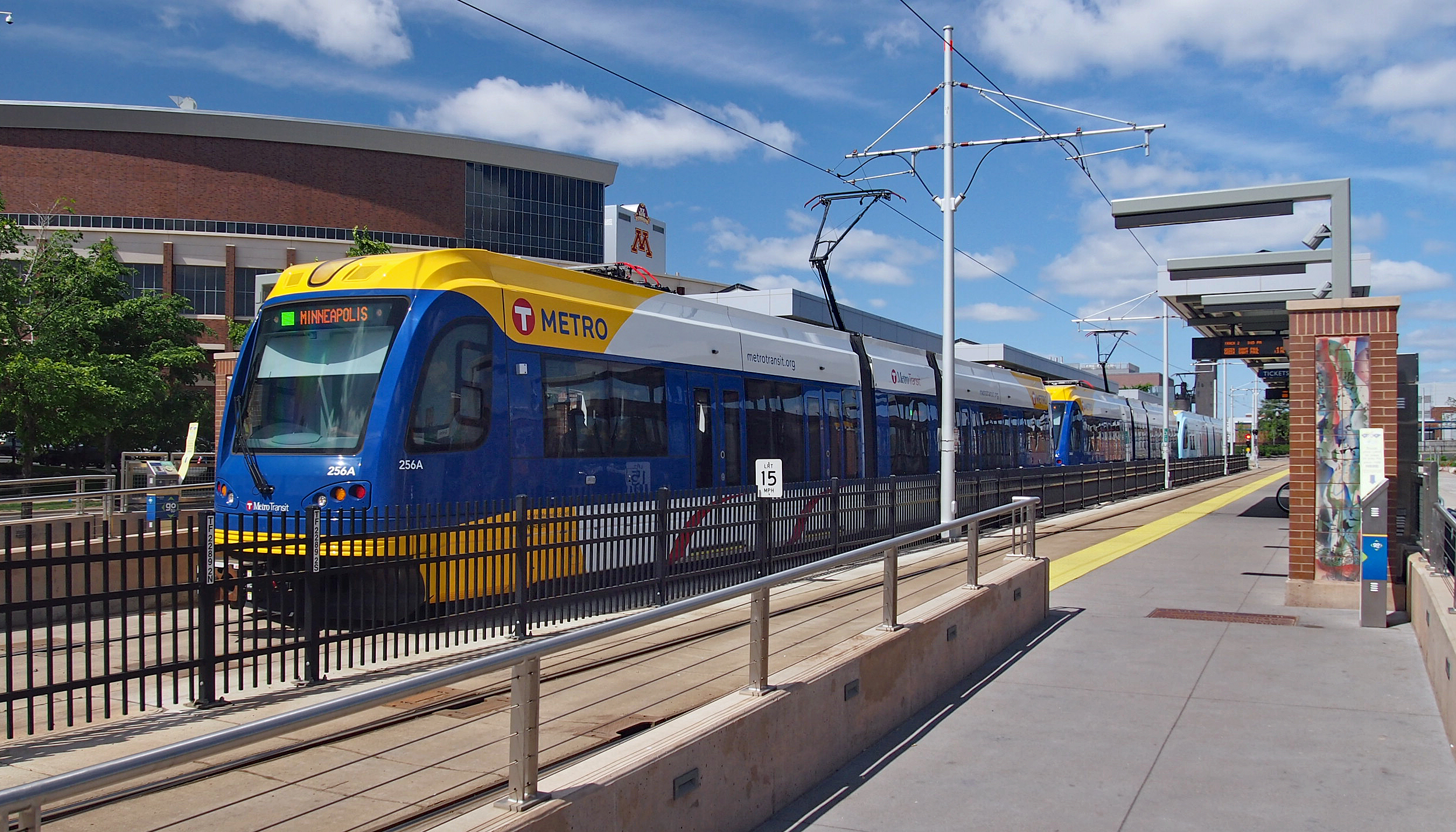
Revenues of public transport services hiked during the tour. Transport agencies such as the Metro Transit (pictured) of the Twin Cities extended its rail services for the tour.

CNN labeled Swift a "public transit savior", reporting that transit agencies received a "much-needed" post-pandemic boost, thanks to concert-goers commuting via subways, buses, and trains to and from the Eras Tour venues. Abnormally higher traffic were reported in downtown areas. The Los Angeles Times reported cities across the United States saw "ridership surge" from the Eras Tour attendees who chose to take transit. In Atlanta, around 140,000 fans took transit to reach the Mercedes-Benz Stadium, tripling the usual ridership. In Chicago, the tour generated 43,000 bus and train trips, resulting in the highest weekly ridership for the transit system since 2019. In cases of inadequacy, special trains were announced for concertgoers with extended service in places such as Minneapolis, Sacramento, Greater Los Angeles, and Mexico City. Train reservations to Madrid from other cities in Spain tripled in the Eras Tour's timeframe. Ireland's Iarnród Éireann and Scotland's ScotRail ran additional trains, late-night services, and extra carriages to and from Dublin and Edinburgh, respectively.

Flight bookings to and within Australia peaked around the tour dates, especially arrivals from New Zealand and South Korea. On February 16, 2024, the day of the first concert in Melbourne, Australia, Melbourne Airport recorded its busiest day since the COVID-19 pandemic in terms of passengers and take-offs and landings.

A number of airlines across the world facilitated special arrangements for Eras Tour attendees. Australian flag carrier Qantas added 64 more flights between Sydney and Melbourne and Auckland, Brisbane and Perth. Air New Zealand experienced what it dubbed the "Swift surge"—people rushing to book flights to Australia, where Swift was announced to perform in February 2023. The airline added 14 more flights from Auckland, Wellington, and Christchurch to Sydney and Melbourne. Philippine Airlines promoted flights from Manila to Tokyo, Sydney, Melbourne, and Singapore. After Swift postponed her second Buenos Aires show by two days due to inclement weather, South American carriers LATAM Airlines, Sky Airline and JetSmart Argentina allowed fans to rebook flight tickets at no cost. Industry executives called the move "highly unusual". LATAM continued their flexibility policy and waived all fees or any differences in fare for ticket-holders who would book return flights from Rio de Janeiro following the postponement of the second date from November 18 to 20 due to extreme heat and the death of a fan, with Gol Linhas Aéreas, and Azul Brazilian Airlines following suit. Following the 2024 Vienna terrorism plot that resulted in the cancellation of Swift's three shows in the city, Austrian Airlines announced that exception was being applied to its usual refund policy for fans affected. Visa applications in India surged by 20 percent around the Eras Tour.

Both of Singapore's major airlines, the flagship carrier Singapore Airlines and budget carrier Scoot, registered surges in demand for flights to Singapore in March 2024, particularly from Southeast Asia and China. Jetstar Asia confirmed a 20 percent surge for routes connecting destinations such as Bangkok, Manila, and Jakarta to Singapore. Macroeconomist Erica Tay reported that over 70 percent of the tour's attendees in Singapore are flying in from overseas. Flight bookings to and from Singapore on Traveloka increased sixfold around the Eras Tour dates. United Airlines noted a similar phenomenon in their summer ticket bookings in Europe. Stockholm Chamber of Commerce's chief economist, Carl Bergqvist, reported that airlines have added additional flights from Denmark, Finland and Norway to help attendees reach the Stockholm shows.

=== Theory and principle ===
The economics of the Eras tour, including Swift's overall economic impact, has been termed "Swiftonomics" by economists and journalists. It was first coined by economic analyst Augusta Saraiva, who stated that the Eras Tour's unprecedented ticket sales represented a "post-COVID demand shock" in the United States, with consumers prioritizing entertainment over an imminent recession. Economics academic Melissa Kearney wrote that COVID-19 affected the public's views about "what's really important to them, and what brings them joy." Los Angeles Times defined Swiftonomics as a microeconomic theory that explains Swift's supply and demand, and political impact following the COVID-19 pandemic. The Chair of the Federal Reserve, Jerome Powell, stated "it's good to see" the Eras Tour helping the American economy but cautioned "stronger growth could lead over time to higher inflation and that would require an appropriate response from monetary policy ... So we'll be watching that carefully and seeing how it evolves over time." As per CNBC, Swiftonomics has impacted every town in the United States.

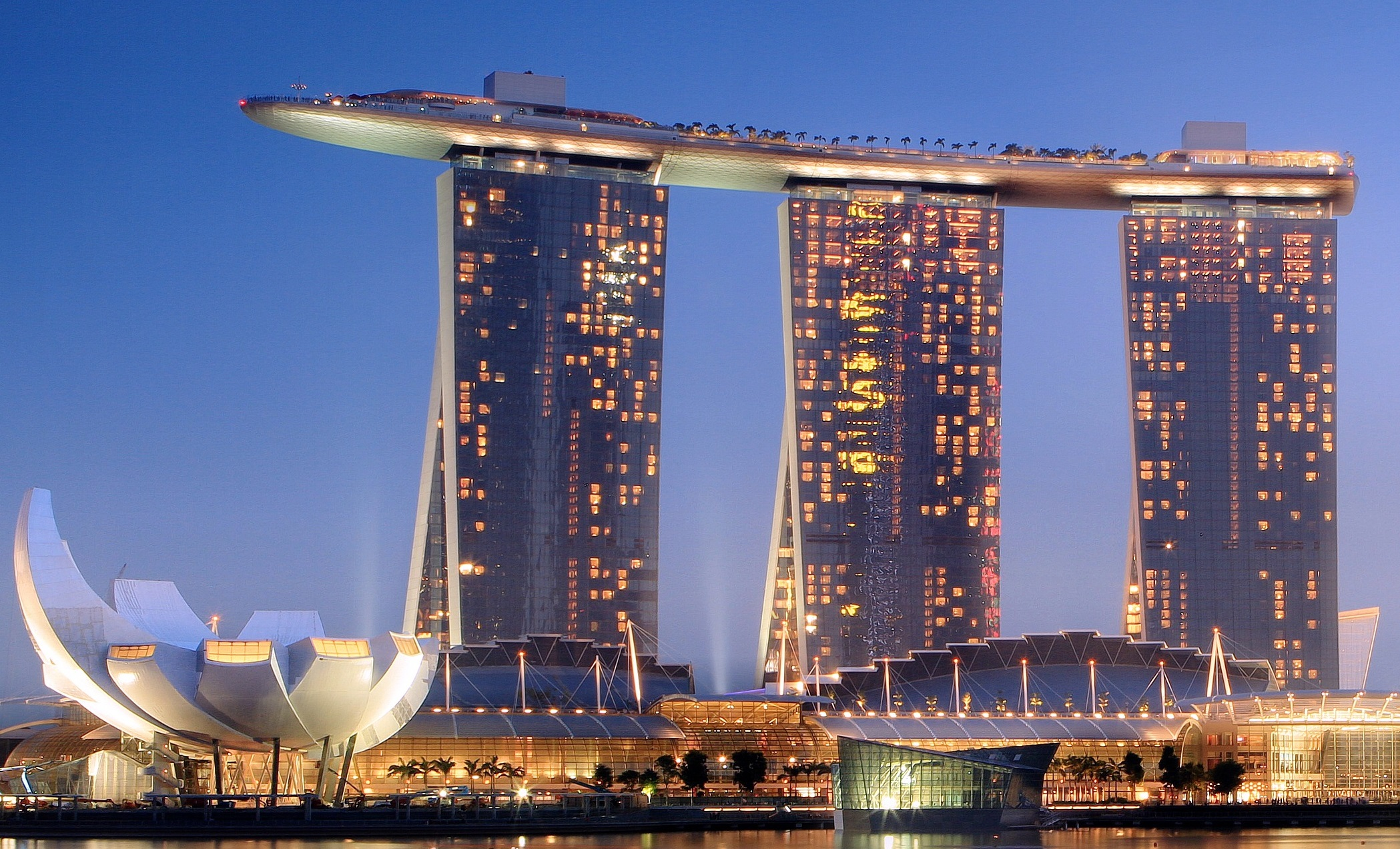
The Eras Tour's six-day residency in Singapore is part of the government plan to promote the city as Asia's music capital. Marina Bay Sands sold tickets bundled with hotel stays and other experiences.

The demand shock was also further reported in Argentina and Australia. Economists who observed the inflation in Southeast Asia termed it "Swiftflation". Marketing professor Seshan Ramaswami wrote that the Eras Tour is one of the significant steps in a movement involving the Government of Singapore's conscious attempts to expand the demographic reach of the city-state's cultural tourism "to young music fans ... From all over Asia and perhaps even the Middle East". Following the tour's tie-up with the United Overseas Bank for premium tickets in Singapore, the bank reported a record S$104 million (US$76 million) in income from credit card fees, an 89% increase from the previous year in the quarter.

According to a survey by online research company QuestionPro, 58 percent of the Eras Tour attendees were between ages 35 and 64, 37 percent between ages 18 and 34, and less than 5 percent under age 18. The tour's economic valuation was also estimated to be $5 billion, higher than the GDP of 50 countries. QuestionPro later increased the estimate to $6.3 billion in the United States and Canada. Other economic agencies projected an impact as high as $80 billion globally. According to Insider, one movie studio marketing team found that attendees of the Eras Tour spent an average of $300 per concert. Business magazine Fortune reported that fans spent an average of $1,300 on tickets, travel, and clothes to attend the tour, implying that the Eras Tour could raise $4.6 billion in consumer spending in the United States, and consequently "save" the United States from recession. After the tour concluded, QuestionPro estimated a $5 billion boost for the US economy in direct spending, whereas the US Travel Association calculated a $10 billion boost, factoring in indirect spendings on the tour.

MarketWatch named Swift one of the most influential persons in the stock market, reporting that "vigorous consumer spending epitomized by the Eras Tour helped the U.S. avert a widely predicted summer recession." Similar sentiments were raised by journalists in other countries. The Guardian business columnist Greg Jericho opined that the Eras Tour could save Australia from recession as well. Journalist Swati Pandey wrote, "as recession risks in Australia mount, one unexpected factor could deliver a boost to the economy just when it's under maximum pressure from the Reserve Bank's aggressive interest rate increases: Taylor Swift." The Reserve Bank governor, Michele Bullock, affirmed that "the Taylor Swift inflation effect has forced some spending adjustments" but it would not lead to a detrimental inflation. The Globe and Mail's Tony Keller claimed Swift is the solution to the issues in the Canadian economy. Economists in the United Kingdom projected a minimal macroeconomic impact in the country from the tour but that Swiftlation will affect the hotel industry. Bank of England faced a "dilemma" about cutting interest rates for August 2024 after inflation held steady at 2 percent when economists had expected a 1.9 percent decline.

Maria Psyllou, economics professor from the University of Birmingham, called the Eras Tour a "complex economic environment". She wrote that the consumers' readiness to spend their money on the tour despite an ongoing global economic deceleration is an example of the trickle-down economic effect, wherein the spending of high-income individuals benefits lower sectors of society, stimulating economic growth and opportunities for a wider spectrum of businesses in turn. Pysllou stated, the Eras Tour shows "the audience's willingness to allocate their resources to experiences they have missed—travel, entertainment, leisure—during the pandemic" and is "a testament to the potent interplay between culture, economics, and human behavior." Anne Steele and Sarah Krouse from The Wall Street Journal opined that the Eras Tour is an example of "women's multiplier effect", showing how women's entertainment can impact the economy. Baharudin characterized Swiftonomics as an economic snowball effect.

== Mass media ==
"[Swift's] Eras Tour, which launched in Glendale, Arizona on March 17, hasn't launched a viral moment so much as the tour itself has gone viral, further spreading to every corner of the internet with every successive date. Each stop has dominated the news cycle for days, whether due to its special guests, its surprise songs, its celebrity attendees, its Easter eggs, or its volcanic fan response—even the introduction of a new outfit to Swift's rotation can be headline-worthy."

— Andrew Unterberger, Billboard

The Eras Tour was a phenomenon in mass media, especially on social media. Various moments and events of and during the tour became topics of news coverage and wide social media engagement both domestically and internationally. To Horton, it grew into a "mass cultural moment", generating "unceasing buzz" and "a vast, ever-expanding digital world of clips, reactions, live-streams, dissections and analysis"; hence, apart from just Swift's performances, the mythology, celebrity gossip and fan culture surrounding the tour drove news cycles, expanding the "Swiftverse and dissolving its borders with everything else even further." She described the Eras Tour as "not so much as a series of concerts, but as an ongoing, sprawling, interactive and ever-mutating reality show, with new chapters every week." Media outlets reported on the numerous fan-run livestreams of each tour show, viewed by thousands of people on TikTok nightly. According to telecommunications company AT&T, fans set data usage records on the company's network in numerous stadiums. Various brands, celebrities and companies posted parodies of the Eras Tour poster on social media.

A topic of constant media coverage, the Eras Tour was attended by a large number of celebrities across fields such as cinema, television, music and sports, as well as by various political figures. Billboard thus described the tour as a "genuinely epic event", stating that "none of Swift's peers has enjoyed the kind of cultural cachet she has attained." Culture journalist Kate Lindsay dubbed the tour "post-reality TV" in her newsletter. According to Tyler Foggatt of The New Yorker, Swift "has done to stadium shows what Beyoncé did to Coachella, and to millennials what Bruce Springsteen did to baby boomers. She has crafted a spectacle—a long-form, real-life experience in an age that is otherwise dominated by short-form online content—though the tour is also perfectly designed to be consumed online."

Swift was the most photographed person of 2023. Billboard critics agreed that Swift has dominated 2023 commercially and culturally, and some of them opined that the persisting success of Midnights, followed by the Eras Tour, and the release of Speak Now (Taylor's Version) could "overexpose" Swift once again. Glamour raised the same concern, stating Swift has dominated all aspects of popular culture in 2023, resulting in a "Swift monoculture". The Hollywood Reporter opined, Swift became a "queen of all media" with the tour, dominating the concert, streaming and film spheres; Deadline Hollywood referred to Swift as "The Monarch of All Media". Following the media frenzy surrounding the Eras Tour in Brazil, Vulture opined Swift "might actually be more popular than Jesus in the country." Describing the Eras Tour in Europe, Josiah Gogarty of UnHerd opined that Swift is "keeping mass culture alive"; Fortune remarked that the Eras Tour in Paris overshadowed the 2024 Summer Olympics in terms of both tourism and media attention.

Dictionary.com named the word "Era" the "Vibe of the Year" of 2023. Grant Barrett, head of lexicography at the firm, opined that they "saw a real surge in the use of eras across popular culture" in 2023, owing to the Eras Tour, "the year's most high-profile, record-setting, impossible-to-ignore cultural phenomenon". Mary Kate Carr of The A.V. Club wrote "From her tabloid-famous romances to the blockbuster success of her re-recordings to the incredible economic impact of Eras Tour, there wasn't a facet of pop culture that Swift's influence didn't reach".

During the first U.S. leg of the tour in 2023, a fan-created online guessing game dubbed "Swiftball", inspired by fantasy football, began surging in popularity. Over 50,000 fans filled out virtual ballots ahead of each show to guess Swift's nightly "surprise songs" and costumes, with some also donating items to serve as prizes for the winners, such as Swift-themed bracelets, CDs, vinyls, and posters. In August 2023, fan-made app Swift Alert launched globally, receiving 800,000 downloads by July 2024. The app provides users with real-time updates on each Eras Tour show and includes popular game "Mastermind", similar to "Swiftball". "Mastermind" received 288,000 entries during Swift's Zurich show on July 9, 2024. American filmmaker M. Night Shyamalan conceived the screenplay for his 2024 film Trap after attending the Eras Tour.

=== Internet usage ===
Fans at the stadiums set new records for attendance and usage. At the show in Arlington, Texas, AT&T's network alone moved 28.9 terabytes of data during the busiest day of Swift's three-day tour stop at AT&T Stadium, according to data the carrier has shared exclusively with The Verge. The company estimates 1 TB of data represents about 200,000 photos or 400 hours of video moving across its network, the most data AT&T's network has moved at any stadium for any event that year. The 4.8 terabytes of data generated during her extremely rainy show at Gillette Stadium in Foxborough, Massachusetts was a record for that stadium as well. Her stop at US Bank Stadium in Minneapolis moved 6.6 terabytes of data on AT&T's network during its highest-traffic day, nearly 70 percent more volume than anything else over the past year. In Chicago, 7.2 TB of data was used at Soldier Field.

At Wembley Stadium in London, EE witnessed an unprecedented surge in data usage during the concert, setting new records. This surpassed the data usage at the 2024 UEFA Champions League final. Swifties broke Vodafone Portugal’s data traffic record with a staggering 4.8 TB on the second night, surpassing any association football game ever held at the stadium.

In Canada, Rogers Communications said fans who attended Swift's sold-out November 21 Eras Tour concert in Toronto set the new traffic record by streaming and sharing content on Rogers 5G network, using 7.4 terabytes (TB) of mobile data in just a few hours, a total of 5G data usage equivalent to streaming her entire discography 6,300 times, or to uploading 182,000 photos and 1,600 hours worth of streaming videos. Rogers said total of 42 TB of wireless data was used by Swifties at all six shows on the Rogers 5G network at Rogers Centre. The final concert of the tour in Vancouver's BC Place was watched online by millions; one fan-hosted live-stream from the venue was followed by another 389,000 people on YouTube.

== Crowd phenomena ==
The only thing I can compare [the Eras Tour] to is the phenomenon of Beatlemania.

— American musician Billy Joel, The New York Times

The fan frenzy associated with the tour has been dubbed "Swiftmania" or similar terms. The Irish Times held it responsible for "pushing up prices", leading to the Swiftflation phenomenon. Journalists considered Swiftmania as the 21st-century equivalent to Beatlemania, a 1960s cultural phenomenon owing to the fanaticism surrounding the English rock band the Beatles. Jon Bream of Star Tribune opined that Swift has achieved "a once unthinkable monoculture, a zeitgeistian redux of Beatlemania". Media outlets have noted the extensive audience participation on the Eras Tour, particularly the various "inside joke" chants and rituals that the crowds performed together at each show. Outlets also reported that many fans experienced a "post-concert amnesia", struggling to remember the concert after attending it. Psychologists explained that intensely happy emotions have the same effect on the brain as traumatic events, and can lead to loss of memory, as the "highly stimulating environment" of the show overwhelms the amount of information the brain can handle at a time. Proposing marriage during Swift's performance of "Love Story" also gained traction at the tour. Highly enthusiastic reactions from fans were reported at screenings of the tour's accompanying concert film.

=== Tailgating ===
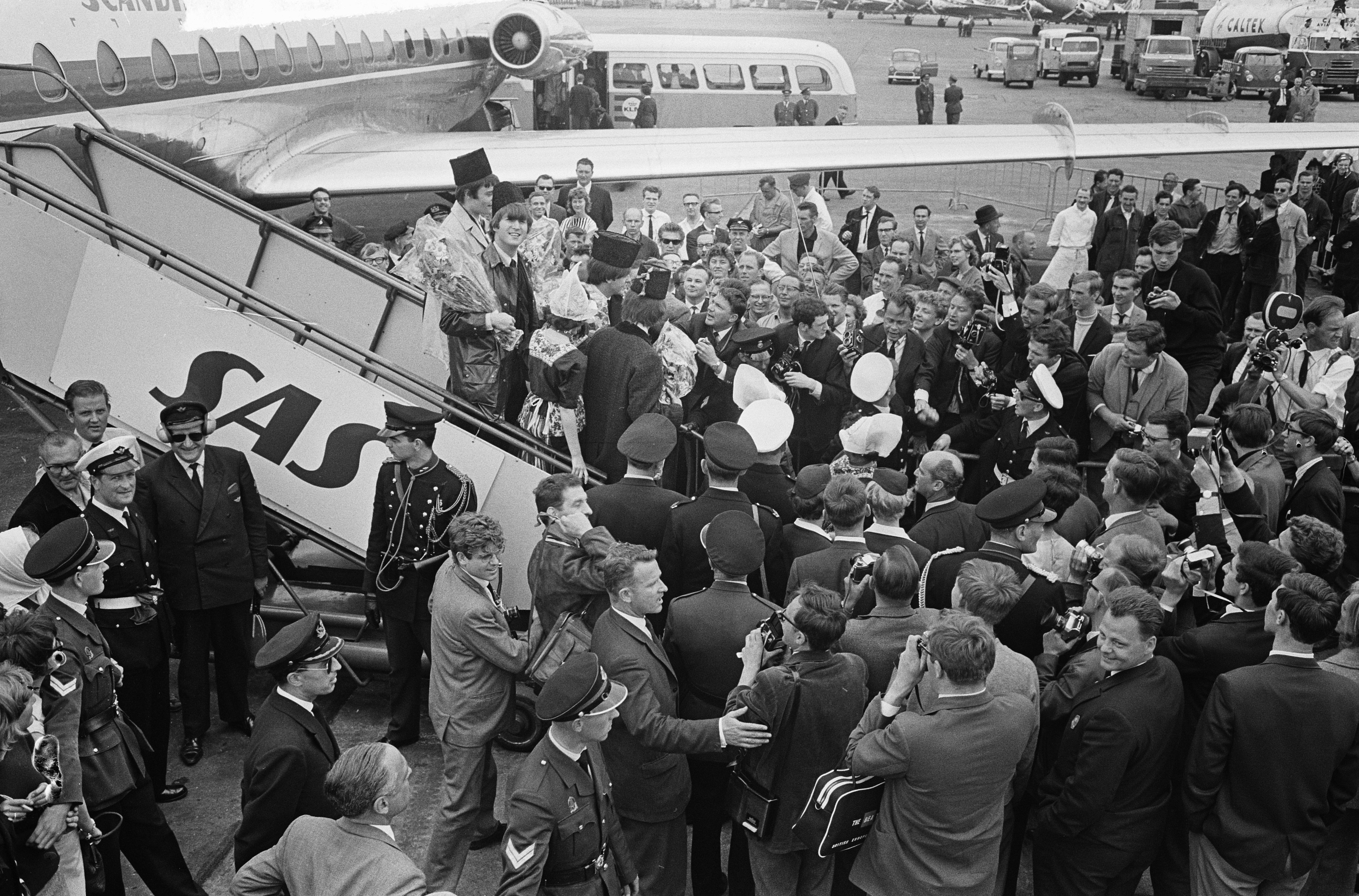
The Beatles swarmed by fans and media personnel in 1964 upon arrival in the Netherlands; the fan frenzy associated with the Eras Tour, dubbed Swiftmania, is considered the 21st-century equivalent to Beatlemania.

Large numbers of fans who did not have tickets to the Eras Tour gathered outside the venues in various cities to listen to Swift performing, a tailgate party phenomenon media outlets and fans termed "Taylor-gating". Charlotte Ivers of The Sunday Times opined, Swift conjured a global crowd phenomena with the tour that "may be less about music and more about feeling part of something." According to NBC News, such gatherings in open spaces outside the stadium premises have been attributed to a sense or experience of community within Swift's fandom. Thousands gathered in Tampa, Philadelphia and Nashville, among other cities, following which people "shared positive experiences" about Taylor-gating via TikTok, leading to growing crowds at subsequent shows. The Philadelphia shows attracted around 20,000 ticketless fans every night. In Chicago, fans occupied the public parks outside Soldier Field, where the concert was "clearly" audible. Cincinnati allocated adjacent park areas for the 41,000 Taylor-gaters. In Mexico City, stands outside the venue Foro Sol were opened for tailgaters. Thousands of fans also gathered outside the Melbourne Cricket Ground and Singapore National Stadium.

External videos
- Thousands of Taylor Swift fans watch concert for free on grassy hill in Munich – via The Daily Telegraph on YouTube.

In Munich, Germany, thousands watched the first concert at Olympiastadion for free by camping on the Olympiaberg Hill, a grassy elevated area overlooking the stadium, providing them a direct, bird's-eye view of the show; estimates of people gathered outside the stadium ranged from 25,000 to 50,000. As the practice grew in popularity, some cities and stadium authorities prohibited tailgating due to security reasons. New Jersey State Police issued a warning on May 26, 2023, asking those without tickets not to gather outside the concert venue in East Rutherford. Levi's Stadium, the venue for the Santa Clara concerts, similarly prohibited tailgating and asked fans not to congregate in the parking lots or nearby streets. Other cities that banned tailgating include Kansas City, Inglewood and Sydney. Following security concerns after the 2024 Vienna terrorism plot, the Wembley Stadium administration banned tailgaters for the tour's second set of London concerts.

Some companies hiring temporary workers or volunteers to work at venues reported a surge in applications from fans who could not get tickets to the Eras Tour, with one company receiving over 1,000 applications for 65 positions. In Buenos Aires, Argentina, fans with general admission tickets camped outside the concert venue, Estadio River Plate, in tents for five months to secure front-row positions on the floor during the shows. Before the accompanying concert film released in India, a group of Swifties in Bangalore took out a public march to get Swift to tour India. The fanfare was criticized by some Indian internet users, who dubbed the movement "embarrassing". In response, Indian Swifties on social media opined they were being unfairly "targeted for having fun", highlighting fanbases of Indian actors who have not being scrutinized similarly.

=== Merchandise ===
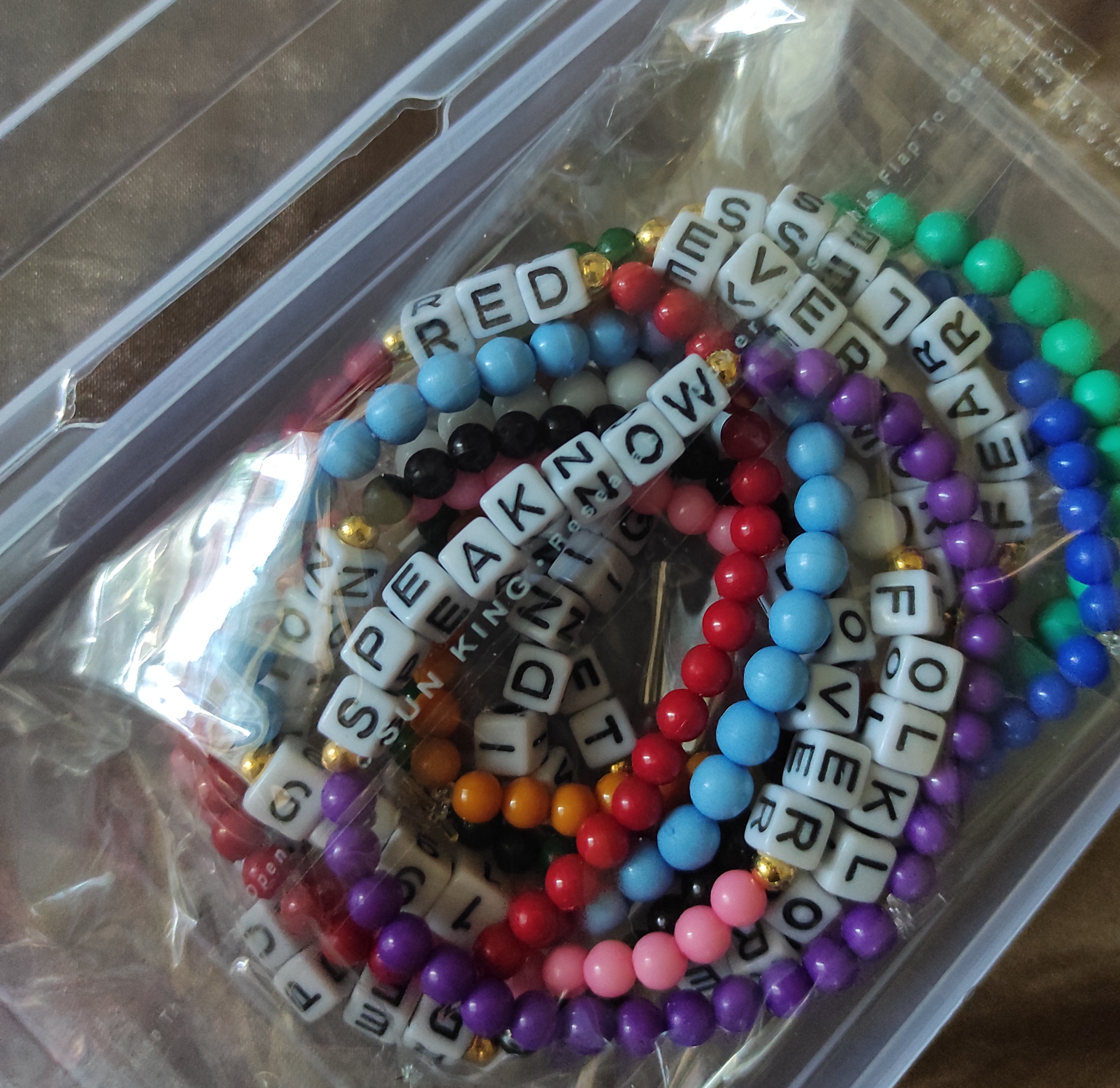
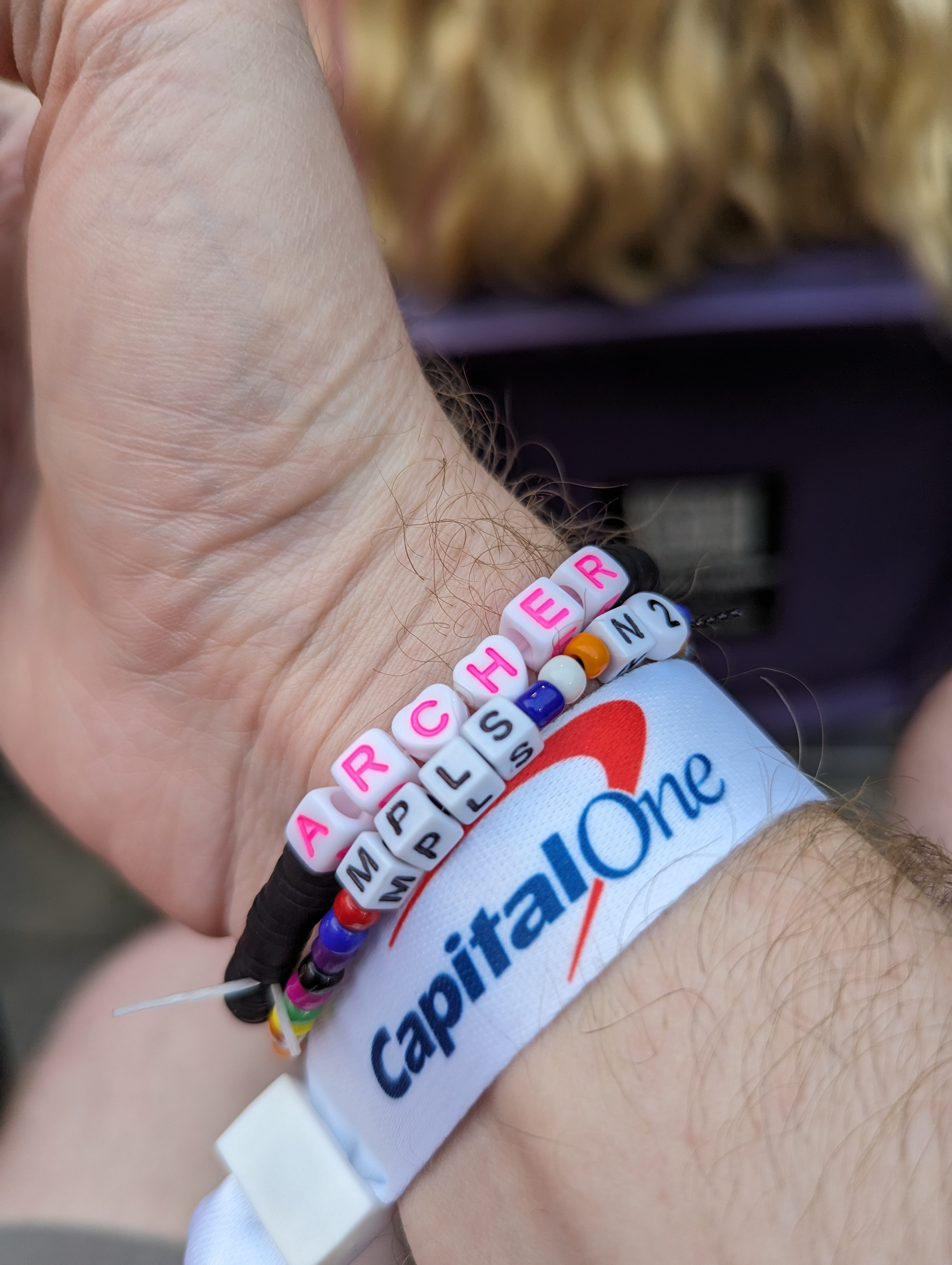
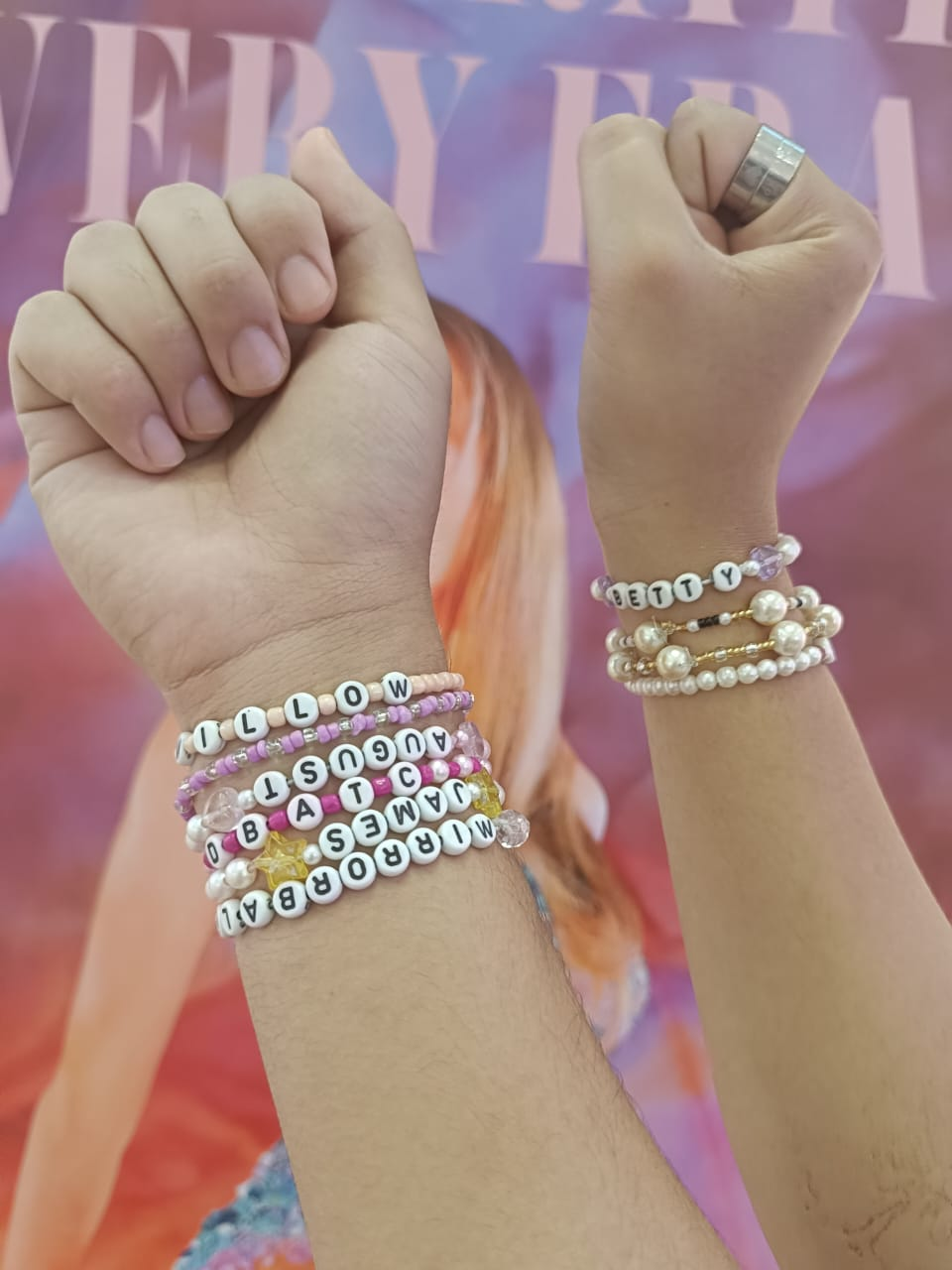
Some of the friendship bracelets circulated at the Eras Tour and the screenings of its concert film.

Concert attendees and Taylor-gating fans made friendship bracelets, carrying song titles or references to Swift's music and colloquialisms, to trade with each other or give to celebrity attendees, inspired by lyrics in Swift's 2022 song "You're on Your Own, Kid". The trend subsequently grew amongst celebrities, such as Kenyan-Mexican actress Lupita Nyong'o, who made and shared bracelets at the tour, and amongst attendees of events unrelated to Swift or the Eras Tour. Swift herself commented on the making and sharing of bracelets, which The New York Times dubbed the "badge of the Swiftie fandom".

The bracelets became a significant business for shops online; The Washington Post reported $3 million of bracelets were sold on e-commerce website Etsy between April and August of 2023. Some bead shops saw a record-setting surge in sales; arts and crafts supply store Michaels reported a chain-wide increase in sales of more than 40% on their jewelry range, and up to 500% in locations that the tour visited. Shortages in beads and sequins supply were also reported. Stores selling bracelet supplies in Australia and Canada also reported large increases in sales and shortages. Following Swift's endorsement of candidates Kamala Harris and Tim Walz in the 2024 US presidential election, the Harris-Walz campaign sold friendship bracelets.

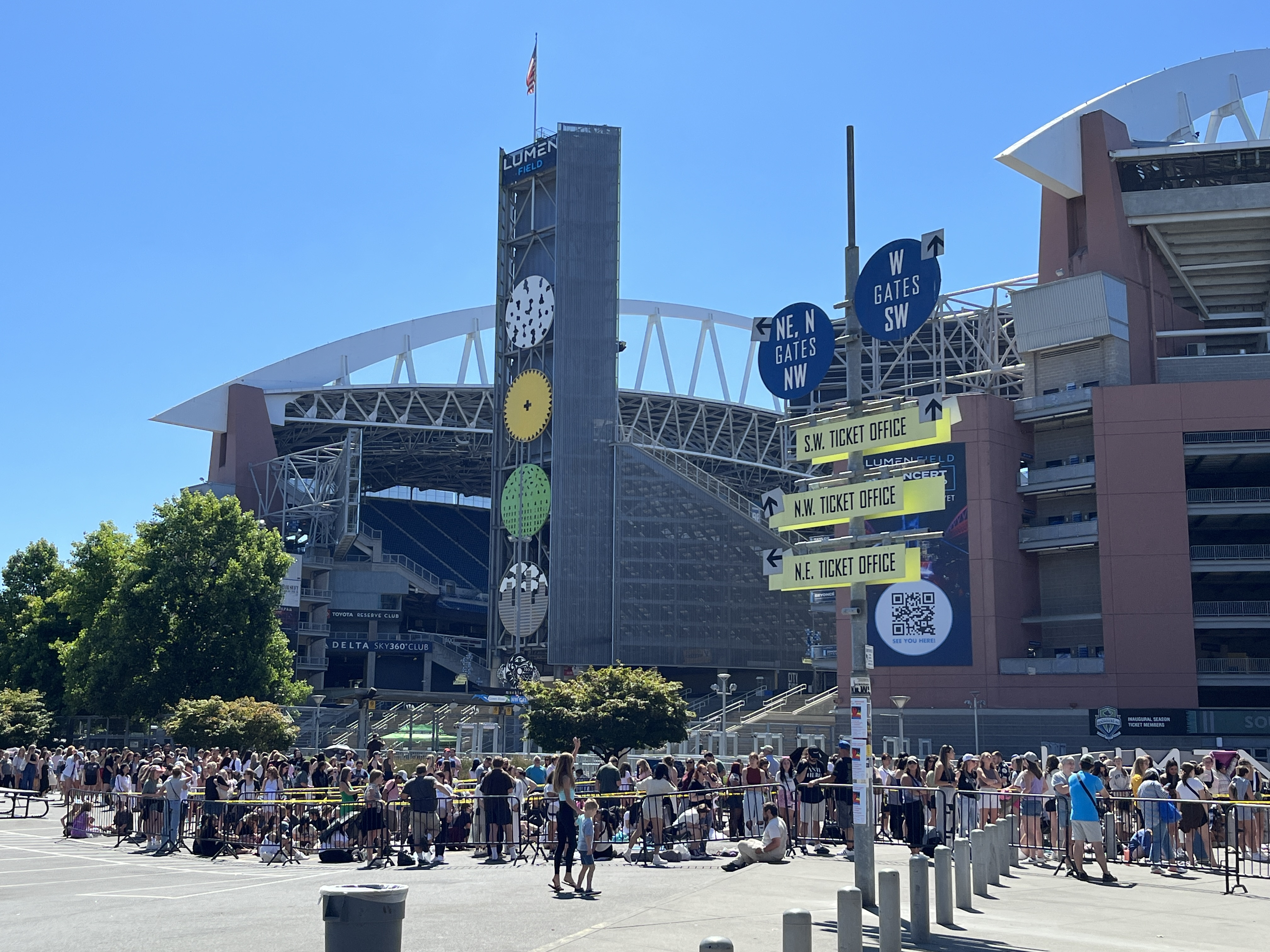
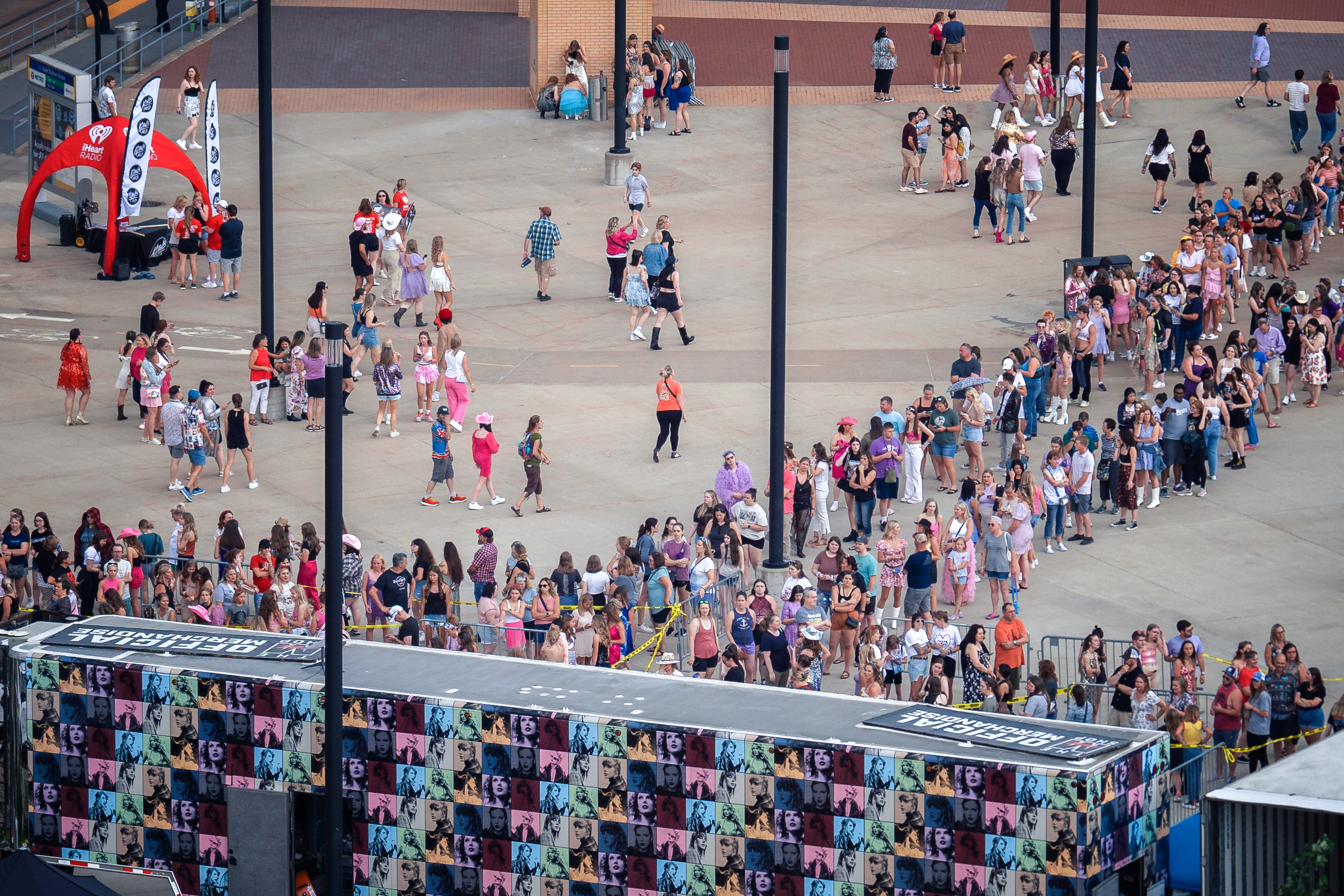
Portions of the long queues formed for the Eras Tour merchandise truck in the stadium premises in Seattle (top) and Minneapolis (below)

The Eras Tour merchandise trucks drew uncommonly long queues at all stops of the tour. The New York Times reported that hundreds of fans waited outside the Raymond James Stadium in Tampa, Florida, overnight in the rain to purchase the merchandise before it sold out. In Los Angeles, more than 3,000 fans queued for the merchandise stands outside SoFi Stadium. Fans in Edinburgh queued for several hours to purchase. The Wall Street Journal estimated that $3 million worth of merchandise is sold at every stop of the tour. According to Universal Music Group (UMG), the success of tour helped boost merchandising revenue by 12 percent, compensating the decline in touring revenue during the pandemic. Pollstar estimated the first 60 shows in 2023 collected $200 million in revenue from merchandise sales.

The Messenger reported that the confetti gathered from the Eras Tour evolved into its own niche market—being sold online at prices ranging from $10 to $200 on eBay and Facebook Marketplace—with some fans recouping full costs of their tickets in the process. Journalist Julia Gray wrote, "Confetti is like an extension of Swift's sought-after, limited-release merch. There's an element of scarcity and exclusivity."

=== Fashion ===
According to fashion critic Vanessa Friedman, Swift's wardrobe for the Eras Tour received wide press coverage. Tailors reported an increased demand for replicas of Swift's tour outfits. The tour increased the demand in sales of apparel like metallic boots and sequin dresses. According to CNN, fashion and clothing retailers across the United States are "carefully" marketing their products to actively target attendees of the Eras Tour. Companies such as Altar'd State, Bipty, and Hazel & Olive created a separate section of items inspired by Swift and her eras. Sales of rhinestone boots and cowboy hats also spiked, helping Hazel & Olive achieve its "biggest sales year yet." Vogue further noted the tour's impact on social media fashion, which used to only be a phenomenon of music festivals such as Coachella; many fans wore replicas of Swift's outfits or costumes based on her music to the concert. Shannon Aducci of Footwear News opined that Swifties at the Eras Tour shaped the direction of 2023 summer fashion.

=== Seismic activity ===
During the tour's stop in Seattle at Lumen Field on July 22 and 23, 2023, fans in the area caused seismic activity equivalent to a 2.3-magnitude earthquake, nicknamed the "Swift Quake". It was mostly attributed to the concert attendees jumping, dancing and cheering, as well as the loud sound system. According to Jackie Caplan-Auerbach, a seismologist at Western Washington University, the seismic activity on both nights was more than "twice as hard" as the Beast Quake—when Seattle experienced seismic activity equivalent to a 2.0-magnitude earthquake after the Seattle Seahawks scored a touchdown against the New Orleans Saints during a National Football League (NFL) game—as well as "RaveQuakes" during important Seattle Sounders FC soccer games. Researchers from the California Institute of Technology and the University of California, Los Angeles, also reported that fans caused "earthquake-like" tremors when the tour visited SoFi Stadium in Inglewood, in a study titled "Shake to the Beat: Exploring the Seismic Signals and Stadium Response of Concerts and Music Fans." A seismic activity of magnitude of 0.82 on the Richter scale was recorded in Lisbon, Portugal, on May 26, 2024, when Swift performed "Shake It Off". According to the British Geological Survey, seismic vibrations in Edinburgh peaked during "...Ready for It?" with an equivalent of 80 kW of power across a six-kilometer radius from Murrayfield Stadium.

== Music charts ==
This is the part about Taylor Swift's career that is unprecedented. She has, rather brilliantly, convinced the public that her past and present coexist right now. She's dismantled the former "new work vs. old work" binary for artists and replaced it with the "Eras" paradigm, where her songs are parceled into different concurrent channels that are equally accessible ... Swift has figured out how to reprogram the public's internal algorithm better than any of her competitors, so that her historical fame doesn't count against her contemporary fame. She gets to be a "legacy act" and a "relevant pop act" simultaneously.

— Critic Steven Hyden, Uproxx

Swift's discography gained in sales and streams following the Eras Tour. Billboard reported that Swift's entire discography rose in daily streams, especially the songs on the setlist. She ultimately became the year-end top artist of 2023 on the Billboard charts—the first-ever act to become the year-end top artist in three different decades (after 2009 and 2015). Swift was 2023's most streamed artist on Apple Music and Spotify; on Apple Music, she set an all-time record for the most listeners for any artist in a year. Swift was the most-streamed artist on Spotify for 2024 as well.

Seven of Swift's albums charted in the top 40 regions of the United States Billboard 200, making Swift the first living artist to do so. Midnights charted at number 3, Lover at number 13, Folklore at number 14, 1989 at number 19, Red (Taylor's Version) at number 22, Reputation at number 26, and Evermore at number 31. Whitney Houston was the first artist to chart seven albums in the top 40, but she did so posthumously. Several weeks later, Swift became the first artist to simultaneously chart eight albums in the top 40 and nine albums in the top 50, and after the release of Speak Now (Taylor's Version), became the first woman to chart four albums in the top 10 and 11 albums overall in a single week. Later in 2023, after the release of 1989 (Taylor's Version), she surpassed her own record by charting five albums in the top 10 of the Billboard 200, becoming the first living artist to achieve the feat. Luminate Data reports attributed 1.79 percent of the United States music market in 2023 to Swift alone, the largest annual share for an artist. The report claimed that if Swift were a genre, she would be the ninth most consumed genre of 2023, bigger than jazz entirely and trailing only behind Christian music.

Following the Australian ticket sales in June 2023, Swift charted six albums in the ARIA Albums Chart top 10, becoming the first artist to occupy the entire top five. In February 2024, as the Australian leg of the Eras Tour drew to a close, she surpassed her own record by charting seven albums in the top 10, including the entire top six. Following the opening shows of the Eras Tour, five of Swift's albums entered the top 40 of the UK Albums Chart. Swift occupied the top five positions of the Irish Albums Chart simultaneously following the three Dublin shows.

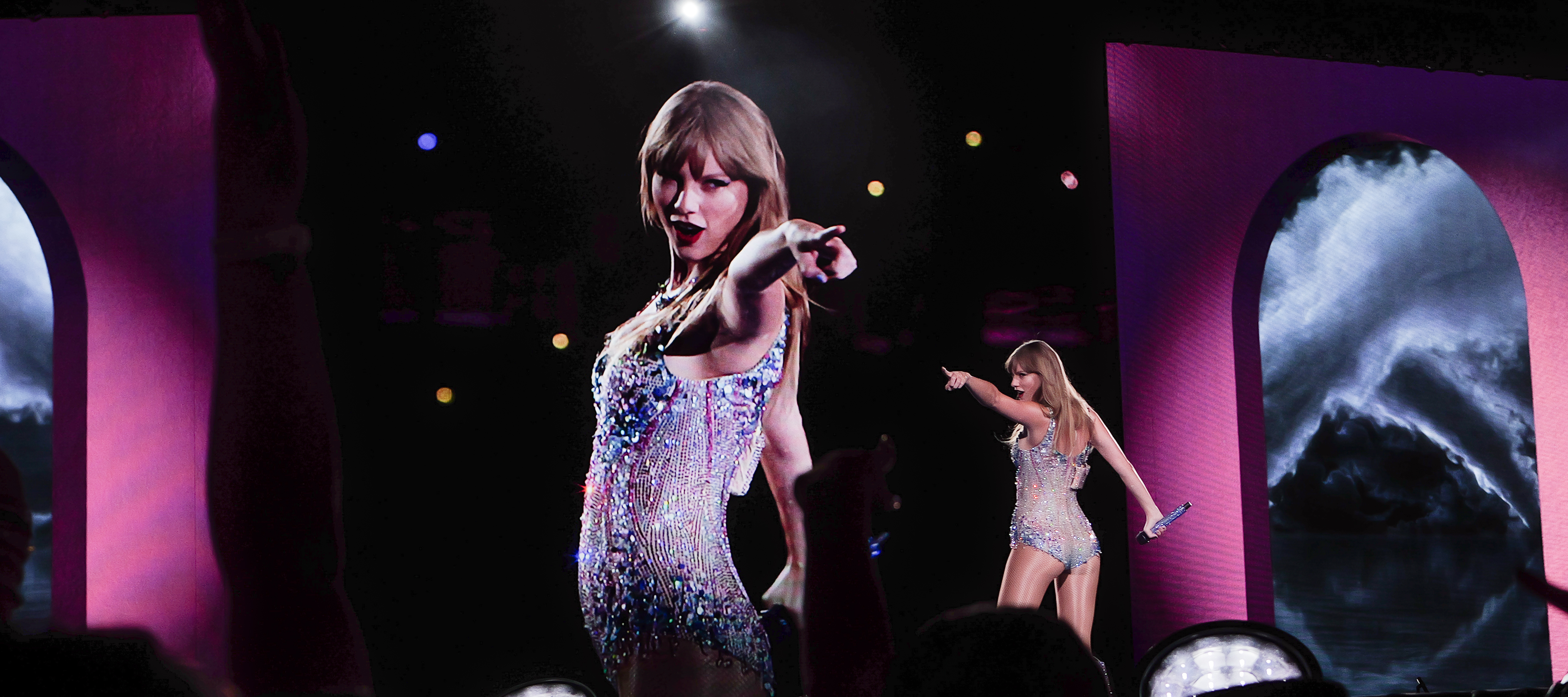
Swift performing "Cruel Summer" at the Eras Tour

Swift's 2019 song "Cruel Summer" achieved resurgent success in 2023. The Eras Tour concerts begin with the Lover act, in which "Cruel Summer" is the second song performed. The song resurged in popularity and streaming after it became viral on social media, re-entering the top 50 in the United States and the top 40 in the United Kingdom. Therefore, Swift's label Republic Records released the song as the fifth single from Lover, her seventh studio album from 2019, to US contemporary hit radio on June 20, 2023. "Cruel Summer" entered the singles charts for the first time in various countries and reached new peaks in Australia (1), Canada (1), the Philippines (1), Singapore (1), the US (1), the Global 200 (1), Japan (2), the UK (2), Indonesia (3), New Zealand (3), Malaysia (3), and Ireland (4). On Spotify, "Cruel Summer" was the sixth most-streamed song globally in 2023, and Lover was the seventh most-streamed album globally in 2023. Swift's 2014 single "Blank Space" also re-entered the Hot 100 (49). Billboard's Andrew Unterberger wrote, the "really unprecedented thing" about the Eras Tour's streaming impact is that "the initial bump did not start receding back to its usual sea after a week or two [as with the case of artists than Swift]—it continued to grow. And grow." He reported that even at the tenth week of the tour, Swift's discography showed a 79% increase in streams from where it was pre-tour, amassing "hundreds of millions more streams" weekly. Commenting on the resurgent success of "Cruel Summer", Billboard editor Jason Lipshutz stated, "a Lover track organically rising to new heights at the same time simply demonstrates Swift's current ubiquity, unprecedented in the modern music era."

== Cinema ==
Swift announced the tour's first concert film, Taylor Swift: The Eras Tour, on August 31, 2023. North American tickets went on sale immediately, and despite AMC Theatres, the film's official distributor, upgrading its online infrastructure in anticipation of high demand for presale tickets, the app crashed, forcing customers into queues. The film collected $37 million in first-day presales in the United States and earned $123 million globally in its opening week, a record among concert films. IMAX Corporation CEO Richard Gelfond told CNBC that the presale figures were comparable to those of a "blockbuster tentpole feature". The film was released on October 13, 2023, and several films that shared the same release date moved out of it to avoid competing with The Eras Tour, including The Exorcist: Believer.

The film became the highest-grossing concert film of all time. Various journalists opined that it was released in a crucial time for movie theaters and would boost their earnings after the business was widely affected by the then-ongoing Writers Guild of America and SAG-AFTRA strikes. Michael O'Leary, president of the National Association of Theatre Owners, believed the success of The Eras Tour was a testament to the unrealized potential of concert films in theaters. It was reported that Hollywood executives were irked with Swift's surprise announcement of the film as she had directly and secretly negotiated with AMC to distribute the film in theaters, bypassing major film studios and their streaming services. The Daily Telegraph's Ed Power praised Swift's business sense and decision to release the film to the fury of the studios, writing: "Barbenheimer showed people will go to the cinema if they feel they are participating in a communal experience. Hollywood refused to take advantage of this. So Swift has instead." Inc. columnist Jason Aten said Swift could be "the world's savviest marketer" as she "seems to have figured out [release strategies] far better than most studio executives". Others opined The Eras Tour's success could affect the conventional producer–distributor–exhibitor structure of film releases.

A second concert film, Taylor Swift: The Eras Tour: The Final Show, was released on December 12, 2025, through Disney+. Directed by Glenn Weiss, it was filmed at the tour's final show in Vancouver and features performances of songs from The Tortured Poets Department. The additional songs were added to the set list following the April 2024 release of the album.

== Honors ==
City administrations, companies and other organizations celebrated the Eras Tour with various tributes.

=== Governments ===
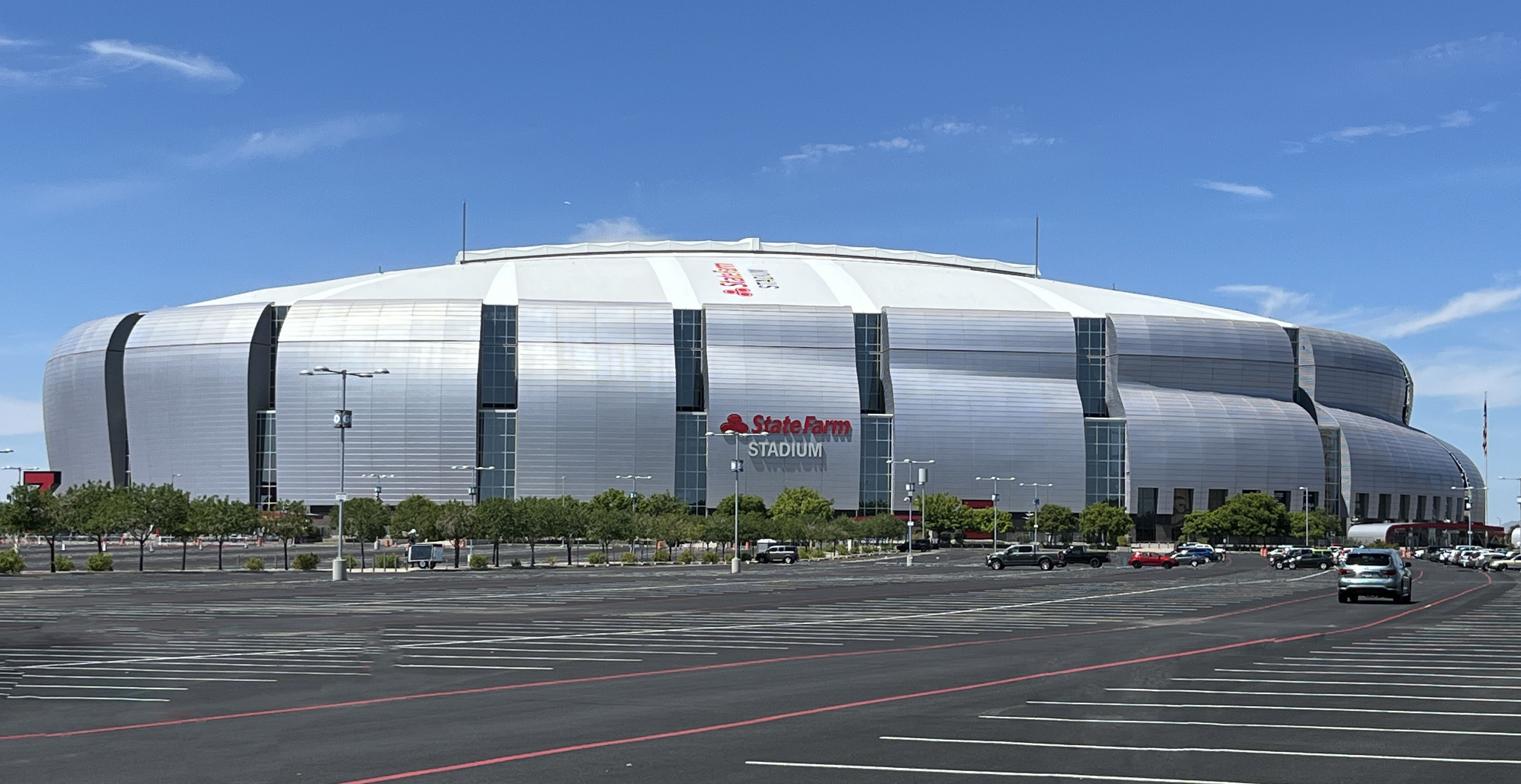
State Farm Stadium in Glendale, Arizona, hosted the first show of the tour; Glendale renamed itself as Swift City to honor the tour, starting the trend of host cities paying tribute to Swift.

- Glendale changed its name from March 17 to 18 as it hosted the first shows of the Eras Tour. Mayor Jerry Weiers announced the "symbolic" name, Swift City, on March 13. The Westgate Entertainment District, a mixed-use complex in Glendale, put up welcome messages. The Arizona Department of Transportation also displayed a number of Swift-themed messages along freeways.
- Las Vegas displayed light shows inspired by the color palettes of the Eras Tour every night through March 25 at the Gateway Arches on Las Vegas Boulevard.
- Arlington, Texas renamed Randol Mill Road, a street outside AT&T Stadium, to Taylor Swift Way on March 30. Mayor Jim Ross declared March 31 through April 2 "Taylor Swift Weekend", during which the steel sculptures outside the City Hall were lit red in reference to Red; Swift was also presented with a key to the city.

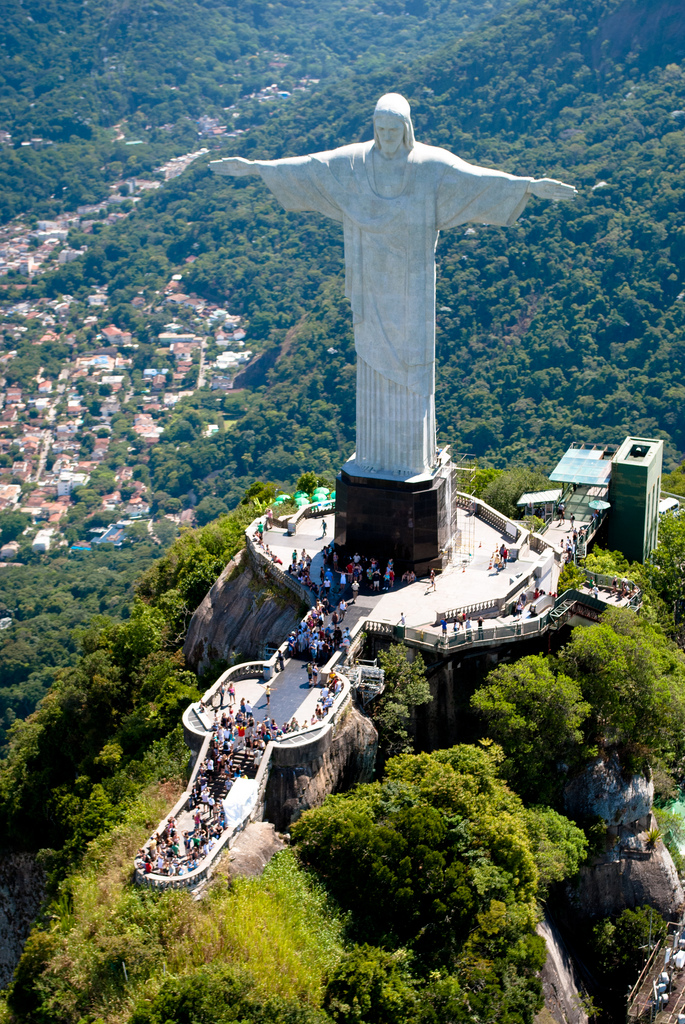
Rio de Janeiro welcomed the Eras Tour to Brazil by decorating the statue of Christ the Redeemer (pictured) with a Swift-inspired light projection.

- Tampa presented Swift with a key to the city; Mayor Jane Castor invited Swift to be the city's honorary mayor for a day. Tampa City Hall, Tampa Riverwalk, and downtown bridges were lit red. Hillsborough County temporarily changed its name to Swiftsborough.
- Houston illuminated its city hall lavender as a nod to "Lavender Haze", celebrated "The Eras Tour weekend", and renamed NRG Stadium to NRG Stadium (Taylor's Version) from April 21 to 23, per a proclamation by Harris County judge Lina Hidalgo.
- Taylorsville, Georgia declared April 28, 2023 "Taylor Swift Day" and presented Swift with a key to the city following her sold-out shows at Mercedes-Benz Stadium.
- Nashville mayor John Cooper recognized May 5 to 7 as "Taylor Swift Homecoming Weekend" and placed an "honorary bench" at Centennial Park as a monument dedicated to "Nashville and Swift's long-standing relationship", in reference to lyrics in "Invisible String".
- Philadelphia unveiled a mural on South Street on May 12.
- Massachusetts governor Maura Healey conferred a "Governor's Citation" upon Swift ahead of the Foxborough shows.
- New Jersey governor Phil Murphy declared the "Taylor Swift ham, egg, and cheese" as the state's official sandwich on May 25, referencing the cultural debate about Taylor ham and pork roll.
- Michigan governor Gretchen Whitmer welcomed Swift to the state for the Detroit shows by posting a video speech on Twitter referencing several of her songs.
- Pittsburgh mayor Ed Gainey renamed the city Swiftsburgh for the weekend. In December 2023, the Pennsylvania General Assembly passed a resolution to recognize 2023 as "the Taylor Swift era" in Pennsylvania, her home state.
- Minneapolis mayor Jacob Frey temporarily renamed the city Swiftieapolis. Minnesota governor Tim Walz proclaimed June 23 and 24 as "Taylor Swift Days" in the state.
- Cincinnati mayor Aftab Pureval proclaimed June 30 as "Taylor Swift Day" in the city. Hamilton County, Ohio, renamed itself Hamilton County (Taylor's Version). Bellevue, Kentucky, renamed Taylor Avenue to Taylor Swift Avenue.
- Downtown Kansas City was lit purple in reference to Speak Now (Taylor's Version). North Kansas City, Missouri, renamed Swift Street to Swift Street (Taylor's Version); Ray County, Missouri, installed a crop art.
- Colorado governor Jared Polis wrote Swift a letter containing references to her songs and lyrics ahead of the Denver shows.
- The Washington State Department of Natural Resources named Swift an "Honorary Geologist".
- Santa Clara renamed itself Swiftie Clara and proclaimed Swift as its honorary mayor from July 28 to 29.
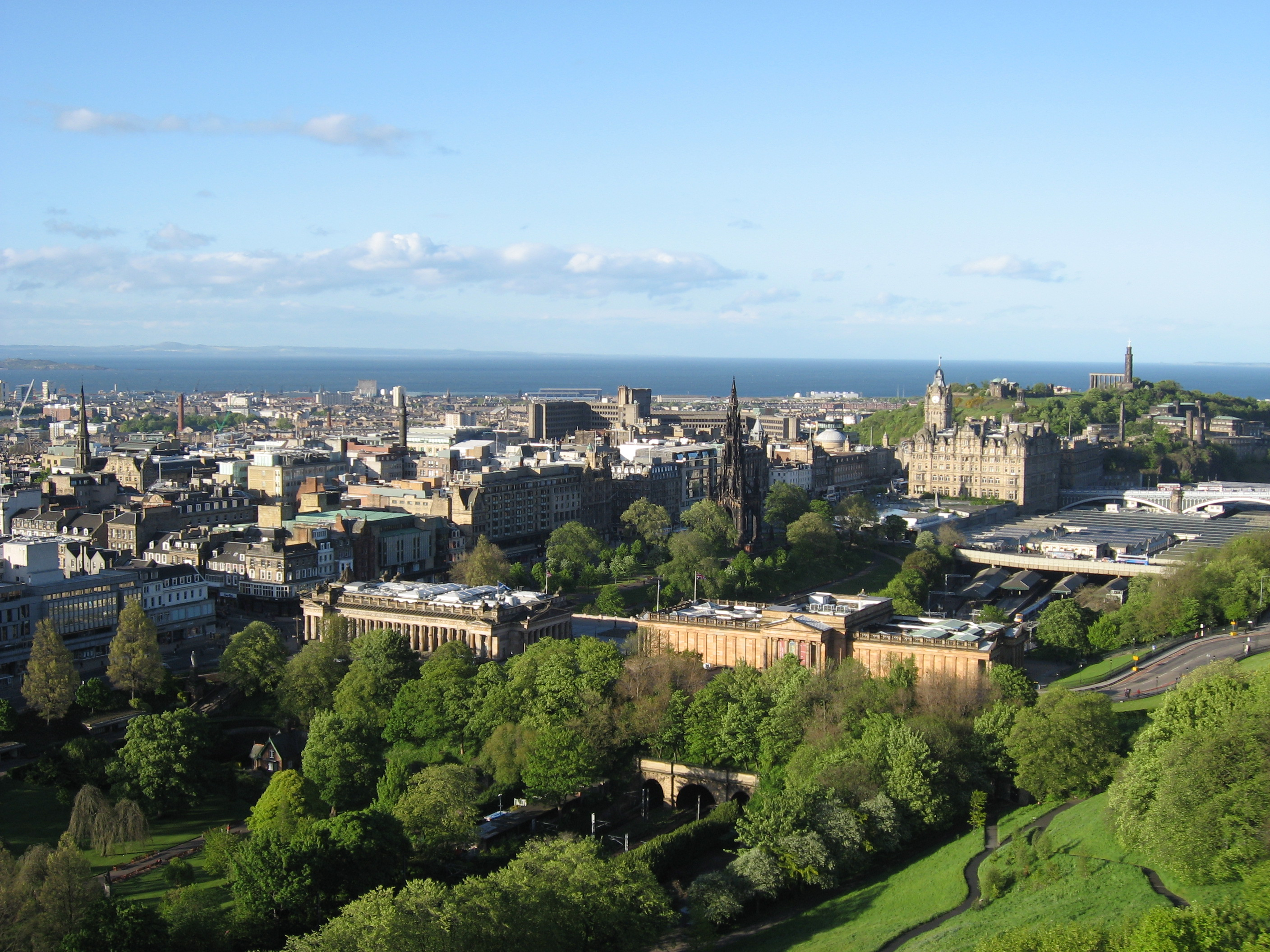
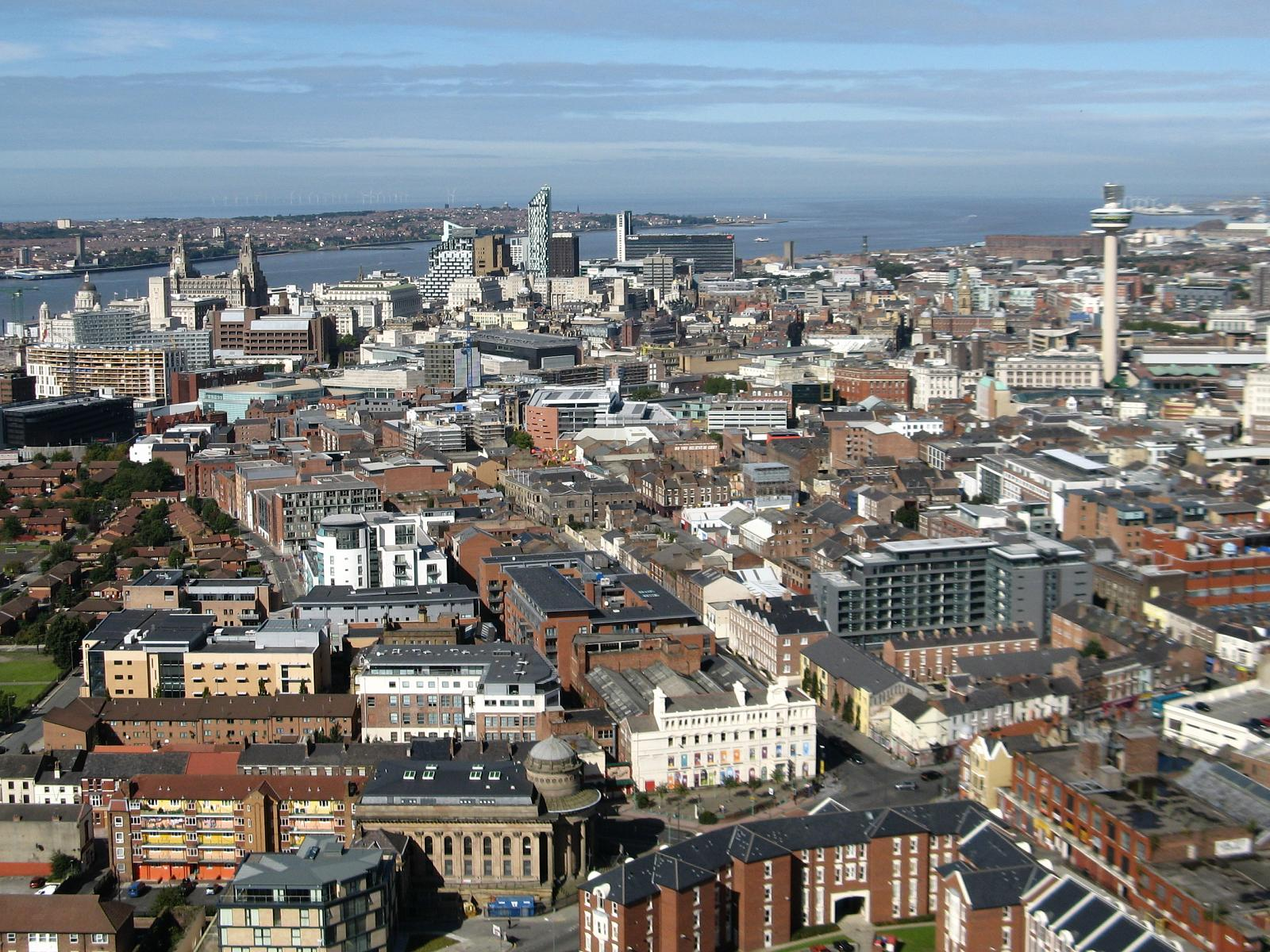
Local cultural agencies in Edinburgh (top), Scotland, and Liverpool (bottom), England, sprinkled art installations inspired by Swift's musical eras throughout the cities.
- The Hawthorne/Lennox station and Downtown Inglewood stations, the closest Los Angeles Metro stations to SoFi Stadium, were renamed to Taylor Nation Station and Speak Now/Taylor's Station, respectively during the six shows.
- In Mexico City, Avenida Presidente Masaryk and Foro Sol were renamed to Avenida Taylor's Version and Foro 1989 Taylor's Version, respectively.
- The Buenos Aires City Legislature designated Swift a "Guest of Honor".
- Rio de Janeiro mayor Eduardo Paes sanctioned an homage to Swift—the phrase "Welcome to Brasil" and the names of all 26 Brazilian states on a T-shirt similar to the one she wore in the music video for "You Belong with Me" (2009)—to be projected on the statue of Christ the Redeemer after fans donated 20,000 units of panettone and water bottles as part of a fundraiser to support local charities.
- São Paulo illuminated its city hall, Pátio do Colégio, Mário de Andrade Library, Viaduto do Chá and the Monument to the Bandeiras sculpture with colors inspired by the Eras Tour.
- The US Department of State's Bureau of Consular Affairs issued an Eras Tour-themed travel advisory ahead of the first 2024 shows.
- The Japanese Embassy in Washington, D.C., issued an official statement about the Tokyo shows, referencing several of Swift's albums, to address speculation around her travel plans, as the Tokyo shows, the 66th Annual Grammy Awards in Los Angeles, and Super Bowl LVIII in Las Vegas all fell in the same week. Swift was ultimately present for all three events.
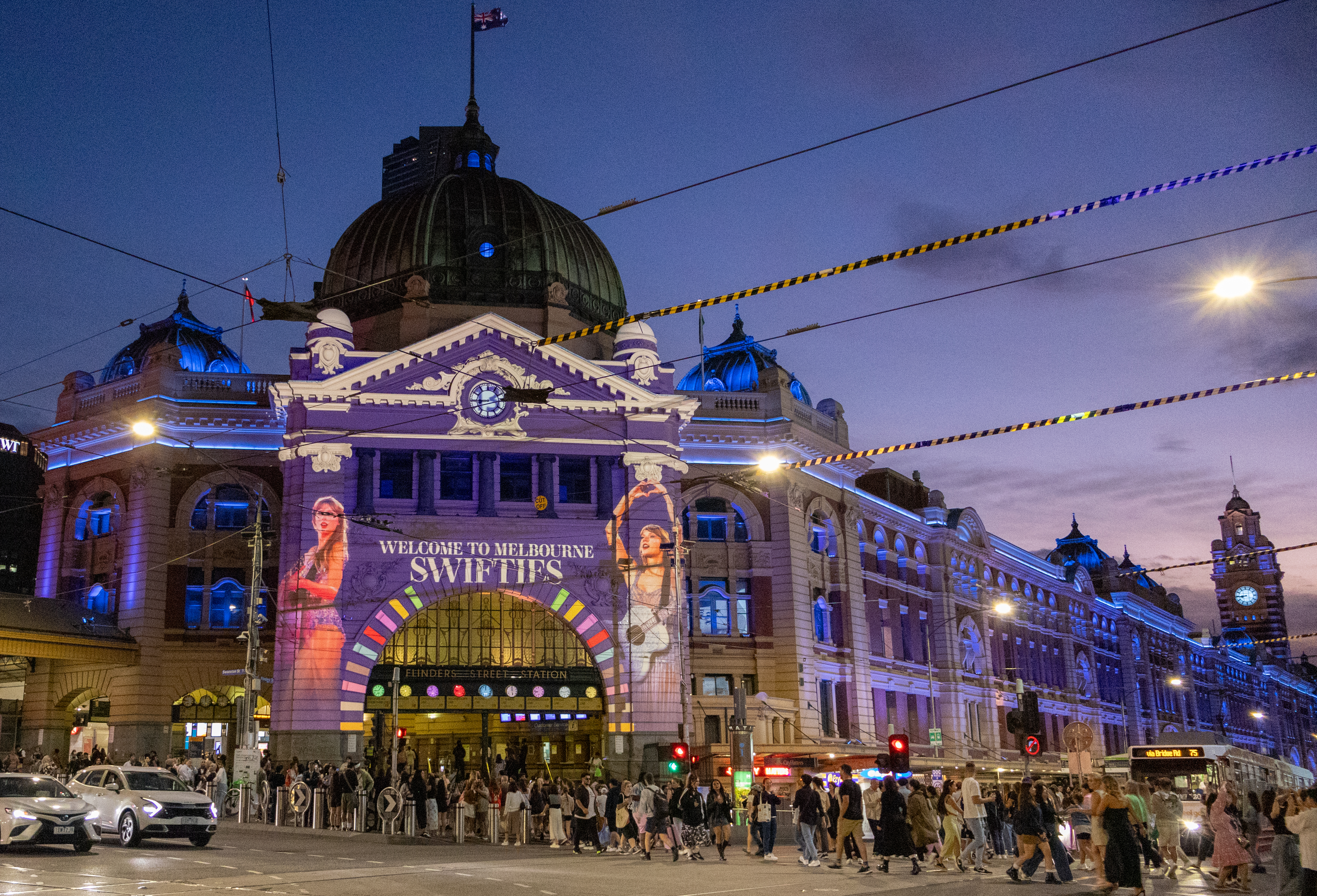
- Melbourne in preparation for its Eras Tour concerts
  In Melbourne, the state tourism body Visit Victoria commissioned images of Swift to be projected at the Flinders Street railway station.
- Sydney Trains lit the Central Station clock tower and Grand Concourse purple and operated "Tay Tay Express" train services to Olympic Park Station, which played several of Swift's songs onboard.
- Stockholm was temporarily renamed Swiftholm for Swift's three sold-out shows in the city.
- Edinburgh created a series of Swift-themed activities and experiences called the Taylored Taste Trail. Edinburgh Trams bore The Tortured Poets Department-inspired designs, Edinburgh Castle projected an image of The Tortured Poets Department, and Loch Tay was renamed Loch Tay Tay.
- Liverpool launched "Taylor Town", consisting of various cultural experiences throughout the city to honor Swift, including a series of art installations and craft workshops and an academic conference dedicated to her social impact. According to The Guardian, the city administration planned the event for nine months after the success of Eurovision 2023.
- The Mayor of London, Sadiq Khan, announced that Transport for London created a special subway map in honor of Swift, with the tourism body Visit London launching a "Taylor trail" to "celebrate places across the capital that are referenced in her music". "Shake It Off" (2014) was performed at the Buckingham Palace during a formal Changing the Guard ceremony; the British royal family's official Instagram account posted a video of the performance.

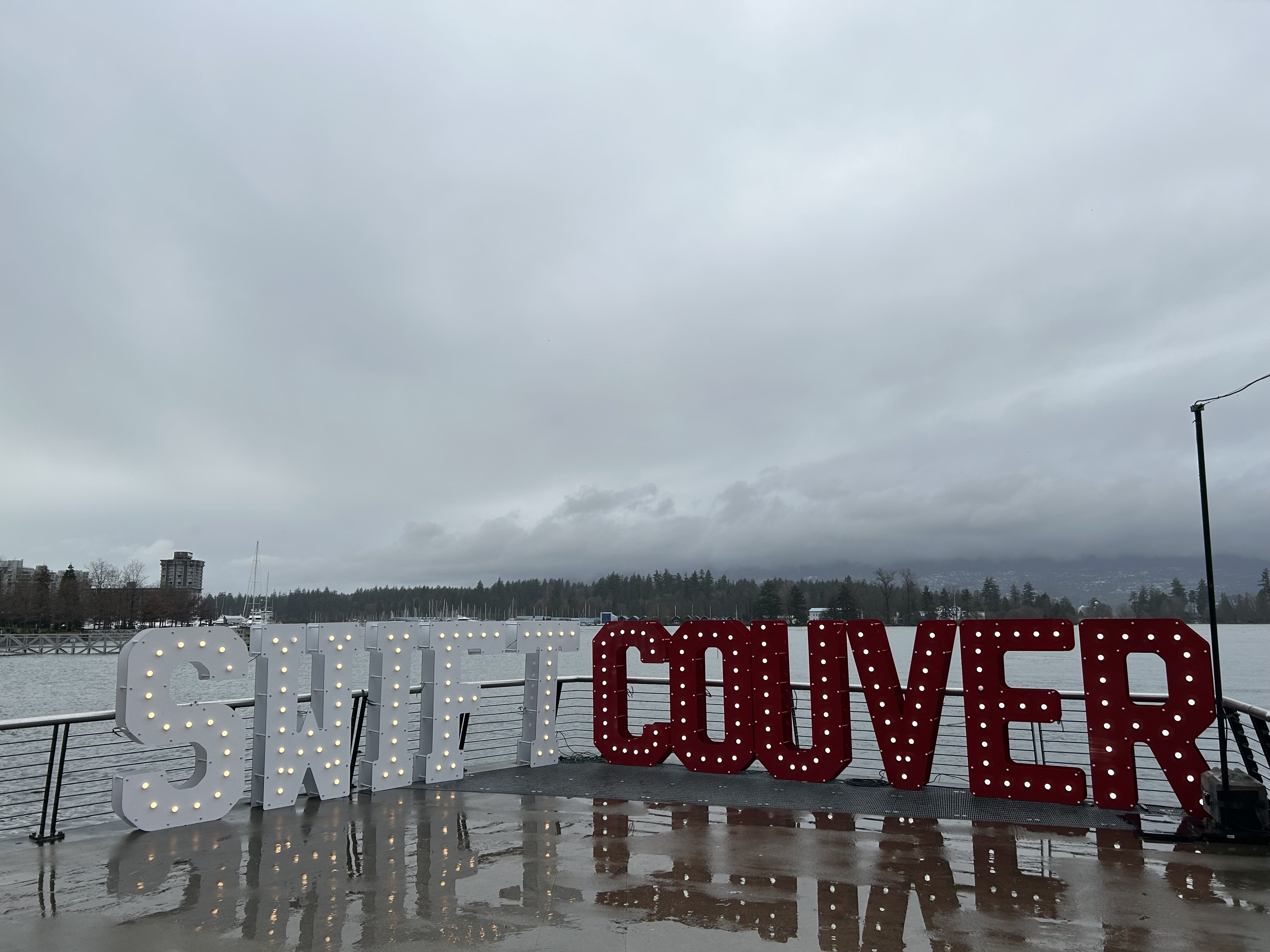
Swift themed signs and posters were installed throughout Vancouver in anticipation of the shows in the city.

- The Garda Band of the Garda Síochána, Ireland's national police force, performed "Shake It Off" for the public in Dublin.
- The Zurich tourism body Visit Zurich created a video matching Swift's eras to locations throughout the city.
- Gelsenkirchen was temporarily renamed Swiftkirchen by Mayor Karin Welge. Swift received a special stone on the Gelsenkirchen Walk of Fame.
- British rock band Coldplay and American singer Maggie Rogers performed covers of "Love Story", "Shake It Off" and "The 1" at their four Vienna shows during the Music of the Spheres World Tour as a tribute to Swift's canceled dates.
- In Indianapolis, 32 Swift-themed street signs were installed. Joe Hogsett, mayor of Indianapolis, issued a proclamation declaring November 1–3 as the Taylor Swift Weekend.
- Toronto temporarily renamed a route outside Rogers Centre to "Taylor Swift Way", unveiling 22 ceremonial street signs to be donated to the Daily Bread Food Bank at the end of November to raise money at auctions.
- Vancouver's official tourism organization, Destination Vancouver, installed 13 Swift-themed signs throughout the city in a scavenger hunt.

=== Organizations and companies ===
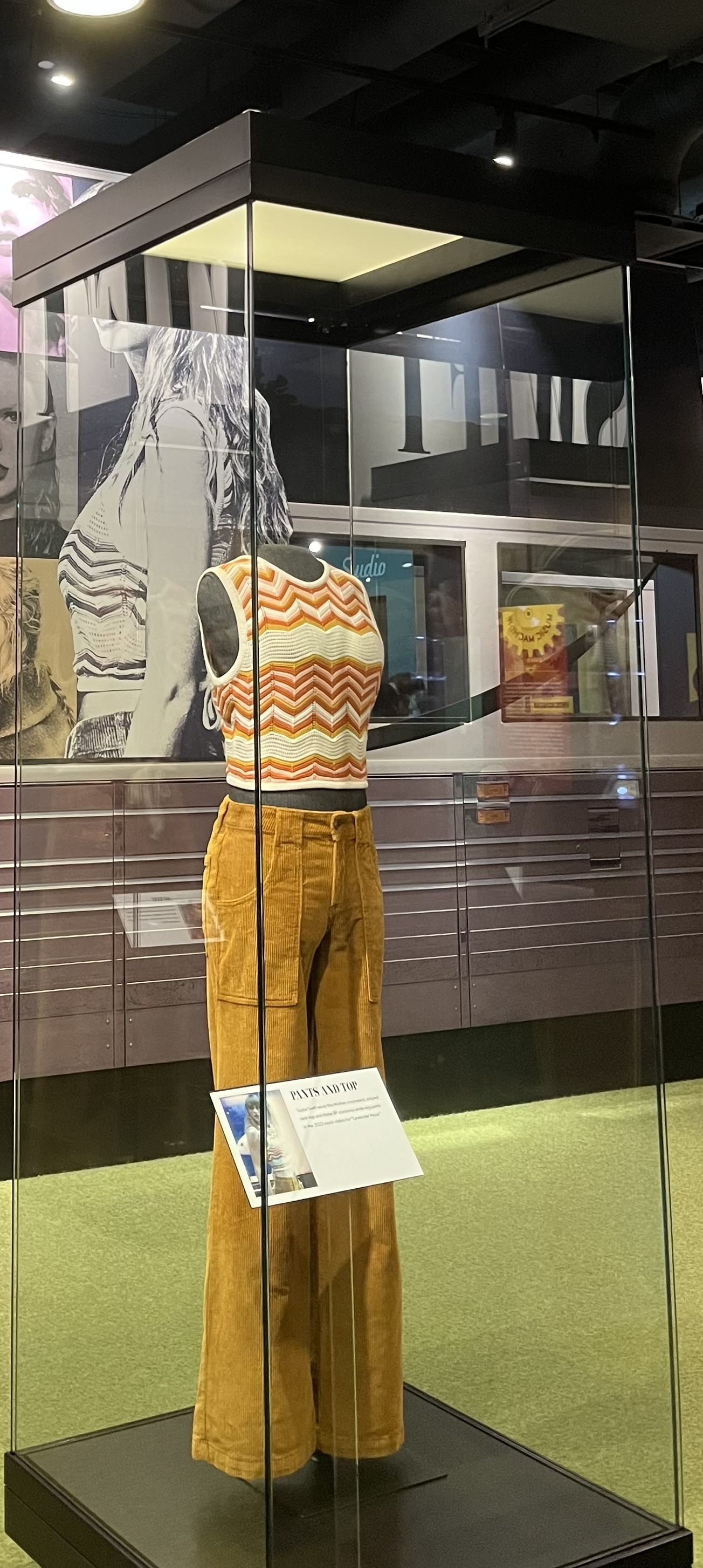
The Eras Tour inspired many exhibitions. Pictured is the showcase of an outfit Swift wore in the "Lavender Haze" music video at a Nashville exhibition.

- In Atlanta, Georgia's Own Credit Union welcomed Swift with a large "Welcome to A-TAY-L" sign displayed atop its skyscraper building.
- The Arlington Museum of Art announced an exhibit exploring Swift's "evolving, boundary-pushing" artistry, featuring costumes, photographs, and concert videos from her album eras. Titled The Eras Tour Collection, the exhibit ran from June 2 to September 24, 2023.
- Chicago's Willis Tower lit up its antennas in the colors of the Eras Tour.
- The Country Music Hall of Fame and Museum opened an exhibit titled Through Taylor Swift's Eras, displaying original outfits from every album era, throughout May 2023. Over 114,000 people bought tickets to the exhibit in May alone—the highest monthly attendance in the museum's 65-year history.
- Radio station 96.5 WTDY-FM temporarily renamed itself to "Ninety-Swift-Five T-A-Y".
- New York City's Museum of Arts and Design opened the exhibit Taylor Swift: Storyteller, a "career-spanning look at [Swift's] artistic reinventions", from May 20, 2023, to March 24, 2024. Circle Line Sightseeing Cruises offered a Swift-themed dance cruise on Hudson River ahead of the Eras Tour in East Rutherford.
- Cincinnati Zoo and Botanical Garden hosted a "Swiftie Weekend".

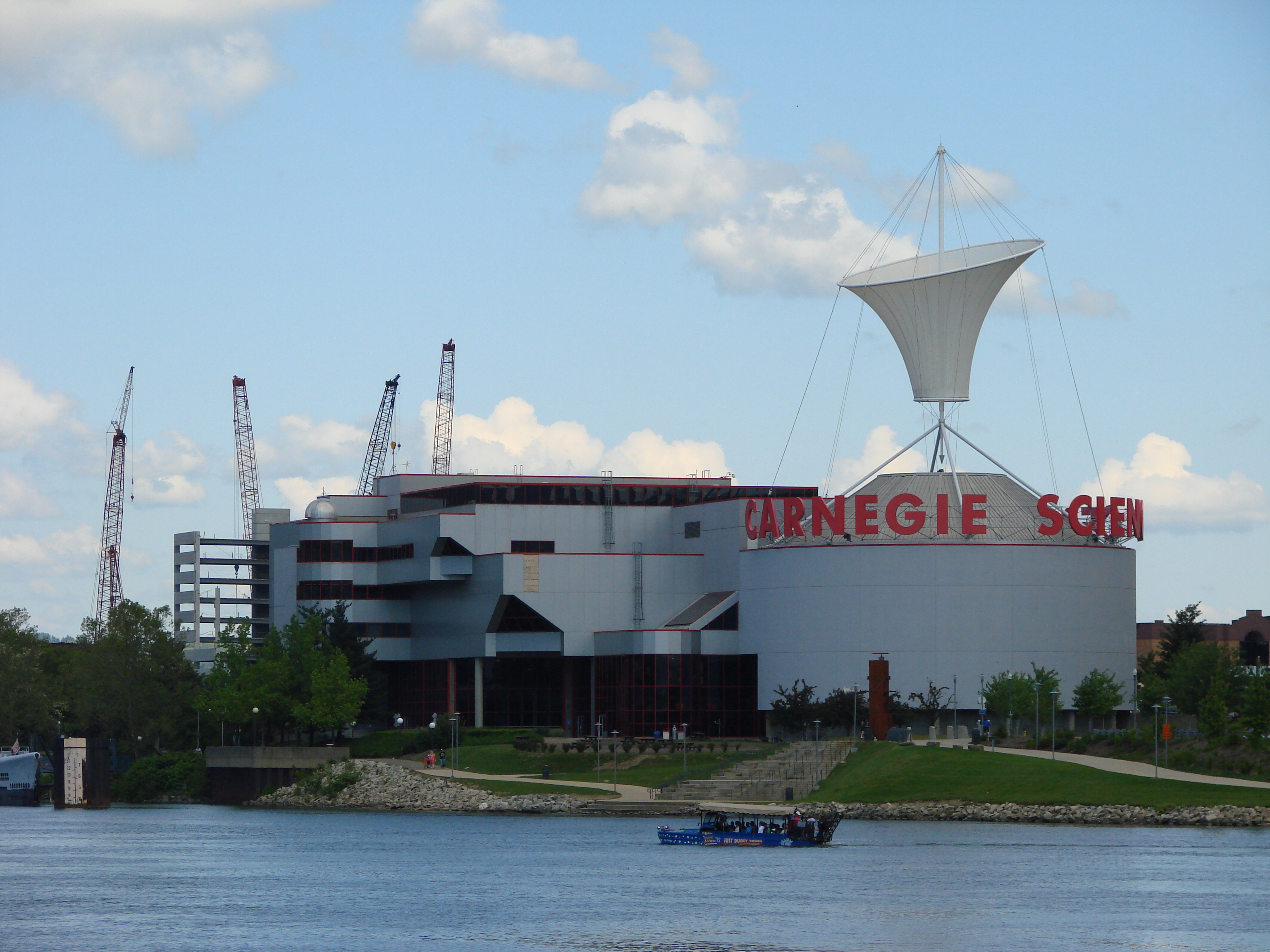
Various organizations hosted Swift-themed events and activities. The Carnegie Science Center (pictured) hosted a scavenger hunt of Eras Tour-themed objects.

- In Pittsburgh, the Gateway Clipper Fleet threw Swift-themed parties for passengers. The Carnegie Science Center organized an Eras Tour-themed scavenger hunt of miniature Swift dolls hidden throughout the Miniature Railroad and Village exhibition on June 16 and 17, and the Buhl Planetarium hosted a Swift-themed laser show.
- In Los Angeles, the Grammy Museum at L.A. Live opened a pop-up exhibit from August 2 to September 18, featuring 13 costumes and instruments from Swift's original Speak Now era and later seen in the "I Can See You" music video.
- Spotify launched a feature that uses listener's streaming data to list their "top five Taylor Swift eras". Recognizing Swift's singular achievements, the Apple Music Awards honored with a special event called Taylor Swift's Eras: The Experience.
- In honor of the completion of the first US leg of the Eras Tour, Starbucks stores across the United States played her music all day during the last day of the leg (August 9, 2023).
- Air New Zealand added special seats for those attending the tour in Australia, renaming one of the flights "NZ1989" in reference to the album of the same name. Philippine carrier Cebu Pacific also changed the flight numbers of its Singapore-bound planes to "1989".
- A Royal Caribbean International cruise trip from Miami to the Bahamas, titled In My Era Cruise, has been scheduled on October 21, a day after the tour's final date in Miami.
- A number of media publications bestowed Swift with year-end honorifics. Time named Swift their 2023 Person of the Year, an annual title given to a person, group, object, or idea that dominated the year culturally. Consequence named her their 2023 Artist of the Year, while The New York Times and The Guardian declared 2023 "the year of Taylor Swift". Billboard placed her atop their list of the greatest pop stars of 2023.

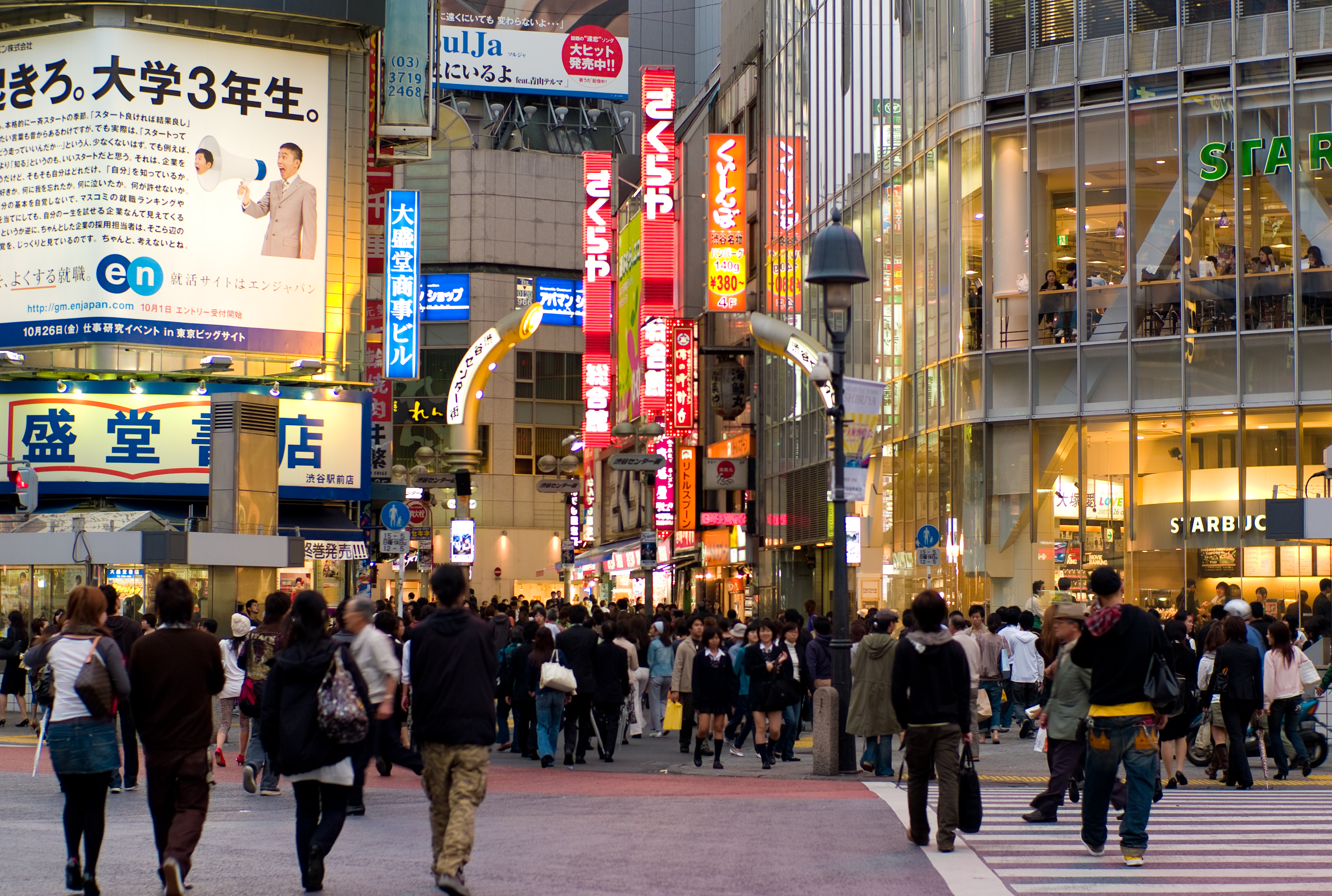
Center Gai in Shibuya, Tokyo, was temporarily renamed to honor Swift's four sold-out shows in the city.

- Center Gai, a commercial street in Shibuya, Tokyo, temporarily renamed itself Shibuya Center Gai (Taylor's Version) from February 7 to 20, displaying flags featuring Swift's albums and playing her music.
- In Sydney, several stadiums were lit purple in reference to "Lavender Haze". Sydney Airport displayed billboards welcoming fans into the city. Numerous businesses in the city hosted Swift-themed events.
- JW Marriott Indianapolis honoring Swift in downtown Indianapolis
  In Singapore, Jewel Changi Airport organized a Swift-themed sing-along event for fans on March 1, 2024. Marina Bay Sands staged an immersive experience called The Eras Tour Trail and a tour-themed light-and-water show.
- Although China was not part of the tour, Chinese video platform Bilibili hosted multiple events in celebration of the Singapore shows, including user-uploaded video themes inspired by Swift and the Eras Tour, the chance to win tickets to and a round-trip flight for the shows, and a livestream covered Swift's discography, music video, and talk with the platform's top music category creators.
- An augmented reality animation showing friendship bracelets falling onto the Eiffel Tower was created prior to Swift's shows in Paris.
- Capital UK launched a pop-up radio station dedicated to Swift, Capital (Taylor's Version), marking "the first time in the United Kingdom that a national DAB radio station has been dedicated to a single artist".
- The Edinburgh Zoo named two of its newborn tamarins, an endangered species, "Taylor" and "Swift".
- BBC Wales presented a weather forecast referencing Swift's discography the day before the Cardiff show.
- Wembley Park commissioned two murals of Swift to be painted at the Spanish Steps, temporarily renamed the Swiftie Steps, ahead of Swift's first three shows at Wembley Stadium. Whereas, the Victoria and Albert Museum hosted the archival exhibit Taylor Swift: Songbook Trail, which featured clothing, awards, instruments, and other articles crucial to Swift's life and legacy.
- At a Dublin beach, Today FM installed a 100-meter sign reading "Ireland (Taylor's Version)".
- Variety and People released special Eras Tour editions of their magazine.
- Florida's Brightline launched a Swift sing-along train service from Orlando to Aventura.
- In New Orleans, large friendship bracelets were installed on Caesars Superdome. The same friendship bracelets were exchanged and then displayed on the Lucas Oil Stadium in Indianapolis, Rogers Centre in Toronto and BC Place in Vancouver. It was later reported that one of Swift's companies bought the 140 feet (43 m)-long inflatable friendship bracelets for $13,000.
- The Audubon Nature Institute hosted a Taylor Swift Takeover at Audubon Zoo, Audubon Aquarium, and Audubon Insectarium on October 25–27, 2024. The takeover featured Taylor Swift-themed events, merchandise, and decorations across all three attractions.
- The JW Marriott hotel in downtown Indianapolis displayed a large image of Swift on its building facade. The Indianapolis Motor Speedway unveiled 11 helmets and an IndyCar show car livery whose designs were inspired by Swift and her discography.
- In Toronto, the Metro Toronto Convention Centre hosted the "Toronto's Version: Taylgate '24" event on the days of Swift's shows in the city. Rogers pledged to match donations to the Daily Bread Food Bank up to $113,000, referencing Swift's lucky number, 13, and her philanthropic efforts throughout the tour.
- In 2025, Madame Tussauds launched its "most ambitious project" yet, unveiling 13 new, unique wax figures of Swift across its 13 museums (New York Nashville, Las Vegas, Orlando, Amsterdam, Berlin, Blackpool, Budapest, Hong Kong, London, Sydney, and Shanghai), each one hosting a look from the Eras Tour's various segments.

== Critical analysis ==
It will take some time before all the implications of Taylor Swift's Eras Tour are fully understood. Her epochal trek is a potent multifaceted symbol for our times rife with social, political, economic and cultural meaning, which we'll leave to cultural theorists and pundits to deconstruct. From a live industry standpoint, however, her stadium tour is both qualitatively and quantitatively a high-water mark that left the showgoer completely agog.

— Andy Gensler, Pollstar

The Recording Academy published, the tour is "the most legendary of [Swift's] generation", emphasizing it is "hard to imagine that any other tour this year will have a cultural impact as big". USA Today described the tour as a "historically monumental event". The Guardian said the tour is 2023's "single most significant pop culture phenomenon". Many critics also opined that the tour marked the greatest moment in Swift's career. Rolling Stone described it as her most definitive "imperial phase".

Many critics considered the "cultural domination" of the Eras Tour a rarity. Time journalists called it an "unmatched success" and a "in a league of its own". Amanda Petrusich wrote, despite the noted decline of monocultural affairs in contemporary popular culture as consumers "no longer consume the same cultural objects at the same time or in the same way", the Eras Tour is an exception, achieving a rare, "mind-boggling inescapability". According to Pollstar, the tour "[did not just enter] the broader discourse but, in so many ways, its gravity is so formidable that the tour and everything that's fallen into its orbit drives the discourse." Editor Andy Gensler labeled Swift "the torchbearer for the live industry". Shirley McMarlin of Pittsburgh Tribune-Review wrote, "Taylor Swift is the biggest thing going in the entertainment industry. Turn on the TV or radio, scroll social media, listen to talk on the street, and there she is." Ryan Faughnder of the Los Angeles Times felt that the Eras Tour turned into a "the ultimate FOMO-inducing event". In the opinion of Vogue's Megan Angelo, the Eras Tour "cemented Woodstock-level status in American musical history" and the "last bastion of monoculture". As per Billboard, "it would be no exaggeration to call the Eras Tour the single most anticipated live trek of the century."

Mikael Wood and August Brown of the Los Angeles Times wrote, the tour remained "atop the cultural conversation virtually nonstop" since it started. According to Bill Werde, professor of music and entertainment industries in Syracuse University, "the last artist who could effortlessly sell out stadiums and was simultaneously on top of their game in terms of the zeitgeist of popular music—the name that comes to my mind is Michael Jackson. This is really like the Thriller era." The New York Times author Ben Sisario opined, the tour showed that Swift has a "white-hot demand and media saturation" unseen since Jackson and Madonna in the 1980s, and that she stood above artists that toured concurrently, such as Beyoncé, Bruce Springsteen, and Drake, in terms of success and "media noise". Variety critic Chris Willman said the Eras Tour is like a "career-capping Beatles tour that never happened", surpassing all the tours of the past in terms of business and cultural significance. BBC's Savage declared, "We're unlikely to see another tour on this scale for a long time."

Journalists credited the Eras Tour with popularizing and legitimizing the notion and concept of "eras" in terms of a music career. The A.V. Club opined that the concept is one of Swift's signatures. The Guardian journalist Dave Simpson wrote that the 44-song set list of the Eras Tour might increase the demand for "longer" concerts and may "trigger a set list arms race as artists battle to play longer than each other." He opined that the It's All a Blur Tour, an upcoming co-headlining tour by Drake and 21 Savage, was inspired by the concept of the Eras Tour, with the former's promotional poster depicting a "career retrospective" similar to the latter. Rolling Stone further noted the influence of Swift's tour on the Jonas Brothers' 2023–2024 tour, the Five Albums. One Night. The World Tour, on which they performed songs from "five albums every night". Sabrina Carpenter and will.i.am commented on how the Eras Tour inspired their respective tour and residency. Filmmaker Steven Soderbergh praised the tour, concert film and Swift's work ethic: "What she is doing, the way she is doing it... Nobody has ever done this before. The amount of control she has taken over. She is relentless". Soderbergh further stated that the success of the Eras Tour inspired the development of a new project.

=== Feminist perspectives ===
A number of culture critics examined the tour's impact in a feminist lens. Tyler Foggatt wrote, the Eras Tour transformed "a football stadium, typically a center of male aggression, into a sanctum of gleeful femininity." She compared it to the 2017 Women's March, though mentioned there were sequins instead of pussyhats, and the tour included "probably the same number of male allies." In The New York Times, American author Michelle Goldberg compared the cultural impact of the Eras Tour to that of Barbie (2023), a fantasy comedy film, and dubbed them both 2023 summer's biggest entertainment phenomena celebrating mainstream femininity but also "beneath their slick, exuberant pop surfaces, tell female coming-of-age stories marked by existential crises and bitter confrontations with sexism." Goldberg opined that the "gargantuan" success of both the works prove there "is a huge, underserved market for entertainment that takes the feelings of girls and women seriously."

Talia Lakritz of Insider said both the Eras Tour and Barbie are inspiring a movement among women "to reclaim girlhood without rescinding power." Lakritz added that being at an Eras Tour concert and a movie theater playing Barbie gave her the same feeling—"the collective joy of femininity". Sisario considered both works as critiques of patriarchy that showed women's control over pop culture. In a similar view, Willman said that the two works of entertainment use patriarchy as a subject of irony "while being utterly friendly to and welcoming of men as much as anybody" and became billion-dollar-earning phenomena. Jess Cartner-Morley of The Guardian opined that the Eras Tour and Barbie are "at heart, about celebrating and questioning what it means to be a girl." Taffy Brodesser-Akner of The New York Times wrote that the tour and its wider phenomenon can be seen as Swift "free[ing] women to celebrate their girlhood, to understand that their womanhood is made up of... microchapters of change... the acknowledgment of girls as people to memorialize, of who we are and who we were, all existing in the same body, on the same timeline."

Many journalists considered the Eras Tour, Barbie and Beyoncé's Renaissance World Tour as triumphant works of women's creativity. Larry Vincent, marketing professor from the USC Marshall School of Business, said the Eras Tour and Barbie were two summer phenomena that showed a "really strong ritual dimension of [women-driven] consumer behavior". According to author Katherine Wintsch, "It's a sense of solidarity that women are willing to pay good money for." Mary Siroky of Consequence opined that the tour proves "centering women in entertainment isn't just smart, it's necessary."

Bloomberg News reported that, in China, the themes celebrated in the film "stand in stark" contrast to CCP general secretary Xi Jinping's increasingly conservative vision for women, providing a rare outlet for young women rejecting ever-tighter social control and the Chinese Communist Party (CCP)'s rigid expectations.

=== Year-end retrospectives ===
In placing Swift as the first and only entertainer ever in the top five of their annual "World's Most Powerful Women" in 2023, Forbes claimed that "17 years into her remarkable career, Swift has never had more economic, cultural and political clout." Swift also topped People's "25 Most Intriguing People of the Year" (2023) list; journalist Jeff Nelson opined that Swift, as a 33-year-old female popstar, "has taken a hammer to that glass ceiling, shattering expectations—and blazing a path for the next generation of female artists." The Eras Tour also lead CNN to name Swift "The businessperson of the year"; Natasha Aaron of The Washington Post listed Swift as one of 2023's trailblazers, for having "shifted the economic plate tectonics of the entertainment industry."

Many publications considered the Eras Tour the highlight of 2023 and named 2023 as one of the best years for her career. The Hollywood Reporter opined, "Arguably, Taylor Swift had one of the best years for a person working in the entertainment industry ever." Billboard published, "Swift's 2023 will now be the year that all future pop stars will be measured against." The A.V. Club opined "Swift was pop culture's undisputed champion of 2023, and no one has ever had a year like hers". Writing for MSNBC, Michael A. Cohen also remarked that "When the history books are written, 2023 will be remembered as the year of Swift." Ethan Millman of Rolling Stone said "by any metric, Swift's 2023 was one of the most impressive years of all time for a singular pop star." Swift was included in CNBC's inaugural "changemakers list", highlighting women who are creating a pattern of what it takes to defy the odds, innovate and thrive in a volatile business landscape.

Business Insider opined, "Swift was easily the most dominant cultural force of 2023, and the Eras Tour was the defining pop culture event of 2023." Consequence credited the Eras Tour with helping Swift dominate the popular culture of 2023 in a distinct way than she has in the preceding years. The Independent and Hindustan Times deemed the year "2023 (Taylor's Version)".
