= Taylor Swift: The Eras Tour =

2023 and 2025 concert films

- Theatrical release poster
- Directed by: Sam Wrench
- Produced by: Taylor Swift
- Starring: Taylor Swift
- Cinematography: Brett Turnbull
- Edited by: Dom Whitworth; Guy Harding; Hamish Lyons; Rupa Rathod; Ben Wainwright-Pearce; Mark 'Reg' Wrench
- Music by: Taylor Swift
- Production companies: Taylor Swift Productions; Silent House Productions
- Distributed by: AMC Theatres Distribution; Variance Films; Alibaba Pictures (China markets); Disney+ (streaming)
- Release dates: October 11, 2023 (The Grove, Los Angeles); October 13, 2023 (United States); March 14, 2024 (Disney+)
- Running time: 169 minutes
- Country: United States
- Language: English
- Budget: $15 million
- Box office: $267.1 million

Taylor Swift: The Eras Tour (Note: Stylized as Taylor Swift | The Eras Tour) is a 2023 American concert film produced by the singer-songwriter Taylor Swift and directed by Sam Wrench. It documents the Los Angeles shows of the Eras Tour (2023–2024), Swift's sixth headlining concert tour and the highest-grossing tour of all time. Swift struck an unprecedented distribution agreement with AMC Theatres and Cinemark Theatres for the film after negotiations with the major film studios fell through.

Filming took place in August 2023 across three shows at SoFi Stadium in Inglewood, California, with a budget of $10–20 million and SAG-AFTRA permitting production to proceed amidst its 2023 strike. Swift announced the film later that month, catching studios off guard and causing the release dates of several films that had been set for release on or near October 13 to be moved. The unconventional release strategy was a topic of media discourse; many journalists and industry personnel praised Swift's move to bypass the studios to partner with theatres and opined that the move defied the traditional producer–distributor–exhibitor model of releasing films.

The film premiered at the Grove in Los Angeles on October 11, 2023, and was released to theaters worldwide on October 13. It was met with significant ticket demand, amassing a record $37 million on its first day of pre-sales in the U.S. and over $100 million in total global pre-sales. The Eras Tour became the highest-grossing concert film of all time, earning $267.1 million in its limited theatrical run worldwide. It received acclaim from critics, most of whom praised the direction, spectacle, energy, and Swift's artistry and showmanship. An extended cut of the film, subtitled (Taylor's Version), includes performances withheld from the theatrical edit and was released on the streaming service Disney+ on March 14, 2024.

A second concert film recorded at the tour's final show on December 8, 2024, in Vancouver, was also released on Disney+ on December 12, 2025. Subtitled The Final Show, the film was directed by Glenn Weiss and featured The Tortured Poets Department act that was incorporated into the tour's setlist after Wrench's film was released. It has received five nominations at the 78th Primetime Emmy Awards, including for Outstanding Variety Special (Pre-Recorded).

== Plot ==
The film is a "cinematic rendering" of the Eras Tour, the sixth headlining concert tour by the American singer-songwriter Taylor Swift. Representing Swift's discography conceptually in 10 acts ("eras"), it depicts performances of most songs on the tour's set list, with several songs and intermissions cut to condense the 3.5-hour show into a 2.75-hour film. (Note: In the theatrical release, "Wildest Dreams" (2014), "The Archer" (2019), "No Body, No Crime", "Invisible String" (replaced with "The 1"), "Cardigan" and "'Tis the Damn Season" (2020) are absent in the film. "Long Live" (2010) is absent in the film, but included in the ending credits. "The Archer", "Long Live", and "Wildest Dreams" are later included on both the VOD "extended version" and the Disney+ (Taylor's Version). "Cardigan" is also included on the Disney+ release.)

Beginning with a 13-second countdown clock ticking down, the show opens with the Lover act. Hidden by dancers in giant fan-like tapestry, Swift emerges mid-stage in a sparkly pink and blue bodysuit, singing the chorus to "Miss Americana & the Heartbreak Prince", followed by "Cruel Summer". Accompanied by dancers, Swift sings "The Man" and "You Need to Calm Down" in a silver blazer and a set emulating office cubicles. She then performs "Lover" on a pink guitar. Swift ends the first act with "The Archer". The second act, Fearless, sees Swift in a gold fringed dress performing the songs "Fearless", "You Belong with Me" and "Love Story" with her band while her backup singers wore gold and silver jackets and black jumpsuits. The third act, Evermore, features a forest aesthetic. Swift dons an orange gown and a dark green cape and performs "Willow" with dancers holding glowing orbs, followed by "Marjorie", and then "Champagne Problems" at a moss-covered piano. She ends the act with "Tolerate It", where she and a male dancer, Raphael Thomas, play a troubled couple at a dinner table.

In the snake-themed fourth act, Reputation, Swift delivers a high-energy performance of "...Ready for It?" in a black and red asymmetrical catsuit accompanied by female dancers wearing black-dark red gothic leotards. She follows with "Delicate" as cracks appear on the stage. In "Don't Blame Me", Swift is surrounded by light beams. She transitions to "Look What You Made Me Do", with dancers dressed as Swift from the other album eras being trapped in glass boxes. In the purple-themed fifth act, Speak Now, she performs "Enchanted" in a purple ombre ball gown as she is encircled by female dancers wearing lavender-colored dresses. The sixth act, Red, is colored accordingly. Accompanied by dancers, Swift performs "22" in a black hat and white T-shirt with the phrase "a lot going on at the moment", modified from the shirt from the song's music video. At every concert towards the end of the song she gives the hat to a fan pre-selected from the audience; in the film she gives the hat to Bianka Bryant, the daughter of the late American basketball player Kobe Bryant. Next, dressed in a red-to-black romper, she performs "We Are Never Ever Getting Back Together" and "I Knew You Were Trouble" with the male dancers. Donning a red and black ombre coat, she performs "All Too Well (10 Minute Version)" on a guitar. Cottagecore takes the stage in the seventh act, Folklore, which features a cabin and staircase setup onstage. Swift wears a white dress and performs "The 1"; "Betty", with her guitar, backup vocalists, and band; "The Last Great American Dynasty", with dancers as period characters; solo performances of "August" and a rock-tinged "Illicit Affairs"; and "My Tears Ricochet" in a funeral procession with female dancers wearing black long-sleeved dresses.

For the eighth act, 1989, Swift wears a pink crop top and skirt while her dancers wear black and white outfits. She sings "Style", "Blank Space", "Shake It Off", and "Bad Blood"; "Blank Space" features female dancers with neon golf clubs destroying an animated car, while female dancers and pyrotechnics accompany "Bad Blood". In the ninth act, Swift appears alone in a maroon dress, performing acoustic versions of two surprise songs: "Our Song" on an acoustic guitar and "You're on Your Own, Kid" on a piano. (Note: In the Disney+ (Taylor's Version) release, Swift also performed "I Can See You", "Maroon", "Death by a Thousand Cuts", and "You Are in Love", in addition to the listed songs on the 26-minute "Acoustic Collection" extras, played after the end credits.) In the final act, Midnights, dancers carry out cloud decorations as Swift reappears in a purple faux fur coat to sing "Lavender Haze". Removing the coat, she performs "Anti-Hero", alongside a video of a giant version of herself terrorizing a city. During "Midnight Rain", she performs a quick change on-stage, shielded by her dancers' umbrellas, exchanging an oversized light purple and blue T-shirt for a rhinestone-adorned blue bodysuit. Swift and dancers perform "Vigilante Shit" in a burlesque chair dance, followed by "Bejeweled" and "Mastermind" in choreographed moves. They end the show with "Karma" with Swift and dancers in different coloured tinsel fringed jackets, amidst confetti and fireworks. "Long Live" plays during the end credits.

== Production ==
=== Background and development ===
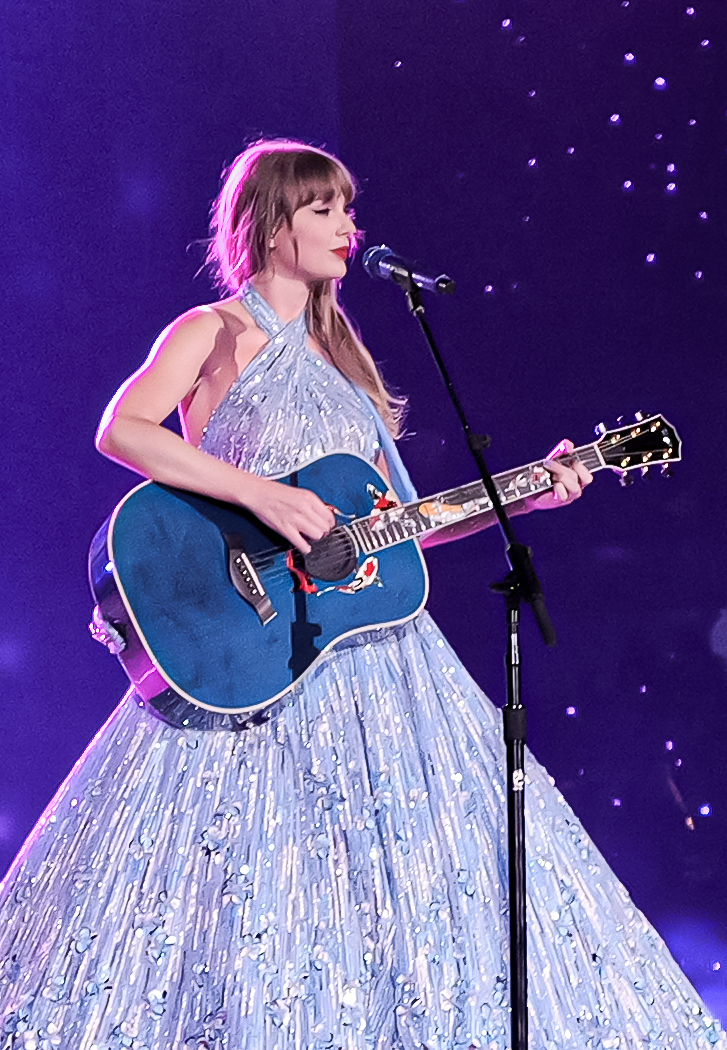
Swift performing at the Eras Tour, at SoFi Stadium in Inglewood, California

The Eras Tour began in Glendale, Arizona, in March 2023, and concluded in Vancouver, British Columbia, in December 2024. Each show spans three and a half hours, with a set list of 44 songs divided into 10 distinct acts that conceptually portray Swift's studio albums. The tour was a commercial success and received critical acclaim. It became a cultural and economic phenomenon, bolstered by globally unprecedented ticket demand and fan frenzy.

In 2023, Swift commissioned a recording of the Eras Tour to be theatrically released as a feature film. Sam Wrench, who previously helmed Billie Eilish: Live at the O2 (2023) and Lizzo: Live in Concert (2022), was hired as director, and the film was recorded at the first three of six Los Angeles shows of the tour from August 3 to 5, 2023, at SoFi Stadium in Inglewood, California. Swift's in-house production company, Taylor Swift Productions, produced the film independently in collaboration with Silent House Productions. Forgoing the involvement of major American film studios allowed Swift to reduce expenses; Puck estimated that the film cost $10–20 million. It was able to be produced, released, and promoted amidst the 2023 SAG-AFTRA strike because it received special approval from SAG-AFTRA as a non-AMPTP production that met "the same standards the unions are seeking in their negotiations with the studios". SAG-AFTRA chief negotiator Duncan Crabtree-Ireland stated that Swift "came to [them] and said she wanted to do this, but only if she could do it the right way under a union contract". Swift announced the concert film on August 31 through her social media accounts and during an appearance on Good Morning America on ABC. Tickets went on sale the same day in the United States, Canada, and Mexico. On September 26, Swift announced that the film would be released globally.

=== Distribution and ticketing ===
In the U.S., AMC Theatres served as both distributor and exhibitor of The Eras Tour, an unprecedented move in the American film industry, and screened it at least four times per day from Thursday through Sunday during each week of its run. Swift's parents negotiated the term sheet with Adam Aron, CEO of AMC. Ticket prices for standard screenings were preset at $19.89 for adults, a reference to Swift's re-recorded album 1989 (Taylor's Version), and $13.13 for children and seniors, a likely reference to Swift's lucky number, 13. The film was also made available on premium large formats such as IMAX and Dolby Cinema. Each initial ticket purchase included a free poster, while select locations advertised special-themed popcorn and drink containers. In anticipation of high demand following the 2022 Ticketmaster controversy, AMC upgraded its ticket sale systems to accommodate five times its original capacity and temporarily halted sales of most of its other films. Nevertheless, the mobile app crashed shortly after the sales began, and customers were placed in queues to access the website. Within hours of tickets going on sale, the film surpassed $10 million in pre-sales, which box-office analysts likened to the performance of a Marvel film. Global Internet searches for "AMC" spiked more than 100-fold, while AMC's stock experienced a brief 9.2 percent surge. Bloomberg News wrote that news of the film's high ticket sales "boosted stock prices on both sides of the Atlantic".

AMC also served as distributor in other territories, distributing the film internationally and to unaffiliated theater chains for the first time in its history. Cinemark Theatres and other circuits were also granted distribution rights to the film. Chains that screened The Eras Tour include Regal, Cineplex, Cinépolis, Cinemex, and Odeon, in addition to AMC. Variance Films, via a sub-distribution deal, assisted AMC with U.S. bookings at non-AMC locations, and tickets were also available for purchase online via Fandango. The film was reported to screen in 4,000 theaters in North America, as well as more than 8,500 theaters worldwide.

According to media outlets, the terms of its distribution and financing were dictated by Swift rather than AMC. Industry personnel considered the fixed pricing model and unacceptance of theater loyalty programs as highly unconventional and outside norms. No exhibitors or distributors except AMC were aware of the film's release plans until the morning of Swift's announcement; this frustrated executives, as distributors are expected to keep each other informed of their release schedules as a gesture of good faith. Business Insider stated that since the Paramount Consent Decrees "were terminated in 2020", the distribution agreement was legal. Puck journalist Matthew Belloni reported that "disappointing" talks with the major film studios had led Swift to instead negotiate a distribution deal with Aron. As part of the agreement, 43 percent of the box-office earnings will go to theaters, while Swift and AMC's distribution arm will split the remaining 57 percent. Additionally, theaters will retain all concession revenue and can screen the film for up to 26 weeks, although Swift has the option to send the film to streaming services after 13 weeks. The Hollywood Reporter wrote in late October 2023 that "practically every major service" was looking to secure subscription video on demand (SVOD) rights to The Eras Tour following its theatrical run.

Trafalgar Releasing handled the film's global distribution and negotiated the release of the film in China, with Alibaba Pictures and Wanda Cinemas securing the deal. The film was later approved for release in China on December 31, 2023, which The Washington Post called a "rarity" due to the "stringent vetting process for foreign films released in China", which it attributed to Swift's status as the most popular foreign artist in the country with a dedicated fanbase and a favorable reception among Chinese media outlets.

== Release ==
=== Theatrical ===
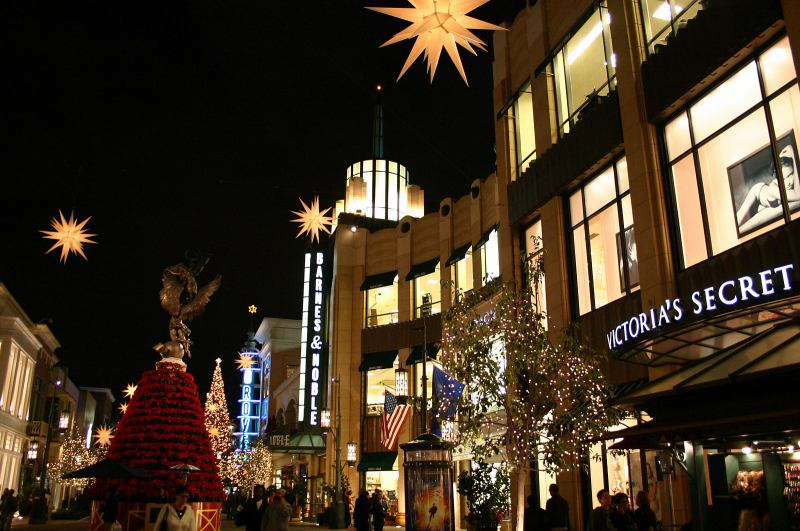
The Grove, an entertainment complex in Los Angeles, hosted the world premiere of Taylor Swift: The Eras Tour on October 11, 2023.

The Eras Tour had its world premiere on October 11, 2023, at the Grove at Farmers Market, an open-air mall complex in Los Angeles, California, with early preview showings on October 12. The Eras Tour's premiere at The Grove was attended by celebrities, journalists, Swift's family, her personnel, and over 2,200 invited Swifties. The mall and surrounding area of West Hollywood were closed for the premiere, with increased police presence. Swift delivered a welcome note in each of the mall's AMC theaters before the screening.

It received a worldwide theatrical release in more than 100 countries and territories on October 13, two weeks before the release of 1989 (Taylor's Version), while some countries and territories had a later premiere date of November 3, and in China on December 31, 2023. In the U.S., Canada, Mexico, and Australia, the film was screened for four consecutive weekends beginning on October 13.

Variety noted that the film's four-weekend theatrical run and wide North American releases were "far from the kind of one- or two-night special engagement that music fans have become used to with filmed concert experiences" in theaters. It also highlighted that limiting screenings to Thursdays, Fridays, Saturdays, and Sundays would make the film feel like an event as audiences "will be able to watch the concert extravaganza with a packed crowd and not in half-empty theaters during a Monday matinee". Deadline Hollywood reported that as of October 9, 2023, The Eras Tour had 65,000 showtimes on opening day across the U.S., totaling around 11.5 million seats. In China, the film opened across 15,000 screens.

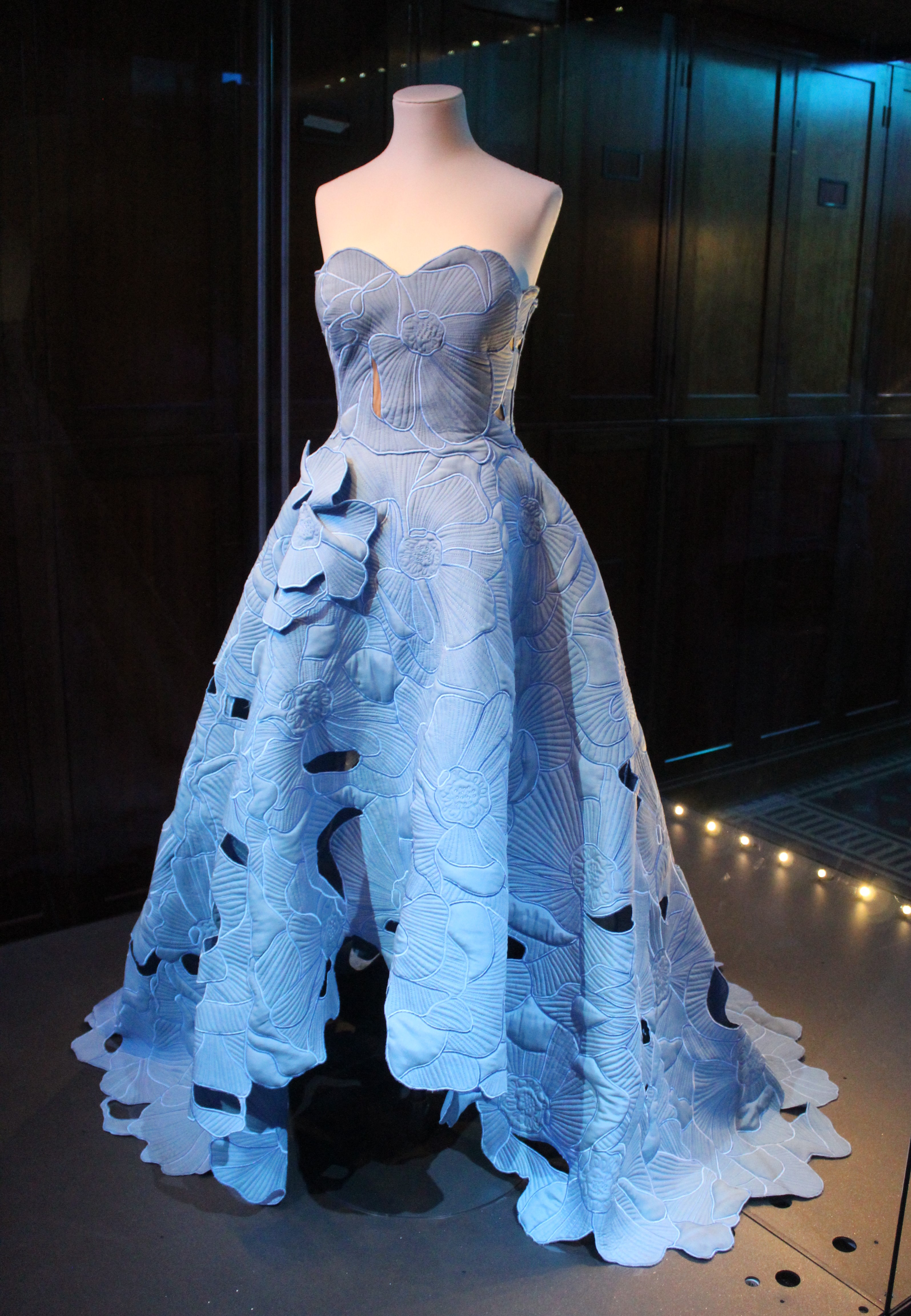
The Oscar de la Renta gown Swift wore to premiere, displayed at the Victoria and Albert Museum, London

=== Streaming and television ===
On December 13, 2023, her 34th birthday, Swift released an extended version of the film in collaboration with Universal Pictures Home Entertainment, featuring performances of "Wildest Dreams", "The Archer" and "Long Live". It was available to rent on video on demand services in select territories for a limited period.

A longer, unabridged edit of the film, subtitled (Taylor's Version), was released to Disney+ on March 14, 2024. It includes the extended performances of "Wildest Dreams", "The Archer", and "Long Live", a performance of "Cardigan", and an acoustic collection featuring six surprise songs, namely "I Can See You", "Maroon", "Death by a Thousand Cuts", "Our Song", "You're on Your Own, Kid" and "You Are in Love". Disney+ purchased the film's exclusive streaming rights for reportedly more than $75 million in a bidding war with Netflix and Universal, negotiated by Swift's brother Austin. To coincide with the launch of the film, the platform temporarily revamped its homepage and genre categories to titles inspired by Swift's eras. Variety reported the film garnered 4.6 million views in its first three days of availability, breaking the record for the most-viewed music film in the history of Disney+. On August 10, 2024, the Disney+ edit of the film was aired for free on the Austrian public television channel ORF 1, after the cancelation of the Eras Tour's three Vienna concerts due to a terrorist plot.

=== The Final Show ===
A second concert film, titled Taylor Swift: The Eras Tour: The Final Show, was released on December 12, 2025, through Disney+. It was recorded at the final show of the tour in Vancouver in December 2024, and features The Tortured Poets Department act from the tour's revamped set list. Directed by Glenn Weiss and produced by Taylor Swift Productions in collaboration with Silent House Productions, the film was released on the same day as the first two episodes of the six-episode behind-the-scenes docuseries, The End of an Era.

== Impact ==
"It's scary that Taylor Swift can come in and become a hit without using conventional marketing routes [...] You have to be an enormous star to put out a single tweet and disrupt the entire industry."

— Bruce Nash, founder of The Numbers

The film's unorthodox strategy in theatrical release generated much commentary from film, music, and entertainment journalists. Vanity Fair opined that the film arrived "just when moviegoing needs it most" and may boost theater earnings after the business was widely affected by the then-ongoing Writers Guild of America and SAG-AFTRA strikes, which affected numerous Hollywood productions. Many journalists expressed similar sentiments, believing the film would "save" the late 2023 box office. National Association of Theatre Owners president Michael O'Leary believed the success of The Eras Tour indicates the potential of concert films in theaters. CNBC commented that Swift would reinvigorate the concert film genre that had first entered cinema theatres in the 1960s. Rolling Stone named The Eras Tour one of the "42 Must-See Movies of Fall 2023".

The Daily Telegraph praised Swift as "the greatest tactician in showbusiness," writing, "Barbenheimer showed people will go to the cinema if they feel they are participating in a communal experience. Hollywood refused to take advantage of this. So Swift has instead." Analyses from Collider and TheWrap concluded that by successfully negotiating her deal and proving its profitability, Swift incentivized theaters to find programming without the help of the studios, "potentially changing the dynamics of cinema distribution." British-American filmmaker Christopher Nolan supported her "unorthodox release model" and claimed concert films are the future of moviegoing. Tony Vinciquerra, chairman and CEO of Sony Pictures, called The Eras Tour a "massive, unexpected rescue" for theaters. Variety opined that the film saved the fall movie season.

Media publications believed Swift and AMC's partnership "[had] the potential to rewrite the rules" of film distribution. Billboard noted the "unusual deal" could influence AMC and other exhibitors to expand their distribution operations to include other concert films. On October 1, 2023, American singer Beyoncé announced Renaissance: A Film by Beyoncé, a concert film of her Renaissance World Tour, in the advent of The Eras Tour's release. Renaissance had the same distribution deal "forged by AMC and [Swift]" without the involvement of the major studios. Beyoncé later attended The Eras Tour's premiere. Ray Nutt, CEO of live entertainment content provider Fathom Events, opined that a "post-Eras concert film boom" is imminent, with studios "reaching out in earnest, looking for partnership" and artists "already making calls and taking cues from Swift's Eras deal." AMC Entertainment CEO Adam Aron said, "The phone has been ringing off the hook since they have announced Eras tour concert film release, and a significant number of the world's best artists would like to explore doing things with AMC, after the success of Swift's deal." Sarah Whitten of CNBC named the film "one of the most important of the year, for recreating a staple experience of attending live concerts." Variety also remarked that "the concert film rewrote the box office rules in 2023 by changing concert film experience."

According to AMC CEO Adam Aron, the popularity of the film's popcorn bucket inspired the company to market merchandise for more films, a practice also adopted by other theater chains like Cinemark, Marcus, Regal and B&B to increase concession sales, attract moviegoers on opening weekends, and enhance the theatrical experience.

=== Affected films ===
Various films moved their theatrical release dates to avoid competing with Swift. The hashtag "#Exorswift" trended on social media after the concert film was announced, as The Eras Tour had the same release date as The Exorcist: Believer, a supernatural horror film. This was in reference to the "Barbenheimer" phenomenon surrounding Barbie (2023) and Oppenheimer (2023) earlier that year. In response, Universal Pictures and Blumhouse Productions advanced the release of Believer, originally on a Friday the 13th, by one week, a move IndieWire observed likely did not come at a low cost considering Believer's expensive marketing campaign. Paramount Pictures and Apple Studios also abandoned plans for a two-week limited run of the western crime drama film Killers of the Flower Moon, directed by Martin Scorsese, preceding its wide release on October 20.

List of feature films that changed their release dates to accommodate The Eras Tour
Film	Distributor	Original date	New date	Ref.
Dumb Money	Sony Pictures	October 6, 2023	September 29, 2023	
The Exorcist: Believer	Universal Pictures	October 13, 2023	October 6, 2023	
Freelance	Relativity Media	October 6, 2023	October 27, 2023	
The Marsh King's Daughter	Lionsgate	October 6, 2023	November 3, 2023	
Ordinary Angels	Lionsgate	October 13, 2023	February 23, 2024	
The Persian Version	Sony Pictures	October 13, 2023	October 20, 2023	
Priscilla	A24	October 27, 2023	November 3, 2023	
What Happens Later	Bleecker Street	October 13, 2023	November 3, 2023	

== Box office ==
=== Pre-release ===
The Eras Tour was met with unprecedented ticket demand. Given its unorthodox release model, various industry personnel attempted to predict the film's box-office gross. Comscore analyst Paul Dergarabedian told CNBC that "speculation [was] running rampant as to how massive the opening weekend will be." Billboard opined, "While such concert docs have historically been fan-only fare, with limited box-office ceilings, news of The Eras Tour was greeted as if it was the new Marvel blockbuster". The U.S. projections for the opening weekend gross ranged from a record $70 million to $100 million among media outlets. The Hollywood Reporter and Deadline Hollywood reported that the film was vying for a global opening-week gross of $150–200 million ($100–125 million in North America and $50–75 million overseas), stating that its "truncated" theatrical run was an obstacle in predicting its gross. The full gross from its theatrical run in the U.S. and Canada was projected by Variety to be $200–250 million. The New York Times expressed uncertainty regarding the film's box-office forecasts, claiming they are based on moviegoer surveys and marketing, and hence the ticket sales could either sustain or decline after the opening weekend.

On September 1, 2023, AMC announced that The Eras Tour had grossed $26 million within three hours on its platform, marking the highest-ever single-day advance ticket sales in the company's history, surpassing the previous record of $16.9 million by Spider-Man: No Way Home (2021). Wanda Gierhart Fearing, chief marketing officer of Cinemark, reported they had booked an "unprecedented number of auditoriums" to meet demand. Hence, AMC and Cinemark added more showtimes. IMAX sold out more than 250 screenings of the film in one day, a number similar to that of "a blockbuster tentpole feature". Fandango reported that The Eras Tour had set a platform record for the highest first-day ticket sales in 2023, comparable to No Way Home, Avengers: Endgame (2019), and Star Wars: The Force Awakens (2015). Deadline Hollywood reported that the film had earned over $37 million in first-day pre-sale revenue across the U.S., surpassing The Force Awakens' $20 million and marking the second-highest pre-sale tally ever, behind Endgame's $50 million. By September 15, the film's pre-sale revenue had reached $65 million, surpassing Doctor Strange in the Multiverse of Madness (2022)'s $60 million and The Batman (2022)'s $42 million.

AMC reported $100 million earned in global pre-sales a week before the film's release, surpassing Justin Bieber: Never Say Never (2011; $73 million) to become the highest-grossing concert film of all time. As of October 9, 2023, around 4200 showtimes of the film in the U.S. were sold out, outpacing Barbie (2023), which had 500 sold-out shows in the same timeframe. In Mexico, during the first days of pre-sale, the film sold a record 292,500 tickets at Cinépolis theaters, surpassing that of Avengers: Infinity War (2018). In Australia, the film grossed more than $300,000 within the first 12 hours of pre-sales at Hoyts, tripling the first-day pre-sales of Avatar: The Way of Water (2022). In the United Kingdom, the film broke the Vue record for the highest first-day and first-week pre-sales for a concert film, surpassing BTS: Permission to Dance on Stage (2022).

=== Performance ===
Taylor Swift: The Eras Tour grossed $180.8 million in the United States and Canada, and $86.3 million in other territories, for a worldwide total of $261.7 million. It is the highest grossing concert or performance film of all time, a feat recognized in the 2023 Guinness World Records. Deadline Hollywood calculated the net profit of the film to be $172 million, when factoring together all expenses and revenues.

In the U.S., The Eras Tour made $2.8 million from Thursday night previews at 2,700 theaters, which were added only the day prior. It grossed $39 million on its first day (including previews), marking the second-best opening day for an October release, behind Joker (2019) by $300,000, and the best ever for a concert film. It went on to debut to $92.8 million, marking the second-best October opening of all time, behind Joker's $96.2 million. It also marked the best-ever opening weekend for a concert film; 26% of the gross was from IMAX screenings, while 60% was from pre-sales. AMC-owned theaters accounted for 40.5% of the sales, compared to a typical 22–25% share. The film eclipsed newcomer Killers of the Flower Moon to remain at the number one spot in the second weekend, earning $33.2 million and becoming the first concert film to spend two consecutive weeks atop the box office. The film made $15.4 million and $13.5 million in its third and fourth weekend, respectively, finishing second behind the supernatural horror film Five Nights at Freddy's (2023) both times.

The film made $30.7 million from international territories and a global total of $123.5 million in its first week. It opened at No.1 in the UK and Ireland with a gross of over £1,000,000 ($1.3 million USD) as per Vue. It took the biggest opening worldwide surpassing Vijay's Leo and DiCaprio's Killers of the Flower Moon. In India, The Eras Tour sold over 85,000 tickets for its opening weekend—a record for concert films in the country. In Brazil, the film opened with a gross of nearly R$5,000,000 ($1.01 million USD), whereas in China, it collected US$5.7 million dollars on its opening day, on its way to a gross of CN¥ 95,000,000 (US$13.2 million), become the highest grossing concert film in China at the time.

== Reception ==
=== Critical response ===
Upon release, The Eras Tour received acclaim from critics, and was recognized as "the must-see movie of the season", providing a compelling representation of the live performance on the screen. On the review aggregator website Rotten Tomatoes, 98% of 96 critics' reviews are positive, with an average rating of 8.3/10. The website's consensus reads: "Taylor Swift: The Eras Tour delivers exactly what it promises: A smoothly directed, impeccably performed documentary capturing the concert event of the year." Metacritic, which uses a weighted average, assigned the film a score of 82 out of 100, based on 30 critics, indicating "universal acclaim". It was the best reviewed musical movie of 2023, as per Rotten Tomatoes.

Lina Das of The Daily Telegraph and Keiran Southern of The Sunday Times praised the film's energy and spectacle. Southern felt the film surpassed the live show in some aspects, with the camera work putting the audience "onto the stage with Swift". Kristen Lopez of TheWrap dubbed the film "a bombastic celebration of joy and color" and a "spectacle of sound", whereas Christy Lemire of RogerEbert.com called it a "technical spectacle" and a "dazzling achievement". Reviews from Angie Han of The Hollywood Reporter, Ann Hornaday of The Washington Post, Ludovic Hunter-Tilney of Financial Times, Rob Sheffield of Rolling Stone, and Bilal Qureshi of NPR called the film an impressive and immersive work. New York's Craig Jenkins and Little White Lies' Lillian Crawford praised the cinematography for its portrayal of Swift's musicianship. Katie Campione of Deadline Hollywood emphasized the visuals, energy, and vibrance, while Tim Grierson of Screen International felt it was a both rousing and intimate view of Swift's musical dexterity. Peter Travers, writing for ABC News, said the film "beautifully accentuates [Swift's] gifts for artistic reinvention."

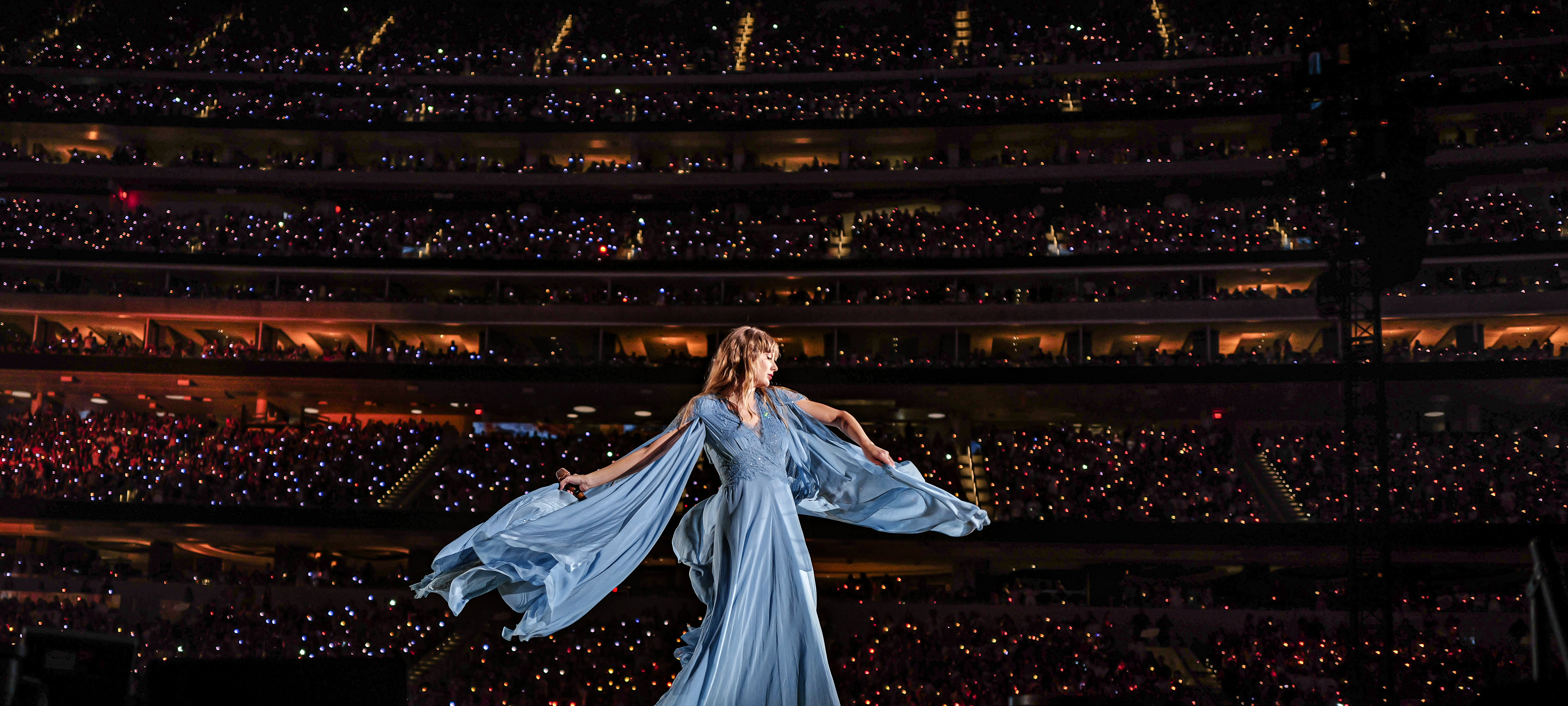
A number of critics praised the film's spectacle, which they attributed to the visual production of the concert and the cinematography of the stadium and Swift up-close, ensuing in an immersive quality. (Note: Attributed to Das, Southern, Grierson, Lopez, Hunter-Tilney, Sheffield, and Qureshi, among others.)

On the film's structure, Savannah Walsh of Vanity Fair highlighted that the film eschewed five songs and shortened the transitions between songs "to shave the 3-hour-and-15-minute concert into a still-supersized 2 hours and 45 minutes." The Associated Press' Maria Sherman and The Guardian's Adriana Horton agreed that the film highlights the details potentially "missed" in a stadium; Sherman called it a near replica of the concert with limited edits and "stage banter", while Horton felt that the "meticulous" camerawork directed by Wrench aptly featured the dancers, backing vocalists, and band, who are often "overshadowed" by Swift during live shows. Cindy White of The A.V. Club liked how the concert is concise in the film to allow a seamless "flow" between songs and appreciated the "expertly mixed" sound—the crowd noise diminished to focus on Swift's "energetic" vocals.

Some critics faulted Wrench's camera direction. Wesley Morris of The New York Times called The Eras Tour a monumental and revelatory film; he praised Swift's "arresting stature" while criticizing Wrench for allowing shots "all over the place", but admitted accommodating the stage's scale and high-tech screen imaging into a cohesive film is an arduous task. Similarly, Time's Stephanie Zacharek disliked some of Wrench's "reckless" camerawork choices, but felt Swift's stage presence "instantaneously airbrushes every questionable filmmaking decision into oblivion." Michael Phillips of Chicago Tribune described Wrench as a director who typically employs conventional framing and editing approaches, but the film could have benefited from a more steady editing pace and reduced camera shifts to fan reactions. Mike Shutt from /Film thought that most of the film lacked meticulous shot compositions, and felt that Wrench relied on multi-camera footage and an expedited editing process. Richard Brody of The New Yorker said the film increased his understanding of Swift's artistry but felt that the short and monotonous camera shots made the watching experience "wearying".

Conversely, Alejandra Martinez of The Austin Chronicle said the shots offer a "great sense of scope", capturing the show's scale and emotion while "ramping up the excitement with every frame." Alonso Duralde called it a "beautifully shot and edited" film spotlighting Swift's showmanship. Melissa Ruggieri wrote in USA Today that the film "offers a front-row seat to the grandeur", complimenting the camerawork for capturing the tour's detailed production and Swift's charisma. In congruence, Uproxx's Philip Cosores and Variety's Chris Willman said the film prolifically emphasizes the performance and production details that "get easily obscured by the overwhelming nature of live music" from a concertgoer standpoint. NME's Kevin EG Perry described the film as "three hours of slick, lovingly shot footage of a modern pop star operating at the very peak of her powers."

=== Audience reception ===
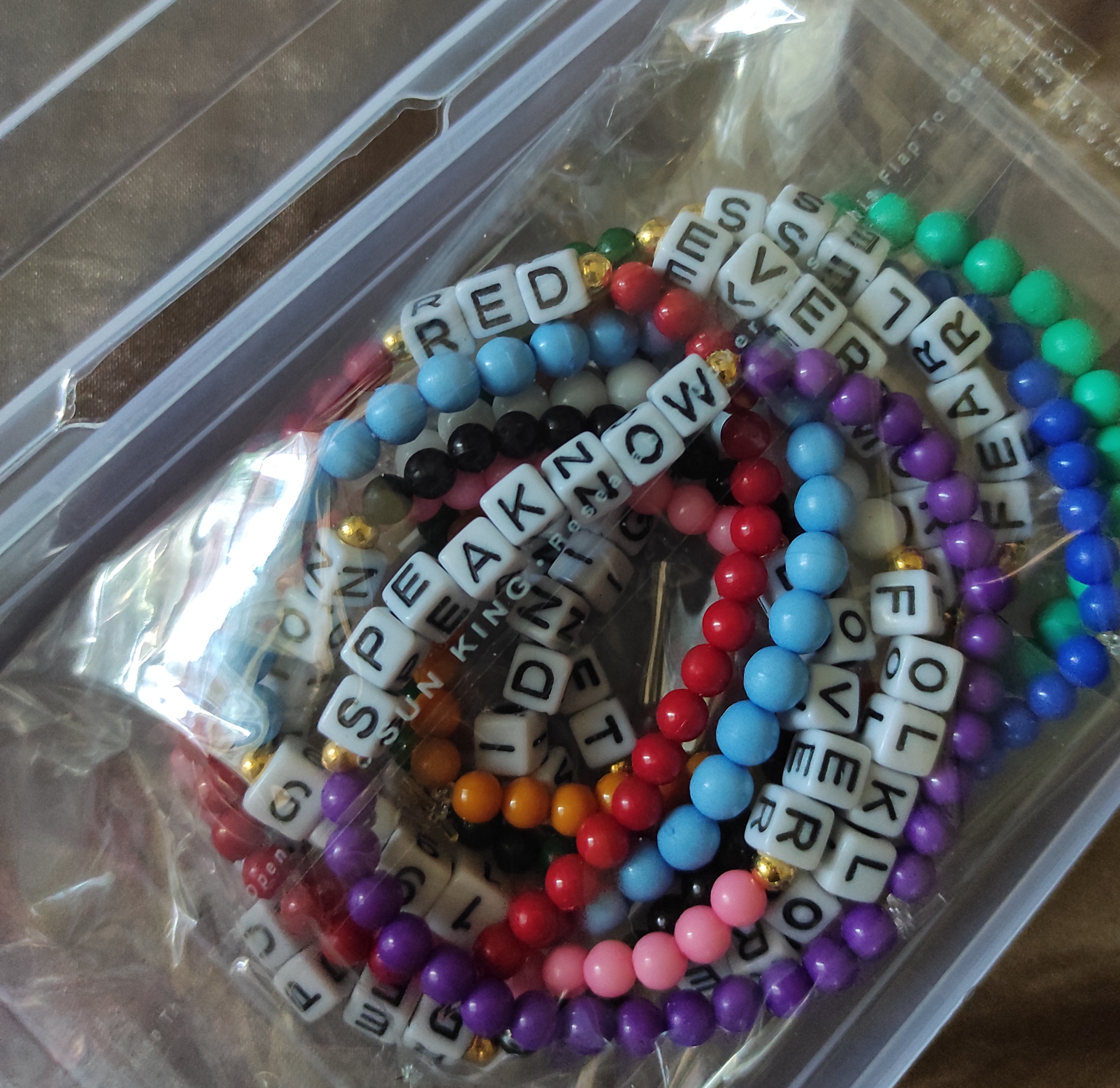
A number of fans made friendship bracelets and shared them at the screenings of Taylor Swift: The Eras Tour—a reference to the lyrics in Swift's 2022 song "You're on Your Own, Kid".

Audiences polled by CinemaScore gave the film a rare average grade of "A+", while those polled at PostTrak gave it a 96% overall positive score, with 89% saying they would definitely recommend the film. Rolling Stone commented that cinemas were bracing for rowdy crowds after Swift encouraged her fans, the Swifties, to sing and dance at film screenings. The Wall Street Journal, CNBC and The Guardian reported that multiple cinemas were altering rules around audience behavior for The Eras Tour such as suspending evening age restrictions and allowing phone use, singing and dancing. Some theaters worked to recreate the tour's atmosphere by encouraging fans to dress up, offering friendship bracelet-making stations, and selling themed refreshments and merchandise. Audiences in some opening-day shows of the film were reported to have had highly enthusiastic and fanatic reactions.

The Hollywood Reporter journalists reported dancing, singing and cheering audiences at the premiere, and that some screenings on the official release date "felt more like a concert" in terms of behavior while others "were more muted". The A.V. Club's Emma Keates felt it was jarring to attend a screening with no fan frenzy. Hornaday, who attended a screening where the audience was chanting, shouting and singing, opined "one of the delights of The Eras Tour is that it makes moviegoing a contact, call-and-response sport, with audiences literally dancing in the aisles and waving at the screen as if their idol can see them." Insider's Eve Crosbie and NBC's Emilie Ikeda noted that videos of such audiences "divided" social media users who debated on audience etiquette; some felt it was a communal experience while some others felt it was excessive and disruptive.

The film marked the first, official Swift-related activity in India, where the film was released on November 3, 2023, and was met with fan frenzy, "delightful chaos", "loud cheers", group singing and dancing. India Today reported that the theatre staff across India were unprepared for the energy and excitement of Indian Swifties. Local media drew comparisons with prominent Indian actors such as Salman Khan and Vijay, while internet users were critical of "the love Indians were showering on an American pop star, saying they were obsessed with Western culture." Indian Swifties on social media argued that "if it was acceptable for fans to stand outside Shah Rukh Khan's house to watch him wave at them for a few minutes, they should not be criticised for enjoying the theatre experience they paid for." According to journalist Chingkheingambi Mayengbam, Swift and her concerts "provide a space for celebration without conflict—she's not fighting goons, revelling as the anti-hero, but fighting her own demons. Fans feel empowered without suppressing others, and her music serves as a medium for catharsis and emotional expression." In China, where the film was released on December 31, 2023, it was met with "jubilation and frenzied planning—as thousands of fans have mobilized across the country", as per The Washington Post. The Chinese messaging platform WeChat reported an influx of groups in various cities dedicated to purchasing tickets before they sell out. In Beijing, people "scoured Imax theaters to secure commemorative popcorn cups and drinkware printed with Swift's face" ahead of the theatrical release.

== Accolades ==
List of awards and nominations received by Taylor Swift: The Eras Tour and The Final Show
Film	Organization	Year	Category	Result	Ref.
Taylor Swift: The Eras Tour	Critics' Choice Documentary Awards	2023	Best Music Documentary	Nominated	
Taylor Swift: The Eras Tour	Guinness World Records	2023	Highest-grossing performance or concert film in history	Won	
Taylor Swift: The Eras Tour	Golden Tomato Awards	2023	Best Reviewed Musical Movie of 2023	Won	
Taylor Swift: The Eras Tour	Golden Globe Awards	2024	Cinematic and Box Office Achievement	Nominated	
Taylor Swift: The Eras Tour	Astra Film Awards	2024	Best Documentary Feature	Nominated	
Taylor Swift: The Eras Tour	Kansas City Film Critics Circle Awards	2024	Best Documentary	Won	
Taylor Swift: The Eras Tour	People's Choice Awards	2024	Movie of the Year	Nominated	
Taylor Swift: The Eras Tour	Cinema Audio Society Awards	2024	Outstanding Achievement in Sound Mixing for a Motion Picture – Documentary	Nominated	
Taylor Swift: The Eras Tour	Golden Reel Awards	2024	Outstanding Achievement in Sound Editing – Feature Documentary	Nominated	
Taylor Swift: The Eras Tour	Eddie Awards	2024	Best Edited Variety/Sketch Show or Special	Won	
Taylor Swift: The Eras Tour	iHeartRadio Music Awards	2024	Favorite On Screen	Nominated	
Taylor Swift: The Eras Tour	iHeartRadio Music Awards	2025	Favorite On Screen	Won	
Taylor Swift: The Eras Tour	AACTA Audience Choice Awards	2024	Favourite Film	Nominated	
Taylor Swift: The Eras Tour: The Final Show	Astra TV Awards	2026	Best Standup or Variety Special	Nominated	
Taylor Swift: The Eras Tour: The Final Show	Primetime Emmy Awards	2026	Outstanding Variety Special (Pre-Recorded)	Nominated	
Taylor Swift: The Eras Tour: The Final Show	Primetime Emmy Awards	2026	Outstanding Directing for a Variety Special	Nominated	
Taylor Swift: The Eras Tour: The Final Show	Primetime Emmy Awards	2026	Outstanding Picture Editing for Variety Programming	Nominated	
Taylor Swift: The Eras Tour: The Final Show	Primetime Emmy Awards	2026	Outstanding Sound Mixing for a Variety Series or Special	Nominated	
Taylor Swift: The Eras Tour: The Final Show	Primetime Emmy Awards	2026	Outstanding Technical Direction and Camerawork for a Special	Nominated	

== Analysis ==
Critics emphasized that The Eras Tour is a straightforward concert film and not a standard music documentary. They highlighted the absence of "docu-style elements"—such as interviews, behind-the-scenes or archived footage—in the film, calling it a concert film "in the true sense".

Several publications interpreted The Eras Tour as a cinematic tribute to Swift's music and her fandom. They attributed the film's success to its emphasis on communal experience and observed its feminist aspects, celebrating femininity and the female movie-going experience. Journalist Jo Ellison, writing for Financial Times, said that Swift's "supremacy" over the entertainment industry has resulted in much discourses over what her "secret sauce" could be, and opined that Swift "infuriates male critics by not looking like a sexpot".

== See also ==
- List of 2023 box office number-one films in the United States
- Impact of the Eras Tour
- Fearless Tour – debut concert tour by Swift
- The 1989 World Tour Live – 2015 concert film directed by Jonas Åkerlund about Swift's 2015 tour of the same name.
- Taylor Swift: Reputation Stadium Tour – 2019 concert film directed by Paul Dugdale about Swift's 2018 tour of the same name.
- Miss Americana – 2020 documentary film directed by Lana Wilson about Swift's life impacted by her career.
- Folklore: The Long Pond Studio Sessions – 2020 music-documentary film directed by Swift about her eighth studio album Folklore (2020).
