= The Archer (song) =

2019 song by Taylor Swift

Promotional single by Taylor Swift

from the album Lover
- Released: July 23, 2019
- Recorded: June 19, 2018
- Studio: Electric Lady (New York)
- Genre: Synth-pop; dream pop
- Length: 3:32
- Label: Republic
- Songwriters: Taylor Swift; Jack Antonoff
- Producers: Taylor Swift; Jack Antonoff

Lyric video
- "The Archer" on YouTube

"The Archer" is a song by the American singer-songwriter Taylor Swift from her seventh studio album, Lover (2019). She wrote and produced the track with Jack Antonoff, and Republic Records released it as a promotional single on July 23, 2019. The song has a 1990s-influenced minimalist, midtempo production and is a synth-pop ballad incorporating dense, echoing synthesizers and insistent kick drums. Music critics also identified the genre as dream pop with elements of synthwave. The lyrics are about Swift's acknowledgement of her past mistakes and contemplation of her identity.

"The Archer" peaked at number 38 on the US Billboard Hot 100 and in the top three on charts in Australia, Hungary, Lithuania, Scotland, and Singapore. It received certifications from Australia, Brazil, and the United Kingdom. Critics lauded the production and Swift's songwriting expressing vulnerability. Stereogum and Slant Magazine listed "The Archer" among the best songs of 2019. It was included in the set list of Swift's 2023–2024 concert tour, the Eras Tour. Since the Paris update, "The Archer" was removed from the set list. She performed the song two times as a surprise song with her other songs: "Question...?" (2022) at Amsterdam on July 4 and "You're on Your Own, Kid" (2022) at London on August 19.

== Release and live performances ==
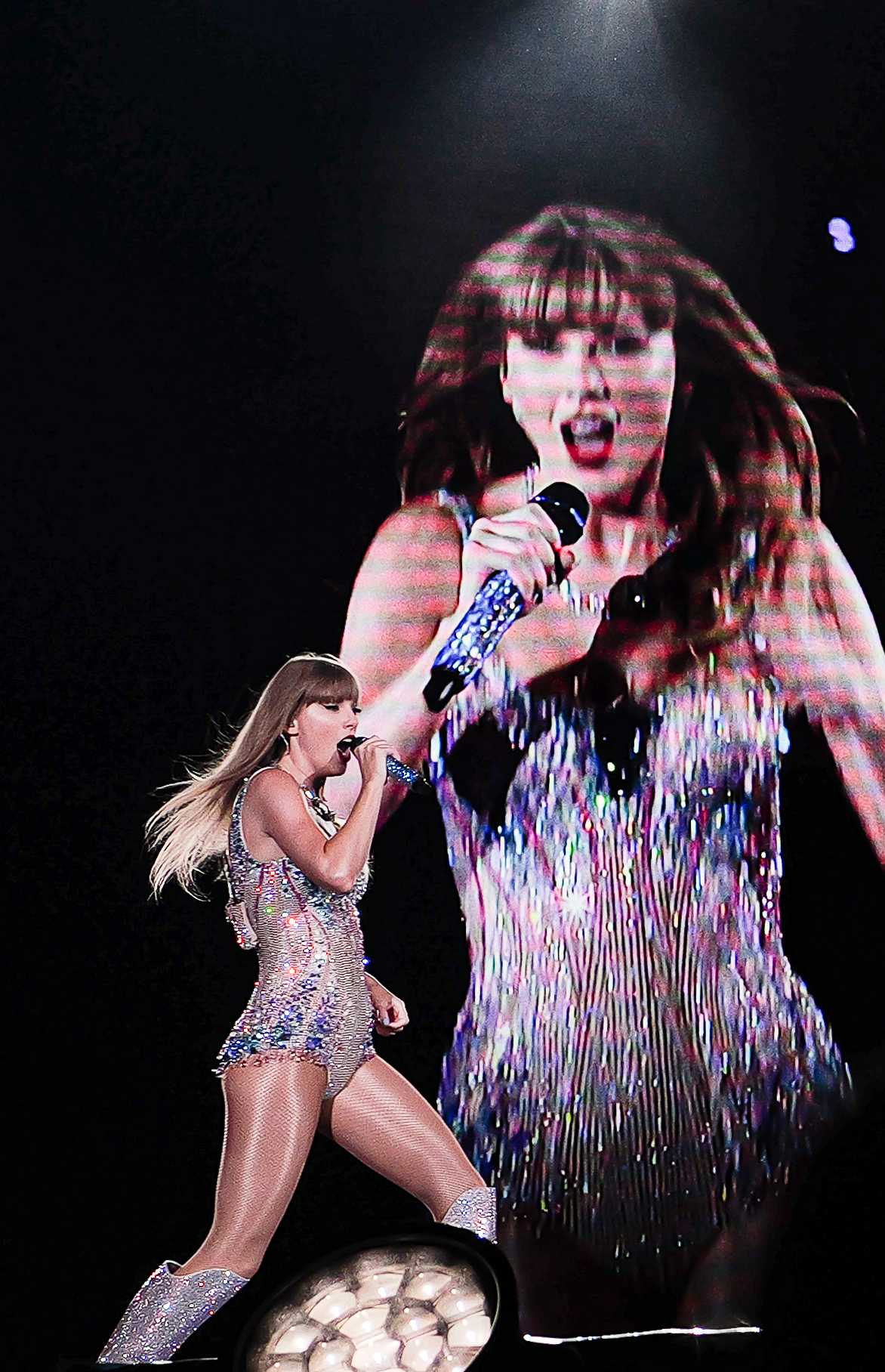
Swift performing "The Archer" on the Eras Tour in Inglewood, 2023

Taylor Swift conceived her seventh studio album, Lover, as a "love letter to love" itself that explores the many feelings evoked by love. It was inspired by the connection she felt to her fans during her Reputation Stadium Tour (2018). On July 23, 2019, the album's track listing on Apple Music revealed "The Archer" as the title of the fifth track. The same day, the song was released as a promotional single. A lyric video was released simultaneously. Regarding the placement of "The Archer" at number five on the album's track listing, Swift explained that it was the most "honest, emotional, vulnerable, and personal" track. Swift stated that the song was not an official single and was meant to showcase "another side" of the album.

She first performed "The Archer" as an acoustic rendition during a YouTube Q&A session called "Lover's Lounge" live streamed on August 22, 2019. The next day, she sang the track at SiriusXM's Town Hall event. The song was included in Swift's set lists for BBC Radio 1's Live Lounge on September 2, and her one-off City of Lover concert in Paris on September 9, 2019. The live recording at City of Lover, subtitled "Live from Paris", was released onto digital music platforms on May 18, 2020. Swift performed "The Archer" on the March 2023 to March 2024 dates for her sixth headlining tour, The Eras Tour, which was described as a tribute to all of her albums.

== Recording and composition ==
Swift wrote and produced "The Archer" with Jack Antonoff, a producer who had worked on her previous albums, 1989 (2014) and Reputation (2017). According to Antonoff, they completed the song within two hours while they were in California. Antonoff and Laura Sisk, assisted by John Rooney, recorded the track at Electric Lady Studios in New York City. It was mixed by Serban Ghenea at MixStar Studios in Virginia Beach, Virginia, and mastered by Randy Merrill at Sterling Sound in New York City.

"The Archer"
"The Archer" combines synth-pop and dream pop. It features dense, echoing synthesizers and persistent kick drums.

"The Archer" has a slow-burning production that gradually builds up. It is a minimalist, midtempo ballad that displays the sensibilities of 1980s music. The soundscape is driven by dense synthesizers drenched in echo and insistent kick drums. Antonoff programmed the drums using LinnDrum and the synthesizers with a Yamaha DX7 and a Juno-6. Music critics mostly categorized the genre as synth-pop. (Note: Attributed to NME's Nick Levine, No Ripcord's Ethan Beck, Vulture's Craig Jenkins, Billboard, and Toronto Star's Ben Rayner) Craig Jenkins of Vulture said that "The Archer" evoked a 1980s synth-pop torch song, and Time's Raisa Bruner described the synth sound as "skittering". Stephen Thomas Erlewine opined that the "glow of its retro analog synths" evoked the "chillier aspects" of late-1980s synth-pop.

In PopMatters, Preston Cram said that the "stripped-down" synth production was stylistically inspired by synthwave. Cram wrote that the track was "just a hair's breadth away from being fully classifiable as a synthwave song, or more specifically [...] dreamwave". Slant Magazine's Sal Cinquemani described it as "wistful, minimalist dream pop", Spin's Tosten Burks called it "dream pop-ish", and the Recording Academy's Ana Monroy Yglesias wrote that it conjectured a "dream-pop vibe". Rania Aniftos of Billboard described the sound as "airy", while NME's Nick Levine said that "The Archer" had an "airiness" that recalled Swift's "State of Grace" (2012) and a "repetition" that evoked "Out of the Woods" (2014).

== Lyrical interpretation ==
The title is a reference to Swift's zodiac sun-sign, Sagittarius. The lyrics are about Swift's reflection on her mistakes and contemplating on her identity and celebrity. In the first verse, she laments the downfall of her past relationships, platonic and romantic ("Cause cruelty wins in the movies/ I've got a hundred thrown-out speeches I almost said to you"). She then details how her relationships faded quickly ("Easy they come, easy they go/ I jump from the train, I ride off alone/ I never grew up, it's getting so old"). She delves into her fears and pleads with her audience: "All of my enemies started out friends/ Help me hold on to you."

The lyrics in the chorus ("I've been the archer, I've been the prey/ Who could ever leave me, darling / But who could stay?") generated interpretations as Swift's allusions to her personal relationships or her celebrity controversies and how she was both a victim and a starter of them. Swift explores her regret: "I cut off my nose just to spite my face/ And I hate my reflection for years and years." In the bridge, she interpolates lyrics from the nursery rhyme "Humpty Dumpty" ("All the king's horses, all the king's men/ Couldn't put me together again") to acknowledge the fragility of her identity and fame; Slate's Rhodes Murphy interpreted them as a warning "not to depend on cultural and institutional authorities [...] for validation".

Music critics considered the lyrics confessional and wrote that they displayed an introspective aspect of Swift's songwriting. (Note: Attributed to Time's Raisa Bruner, Slate's Rhodes Murphy, and American Songwriter's Alex Hopper) American Songwriter's Alex Hopper wrote that the song was akin to "a meandering late-night thought": "[Swift] poses many introspective questions and walks away with ambiguity." Variety's Chris Willman wrote that Swift portrayed her self-awareness and "the stock-taking is startling and sober". Kitty Empire of The Observer thought that the song revisited the idea of "Swift being a romantic handful" on her past songs such as "Blank Space" (2014). The intimate lyricism drew comparisons to Swift's "All Too Well" (2012).

== Critical reception ==
"The Archer" received acclaim from critics and fans after the lukewarm reception of Lover's first two singles, "Me!" and "You Need to Calm Down". NME's Sofiana Ramli wrote that whereas those two singles "boast saccharine melodies and catchy hooks", "The Archer" with its "minimalistic" production was a new direction. Willman said that the intimate lyricism was refreshing after the "mindful froth-pop" of the first two singles. "The Archer" was regarded as an album highlight by Spin's Jordan Sargent, MTV's Terron Moore, and No Ripcord's Ethan Beck. Vox's Constance Grady said the emotional engagement of "The Archer" was powerful. Sargent lauded Swift's songwriting about romance as being better than "any of her peers" in contemporary music.

The production received fairly positive reviews. Jon Caramanica of The New York Times thought that its production suggested new ways for Swift's artistry to evolve, citing her vocals: "she's restrained and a little imperious, using her voice as a mood piece." Cinquemani deemed it "quintessential Swift". Jenkins described the sound as "hooky without being fussy" and said that it was a direction he hoped Swift would explore further. Beck opined that Swift and Antonoff reached a "new high" for their collaboration with "The Archer", praising the insistent synths and kick drums that "[keep] building to a climax that never comes [...] beautifully catching an emotional moment in midair with no catharsis". Larry Fitzmaurice of Entertainment Weekly agreed that the track displayed Antonoff as a strong collaborator for Swift and regarded the sound as a "weightless beauty". Stereogum and Slant Magazine both ranked it sixth on their lists of the best songs of 2019.

"The Archer" featured on critics' rankings of Swift's songs in her catalog. Rob Sheffield of Rolling Stone placed "The Archer" 23rd on his 2023 ranking of 243 songs in Swift's discography, calling it "the ultimate Goth Tay powerhouse". The staff of Billboard featured it at number 58 on their 2023 list of the select 100 tracks by Swift. Nate Jones of Vulture ranked it 19th in his 2023 ranking of Swift's 214 songs; he deemed it a "cathartic self-examination" and praised the "throbbing production" that does not overwhelm the lyrical sentiments. Hannah Mylrea from NME placed it at number 47 out of 161 songs by Swift and appreciated the "remarkably vulnerable" lyricism. The staff of Slant Magazine ranked "The Archer" fourth on the 20 best tracks produced by Swift and Antonoff; the critic Jonathan Keefe said that the "melancholy" production created tension with the "violence" in Swift's lyrics, which allowed her to "escalate the song's intensity through one of her most evocative performances".

There were some less enthusiastic comments regarding the production. In Pitchfork, Anna Gaca wrote that "The Archer" successfully explored Swift's emotional depths but the 1980s-inspired sound co-produced by Antonoff was uninteresting. Clare Martin from Paste was disappointed by a "musical anticlimax" due to "the sugary-sweet synth reverb in the background [that] dissipates into nothing". The Independent's Alexandra Pollard and the Toronto Star's Ben Rayner opined that the constant build-up without reaching a climax turned out disappointing.

== Commercial performance ==
"The Archer" debuted at number 69 on the US Billboard Hot 100 and peaked at number 38 on the chart dated September 7, 2019, after the album Lover was released. Elsewhere, the song debuted on the charts in several territories and peaked within the top 50 of Scotland (17), Singapore (18), Hungary (22), Lithuania (23), Belgium (28), New Zealand (28), Ireland (31), Estonia (32), Canada (41), and further reaching Slovakia (63) and the Czech Republic (69). "The Archer" reached number 43 in the United Kingdom and received a gold certification from the British Phonographic Industry (BPI). The song peaked at number 19 in Australia and was certified double platinum by the Australian Recording Industry Association (ARIA). In Brazil, the track received a gold certification from Pro-Música Brasil.

== Personnel ==
Credits are adapted from the liner notes of Lover.

- Taylor Swift – vocals, songwriter, producer
- Jack Antonoff – producer, songwriter, recording engineer, keyboard, programming
- Laura Sisk – recording engineer
- John Rooney – assistant recording engineer
- Serban Ghenea – mixer
- John Hanes – mix engineer

== Charts ==
Chart performance for "The Archer"
Chart (2019)	Peak position
Australia (ARIA)	19
Belgium (Ultratip Bubbling Under Flanders)	28
Canada Hot 100 (Billboard)	41
China Airplay/FL (Billboard)	2
Czech Republic Singles Digital (ČNS IFPI)	69
Estonia (Eesti Ekspress)	32
Euro Digital Song Sales (Billboard)	16
France (SNEP Sales Chart)	38
Greece International (IFPI)	19
Hungary (Single Top 40)	22
Ireland (IRMA)	31
Lithuania (AGATA)	23
New Zealand (Recorded Music NZ)	28
Scottish Singles Sales (Official Charts)	17
Singapore (RIAS)	18
Slovakia Singles Digital (ČNS IFPI)	63
Sweden Heatseeker (Sverigetopplistan)	6
UK Singles (Official Charts)	43
US Billboard Hot 100	38
US Rolling Stone Top 100	23

== Certifications ==
Certifications for "The Archer"
Region	Certification	Certified units/sales
Australia (ARIA)	2× Platinum	140,000^{‡}
Brazil (Pro-Música Brasil)	Platinum	40,000^{‡}
New Zealand (RMNZ)	Platinum	30,000^{‡}
United Kingdom (BPI)	Gold	400,000^{‡}
^{‡} Sales+streaming figures based on certification alone.

== Release history ==
Release history and formats for "The Archer"
Region	Date	Format(s)	Version	Label	Ref.
Various	July 23, 2019	Digital download; streaming	Original	Republic	
Various	May 18, 2020	Digital download; streaming	Live	Republic	
