= List of 2026 box office number-one films in the United Kingdom =

This is a list of films which have placed number one at the weekend box office in the United Kingdom during 2026.

== Films ==
Week	Weekend End Date	Film	Total weekend gross (Pound sterling)	Weekend openings in the Top 10	Reference(s)
1	4 January 2026	Avatar: Fire and Ash (Note: Opened in 2025)	£4,427,062	Song Sung Blue (#7), Back to the Past (#9)	
2	11 January 2026	The Housemaid (Note: Opened in 2025)	£3,523,229	Hamnet (#2), Giant (#9), Labyrinth (#10)	
3	18 January 2026	28 Years Later: The Bone Temple	£3,376,384	Rental Family (#7), The Lord of the Rings: The Fellowship of the Ring (#8)	
4	25 January 2026	The Housemaid	£2,038,034	Saipan (#7), No Other Choice (#8), Mercy (#9), Return to Silent Hill (#10)	
5	1 February 2026	Hamnet	£1,412,612	Shelter (#3), Iron Lung (#4), Primate (#8), Is This Thing On? (#10)	
6	8 February 2026	Send Help	£1,593,703	Stray Kids: The Dominate Experience (#2)	
7	15 February 2026	Wuthering Heights	£7,665,295	Goat (#2), Crime 101 (#3), Stitch Head (#8), Whistle (#9)	
8	22 February 2026	Wuthering Heights	£3,878,031	The Secret Agent (#5), Cold Storage (#6), Wasteman (#8), The Moment (#9), Good Luck, Have Fun, Don't Die (#10)	
9	1 March 2026	Scream 7	£3,828,308	EPiC: Elvis Presley in Concert (#3), Audience - NT Live 2026 (#8), Pegasus 3 (#9), The Testament of Ann Lee (#10)	
10	8 March 2026	Hoppers	£4,789,170	The Bride! (#4), Mother's Pride (#5), Giselle - ROH London 2026 (#9), Othello (#10)	
11	15 March 2026	Hoppers	£2,288,827	Reminders of Him (#2), How to Make a Killing (#3)	
12	22 March 2026	Project Hail Mary	£7,403,542	Dhurandhar: The Revenge (#2), Ready or Not 2: Here I Come (#5), Aadu 3 (#6), The Good Boy (#10)	
13	29 March 2026	Project Hail Mary	£4,776,660	The Magic Faraway Tree (#2), They Will Kill You (#7), Bluey at the Cinema: Playdates with Friends (#8)	
14	5 April 2026	The Super Mario Galaxy Movie	£14,995,549	The Drama (#3), Fuze (#6), Vaazha II: Biopic of a Billion Bros (#8)	
15	12 April 2026	The Super Mario Galaxy Movie	£5,540,836	BTS World Tour 'Arirang' in Goyang: Live Viewing (#6), You, Me & Tuscany (#7), Undertone (#9), California Schemin' (#10)	
16	19 April 2026	The Super Mario Galaxy Movie	£2,552,081	Lee Cronin's The Mummy (#4), Akira (#5), Time Hoppers: The Silk Road (#7), All My Sons - NT Live 2026 (#9), Bhooth Bangla (#10)	
17	26 April 2026	Michael	£11,574,192	Rose of Nevada (#7), Exit 8 (#8), Fight Club (#9), The Magic Flute - ROH London 2026 (#10)	
18	3 May 2026	The Devil Wears Prada 2	£9,329,512	Hokum (#4), Patriot (#6), Eugene Onegin – Met Opera 2026 (#10)	
19	10 May 2026	The Devil Wears Prada 2	£5,203,067	The Sheep Detectives (#3), Billie Eilish – Hit Me Hard and Soft: The Tour (Live in 3D) (#4), Mortal Kombat II (#5), Iron Maiden: Burning Ambition (#8)	
20	17 May 2026	Michael	£4,432,922	Obsession (#4), Top Gun (#6), The Christophers (#7), Shrek (#9), Athiradi (#10)	
21	24 May 2026	Star Wars: The Mandalorian and Grogu	£5,291,385	Drishyam 3 (#5), Passenger (#7), Finding Emily (#8)	
22	31 May 2026	Backrooms	£4,281,936	Tuner (#7), Power Ballad (#9)	
23	7 June 2026	Scary Movie	£4,188,570	The Amazing Digital Circus: The Last Act (#2), Masters of the Universe (#3)	
24	14 June 2026	Disclosure Day	£5,504,987	BTS World Tour 'Arirang' in Busan: Live in Concert (#8)	
25	21 June 2026	Toy Story 5	£15,361,194	Cocktail 2 (#9)	
26	28 June 2026	Toy Story 5	£9,160,892	Supergirl (#2), Jackass: Best and Last (#4), Bleach: Thousand-Year Blood War - The Calamity (#7), Les Liaisons Dangereuses - NT Live (#9)	
27	5 July 2026	Toy Story 5	£5,725,337	Minions & Monsters (#2), The Invite (#3), Alpha (#9)	
28	12 July 2026	Moana	£2,875,065	Evil Dead Burn (#4), Dhamaal 4 (#10)	
29	19 July 2026	The Odyssey	£12,566,300		
30	26 July 2026	The Odyssey	£11,887,391	Jana Nayagan (#5)	
31	2 August 2026	Spider-Man: Brand New Day	£36,405,318	Ish (#9)	
32	9 August 2026	Spider-Man: Brand New Day	£12,048,458	Paw Patrol: The Dino Movie (#3), Andre Rieu's 2026 Summer Concert: Viva Maastricht! (#6), Ice Cream Man (#8)	
33	16 August 2026	Spider-Man: Brand New Day	£6,148,221	The End of Oak Street (#3), Katseye: Wild Hearts (#4), Tony (#8), Vishwanath & Sons (#10)	
34	23 August 2026	Spider-Man: Brand New Day	£3,605,191	Insidious: Out of the Further (#3), Spa Weekend (#5), Bethlehem Kudumba Unit (#7), Mutiny (#9)	
35	30 August 2026	Spider-Man: Brand New Day	£2,787,943	Coyote vs. Acme (#4), The Dog Stars (#5), Harry Potter and the Philosopher's Stone (#7), One Night Only (#9)	
36	6 September 2026	Spider-Man: Brand New Day	£1,635,798	The Death of Robin Hood (#7), Cars (#10)	
37	13 September 2026	Practical Magic 2	£2,798,771	Oasis: Don't Look Back in Anger (#2), Pressure (#3), Fall 2 (#6), Runner (#8), Raiders of the Lost Ark (#9)	
38	20 September 2026	Resident Evil	£4,211,819	Shaun the Sheep: The Beast of Mossy Bottom (#3), Bad Apples (#8), The Transformers: The Movie (#9)	
39	27 September 2026	Avengers Endgame: Encore	£4,123,123	Heart of the Beast (#3), Sense and Sensibility (#4), The Paradise (#10)	
40	4 October 2026	Verity	£3,396,610	Digger (#4), Drishyam: The Conclusion (#8)	
41	11 October 2026	Other Mommy	£1,969,621	The Social Reckoning (#5), The Uprising (#7)	
42	18 October 2026	Street Fighter	£2,313,689	Forgotten Island (#2), Jailer 2 (#3), Hadestown: The Musical (#6), Whalefall (#7)	
43	25 October 2026	Ghosts: The Possession of Button House	£2,458,995	Clayface (#2), Ali G: Who Iz I? (#3), Wildwood (#4), Fatherland (#9)	
44	1 November 2026	Wicker	£1,757,184	Primetime (#2)	
45	8 November 2026	Ramayana: Rise of a Legend	£2,148,158	Wild Horse Nine (#2), Godzilla Minus Zero (#3), George Michael: The Faith Tour (#5), I Play Rocky (#9), Stray Kids World Tour 'RUN IT' Live Viewing (#10)	
46	15 November 2026	Ebenezer	£3,961,852	La Bola Negra (#10)	

== Highest-grossing films ==
=== In-Year Release ===
Highest-grossing films of 2026 by In-year release
Rank	Title	Distributor	U.K. gross
1	Spider-Man: Brand New Day	Sony	£100,262,139
2	The Odyssey	Universal	£88,693,616
3	Toy Story 5	Disney	£59,003,867
4	Michael	Universal	£54,286,580
5	The Super Mario Galaxy Movie	Universal	£38,990,351
6	The Devil Wears Prada 2	Disney	£35,075,731
7	Project Hail Mary	Sony	£34,797,394
8	Wuthering Heights	Warner Bros.	£25,983,351
9	Minions & Monsters	Universal	£20,301,620
10	Obsession	Universal	£20,232,205

Highest-grossing films by BBFC rating of 2026
U	Minions & Monsters
PG	Toy Story 5
12A	Spider-Man: Brand New Day
15	The Odyssey
18	Obsession

== Notes ==
Preceded by 2025	2026	Succeeded by 2027
