= List of 2022 box office number-one films in the United Kingdom =

This is a list of films which have placed number one at the weekend box office in the United Kingdom during 2022.

== Films ==
†	This implies the highest-grossing movie of the year.

Week	Weekend End Date	Film	Total weekend gross (Pound sterling)	Weekend openings in the Top 10	Reference(s)
1	2 January 2022	Spider-Man: No Way Home (Note: Opened in 2021)	£6,055,345	The King's Man (#2), Titane (#9)	
2	9 January 2022	Spider-Man: No Way Home	£4,477,415	Licorice Pizza (#3), The 355 (#7)	
3	16 January 2022	Spider-Man: No Way Home	£3,215,166	Scream (#2)	
4	23 January 2022	Spider-Man: No Way Home	£2,335,488	Belfast (#2), Nightmare Alley (#4)	
5	30 January 2022	Sing 2	£6,867,533	Parallel Mothers (#6)	
6	6 February 2022	Sing 2	£5,149,645	Jackass Forever (#2), Moonfall (#4), Belle (#9)	
7	13 February 2022	Uncharted	£4,705,948	Death on the Nile (#3), Marry Me (#6)	
8	20 February 2022	Uncharted	£3,775,359	Dog (#4)	
9	27 February 2022	Uncharted	£3,084,101	The Duke (#3), Cyrano (#7), The Godfather (#10)	
10	6 March 2022	The Batman	£13,531,855	Ali & Ava (#9)	
11	13 March 2022	The Batman	£7,406,390	BTS Permission To Dance On Stage Seoul: Live Viewing (#3), Radhe Shyam (#9)	
12	20 March 2022	The Batman	£3,351,288	Jujitsu Kaisen 0 (#2), The Nan Movie (#4), The Phantom of the Open (#5), X (#7)	
13	27 March 2022	The Batman	£1,664,503	RRR (#2), Ambulance (#3), The Worst Person in the World (#7)	
14	3 April 2022	Sonic the Hedgehog 2	£4,986,334	Morbius (#2), The Bad Guys (#3)	
15	10 April 2022	Fantastic Beasts: The Secrets of Dumbledore	£5,884,934	The Outfit (#7)	
16	17 April 2022	The Lost City	£2,743,211	The Northman (#4), Operation Mincemeat (#5), Beast (#7), K.G.F: Chapter 2 (#8)	
17	24 April 2022	Sonic The Hedgehog 2	£1,637,442	The Unbearable Weight of Massive Talent (#7)	
18	1 May 2022	Downton Abbey: A New Era	£3,072,762	Acharya (#10)	
19	8 May 2022	Doctor Strange in the Multiverse of Madness	£19,765,718	Turandot - Met Opera 2022 (#9)	
20	15 May 2022	Doctor Strange in the Multiverse of Madness	£5,690,351	Everything Everywhere All at Once (#3), Little Mix Live - The Final Show (For Now...) (#5), Firestarter (#9)	
21	22 May 2022	Doctor Strange in the Multiverse of Madness	£2,968,358	Benediction (#10)	
22	29 May 2022	Top Gun: Maverick †	£15,931,497	The Bob's Burgers Movie (#5), F3 (#10)	
23	5 June 2022	Top Gun: Maverick †	£10,325,500	Men (#3), Vikram (#6)	
24	12 June 2022	Jurassic World Dominion	£12,121,728	Ante Sundaraniki (#10)	
25	19 June 2022	Jurassic World Dominion	£5,717,881	Lightyear (#3), Good Luck to You, Leo Grande (#4)	
26	26 June 2022	Elvis	£4,023,572	The Black Phone (#5), Jug Jugg Jeeyo (#6), George Michael Freedom Uncut (#9)	
27	3 July 2022	Minions: The Rise of Gru	£10,424,758	Nitram (#10)	
28	10 July 2022	Thor: Love and Thunder	£12,283,719	London Nahi Jaunga (#8), Brian and Charles (#9), Dr Who: Classic Movie Double Bill (#10)	
29	17 July 2022	Thor: Love and Thunder	£4,063,773	The Railway Children Return (#6)	
30	24 July 2022	Minions: The Rise of Gru	£3,086,374	Where the Crawdads Sing (#3), Prima Facie - NT Live 2022 (#6)	
31	31 July 2022	DC League of Super-Pets	£2,694,626	Dirty Dancing (#7)	
32	7 August 2022	Bullet Train	£2,858,197	Westlife: Live from Wembley Arena (#8)	
33	14 August 2022	Nope	£1,859,338	Laal Singh Chaddha (#7)	
34	21 August 2022	Nope	£1,147,639	Dragon Ball Super: Super Hero (#5), Fisherman's Friends: One and All (#6), Orphan: First Kill (#10)	
35	28 August 2022	Andre Rieu’s 2022 Maastricht Summer Concert	£798,706	Beast (#2)	
36	4 September 2022	Minions: The Rise of Gru	£1,056,163	Spider-Man: No Way Home (#5), E.T. The Extra Terrestrial (#7), Three Thousand Years of Longing (#10)	
37	11 September 2022	See How They Run	£1,163,484	Tad the Lost Explorer and the Curse of the Mummy (#2), Jaws (#3), Brahmastra: Part One - Shiva (#4), Bodies Bodies Bodies (#7)	
38	18 September 2022	See How They Run	£984,779	Moonage Daydream (#10)	
39	25 September 2022	Ticket to Paradise	£2,085,615	Don't Worry Darling (#2), Avatar (#3)	
40	2 October 2022	Smile	£1,860,452	Mrs. Harris Goes to Paris (#4), Ponniyin Selvan: I (#5)	
41	9 October 2022	Smile	£1,715,678	The Woman King (#2), Amsterdam (#5), The Lost King (#7)	
42	16 October 2022	Lyle, Lyle, Crocodile	£2,783,562	Halloween Ends (#2), The Legend of Maula Jatt (#9), Emily (#10)	
43	23 October 2022	Black Adam	£5,655,003	The Banshees of Inisherin (#2), Decision to Leave (#6)	
44	30 October 2022	Black Adam	£3,488,800	Prey for the Devil (#4), Live Broadcast from Buenos Aires (#5), Harry Potter and the Chamber of Secrets (#7), Barbarian (#8), Triangle of Sadness (#10)	
45	6 November 2022	Black Adam	£2,006,821	Living (#4), One Piece Film: Red (#5)	
46	13 November 2022	Black Panther: Wakanda Forever	£12,363,870		
47	20 November 2022	Black Panther: Wakanda Forever	£6,190,593	The Menu (#2), Aftersun (#7), Listy Do M5 (#8), Drishyam 2 (#9), Matthew Bourne's Nutcracker! (#10)	
48	27 November 2022	Matilda the Musical	£4,135,318	Strange World (#3), She Said (#4), Bones and All (#6), A Christmas Carol - A Ghost Story (#10)	
49	4 December 2022	Matilda the Musical	£2,531,782	Violent Night (#3)	
50	11 December 2022	Matilda the Musical	£2,102,866	Elf (#6), The Nutcracker - ROH, London 2022 (#7), Home Alone (#8), The Muppet Christmas Carol (#9), The Polar Express (#10)	
51	18 December 2022	Avatar: The Way of Water	£11,187,562	It's a Wonderful Life (#8)	
52	25 December 2022	Avatar: The Way of Water	£4,974,004	Love Actually (#3)	

== Highest-grossing films ==
=== In-Year Release ===
Highest-grossing films of 2022 by In-year release
Rank	Title	Distributor	U.K. gross
1.	Top Gun: Maverick	Paramount	£83,575,590
2.	Avatar: The Way of Water	Disney	£76,922,252
3.	Minions: The Rise of Gru	Universal	£46,096,257
4.	Doctor Strange in the Multiverse of Madness	Disney	£42,082,100
5.	The Batman	Warner Bros.	£40,820,268
6.	Thor: Love And Thunder	Disney	£37,369,361
7.	Jurassic World Dominion	Universal	£35,103,831
8.	Black Panther: Wakanda Forever	Disney	£34,345,903
9.	Sing 2	Universal	£32,790,416
10.	Roald Dahl’s Matilda the Musical	Sony	£28,570,605

Highest-grossing films by BBFC rating of 2022
U	Minions: The Rise of Gru
PG	Roald Dahl's Matilda the Musical
12A	Top Gun: Maverick
15	The Batman
18	Smile

== See also ==
- List of British films

Preceded by 2021	2022	Succeeded by 2023
