= List of 2025 box office number-one films in the United Kingdom =

This is a list of films which have placed number one at the weekend box office in the United Kingdom during 2025.

== Films ==
†	This implies the highest-grossing movie of the year.

Week	Weekend End Date	Film	Total weekend gross (Pound sterling)	Weekend openings in the Top 10	Reference(s)
1	6 January 2025	Nosferatu	£5,246,910	We Live in Time (#3)	
2	12 January 2025	Mufasa: The Lion King	£2,201,919	Babygirl (#5), A Real Pain (#6)	
3	19 January 2025	A Complete Unknown	£2,616,302	Wolf Man (#7)	
4	26 January 2025	A Complete Unknown	£1,667,821	Flight Risk (#4), The Brutalist (#5), Presence (#10)	
5	2 February 2025	A Complete Unknown	£1,236,908	Companion (#3), Hard Truths (#9)	
6	9 February 2025	Dog Man	£3,252,536	Macbeth: David Tennant and Cush Jumbo (#4), September 5 (#5), Becoming Led Zeppelin (#8)	
7	16 February 2025	Bridget Jones: Mad About the Boy	£12,298,966	Captain America: Brave New World (#2), Heart Eyes (#4), Chhaava (#8)	
8	23 February 2025	Bridget Jones: Mad About the Boy	£6,893,703	The Monkey (#4), I'm Still Here (#6), The Importance of Being Earnest - NT Live 2025 (#8)	
9	2 March 2025	Bridget Jones: Mad About the Boy	£4,130,747	The Last Showgirl (#5), Attack on Titan: The Last Attack (#6), Jesus Christ Superstar: Live Arena Tour (#10)	
10	9 March 2025	Mickey 17	£2,132,080	Marching Powder (#3), One of Them Days (#7), Anora (#8), Conclave (#10)	
11	16 March 2025	Mickey 17	£1,246,946	Black Bag (#3), Last Breath (#7), Fidelio - Met Opera 2025 (#10)	
12	23 March 2025	Snow White	£3,856,173	Ne Zha 2 (#2), Flow (#6), The Alto Knights (#7)	
13	30 March 2025	Snow White	£2,015,179	L2: Empuraan (#2), A Working Man (#3), Novocaine (#5), Billy Elliott: The Musical Live (#8), Dr. Strangelove - NT Live 2025 (#10)	
14	6 April 2025	A Minecraft Movie †	£15,013,136	Six The Musical (#2), Death of a Unicorn (#4), Mr Burton (#10)	
15	13 April 2025	A Minecraft Movie †	£7,201,921	The Amateur (#2), Andre Rieu's 75th Birthday Celebration: The Dream Continues (#4), Drop (#6), The Chosen: The Last Supper (#7) Good Bad Ugly (#8)	
16	20 April 2025	A Minecraft Movie †	£5,037,316	Sinners (#2), The Penguin Lessons (#3), Warfare (#5), Kesari Chapter 2 (#10)	
17	27 April 2025	A Minecraft Movie †	£2,492,087	Star Wars: Episode III - Revenge of the Sith (#3), The Accountant 2 (#4), Pink Floyd - Live at Pompeii MCMLXXII (#5), Until Dawn (#6), Thudarum (#9)	
18	4 May 2025	Thunderbolts*	£5,979,242	Bluey at the Cinema: Let's Play Chef Collection (#7), Retro (#8), HIT: The Third Case (#9)	
19	11 May 2025	Thunderbolts*	£2,362,481	David Attenborough: Ocean (#4), The Surfer (#7)	
20	18 May 2025	Final Destination: Bloodlines	£4,009,856	Hurry Up Tomorrow (#6), Hallow Road (#8), Ateez World Tour (Towards the Light: Will to Power) (#9)	
21	25 May 2025	Lilo & Stitch	£9,568,923	Mission: Impossible - The Final Reckoning (#2), The Phoenician Scheme (#4), Narivetta (#10)	
22	1 June 2025	Lilo & Stitch	£6,139,573	Karate Kid: Legends (#3), The Salt Path (#4), Peppa Meets the Baby Cinema Experience (#5), Doctor Who - The Two Episode Finale (#8)	
23	8 June 2025	Lilo & Stitch	£3,528,384	Ballerina (#3), Clown in a Cornfield (#8), Thug Life (#10)	
24	15 June 2025	How to Train Your Dragon	£8,145,188	The Ballad of Wallis Island (#8)	
25	22 June 2025	28 Years Later	£4,780,374	Elio (#3), Sitaare Zameen Par (#7)	
26	29 June 2025	F1	£7,071,647	M3GAN 2.0 (#6), Sardaar Ji 3 (#8)	
27	6 July 2025	Jurassic World Rebirth	£12,493,782	The Ballad of Wallis Island (#10)	
28	13 July 2025	Superman	£6,992,902		
29	20 July 2025	Superman	£4,877,459	Smurfs (#4), I Know What You Did Last Summer (#5), Saiyaara (#10)	
30	27 July 2025	The Fantastic Four: First Steps	£8,144,593	The Bad Guys 2 (#3)	
31	3 August 2025	The Fantastic Four: First Steps	£3,098,336	The Naked Gun (#2), Bring Her Back (#6), Chal Mera Putt 3 (#10)	
32	10 August 2025	Weapons	£2,818,535	Freakier Friday (#2), Stans (#10)	
33	17 August 2025	Weapons	£1,557,828	Materialists (#2), Coolie (#3), Together (#8), War 2 (#9), Nobody 2 (#10)	
34	24 August 2025	Weapons	£1,147,166	The Life of Chuck (#6), Jurassic World Rebirth (#8), Eddington (#10)	
35	31 August 2025	The Roses	£2,183,190	Jaws (#2), Caught Stealing (#6), Andre Rieu's 2025 Maastricht Concert: Waltz the Night Away! (#7), Harry Potter and the Goblet of Fire (#8), Lokah Chapter 1: Chandra (#10)	
36	7 September 2025	The Conjuring: Last Rites	£6,777,552	Inter Alia - NT Live (#9), Honey Don't! (#10)	
37	14 September 2025	Downton Abbey: The Grand Finale	£4,390,303	Demon Slayer: Kimetsu no Yaiba – The Movie: Infinity Castle (#2), The Long Walk (#4), Spinal Tap II: The End Continues (#7), Next to Normal (#10)	
38	21 September 2025	Downton Abbey: The Grand Finale	£2,267,004	A Big Bold Beautiful Journey (#6), The Sound of Music (#9), Tesciowie 3 (#10)	
39	28 September 2025	One Battle After Another	£2,471,783	Hamilton (#2), The Strangers - Chapter 2 (#7), They Call Him OG (#8)	
40	5 October 2025	Taylor Swift: The Official Release Party of a Showgirl	£3,471,544	The Smashing Machine (#4), Kantara: Chapter 1 (#6), Him (#8) Avatar: The Way of Water (#10)	
41	12 October 2025	Tron: Ares	£1,790,651	I Swear (#3), Night of the Zoopocalypse (#7), Good Boy (#8)	
42	19 October 2025	Gabby's Dollhouse: The Movie	£1,901,289	Black Phone 2 (#2), Roofman (#6), Good Fortune (#7), After the Hunt (#9)	
43	26 October 2025	Springsteen: Deliver Me from Nowhere	£1,306,626	Regretting You (#2), Chainsaw Man - The Movie: Reze Arc (#3), Pets on a Train (#8)	
44	2 November 2025	Bugonia	£986,194	Back to the Future (#3)	
45	9 November 2025	Predator: Badlands	£2,376,779	The Choral (#2), Die My Love (#5), A Paw Patrol Christmas (#9)	
46	16 November 2025	Now You See Me: Now You Don't	£2,384,018	The Running Man (#2), Nuremberg (#4), Jujutsu Kaisen: Execution (#5), Christmas Karma (#7)	
47	23 November 2025	Wicked: For Good	£18,858,825		
48	30 November 2025	Wicked: For Good	£7,713,860	Zootropolis 2 (#2), Westlife - 25th anniversary concert (#4), Pillion (#5), The Fifth Step - NT Live 2025 (#8)	
49	7 December 2025	Zootropolis 2	£4,235,672	Five Nights at Freddy's 2 (#2), Andre Rieu's 2025 Christmas Concert: Merry Christmas (#4), Eternity (#5), Dhurandhar (#7), Kill Bill: The Whole Bloody Affair (#8), It Was Just an Accident (#9)	
50	14 December 2025	Zootropolis 2	£2,767,509	Fackham Hall (#5), The Nutcracker - ROH London 2025 (#6), Silent Night, Deadly Night (#8), Home Alone (#10)	
51	21 December 2025	Avatar: Fire and Ash	£9,015,976	The Polar Express (#8), It's a Wonderful Life (#9), Bha Bha Ba (#10)	
52	28 December 2025	Avatar: Fire and Ash	£6,062,546	The Housemaid (#2), The SpongeBob Movie: Search for SquarePants (#3), Marty Supreme (#5), Anaconda (#6), Sentimental Value (#9)	

== Highest-grossing films ==
=== In-Year Release ===
Highest-grossing films of 2025 by In-year release
Rank	Title	Distributor	U.K. gross
1	A Minecraft Movie	Warner Bros.	£56,446,431
2	Wicked: For Good	Universal	£47,164,566
3	Bridget Jones: Mad About the Boy	Universal	£46,381,049
4	Avatar: Fire and Ash	Disney	£42,296,161
5	Lilo & Stitch	Disney	£36,429,863
6	Zootropolis 2	Disney	£36,007,025
7	Jurassic World Rebirth	Universal	£35,909,602
8	The Housemaid	Lionsgate	£31,721,141
9	Superman	Warner Bros.	£27,833,281
10	Mission: Impossible - The Final Reckoning	Paramount	£26,354,145

Highest-grossing films by BBFC rating of 2025
U	Lilo & Stitch
PG	A Minecraft Movie
12A	Avatar: Fire and Ash
15	Bridget Jones: Mad About the Boy
18	Weapons

Preceded by 2024	2025	Succeeded by 2026
