= List of 2023 box office number-one films in the United Kingdom =

This is a list of films which have placed number one at the weekend box office in the United Kingdom during 2023.

== Films ==
†	This implies the highest-grossing movie of the year.

Week	Weekend End Date	Film	Total weekend gross (Pound sterling)	Weekend openings in the Top 10	Reference(s)
1	1 January 2023	Avatar: The Way of Water (Note: Opened in 2022)	£7,643,764	Whitney Houston: I Wanna Dance with Somebody (#2), Corsage (#6), The Amazing Maurice (#7)	
2	8 January 2023	Avatar: The Way of Water	£5,870,063	A Man Called Otto (#4), Andre Rieu In Dublin 2023 (#5), Till (#6)	
3	15 January 2023	Avatar: The Way of Water	£4,162,171	M3GAN (#2), Empire of Light (#3), Varisu (#7), Tár (#8), Thunivu (#9)	
4	22 January 2023	Avatar: The Way of Water	£2,789,760	Babylon (#3)	
5	29 January 2023	Avatar: The Way of Water	£2,116,615	Pathaan (#2), Plane (#3), The Fabelmans (#4), The Wandering Earth II (#9), Billie Eilish: Live at the O2 (#10)	
6	5 February 2023	Puss in Boots: The Last Wish	£4,950,495	Knock at the Cabin (#3), The Whale (#5), BTS: Yet to Come In Cinemas (#8)	
7	12 February 2023	Puss in Boots: The Last Wish	£3,066,908	Magic Mike's Last Dance (#2), Titanic (#3), Epic Tails (#9)	
8	19 February 2023	Ant-Man and the Wasp: Quantumania	£8,834,435	Women Talking (#8)	
9	26 February 2023	Ant-Man and the Wasp: Quantumania	£3,049,939	Cocaine Bear (#3), What's Love Got to Do with It? (#4), Broker (#8)	
10	5 March 2023	Creed III	£5,003,452	Demon Slayer: Kimetsu no Yaiba - To the Swordsmith Village (#6), Heaven in Hell (#10)	
11	12 March 2023	Scream VI	£3,043,922	65 (#3), Champions (#8), Tu Jhoothi Main Makkaar (#9)	
12	19 March 2023	Shazam! Fury of the Gods	£2,397,953	Allelujah (#4), Rye Lane (#7)	
13	26 March 2023	John Wick: Chapter 4	£5,321,533	Louis Tomlinson: All of Those Voices (#8), 80 For Brady (#9)	
14	2 April 2023	Dungeons & Dragons: Honour Among Thieves	£3,544,354	Mummies (#3)	
15	9 April 2023	The Super Mario Bros. Movie	£15,691,810	Air (#4), The Pope's Exorcist (#5)	
16	16 April 2023	The Super Mario Bros. Movie	£7,568,523	Renfield (#5), Suzume (#6), Der Rosenkavalier - Met Opera 2023 (#10)	
17	23 April 2023	The Super Mario Bros. Movie	£4,271,315	Evil Dead Rise (#2), Missing (#6), Kisi Ka Bhai Kisi Ki Jaan (#8), The Three Musketeers: D'Artagnan (#10)	
18	30 April 2023	The Super Mario Bros. Movie	£3,067,431	The Unlikely Pilgrimage of Harold Fry (#3), Ponniyin Selvan: II (#4), Return of the Jedi (#7), Polite Society (#9)	
19	7 May 2023	Guardians of the Galaxy Vol. 3	£12,079,820	Jodi (#9), Return to Seoul (#10)	
20	14 May 2023	Guardians of the Galaxy Vol. 3	£5,349,346	Love Again (#3), Book Club: The Next Chapter (#4), 2018 (#6), Eurovision - Grand Final Live (#7)	
21	21 May 2023	Fast X	£5,895,674	Are You There God? It's Me, Margaret. (#4), Beau is Afraid (#5), Don Giovanni - Met Opera 2023 (#9)	
22	28 May 2023	The Little Mermaid	£5,012,929	Hypnotic (#5), Sisu (#6), Tomorrow X Together Again (#8), Sleeping Beaty - ROH London 2023 (#9)	
23	4 June 2023	Spider-Man: Across the Spider-Verse	£9,159,823	The Boogeyman (#5), SUGA - August D Your 'D-Day' in Japan (#7), Die Zauberflote - Met Opera 2023 (#8), Reality (#9), Zara Hatke Zara Bachke (#10)	
24	11 June 2023	Spider-Man: Across the Spider-Verse	£4,062,817	Transformers: Rise of the Beasts (#2), Chevalier (#8), Maurh (#9), War Pony (#10)	
25	18 June 2023	The Flash	£4,252,532	Greatest Days (#5), Adipurush (#6)	
26	25 June 2023	Spider-Man: Across the Spider-Verse	£1,995,517	No Hard Feelings (#3), Asteroid City (#4)	
27	2 July 2023	Indiana Jones and the Dial of Destiny	£7,144,441	Ruby Gillman, Teenage Kraken (#3), Carry on Jatta 3 (#9), Satyaprem Ki Katha (#10)	
28	9 July 2023	Elemental	£3,049,002	Insidious: The Red Door (#3)	
29	16 July 2023	Mission: Impossible – Dead Reckoning Part One	£10,391,016		
30	23 July 2023	Barbie †	£18,509,235	Oppenheimer (#2)	
31	30 July 2023	Barbie †	£13,226,848	Talk to Me (#5), Rocky Aur Rani Kii Prem Kahaani (#7), Bro (#10)	
32	6 August 2023	Barbie †	£7,916,261	Meg 2: The Trench (#3), Teenage Mutant Ninja Turtles: Mutant Mayhem (#4), Joy Ride (#7)	
33	13 August 2023	Barbie †	£4,428,044	Gran Turismo (#4), Haunted Mansion (#5), Jailer (#7), Gadar 2 (#10)	
34	20 August 2023	Barbie †	£2,697,820	Blue Beetle (#3), Strays (#5)	
35	27 August 2023	Barbie †	£1,944,777	Andre Rieu's 2023 Maastricht Concert: Love is All Around (#5), The Blackening (#9)	
36	3 September 2023	The Equalizer 3	£2,783,302	Sound of Freedom (#4), Cobweb (#10)	
37	10 September 2023	The Nun II	£1,743,903	Jawan (#2), Past Lives (#5), My Big Fat Greek Wedding 3 (#7)	
38	17 September 2023	A Haunting in Venice	£2,186,930		
39	24 September 2023	A Haunting in Venice	£1,472,237	Expend4bles (#2), Dumb Money (#5), Beauty and the Beast (#10)	
40	1 October 2023	The Creator	£2,255,034	Saw X (#2), A Little Life (#6), Stop Making Sense (#7), The Old Oak (#10)	
41	8 October 2023	The Exorcist: Believer	£1,677,878	The Great Escaper (#4), BlackBerry (#10)	
42	15 October 2023	Taylor Swift: The Eras Tour	£5,729,998	PAW Patrol: The Mighty Movie (#2), Sumotherhood (#4), The Miracle Club (#9), Frozen (#10)	
43	22 October 2023	Trolls Band Together	£3,051,810	Killers of the Flower Moon (#2), Leo (#4)	
44	29 October 2023	Five Nights at Freddy's	£5,379,587		
45	5 November 2023	Trolls Band Together	£1,829,764	Bottoms (#7)	
46	12 November 2023	The Marvels	£3,465,783	Anatomy of a Fall (#5), Dream Scenario (#6)	
47	19 November 2023	The Hunger Games: The Ballad of Songbirds & Snakes	£5,420,681	Tiger 3 (#3), Saltburn (#4), Thanksgiving (#6), Kevin Bridges - The Long Overdue Catch-Up (#7)	
48	26 November 2023	Napoleon	£5,235,706	Wish (#3), Cliff Richard: The Blue Sapphire Tour 2023 (#6), Love Actually (#10)	
49	3 December 2023	Napoleon	£1,908,971	Renaissance: A Film By Beyonce (#4), Animal (#6), Elf (#8)	
50	10 December 2023	Wonka	£8,904,750	Home Alone (#8), The Peasants (#10)	
51	17 December 2023	Wonka	£6,362,786	Godzilla Minus One (#2), The Nutcracker - ROH London 2023 (#8)	
52	24 December 2023	Wonka	£7,214,019	Aquaman and the Lost Kingdom (#2), Dunki (#3), Salaar: Part 1 - Ceasefire (#5), It's a Wonderful Life (#9), The Polar Express (#10)	
53	31 December 2023	Wonka	£6,672,464	Ferrari (#2), The Boy and the Heron (#4), Anyone but You (#5), Next Goal Wins (#7)	

== Highest-grossing films ==
=== In-Year Release ===
Highest-grossing films of 2023 by In-year release
Rank	Title	Distributor	U.K. gross
1.	Barbie	Warner Bros.	£95,718,030
2.	Wonka	Warner Bros.	£63,518,580
3.	Oppenheimer	Universal	£59,550,749
4.	The Super Mario Bros. Movie	Universal	£54,578,335
5.	Guardians of the Galaxy Vol. 3	Disney	£36,718,384
6.	Spider-Man: Across the Spider-Verse	Sony	£30,366,099
7.	The Little Mermaid	Disney	£27,448,310
8.	Mission: Impossible – Dead Reckoning Part One	Paramount	£26,579,966
9.	Puss in Boots: The Last Wish	Universal	£25,912,381
10.	Indiana Jones and the Dial of Destiny	Disney	£20,388,019

Highest-grossing films by BBFC rating of 2023
U	Trolls Band Together
PG	Wonka
12A	Barbie
15	Oppenheimer
18	Scream VI

== Notes ==
Preceded by 2022	2023	Succeeded by 2024
