= You're on Your Own, Kid =

2022 song by Taylor Swift

Song by Taylor Swift

from the album Midnights
- Released: October 21, 2022
- Studio: Rough Customer (Brooklyn); Electric Lady (New York)
- Genre: Alternative pop; alternative rock; pop rock; synth-pop
- Length: 3:14
- Label: Republic
- Songwriters: Taylor Swift; Jack Antonoff
- Producers: Taylor Swift; Jack Antonoff

Lyric video
- "You're on Your Own, Kid" on YouTube

"You're on Your Own, Kid" is a song by the American singer-songwriter Taylor Swift from her tenth studio album, Midnights (2022). Swift wrote and produced the song with Jack Antonoff. With a production combining alternative rock and synth-pop sounds, "You're on Your Own, Kid" is an upbeat song with muted guitars and synthesizers that gradually build up. In the lyrics, a narrator reflects on her coming of age, on how she dealt with an unrequited love and her career ambitions.

Music critics lauded the track for what they deemed a vulnerable yet hopeful message in its lyrics, several have considered it a highlight from Midnights and a fan favorite. They interpreted "You're on Your Own, Kid" as Swift's reflection of her celebrity and personal life, including an eating disorder she suffered. Commercially, it charted in the top 10 of the charts in Australia, Canada, Ireland, Malaysia, the Philippines, Singapore, and the United States, and peaked at number seven on the Billboard Global 200. Swift occasionally performed "You're on Your Own, Kid" on her Eras Tour in 2023–2024.

== Background and release ==
After announcing her tenth studio album, Midnights, on August 28, 2022, she unveiled its cover artwork on social media but kept its track listing undisclosed. On September 21, 2022, Swift announced a thirteen-episode series called Midnights Mayhem with Me on the social media platform TikTok, and thereafter revealed the title of one album track each episode. The tenth episode was released a few days later, in which Swift revealed the fifth track from the album, "You're on Your Own, Kid". "You're on Your Own, Kid", alongside the thirteen announced tracks and additional surprise-released tracks for the 3am edition of Midnights, was released on October 21, 2022, under Republic Records. The "Strings Remix" of the song was included on the CD version of the Lavender Edition of the album.

== Composition ==
=== Production ===
Swift wrote and produced "You're on Your Own, Kid" with Jack Antonoff, who programmed the track and played instruments including percussion, Juno 6, Mellotron, Moog, electric guitars, and bass. Additional musicians were Evan Smith, who played synthesizers and recorded his performance at Pleasure Hill Recording, Portland, Maine; and Sean Hutchinson, who played drums and recorded his performance at Hutchinson Sound, Brooklyn. The track was recorded by Antonoff and Laura Sisk at Rough Customer Studio, Brooklyn, and Electric Lady Studios, New York City. It was mixed by Serban Ghenea, assisted by Bryce Bordone, at MixStar Studios, Virginia Beach, Virginia, and mastered by Randy Merrill at Sterling Sound, Edgewater, New Jersey. On the vinyl editions, the track was mastered by Evan Smith at Sterling Sound, Nashville, Tennessee.

"You're on Your Own, Kid"
"You're on Your Own, Kid" begins with muted beats, plucked guitars, and subtle synths that gradually build up. It incorporates alternative pop, alternative rock, pop rock, and synth-pop.

"You're on Your Own, Kid" lasts for three minutes and 14 seconds. The song features persistent electric guitar strums throughout. It begins with soft, muted percussion beats, plucked guitars, and subtle synthesizers, which gradually build up. In the refrains, after the lyrics, "You're on your own kid, you always have been", the instrumental comes to a halt, contrasting with what Slant Magazine's Paul Attard found to be a "relentless pre-chorus". In reviews of Midnights, critics described the genre as alternative pop, alternative rock, and pop rock. The Rolling Stone critic Rob Sheffield, in a ranking of Swift's songs, called "You're on Your Own, Kid" a synth-pop track reminiscent of the music by the rock band New Order. Ilana Kaplan from the Alternative Press described the production as 1990s-alt-rock-tinged.

=== Lyrical interpretation ===
The lyrics address a narrator's reflection on her coming of age. It has been widely interpreted as a song documenting Swift's rise to fame. The narrator reminisces about her teenage years in her hometown, where she dreamt of getting out and found solace in songwriting as a means to create her own fantasy. The first verse has her recalling an unrequited love in the past: "Summer went away / Still the yearning stays / I play it cool with the best of them / I wait patiently / He's gonna notice me / It's ok, we're the best of friends." Time's Shannon Carlin found this to be in line with the theme of unrequited love in Swift's previous songs including "You Belong with Me" and "Hey Stephen" from Fearless (2008). The second verse sees her moving on from the boy and chasing her career aspirations, just to realize; "My dreams aren't rare." When she returns for a homecoming, her friends ignore her and have moved on with their lives. Towards the end, the song concludes with a hopeful message of self-reflection. The narrator looks around in a "blood-soaked gown" and reckons that every misstep was a lesson learnt: "So make the friendship bracelets / Take the moment and taste it / You've got no reason to be afraid." The Guardian critic Alexis Petridis wrote the "blood-soaked gown" imagery evokes the 1976 horror film Carrie.

Critics interpreted "You're on Your Own, Kid" as Swift's self-reflection on her past and journey to celebrity. In Vulture, Craig Jenkins thought Swift's "lilting" vocals and references to her early-career days harken back to her 2008 album Fearless, both stylistically and thematically. PopMatters's Matthew Dwyer considered the song Swift's contemplation about her legacy in the music industry, citing the lyric, "I gave my blood, sweat, and tears for this." John Wohlmacher from Beats Per Minute found the lyrics dark but the musical composition somewhat brighter, and so "it feels like Swift is using pop music to cast a shadow over the brightly illuminated truths within her lyrics". For Atwood Magazine's Nic Nichols, "You're on Your Own, Kid" shares similar themes with Swift's 2008 song "Fifteen". The lines, "I hosted parties and starved my body / Like I'd be saved by a perfect kiss", were deciphered as her mentioning her eating disorder, which is also documented in Miss Americana (2020).

== Critical reception ==
"You're On Your Own, Kid" received widespread acclaim from music critics. Stephen Thompson of NPR praised the lyrics' specificity and imagery, and the "gorgeous" melody that showcases Swift's talents as a great songwriter. Attard considered "You're on Your Own, Kid" one of the Midnights tracks that best display the "matured temperament and the stark intimacy of Swift's songwriting", and Petridis selected it among the songs that are "filled with subtle, brilliant touches". In Slate, the critic Carl Wilson dubbed "You're on Your Own, Kid" one of the album tracks that showcase emotional acuity. Kate Solomon from the i praised the track as the album's most emotionally affecting. Paste's Ellen Johnson complimented it for a rich narrative that avoids being "overly wordy or sappy", which she found superior to mainstream pop songs. In Variety, Chris Willman ranked "You're on Your Own, Kid" at number 49 on his list of the best 50 songs from Swift's repertoire, specifically praising the lyrics. Alex Hopper of American Songwriter viewed the song as a fan-favorite and picked it as one of Midnights' best tracks.

== Commercial performance ==
Following the release of Midnights, tracks of the album occupied the entire top 10 of the US Billboard Hot 100; "You're on Your Own, Kid" opened at number eight on the chart, with 34.1 million streams, 1,500 downloads, and 498,000 airplay impressions. The tracks made Swift the first artist to occupy the top 10 of the Hot 100 and the woman with the most top-10 entries (40), surpassing Madonna (38). It peaked at number six on the Canadian Hot 100 and was certified platinum by Music Canada. In the United Kingdom, the song reached number 65 on the UK Singles Chart and received a platinum certification from the British Phonographic Industry (BPI).

Elsewhere, "You're on Your Own, Kid" debuted on numerous territories, and peaked within the top 40 of Australia (6), Ireland (6), the Philippines (6), Singapore (6), Malaysia (7), Iceland (13), Portugal (13), Vietnam (13), Croatia (18), India (19), South Africa (19), New Zealand (20), Luxembourg (22), Lithuania (24), the Czech Republic (26), Sweden (27), Switzerland (27), Slovakia (32), Norway (34), Hungary (36), Spain (39), and Denmark (40), and further reaching Italy (82), Argentina (98), and France (107). The song ultimately debuted and peaked at number seven on the Billboard Global 200.

== Live performances ==
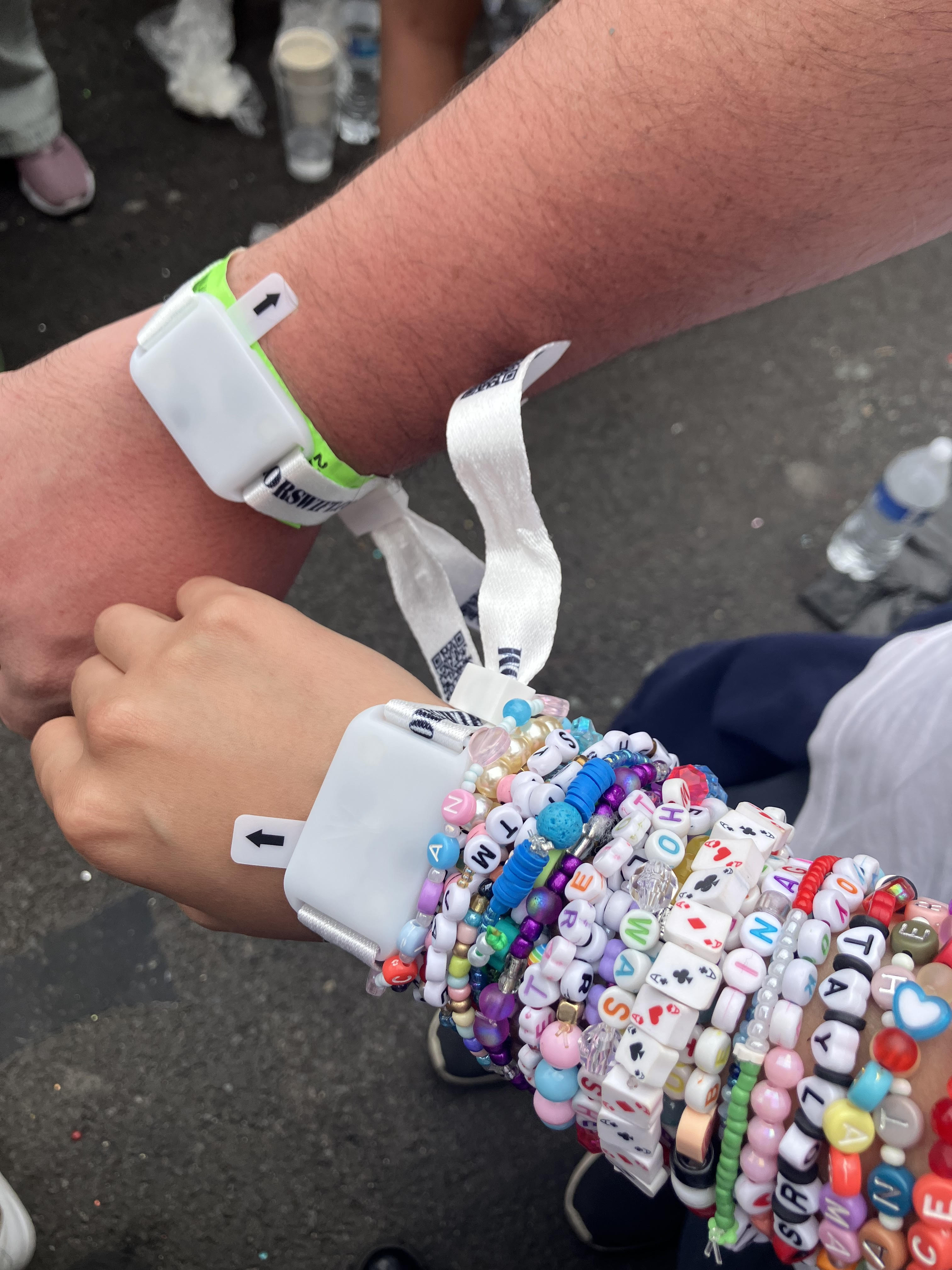
The song's lyrics prompted concertgoers attending the Eras Tour to make and trade friendship bracelets (pictured).

Swift occasionally performed "You're on Your Own, Kid" as a "surprise song" outside the regular set list on several dates of the Eras Tour. In 2023, she sang the song in Tampa, Florida (April 14), Los Angeles, California (August 5), and Mexico City, Mexico (August 26). In 2024, she performed it as a full song in Tokyo, Japan (February 10) and Dublin, Ireland (June 30) and as part of mashups with "Fifteen" in Singapore (March 7) and Lyon, France (June 2), with "Long Live" in Lisbon, Portugal (May 25), with "State of Grace" in Dublin, Ireland (June 28), with "The Archer" in London, England (August 19), and with "Long Story Short" in Toronto, Ontario, Canada (November 16).

The song was also one of the "surprise songs" featured in the tour's accompanying concert film. The "friendship bracelets" lyric in "You're on Your Own, Kid" prompted fans and concertgoers who attended the Eras Tour to make their own bracelets that spelled out the titles of Swift's songs and other colloquialisms.

== Personnel ==
- Taylor Swift – vocals, songwriter, producer
- Jack Antonoff – songwriter, producer, programming, assistant mix engineer, percussion, Juno 6, Mellotron, Moog, electric guitars, bass, background vocals, recording
- Evan Smith – synths, recording, mastering for vinyl
- Laura Sisk – recording
- Sean Hutchinson – drums, percussion, recording
- Megan Searl – assistant engineer
- Jon Sher – assistant engineer
- John Rooney – assistant engineer
- Serban Ghenea – mix engineer
- Bryce Bordone – assistant mix engineer
- Randy Merrill – mastering engineer

== Charts ==
Chart performance for "You're on Your Own, Kid"
| Chart (2022–2023) | Peak position |
|---|---|
| Argentina Hot 100 (Billboard) | 98 |
| Australia (ARIA) | 6 |
| Canada Hot 100 (Billboard) | 6 |
| Croatia (Billboard) | 18 |
| Czech Republic Singles Digital (ČNS IFPI) | 26 |
| Denmark (Tracklisten) | 40 |
| France (SNEP) | 107 |
| Global 200 (Billboard) | 7 |
| Greece International (IFPI) | 10 |
| Hungary (Stream Top 40) | 36 |
| Iceland (Tónlistinn) | 13 |
| India International Singles (IMI) | 19 |
| Italy (FIMI) | 82 |
| Ireland (IRMA) | 6 |
| Lebanon English (Lebanese Top 20) | 18 |
| Lithuania (AGATA) | 24 |
| Luxembourg (Billboard) | 22 |
| Malaysia (Billboard) | 11 |
| Malaysia International (RIM) | 7 |
| New Zealand (Recorded Music NZ) | 20 |
| Norway (VG-lista) | 34 |
| Philippines (Billboard) | 6 |
| Portugal (AFP) | 13 |
| Singapore (RIAS) | 6 |
| Slovakia Airplay (ČNS IFPI) | 32 |
| South Africa (RISA) | 19 |
| Spain (Promusicae) | 39 |
| Sweden (Sverigetopplistan) | 27 |
| Swiss Streaming (Schweizer Hitparade) | 27 |
| UK Singles (Official Charts) | 65 |
| US Billboard Hot 100 | 8 |
| Vietnam Hot 100 (Billboard) | 13 |

== Certifications ==
Certifications for "You're on Your Own, Kid"
| Region | Certification | Certified units/sales |
|---|---|---|
| Australia (ARIA) | 2× Platinum | 140,000^{‡} |
| Brazil (Pro-Música Brasil) | Platinum | 40,000^{‡} |
| Canada (Music Canada) | Platinum | 80,000^{‡} |
| New Zealand (RMNZ) | Platinum | 30,000^{‡} |
| Spain (Promusicae) | Gold | 30,000^{‡} |
| United Kingdom (BPI) | Platinum | 600,000^{‡} |
^{‡} Sales+streaming figures based on certification alone.
