= State of Grace (song) =

2012 song by Taylor Swift

Promotional single by Taylor Swift

from the album Red
- Released: October 16, 2012
- Studio: Blackbird (Nashville)
- Genre: Arena rock
- Length: 4:55
- Label: Big Machine
- Songwriter: Taylor Swift
- Producers: Taylor Swift; Nathan Chapman

Audio video
- "State of Grace" on YouTube

"State of Grace" is a song written and recorded by the American singer-songwriter Taylor Swift for her fourth studio album, Red. To promote the album before its release, Big Machine Records released "State of Grace" for download on October 16, 2012. Produced by Swift and Nathan Chapman, it is an arena rock song that uses chiming, feedback-drenched guitars and pounding drums. An acoustic version features as a deluxe-edition bonus track. The lyrics are about the tumultuous feelings evoked by the first signs of love.

Critics deemed the song's arena-rock production a showcase of Swift's expanding artistry beyond her previous country pop sound. They praised the production and emotional sentiments and retrospectively regarded it as one of Swift's best songs. "State of Grace" peaked within the top 50 of singles charts in Australia, Ireland, New Zealand, and the United Kingdom. It reached number nine on the Canadian Hot 100 and number 13 on the Billboard Hot 100, and received a gold certification from the Recording Industry Association of America (RIAA).

Swift performed "State of Grace" on the Red Tour (2013–2014) and occasionally on her later tours. Following a 2019 dispute regarding the ownership of Swift's masters, she re-recorded the song as "State of Grace (Taylor's Version)", as part of Red's re-recording, Red (Taylor's Version) (2021). "State of Grace (Taylor's Version)" peaked within the top 10 of singles charts in Ireland, Canada, and Singapore.

== Background and production ==
Taylor Swift wrote her third studio album, Speak Now, entirely herself and produced it with Nathan Chapman, who had produced both of her previous albums. Released in October 2010, Speak Now continued the country pop sound of Swift's previous records, with a radio-friendly pop crossover production and elements from various rock subgenres of the 1970s and 1980s decades.

On Speak Now's follow-up Red, Swift wanted to experiment beyond country pop and worked with different producers. Chapman remained a key collaborator on Red—he and Swift produced eight tracks, including "State of Grace". It was one of the first songs she wrote in Nashville, Tennessee, before she went to Los Angeles to enlist other producers. "State of Grace" was recorded by the audio engineers Brian David Willis, Chad Carlson, and Matt Rausch, and it was mixed by Justin Niebank, at Blackbird Studio, Nashville. Hank Williams mastered the track at Nashville's MasterMix studio.

== Release and live performances ==
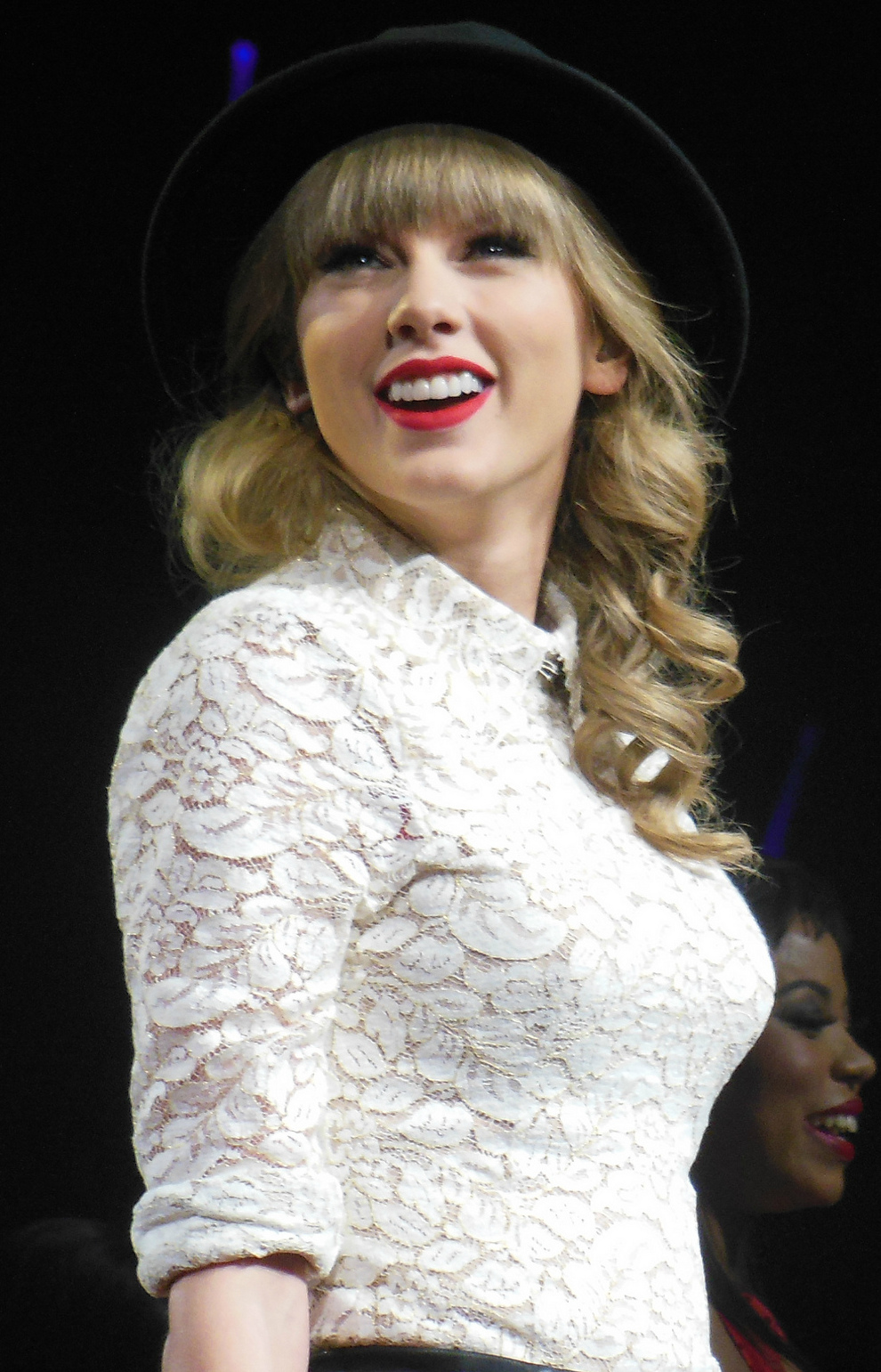
Swift performed "State of Grace" as the opening number on the Red Tour (2013–2014).

From September 24, 2012, to promote Red, Big Machine Records released on the iTunes Store one track each week until the album's October 22 release date as part of a four-week release countdown. "State of Grace" was released as the fourth promotional single from Red on October 16. An acoustic version, also produced by Swift and Chapman, was released as a deluxe-edition bonus track. "State of Grace" charted in the top 50 of singles charts in New Zealand (20), the United Kingdom (36), Ireland (43), and Australia (44). The song peaked at number nine on the Canadian Hot 100 and at number 13 on the US Billboard Hot 100. In June 2017, it received a gold certification from the Recording Industry Association of America, which denotes 500,000 track-equivalent units based on sales and on-demand streaming.

Swift performed "State of Grace" live for the first time on November 15, 2012, during the second season of the U.S. version of The X Factor. She included it in her set list for the Z100 Jingle Ball at Madison Square Garden, New York City, on December 7, 2012. It was the opening number on the set list to Swift's Red Tour (2013–2014). Swift performed "State of Grace" as a "surprise song" during the July 10, 2018, concert in Landover, Maryland, as part of her Reputation Stadium Tour. On the Eras Tour (2023–2024), Swift sang the track during the March 18, 2023, concert in Glendale, Arizona, as a mashup with her 2022 song "You're on Your Own, Kid" at the June 28, 2024, concert in Dublin, Ireland, and as a mashup with her 2022 song "Labyrinth" at the November 21, 2024, concert in Toronto, Canada.

== Music and lyrics ==
"State of Grace"
An arena rock song, "State of Grace" features feedback-drenched guitars, pounding drums, and Swift singing with elongated syllables.

"State of Grace" runs for 4 minutes and 55 seconds. It is an arena rock song that expands on the rock stylings of Speak Now with a production that critics described as "epic" and "massive". The track uses chiming, feedback-drenched guitars and pounding drums. (Note: As described by Spin's Marc Hogan, Entertainment Weekly's Grady Smith, and Billboard's Jason Lipshutz) Swift sings loudly and with elongated syllables. According to the musicologist James E. Perone, the track has a 1980s-college-rock throwback feel, a guitar sound evoking the style of U2's band member the Edge, and a melodic quality reminiscent of the Australian rock band Men at Work (specifically citing their song "Who Can It Be Now?" as a reference point). Some journalists compared the song's style to that of U2's album The Joshua Tree (1987). (Note: Attributed to Hogan and the Los Angeles Times' Randall Roberts)

The lyrics are about the many possibilities of how a romance could proceed and the tumultuous feelings evoked by the first signs of love. As Red's opening track, "State of Grace" sets the tone for an album about broken relationships and the conflicting emotions that ensue. It starts with pounding drums and vague lyrics about heartbreak; "We fall in love 'til it hurts or bleeds / or fades in time." In the second verse, the beats halt and Swift sings; "We are alone, just you and me / Up in your room and our slates are clean / Just twin fire signs / four blue eyes." After the second verse, fast-paced drums and loud guitars propel in the background. The narrator admits that the lover is not a "saint" and she has "loved in shades of wrong", and in the refrain admits, "And I never saw you coming/ And I'll never be the same." The track concludes with a realization, "Love is a ruthless game unless you play it good and right." The acoustic version relies on soft guitar and gentle drum notes to highlight Swift's vocals, which The A.V. Club's Saloni Gajjar described as "velvety".

Some critics highlighted the maturity of Swift's songwriting. In Spin, Marc Hogan found the lyrics uplifting because Swift does not seek revenge for a failed relationship in the lines; "And I never saw you coming / And I'll never be the same". In a review for The Atlantic, Brad Nelson said Swift introduced more nuances to the narrative than those in her previous love songs; after "clichéd" lyrics at the beginning, she "gets writerly" with the second verse using "the kind of details that detach from a narrative and stretch over it like clouds", reminding Nelson of the work of Steely Dan songwriters Walter Becker and Donald Fagen.

== Critical reception ==
Upon its release, "State of Grace" received positive reviews from critics, many of whom immediately deemed the arena-rock sound impactful and said it showcased a new aspect to Swift's artistry. (Note: Attributed to Hogan, Lipshutz, Smith, the Los Angeles Times' August Brown, and The Detroit News' Adam Graham) In album reviews of Red, some critics picked "State of Grace" as a highlight for what they described as a compelling production and a confident delivery. (Note: Attributed to Spin's Michael Robbins, and the Telegram & Gazette's Craig S. Semon) Bernard Perusse from the Edmonton Journal and Randall Roberts from the Los Angeles Times found "State of Grace" a worthwhile experimentation. In a less enthusiastic review, Ben Rayner of the Toronto Star criticized it for "shamelessly knocking off U2 for a shot at rock-radio play". Jonathan Keefe from Slant Magazine and Sean Daly of the Tampa Bay Times felt the production led to a diminishing quality of Swift's songwriting, but the latter remarked that it was "bold regardless".

Retrospective reviews of "State of Grace" have also been positive, and several critics picked it as an example of Swift's artistic versatility and a high point on Red. (Note: Attributed to Pitchfork's Brad Nelson, i's Kate Solomon, American Songwriter's Alex Hopper, and the Alternative Press's Kelsey Barnes) Jordan Sargent of Spin described its production as a "thematically perfect musical [composition], unhurried as if to marinate on the moment but also fleetingly epic". On critics' rankings of Swift's entire catalog, the track was ranked in the top 10 by the staff of Billboard, Hannah Mylrea of NME, Jane Song of Paste, and Nate Jones of Vulture, all lauding the arena-rock sound that Swift has since not recreated. Jason Lipshutz from Billboard admired what he deemed a concise hook and an exhilarating production, and he proclaimed "State of Grace" as one of Swift's most enduring non-singles. The track featured on Billboard's 2017 list of the "100 Best Deep Cuts by 21st Century Pop Stars", and its editor Andrew Unterberger praised the refrain for "[saying] everything it needs to say in so few syllables".

== Personnel ==
Credits adapted from the liner notes of Red

- Taylor Swift – vocals, songwriter, producer
- Nathan Chapman – producer, guitar
- Justin Niebank – mixer
- Brian David Willis – engineer
- Chad Carlson – engineer
- Matt Rausch – engineer
- Hank Williams – mastering engineer
- Drew Bollman – assistant mixer
- Leland Elliott – assistant recording engineer
- Nick Buda – drums
- Eric Darken – percussion

== Charts ==
Weekly chart performance
Chart (2012)	Peak position
Australia (ARIA)	44
Canada Hot 100 (Billboard)	9
Ireland (IRMA)	43
New Zealand (Recorded Music NZ)	20
UK Singles (Official Charts)	36
US Billboard Hot 100	13

== Certifications ==
Certifications
Region	Certification	Certified units/sales
Australia (ARIA)	Gold	35,000^{‡}
United States (RIAA)	Gold	500,000^{‡}
^{‡} Sales+streaming figures based on certification alone.

== "State of Grace (Taylor's Version)" ==
"State of Grace (Taylor's Version)"

Song by Taylor Swift

from the album Red (Taylor's Version)
- Released: November 12, 2021
- Studio: Blackbird (Nashville)
- Length: 4:55
- Label: Republic
- Songwriter: Taylor Swift
- Producers: Taylor Swift; Christopher Rowe

Lyric video
- "State of Grace (Taylor's Version)" on YouTube

After signing a new contract with Republic Records, Swift began re-recording her first six studio albums in November 2020. The decision came after a 2019 public dispute between Swift and the talent manager Scooter Braun, who acquired Big Machine Records, including the masters of Swift's albums the label had released. By re-recording them, Swift had full ownership of the new masters, including the copyright licensing of her songs, devaluing the Big Machine-owned masters.

The re-recordings of "State of Grace" and the acoustic version, both subtitled "(Taylor's Version)", were released as part of Red's re-recording, Red (Taylor's Version), on November 12, 2021. Both "State of Grace (Taylor's Version)" and "State of Grace (Acoustic Version) (Taylor's Version)" were produced by Swift and Christopher Rowe, and it was recorded by David Payne at Blackbird Studio, Nashville. Rowe recorded Swift's vocals at Kitty Committee Studio in Belfast, Northern Ireland, and Serban Ghenea mixed both tracks at MixStar Studios, Virginia Beach, Virginia. The drums on the re-recorded version are more defined.

Reviewing Red (Taylor's Version), Keefe appreciated how the reworked instrumentation gave the track a stronger emotional resonance. "State of Grace (Taylor's Version)" debuted on several countries: it peaked within the top 25 of Ireland (7), Canada (9), Singapore (10), New Zealand (12), the United Kingdom (18), the United States (18), and Australia (25), and further reached South Africa (77) and Portugal (89). The song charted at number 12 on the Billboard Global 200.

=== Personnel ===
Credits adapted from the liner notes of Red (Taylor's Version)

- Taylor Swift – lead vocals, background vocals, songwriter, producer
- Christopher Rowe – producer, vocals engineer
- David Payne – recording engineer
- Dan Burns – additional engineer
- Austin Brown – assistant engineer, assistant editor
- Bryce Bordone – engineer
- Derek Garten – engineer, editor
- Serban Ghenea – mixer
- Amos Heller – bass guitar
- Matt Billingslea – drums, percussion, vibraphone
- Max Bernstein – electric guitar
- Mike Meadows – electric guitar, synthesizers
- Paul Sidoti – electric guitar
- Jonathan Yudkin – strings

=== Charts ===
Weekly chart performance for "Taylor's Version"
Chart (2021)	Peak position
Australia (ARIA)	25
Canada (Canadian Hot 100)	9
Global 200 (Billboard)	12
Ireland (IRMA)	7
New Zealand (Recorded Music NZ)	12
Portugal (AFP)	89
Singapore (RIAS)	10
South Africa (RISA)	77
UK Singles (Official Charts)	18
US Billboard Hot 100	18

=== Certifications ===
Certifications for "Taylor's Version"
Region	Certification	Certified units/sales
Australia (ARIA)	Gold	35,000^{‡}
New Zealand (RMNZ)	Gold	15,000^{‡}
United Kingdom (BPI)	Silver	200,000^{‡}
^{‡} Sales+streaming figures based on certification alone.
