= List of 2024 box office number-one films in the United Kingdom =

This is a list of films which have placed number one at the weekend box office in the United Kingdom during 2024.

== Films ==
†	This implies the highest-grossing movie of the year.

Week	Weekend End Date	Film	Total weekend gross (Pound sterling)	Weekend openings in the Top 10	Reference(s)
1	7 January 2024	Wonka (Note: Opened in 2023)	£3,779,635	One Life (#2), Priscilla (#3), Night Swim (#9)	
2	14 January 2024	Wonka	£2,227,606	Poor Things (#2), The Beekeeper (#5), The Boys in the Boat (#10)	
3	21 January 2024	Mean Girls	£3,251,159	The Holdovers (#6), Queen Rock Montreal (#9)	
4	28 January 2024	Mean Girls	£1,496,629	All of Us Strangers (#2), Fighter (#7), The Color Purple (#8)	
5	4 February 2024	Migration	£3,577,675	Argylle (#2), The Zone of Interest (#5), American Fiction (#10)	
6	11 February 2024	Migration	£2,468,390	The Iron Claw (#3), Peppa's Cinema Party (#5), Dune (#10)	
7	18 February 2024	Bob Marley: One Love	£6,950,773	Madame Web (#3), The Taste of Things (#10)	
8	25 February 2024	Bob Marley: One Love	£2,387,019	Wicked Little Letters (#2), Demon Slayer: Kimetsu no Yaiba - To the Hashira Training (#4), Vanya - NT Live 2024 (#6)	
9	3 March 2024	Dune: Part Two	£9,279,080	Manjummel Boys (#7), Perfect Days (#9), Sami Swoi Poczatek (#10)	
10	10 March 2024	Dune: Part Two	£5,851,155	Imaginary (#5), Shaitaan (#6), Titanic the Musical (#7)	
11	17 March 2024	Dune: Part Two	£4,046,492	Drive-Away Dolls (#6), Monster (#7), Oppenheimer (#9)	
12	24 March 2024	Ghostbusters: Frozen Empire	£4,056,097	Immaculate (#3), Late Night with the Devil (#7), The Motive and the Cue - NT Live 2024 (#8), Romeo et Juliette - Met Opera 2023/24 (#10)	
13	31 March 2024	Kung Fu Panda 4	£5,020,600	Godzilla x Kong: The New Empire (#2), Mothers' Instinct (#6), Crew (#8)	
14	7 April 2024	Kung Fu Panda 4	£2,834,711	Monkey Man (#5), The First Omen (#6), Seize Them! (#8), Luca (#10)	
15	14 April 2024	Back to Black	£2,772,698	Civil War (#2), Aavesham (#9), Bade Miyan Chote Miyan (#10)	
16	21 April 2024	Back to Black	£1,897,014	Abigail (#5), Varshangalkku Shesham (#9)	
17	28 April 2024	Challengers	£1,607,094	Spy x Family Code: White (#8)	
18	5 May 2024	The Fall Guy	£3,598,996	Star Wars: Episode I - The Phantom Menace (#2), Tarot (#6), Love Lies Bleeding (#8), Macbeth: Ralph Fiennes and Indira Varma (#10)	
19	12 May 2024	Kingdom of the Planet of the Apes	£3,802,189	La chimera (#8), Madama Butterfly - Met Opera 2023/24 (#9)	
20	19 May 2024	IF	£2,435,054	The Strangers: Chapter 1 (#4), Guruvayoor Ambalanadayil (#6), 42nd Street - The Musical (#8)	
21	26 May 2024	The Garfield Movie	£2,121,270	Furiosa: A Mad Max Saga (#2), Turbo (#8), Twilight of the Warriors: Walled In (#9)	
22	2 June 2024	IF	£1,570,568	Harry Potter and the Prisoner of Azkaban (#6), Haikyu!! The Dumpster Battle (#7), Sting (#8)	
23	9 June 2024	Bad Boys: Ride or Die	£3,873,533	The Watched (#6), The Dead Don't Hurt (#8)	
24	16 June 2024	Inside Out 2	£11,321,387	Wilding (#9), Freud's Last Session (#10)	
25	23 June 2024	Inside Out 2	£7,762,903	The Bikeriders (#2), Doctor Who - The Two Episode Finale (#4), Rite Here Rite Now (#5), The Exorcism (#9), Something in the Water (#10)	
26	30 June 2024	Inside Out 2	£6,003,526	A Quiet Place: Day One (#2), Kalki 2898 AD (#3), Kinds of Kindness (#6), Jatt & Juliet 3 (#7), Horizon: An American Saga – Chapter 1 (#8)	
27	7 July 2024	Inside Out 2	£5,127,182	MaXXXine (#4)	
28	14 July 2024	Despicable Me 4	£8,856,183	Longlegs (#3), Fly Me to the Moon (#4), Indian 2 (#6), In a Violent Nature (#10)	
29	21 July 2024	Despicable Me 4	£4,925,773	Twisters (#2), Bad Newz (#7), Blur: To the End (#8)	
30	28 July 2024	Deadpool & Wolverine	£17,276,621	Raayan (#7), I Saw the TV Glow (#9)	
31	4 August 2024	Deadpool & Wolverine	£8,021,084	Harold and the Purple Crayon (#5), Spider-Man (#7), Blackpink World Tour [Born Pink] In Cinemas (#9), My Neighbour Totoro (#10)	
32	11 August 2024	It Ends with Us	£4,516,760	Trap (#4), Borderlands (#5), Spider-Man 2 (#10)	
33	18 August 2024	Alien: Romulus	£3,741,287	Coraline (#4), Stree 2 (#9)	
34	25 August 2024	Alien: Romulus	£2,021,921	Kneecap (#5), Blink Twice (#6), The Crow (#8)	
35	1 September 2024	Despicable Me 4	£1,244,979	Andre Rieu's 2024 Maastricht Concert: Power of Love (#5), AfrAId (#10)	
36	8 September 2024	Beetlejuice Beetlejuice	£7,352,760	The Greatest of All Time (#2), Star Wars: Episode III - Revenge of the Sith (#9), Firebrand (#10)	
37	15 September 2024	Beetlejuice Beetlejuice	£4,272,202	Speak No Evil (#2), Lee (#3), Prima Facie - NT Live 2022 (#4), The Critic (#7), Ajayante Randam Moshanam (#10)	
38	22 September 2024	Beetlejuice Beetlejuice	£2,458,216	The Substance (#3), Interstellar (#5), 200% Wolf (#7)	
39	29 September 2024	Beetlejuice Beetlejuice	£1,822,714	The Outrun (#3), Devara: Part 1 (#4), Megalopolis (#7), Shaun of the Dead (#9), Never Let Go (#10)	
40	6 October 2024	Joker: Folie à Deux	£5,674,029	Return of the Jedi (#9), A Different Man (#10)	
41	13 October 2024	Transformers One	£1,691,298	Terrifier 3 (#3), Vettaiyan (#5), Salem's Lot (#6), Buffalo Kids (#7)	
42	20 October 2024	The Wild Robot	£3,256,572	Smile 2 (#2), The Apprentice (#3), My Hero Academia: You're Next (#9), Alice's Adventures in Wonderland - ROH London 2024 (#10)	
43	27 October 2024	Venom: The Last Dance	£4,299,477	The Room Next Door (#8)	
44	3 November 2024	The Wild Robot	£2,179,601	Heretic (#3), Small Things like These (#4), Anora (#6), Bhool Bhulaiyaa 3 (#7), Singham Again (#9), Juror #2 (#10)	
45	10 November 2024	Paddington in Peru	£9,649,984	Red One (#2), Blitz (#8), Piece by Piece (#10)	
46	17 November 2024	Gladiator II	£9,155,050	Kiss Me, Kate: The Musical (#8), The Last Dance (#9), Andrea Bocelli 30: The Celebration (#10)	
47	24 November 2024	Wicked †	£13,696,056	Tasca - Met Opera 2024 (#8), Listy Do M. 6 (#9)	
48	1 December 2024	Moana 2	£12,021,342	Conclave (#5), All We Imagine as Light (#7), The Polar Express (#9)	
49	8 December 2024	Moana 2	£6,904,866	Pushpa 2: The Rule (#5), Andre Rieu's Christmas Concert: Gold and Silver (#6), Nightbitch (#9), Solo Leveling - ReAwakening (#10)	
50	15 December 2024	Moana 2	£3,613,290	Kraven the Hunter (#5), The Lord of the Rings: The War of the Rohirrim (#7), Queer (#8)	
51	22 December 2024	Mufasa: The Lion King	£4,415,961	Ivanov/Wright The Nutcracker - ROH 2024 (#7), It's a Wonderful Life (#9)	
52	29 December 2024	Sonic the Hedgehog 3	£11,760,314	Better Man (#5), Baby John (#9)	

== Highest-grossing films ==
=== In-Year Release ===
Highest-grossing films of 2024 by In-year release
Rank	Title	Distributor	U.K. gross
1	Wicked	Universal	£61,440,670
2	Inside Out 2	Disney	£58,916,081
3	Deadpool & Wolverine	Disney	£57,590,607
4	Despicable Me 4	Universal	£48,267,201
5	Moana 2	Disney	£42,357,963
6	Dune: Part Two	Warner Bros.	£39,466,555
7	Paddington in Peru	StudioCanal	£36,854,328
8	Mufasa: The Lion King	Disney	£33,285,488
9	Gladiator II	Paramount	£32,029,485
10	Sonic the Hedgehog 3	Paramount	£26,413,201

Highest-grossing films by BBFC rating of 2024
U	Inside Out 2
PG	Wicked
12A	Dune: Part Two
15	Deadpool & Wolverine
18	Poor Things

== Notes ==
Preceded by 2023	2024	Succeeded by 2025
