= List of 2021 box office number-one films in the United Kingdom =

This is a list of films which have placed number one at the weekend box office in the United Kingdom during 2021.

== Films ==
| † | This implies the highest-grossing movie of the year. |

| Week | Weekend End Date | Film | Total weekend gross (Pound sterling) | Weekend openings in the Top 10 | Reference(s) |
|---|---|---|---|---|---|
| 1–20 | 3 January 2021 – 16 May 2021 | British cinemas closed and box office reporting suspended due to the COVID-19 pandemic | | | |
| 21 | 23 May 2021 | Peter Rabbit 2: The Runaway | £4,605,673 | Nomadland (#2), Godzilla vs. Kong (#3), Spiral: From The Book Of Saw (#4), The Unholy (#5), Mortal Kombat (#6), Those Who Wish Me Dead (#7), Raya and the Last Dragon (#8), Tom & Jerry (#9), Ammonite (#10) | |
| 22 | 30 May 2021 | The Conjuring: The Devil Made Me Do It | £2,708,455 | Cruella (#3), Demon Slayer: Mugen Train (#4) | |
| 23 | 6 June 2021 | A Quiet Place Part II | £3,567,048 | Dream Horse (#5) | |
| 24 | 13 June 2021 | A Quiet Place Part II | £1,314,938 | Nobody (#5), The Father (#6) | |
| 25 | 20 June 2021 | Hitman's Wife's Bodyguard | £1,636,128 | In the Heights (#3), Monster Hunter (#9) | |
| 26 | 27 June 2021 | Fast & Furious 9 | £6,014,132 | Supernova (#8), Dogtanian and the Three Muskehounds (#9) | |
| 27 | 4 July 2021 | Fast & Furious 9 | £2,861,393 | Freaky (#6), Another Round (#9) | |
| 28 | 11 July 2021 | Black Widow | £6,889,187 | | |
| 29 | 18 July 2021 | Black Widow | £1,801,017 | Space Jam: A New Legacy (#2), The Forever Purge (#3), The Croods: A New Age (#4), Escape Room: Tournament of Champions (#6), Summer of Soul (#10) | |
| 30 | 25 July 2021 | Black Widow | £1,410,288 | Old (#4), Off the Rails (#10) | |
| 31 | 1 August 2021 | The Suicide Squad | £3,252,028 | Jungle Cruise (#2), Spirit Untamed (#6) | |
| 32 | 8 August 2021 | The Suicide Squad | £2,267,135 | Stillwater (#7), The Last Letter from Your Lover (#9) | |
| 33 | 15 August 2021 | Free Guy | £2,477,891 | PAW Patrol: The Movie (#2), Don't Breathe 2 (#7), The Courier (#8) | |
| 34 | 22 August 2021 | Free Guy | £2,267,660 | People Just Do Nothing: Big in Japan (#3), Snake Eyes (#6), The Night House (#9) | |
| 35 | 29 August 2021 | Free Guy | £1,607,761 | Candyman (#2), Andre Rieu’s 2021 Summer Concert: Together Again (#4) | |
| 36 | 5 September 2021 | Shang-Chi and the Legend of the Ten Rings | £5,759,504 | Rise of the Footsoldier: Origins (#10) | |
| 37 | 12 September 2021 | Shang-Chi and the Legend of the Ten Rings | £3,583,848 | Respect (#3), Malignant (#5), Copshop (#7) | |
| 38 | 19 September 2021 | Shang-Chi and the Legend of the Ten Rings | £2,362,692 | Small World (#10) | |
| 39 | 26 September 2021 | Shang-Chi and the Legend of the Ten Rings | £1,558,002 | The Many Saints of Newark (#2), Oasis Knebworth 1996 (#4), The Green Knight (#8) | |
| 40 | 3 October 2021 | No Time to Die † | £25,916,476 | Chal Mera Putt 3 (#6) | |
| 41 | 10 October 2021 | No Time to Die † | £15,235,947 | The Addams Family 2 (#2), Deadly Cuts (#9) | |
| 42 | 17 October 2021 | No Time to Die † | £8,404,165 | Venom: Let There Be Carnage (#2), Halloween Kills (#3), Ron's Gone Wrong (#5), The Last Duel (#6), Honsla Rakh (#8), Arracht (#10) | |
| 43 | 24 October 2021 | Dune | £5,876,892 | The Boss Baby: Family Business (#4), The French Dispatch (#6), Dear Evan Hansen (#9) | |
| 44 | 31 October 2021 | No Time to Die † | £3,514,308 | Hary Potter and the Philosopher's Stone (#6), Last Night in Soho (#8) | |
| 45 | 7 November 2021 | Eternals | £5,456,577 | Spencer (#6) | |
| 46 | 14 November 2021 | Eternals | £2,918,586 | | |
| 47 | 21 November 2021 | Ghostbusters: Afterlife | £4,314,263 | King Richard (#5) | |
| 48 | 28 November 2021 | House of Gucci | £2,425,628 | Encanto (#3), Anything Goes - The Musical (#7) | |
| 49 | 5 December 2021 | House of Gucci | £1,511,982 | Christmas with Andre (#4), Boxing Day (#7), Resident Evil: Welcome to Raccoon City (#8), Dziewczyny Z Dubaju (#10) | |
| 50 | 12 December 2021 | West Side Story | £1,297,786 | Clifford the Big Red Dog (#2), Home Alone (#7), Elf (#9), A Boy Called Christmas (#10) | |
| 51 | 19 December 2021 | Spider-Man: No Way Home | £31,899,232 | Pushpa: The Rise - Part 1 (#7), The Nutcracker - Bolshoi Ballet 2021 (#10) | |
| 52 | 26 December 2021 | Spider-Man: No Way Home | £4,619,518 | The Matrix Resurrections (#2), 83 (#5) | |

== Highest-grossing films ==
=== In-Year Release ===
Highest-grossing films of 2021 by In-year release
| Rank | Title | Distributor | U.K. gross (£m) |
|---|---|---|---|
| 1. | No Time to Die | Universal | £97.9 |
| 2. | Spider-Man: No Way Home | Sony | £96.9 |
| 3. | Dune | Warner Bros. | £21.9 |
| 4. | Shang-Chi and the Legend of the Ten Rings | Disney | £21.9 |
| 5. | Peter Rabbit 2 | Sony | £20.5 |
| 6. | Black Widow | Disney | £18.8 |
| 7. | Venom: Let There Be Carnage | Sony | £18.0 |
| 8. | Free Guy | Disney | £16.9 |
| 9. | Fast and Furious 9 | Universal | £16.5 |
| 10. | Eternals | Disney | £14.9 |

Highest-grossing films by BBFC rating of 2021
| U | Peter Rabbit 2 |
| PG | The Addams Family 2 |
| 12A | No Time to Die |
| 15 | Venom: Let There Be Carnage |
| 18 | Halloween Kills |

== Notes ==
| Preceded by 2020 | 2021 | Succeeded by 2022 |
