= Time Hoppers: The Silk Road =

2025 Canadian animated science fantasy family film

- Directed by: Flordeliza Dayrit
- Written by: Flordeliza Dayrit; Sakina Fakhri
- Produced by: Michael Milo
- Starring: Emily Gin; Angel Haven Rey; Tareek Talati; Jayce McKenzie; Aliyah Harris; Omar Regan; Morris Seng
- Production company: Milo Productions
- Distributed by: V.P. Films
- Release date: 2025
- Running time: 80 minutes
- Country: Canada
- Language: English

Time Hoppers: The Silk Road is a 2025 Canadian animated science fantasy family film, directed by Flordeliza Dayrit and written by Dayrit and Sakina Fakhri. Produced by Milo Productions, the film stars the voices of Emily Gin, Angel Haven Rey, Tareek Talati, Jayce McKenzie, Aliyah Harris, Omar Regan and Morris Seng.

Adapted from the Time Hoppers franchise developed by Muslim Kids TV, the film follows four children who travel through time in an effort to stop an alchemist from erasing the foundations of science.

== Plot ==
In the year 2050, four gifted children from Vancouver's Aqli Academy accidentally gain access to time travel and are sent into the past. Along the Silk Road, they encounter an alchemist named Fasid, who seeks to destroy the work of scientists whose discoveries shaped the modern world. The children pursue him across different historical settings in order to protect figures associated with the Islamic Golden Age and preserve the future of science and technology.

== Cast ==
The principal voice cast includes the following:

- Emily Gin as Abdullah
- Angel Haven Rey as Aysha
- Tareek Talati as Khalid
- Jayce McKenzie as Layla
- Aliyah Harris as Hafsa
- Omar Regan as Habib
- Morris Seng as Fasid

== Production ==
The Time Hoppers project originated as an e-book begun by Dayrit in 2017, inspired by the history of the Silk Road and the Islamic Golden Age. Dayrit and producer Michael Milo later expanded the property into a broader franchise, including a web series and a mobile game released in 2024. The positive response to the game led the filmmakers to pivot from a planned television series to a feature film by late 2024, reusing assets created for the wider franchise. Milo Productions financed the film with its own funds as well as private investment.

Dayrit said the film was created in part to allow Muslim children to see themselves as heroes on screen and to foreground the contributions of Muslim innovators who are rarely highlighted in mainstream family entertainment.

== Release ==
The film premiered in the Middle East on 30 October 2025, including an Arabic-language version screened in Saudi Arabia. It later received a limited North American theatrical release on 7 and 8 February 2026, with Fathom Entertainment booking the film into hundreds of theatres in the United States and Landmark Cinemas showing it in Canada.

It as the first Muslim-made animated feature to receive a nationwide theatrical release in the United States.

The film opened in UK cinemas on 17 April 2026. On 18 March 2026, Vision Films announced that the film would receive a US transactional video-on-demand release on 31 March 2026.

== Reception ==
The film sold over 35,000 tickets in pre-sales, and went on to gross $1.18 million worldwide.

Critical response was mixed. The Guardian's Catherine Bray gave the film 2/5 stars, praising the film's educational material and historical setting, but criticising its animation and dialogue. Monique Jones, for Common Sense Media, gave the film 4/5 stars, praising its education value and the diversity of its characters, while noting some viewer's may find the film's pacing too slow.
