= Ben Rayner =

Canadian music critic

Ben Rayner is a Canadian music critic, a writer for the Toronto Star since 1998. His commentary on artists is extensively cited across the industry. Indie88 considers him "of the most respected industry professionals around."

In 2012, he served on the jury for the Polaris Music Prize.
