= List of 2007 box office number-one films in the United Kingdom =

This is a list of films which have placed number one at the weekend box office in the United Kingdom during 2007.

== Films ==
†	This implies the highest-grossing movie of the year.

#	Weekend End Date	Film	Total Weekend Gross	Reference(s)
1	7 January 2007	Night at the Museum (Note: Opened in 2006)	£2,958,093	
2	14 January 2007	The Pursuit of Happyness	£2,527,181	
3	21 January 2007	Rocky Balboa	£3,639,339	
4	28 January 2007	Rocky Balboa	£1,705,180	
5	4 February 2007	Dreamgirls	£1,329,817	
6	11 February 2007	Music and Lyrics	£1,929,058	
7	18 February 2007	Hot Fuzz	£5,918,149	
8	25 February 2007	Hot Fuzz	£3,297,539	
9	4 March 2007	Hot Fuzz	£2,219,655	
10	11 March 2007	Norbit	£1,962,913	
11	18 March 2007	Norbit	£1,069,030	
12	25 March 2007	300	£4,746,071	
13	1 April 2007	Mr. Bean's Holiday	£6,440,093	
14	8 April 2007	Mr. Bean's Holiday	£2,451,283	
15	15 April 2007	Wild Hogs	£1,691,797	
16	22 April 2007	Wild Hogs	£954,553	
17	29 April 2007	Next	£795,012	
18	6 May 2007	Spider-Man 3	£11,827,013	
19	13 May 2007	Spider-Man 3	£5,596,612	
20	20 May 2007	Spider-Man 3	£2,549,712	
21	27 May 2007	Pirates of the Caribbean: At World's End	£13,412,294	
22	3 June 2007	Pirates of the Caribbean: At World's End	£5,381,920	
23	10 June 2007	Ocean's Thirteen	£3,021,302	
24	17 June 2007	Fantastic Four: Rise of the Silver Surfer	£4,137,169	
25	24 June 2007	Fantastic Four: Rise of the Silver Surfer	£2,254,179	
26	1 July 2007	Shrek the Third	£16,671,727	
27	8 July 2007	Shrek the Third	£5,084,641	
28	15 July 2007	Harry Potter and the Order of the Phoenix †	£16,493,305	
29	22 July 2007	Harry Potter and the Order of the Phoenix †	£6,639,973	
30	29 July 2007	The Simpsons Movie	£13,626,853	
31	5 August 2007	The Simpsons Movie	£4,027,220	
32	12 August 2007	Rush Hour 3	£2,731,998	
33	19 August 2007	The Bourne Ultimatum	£6,553,704	
34	26 August 2007	The Bourne Ultimatum	£2,864,804	
35	2 September 2007	The Bourne Ultimatum	£2,232,971	
36	9 September 2007	Run Fatboy Run	£2,010,250	
37	16 September 2007	Run Fatboy Run	£1,543,836	
38	23 September 2007	Run Fatboy Run	£1,206,177	
39	30 September 2007	Run Fatboy Run	£988,788	
40	7 October 2007	The Heartbreak Kid	£1,236,288	
41	14 October 2007	Ratatouille	£4,444,384	
42	21 October 2007	Ratatouille	£3,056,938	
43	28 October 2007	Ratatouille	£3,589,762	
44	4 November 2007	Ratatouille	£1,551,332	
45	11 November 2007	Good Luck Chuck	£1,316,325	
46	18 November 2007	American Gangster	£2,564,853	
47	25 November 2007	American Gangster	£1,817,691	
48	2 December 2007	Fred Claus	£1,937,042	
49	9 December 2007	The Golden Compass	£7,243,984	
50	16 December 2007	The Golden Compass	£3,002,951	
51	23 December 2007	Enchanted	£2,294,576	
52	30 December 2007	I Am Legend	£11,009,365	

== See also ==
- British films of 2007
- List of number-one DVDs of 2007 (UK)

Preceded by 2006	2007	Succeeded by 2008
