= List of 2008 box office number-one films in the United Kingdom =

This is a list of films which have placed number one at the weekend box office in the United Kingdom during 2008.

== Number-one films ==
†	This implies the highest-grossing movie of the year.

#	Weekend End Date	Film	Total Weekend Gross	Reference(s)
1	6 January 2008	I Am Legend (Note: Opened in 2007)	£3,740,369	
2	13 January 2008	I Am Legend	£2,051,372	
3	20 January 2008	Aliens vs. Predator: Requiem	£1,970,363	
4	27 January 2008	Sweeney Todd: The Demon Barber of Fleet Street	£4,525,246	
5	3 February 2008	Cloverfield	£3,485,956	
6	10 February 2008	National Treasure: Book of Secrets	£2,483,297	
7	17 February 2008	Jumper	£3,068,803	
8	24 February 2008	Jumper	£1,513,088	
9	2 March 2008	The Bank Job	£951,013	
10	9 March 2008	Vantage Point	£1,454,636	
11	16 March 2008	10,000 BC	£1,932,539	
12	23 March 2008	Horton Hears a Who!	£2,947,089	
13	30 March 2008	27 Dresses	£1,752,897	
14	6 April 2008	27 Dresses	£1,028,661	
15	13 April 2008	21	£1,649,855	
16	20 April 2008	21	£1,010,923	
17	27 April 2008	Forgetting Sarah Marshall	£2,144,038	
18	4 May 2008	Iron Man	£5,465,103	
19	11 May 2008	Iron Man	£1,976,721	
20	18 May 2008	Iron Man	£1,917,925	
21	25 May 2008	Indiana Jones and the Kingdom of the Crystal Skull	£12,227,799	
22	1 June 2008	Sex and the City	£8,767,265	
23	8 June 2008	Sex and the City	£3,085,231	
24	15 June 2008	The Incredible Hulk	£3,253,723	
25	22 June 2008	The Incredible Hulk	£1,870,800	
26	29 June 2008	The Chronicles of Narnia: Prince Caspian	£4,060,532	
27	6 July 2008	Hancock	£9,589,095	
28	13 July 2008	Mamma Mia! The Movie †	£6,594,058	
29	20 July 2008	Mamma Mia! The Movie †	£4,561,109	
30	27 July 2008	The Dark Knight	£11,191,824	
31	3 August 2008	The Dark Knight	£6,737,306	
32	10 August 2008	The Mummy: Tomb of the Dragon Emperor	£4,434,650	
33	17 August 2008	The Dark Knight	£2,302,866	
34	24 August 2008	Hellboy II: The Golden Army	£2,969,602	
35	31 August 2008	Step Brothers	£1,681,492	
36	7 September 2008	RocknRolla	£1,565,438	
37	14 September 2008	Pineapple Express	£1,372,911	
38	21 September 2008	Tropic Thunder	£2,483,271	
39	28 September 2008	Tropic Thunder	£1,345,392	
40	5 October 2008	How to Lose Friends & Alienate People	£1,154,607	
41	12 October 2008	The House Bunny	£894,188	
42	19 October 2008	Burn After Reading	£2,045,565	
43	26 October 2008	High School Musical 3: Senior Year	£8,409,375	
44	2 November 2008	Quantum of Solace	£15,384,217	
45	9 November 2008	Quantum of Solace	£9,221,744	
46	16 November 2008	Quantum of Solace	£5,164,182	
47	23 November 2008	Quantum of Solace	£2,884,789	
48	30 November 2008	Four Christmases	£2,275,585	
49	7 December 2008	Madagascar: Escape 2 Africa	£6,342,997	
50	14 December 2008	The Day the Earth Stood Still	£2,752,132	
51	21 December 2008	Twilight	£2,508,422	
52	28 December 2008	Yes Man	£2,331,490	

== See also ==
- British films of 2008
- List of number-one DVDs of 2008 (UK)

Preceded by 2007	2008	Succeeded by 2009
