= List of number-one DVDs of 2009 (UK) =

The following is a list of number-one DVDs of 2009 in the United Kingdom.The highest selling home video formats in the UK are ranked by the Official UK Video/DVD Chart, which is published and compiled by The Official Charts Company, on behalf of the British Video Association. The chart ranks the weekly sales of video and DVD formats in 6,200 retailers across the UK.

== Chart history ==
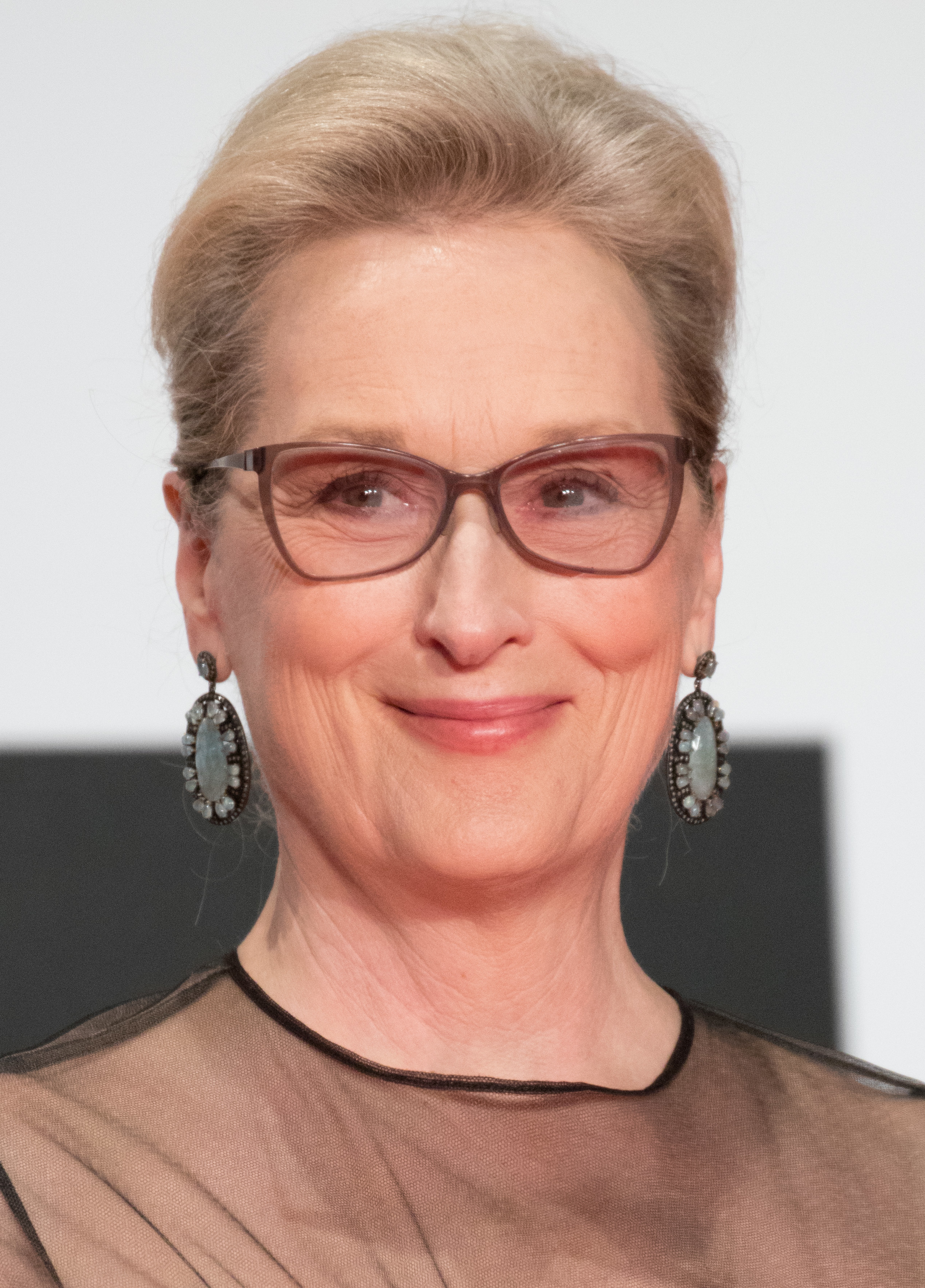
Meryl Streep played the role of Donna Sheridan in the 2008 film, Mamma Mia!. The film went on to become the highest-grossing picture of all time in the United Kingdom, as well as topping the UK Video Chart for four non-consecutive weeks between 2008 and 2009.

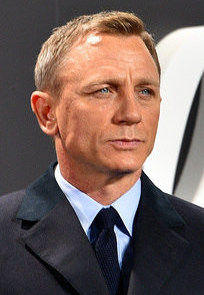
Daniel Craig played the world-famous role of James Bond, in the 2008 installment of the series, Quantum of Solace; the film spent two weeks as the number-one video.

Issue date	Number-one DVD	Company/Distributor	Reference
4 January	The Dark Knight	Warner Home Video	
11 January	Mamma Mia!	Universal Pictures	
18 January	Pineapple Express	Sony Pictures Home Entertainment	
25 January	You Don't Mess with the Zohan	Sony Pictures Home Entertainment	
1 February	Tropic Thunder	DreamWorks	
8 February	RocknRolla	Warner Home Video	
15 February	Taken	20th Century Fox Home Entertainment	
22 February	High School Musical 3: Senior Year	Walt Disney Studios Home Entertainment	
1 March	High School Musical 3: Senior Year	Walt Disney Studios Home Entertainment	
8 March	Ghost Town	DreamWorks	
15 March	Saw V	Lionsgate Home Entertainment	
22 March	The Duchess	Pathé	
29 March	Quantum of Solace	MGM Home Entertainment	
5 April	Quantum of Solace	MGM Home Entertainment	
12 April	Madagascar: Escape 2 Africa	DreamWorks	
19 April	Madagascar: Escape 2 Africa	DreamWorks	
26 April	The Day the Earth Stood Still	20th Century Fox Home Entertainment	
3 May	Australia	20th Century Fox Home Entertainment	
10 May	Australia	20th Century Fox Home Entertainment	
17 May	Role Models	Universal Pictures	
24 May	Underworld: Rise of the Lycans	EIV	
31 May	Seven Pounds	Sony Pictures Home Entertainment	
7 June	Slumdog Millionaire	Pathé	
14 June	The Curious Case of Benjamin Button	Paramount Home Entertainment	
21 June	Bolt	Walt Disney Home Entertainment	
28 June	Bolt	Walt Disney Home Entertainment	
5 July	Gran Torino	Warner Home Video	
12 July	Marley & Me	20th Century Fox Home Entertainment	
19 July	The Young Victoria	Momentum Pictures	
26 July	The Haunting in Connecticut	EIV	
2 August	Watchmen	Paramount Home Entertainment	
9 August	Knowing	E1 Entertainment	
16 August	17 Again	EIV	
23 August	17 Again	EIV	
30 August	Slumdog Millionaire	Pathé	
6 September	Slumdog Millionaire	Pathé	
13 September	Hannah Montana: The Movie	Walt Disney Studios Home Entertainment	
20 September	Angels & Demons	Sony Pictures Home Entertainment	
27 September	Fast & Furious	Universal Pictures	
4 October	Fast & Furious	Universal Pictures	
11 October	Twilight	E1 Entertainment	
18 October	Coraline	Universal Pictures	
25 October	X-Men Origins: Wolverine	20th Century Fox Home Entertainment	
1 November	Monsters vs. Aliens	DreamWorks	
8 November	Family Guy series 8	20th Century Fox Home Entertainment	
15 November	Night at the Museum 2	20th Century Fox Home Entertainment	
22 November	Star Trek	Paramount Home Entertainment	
29 November	Ice Age 3 - Dawn of the Dinosaurs	20th Century Fox Home Entertainment	
6 December	Transformers - Revenge of the Fallen	Paramount Home Entertainment	
13 December	Harry Potter and the Half-Blood Prince	Warner Home Video	
20 December	Harry Potter and the Half-Blood Prince	Warner Home Video	
27 December	Michael McIntyre – Hello Wembley	Universal Pictures	

== See also ==
- British films of 2009
- List of 2009 box office number-one films in the United Kingdom
- UK DVD Chart
