= List of 2011 box office number-one films in the United Kingdom =

This is a list of films which have placed number one at the weekend box office in the United Kingdom during 2011.

== Films ==
†	This implies the highest-grossing movie of the year.

Week	Weekend End Date	Film	Total weekend gross (Pound sterling)	Weekend openings in the Top 10	Reference(s)
1	2 January 2011	Gulliver's Travels	£7,028,747	Love & Other Drugs (#3), The Way Back (#4)	
2	9 January 2011	The King's Speech	£3,523,102	127 Hours (#2), The Next Three Days (#5), Season of the Witch (#10)	
3	16 January 2011	The King's Speech	£4,401,926	The Green Hornet (#2)	
4	23 January 2011	The King's Speech	£4,226,074	Black Swan (#2), The Dilemma (#4), Morning Glory (#8), NEDS (#10)	
5	30 January 2011	Tangled	£5,106,612	The Mechanic (#4), Hereafter (#7), How Do You Know (#10)	
6	6 February 2011	Tangled	£4,569,135	The Fighter (#3), Sanctum (#5), A Little Bit of Heaven (#7), Brighton Rock (#9)	
7	13 February 2011	Gnomeo and Juliet	£2,945,627	True Grit (#4), Yogi Bear (#5), Just Go with It (#6), Never Let Me Go (#9)	
8	20 February 2011	Paul	£5,517,121	Big Mommas: Like Father Like Son (#5), Justin Bieber: Never Say Never (#9)	
9	27 February 2011	Gnomeo and Juliet	£2,502,806	I Am Number Four (#3), No Strings Attached (#9), West is West (#10),	
10	6 March 2011	Rango	£1,638,613	The Adjustment Bureau (#2), Unknown (#3)	
11	13 March 2011	Battle: Los Angeles	£1,792,913	Hall Pass (#5), Fair Game (#9)	
12	20 March 2011	Rango	£1,045,326	Chalet Girl (#4), The Lincoln Lawyer (#5), Anuvahood (#7)	
13	27 March 2011	Limitless	£2,087,363	A Turtle's Tale: Sammy's Adventures (#2), The Eagle (#3)	
14	3 April 2011	Hop	£1,394,675	Source Code (#2), Sucker Punch (#4)	
15	10 April 2011	Rio	£1,513,211	Thank You (#7), The Roommate (#9), Mars Needs Mums (#10)	
16	17 April 2011	Scream 4	£2,055,709	Your Highness (#3), Red Riding Hood (#4), Winnie the Pooh (#8), Little White Lies (#10)	
17	24 April 2011	Fast Five	£5,332,096	Arthur (#3), Beastly (#5), TT3D: Closer to the Edge (#9)	
18	1 May 2011	Thor	£5,449,300	Insidious (#3)	
19	8 May 2011	Thor	£1,946,695	Water for Elephants (#4), Hanna (#5), Something Borrowed (#6)	
20	15 May 2011	Thor	£1,360,418	Attack the Block (#3)	
21	22 May 2011	Pirates of the Caribbean: On Stranger Tides	£11,634,860	Blitz (#9), Win Win (#10)	
22	29 May 2011	The Hangover Part II	£10,409,017	Diary of a Wimpy Kid: Rodrick Rules (#3)	
23	5 June 2011	X-Men: First Class	£5,438,386	JLS: Eyes Wide Open (#5), Senna (#6)	
24	12 June 2011	Kung Fu Panda 2	£6,188,897	Honey 2 (#5), Mother's Day (#9)	
25	19 June 2011	Green Lantern	£2,472,969	Bad Teacher (#3), Potiche (#9)	
26	26 June 2011	Bridesmaids	£3,445,395	Double Dhamaal (#10)	
27	3 July 2011	Transformers: Dark of the Moon	£10,728,503	Larry Crowne (#5), Delhi Belly (#9)	
28	10 July 2011	Transformers: Dark of the Moon	£4,750,519	The Guard (#5), The Tree of Life (#6)	
29	17 July 2011	Harry Potter and the Deathly Hallows – Part 2 †	£23,753,171	Zindagi Na Milegi Dobara (#7)	
30	24 July 2011	Harry Potter and the Deathly Hallows – Part 2 †	£8,523,417	Cars 2 (#2), Horrible Bosses (#3), Beginners (#8)	
31	31 July 2011	Harry Potter and the Deathly Hallows – Part 2 †	£4,567,581	Captain America: The First Avenger (#2), Horrid Henry: The Movie (#5), Zookeeper (#6)	
32	7 August 2011	Harry Potter and the Deathly Hallows – Part 2 †	£2,810,888	Super 8 (#2), Mr. Popper's Penguins (#3)	
33	14 August 2011	Rise of the Planet of the Apes	£5,835,140	The Smurfs (#2)	
34	21 August 2011	The Inbetweeners Movie	£13,216,736	Cowboys & Aliens (#3), Spy Kids: All the Time in the World (#6), Glee: The 3D Concert Movie (#9)	
35	28 August 2011	The Inbetweeners Movie	£5,696,848	One Day (#2), Final Destination 5 (#5), Conan the Barbarian (#8)	
36	4 September 2011	The Inbetweeners Movie	£3,679,555	Bodyguard (#5), Fright Night (#7), Apollo 18 (#8)	
37	11 September 2011	The Inbetweeners Movie	£2,147,393	Friends with Benefits (#2), Jane Eyre (#3), Colombiana (#7)	
38	18 September 2011	Tinker Tailor Soldier Spy	£2,814,860	The Change-Up (#5), I Don't Know How She Does It (#7), 30 Minutes or Less (#10)	
39	25 September 2011	Tinker Tailor Soldier Spy	£2,104,762	Crazy, Stupid, Love (#2), Warrior (#3), Drive (#5), Killer Elite (#7)	
40	2 October 2011	Tinker Tailor Soldier Spy	£1,064,901	Abduction (#2), The Phantom of the Opera: 25th Anniversary Concert (#3), The Debt (#5), Shark Night (#6), What's Your Number? (#9)	
41	9 October 2011	Johnny English Reborn	£4,965,000	The Lion King 3D (#2), Don't Be Afraid of the Dark (#5), Midnight in Paris (#6)	
42	16 October 2011	Johnny English Reborn	£3,072,542	The Three Musketeers (#3), Real Steel (#4), Footloose (#6), Dolphin Tale (#7)	
43	23 October 2011	Paranormal Activity 3	£3,405,036	Contagion (#3), We Need to Talk About Kevin (#7)	
44	30 October 2011	The Adventures of Tintin: The Secret of the Unicorn	£6,758,724	Ra.One (#6), The Help (#7), The Ides of March (#8)	
45	6 November 2011	The Adventures of Tintin: The Secret of the Unicorn	£2,199,171	In Time (#2), Tower Heist (#3), Machine Gun Preacher (#10)	
46	13 November 2011	Immortals	£2,166,432	Arthur Christmas (#2), The Rum Diary (#6)	
47	20 November 2011	The Twilight Saga: Breaking Dawn – Part 1	£13,910,877	Justice (#7)	
48	27 November 2011	The Twilight Saga: Breaking Dawn – Part 1	£4,574,978	My Week with Marilyn (#3), 50/50 (#6), Dream House (#7), Desi Boyz (#9), Moneyball (#10)	
49	4 December 2011	Arthur Christmas	£1,896,595	Happy Feet Two (#2), Hugo (#4), The Thing (#5)	
50	11 December 2011	Puss in Boots	£1,975,758	New Year's Eve (#3), A Very Harold and Kumar Christmas (#8), Another Earth (#10)	
51	18 December 2011	Sherlock Holmes: A Game of Shadows	£3,827,697	Alvin and the Chipmunks: Chipwrecked (#2)	
52	25 December 2011	Arthur Christmas	£2,000,000	Don 2 (#6), It's a Wonderful Life (#10)	

Preceded by 2010	2011	Succeeded by 2012
