= List of British films of 2007 =

A list of British films released in 2007.

== 2007 ==
Title	Director	Cast	Genre	Notes
28 Weeks Later	Juan Carlos Fresnadillo	Robert Carlyle, Rose Byrne, Jeremy Renner, Idris Elba	Horror	
And When Did You Last See Your Father?	Anand Tucker	Jim Broadbent, Colin Firth	Drama	
Angel	François Ozon	Sam Neill	Drama	
Atonement	Joe Wright	James McAvoy, Keira Knightley	Drama	Winner of the Golden Globe and BAFTA for Best Film; nominated for seven Academy Awards, including Best Picture
The Baker	Gareth Lewis	Damian Lewis, Kate Ashfield	Comedy	
Becoming Jane	Julian Jarrold	Anne Hathaway, James McAvoy	Biopic	
Before the Rains	Santosh Sivan	Linus Roache, Rahul Bose	Romance	
Boy A	John Crowley	Andrew Garfield	Drama	2008 Best Actor BAFTA TV Award
Brick Lane	Sarah Gavron	Tannishtha Chatterjee	Drama	
Broken Thread	Mahesh Mathai	Linus Roache, Saffron Burrows	Thriller	
Cassandra's Dream	Woody Allen	Colin Farrell, Ewan McGregor	Drama	
Control	Anton Corbijn	Sam Riley, Samantha Morton	Biopic	
Dangerous Parking	Peter Howitt	Saffron Burrows, Sean Pertwee	Drama	
Death at a Funeral	Frank Oz	Ewen Bremner, Peter Dinklage	Comedy	
Death Defying Acts	Gillian Armstrong	Catherine Zeta-Jones, Guy Pearce	Historical	
Eastern Promises	David Cronenberg	Viggo Mortensen, Naomi Watts, Vincent Cassel	Drama	
Elizabeth: The Golden Age	Shekhar Kapur	Cate Blanchett, Clive Owen, Geoffrey Rush	Historical drama	Winner of the Academy Award for Best Costume Design
Fantacide	Shane Mather	Peter Rands, Paul Stone, Ivan Brady	Horror	
Far North	Asif Kapadia	Michelle Yeoh, Sean Bean, Michelle Krusiec	Drama	
Flawless	Michael Radford	Demi Moore, Michael Caine	Crime	
Flood	Tony Mitchell	Robert Carlyle, Jessalyn Gilsig	Thriller	
Four Last Songs	Francesca Joseph	Stanley Tucci, Rhys Ifans	Comedy/drama	
The Golden Compass	Chris Weitz	Dakota Blue Richards, Nicole Kidman	Fantasy	Winner of the Academy Award for Best Visual Effects
The Good Night	Jake Paltrow	Martin Freeman, Gwyneth Paltrow	Romance/comedy	
Goodbye Bafana	Bille August	Joseph Fiennes, Dennis Haysbert	Biopic	
Grow Your Own	Richard Laxton	Benedict Wong, Eddie Marsan	Comedy drama	
Hallam Foe	David Mackenzie	Jamie Bell, Sophia Myles	Drama	
Hannibal Rising	Peter Webber	Gaspard Ulliel, Gong Li, Rhys Ifans, Dominic West	Thriller/Drama	Co-produced with Italy, France, Czech Republic, and United States
Harry Potter and the Order of the Phoenix	David Yates	Daniel Radcliffe, Rupert Grint, Emma Watson	Fantasy	
The Heart of the Earth	Antonio Cuadri	Catalina Sandino Moreno, Sienna Guillory	Drama	Co-production with Spain
Hot Fuzz	Edgar Wright	Simon Pegg, Nick Frost, Jim Broadbent	Comedy	
I Want Candy	Stephen Surjik	Tom Riley, Tom Burke	Comedy	
Infinite Justice	Jamil Dehlavi	Kevin Collins, Raza Jaffrey	Thriller	
Irina Palm	Sam Garbarski	Marianne Faithfull, Miki Manojlovic	Drama	
Joe Strummer: The Future Is Unwritten	Julien Temple		Documentary	
The Kite Runner	Marc Forster	Khalid Abdalla, Homayoun Ershadi, Shaun Toub, Atossa Leoni, Saïd Taghmaoui	Drama	
Lady Godiva: Back in the Saddle	Baz Taylor	James Fleet, Caroline Harker	Comedy	
The Magic Door	Paul Matthews	Jenny Agutter, Mick Walter, Patsy Kensit, Anthony Head	Fantasy	
Magicians	Andrew O'Connor	David Mitchell, Robert Webb	Comedy	
The Moon and the Stars	John Irvin	Jonathan Pryce, Alfred Molina	Drama	Co-production with Hungary and Italy
Mr. Bean's Holiday	Steve Bendelack	Rowan Atkinson, Max Baldry, Emma de Caunes	Comedy	
Marigold	Willard Carroll	Salman Khan, Ali Larter, Nandana Sen	Romance	
Mrs Ratcliffe's Revolution	Bille Eltringham	Iain Glen, Catherine Tate	Comedy/drama	
Outlaw	Nick Love	Sean Bean, Danny Dyer	Crime/drama	
Outpost	Steve Barker	Ray Stevenson, Julian Wadham	Horror	
Popcorn	Darren Fisher	Jack Ryder, Jodi Albert	Comedy	
The Riddle	Brendan Foley	Derek Jacobi, Vinnie Jones, Vanessa Redgrave	Thriller	
Run Fatboy Run	David Schwimmer		Comedy	
St Trinian's	Oliver Parker, Barnaby Thompson	Rupert Everett, Colin Firth, Russell Brand	Comedy	
Shoot on Sight	Jag Mundhra	Naseeruddin Shah, Greta Scacchi	Thriller	
Sleuth	Kenneth Branagh	Michael Caine, Jude Law	Drama	
Stardust	Matthew Vaughn	Claire Danes, Charlie Cox, Ricky Gervais	Fantasy	
Straightheads	Dan Reed	Gillian Anderson, Danny Dyer	Thriller	
Sunshine	Danny Boyle	Cillian Murphy, Cliff Curtis, Rose Byrne, Chris Evans	Sci-fi/horror	
Sweeney Todd: The Demon Barber of Fleet Street	Tim Burton	Johnny Depp, Helena Bonham Carter, Alan Rickman	Horror/musical	
Taking Liberties	Chris Atkins		Documentary	
Things We Lost in the Fire	Susanne Bier	Halle Berry, Benicio del Toro, David Duchovny, Alison Lohman, Omar Benson Miller, John Carroll Lynch	Drama	
This Is England	Shane Meadows	Thomas Turgoose, Stephen Graham, Jo Hartley	Drama	
The Waiting Room	Roger Goldby	Anne-Marie Duff, Frank Finlay	Romance	
The Water Horse: Legend of the Deep	Jay Russell	Emily Watson, David Morrissey	Family	

== See also ==
- 2007 in film
- 2007 in British music
- 2007 in British radio
- 2007 in British television
- 2007 in the United Kingdom
- List of 2007 box office number-one films in the United Kingdom
