= List of 2006 box office number-one films in the United Kingdom =

This is a list of films which have placed number one at the weekend box office in the United Kingdom during 2006.

== Number-one films ==
| † | This implies the highest-grossing movie of the year. |

| # | Weekend End Date | Film | Total Weekend Gross | Reference(s) |
|---|---|---|---|---|
| 1 | 1 January 2006 | The Chronicles of Narnia: The Lion, the Witch and the Wardrobe (Note: Opened in 2005) | £2,994,438 | |
| 2 | 8 January 2006 | King Kong | £2,160,421 | |
| 3 | 15 January 2006 | Jarhead | £1,927,987 | |
| 4 | 22 January 2006 | Fun with Dick and Jane | £1,957,060 | |
| 5 | 29 January 2006 | Fun with Dick and Jane | £1,381,737 | |
| 6 | 5 February 2006 | Zathura: A Space Adventure | £1,317,391 | |
| 7 | 12 February 2006 | Chicken Little | £3,173,867 | |
| 8 | 19 February 2006 | Chicken Little | £2,184,760 | |
| 9 | 26 February 2006 | Date Movie | £1,288,089 | |
| 10 | 5 March 2006 | Date Movie | £1,057,768 | |
| 11 | 12 March 2006 | The Hills Have Eyes | £1,126,575 | |
| 12 | 19 March 2006 | The Pink Panther | £1,944,581 | |
| 13 | 26 March 2006 | Inside Man | £1,806,854 | |
| 14 | 2 April 2006 | Inside Man | £1,117,054 | |
| 15 | 9 April 2006 | Ice Age: The Meltdown | £9,775,974 | |
| 16 | 16 April 2006 | Ice Age: The Meltdown | £3,608,531 | |
| 17 | 23 April 2006 | Ice Age: The Meltdown | £1,886,277 | |
| 18 | 30 April 2006 | Ice Age: The Meltdown | £1,100,736 | |
| 19 | 7 May 2006 | Mission: Impossible III | £5,378,013 | |
| 20 | 14 May 2006 | Mission: Impossible III | £2,751,733 | |
| 21 | 21 May 2006 | The Da Vinci Code | £9,501,444 | |
| 22 | 28 May 2006 | X-Men: The Last Stand | £7,091,820 | |
| 23 | 4 June 2006 | X-Men: The Last Stand | £2,310,683 | |
| 24 | 11 June 2006 | The Omen | £2,096,002 | |
| 25 | 18 June 2006 | The Fast and the Furious: Tokyo Drift | £1,813,359 | |
| 26 | 25 June 2006 | The Fast and the Furious: Tokyo Drift | £1,019,854 | |
| 27 | 2 July 2006 | Over the Hedge | £3,589,038 | |
| 28 | 9 July 2006 | Pirates of the Caribbean: Dead Man's Chest † | £13,740,784 | |
| 29 | 16 July 2006 | Pirates of the Caribbean: Dead Man's Chest † | £6,048,087 | |
| 30 | 23 July 2006 | Pirates of the Caribbean: Dead Man's Chest † | £3,868,216 | |
| 31 | 30 July 2006 | Cars | £2,668,968 | |
| 32 | 6 August 2006 | Miami Vice | £2,231,684 | |
| 33 | 13 August 2006 | Cars | £1,340,219 | |
| 34 | 20 August 2006 | Snakes on a Plane | £1,069,608 | |
| 35 | 27 August 2006 | You, Me and Dupree | £1,636,249 | |
| 36 | 3 September 2006 | You, Me and Dupree | £1,165,610 | |
| 37 | 10 September 2006 | Accepted | £2,234,652 | |
| 38 | 17 September 2006 | Talladega Nights: The Ballad of Ricky Bobby | £1,033,759 | |
| 39 | 24 September 2006 | Children of Men | £1,284,254 | |
| 40 | 1 October 2006 | Click | £1,797,073 | |
| 41 | 8 October 2006 | The Devil Wears Prada | £3,267,580 | |
| 42 | 15 October 2006 | The Departed | £1,957,646 | |
| 43 | 22 October 2006 | The Departed | £1,456,564 | |
| 44 | 29 October 2006 | Saw III | £2,522,521 | |
| 45 | 5 November 2006 | Borat | £6,242,344 | |
| 46 | 12 November 2006 | Borat | £4,510,657 | |
| 47 | 19 November 2006 | Casino Royale | £13,370,969 | |
| 48 | 26 November 2006 | Casino Royale | £8,546,238 | |
| 49 | 3 December 2006 | Casino Royale | £5,307,969 | |
| 50 | 10 December 2006 | Happy Feet | £3,689,166 | |
| 51 | 17 December 2006 | Happy Feet | £2,034,916 | |
| 52 | 24 December 2006 | Happy Feet | £2,048,266 | |
| 53 | 31 December 2006 | Night at the Museum | £7,690,312 | |

== See also ==
- List of British films — British films by year

| Preceded by 2005 | 2006 | Succeeded by 2007 |
