= List of 2005 box office number-one films in the United Kingdom =

This is a list of films which have placed number one at the weekend box office in the United Kingdom during 2005.

== Number-one films ==
†	This implies the highest-grossing movie of the year.

#	Weekend End Date	Film	Total Weekend Gross	Reference(s)
1	2 January 2005	The Incredibles (Note: Opened in 2004)	£1,296,333	
2	9 January 2005	White Noise	£1,787,478	
3	16 January 2005	Closer	£1,568,526	
4	23 January 2005	Closer	£1,587,136	
5	30 January 2005	Meet the Fockers	£7,917,661	
6	6 February 2005	Meet the Fockers	£4,588,360	
7	13 February 2005	Meet the Fockers	£2,957,466	
8	20 February 2005	Meet the Fockers	£1,893,131	
9	27 February 2005	Hide and Seek	£1,594,508	
10	6 March 2005	Boogeyman	£788,439	
11	13 March 2005	Hitch	£4,230,857	
12	20 March 2005	Robots	£2,622,253	
13	27 March 2005	Hitch	£1,660,358	
14	3 April 2005	The Ring Two	£2,062,792	
15	10 April 2005	Sahara	£1,370,577	
16	17 April 2005	The Interpreter	£1,589,829	
17	24 April 2005	The Interpreter	£1,212,734	
18	1 May 2005	The Hitchhiker's Guide to the Galaxy	£3,298,262	
19	8 May 2005	Kingdom of Heaven	£2,530,445	
20	15 May 2005	Kingdom of Heaven	£1,385,529	
21	22 May 2005	Star Wars: Episode III – Revenge of the Sith	£14,361,469	
22	29 May 2005	Star Wars: Episode III – Revenge of the Sith	£5,427,091	
23	5 June 2005	Star Wars: Episode III – Revenge of the Sith	£3,313,328	
24	12 June 2005	Mr. & Mrs. Smith	£3,943,422	
25	19 June 2005	Batman Begins	£4,427,802	
26	26 June 2005	Batman Begins	£2,926,042	
27	3 July 2005	War of the Worlds	£8,644,787	
28	10 July 2005	War of the Worlds	£4,219,120	
29	17 July 2005	Madagascar	£5,431,639	
30	24 July 2005	Fantastic Four	£3,541,391	
31	31 July 2005	Charlie and the Chocolate Factory	£7,972,168	
32	7 August 2005	Charlie and the Chocolate Factory	£4,441,851	
33	14 August 2005	Charlie and the Chocolate Factory	£2,886,352	
34	21 August 2005	Charlie and the Chocolate Factory	£1,691,431	
35	28 August 2005	The Dukes of Hazzard	£1,720,754	
36	4 September 2005	The 40-Year-Old Virgin	£1,757,540	
37	11 September 2005	The Longest Yard	£1,255,334	
38	18 September 2005	Pride & Prejudice	£2,529,947	
39	25 September 2005	Pride & Prejudice	£1,934,083	
40	2 October 2005	Pride & Prejudice	£1,473,062	
41	9 October 2005	Serenity	£958,816	
42	16 October 2005	Wallace & Gromit: The Curse of the Were-Rabbit	£9,374,932	
43	23 October 2005	Wallace & Gromit: The Curse of the Were-Rabbit	£4,666,723	
44	30 October 2005	Wallace & Gromit: The Curse of the Were-Rabbit	£3,593,266	
45	6 November 2005	Nanny McPhee	£1,656,113	
46	13 November 2005	In Her Shoes	£1,337,176	
47	20 November 2005	Harry Potter and the Goblet of Fire †	£14,933,901	
48	27 November 2005	Harry Potter and the Goblet of Fire †	£9,275,599	
49	4 December 2005	Harry Potter and the Goblet of Fire †	£4,829,804	
50	11 December 2005	The Chronicles of Narnia: The Lion, the Witch and the Wardrobe	£8,884,111	
51	18 December 2005	King Kong	£6,944,740	
52	25 December 2005	The Chronicles of Narnia: The Lion, the Witch and the Wardrobe	£2,843,353	

== See also ==
- List of British films — British films by year

Preceded by 2004	2005	Succeeded by 2006
