= Pride & Prejudice (2005 film) =

2005 film by Joe Wright

- UK theatrical release poster
- Directed by: Joe Wright
- Screenplay by: Deborah Moggach
- Based on: Pride and Prejudice; 1813 novel by Jane Austen
- Produced by: Tim Bevan; Eric Fellner; Paul Webster
- Starring: Keira Knightley; Matthew Macfadyen; Brenda Blethyn; Donald Sutherland; Rosamund Pike; Jena Malone; Tom Hollander; Penelope Wilton; Judi Dench
- Cinematography: Roman Osin
- Edited by: Paul Tothill
- Music by: Dario Marianelli
- Production companies: Universal Pictures; StudioCanal; Working Title Films; Scion Films
- Distributed by: Focus Features (United States); Mars Distribution (France); United International Pictures (International)
- Release dates: 11 September 2005 (TIFF); 16 September 2005 (United Kingdom); 23 November 2005 (United States); 18 January 2006 (France)
- Running time: 127 minutes
- Countries: United Kingdom; United States; France
- Language: English
- Budget: $28 million
- Box office: $131.9 million

Pride & Prejudice is a 2005 period romance film directed by Joe Wright, in his feature directorial debut, based on the 1813 novel by Jane Austen. The film features five sisters from an English family of landed gentry as they deal with issues of marriage, morality, and misconceptions. Keira Knightley stars as Elizabeth Bennet, while Matthew Macfadyen plays Mr Darcy, who falls in love with her.

Screenwriter Deborah Moggach initially attempted to make her script as faithful to the novel as possible, writing from Elizabeth's perspective while preserving much of the original dialogue. Wright encouraged greater deviation from the text, including changing the Bennet family dynamics. Wright and Moggach set the film in an earlier period and avoided depicting a "perfectly clean Regency world", presenting instead a "muddy hem version" of the time. It was shot entirely on location in England on an 11-week schedule. Wright found casting difficult due to past performances of particular characters. The filmmakers had to balance who they thought was best for each role with the studio's desire for stars. Knightley was well known in part from her role in the Pirates of the Caribbean film series, while Macfadyen had no international name recognition.

Produced by Working Title Films in association with StudioCanal, Pride & Prejudice was released on 16 September 2005 in the United Kingdom and on 11 November in the United States. The film's themes emphasise realism, romanticism and family. It was marketed to a younger, mainstream audience; promotional items noted that it came from the producers of 2001's romantic comedy Bridget Jones's Diary before acknowledging its provenance as an Austen novel. Austen scholars opined that Wright's work created a new hybrid genre by blending traditional traits of the heritage film with "youth-oriented filmmaking techniques".

Pride & Prejudice was successful at the box office, grossing $131.9 million worldwide on a $28 million budget. It received positive reviews from critics, with praise for Knightley's performance. It received four nominations at the 78th Academy Awards, including Best Actress for the 20-year-old Knightley, making her the third-youngest Best Actress nominee at the time. The film received other accolades, including the BAFTA Award for Outstanding Debut by a British Writer, Director or Producer for Wright.

== Plot ==
During the late 18th century in England, Mr and Mrs Bennet and their daughters—Jane, Elizabeth, Mary, Kitty, and Lydia—live at Longbourn, their rural estate in Hertfordshire. Mrs Bennet, eager to secure suitable marriages for her daughters, is delighted when wealthy bachelor Charles Bingley moves into nearby Netherfield Hall.

At an assembly ball, Bingley, his sister Caroline, and his friend Mr Darcy meet the local society. Bingley and Jane are immediately taken with each other, while Elizabeth instantly dislikes the snobbish Darcy and overhears his dismissive remarks about her.

Later, visiting the Bingleys, Jane falls ill and must stay to recuperate. While Elizabeth is visiting Jane at Netherfield, she verbally spars with the haughty Caroline and the aloof Darcy. Jane recovers and, soon after, Mr Bennet's cousin Mr Collins, a pompous clergyman, visits the Bennets; as the closest male relative, Collins will inherit Longbourn as it is entailed on the male line.

Mr Collins tells Mrs Bennet he intends to propose to Jane, but she says Jane will soon be engaged and suggests Elizabeth, whom Collins considers an agreeable alternative. The Bennet sisters also meet the handsome and charming soldier George Wickham, whose father worked for the Darcy family. He wins Elizabeth's sympathy by telling her that Mr Darcy denied him his rightful inheritance.

At the Netherfield ball, Elizabeth dances with Darcy, though the encounter is strained. The next day, Collins proposes to Elizabeth, who roundly rejects him; despite her mother's anger, her father supports her decision.

Elizabeth is astonished when her close friend, Charlotte, fearing spinsterhood, announces her engagement to Mr Collins. The Bingley party unexpectedly returns to London. Elizabeth urges Jane to visit their aunt and uncle, the Gardiners, who live in London, hoping she reconnects with Bingley.

Months later, Elizabeth visits Charlotte and Mr Collins, who reside next to Lady Catherine de Bourgh's estate in Kent. Elizabeth unexpectedly meets Darcy, who is Lady Catherine's nephew and visiting with his cousin, Colonel Fitzwilliam. Unaware that Jane is Elizabeth's sister, Fitzwilliam mentions that Darcy recently untangled Bingley from an imprudent match with an "unsuitable" family.

Distraught, Elizabeth is then met by Darcy, who to her amazement proposes marriage, declaring his ardent love despite her inferior rank and family. Offended and angry, she refuses him. He defends separating Jane and Bingley, believing Jane indifferent to his friend, and criticises the other Bennets' occasional social impropriety. Elizabeth also cites his mistreating Wickham.

Angry and heartbroken, Darcy delivers Elizabeth a letter describing Wickham's true character: Wickham squandered the bequest Darcy's father left him, then attempted to seduce Darcy's 15-year-old sister, Georgiana, into eloping to gain her fortune.

Elizabeth returns home, as does Jane. Accompanying the Gardiners on a trip to the Peak District, Elizabeth reluctantly tours Pemberley, the grand Darcy estate in Derbyshire. She unexpectedly runs into Darcy, who invites her and the Gardiners to dine there. Darcy's manner has softened considerably, impressing the Gardiners, and Georgiana shares her brother's flattering reports about Elizabeth.

An urgent letter from Jane reveals that Lydia has run off with Wickham. Darcy leaves abruptly, and Elizabeth returns home, certain she will never see Darcy again. Her mother fears Lydia's disgrace will ruin her other daughters' chances of good marriages.

After a tense waiting period, Mr Gardiner sends news that Lydia and Wickham are now married, and the newlyweds return to Longbourn. Lydia lets slip to Elizabeth that it was Darcy who found them and paid for their wedding; he also purchased Wickham's military commission.

Bingley and Darcy return to Netherfield and visit Longbourn. Bingley proposes to Jane, who accepts. Late that night, Lady Catherine arrives to see Elizabeth and demands she never become engaged to Darcy because, she claims, Darcy has been engaged to marry Lady Catherine's daughter, who has suffered poor health since infancy. Deeply insulted, Elizabeth orders her to leave.

Walking early the next morning, Elizabeth encounters Darcy, who apologises for his aunt's intrusion. He professes his continued love and Elizabeth, her feelings radically altered, accepts his proposal. She tells her father the truth of Darcy's actions, and Mr Bennet gives Elizabeth his consent to marry, overjoyed she has found love.

== Cast ==
- Keira Knightley as Elizabeth Bennet
- Matthew Macfadyen as Mr Darcy
- Brenda Blethyn as Mrs Bennet
- Donald Sutherland as Mr Bennet
- Rosamund Pike as Jane Bennet
- Jena Malone as Lydia Bennet
- Tom Hollander as Mr Collins
- Penelope Wilton as Mrs Gardiner
- Judi Dench as Lady Catherine de Bourgh
- Simon Woods as Charles Bingley
- Carey Mulligan as Catherine "Kitty" Bennet
- Talulah Riley as Mary Bennet
- Rupert Friend as George Wickham
- Kelly Reilly as Caroline Bingley
- Tamzin Merchant as Georgiana Darcy
- Claudie Blakley as Charlotte Lucas
- Cornelius Booth as Colonel Fitzwilliam
- Peter Wight as Mr Gardiner
- Roy Holder as Mr Hill
- Pip Torrens as Netherfield Hall Butler
- Meg Wynn Owen as Mrs Reynolds
- Sinead Matthews as Mrs Betsy

== Production ==
=== Conception and adaptation ===
As with several recent Jane Austen adaptations, Pride & Prejudice was an Anglo-American collaboration, between British studio Working Title Films (in association with French company StudioCanal) and its American parent company, Universal Studios. Working Title at the time was known for mainstream productions like Bridget Jones's Diary and Love Actually that drew international audiences, not films in the historical drama genre. Its co-chairman Tim Bevan said the studio wanted to "bring Austen's original story, concentrating on Lizzie, back in all its glory to the big screen for audiences everywhere to enjoy". Given a "relatively inexpensive" budget of £22 million ($28 million), the film was expected to excel at the box office, particularly given the commercial success of Romeo + Juliet (1996) and Shakespeare in Love (1998), as well as the resurgence of interest in Austen.

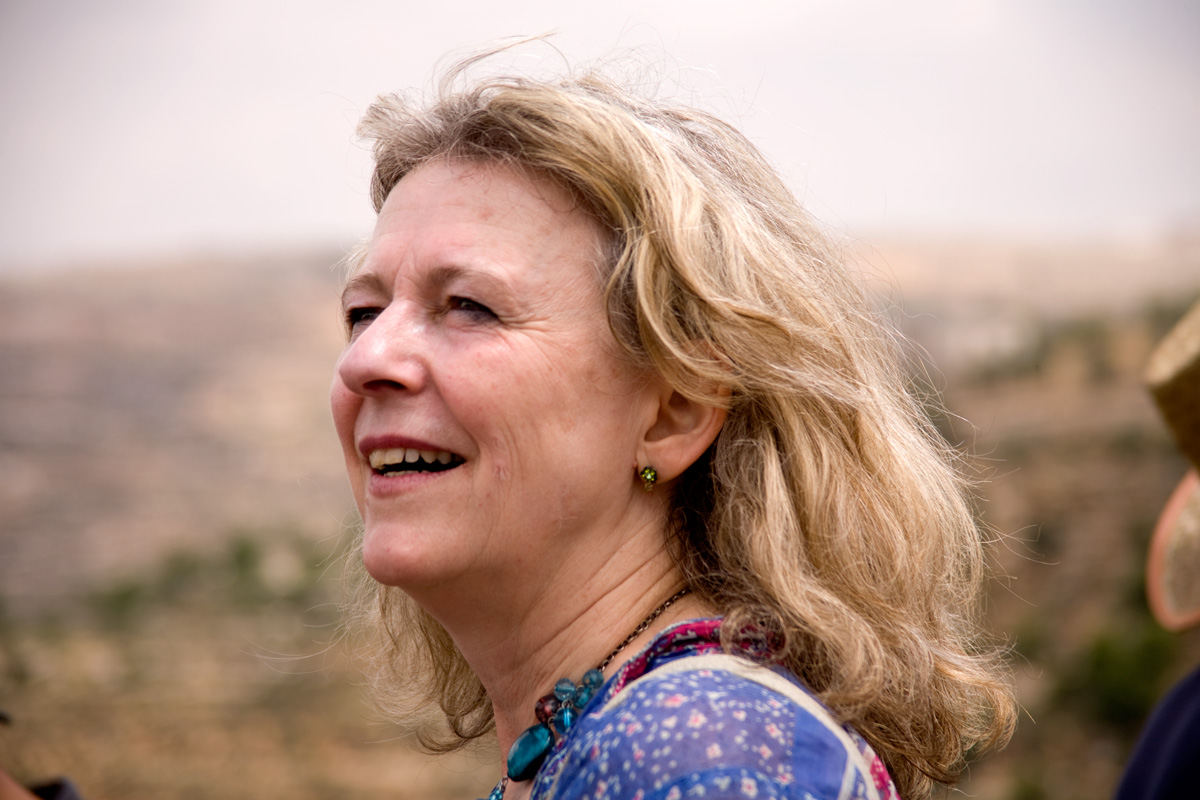
Screenwriter Deborah Moggach changed the film's period setting to the late 18th century partly out of concern that it would be overshadowed by the 1995 BBC adaptation.

Given little instruction from the studio, screenwriter Deborah Moggach spent over two years on the script. She had sole discretion at first, and wrote approximately ten drafts. Realising it held "a perfect three-act structure", Moggach attempted to be as faithful to the original novel as possible, calling it "so beautifully shaped as a story—the ultimate romance about two people who think they hate each other but who are really passionately in love. I felt, 'If it's not broken, don't fix it.'" While she could not reproduce the novel's "fiercely wonderful dialogue in its entirety", she sought to keep much of it.

Moggach's first draft was closest to Austen's book, but later versions excised storylines and characters. Moggach initially wrote all scenes from Elizabeth's point of view in keeping with the novel; she later set a few scenes from a male perspective, such as when Bingley practices his marriage proposal, to "show Darcy and Bingley being close" and to indicate Darcy was a "human being instead of being stuck up". Small details were inserted that acknowledged events outside the characters' circle, such as those then occurring in France. Moggach is the only credited screenwriter, but playwright Lee Hall provided early additions.

Director Joe Wright, whose earlier work was in television, was hired in early 2004, for his feature film directorial debut. He was considered a surprising choice for a film in the romance drama genre due to his past work with social realism. Wright's body of work had impressed the producers, who were looking for a fresh perspective; they sent him a script even though Wright had not read the novel. He stated in interview (with Sara Michelle Fetters of MovieFreak.com) that at the time, "I didn't know if I was really all that interested; I thought I was a little bit more mainstream than this, a bit more edgy. But then I read the script and I was surprised I was very moved by it". He went on to say that on reading the novel, he found it "an amazing piece of character observation [that] really seemed like the first piece of British Realism. It felt like it was a true story; had a lot of truth in it about understanding how to love other people, understanding how to overcome prejudices, understanding the things that separate us from other people ... things like that".

"I wanted to make something that is about young people, about young people experiencing these emotions for the first time and not understanding the feelings they are having. If you have a 40-year-old man as your star not understanding the feeling he's having then it becomes a bit unbelievable and suspect, rather like The 40-Year-Old Virgin or something instead of Pride & Prejudice".

— Director Joe Wright commenting on the ages of the actors in the 1940 adaptation

Wright's interview goes on to disclose that the only adaptation of Pride and Prejudice that he had seen was the 1940 production, which was the last time the novel had been adapted into a feature film. He states that he purposely did not watch the other productions, both out of fear he would inadvertently steal ideas and because he wanted to be as original as possible. But he did watch other period films, including Ang Lee's Sense and Sensibility, Roger Michell's Persuasion, and John Schlesinger's Far from the Madding Crowd. Wright cited this last film as the greatest influence on his own adaptation, calling it "very real and very honest—and it is quite romantic as well". In trying to create an atmosphere of charged flirtation, Wright was also inspired by teen romance films such as Sixteen Candles and The Breakfast Club.

Wright came on while Moggach was on her third draft. Despite her desire to work closely with Austen's dialogue, Wright made an effort to not "be too reverential to [it]. I don't believe people spoke like that then; it's not natural." While a few scenes, such as the discussion over accomplished women, align closely with Austen's dialogue, many others "substituted instead a mixture of modern idiom and archaic-sounding sentence structure". One alteration concerned politeness; Wright noted that while Austen's work had characters waiting before speaking, he believed that "particularly in big families of girls, everyone tends to speak over each other, finishing each other's sentences, etc. So I felt that the Bennet family's conversations would be overlapping like that." Sense and Sensibility actress and screenwriter Emma Thompson aided in script development, though she opted to be uncredited. She advised the nervous Wright on adapting Austen for the screen and made dialogue recommendations, such as with parts of the Collins–Charlotte storyline.

Citing the year Austen first wrote a draft of the novel, (Note: Austen wrote a draft of First Impressions (later renamed Pride and Prejudice) between October 1796 and August 1797.) Wright and Moggach changed the period setting from 1813 (the novel's publication date) to the late 18th century partly because Wright wanted to highlight the differences within an England influenced by the French Revolution, as he was fascinated that it had "caused an atmosphere among the British aristocracy of fear". Wright also chose the earlier period because he hated dresses with an empire silhouette, which were popular in the later period. The decision helped make the film visually distinct from other Austen adaptations. In comparison to the popular 1995 BBC version, which features Colin Firth and Jennifer Ehle, producer Paul Webster desired to make an adaptation that "doesn't conform to the television drama stereotypes of a perfect clean Regency world". Wright and Moggach opted for a "muddy hem version" of Longbourn, presenting a more rural setting than previous adaptations out of a desire to depict the Bennets in "very close proximity to their rural life" and to emphasise their relative poverty. While the degree of poverty was criticised by some critics, Wright felt that the "mess adds to the drama of the predicament that the family were in", and helps contrast the Bennets, Darcys, and Bingleys.

=== Casting ===
Wright found casting the film difficult because he was very particular about "the types of people I wanted to work with". While interviewing to direct, he insisted that the actors match the ages of the characters in the novel. Wright specifically cast actors who had rapport on and off screen, and insisted that they partake in three weeks of rehearsal in improvisation workshops. He also had to balance who he thought was best for each role with what the producers wanted—mainly a big name. Though Wright had not initially pictured someone as attractive as Keira Knightley as Elizabeth, he cast her after realising that she "is really a tomboy [and] has a lively mind and a great sense of humour". On The Graham Norton Show, Knightley said, "He initially thought I was too pretty, but then he met me and said "Oh, no, you're fine!". Knightley at the time was known for Bend It Like Beckham and the Pirates of the Caribbean film series. She had been an Austen fan since the age of seven, but initially feared taking the role out of apprehension that she would be doing "an absolute copy of Jennifer Ehle's performance", which she deeply admired. Knightley believed Elizabeth is "what you aspire to be: she's funny, she's witty and intelligent. She's a fully rounded and very much loved character." For the period, she studied etiquette, history and dancing, but ran into trouble when she acquired a short haircut while preparing for her role in the bounty hunter film Domino.

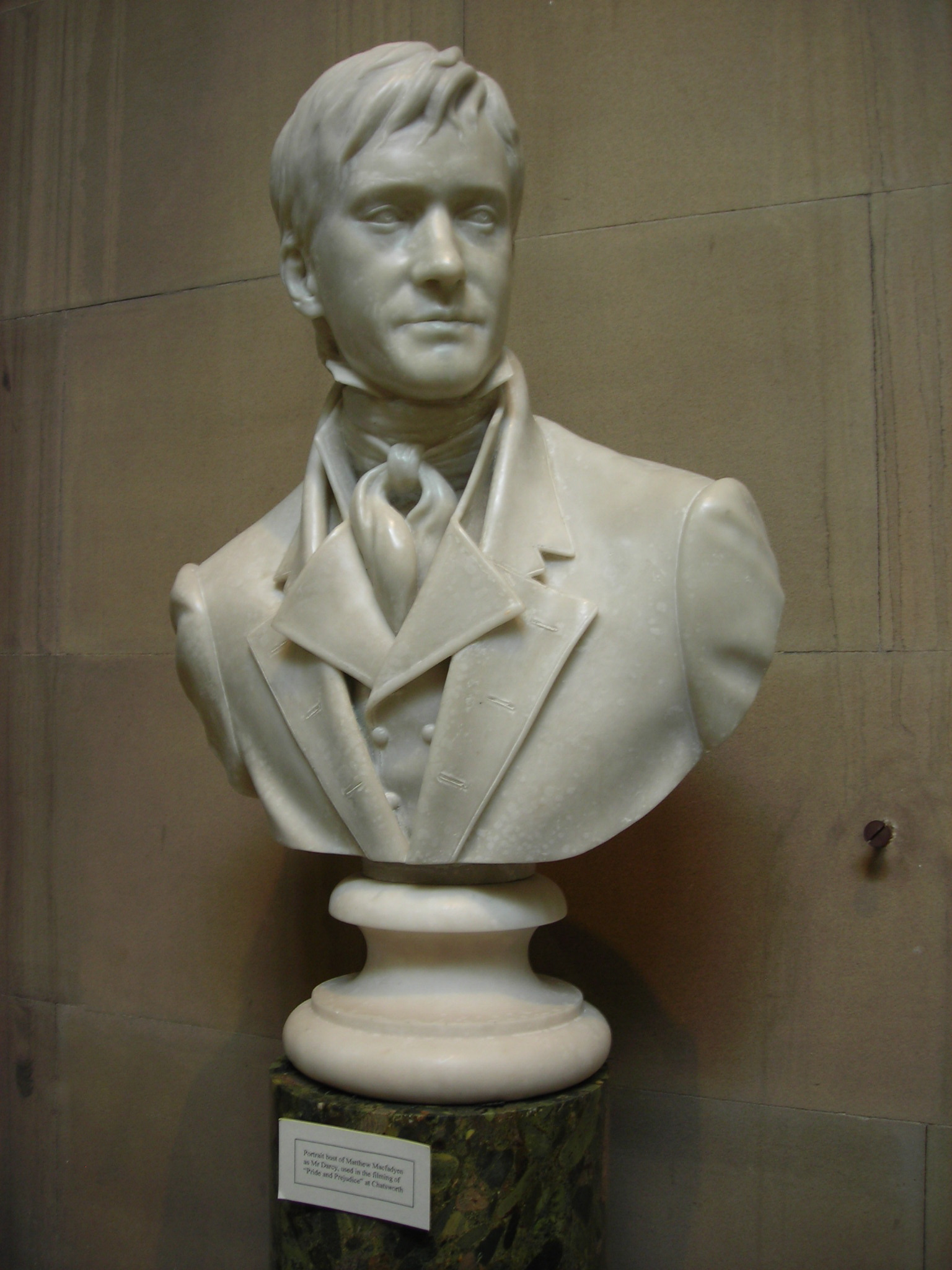
Bust of Mr Darcy played by Matthew Macfadyen. Keira Knightley's name recognition allowed the casting of Macfadyen, who was little known internationally.

Webster found casting Darcy especially hard due to the character's iconic status and because "Colin Firth cast a very long shadow". Wright later said that casting Knightley allowed him to cast comparative unknown Matthew Macfadyen, which would have been impossible had he chosen a lesser-known actress for Elizabeth. Macfadyen at the time was known for his role in the British television spy series Spooks, but had no recognition internationally. A fan of his television work, Wright called Macfadyen "a proper manly man ... I didn't want a pretty boy kind of actor. His properties were the ones I felt I needed [for Darcy]. Matthew's a great big hunk of a guy."

According to Wright, Rosamund Pike was cast as Jane "because I knew she wasn't going to play her as a nice, simple person. Jane has a real interior world, she has her heart broken". Despite being Pike's ex-boyfriend, Simon Woods was cast as her romantic interest, Mr Bingley. The other three Bennet sisters were played by Talulah Riley, Carey Mulligan, and Jena Malone, the only American actress among them. Wright believed Malone had a "pretty faultless English accent". Mulligan heard about the casting call at a dinner hosted by Julian Fellowes, to whom she had written a letter after failing to get into drama school; she won the part after three auditions. Tamzin Merchant appears as Georgiana Darcy; she was hired despite having no previous acting experience after she wrote a letter to the casting director. In addition to Merchant, Pride & Prejudice was the feature film debut of both Mulligan and Riley.

Donald Sutherland reminded Wright of his own father and was cast as Mr Bennet; Wright thought Sutherland had the "strength to handle those six women". Brenda Blethyn was hired to play Mrs Bennet, whom Moggach considered the film's unsung heroine; he said it was "a tricky part, as she can be very annoying; you want to stop her chattering and shrieking. But Brenda has the humour and the heart to show the amount of love and care Mrs Bennet has for her daughters." Wright convinced Judi Dench to join the cast as Lady Catherine de Bourgh by writing her a letter that read "I love it when you play a bitch. Please come and be a bitch for me." Dench had only one week available to shoot her scenes, forcing Wright to make them his first days of filming.

=== Costume design ===
Jacqueline Durran designed the Bennet sisters' costumes based on their characters' specific characteristics. From left: Mary, Elizabeth, Jane, Mrs Bennet, Kitty and Lydia.

Known for her BAFTA Award-winning work on the 2004 film Vera Drake, Jacqueline Durran was hired as the costume designer. She and Wright approached his film "as a difficult thing to tackle" because of their desire to distinguish it from the television adaptation. Due to Wright's dislike of the high waistline, Durran focused on later 18th-century fashions that often include a corseted, natural waistline rather than an empire silhouette (which became popular after the 1790s). A generational divide was established: the older characters dress in mid-18th-century fashions while the young wear "a sort of proto-Regency style of hair and dress".

Durran's costumes also help emphasise the characters' social rank; Caroline Bingley, for instance, is introduced in an empire silhouetted dress, clothing that would have then been at the height of fashion. Durran said that all the women wear white at the Netherfield Ball due to its contemporary popularity, an idea that Wright credits as his reason for hiring her. Costumes and hairstyles were adjusted to appeal to contemporary audiences, sacrificing historical accuracy.

To help differentiate the Bennet sisters, Durran viewed Elizabeth as the "tomboy", clothing her in earthy colours because of her love of the countryside. Of the others, Durran said, "Jane was the most refined and yet it's still all a bit slapdash and homemade, because the Bennets have no money. One of the main things Joe wanted was for the whole thing to have a provincial feel. Mary is the bluestocking: serious and practical. And then Lydia and Kitty are a bit Tweedledum and Tweedledee in a kind of teenage way. I tried to make it so that they'd be sort of mirror images. If one's wearing a green dress, the other will wear a green jacket; so you always have a visual asymmetry between the two." In contrast to the 1940 film, the 2005 production clothes the Bennet sisters in worn-down but comfortable dresses.

Mr Darcy's costume went through a series of phases. Durran noted:

The first time we see him he's at Meriton [sic], where he has a very stiffly tailored jacket on and he's quite contained and rigid. He stays in that rigid form for the first part of the film. By the time we get to the proposal that goes wrong in the rain, we move to a similar cut, but a much softer fabric. And then later he's got a completely different cut of coat, not interlined and he wears it undone. The nth degree is him walking through the mist in the morning, completely undressed by 18th-century standards. It's absolutely unlikely, but then Lizzie's in her nightie, so what can you say?

=== Filming ===
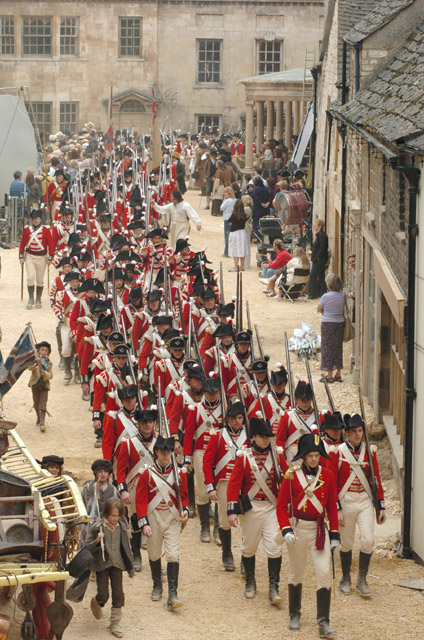
Stamford, Lincolnshire represented the fictional village of Meryton. (Filming of the militia pictured)

Moggach believed the novel was very filmable, "despite it containing no description and being a very unvisual book". To Wright, many other period films had relied on paintings for inspiration rather than photographs, causing them to appear unreal. He thus used Austen's prose to give him "many visual references for the people in the story", including close-up shots of the characters. The filmmakers also changed several scenes to more romantic locales than those in the book. For instance, in the film, Darcy first proposes outdoors in a rainstorm at a building with neoclassical architecture; in the book, this scene takes place in a parsonage. In the film, his second proposal occurs on the misty moors as dawn breaks; in the book, he and Elizabeth are walking down a country lane in broad daylight. Wright has acknowledged that "there are a lot of period film clichés; some of them are in the film and some are not, but for me it was important to question them".

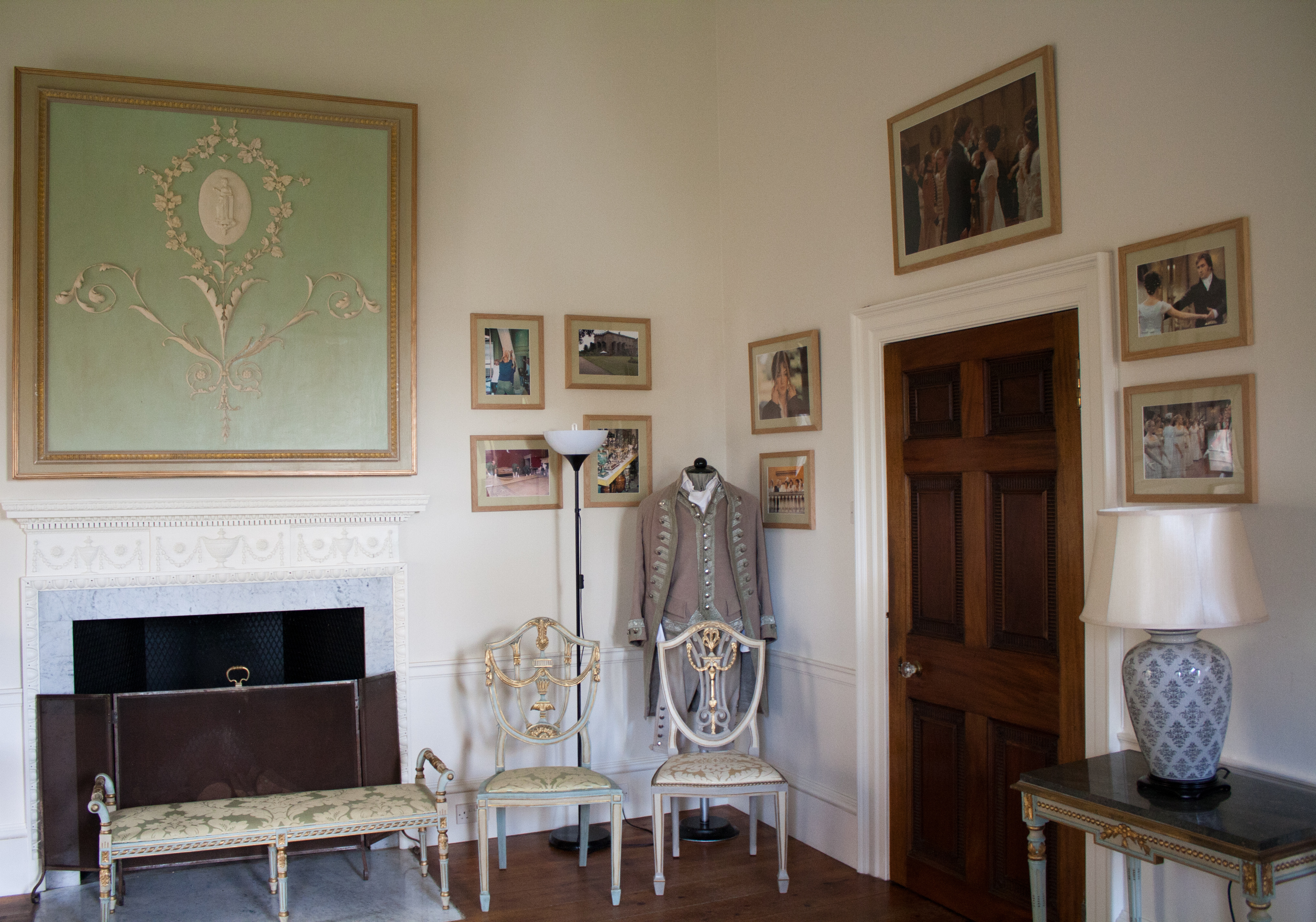
Pride & Prejudice exhibition in Basildon Park, which was used as the location of Netherfield, home of George Bingley

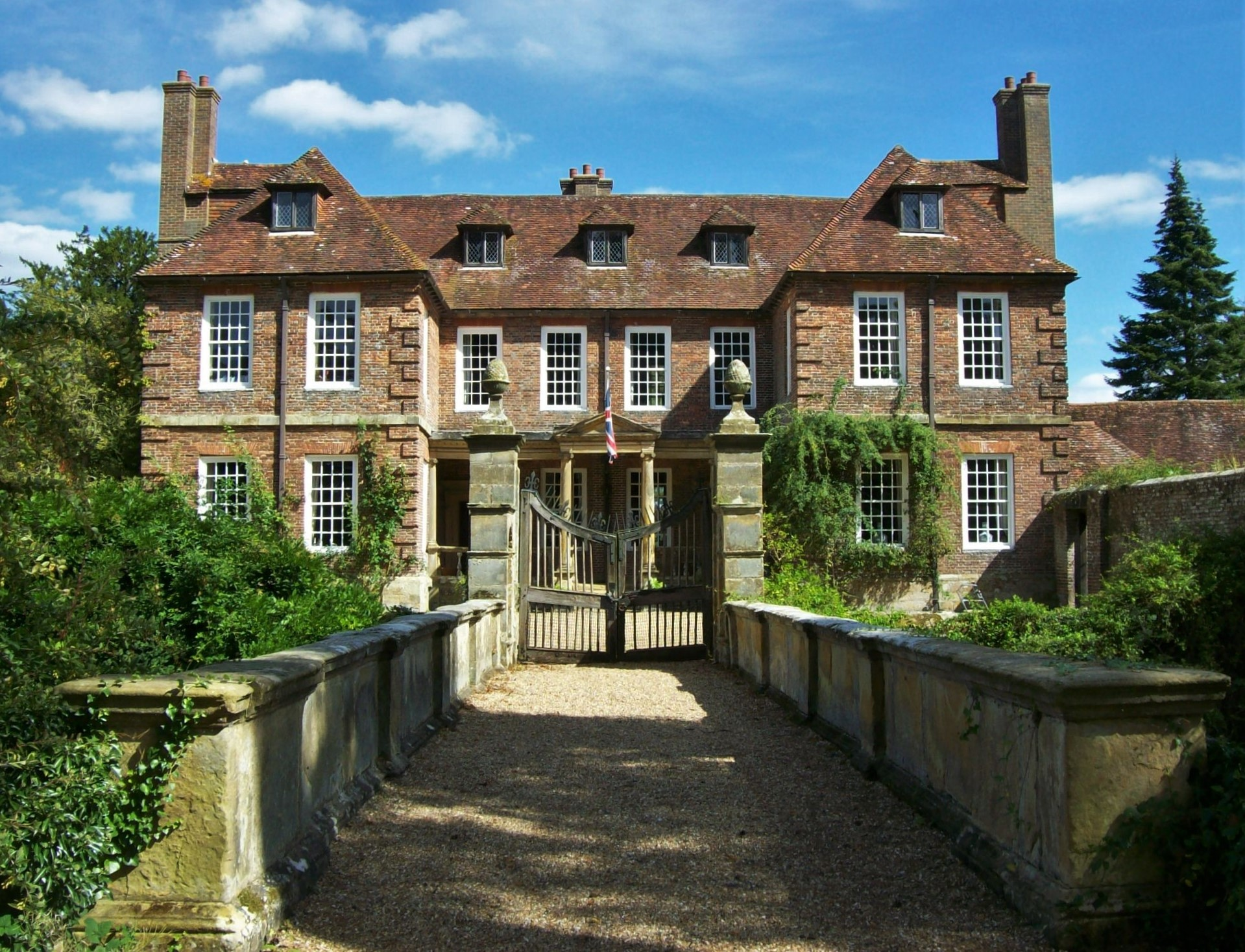
Groombridge Place served as the filming location of the Bennet family house

During script development, the crew created a "constant going back and forth between script and location". The film was shot entirely on location in England on an 11-week schedule during the 2004 summer. Co-producer Paul Webster said, "it is quite unusual for a movie this size to be shot entirely on location. Part of Joe's idea was to try to create a reality which allows the actors to relax and feel at one with their environment." Working under production designer Sarah Greenwood and set decorator Katie Spencer, the crew filmed on seven estates in six different counties. Because "nothing exists in the United Kingdom that is untouched by the twenty-first century", many of the sites required substantial work to make them suitable for filming. Visual effects company Double Negative digitally restored several locations to make them contemporaneous; they eradicated weeds, enhanced gold plating on window frames, and removed anachronisms such as gravel driveways and electricity pylons. Double Negative also developed the typeface used for the film's title sequence.

Production staff selected particularly grand-looking residences to better convey certain characters' wealth and power. Locations include Chatsworth House in Derbyshire, the largest privately held country house in England, with rooms frescoed by Antonio Verrio. Many believe Chatsworth House to have been Austen's inspiration for Pemberley. Chatsworth and Wilton House in Salisbury stood in for it. After a search of various sites in England, the moated manor house Groombridge Place in Kent was chosen for Longbourn. Location manager Adam Richards said Groombridge had an "immense charm" that was "untouched by post-17th Century development". Reflecting Wright's choice of realism, Groombridge's interior was designed to be "shabby chic". Representing Netherfield Park was the late-18th-century site Basildon Park in Berkshire, leading it to close for seven weeks for filming. Burghley House in Lincolnshire stood in for Rosings, while the adjacent town of Stamford served as Meryton. Other locations included Haddon Hall (for The Inn at Lambton), the Temple of Apollo and Palladian Bridge of Stourhead (for the Gardens of Rosings), Hunsford (for Collins' parsonage and church) and Peak District (for Elizabeth and the Gardiners' tour). The first dance scenes were shot on a set in a potato warehouse in Lincolnshire with the employment of local townspeople as extras; this was the only set the crew built that was not already in existence.

=== Music ===
Italian composer Dario Marianelli wrote the soundtrack. It is performed by the French pianist Jean-Yves Thibaudet accompanied by the English Chamber Orchestra.

The early piano sonatas of Ludwig van Beethoven "became a point of reference" and "starting point" for the score. Some pieces were inspired by the film's period, with the assumption that they could conceivably have been heard during that time and contained actual dance cues that befitted the late 18th century. Pieces that actors perform were composed first, before filming began.

The soundtrack contains 17 instrumental tracks of music organised in a different way from the film.

=== Editing ===
You have to be true to the integrity of the book and to Jane Austen, but then you also have to be quite ruthless. What you don't see, you don't miss ... By focusing on Elizabeth Bennett and what's happening to her, and her gruelling and difficult journey, certain things slough off as you go along.

— Deborah Moggach on editing the film

In contrast to the five-hour BBC adaptation, Wright's film is two hours and nine minutes long. He said the film is "obviously about Elizabeth and Darcy, following them, and anything that detracts or diverts you from that story is what you have to cut". Some of the most notable changes from the book include time compression of several major sequences, including the departure of Wickham and the militia, Elizabeth's visit to Rosings Park and Hunsford Parsonage, Elizabeth's visit to Pemberley, Lydia's elopement and subsequent crisis; the elimination of several supporting characters, including Mr and Mrs Hurst, Mr and Mrs Phillips, Lady and Maria Lucas, Mrs Younge, several of Lydia's friends (including Colonel and Mrs Forster) and various military officers and townspeople; and the elimination of several sections in which characters reflect or converse on events that have recently occurred—for example, Elizabeth's chapter-long change of mind after reading Darcy's letter.

Moggach and Wright debated how to end the film, but knew they did not want to have a wedding scene "because we didn't want Elizabeth to come off as the girl who became a queen at this lavish wedding, or for it to be corny". Shortly before the North American release, the film was modified to include a final scene (not in the novel) of the married Darcys enjoying a romantic evening and passionate kiss at Pemberley in an attempt to attract sentimental viewers; this became a source of complaint for the Jane Austen Society of North America (JASNA). After watching a preview of the film before its wide release, former JASNA president Elsa Solender said, "It has nothing at all of Jane Austen in it, is inconsistent with the first two-thirds of the film, insults the audience with its banality and ought to be cut before release". It had been removed from the British version after preview audiences found it unintentionally humorous, but later audiences complained that they were excluded from viewing this version, causing the film to be re-released in the UK and Ireland 10 weeks after the original UK premiere. The original British version ends with Mr Bennet's blessing upon Elizabeth and Darcy's union, circumventing the novel's last chapter, which summarises the lives of the Darcys and the other main characters over the next several years.

== Major themes and analysis ==
=== Romanticism and realism ===
Film, literary, and Austen scholars noted the appearance of romance and romanticism in Pride & Prejudice, especially in comparison to previous adaptations. Sarah Ailwood marked the film as "an essentially Romantic interpretation of Austen's novel", citing as evidence Wright's attention to nature as a means to "position Elizabeth and Darcy as Romantic figures ... Wright's Pride & Prejudice takes as its central focus Austen's concern with exploring the nature of the Romantic self and the possibilities for women and men to achieve individual self-fulfillment within an oppressive patriarchal social and economic order." Likewise, Catherine Stewart-Beer of Oxford Brookes University called Elizabeth's presence on the Derbyshire cliff a "stunning, magical evocation of Wright's strong stylistic brand of Postmodern Romanticism", but found this less like Austen and more reminiscent of Emily Brontë's Wuthering Heights. In her analysis, University of Provence scholar Lydia Martin concluded that the "Romantic bias of the film is shown through the shifts in the characters' relationships, the soundtrack and the treatment of landscape".

Realism is a prominent aspect of the film, as Wright confirmed in interviews as well as the DVD audio commentary. In a 2007 article, Ursinus College film studies professor Carole Dole argued that Pride & Prejudice is "a hybrid that embraces both an irreverent realism to which younger audiences are accustomed (and which reflects the director's realist aesthetic) and the classic heritage film's reverence for country houses, attractive landscapes and authentic period detail". Such "irreverent realism" included the depiction of Longbourn as a working farm complete with chickens, cattle and pigs; as Dole explains, "The agricultural realities of 1790s England are equally evident in the enclosed yard with barn and hay where Lizzie twirls barefoot over the mud on a rope swing". Referring to adaptations such as 1999's gritty Mansfield Park, Dole cited Pride & Prejudice as evidence that the heritage film is still around but has "been transformed into a more flexible genre". Jessica Durgan agreed with this assessment, writing that the film "simultaneously reject[s] and embrac[es] heritage to attract a larger audience".

=== Family ===
Raised with three sisters, Moggach was particularly interested in the story's family dynamics. Brock University professor Barbara K. Seeber believed that in contrast to the novel, the film emphasises the familial over the romantic. Evidence of this can be seen in how Pride & Prejudice "significantly recast the Bennet family, in particular its patriarch, presenting Mr Bennet as a sensitive and kind father whose role in the family's misfortunes is continually downplayed." Seeber further observed that the film is "the first to present Mrs Bennet in a sympathetic light", with Mr Bennet displayed as "an attentive husband as well as a loving father."

Stewart-Beer and Austen scholar Sally B. Palmer noted alterations of the depiction of the Bennet family; Stewart-Beer wrote that while their family home "might be chaotic, in this version it is, at heart, a happy home—much happier and much less dysfunctional, than Austen's original version of Longbourn ... For one, Mr and Mrs Bennet actually seem to like each other, even love each other, a characterisation which is a far cry from the source text." Producer Paul Webster acknowledged the familial theme in the DVD featurette "A Bennet Family Portrait", saying, "Yes, it's a great love story between Elizabeth Bennet and Fitzwilliam Darcy, but underpinning it all is the kind of love that runs this family."

=== Depiction of Elizabeth Bennet ===
Wright intended the film to be "as subjective as possible"; it introduces Darcy only when Elizabeth meets him. This focus on Elizabeth's perspective involves some dramatic changes from the novel. Knightley's Elizabeth has an "increasingly aloof and emotionally distant" relationship with her family, as can be seen in her gradual alienation from Jane; in the book, Elizabeth confides more of her feelings to Jane after difficult events. Wright states in his audio commentary for the film that he wanted to create a "real" relationship between the two and have them grow apart, as he thought the book depicted them as too "syrupy." Moggach's intent was for Elizabeth to "keep secrets to herself. They are a great burden to her ... As she keeps all this to herself, we feel for her more and more. The truest comedy, I believe, is born from pain."

In her "feisty, impassioned" interactions with Darcy and "rebellious refusal to 'perform'" for Lady Catherine, Stewart-Beer sees Knightley's depiction as "far removed from Austen's original Elizabeth, who has a greater sense of grounded maturity, even though both Elizabeths have an occasional inclination to fluster, fun and giggles." According to George Washington University professor Laurie Kaplan, Wright's focus on Elizabeth is consistent with the novel, but because the screenplay removes her line "Till this moment, I never knew myself", which Kaplan calls Elizabeth's "most important", it "violates not only the spirit and the essence of Austen's story but the viewer's expectations as well."

== Release ==
=== Marketing ===
After a string of Jane Austen semi-adaptations in the late 1990s and early 2000s, (Note: Recent Austen adaptations included Mansfield Park (1999), Bridget Jones's Diary (2001), Pride & Prejudice: A Latter-Day Comedy (2003), and Bride and Prejudice (2004).) Pride & Prejudice was positioned to take audiences "back into the world of period drama and what many saw as a more authentic version of Austen." While the novel was known to audiences, the large number of related productions required the film to distinguish itself. It was marketed to attract mainstream, young viewers, with one observer calling it "the ultimate chick-flick romance" and "more commercial than previous big-screen Austen adaptations." Another wrote that it brings "millennial girlhood to the megaplex ... If Ehle's Lizzie is every forty-, or fifty-something's favorite independent, even 'mature,' Austen heroine, Knightley is every twenty-something's sexpot good girl." An ampersand replaced the word "and" in the film title, similarly to the 1996 postmodern film Romeo + Juliet.

Already a star at the time of release, Knightley was featured in all the film's promotional materials (much like Colin Firth in the 1995 adaptation). Several commentators likened the main poster of Pride & Prejudice to that of 1995's Sense and Sensibility, which was seen as an attempt to attract the same demographic. Advertising noted that the film came "from the producers of Bridget Jones's Diary", a 2001 romantic comedy film, before mentioning Austen. Leading up to the release, fans were allowed to download pictures and screensavers online, which emphasised the differences between Pride & Prejudice and previous adaptations. Lydia Martin wrote that in contrast to past Pride and Prejudice productions, marketing materials downplayed the "suggested antagonism between the heroes" in favour of highlighting a "romantic relationship", as can be seen with the positioning of the characters as well as the tagline "Sometimes the last person on earth you want to be with is the one you can't be without."

=== Box office ===
On 11 September 2005, Pride & Prejudice premiered at the Toronto International Film Festival as a special Gala Presentation. The film was released in cinemas on 16 September in the United Kingdom and Ireland. It achieved the number one spot in its first week, grossing £2.5 million ($4.6 million) while playing on 397 screens. The film stayed at the top for two more weeks, grossing by then a total of over £9 million at the UK box office. It was featured on 412 screens at its widest domestic release.

In October 2005, the film opened at number one in Australia, with an opening weekend gross of $1.6 million.

On 11 November 2005, the film debuted in the United States with an opening weekend of $2.9 million on 215 screens. Two weeks later, it played on 1,299 screens and box office returns increased to $7.2 million; the film left cinemas the week of 24 February 2006 with a total US gross of $38,405,088. Jack Foley, the president of distribution of Focus Features, the film's US distributor, attributed Pride & Prejudice's success in America to Austen's appeal to "the boomer market" and its status as a known "brand".

Pride & Prejudice was released in 59 more countries between September 2005 and May 2006 by United International Pictures. With a worldwide gross of $121,147,947, it was the 72nd-highest-grossing film of 2005 in the US and the 41st-highest internationally.

=== Home media ===
In the US and UK, Universal Studios Home Entertainment released the standard VHS and DVD in February 2006 for both widescreen and fullframe; attached bonus features included audio commentary by director Joe Wright, a look into Austen's life and the ending scene of Elizabeth and Darcy kissing. On 13 November 2007, Universal released the deluxe edition DVD to coincide with the theatrical arrival of Wright's 2007 film Atonement. The deluxe edition included both widescreen and fullscreen features, the original soundtrack CD, a collectible book and booklet, as well as a number of special features not included in the original DVD. In the US, a Blu-ray version of the film was released by Universal on 26 January 2010, which also contained bonus features.

=== 2025 re-release ===
For its 20th anniversary, film was re-released on 18 April 2025. In addition to the theatrical showing, the soundtrack was released on vinyl. The re-release made $5 million by its second weekend.

== Reception ==
=== Critical response ===
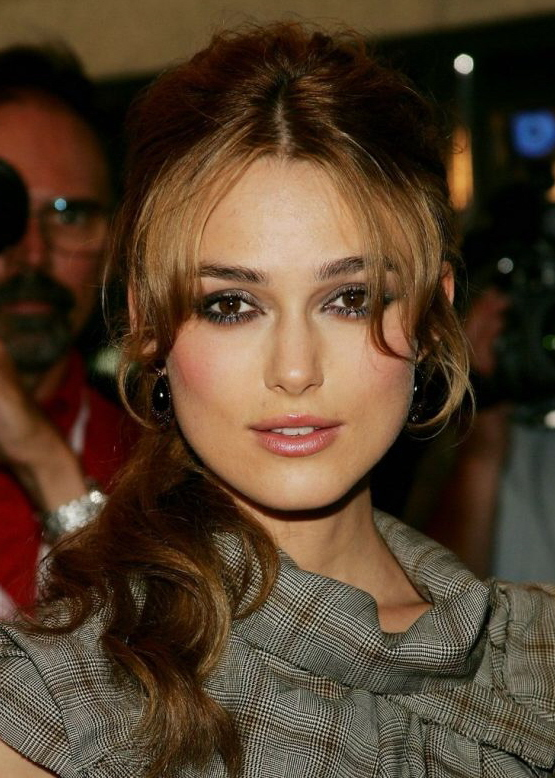
Keira Knightley's performance earned the 20-year-old her first nomination for the Academy Award for Best Actress, becoming the third-youngest Best Actress nominee at the time.

Pride & Prejudice was only the second film version after "the famed, but oddly flawed, black-and-white 1940 adaptation, starring Greer Garson and Laurence Olivier", and until 2005, The Times considered the 1995 television adaptation "so dominant, so universally adored, [that] it has lingered in the public consciousness as a cinematic standard". Wright's film consequently met with some scepticism from Austen's admirers, especially in relation to plot changes and casting choices. "Any resemblance to scenes and characters created by Miss Austen is, of course, entirely coincidental", mocked The New Yorker's film critic. Given Austen's characters were landed gentry, especially criticised was the reimagining of the Bennets as country bumpkins, lacking even the basics of table manners, and their home "a barnyard".

Comparing six major adaptations of Pride and Prejudice in 2005, The Daily Mirror gave the only marks of nine out of ten to the 1995 serial and the 2005 film, leaving the other adaptations with six or fewer points. On the review aggregation website Rotten Tomatoes, the film has an approval rating of 87% based on reviews from 186 critics, with an average rating of 7.7/10. The website's consensus reads: "Sure, it's another adaptation of cinema's fave Jane Austen novel, but key performances and a modern filmmaking sensibility make this familiar period piece fresh and enjoyable." On Metacritic the film has an average score of 82 out of 100, based on 37 reviews. Audiences surveyed by CinemaScore gave the film a grade "A−" on scale of A to F.

Critics claimed the film's time constraints did not capture the depth and complexity of the television serials. Professor of English and president of the Jane Austen Society of North America, Joan Klingel Ray, preferred the young age of Knightley and Macfadyen, but objected strongly to the film's frequent divergence from the novel. Citing several scenes, she observed, "None of this is Jane Austen". Peter Bradshaw of The Guardian, while praising Knightley for an outstanding performance "which lifts the whole movie", considered the casting of the leads "arguably a little more callow than Firth and Ehle". But he added, "Only a snob, a curmudgeon, or someone with necrophiliac loyalty to the 1995 BBC version with Colin Firth and Jennifer Ehle could fail to enjoy [Knightley's] performance." At the time, BBC film critic Stella Papamichael considered it Knightley's "best performance yet". The Daily Telegraph critic thought Knightley's acting skills slight, calling her "Someone who radiates little more than good-mannered perkiness", and wrote that between her and Macfadyen there was "little spark".

Critics were divided about Macfadyen's portrayal of Darcy, expressing pleasant surprise, dislike for his lack of gradual emotional shift as in the novel, and praise for his matching the book character's insecurity and sensitivity better than Firth.

Critics also drew attention to other aspects of the film. Writing for The Sydney Morning Herald, Sandra Hall criticised Wright's attention to realism as "careless with the customs and conventions that were part of the fabric of Austen's world". Time Out magazine lamented the absence of Austen's "brilliant sense of irony", remarking that the film's "romantic melodrama's played up at the expense of her razor-sharp wit." Derek Elley of Variety magazine praised Wright and Moggach for "extracting the youthful essence" of the novel while also "providing a richly detailed setting" under Greenwood and Durran's supervision. Equally pleased with the film was the San Francisco Chronicle's Ruthe Stein, who wrote that Wright made a "spectacular feature film debut" that is "creatively reimagined and sublimely entertaining". Claudia Puig of USA Today called it "a stellar adaptation, bewitching the viewer completely and incandescently with an exquisite blend of emotion and wit".

=== Accolades ===
Award	Category	Recipients	Result
Academy Awards	Best Actress	Keira Knightley	Nominated
Academy Awards	Best Art Direction	Sarah Greenwood, Katie Spencer	Nominated
Academy Awards	Best Costume Design	Jacqueline Durran	Nominated
Academy Awards	Best Original Score	Dario Marianelli	Nominated
American Cinema Editors	Best Edited Feature Film – Comedy or Musical	Paul Tothill	Nominated
Boston Society of Film Critics	Best New Filmmaker	Joe Wright	Won
British Academy Film Awards	Best British Film	Pride & Prejudice	Nominated
British Academy Film Awards	Best Actress in a Supporting Role	Brenda Blethyn	Nominated
British Academy Film Awards	Most Promising Newcomer	Joe Wright	Won
British Academy Film Awards	Best Adapted Screenplay	Deborah Moggach	Nominated
British Academy Film Awards	Best Costume Design	Jacqueline Durran	Nominated
British Academy Film Awards	Best Makeup & Hair	Fae Hammond	Nominated
Broadcast Film Critics Association	Best Actress	Keira Knightley	Nominated
Chicago Film Critics Association	Best Actress	Keira Knightley	Nominated
Chicago Film Critics Association	Best Cinematography	Roman Osin	Nominated
Chicago Film Critics Association	Best Supporting Actor	Donald Sutherland	Nominated
Chicago Film Critics Association	Most Promising Filmmaker	Joe Wright	Nominated
Empire Awards	Best Actress	Keira Knightley	Nominated
Empire Awards	Best British Film	Pride & Prejudice	Won
Empire Awards	Best Director	Joe Wright	Nominated
European Film Awards	Best Cinematographer	Roman Osin	Nominated
European Film Awards	Best Composer	Dario Marianelli	Nominated
European Film Awards	Best Film	Joe Wright	Nominated
Golden Globe Awards	Best Actress – Motion Picture Musical or Comedy	Keira Knightley	Nominated
Golden Globe Awards	Best Film – Musical or Comedy	Pride & Prejudice	Nominated
London Film Critics' Circle	British Actress of the Year	Keira Knightley	Nominated
London Film Critics' Circle	British Director of the Year	Joe Wright	Won
London Film Critics' Circle	British Film of the Year	Pride & Prejudice	Nominated
London Film Critics' Circle	British Newcomer of the Year	Matthew Macfadyen	Nominated
London Film Critics' Circle	British Newcomer of the Year	Joe Wright	Nominated
London Film Critics' Circle	British Supporting Actor of the Year	Tom Hollander	Won
London Film Critics' Circle	British Supporting Actress of the Year	Brenda Blethyn	Nominated
London Film Critics' Circle	British Supporting Actress of the Year	Rosamund Pike	Nominated

== Influence and legacy ==
Three years after the release, Knightley was still associated with Elizabeth Bennet among a generation of young viewers who had not seen the 1995 production. Given the varied opinions about the film, The Jane Austen Society of North America (JASNA) published a special issue of its online journal, Persuasions On-Line, in 2007 presenting the collaboration of 19 Austen scholars from six countries; the intent was to foster discussion and stimulate scholarly analysis. JASNA had done this only once before, for the 1996 film Emma.

Pride & Prejudice influenced later productions in the costume drama and heritage film genres. Literary critics protested that Wright's adaptation effectively "popularized Austen's celebrated romance and brought her novel to the screen as an easy visual read for an undemanding mainstream audience". Carole Dole wrote that the film's success "only made it more likely that future adaptations of Austen will feature, if not necessarily mud, then at least youthful and market-tested performers and youth-orientated filmmaking techniques balanced with the visual pleasures of the heritage film." She cited Anne Hathaway in the 2007 film Becoming Jane as an example. Jessica Durgan added that Pride & Prejudice conceived a new hybrid genre by rejecting the visual cues of the heritage film, which attracted "youth and mainstream audiences without alienating the majority of heritage fans".

Production of Pride & Prejudice began Wright's relationship with Working Title Films, the first of four collaborations. Many members of the film's cast and crew joined Wright in his later efforts. For his adaptation of Atonement, which he viewed as "a direct reaction to Pride & Prejudice", Wright hired Knightley, Blethyn, Marianelli, Thibaudet, Greenwood, and Durran. Atonement has been noted to contain themes similar to Austen's, including the notion of a young writer living in "an isolated English country house" who "mixes up desires and fantasies, truths and fiction". Wright's 2009 film The Soloist included Hollander, Malone, and Marianelli, and Hollander was also featured in Hanna (2011). Wright's 2012 adaptation of Anna Karenina features Knightley, Macfadyen, Marianelli, Durran, and Greenwood and is produced by Bevan, Eric Fellner, and Webster.

In July 2025, the film ranked fiftieth on the "Readers' Choice" edition of The New York Times' list of "The 100 Best Movies of the 21st Century".

== See also ==
- Jane Austen in popular culture
- Janeite
- List of literary adaptations of Pride and Prejudice
- 2005 in film
- List of British films of 2005
- List of oldest and youngest Academy Award winners and nominees – Youngest nominees for Best Actress in a Leading Role
- 78th Academy Awards
- 63rd Golden Globe Awards
- 59th British Academy Film Awards

== Bibliography ==
=== Books ===
- Andrew, Dudley (2011). "The Economies of Adaptation". True to the Spirit: Film Adaptation and the Question of Fidelity. Colin MacCabe, Rick Warner, Kathleen Murray (editors). Oxford University Press. pp. 27–40. ISBN 978-0-19-537467-4.
- Austen, Jane (2006). Jane Austen: Complete and Unabridged. Sarah S.G. Frantz (editor). Barnes & Noble Publishing, Inc. ISBN 0-7607-7401-3.
- Austen, Jane (2008). Pride and Prejudice: A Penguin Enhanced e-Book Classic. Vivian Jones, Tony Tanner, Juliette Wells (editors). Penguin Classics. ISBN 978-0-14-143951-8. Archived from the original on 27 June 2014.
- Brownstein, Rachel M. (2011). Why Jane Austen?. Columbia University Press. ISBN 978-0-231-15390-4.
- Cartmell, Deborah (2010). Screen Adaptations: Jane Austen's Pride and Prejudice: A Close Study of the Relationship between Text and Film. A&C Black Publishers Ltd. ISBN 978-1-4081-0593-1. Archived from the original on 23 June 2021.
- Copeland, Edward; McMaster, Juliet (2011). The Cambridge Companion to Jane Austen. Cambridge University Press. ISBN 978-0-521-74650-2.
- Dawson Edwards, Kyle (2008). Corporate Fictions: Film Adaptation and Authorship in the Classical Hollywood Era. ISBN 978-0-549-38632-2.
- Demory, Pamela (2010). "Jane Austen and the Chick Flick in the Twenty-first Century". Adaptation Studies: New Approaches. Christa Albrecht-Crane, Dennis Cutchins (editors). Rosemont Publishing & Printing Corp. pp. 121–149. ISBN 978-0-8386-4262-7. Archived from the original on 23 June 2021.
- Gymnich, Marion; Ruhl, Kathrin; Scheunemann, Klaus (2010). "Revisiting the Classical Romance: Pride and Prejudice, Bridget Jones's Diary and Bride and Prejudice". Gendered (Re)Visions: Constructions of Gender in Audiovisual Media. Bonn University Press. pp. 23–44. ISBN 978-3-89971-662-7. Archived from the original on 23 June 2021.
- Higson, Andrew (2011). Film England: Culturally English Filmmaking Since the 1990s. I.B. Tauris. ISBN 978-1-84885-454-3.
- Monaghan, David; Hudelet, Ariane; Wiltshire, John (2009). The Cinematic Jane Austen: Essays on the Filmic Sensibility of the Novels. McFarland & Company, Inc., Publishers. ISBN 978-0-7864-3506-7. Archived from the original on 22 June 2021.
- Silvers, Josh; Olsen, Toby D. (2011). "Pride and Prejudice: Establishing Historical Connections Among the Arts". Conjuring the Real: The Role of Architecture in Eighteenth- And Nineteenth-Century Fiction. Rumiko Handa, James Potter (editors), Iain Borden (foreword). University of Nebraska Press. pp. 191–214. ISBN 978-0-8032-1743-0.
- Troost, Linda V. (2007). "The Nineteenth-Century Novel on Film: Jane Austen". The Cambridge Companion to Literature on Screen. Deborah Cartmell, Imelda Whelehan (editors). Cambridge University Press. pp. 75–89. ISBN 978-0-521-61486-3.
- Whitlock, Cathy (2010). Designs on Film: A Century of Hollywood Art Direction. HarperCollins Publishers. ISBN 978-0-06-088122-1.

=== Essays and journals ===
- Ailwood, Sarah (Summer 2007). "What Are Men to Rocks and Mountains?' Romanticism in Joe Wright's Pride & Prejudice". Persuasions On-Line. 27 (2). Jane Austen Society of North America. Archived from the original on 25 January 2012.
- Camden, Jen (Summer 2007). "Sex and the Scullery: The New Pride & Prejudice". Persuasions On-Line. 27 (2). Jane Austen Society of North America. Archived from the original on 29 August 2011.
- Camden, Jen; Ford, Susan Allen (Summer 2007). "Something new to be observed ... for ever". Persuasions On-Line. 27 (2). Jane Austen Society of North America. Archived from the original on 26 June 2011.
- Chan, Mary (Summer 2007). "Location, Location, Location: The Spaces of Pride & Prejudice". Persuasions On-Line. 27 (2). Jane Austen Society of North America. Archived from the original on 14 June 2012.
- Dole, Carole (Summer 2007). "Jane Austen and Mud: Pride & Prejudice (2005), British Realism and the Heritage Film". Persuasions On-Line. 27 (2). Jane Austen Society of North America. Archived from the original on 26 June 2011.
- Durgan, Jessica (Summer 2007). "Framing Heritage: The Role of Cinematography in Pride & Prejudice". Persuasions On-Line. 27 (2). Jane Austen Society of North America. Archived from the original on 22 August 2011.
- Gilligan, Kathleen E. (2011). "Jane Austen's Unnamed Character: Exploring Nature in Pride and Prejudice (2005)". Student Pulse. 3 (12). Archived from the original on 24 November 2012.
- Kaplan, Laurie (Summer 2007). "Inside Out/Outside In: Pride & Prejudice on Film 2005". Persuasions On-Line. 27 (2). Jane Austen Society of North America. Archived from the original on 20 January 2012.
- Martin, Lydia (Summer 2007). "Joe Wright's Pride & Prejudice: From Classicism to Romanticism". Persuasions On-Line. 27 (2). Jane Austen Society of North America. Archived from the original on 20 January 2012.
- Palmer, Sally B. (Summer 2007). "Little Women at Longbourn: The Re-Wrighting of Pride and Prejudice". Persuasions On-Line. 27 (2). Jane Austen Society of North America. Archived from the original on 26 June 2011.
- Paquet-Deyris, Anne-Marie (Summer 2007). "Staging intimacy and interiority in Joe Wright's Pride & Prejudice (2005)". Persuasions On-Line. 27 (2). Jane Austen Society of North America. Archived from the original on 26 November 2010.
- Sabine, Maureen (Fall 2008). "With My Body I Thee Worship: Joe Wright's Erotic Vision in Pride & Prejudice (2005)". Journal of Religion and Popular Culture. 20: 5. doi:10.3138/jrpc.20.1.005. Archived from the original on 21 September 2011.
- Sadoff, Dianne F. (Spring 2010). "Marketing Jane Austen at the Megaplex". Novel: A Forum on Fiction. 43 (1): 83–92. doi:10.1215/00295132-2009-067.
- Seeber, Barbara K. (Summer 2007). "A Bennet Utopia: Adapting the Father in Pride and Prejudice". Persuasions On-Line. 27 (2). Jane Austen Society of North America. Archived from the original on 8 January 2012.
- Stewart-Beer, Catherine (Summer 2007). "Style over Substance? Pride & Prejudice (2005) Proves Itself a Film for Our Time". Persuasions On-Line. 27 (2). Jane Austen Society of North America. Archived from the original on 26 June 2011.
- Tandy, Ann M. (Summer 2007). "'Just What a Young Man Ought to Be': The 2005 Pride & Prejudice and Transitional Ideas of Gentility". Persuasions On-Line. 27 (2). Jane Austen Society of North America. Archived from the original on 26 June 2011.
- Wells, Juliette (Summer 2007). "A Fearsome Thing to Behold'? The Accomplished Woman in Joe Wright's 'Pride & Prejudice'". Persuasions On-Line. 27 (2). Jane Austen Society of North America. Archived from the original on 16 May 2012.
- Wells, Juliette (2008). "Shades of Austen in Ian McEwan's Atonement" (PDF). New Directions in Austen Studies. 30 (2): 101–112. Archived (PDF) from the original on 25 June 2011.
- Woodworth, Megan (Summer 2007). "'I am a gentleman's daughter'? Translating Class from Austen's Page to the Twenty-first-century Screen". Persuasions On-Line. 27 (2). Jane Austen Society of North America. Archived from the original on 26 June 2011.

=== Interviews ===
- DeGennaro, Alexa (12 November 2005). "Interview with New Pride and Prejudice Director Joe Wright". Yahoo!. Archived from the original on 5 February 2014.
- Fetters, Sara Michelle. "It's Austen All Over Again". MovieFreak.com. Archived from the original on 6 January 2012.
- Goldwasser, Dan (March 2006). "Interview – Dario Marianelli". Soundtrack.net. Archived from the original on 16 June 2010.
- Hanson, Briony; David Benedict (13 September 2005). "A masterclass with Deborah Moggach & Joe Wright". The Script Factory. Archived from the original on 11 August 2010.
- Hewitt, Chris (9 November 2005). "Unlikely Director Brought New Approach to Pride & Prejudice". Ottawa Citizen. ProQuest 240921209.
- Hoggard, Liz (10 September 2005). "Meet the puppet master". The Guardian. Archived from the original on 5 February 2014.
- Lee, Alana (September 2005). "BBC – Movies – interview – Keira Knightley". BBC. Archived from the original on 4 November 2012.
- Robey, Tim (3 February 2006). "How I undressed Mr Darcy". The Daily Telegraph. Archived from the original on 16 January 2012.
- Spunberg, Adam (1 April 2011). "Scripting Pride & Prejudice with Deborah Moggach". Picktainment.com. Archived from the original on 15 March 2012.

=== Newspaper and magazine articles ===
- Alberge, Dalya (11 June 2004). "Hunt for Darcy nets star of TV spy drama". The Times. ProQuest 319106084. (subscription required)
- "Austen story filmed at old house". BBC News. 19 July 2004. Archived from the original on 22 February 2014.
- Barraclough, Leo (21 December 2005). "Pride of crix kudos". Variety. Archived from the original on 23 June 2021.
- Bradshaw, Peter (16 September 2005). "Pride & Prejudice". The Guardian. Archived from the original on 10 June 2008.
- Bradshaw, Peter (25 September 2009). "The Soloist". The Guardian. Archived from the original on 8 October 2013.
- Briscoe, Joanna (31 July 2005). "A costume drama with muddy hems". The Times. Archived from the original on 15 June 2011.
- Dawtrey, Adam (19 January 2004). "London Eye". Variety.(subscription required)
- Edwards, David (9 September 2005). "Pride and Passion". Daily Mirror. London, England. Archived from the original on 11 June 2014 – via HighBeam Research.
- Elley, Derek (11 September 2005). "Pride & Prejudice (U.K.–U.S.)". Variety. Archived from the original on 23 June 2021.
- Gleiberman, Owen (9 November 2005). "Pride & Prejudice (2005)". Entertainment Weekly. Archived from the original on 4 June 2012.
- Hall, Sandra (20 October 2005). "Pride and Prejudice". The Sydney Morning Herald. Archived from the original on 30 June 2012.
- Hastings, Chris (8 August 2005). "Colin Firth was born to play Mr Darcy. So can anyone else shine in the lead role?". The Daily Telegraph. Archived from the original on 27 June 2008.
- Haun, Harry (1 November 2005). "Austentatious Debut". Film Journal International. Archived from the original on 5 February 2014.
- Holden, Stephen (11 November 2005). "Marrying Off Those Bennet Sisters Again, but This Time Elizabeth Is a Looker". The New York Times.
- Kimmel, Daniel M. (11 December 2005). "Boston film crix hail Brokeback, Capote". Variety. Archived from the original on 4 December 2020.
- McGhie, Caroline (24 August 2005). "A house in want of a fortune". The Daily Telegraph. Archived from the original on 23 June 2013.
- Papamichael, Stella (16 September 2005). "Pride & Prejudice (2005)". BBC. Archived from the original on 23 January 2011.
- Pham, Alex (24 July 2010). "COMIC-CON 2010: Zack Snyder's Sucker Punch goes for grrrl power". Los Angeles Times. Archived from the original on 11 November 2012.
- Puig, Claudia (10 November 2005). "This Pride does Austen proud". USA Today. Archived from the original on 19 May 2009.
- Roberts, Laura (16 December 2010). "British actresses who made their name starring in Jane Austen adaptations". The Daily Telegraph. Archived from the original on 24 January 2011.
- Rojas Weiss, Sabrina (11 November 2005). "Keira Knightley Has Austen Power". TV Guide. Archived from the original on 12 August 2010.
- Stein, Ruthe (11 November 2005). "Luscious new Pride & Prejudice updates the mating game". San Francisco Chronicle. Archived from the original on 15 February 2009.
- "Pride & Prejudice (2005)". Time Out. 14 September 2005. Archived from the original on 15 August 2012.
- Wloszczyna, Susan (13 November 2005). "It was the best kiss, it was the worst in Pride & Prejudice". USA Today. Archived from the original on 28 July 2010.
- Wloszczyna, Susan (6 September 2007). "Returning directors feel the warmth in fest spotlight". USA Today. Archived from the original on 13 October 2008.

=== Online ===
- "Nominees & Winners for the 78th Academy Awards". Academy of Motion Picture Arts and Sciences. Archived from the original on 9 March 2012.
- "Awards database". British Academy of Film and Television Arts. Archived from the original on 23 June 2021.
- "Pride and Prejudice (2005) – International Box Office Results". Box Office Mojo. Archived from the original on 5 February 2014.
- "Pride and Prejudice (2005)". Box Office Mojo. Archived from the original on 29 January 2012.
- "Pride and Prejudice (2005)". British Film Institute. Archived from the original on 5 February 2014.
- "The 11th Critics' Choice Movie Awards Winners and Nominees". Broadcast Film Critics Association. Archived from the original on 26 August 2012.
- Carrier, Steven (24 January 2006). "Pride & Prejudice (UK – DVD R2/5)". DVDactive. Archived from the original on 21 July 2013.
- Desowitz, Bill (22 September 2005). "Double Negative Does VFX for Pride & Prejudice". Animation World Network. Archived from the original on 23 June 2021.
- "Sony Ericsson Empire Awards 2006". Empire. Archived from the original on 16 June 2013.
- Gray, Brandon (14 November 2005). "Pride and Prejudice Impresses in Limited Bow". Box Office Mojo. Archived from the original on 13 February 2012.
- "63rd Golden Globe Awards Nominations". Hollywood Foreign Press Association. 13 December 2005. Archived from the original on 27 May 2012.
- Hall, Katy (18 March 2010). "Carey Mulligan Gets An Education In Movie Stardom". HuffPost. Archived from the original on 6 December 2013.
- "Weekend box office". Los Angeles Times. 15 November 2005. Archived from the original on 5 February 2014.
- McCarthy, Todd (30 March 2011). "Hanna: Movie Review". The Hollywood Reporter. Archived from the original on 9 December 2011.
- McCutcheon, David (21 December 2009). "Pride Finds Prejudice". IGN. Archived from the original on 20 July 2012.
- "Pride & Prejudice (2005 film): Reviews". Metacritic. Archived from the original on 24 February 2009.
- Monger, James Christopher. " The Soloist [Music from the Motion Picture]". AllMusic. Archived from the original on 23 June 2021.
- "Keira Knightley Hits The Red Carpet". MTV. 10 October 2005. Archived from the original on 21 February 2014.
- O'Brien, Jon. "Pride & Prejudice [Original Score]". AllMusic. Archived from the original on 23 June 2021.
- "Pride and Prejudice (2005)". Rotten Tomatoes. Archived from the original on 7 January 2012.
- Ruhlmann, William. "Pride & Prejudice [Original Score] Album Reviews". Billboard. Archived from the original on 22 January 2011.
- Soares, Andre (19 February 2006). "American Cinema Editors Awards 2006". Alt Film Guide. Archived from the original on 1 October 2012.
- Soares, Andre (9 January 2006). "Chicago Film Critics Awards 2005". Alt Film Guide. Archived from the original on 23 August 2011.
- Soares, Andre (2 December 2006). "European Film Awards 2006". Alt Film Guide. Archived from the original on 5 October 2012.
- "Pride and Prejudice". The Numbers. Archived from the original on 19 December 2011.
- "UK Box Office: 2005". UK Film Council. Archived from the original on 30 April 2012.
- Wightman, Catriona (12 November 2011). "Pride and Prejudice: Tube Talk Gold". Digital Spy. Archived from the original on 5 February 2014.
- Villa, Bernardita (11 December 2017). "Las series más vistas por los chilenos en Netflix" [The most watched TV series by chileans in Netflix] (in Spanish). Bio-Bio. Archived from the original on 17 December 2017.
- Gutiérrez, Catalina (14 December 2017). "Me gusta Orgullo y Prejuicio porque es feminista" [I like Pride & Prejudice because is a feminist film] (in Spanish). Women Talk. Archived from the original on 22 December 2017.

=== Press releases ===
- "Pride & Prejudice: The Locations" (Press release). Focus Features. 1 November 2005.
- "Pride & Prejudice: The Production" (Press release). Focus Features. 1 November 2005.
- "Nominated for Four Academy Awards(R)* Including Best Actress Keira Knightley Universal Studios Home Entertainment Is Proud to Announce the DVD Release of Jane Austen's Ultimate Romance Pride & Prejudice" (Press release). PR Newswire. 31 January 2006. Archived from the original on 5 February 2014.
- "From Universal Studios Home Entertainment: Pride & Prejudice 2 Disc Deluxe Gift Set" (Press release). PR Newswire. 20 September 2007. Archived from the original on 5 February 2014.
- "Pride & Prejudice gala screening in Toronto" (Press release). Working Title Films. 29 July 2005. Archived from the original on 4 November 2011.
- "Pride & Prejudice released this weekend" (Press release). Working Title Films. 15 September 2005. Archived from the original on 4 November 2011.
- "Pride & Prejudice is a number 1 hit" (Press release). Working Title Films. 19 September 2005. Archived from the original on 4 November 2011.
- "Pride & Prejudice – US ending now on release in UK" (Press release). Working Title Films. 25 November 2005. Archived from the original on 4 November 2011.
- "Pride & Prejudice wins six Bafta nominations" (Press release). Working Title Films. 19 January 2006. Archived from the original on 4 November 2011.
- "Production Commences on Anna Karenina" (Press release). Working Title Films. 3 October 2011. Archived from the original on 5 February 2014.

=== Visual media ===
- Knightley, Keira (2005). Pride & Prejudice: HBO First Look (DVD). Joe Wright, Tim Bevan, Deborah Moggach, Brenda Blethyn, Donald Sutherland. Bonus Features: Universal Studios.
- Sutherland, Donald (2005). Behind-the-Scenes at the Ball (DVD). Brenda Blethyn, Tom Hollander, Keira Knightley, Matthew Macfadyen, Talulah Riley, Carey Mulligan, Jena Malone, Rosamund Pike. Bonus Features: Universal Studios.
- Wright, Joe (2005). Audio commentary for Pride & Prejudice (DVD). Bonus Features: Universal Studios.
