= List of 2009 box office number-one films in the United Kingdom =

This is a list of films which have placed number one at the weekend box office in the United Kingdom during 2009.

== Films ==
†	This implies the highest-grossing movie of the year.

Week	Weekend End Date	Film	Total weekend gross (Pound sterling)	Weekend openings in the Top 10	Reference(s)
1	4 January 2009	Yes Man (Note: Opened in 2008)	£2,223,950	The Spirit (#6), The Reader (#7), Che Part One (#9)	
2	11 January 2009	Role Models	£2,330,145	Slumdog Millionaire (#2), Bride Wars (#3), Defiance (#4)	
3	18 January 2009	Slumdog Millionaire	£2,630,820	Seven Pounds (#2), My Bloody Valentine 3D (#3), Beverly Hills Chihuahua (#6), The Wrestler (#8)	
4	25 January 2009	Slumdog Millionaire	£2,806,996	Valkyrie (#2), Underworld: Rise of the Lycans (#5), Frost/Nixon (#9)	
5	1 February 2009	Slumdog Millionaire	£2,359,854	Revolutionary Road (#3), Nick & Norah's Infinite Playlist (#10)	
6	8 February 2009	The Curious Case of Benjamin Button	£2,213,495	He's Just Not That Into You (#2), The Secret of Moonacre (#6), Doubt (#9)	
7	15 February 2009	Bolt	£5,457,438	Hotel for Dogs (#5), Friday the 13th (#6), Notorious (#7), The Pink Panther 2 (#8), Vicky Cristina Barcelona (#9)	
8	22 February 2009	Bolt	£3,006,050	Confessions of a Shopaholic (#2), Push (#7)	
9	1 March 2009	Slumdog Millionaire	£1,676,508	Gran Torino (#2), The Unborn (#3), The International (#6), New in Town (#10)	
10	8 March 2009	Watchmen	£3,243,001	The Young Victoria (#4)	
11	15 March 2009	Marley & Me	£4,414,169	Bronson (#10)	
12	22 March 2009	Marley & Me	£2,166,270	Paul Blart: Mall Cop (#2), Duplicity (#3), Lesbian Vampire Killers (#4)	
13	29 March 2009	Knowing	£2,471,605	The Haunting in Connecticut (#3), The Damned United (#5)	
14	5 April 2009	Monsters vs. Aliens	£4,345,711	The Boat That Rocked (#2)	
15	12 April 2009	Fast & Furious	£4,928,784	17 Again (#3), Race to Witch Mountain (#6), Dragonball Evolution (#8)	
16	19 April 2009	Monsters vs. Aliens	£2,057,367	I Love You, Man (#4), Crank High Voltage (#5), In the Loop (#8)	
17	26 April 2009	State of Play	£1,513,951	The Uninvited (#7), Observe and Report (#8)	
18	3 May 2009	X-Men Origins: Wolverine	£6,658,979	Hannah Montana: The Movie (#2), Ghosts of Girlfriends Past (#4)	
19	10 May 2009	Star Trek	£5,950,203	Coraline (#2)	
20	17 May 2009	Angels & Demons	£6,054,627	Fighting (#6)	
21	24 May 2009	Night at the Museum: Battle of the Smithsonian	£4,160,496	Tormented (#8)	
22	31 May 2009	Night at the Museum: Battle of the Smithsonian	£2,054,769	Drag Me to Hell (#2), 12 Rounds (#5), Obsessed (#9), Jonas Brothers: The 3D Concert Experience (#10)	
23	7 June 2009	Terminator Salvation	£6,936,528	Last Chance Harvey (#6)	
24	14 June 2009	The Hangover	£3,193,806	The Last House on the Left (#7), Looking for Eric (#8)	
25	21 June 2009	Transformers: Revenge of the Fallen	£8,349,739		
26	28 June 2009	Transformers: Revenge of the Fallen	£4,368,024	Year One (#3), My Sister's Keeper (#4), Blood: The Last Vampire (#7), New York (#9), Sunshine Cleaning (#10)	
27	5 July 2009	Ice Age: Dawn of the Dinosaurs	£7,639,884	Public Enemies (#2), Kambakkht Ishq (#6)	
28	12 July 2009	Brüno	£5,000,229	Short Kut: The Con is On (#10)	
29	19 July 2009	Harry Potter and the Half-Blood Prince †	£19,784,924	Moon (#8)	
30	26 July 2009	Harry Potter and the Half-Blood Prince †	£5,176,950	The Proposal (#2), Antichrist (#10)	
31	2 August 2009	Harry Potter and the Half-Blood Prince †	£2,917,786	G-Force (#2), The Taking of Pelham 123 (#3), Land of the Lost (#6), Coco Before Chanel (#9), Love Aaj Kal (#10)	
32	9 August 2009	The Ugly Truth	£1,976,043	G.I. Joe: The Rise of Cobra (#2), Orphan (#8)	
33	16 August 2009	The Time Traveller's Wife	£1,410,333	Aliens in the Attic (#2), Bandslam (#7), A Perfect Getaway (#10)	
34	23 August 2009	Inglourious Basterds	£3,596,415	Dance Flick (#6)	
35	30 August 2009	The Final Destination	£3,633,395	Funny People (#3), The Hurt Locker (#8), Broken Embraces (#10)	
36	6 September 2009	District 9	£2,288,378	500 Days of Summer (#3)	
37	13 September 2009	District 9	£1,184,392	Dorian Gray (#3), Sorority Row (#4), Julie & Julia (#6), Adventureland (#10)	
38	20 September 2009	Cloudy with a Chance of Meatballs	£1,583,544	Gamer (#3), The Firm (#9), Away We Go (#10)	
39	27 September 2009	Fame	£2,408,242	Surrogates (#3), The Soloist (#5), Creation (#7)	
40	4 October 2009	Fame	£1,786,358	The Invention of Lying (#2), Toy Story 3D (#3), Pandorum (#7)	
41	11 October 2009	Up	£6,411,836	Zombieland (#2), Love Happen (#5), Halloween II (#6)	
42	18 October 2009	Up	£5,162,325	Couples Retreat (#2), The Imaginarium of Doctor Parnassus (#3), Triangle (#7), Blue (#10)	
43	25 October 2009	Up	£3,807,003	Saw VI (#2), Fantastic Mr. Fox (#3), Cirque Du Freak: The Vampires Assistant (#5)	
44	1 November 2009	Michael Jackson's This Is It	£4,877,255	9 (#7), An Education (#8), Dead Man Running (#10)	
45	8 November 2009	A Christmas Carol	£1,917,539	The Men Who Stare at Goats (#4), The Fourth Kind (#5), Jennifer's Body (#7)	
46	15 November 2009	2012	£6,489,809	Harry Brown (#3)	
47	22 November 2009	The Twilight Saga: New Moon	£11,683,158	A Serious Man (#8), The Informant! (#10)	
48	29 November 2009	The Twilight Saga: New Moon	£4,303,257	Paranormal Activity (#2), Law Abiding Citizen (#5), Nativity! (#6), De Dana Dan (#9)	
49	6 December 2009	Paranormal Activity	£1,839,273	Planet 51 (#4), The Box (#8), The Descent Part 2 (#9)	
50	13 December 2009	A Christmas Carol	£1,544,226	Where the Wild Things Are (#2)	
51	20 December 2009	Avatar	£8,509,050	St Trinian's 2: The Legend of Fritton's Gold (#2)	
52	27 December 2009	Alvin and the Chipmunks: The Squeakquel	£5,347,191	Sherlock Holmes (#3), 3 Idiots (#4), Nowhere Boy (#7)	

== See also ==
- British films of 2009
- List of number-one DVDs of 2009 (UK)

Preceded by 2008	2009	Succeeded by 2010
