= List of British films of 2009 =

A list of British films released in 2009.

Title	Director	Cast	Genre	Release date	Notes
44 Inch Chest	Malcolm Venville	Ray Winstone, Ian McShane, John Hurt, Tom Wilkinson	Gangster drama	15 January	
Awaydays	Pat Holden	Stephen Graham	Drama	22 May	
The Boat That Rocked	Richard Curtis	Bill Nighy, Philip Seymour Hoffman, Emma Thompson, Rhys Ifans	Period comedy	1 April	
Boogie Woogie	Duncan Ward	Amanda Seyfried, Gillian Anderson, Alan Cumming, Heather Graham	Comedy	2 May	
A Boy Called Dad	Brian Percival	Kyle Ward, Louise Delamere	Drama	30 April	
The Boys Are Back	Scott Hicks	Clive Owen, Emma Booth	Drama	15 September	Co-production with Australia
Bright Star	Jane Campion	Ben Whishaw, Abbie Cornish, Thomas Sangster	Romance	6 November	
Bronson	Nicolas Winding Refn	Tom Hardy	Gangster drama	13 March	
Bunny and the Bull	Paul King	Edward Hogg, Simon Farnaby	Comedy	27 November	
Cherrybomb	Lisa Barros D'Sa and Glenn Leyburn	Rupert Grint, Robert Sheehan	Drama	23 April	
City Rats	Steve M. Kelly	Danny Dyer, Tamer Hassan, Ray Panthaki, Susan Lynch	Black comedy	24 April	
Clubbed	Neil Thompson	Colin Salmon, Mel Raido, Shaun Parkes, Scot Williams, Maxine Peake	Drama	16 January	
Cracks	Jordan Scott	Eva Green, Juno Temple	Period drama	4 December	
Creation	Jon Amiel	Paul Bettany, Jennifer Connelly, Benedict Cumberbatch	Drama/biographical	25 September	
The Damned United	Tom Hooper	Michael Sheen, Jim Broadbent, Colm Meaney	Drama	25 March	
Desert Flower	Sherry Horman	Liya Kebede, Sally Hawkins	Biopic	5 September	Co-production with Germany
Doghouse	Jake West	Danny Dyer, Stephen Graham, Lee Ingleby, Terry Stone, Noel Clarke	Comedy	12 June	
Dorian Gray	Oliver Parker	Ben Barnes, Colin Firth, Rebecca Hall	Drama	11 September	
An Education	Lone Scherfig	Carey Mulligan, Emma Thompson, Sally Hawkins, Dominic Cooper	Coming-of-age	30 October	Academy Award nominated for Best Film; BAFTA winner for Best Actress
Endgame	Pete Travis	William Hurt, Chiwetel Ejiofor, Jonny Lee Miller	Drama	15 January	
An Englishman in New York	Richard Laxton	John Hurt, Cynthia Nixon, Jonathan Tucker	Drama/biographical	December	Screened on ITV1 in December
Exam	Stuart Hazeldine	Colin Salmon, Jimi Mistry, Gemma Chan	Psychological thriller	8 January	
The Firm	Nick Love	Paul Anderson, Calum McNab, Daniel Mays	Crime drama	18 September	Remake of 1989 TV film
Fish Tank	Andrea Arnold	Michael Fassbender	Drama	13 May	Winner of the Jury Prize at the 2009 Cannes Film Festival
Frequently Asked Questions About Time Travel	Gareth Carrivick	Anna Faris, Chris O'Dowd, Marc Wootton, Dean Lennox Kelly	Comedy sci-fi	24 April	
From Time to Time	Julian Fellowes	Alex Etel, Timothy Spall	Fantasy	15 October	
Glorious 39	Stephen Poliakoff	Romola Garai, Eddie Redmayne	Drama	20 November	
Harry Brown	Daniel Barber	Michael Caine, Ben Drew	Crime thriller	11 November	Premiered at the 2009 Toronto Film Festival
Harry Potter and the Half-Blood Prince	David Yates	Daniel Radcliffe, Emma Watson, Rupert Grint, Alan Rickman	Fantasy adventure	17 July	
Heartless	Philip Ridley	Jim Sturgess, Noel Clarke, Clémence Poésy	Fantasy		
Hippie Hippie Shake	Beeban Kidron	Cillian Murphy, Sienna Miller, Sean Biggerstaff, Emma Booth	Comedy drama		
I Know You Know	Justin Kerrigan	Robert Carlyle, Arron Fuller, Karl Johnson, Howard Marks	Drama	TBA	
The Imaginarium of Doctor Parnassus	Terry Gilliam	Heath Ledger, Jude Law, Colin Farrell, Johnny Depp	Fantasy	16 October	
In the Loop	Armando Iannucci	Tom Hollander, James Gandolfini, Chris Addison, Gina McKee	Comedy	17 April	Academy Award nomination for Best Adapted Screenplay
Iron Cross	Joshua Newton	Roy Scheider, Scott Cohen, Helmut Berger, Monica Cruz	Thriller	19 November 2010	
Is Anybody There?	John Crowley	Michael Caine, David Morrissey, Anne-Marie Duff, Bill Milner	Drama	1 May	
Jack Said	Michael Tchoubouroff	David O'Hara, Danny Dyer, Simon Phillips	Film noir	25 September	
Jackboots on Whitehall	Edward McHenry	Ewan McGregor, Rosamund Pike, Tom Wilkinson	Comedy	8 October	Animated movie with dolls
Knife Edge	Anthony Hickox	Hugh Bonneville, Natalie Press	Thriller		
Knowing	Alex Proyas	Nicolas Cage, Rose Byrne, Chandler Canterbury	Science fiction	20 March	
The Last Station	Michael Hoffman	Christopher Plummer, Helen Mirren, James McAvoy	Biopic	23 December	Co-produced with Germany and Russia
Lesbian Vampire Killers	Phil Claydon	James Corden, Mathew Horne	Comedy	20 March	
Little Ashes	Paul Morrison	Javier Beltrán, Robert Pattinson, Matthew McNulty	Drama/biographical	8 May	
London River	Rachid Bouchareb	Brenda Blethyn, Sotigui Kouyaté	Drama	10 February	
Looking for Eric	Ken Loach	Matthew McNulty	Drama/biographical	12 June	Screened in Competition at the Cannes Film Festival
The Lovely Bones	Peter Jackson	Mark Wahlberg, Rachel Weisz, Susan Sarandon, Stanley Tucci, Michael Imperioli, Saoirse Ronan	Supernatural thriller drama	24 November	
Malice in Wonderland	Simon Fellows	Maggie Grace, Danny Dyer	Fantasy		
The Magnificent Tati	Michael House	Jacques Tati, Frank Black, Sylvain Chomet	Documentary	26, November	Co-production with Finland
Moon	Duncan Jones	Sam Rockwell	Sci-fi	17 July	
My Last Five Girlfriends	Julian Kemp	Brendan Patricks, Naomie Harris	Comedy	19 March	
Nativity!	Debbie Isitt	Martin Freeman, Ashley Jensen, Jason Watkins, Marc Wootton	Comedy	27 November	
Nowhere Boy	Sam Taylor-Wood	Aaron Johnson	Drama	26 December	Drama about the boyhood of John Lennon; closing night world premiere at London Film Festival
Perrier's Bounty	Ian Fitzgibbon	Cillian Murphy, Jim Broadbent, Brendan Gleeson	Thriller comedy	26 March 2010	
Planet 51	Jorge Blanco	Dwayne Johnson, Jessica Biel, Gary Oldman	Animation	20 November	
Pope Joan	Sönke Wortmann	Johanna Wokalek, David Wenham	Historical drama	22 October	Co-production with Germany, Italy and Spain
Princess Kaiulani	Marc Forby	Q'orianka Kilcher, Barry Pepper	Biopic	7 February	Co-production with the US
Rage	Sally Potter	Jude Law, Judi Dench, Steve Buscemi	Drama	30 February	First shown at the Berlin International Film Festival
Rocketmen	Richard Dale		Documentary	30 August	
The Soloist	Joe Wright	Jamie Foxx, Robert Downey Jr., Catherine Keener, Tom Hollander, LisaGay Hamilton	Drama	20 April	
St. Trinian's II: The Legend of Fritton's Gold	Oliver Parker and Barnaby Thompson	Rupert Everett, Colin Firth, David Tennant, Talulah Riley, Sarah Harding, Gemma Arterton	Comedy	18 December	
The Secret of Moonacre	Gábor Csupó	Dakota Blue Richards, Tim Curry, Ioan Gruffudd	Adventure fantasy	12 February	
Sherlock Holmes	Guy Ritchie	Robert Downey Jr., Jude Law, Rachel McAdams	Adventure	25 December	
Shifty	Eran Creevy	Riz Ahmed, Daniel Mays, Jason Flemyng, Nitin Ganatra, Francesca Annis	Urban thriller	26 April	
Telstar	Nick Moran	Con O'Neill, Carl Barât, Kevin Spacey, Pam Ferris, Mathew Baynton	Drama	19 June	
Tony	Gerard Johnson	Peter Ferdinando, Ricky Grover, Neil Maskell	Horror	18 June	
Tormented	Jon Wright	Alex Pettyfer, April Pearson, Calvin Dean	Horror	22 May	
Triangle	Christopher Smith	Melissa George, Liam Hemsworth, Rachael Carpani	Horror	16 October	
The Young Victoria	Jean-Marc Vallée	Emily Blunt, Jim Broadbent, Rupert Friend, Miranda Richardson	Drama	6 March	Won the Academy Award for Best Costume Design

== See also ==
- 2009 in film
- 2009 in British music
- 2009 in British radio
- 2009 in British television
- 2009 in the United Kingdom
- List of 2009 box office number-one films in the United Kingdom
