= List of 2010 box office number-one films in the United Kingdom =

This is a list of films which have placed number one at the weekend box office in the United Kingdom during 2010.

== Films ==
†	This implies the highest-grossing movie of the year.

Week	Weekend End Date	Film	Total weekend gross (Pound sterling)	Weekend openings in the Top 10	Reference(s)
1	3 January 2010	Avatar (Note: Opened in 2009) †	£5,940,479	Did You Hear About the Morgans? (#4)	
2	10 January 2010	Avatar †	£4,770,980	Daybreakers (#3), It's Complicated (#5), The Road (#6), Sex & Drugs & Rock & Roll (#10)	
3	17 January 2010	Avatar †	£5,527,039	Up in the Air (#5), The Book of Eli (#6)	
4	24 January 2010	Avatar †	£5,155,844	Toy Story 2 3D (#6), Brothers (#9), A Prophet (#10)	
5	31 January 2010	Avatar †	£4,865,081	Edge of Darkness (#3), Precious: Based on the Novel 'Push' by Sapphire (#9)	
6	7 February 2010	Avatar †	£4,338,774	The Princess and the Frog (#2), Astro Boy (#3), Invictus (#4), Youth in Revolt (#7)	
7	14 February 2010	Valentine's Day	£3,732,393	The Wolfman (#3), Percy Jackson & the Olympians: The Lightning Thief (#5), My Name is Khan (#6), A Single Man (#8)	
8	21 February 2010	Avatar †	£2,817,009	The Lovely Bones (#3), Solomon Kane (#7)	
9	28 February 2010	Avatar †	£2,260,319	The Crazies (#3), Leap Year (#7), From Paris with Love (#8)	
10	7 March 2010	Alice in Wonderland	£10,555,220		
11	14 March 2010	Alice in Wonderland	£7,343,506	Shutter Island (#2), Green Zone (#3), Hachi: A Dog's Tale (#5), The Girl with the Dragon Tattoo (#6)	
12	21 March 2010	Alice in Wonderland	£4,847,129	The Bounty Hunter (#2), I Love You Phillip Morris (#4), The Spy Next Door (#6)	
13	28 March 2010	Nanny McPhee and the Big Bang	£2,586,760	The Blind Side (#3), Shank (#9)	
14	4 April 2010	Clash of the Titans	£5,682,875	How to Train Your Dragon (#2), Kick-Ass (#3), Remember Me (#7)	
15	11 April 2010	Clash of the Titans	£2,441,682	Whip It (#8)	
16	18 April 2010	Dear John	£1,995,301	The Ghost Writer (#6), Cemetery Junction (#7)	
17	25 April 2010	Date Night	£1,272,405	It's a Wonderful Afterlife (#7), The Joneses (#10)	
18	2 May 2010	Iron Man 2	£7,664,732	The Last Song (#4), House Full (#10)	
19	9 May 2010	Iron Man 2	£3,214,776	Furry Vengeance (#2), A Nightmare on Elm Street (#3), Hot Tub Time Machine (#4), The Back-up Plan (#5), Four Lions (#6)	
20	16 May 2010	Robin Hood	£5,750,332		
21	23 May 2010	StreetDance 3D	£2,493,948	Prince of Persia: The Sands of Time (#2), Kites (#5), Bad Lieutenant: Port of Call New Orleans (#9)	
22	30 May 2010	Sex and the City 2	£6,142,718	Tooth Fairy (#5), Space Chimps 2: Zartog Strikes Back (#7), The Losers (#8)	
23	6 June 2010	Sex and the City 2	£2,473,043	Death at a Funeral (#4), 4.3.2.1 (#7), She's Out of My League (#8)	
24	13 June 2010	Sex and the City 2	£1,489,833	Letters to Juliet (#2), Brooklyn's Finest (#5)	
25	20 June 2010	Killers	£1,053,074	Wild Target (#7)	
26	27 June 2010	Get Him to the Greek	£1,569,556	The Collector (#7)	
27	4 July 2010	Shrek Forever After	£8,955,554	I Hate Luv Storys (#5), Heartbreaker (#6)	
28	11 July 2010	The Twilight Saga: Eclipse	£13,756,653	Predators (#3), Milenge Milenge (#10)	
29	18 July 2010	Inception	£5,912,814	Leaving (#9), The Concert (#10)	
30	25 July 2010	Toy Story 3	£21,187,264	The Rebound (#5), Khatta Meetha (#7), Splice (#9),	
31	1 August 2010	Toy Story 3	£8,115,193	The Karate Kid (#2), The A-Team (#3), Gainsbourg (#8), Once Upon a Time in Mumbaai (#8)	
32	8 August 2010	Toy Story 3	£4,666,021	Knight and Day (#2), Step Up 3D (#4), Cats & Dogs: The Revenge of Kitty Galore (#5)	
33	15 August 2010	Toy Story 3	£3,162,944	The Last Airbender (#3), The Sorcerer's Apprentice (#5), Tinker Bell and the Great Fairy Rescue (#10)	
34	22 August 2010	The Expendables	£3,910,596	Salt (#2), Piranha 3D (#4), Marmaduke (#5)	
35	29 August 2010	Grown Ups	£2,006,945	Scott Pilgrim vs. the World (#2), Diary of a Wimpy Kid (#8)	
36	5 September 2010	The Last Exorcism	£1,104,856	Dinner for Schmucks (#2), The Switch (#6)	
37	12 September 2010	Resident Evil: Afterlife	£1,690,655	Tamara Drewe (#5), Going the Distance (#7), Cyrus (#8)	
38	19 September 2010	The Other Guys	£1,980,601	Devil (#2)	
39	26 September 2010	The Other Guys	£1,292,144	Eat Pray Love (#2), The Town (#3), The Hole (#4)	
40	3 October 2010	The Other Guys	£976,459	Buried (#3), Made in Dagenham (#6), Back to the Future (#7)	
41	10 October 2010	Wall Street: Money Never Sleeps	£1,784,309	Life as We Know It (#2), The Death and Life of Charlie St. Cloud (#3)	
42	17 October 2010	Despicable Me	£3,664,376	The Social Network (#2), Vampires Suck (#3)	
43	24 October 2010	Paranormal Activity 2	£3,764,722	Red (#3), Legend of the Guardians: The Owls of Ga'Hoole (#5), Alpha and Omega (#5), Easy A (#8)	
44	31 October 2010	Saw 3D	£3,600,083	Burke & Hare (#6), The Kids Are All Right (#9)	
45	7 November 2010	Due Date	£2,346,089	Jackass 3D (#2), Let Me In (#8), Another Year (#9)	
46	14 November 2010	Due Date	£1,898,324	Skyline (#2)	
47	21 November 2010	Harry Potter and the Deathly Hallows – Part 1	£18,319,721	Guzaarish (#8)	
48	28 November 2010	Harry Potter and the Deathly Hallows – Part 1	£8,344,776	Unstoppable (#2), London Boulevard (#3), The American (#5), The Girl Who Kicked the Hornet's Nest (#7), Machete (#10)	
49	5 December 2010	Harry Potter and the Deathly Hallows – Part 1	£3,739,781	Megamind (#2), Monsters (#5), The Warrior's Way (#10)	
50	12 December 2010	The Chronicles of Narnia: The Voyage of the Dawn Treader	£2,460,118	The Tourist (#3), Somewhere (#8), No Problem (#9)	
51	19 December 2010	Tron: Legacy	£1,970,692	Burlesque (#6), Animals United (#7), Fred: The Movie (#8)	
52	26 December 2010	Little Fockers	£3,035,717	Tees Maar Khan (#5), Arthur and the Great Adventure (#9)	

== See also ==
- List of British films of 2010

Preceded by 2009	2010	Succeeded by 2011
