= List of 2004 box office number-one films in the United Kingdom =

This is a list of films which have placed number one at the weekend box office in the United Kingdom during 2004.

== Number-one films ==
| † | This implies the highest-grossing movie of the year. |

| # | Weekend End Date | Film | Total Weekend Gross | Notes |
|---|---|---|---|---|
| 1 | January 4, 2004 | The Lord of the Rings: The Return of the King | £6,496,723 | |
| 2 | January 11, 2004 | The Lord of the Rings: The Return of the King | £3,713,999 | |
| 3 | January 18, 2004 | The Lord of the Rings: The Return of the King | £2,377,268 | |
| 4 | January 25, 2004 | Scary Movie 3 | £3,490,585 | |
| 5 | February 1, 2004 | Scary Movie 3 | £1,894,077 | |
| 6 | February 8, 2004 | School of Rock | £2,742,356 | |
| 7 | February 15, 2004 | Cheaper by the Dozen | £1,817,148 | |
| 8 | February 22, 2004 | The Haunted Mansion | £1,564,558 | |
| 9 | February 29, 2004 | Along Came Polly | £2,252,808 | |
| 10 | March 7, 2004 | Along Came Polly | £1,572,126 | |
| 11 | March 14, 2004 | Mona Lisa Smile | £1,190,923 | |
| 12 | March 21, 2004 | Starsky & Hutch | £4,145,897 | |
| 13 | March 28, 2004 | The Passion of the Christ | £2,019,935 | |
| 14 | April 4, 2004 | Scooby-Doo 2: Monsters Unleashed | £3,549,487 | |
| 15 | April 11, 2004 | Scooby-Doo 2: Monsters Unleashed | £2,038,602 | |
| 16 | April 18, 2004 | Scooby-Doo 2: Monsters Unleashed | £1,772,130 | |
| 17 | April 25, 2004 | Kill Bill: Volume 2 | £2,768,832 | |
| 18 | May 2, 2004 | Kill Bill: Volume 2 | £1,456,152 | |
| 19 | May 9, 2004 | Van Helsing | £5,429,632 | |
| 20 | May 16, 2004 | Van Helsing | £2,403,036 | |
| 21 | May 23, 2004 | Troy | £6,017,523 | |
| 22 | May 30, 2004 | The Day After Tomorrow | £7,321,633 | |
| 23 | June 6, 2004 | Harry Potter and the Prisoner of Azkaban | £23,882,688 | |
| 24 | June 13, 2004 | Harry Potter and the Prisoner of Azkaban | £4,391,262 | |
| 25 | June 20, 2004 | Harry Potter and the Prisoner of Azkaban | £3,374,330 | |
| 26 | June 27, 2004 | Harry Potter and the Prisoner of Azkaban | £2,029,289 | |
| 27 | July 4, 2004 | Shrek 2 † | £16,220,752 | |
| 28 | July 11, 2004 | Shrek 2 † | £7,097,154 | |
| 29 | July 18, 2004 | Spider-Man 2 | £8,766,902 | |
| 30 | July 25, 2004 | Spider-Man 2 | £3,590,463 | |
| 31 | August 1, 2004 | King Arthur | £1,908,084 | |
| 32 | August 8, 2004 | I, Robot | £4,745,541 | |
| 33 | August 15, 2004 | The Bourne Supremacy | £2,720,016 | |
| 34 | August 22, 2004 | The Village | £2,945,763 | |
| 35 | August 29, 2004 | Dodgeball: A True Underdog Story | £2,200,271 | |
| 36 | September 5, 2004 | The Terminal | £1,451,168 | |
| 37 | September 12, 2004 | Open Water | £1,970,176 | |
| 38 | September 19, 2004 | Collateral | £2,238,200 | |
| 39 | September 26, 2004 | Wimbledon | £1,699,096 | |
| 40 | October 3, 2004 | Wimbledon | £1,499,011 | |
| 41 | October 10, 2004 | Bride and Prejudice | £1,667,616 | |
| 42 | October 17, 2004 | Shark Tale | £7,545,074 | |
| 43 | October 24, 2004 | Shark Tale | £3,199,963 | |
| 44 | October 31, 2004 | Shark Tale | £2,435,188 | |
| 45 | November 7, 2004 | The Grudge | £2,261,710 | |
| 46 | November 14, 2004 | Bridget Jones: The Edge of Reason | £10,435,193 | |
| 47 | November 21, 2004 | Bridget Jones: The Edge of Reason | £5,047,315 | |
| 48 | November 28, 2004 | The Incredibles | £9,753,035 | |
| 49 | December 5, 2004 | The Incredibles | £4,187,280 | |
| 50 | December 12, 2004 | Blade: Trinity | £2,633,626 | |
| 51 | December 19, 2004 | Lemony Snicket's A Series of Unfortunate Events | £2,210,979 | |
| 52 | December 26, 2004 | The Polar Express | £688,859 | |

== See also ==
- List of British films — British films by year

| Preceded by 2003 | 2004 | Succeeded by 2005 |
