= Heritage film =

Period films with high-quality visual production values

Heritage film is a term used to refer to a genre of British historical films which are argued to depict pre-World War II Britain in a nostalgic and sentimental fashion. The term was coined by 20th-century writers on the British left, and although originally used in a critical manner has now broadened out to a more neutral descriptor. It has also been used to describe historical films with high-quality production values produced in Europe and beyond.

Many heritage films were adapted from British classic literature of the 19th and early 20th centuries. Heritage films have been argued to have a particular aesthetic approach (the "heritage" or "museum" aesthetic), marked by scrupulous attention to historical detail and the prominent depiction of the English countryside. The genre began during the second half of the 20th century, coinciding with the British heritage industry's rise to prominence since the 1970s. Critics have argued that the emergence of the heritage film was influenced by successive Conservative Party ministries under Prime Minister Margaret Thatcher, which promoted a notion of the UK's cultural heritage which was politically conservative, pro–free enterprise and biased towards upper class values.

At a time of British industrial decline, stagnant economic growth, political polarisation and social unrest, heritage films were appealing to many because they projected a nostalgic image of Britain as a prosperous, powerful and socially cohesive nation. Many heritage films were set in the British Empire, particularly in India. While these films have been described as glorifying and romanticising the past, they have also been argued to contain critiques of British society. Other critics point out that the representations, themes and perspectives presented in heritage films are varied, not homogeneous, and many of them are romance narratives, suggesting that the pleasures they offer to audiences are more diverse and less necessarily conservative than those assumed by their original critics.

== Critical debate ==
The heritage film has been criticised from a socialist perspective for its romanticised portrayal of the past, its emphasis on the bourgeoisie or aristocracy rather than working class, and its fascination with luxurious settings, clothing, and lifestyles. Its critics argued that the films reduced the past to a lavish consumer experience, presenting it as spectacle rather than offering audiences historical or critical understanding. This argument was strongly coloured by the wider, politicised and polarised, debates around British film, culture and society taking place in the Thatcher era, including similar critiques of the heritage industry itself, vehement opposition to Thatcherism among many British filmmakers and other prominent cultural figures, and counter-attacks on "anti-Thatcher" films (almost always, by contrast, set in present-day Britain) by Thatcher’s supporters in the British media.

A further important strand in the critical debate around heritage films argues – from a feminist and pro-LGBT position – that, in contrast with their conservative reputation, many of the films are strongly progressive in their gender and sexual politics. Many of the best-loved heritage films focus on strong and complex female characters (more than many other popular film genres), and some focus directly on the personal struggles, social position, rights of women and LGBT individuals in ways that remain relevant and deeply moving to their contemporary audiences. In short, although the heritage film became popular by providing an escape from the present – particularly in the divided social and political climate of 1980s Britain – the full picture of the films' appeal, politics, and personal value for their audiences is more complex.

Not all British films made since 1980 and set in the historic past are heritage films. The heritage film can be distinguished from period films that take a more self-conscious, less naturalistic, even anachronistic approach to screening narratives set in the past (the "post-heritage film"); and from those set in more recent decades (usually 1940s onwards) that focus on characters from ordinary or working class social backgrounds, biographical subjects (biopics) and/or popular culture (the "retro film" or "alternative heritage film").

== Cinema ==
- Chariots of Fire (1981)
- Another Country (1984)
- A Passage to India (1985)
- A Room with a View (1985)
- Maurice (1987)
- Little Dorrit (1987)
- A Handful of Dust (1988)
- A Summer Story (1988)
- Where Angels Fear to Tread (1991)
- Howards End (1992)
- Indochine (1992)
- Shadowlands (1993)
- The Remains of the Day (1993)
- The Madness of King George (1994)
- Sense and Sensibility (1995)
- Emma (1996)
- Elizabeth (1998)
- Shakespeare in Love (1998)
- Pride & Prejudice (2005)
- The King's Speech (2010)
