= Rocketmen (film) =

- Directed by: Richard Dale
- Produced by: Tim Goodchild; Michael Kemp; Peter Parnham
- Narrated by: Michael J. Reynolds
- Edited by: Peter Parnham
- Music by: Richard Blair-Oliphant
- Production company: Dangerous Films
- Distributed by: Sony Pictures Entertainment
- Release date: 21 August 2009; (Japan)
- Running time: 1 hour 32 minutes
- Country: United Kingdom
- Language: English

Rocketmen is a 2009 documentary directed and written by Richard Dale. The film is narrated by Michael J. Reynolds.

This was BBC Worldwide's first science film release and it grossed $1.2 million from being shown theatrically on 104 screens in Japan in 2009 (performing at number 16 nationally on its opening weekend), in addition to subsequent release on various international television outlets and on Netflix.

== Synopsis ==
Using archival footage, this film explores the American space program, from the Mercury program through Gemini program through the return to space after the Space Shuttle Columbia Disaster.
