= List of number-one DVDs of 2008 (UK) =

This is a list of The Official UK Charts Company DVDs of 2008. The biggest selling DVD of the year was Mamma Mia!

== Number ones ==
Issue Date	DVD
6 January	Rush Hour 3
13 January	300
20 January	Death Proof
27 January	Blue Harvest (Family Guy episode)
3 February	The Kingdom
10 February	Atonement
17 February	Ratatouille
24 February	Ratatouille
2 March	Stardust
9 March	101 Dalmatians - Animated
16 March	American Gangster
23 March	Beowulf
30 March	Beowulf
6 April	Hitman
13 April	Enchanted
20 April	Alvin and the Chipmunks
27 April	I Am Legend
4 May	The Golden Compass
11 May	The Golden Compass
18 May	Alien vs Predator - Requiem
25 May	Sweeney Todd: The Demon Barber of Fleet Street
1 June	The Bee Movie
8 June	National Treasure 2 - Book of Secrets
15 June	Cloverfield
22 June	Jumper
29 June	Rambo
6 July	The Bank Job
13 July	There Will Be Blood
20 July	Step Up 2: The Streets
27 July	10000 BC
3 August	27 Dresses
10 August	Vantage Point
17 August	In Bruges
24 August	Never Back Down
31 August	Nim's Island
7 September	Doomsday
14 September	What Happens in Vegas
21 September	Forgetting Sarah Marshall
28 September	Sex and the City - The Movie
5 October	Sex and the City - The Movie
12 October	Sex and the City - The Movie
19 October	The Incredible Hulk
26 October	Wanted
2 November	Iron Man
9 November	Iron Man
16 November	Indiana Jones and the Kingdom of the Crystal Skull
23 November	Kung Fu Panda
30 November	Mamma Mia!
7 December	Mamma Mia!
14 December	The Dark Knight
21 December	Mamma Mia!
28 December	Mamma Mia!

== See also ==
- UK DVD Chart
