= List of number-one DVDs of 2007 (UK) =

== Chart history ==
Issue date	Number-one DVD
Week 1	High School Musical
Week 2	Severance
Week 3	Children of Men
Week 4	Little Man
Week 5	Click
Week 6	The Devil Wears Prada
Week 7	The Devil Wears Prada
Week 8	The Departed
Week 9	Saw III
Week 10	Borat
Week 11	The Queen
Week 12	Casino Royale
Week 13	Happy Feet
Week 14	Night at the Museum
Week 15	Night at the Museum
Week 16	Eragon
23 April	Miss Potter
30 April	Miss Potter
7 May	Smokin' Aces
14 May	The Pursuit of Happyness
21 May	Rocky Balboa
28 May	Charlotte's Web
4 June	Music and Lyrics
11 June	Hot Fuzz
18 June	Hot Fuzz
25 June	Hannibal Rising
2 July	Ghost Rider
9 July	Outlaw
16 July	Premonition
23 July	Number 23
30 July	The Hills Have Eyes 2
6 August	Blades of Glory
13 August	Shooter
20 August	Mr. Bean's Holiday
27 August	Wild Hogs
3 September	This Is England
10 September	28 Weeks Later
17 September	28 Weeks Later
24 September	Next
1 October	300
8 October	Fantastic Four: Rise of the Silver Surfer
15 October	Spider-Man 3
22 October	Spider-Man 3
29 October	Die Hard 4.0
5 November	The Jungle Book
12 November	Harry Potter and the Order of the Phoenix
19 November	Pirates of the Caribbean: At World's End
26 November	Shrek the Third
