= Greatest Hits Live (Take That) =

2019 concert tour by Take That

- Tour by Take That
- Location: Europe
- Associated album: Odyssey
- Start date: 12 April 2019
- End date: 8 September 2019
- Legs: 1
- No. of shows: 53
- Supporting acts: Rick Astley; Brother Leo

Take That concert chronology
- Wonderland Live (2017); Greatest Hits Live (2019); This Life on Tour (2024)

Greatest Hits Live (also known as Odyssey Live) was the eleventh concert tour by the English band Take That, in support of their greatest hits album, Odyssey (2018). The tour began in Sheffield, England at FlyDSA Arena on 12 April 2019, and ended on 8 September 2019, in Gibraltar at Victoria Stadium, consisting of 53 shows.

== Set list ==
UK and Ireland leg

1. "Greatest Day"
2. "It Only Takes a Minute"
3. "These Days"
4. "Could It Be Magic"
5. "Everything Changes" (with Robbie Williams on screen)
6. "Travel Interlude"
7. "Out of Our Heads"
8. "A Million Love Songs"
9. "Sure"
10. "Love Ain't Here Anymore"
11. "Spin"
12. "Cry"
13. "Said It All"
14. "How Deep Is Your Love" (with Bee Gees on screen)
15. "Break Up Interlude"
16. "Let's Do It Again Interlude"
17. "Patience"
18. "The Flood"
19. "Back for Good"
20. "Get Ready for It"
21. "Everlasting"
22. "Giants"
23. "Shine"
24. "Never Forget" (with a local gospel choir)
25. "Relight My Fire" (with Lulu and a local gospel choir)
26. "Babe"
27. "Pray"
28. "Rule the World"

European leg

1. "Greatest Day"
2. "Shine"
3. "Get Ready for It"
4. "Giants"
5. "Patience"
6. "Pray"
7. "Everything Changes"
8. "It Only Takes a Minute"
9. "Could It Be Magic"
10. "Babe"
11. "A Million Love Songs"
12. "Back for Good"
13. "Out of Our Heads"
14. "Everlasting"
15. "These Days"
16. "The Flood"
17. "Cry"
18. "Relight My Fire
19. "Rule the World"
20. "Never Forget"

== Tour dates ==
List of concerts, showing date, city, country, venue, opening act, tickets sold, number of available tickets and amount of gross revenue
Date	City	Country	Venue	Opening acts	Attendance	Revenue
Europe
12 April 2019	Sheffield	England	FlyDSA Arena	Rick Astley	—	—
13 April 2019	Sheffield	England	FlyDSA Arena	Rick Astley	—	—
15 April 2019	Sheffield	England	FlyDSA Arena	Rick Astley	—	—
16 April 2019	Sheffield	England	FlyDSA Arena	Rick Astley	—	—
18 April 2019	Glasgow	Scotland	SSE Hydro	Rick Astley	32,549 / 32,562	$4,009,580
19 April 2019	Glasgow	Scotland	SSE Hydro	Rick Astley	32,549 / 32,562	$4,009,580
20 April 2019	Glasgow	Scotland	SSE Hydro	Rick Astley	32,549 / 32,562	$4,009,580
22 April 2019	Manchester	England	Manchester Arena	Rick Astley	71,659 / 72,532	$7,680,200
23 April 2019	Manchester	England	Manchester Arena	Rick Astley	71,659 / 72,532	$7,680,200
25 April 2019	Manchester	England	Manchester Arena	Rick Astley	71,659 / 72,532	$7,680,200
26 April 2019	Manchester	England	Manchester Arena	Rick Astley	71,659 / 72,532	$7,680,200
27 April 2019	Manchester	England	Manchester Arena	Rick Astley	71,659 / 72,532	$7,680,200
29 April 2019	Dublin	Ireland	3Arena	Rick Astley	—	—
30 April 2019	Dublin	Ireland	3Arena	Rick Astley	—	—
2 May 2019	London	England	The O_{2} Arena	Rick Astley	102,726 / 115,266	$11,636,500
3 May 2019	London	England	The O_{2} Arena	Rick Astley	102,726 / 115,266	$11,636,500
4 May 2019	London	England	The O_{2} Arena	Rick Astley	102,726 / 115,266	$11,636,500
5 May 2019	London	England	The O_{2} Arena	Rick Astley	102,726 / 115,266	$11,636,500
7 May 2019	London	England	The O_{2} Arena	Rick Astley	102,726 / 115,266	$11,636,500
8 May 2019	London	England	The O_{2} Arena	Rick Astley	102,726 / 115,266	$11,636,500
9 May 2019	London	England	The O_{2} Arena	Rick Astley	102,726 / 115,266	$11,636,500
10 May 2019	London	England	The O_{2} Arena	Rick Astley	102,726 / 115,266	$11,636,500
12 May 2019	Birmingham	England	Arena Birmingham	Rick Astley	—	—
13 May 2019	Birmingham	England	Arena Birmingham	Rick Astley	—	—
14 May 2019	Birmingham	England	Arena Birmingham	Rick Astley	—	—
16 May 2019	Birmingham	England	Arena Birmingham	Rick Astley	—	—
17 May 2019	Birmingham	England	Arena Birmingham	Rick Astley	—	—
18 May 2019	Birmingham	England	Arena Birmingham	Rick Astley	—	—
19 May 2019	Birmingham	England	Arena Birmingham	Rick Astley	—	—
23 May 2019	Milton Keynes	England	Stadium MK	Rick Astley	28,957 / 28,957	$2,971,072
25 May 2019	Southampton	England	St Mary's Stadium	Rick Astley	55,180 / 55,180	$5,485,322
26 May 2019	Southampton	England	St Mary's Stadium	Rick Astley	55,180 / 55,180	$5,485,322
28 May 2019	Bristol	England	Ashton Gate Stadium	Rick Astley	28,727 / 28,727	$3,035,051
30 May 2019	Norwich	England	Carrow Road	Rick Astley	24,842 / 24,842	$2,547,174
1 June 2019	Middlesbrough	England	Riverside Stadium	Rick Astley	30,259 / 30,259	$3,011,690
4 June 2019	Huddersfield	England	Kirklees Stadium	Rick Astley	—	—
6 June 2019	Liverpool	England	Anfield	Rick Astley	33,125 / 36,005	$3,156,366
8 June 2019	Cardiff	Wales	Principality Stadium	Rick Astley	—	—
13 June 2019	Paris	France	Le Grand Rex	Brother Leo	—	—
14 June 2019	Brussels	Belgium	Palais 12	Brother Leo	—	—
15 June 2019	Düsseldorf	Germany	Mitsubishi Electric Halle	Brother Leo	—	—
17 June 2019	Amsterdam	Netherlands	AFAS Live	Brother Leo	—	—
18 June 2019	Ostend	Belgium	Kursaal	Brother Leo	—	—
20 June 2019	Berlin	Germany	Tempodrom	Brother Leo	—	—
21 June 2019	Copenhagen	Denmark	K.B. Hallen	Brother Leo	—	—
22 June 2019	Copenhagen	Denmark	K.B. Hallen	Brother Leo	—	—
24 June 2019	Hamburg	Germany	Stadtpark	Brother Leo	—	—
25 June 2019	Frankfurt	Germany	Jahrhunderthalle	Brother Leo	—	—
26 June 2019	Vienna	Austria	Stadthalle Hall F	Brother Leo	—	—
28 June 2019	Lucca	Italy	Piazza Napoleone	Brother Leo	—	—
29 June 2019	Rome	Italy	Parco della Musica	Brother Leo	—	—
30 June 2019	Zürich	Switzerland	Hallenstadion	Brother Leo	—	—
8 September 2019	Gibraltar		Victoria Stadium	—	—	—
Total					—	—

== Odyssey: Greatest Hits Live ==
Take That broadcast their Cardiff Principality Stadium show live in cinemas on 8 June. Odyssey: Greatest Hits Live was released as a limited edition DVD/CD and Blu-ray on 15 November 2019.
