= Wonderland Live =

2017 concert tour by Take That

- Tour by Take That
- Location: Asia; Europe; Oceania
- Associated album: Wonderland
- Start date: 5 May 2017
- End date: 29 November 2017
- Legs: 2
- No. of shows: 38
- Supporting acts: All Saints; Dannii Minogue

Take That concert chronology
- Take That Live (2015); Wonderland Live (2017); Greatest Hits Live (2019)

Wonderland Live was the tenth concert tour by the English pop group Take That in support of their eighth studio album, Wonderland (2017). The tour and album was announced on 22 October 2016 during The X Factor with All Saints to support. Nine additional dates were added due to high demand having sold out 27 of 32 dates. The tour was confirmed to be the first Take That concert in the round.

On 7 April 2017, it was announced the tour would visit Australia, the band's first visit in 22 years, supported by Dannii Minogue. Shows were later announced in New Zealand, Israel and Dubai.

The first leg of the tour began at the Genting Arena in Birmingham on 5 May 2017, and concluded at the Etihad Stadium in Manchester on 18 June 2017. The second leg began at Perth Arena in Perth on 11 November 2017, and concluded at Dubai Media City Amphitheatre on 29 November 2017.

== Opening acts ==
- All Saints (UK and Ireland dates)
- Dannii Minogue (Australia & New Zealand dates)

== Set list ==
This set list is representative of the first show in Birmingham, performed on 5 May 2017.

1. "Wonderland"
2. "Greatest Day"
3. "Get Ready For It"
4. "Giants"
5. "Kidz"
6. "Underground Machine"
7. "Relight My Fire"
8. "Superstar"
9. "Hope"
10. "Acoustic Medley"(with elements of "Beautiful World", "Wait", "Satisfield", "Lovelife", and "How Deep Is Your Love")
11. "New Day"
12. "Shine"
13. "Back for Good"
14. "Patience"
15. "Pray"
16. "It's All For You"
17. "The Flood"
18. "Cry"
19. "These Days"
  Encore
20. "Never Forget"
21. "Rule the World"

== Tour dates ==
List of 2017 concerts, showing date, city, country, and venue
Date	City	Country	Venue
5 May 2017	Birmingham	England	Genting Arena
6 May 2017	Birmingham	England	Genting Arena
8 May 2017	Newcastle	England	Metro Radio Arena
9 May 2017	Newcastle	England	Metro Radio Arena
11 May 2017	Glasgow	Scotland	SSE Hydro
12 May 2017	Glasgow	Scotland	SSE Hydro
13 May 2017	Glasgow	Scotland	SSE Hydro
15 May 2017	Dublin	Ireland	3Arena
16 May 2017	Dublin	Ireland	3Arena
18 May 2017	Manchester	England	Manchester Arena
19 May 2017	Manchester	England	Manchester Arena
20 May 2017	Manchester	England	Manchester Arena
22 May 2017	Liverpool	England	Echo Arena
26 May 2017	Liverpool	England	Echo Arena
29 May 2017	Sheffield	England	Sheffield Arena
30 May 2017	Sheffield	England	Sheffield Arena
1 June 2017	Birmingham	England	Genting Arena
2 June 2017	Birmingham	England	Genting Arena
3 June 2017	Birmingham	England	Genting Arena
4 June 2017	Birmingham	England	Genting Arena
6 June 2017	London	England	The O_{2} Arena
7 June 2017	London	England	The O_{2} Arena
9 June 2017	London	England	The O_{2} Arena
10 June 2017	London	England	The O_{2} Arena
11 June 2017	London	England	The O_{2} Arena
12 June 2017	London	England	The O_{2} Arena
14 June 2017	Swansea	Wales	Liberty Stadium
15 June 2017	Norwich	England	Carrow Road Stadium
16 June 2017	Norwich	England	Carrow Road Stadium
18 June 2017	Manchester	England	Etihad Stadium
11 November 2017	Perth	Australia	Perth Arena
13 November 2017	Adelaide	Australia	Adelaide Entertainment Centre
15 November 2017	Melbourne	Australia	Rod Laver Arena
17 November 2017	Sydney	Australia	Qudos Bank Arena
18 November 2017	Brisbane	Australia	Brisbane Entertainment Centre
21 November 2017	Wellington	New Zealand	TSB Bank Arena
22 November 2017	Auckland	New Zealand	The Trusts Arena
27 November 2017	Tel Aviv	Israel	Menora Mivtachim Arena
29 November 2017	Dubai	United Arab Emirates	Dubai Media City Amphitheatre

== Rescheduled shows ==
List of 2017 concerts, showing date, city, country, and venue
Original date	Rescheduled date	City	Country	Venue	Rescheduled Venue	Reason	Ref.
23 May 2017	26 May 2017	Liverpool	England	Echo Arena		Manchester Arena bombing	
25 May 2017	18 June 2017	Manchester	England	Manchester Arena	Etihad Stadium	Manchester Arena bombing	
26 May 2017	18 June 2017	Manchester	England	Manchester Arena	Etihad Stadium	Manchester Arena bombing	
27 May 2017	18 June 2017	Manchester	England	Manchester Arena	Etihad Stadium	Manchester Arena bombing	
30 November 2017	29 November 2017	Dubai	United Arab Emirates	Dubai Media City Amphitheatre		Birth of Prophet Mohammed	

== Cancelled shows ==
List of cancelled concerts, showing date, city, country, venue and reason
Date	City	Country	Venue	Reason	Ref.
19 November 2017	Newcastle	Australia	Newcastle Entertainment Centre	Poor ticket sales	

== Cinema & TV release ==
On 20 April 2017, it was announced the show on 9 June 2017 at London's O2 Arena would be broadcast live to 500 cinemas around the UK & Ireland. The filmed concert was later screened on Sky One over Christmas 2017.
