= List of 2017 box office number-one films in the United Kingdom =

The following films placed number one at the weekend box office in the United Kingdom during 2017.

== Films ==
Week	Weekend end date	Film	Total weekend gross (pound sterling)	Top 10 opening	Reference(s)
1	1 January 2017	Rogue One: A Star Wars Story	£5,959,299	Why Him? (#2), Monster Trucks (#4), Collateral Beauty (#7)	
2	8 January 2017	Assassin's Creed	£5,389,680	Silence (#3), A Monster Calls (#7)	
3	15 January 2017	La La Land	£6,596,256	Manchester by the Sea (#6), Live by Night (#7), The Bye Bye Man (#9)	
4	22 January 2017	La La Land	£4,373,249	Split (#2), XXX: Return of Xander Cage (#3), Lion (#4), Jackie (#6)	
5	29 January 2017	Sing	£10,487,380	T2 Trainspotting (#2), Hacksaw Ridge (#5), Raees (#7)	
6	5 February 2017	Sing	£3,800,408	Rings (#7), Resident Evil: The Final Chapter (#8), Gold (#9)	
7	12 February 2017	The Lego Batman Movie	£7,906,468	Fifty Shades Darker (#2), The Space Between Us (#10)	
8	19 February 2017	The Lego Batman Movie	£4,435,521	John Wick: Chapter 2 (#3), The Great Wall (#5), Hidden Figures (#6), Moonlight (#10)	
9	26 February 2017	The Lego Batman Movie	£2,893,337	Patriots Day (#7), A Cure for Wellness (#10)	
10	5 March 2017	Logan	£9,443,363	Viceroy's House (#3), Fist Fight (#10)	
11	12 March 2017	Kong: Skull Island	£6,230,997	La Traviata – Met Opera (#9)	
12	19 March 2017	Beauty and the Beast	£19,700,000	Get Out (#3)	
13	26 March 2017	Beauty and the Beast	£12,334,338	Power Rangers (#2), Life (#6), The Lost City of Z (#7), CHiPs (#8), Idomeneo – Met Opera (#10)	
14	2 April 2017	Beauty and the Beast	£6,750,000	Ghost in the Shell (#2), Smurfs: The Lost Village (#3), Free Fire (#7), Peter Kay's Car Share: A Second Series Celebration (#10)	
15	9 April 2017	The Boss Baby	£8,025,886	Peppa Pig: My First Cinema Experience (#3), Going in Style (#6)	
16	16 April 2017	Fast & Furious 8	£14,026,301	The Handmaiden (#6), The Sense of an Ending (#10)	
17	23 April 2017	Fast & Furious 8	£3,593,733	Their Finest (#4), Eugene Onegin – Met Opera (#6), Unforgettable (#7)	
18	30 April 2017	Guardians of the Galaxy Vol. 2	£13,092,657	Baahubali 2: The Conclusion (Hindi) (#6), Baahubali 2: The Conclusion (Tamil) (#9), Lady Macbeth (#10)	
19	7 May 2017	Guardians of the Galaxy Vol. 2	£6,097,082	A Dog's Purpose (#2), Sleepless (#6), Mindhorn (#8), Unlocked (#9)	
20	14 May 2017	Alien: Covenant	£5,178,531	Der Rosenkavalier – Met Opera (#6), Miss Sloane (#8)	
21	21 May 2017	King Arthur: Legend of the Sword	£2,501,993	Snatched (#4), Colossal (#9), Half Girlfriend (#10)	
22	28 May 2017	Pirates of the Caribbean: Salazar's Revenge	£5,238,049	Diary of a Wimpy Kid: The Long Haul (#2), The Red Turtle (#9)	
23	4 June 2017	Wonder Woman	£6,179,616	Baywatch (#2)	
24	11 June 2017	Wonder Woman	£3,480,956	The Mummy (#2), Take That: Wonderland Live from the O2 (#5), My Cousin Rachel (#6)	
25	18 June 2017	Wonder Woman	£1,868,607	Churchill (#5), Gifted (#6), Whitney: Can I Be Me (#10)	
26	25 June 2017	Transformers: The Last Knight	£4,635,570	Hampstead (#6), Tubelight (#7)	
27	2 July 2017	Despicable Me 3	£11,154,904	Baby Driver (#2), All Eyez on Me (#4), The House (#6)	
28	9 July 2017	Spider-Man: Homecoming	£9,369,166	It Comes at Night (#7), Mom (#9)	
29	16 July 2017	War for the Planet of the Apes	£7,195,773	Cars 3 (#4), The Beguiled (#6), Jagga Jasoos (#8)	
30	23 July 2017	Dunkirk	£10,023,720	André Rieu’s 2017 Maastricht Concert (#6), The Black Prince (#9)	
31	30 July 2017	Dunkirk	£8,235,532	Captain Underpants: The First Epic Movie (#2), Girls Trip (#6), 47 Meters Down (#8), The Big Sick (#10)	
32	6 August 2017	Dunkirk	£4,624,570	The Emoji Movie (#2), Valerian and the City of a Thousand Planets (#3), Jab Harry Met Sejal (#10)	
33	13 August 2017	Dunkirk	£2,634,839	Annabelle: Creation (#2), Atomic Blonde (#3), The Nut Job 2: Nutty by Nature (#10)	
34	20 August 2017	The Hitman's Bodyguard	£1,982,951	The Dark Tower (#5), Everything, Everything (#9)	
35	27 August 2017	American Made	£1,067,075	Logan Lucky (#4), Detroit (#7)	
36	3 September 2017	American Made	£968,068	The Limehouse Golem (#9)	
37	10 September 2017	It	£10,002,443	Wind River (#6)	
38	17 September 2017	It	£6,070,542	Victoria & Abdul (#2), Mother! (#3), American Assassin (#4), The Jungle Bunch (#6)	
39	24 September 2017	Kingsman: The Golden Circle	£8,525,664		
40	1 October 2017	Kingsman: The Golden Circle	£4,187,105	Goodbye Christopher Robin (#4), Flatliners (#5), Home Again (#6)	
41	8 October 2017	Blade Runner 2049	£6,071,625	The Mountain Between Us (#4), Norma – Met Opera (#7)	
42	15 October 2017	The Lego Ninjago Movie	£3,642,038	The Snowman (#3), Botoks (#5), The Ritual (#7), Loving Vincent (#9), The Party (#10)	
43	22 October 2017	Blade Runner 2049	£1,791,027	Geostorm (#2), Happy Death Day (#4), The Death of Stalin (#5), My Little Pony (#6), Mersal (#9), Secret Superstar (#10)	
44	29 October 2017	Thor: Ragnarok	£12,375,804	Jigsaw (#2), Breathe (#8)	
45	5 November 2017	Murder on the Orient Express	£4,985,600	A Bad Moms Christmas (#3), Pokémon the Movie: I Choose You! (#9), The Killing of a Sacred Deer (#10)	
46	12 November 2017	Paddington 2	£8,260,160	Only the Brave (#7), The Florida Project (#8)	
47	19 November 2017	Justice League	£7,264,784	Film Stars Don't Die in Liverpool (#6), The Exterminating Angel – Met Opera (#10)	
48	26 November 2017	Daddy's Home 2	£4,919,051	Frozen (#5), (Note: Frozen, originally released in 2013, was re-released this week, accompanied by the short Olaf's Frozen Adventure) Battle of the Sexes (#7), Letters to Santa 3 (#9), Suburbicon (#10)	
49	3 December 2017	Paddington 2	£2,883,617	Wonder (#4), The Man Who Invented Christmas (#10)	
50	10 December 2017	Paddington 2	£1,690,027	The Disaster Artist (#6), (Note: The Disaster Artist charted at #13 for week ending 3 December 2017, before entering the top ten in its second week following an expanded opening.) The Nutcracker – Royal Opera House (#9), (Note: The Nutcracker charted at #11 for week ending 3 December 2017, before entering the top ten in its second week.) Stronger (#10)	
51	17 December 2017	Star Wars: The Last Jedi	£28,010,841		
52	24 December 2017	Star Wars: The Last Jedi	£10,158,640	Jumanji: Welcome to the Jungle (#2), Pitch Perfect 3 (#3), Ferdinand (#4), Tiger Zinda Hai (#7), It's a Wonderful Life (#8) (Note: It's a Wonderful Life, originally released in 1946, was re-released this week.)	
53	31 December 2017	Star Wars: The Last Jedi	£7,975,174	The Greatest Showman (#3)	

Preceded by 2016	2017	Succeeded by 2018
