= List of 2019 box office number-one films in the United Kingdom =

This is a list of films which have placed number one at the weekend box office in the United Kingdom during 2019.

== Films ==
†	This implies the highest-grossing movie of the year.

Week	Weekend End Date	Film	Total weekend gross (Pound sterling)	Weekend openings in the Top 10	Reference(s)
1	6 January 2019	Mary Poppins Returns (Note: Opened in 2018)	£4,444,023	The Favourite (#2), André Rieu's 2019 New Year Concert from Sydney (#4)	
2	13 January 2019	Stan & Ollie	£2,578,838	Colette (#7), The Upside (#8)	
3	20 January 2019	Glass	£3,423,380	Mary Queen of Scots (#2)	
4	27 January 2019	Glass	£1,936,631	Vice (#3), Dragon Ball Super: Broly (#7), The Mule (#8), A Dog's Way Home (#9), Love Yourself in Seoul – BTS World Tour (#10)	
5	3 February 2019	How to Train Your Dragon: The Hidden World	£5,323,448	Green Book (#2), Escape Room (#4), Can You Ever Forgive Me? (#8)	
6	10 February 2019	The Lego Movie 2: The Second Part	£4,016,730	Alita: Battle Angel (#2), All Is True (#10)	
7	17 February 2019	The Lego Movie 2: The Second Part	£2,472,489	Instant Family (#2), Happy Death Day 2U (#6), The Kid Who Would Be King (#7)	
8	24 February 2019	The Lego Movie 2: The Second Part	£2,410,824	Cold Pursuit (#6), On the Basis of Sex (#8), Total Dhamaal (#9)	
9	3 March 2019	Fighting with My Family	£2,022,174	The Aftermath (#6), Kobiety Mafii 2 (#10)	
10	10 March 2019	Captain Marvel	£12,750,000	The Sleeping Beauty – Bolshoi Ballet (#9)	
11	17 March 2019	Captain Marvel	£6,643,217	Fisherman's Friends (#2), What Men Want (#3), Misz Masz Czyli Kogel Mogel 4 (#9)	
12	24 March 2019	Captain Marvel	£3,378,583	Us (#2), The White Crow (#7), Five Feet Apart (#10)	
13	31 March 2019	Dumbo	£6,076,779	Die Walküre – Met Opera (#7), Lucifer (#8)	
14	7 April 2019	Shazam!	£4,067,068	Pet Sematary (#3), Peppa Pig: Festival of Fun (#5), Missing Link (#7), The Sisters Brothers (#9)	
15	14 April 2019	Dumbo	£2,345,046	Wonder Park (#3), Hellboy (#4), Wild Rose (#6), Little (#8)	
16	21 April 2019	Shazam!	£979,787	Kalank (#4), Red Joan (#5), Greta (#6)	
17	28 April 2019	Avengers: Endgame †	£43,400,000	Eighth Grade (#10)	
18	5 May 2019	Avengers: Endgame †	£14,331,192	Long Shot (#2), The Curse of La Llorona (#3), Tolkien (#4), A Dog's Journey (#5)	
19	12 May 2019	Detective Pikachu	£4,951,838	The Hustle (#3), Amazing Grace (#9), Dialogues of the Carmelites – Met Opera (#10)	
20	19 May 2019	John Wick: Chapter 3 – Parabellum	£3,562,524	PAW Patrol Mighty Pups (#5)	
21	26 May 2019	Aladdin	£7,066,773	Rocketman (#2), The Secret Life of Pets 2 (#3), Muklawa (#10)	
22	2 June 2019	Aladdin	£4,888,931	Godzilla: King of the Monsters (#2), Booksmart (#7), Ma (#8)	
23	9 June 2019	Aladdin	£3,929,625	Dark Phoenix (#2), Take That: Greatest Hits Live (#5), Bharat (#7), Casino Royale (#8)	
24	16 June 2019	Aladdin	£2,881,535	Men in Black: International (#2), Diego Maradona (#9)	
25	23 June 2019	Toy Story 4	£13,300,000	Brightburn (#5), Child's Play (#9)	
26	30 June 2019	Toy Story 4	£8,284,437	Yesterday (#2), Apollo 11 (#8)	
27	7 July 2019	Spider-Man: Far From Home	£14,148,624	Westlife: The Twenty Tour Live (#4), Midsommar (#5), The Queen's Corgi (#6), Anna (#9)	
28	14 July 2019	Spider-Man: Far From Home	£4,396,516	Annabelle Comes Home (#3), Stuber (#9), The Dead Don't Die (#10)	
29	21 July 2019	The Lion King	£16,671,765		
30	28 July 2019	The Lion King	£10,660,287	André Rieu 2019 Maastricht Concert – Shall We Dance? (#4), Horrible Histories: The Movie – Rotten Romans (#6), The Current War (#8)	
31	4 August 2019	Hobbs & Shaw	£6,377,583	Angry Birds 2 (#5), The Magic Flute – Glyndebourne 2019 (#10)	
32	11 August 2019	The Lion King	£4,366,824	Blinded by the Light (#4), Playmobil: The Movie (#7), Bring the Soul: The Movie (#10)	
33	18 August 2019	Once Upon a Time in Hollywood	£7,544,445	Dora and the Lost City of Gold (#4), Good Boys (#6)	
34	25 August 2019	Angel Has Fallen	£2,122,408	Scary Stories to Tell in the Dark (#5), Crawl (#7)	
35	1 September 2019	Once Upon a Time in Hollywood	£1,841,873	The Informer (#10)	
36	8 September 2019	It Chapter Two	£7,368,586	Polityka (#5)	
37	15 September 2019	Downton Abbey	£5,180,865	Hustlers (#3)	
38	22 September 2019	Downton Abbey	£3,280,442	Ad Astra (#2), Rambo: Last Blood (#4)	
39	29 September 2019	Downton Abbey	£2,682,080	Ready or Not (#4), The Goldfinch (#10)	
40	6 October 2019	Joker	£12,555,329	Judy (#2), War (#8)	
41	13 October 2019	Joker	£9,766,609	Abominable (#2), Gemini Man (#3), Turandot – Met Opera (#7), The Day Shall Come (#8)	
42	20 October 2019	Joker	£5,489,716	Maleficent: Mistress of Evil (#2), A Shaun the Sheep Movie: Farmageddon (#3), Zombieland: Double Tap (#4), Official Secrets (#7)	
43	27 October 2019	Joker	£3,464,683	Terminator: Dark Fate (#2), The Addams Family (#4), Countdown (#8), Bigil (#9)	
44	3 November 2019	Joker	£2,446,200	Doctor Sleep (#4), Sorry We Missed You (#9), DanTDM Presents The Contest (#10)	
45	10 November 2019	Joker	£1,668,466	The Aeronauts (#2), The Good Liar (#5), Midway (#6), 42nd Street - The Musical (#7)	
46	17 November 2019	Last Christmas	£2,654,354	Le Mans '66 (#2)	
47	24 November 2019	Frozen 2	£15,088,012	Blue Story (#3), 21 Bridges (#5), Akhnaten – Met Opera (#10)	
48	1 December 2019	Frozen 2	£8,711,498	Knives Out (#2), Charlie's Angels (#5), Proceder (#9), CBeebies Christmas Show 2019: Hansel & Gretel (#10)	
49	8 December 2019	Frozen 2	£4,397,903	Gremlins (#7), Motherless Brooklyn (#8), Elf (#9)	
50	15 December 2019	Jumanji: The Next Level	£9,464,661	Black Christmas (#5), The Nutcracker – Bolshoi Ballet (#7), Jak Poslubic Milionera (#9)	
51	22 December 2019	Star Wars: The Rise of Skywalker	£20,864,500	Cats (#2), Dabangg 3 (#7)	
52	29 December 2019	Star Wars: The Rise of Skywalker	£9,311,240	Little Women (#3), Spies in Disguise (#6), Playing with Fire (#7), Good Newwz (#9)	

== Notes ==
Preceded by 2018	2019	Succeeded by 2020
