= Wonderland (Take That album) =

Studio album by Take That
- Released: 24 March 2017
- Studios: Abbey Road Studios, London; Dean Street Studios, London; Electric Lady Studios, New York; Future Studios, London; The Hobby Shop, Los Angeles; Metropolis Studios, London; Mixsuite (Los Angeles and UK); Playground Studios, North Carolina; The Ranch, Woodland Hills, California; Tracques, Los Angeles
- Genre: Pop
- Length: 41:32
- Label: Polydor
- Producers: Mike Crossey; Tony Hoffer; Stuart Price; Mark Ralph; Charlie Russel; Sigma

Take That chronology
| III (2014) | Wonderland (2017) | Odyssey (2018) |

Singles from Wonderland
- 1. "Giants" Released: 17 February 2017; 2. "New Day" Released: 5 May 2017

Wonderland is the eighth studio album by English band Take That. It was released on 24 March 2017 through Polydor Records.

== Background ==
On 22 October 2016 Take That announced the album and its release date along with the tour dates for Wonderland Live in support of it, which started in May 2017. It was also confirmed that Robbie Williams and Jason Orange would not be rejoining the band for the album and tour. The band worked with various producers on the album including Tony Hoffer, Stuart Price and Mike Crossey.

== Critical reception ==
David Smyth from the London Evening Standard gave a positive three-star review, calling it "Enough to thrill the masses, and business as usual", and wrote: "Their eighth album overall feels like business as usual too, with a full sound, rich in arm-waving choruses and blandly uplifting lyrics ("Music makes me feel good," "We can conquer any mountain," "Every morning is a brand new day," etc.)." Michael Cragg from The Guardian gave a mixed two-star review, calling Take That "The boyband equivalent of a Reliant Robin", and went on to write: "the overwhelming feeling is of an album made purely to justify taking the show around the arenas. While that's not exactly a new concept, the cynicism of the idea bleeds into the music, with most of the tracks built around cavernous, chant heavy choruses."

== Promotion ==
=== Singles ===
"Cry" was released as a collaboration single with Drum and bass group Sigma on 20 May 2016 and is included on the deluxe version of the album.

"Giants" was released on 17 February 2017 as the first official group led single for the album and was produced by Mark Ralph. it peaked at 13 on the UK Singles Chart.

"New Day" was released on 5 May 2017 as the second single.

== Commercial performance ==
Wonderland debuted at number two on the UK Albums Chart with first week equivalent sales of 113,200 copies, giving Take That their eighth top five studio album. It reached number three in Ireland and also peaked at two in Scotland.

== Track listing ==
All tracks are written by Gary Barlow, Mark Owen and Howard Donald, additional songwriters are noted below.

| No. | Title | Writer(s) | Producer(s) | Length |
|---|---|---|---|---|
| 1. | "Wonderland" (lead vocals: Barlow, Donald) | Jamie Norton; Ben Mark | Charlie Russel | 4:53 |
| 2. | "Giants" (lead vocals: Barlow) | Norton; Mark | Mark Ralph | 3:53 |
| 3. | "New Day" (lead vocals: Barlow, Owen, Donald) | Simon Strömstedt | Ralph | 3:29 |
| 4. | "Lucky Stars" (lead vocals: Barlow, Owen, Donald) | Strömstedt; Noel Svahn | Stuart Price | 3:29 |
| 5. | "And the Band Plays" (lead vocals: Barlow) | | Russel | 3:53 |
| 6. | "Superstar" (lead vocals: Owen) | | Price | 3:14 |
| 7. | "Hope" (lead vocals: Barlow) | Tom Baxter | Tony Hoffer | 3:44 |
| 8. | "River" (lead vocals: Owen) | Norton; Mark | Mike Crossey | 2:55 |
| 9. | "The Last Poet" (lead vocals: Barlow) | | Price | 3:16 |
| 10. | "Every Revolution" (lead vocals: Donald) | Norton; Mark | Russel | 4:12 |
| 11. | "It's All for You" (lead vocals: Barlow) | | Hoffer | 4:29 |
| Total length: | | | | 41:32 |

Deluxe edition bonus tracks
| No. | Title | Writer(s) | Producer(s) | Length |
|---|---|---|---|---|
| 12. | "Don't Give Up on Me" (lead vocals: Barlow) | | Hoffer | 3:19 |
| 13. | "Up" (lead vocals: Owen) | Norton; Mark | Russel | 4:29 |
| 14. | "Come On Love" (lead vocals: Barlow) | | Ralph | 4:21 |
| 15. | "Cry" (Sigma featuring Take That) (lead vocals: Barlow) | Dominic Liu; Sean McDonagh; Matt Furmidge; Chiara Hunter; Cameron Edwards; Joseph Lenzie | Lenzie; Edwards | 3:17 |
| Total length: | | | | 57:00 |

== Personnel ==
Credits adapted from the liner notes.

=== Take That ===
- Gary Barlow – vocals, keyboards, programming (tracks 5, 6, 9)
- Mark Owen – vocals
- Howard Donald – vocals

=== Additional personnel ===
- Ryan Carline – keyboards and engineering (tracks 1, 3‒7, 9‒12), vocal production (1), programming (4), vocal engineering (8)
- Charlie Russell – programming (tracks 1, 5, 10, 13), keyboards and additional engineering (2), mixing (13)
- Ben Mark – guitar (tracks 1, 5, 10, 13), programming (1)
- Paul Turner – bass guitar (tracks 1, 5, 10, 13)
- Jamie Norton – piano, keyboards (tracks 1, 10, 13)
- Ash Soan – drums (tracks 1, 10, 13)
- Mike Stevens – saxophone (track 1)
- Nicolas Magriel – sarangi, tanpura (track 1)
- Jon Green – acoustic guitar, keyboards (track 5)
- Dan Broughton – drums (track 5)
- Tom Rees-Roberts, Andy Greenwood – trumpet (track 5)
- Pete Beachill, Richard Wigley – trombone (track 5)
- Philip Jewson – horn arrangement and conducting (track 5)
- Tom Upex – engineering (tracks 1, 5, 10, 13)
- Jonny Solway – assistant engineering (track 1), engineering (5, 10, 13)
- Charlie Rolfe – assistant engineering (tracks 5, 10, 13)
- Jack Hudson – assistant engineering (tracks 10, 13)
- Mark Ralph – bass guitar, guitar, synthesizer, programming (tracks 2, 3, 14), mandolin, ukulele (3)
- Geoff Holroyde – drums (tracks 2, 3, 14), backing vocals (2)
- Scott Ralph – horns, percussion (track 3)
- Tom AD Fuller – assistant engineering (tracks 2, 14), backing vocals (2), engineering (3)
- Drew Smith – assistant engineering (tracks 2, 14), engineering (3)
- Hayley Carline – backing vocals (tracks 3‒5)
- Andy Caine – backing vocals (tracks 3, 5)
- Will Malone – strings arrangement and conducting (tracks 2, 3, 11)
- Perry Montague‐Mason – strings leader (tracks 2, 3, 11)
- Isobel Griffiths – string contractor (tracks 2, 3, 11)
- Susie Gillis – assistant string contractor (tracks 2, 3, 11)
- Stuart Price – keyboards, programming (tracks 4, 6, 9), bass guitar, mixing (4), guitar (6, 9)
- Simon Strömstedt – backing vocals, keyboards, programming (track 4)
- Tony Hoffer – bass guitar, guitar, synthesizer, programming and engineering (tracks 7, 11, 12), mixing (12)
- Dave Palmer – keyboards (tracks 7, 11, 12)
- Denny Weston Jr. – drums (tracks 7, 11)
- Tom Baxter – guitar and string arrangement (track 7)
- Oli Langford – violin, viola and string arrangement (track 7)
- Danny Keane – cello (track 7)
- Cameron Lister – engineering (tracks 7, 11, 12), mixing (12)
- Mike Crossey – bass guitar, synthesizer, programming (track 8)
- Jonathan Gilmore – guitar and recording engineering (track 8)
- Rosie Crossey – drums (track 8)
- TSA "The Session Agency" – gospel choir (track 14)
- Priscilla Jones – gospel choir arrangement (track 14)
- Matt Furmidge and Dominic Joshua Alexander Liu for Metrophonic Productions – keyboards (track 15)
- Rosie Danvers at Wired Strings – strings (track 15)
- Sigma – production (track 15)
- Scott Rosser – mastering (track 15)
- Mark "Spike" Stent – mixing
- Geoff Swan – assistant mixing
- Michael Freeman – assistant mixing (except tracks 2, 3)
- Tim Young – mastering (except track 15)

== Charts ==
=== Weekly charts ===
Weekly chart performance for Wonderland
| Chart (2017) | Peak position |
|---|---|
| Australian Albums (ARIA) | 28 |
| Austrian Albums (Ö3 Austria) | 47 |
| Belgian Albums (Ultratop Flanders) | 43 |
| Belgian Albums (Ultratop Wallonia) | 75 |
| Dutch Albums (Album Top 100) | 48 |
| German Albums (Offizielle Top 100) | 19 |
| Greek Albums (IFPI) | 26 |
| Irish Albums (IRMA) | 3 |
| Italian Albums (FIMI) | 36 |
| Japanese Albums (Oricon) | 168 |
| Scottish Albums (Official Charts) | 2 |
| Spanish Albums (Promusicae) | 18 |
| Swiss Albums (Schweizer Hitparade) | 28 |
| UK Albums (Official Charts) | 2 |
| UK Vinyl Albums Chart (OCC) | 39 |

=== Year-end charts ===
Year-end chart performance for Wonderland
| Chart (2017) | Position |
|---|---|
| UK Albums (OCC) | 13 |

== Certifications ==
Certifications for Wonderland
| Region | Certification | Certified units/sales |
|---|---|---|
| United Kingdom (BPI) | Gold | 100,000^{‡} |
^{‡} Sales+streaming figures based on certification alone.
