= Odyssey (Take That album) =

Greatest hits album / Remix album by Take That
- Released: 23 November 2018
- Genres: Pop, pop rock, dance-pop, alternative rock
- Length: 101:50
- Label: Polydor

Take That chronology
Wonderland (2017)	Odyssey (2018)	Odyssey: Greatest Hits Live (2019)

Singles from Odyssey
- 1. "Pray (Odyssey version)" Released: 21 September 2018; 2. "Out of Our Heads" Released: 11 October 2018

Odyssey is a greatest hits/remix album by English band Take That. It was released on 23 November 2018 by Polydor Records. The collection features songs "re-imagined with new arrangements and production" by Stuart Price. Odyssey also includes three new tracks—"Out of Our Heads", "Spin", and "Everlasting". Odyssey debuted at number one on the UK Albums Chart, becoming the band's eighth number-one album and the fastest selling album by an artist of 2018, selling over 100,000 copies in its first week.

== Background ==
As well as being mixed by Stuart Price, the album includes interview snippets throughout featuring all five Take That members. Gary Barlow stated the time of the standard greatest hits is "over" as fans can get all of an artist's songs online already, so the band wanted to release a different kind of collection. The album also features appearances from Barry Gibb and Boyz II Men.

In an interview with The Daily Telegraph about the album, Barlow stated; "If I could be bold, I don't give a shit whether the new album's a hit or not. [...] Even if it's a flop, we're still going to go on tour next year and play to 600,000 people."

== Reception ==
Professional ratings
Review scores
Source	Rating
Clash	7/10
Evening Standard	3/5 stars

In a positive review for Clash, Chloe Waterhouse notes that the album stands to "entertain their older fans as intended, and rejuvenate classics which add a pleasing new layer to their sound". Andre Paine, writing for the Evening Standard, said it was "shameless nostalgia that suggests [Take That's] legacy is in safe hands".

== Track listing ==
Disc 1
No.	Title	Writer(s)	Producer(s)	Length
1.	"Greatest Day" (Odyssey mix)	Gary Barlow; Howard Donald; Jason Orange; Mark Owen	John Shanks; Stuart Price^{[a]}	4:22
2.	"It Only Takes a Minute" (Odyssey mix)	Dennis Lambert; Brian Potter	Nigel Wright	3:20
3.	"These Days" (Odyssey mix)	Barlow; Donald; Owen; Jamie Norton; Ben Mark	Greg Kurstin	3:37
4.	"Could It Be Magic" (Odyssey version)	Bibi Anderson; Barry Manilow; Adrienne Anderson	Ian Levine; Billy Griffin; The Rapino Brothers; Price^{[a]}	3:20
5.	"Everything Changes" (Odyssey version)	Barlow; Michael Ward; Eliot Kennedy; Cary Baylis	Price; Ward^{[b]}; Kennedy^{[b]}; Baylis^{[b]}	2:48
6.	"Travel Interlude"	Barlow; Donald; Owen	Price	0:21
7.	"Out of Our Heads"	Barlow; Donald; Owen	Price	2:52
8.	"A Million Love Songs" (Odyssey mix)	Barlow	Levine; Griffin; Shanks	4:17
9.	"Sure" (Odyssey mix)	Barlow; Owen; Robbie Williams	Brothers in Rhythm; Barlow	3:43
10.	"Love Ain't Here Anymore" (featuring Boyz II Men) (Odyssey version)	Barlow	Price	3:58
11.	"Spin"	Barlow; Donald; Owen; Norton; Mark	Price; Norton	3:35
12.	"Cry" (with Sigma) (Odyssey mix)	Barlow; Donald; Owen; Matt Furmidge; Dom Liu; Sean McDonagh; Chiara Hunter; Cameron Edwards; Joseph Lenzie	Sigma	3:27
13.	"Said It All" (Odyssey mix)	Barlow; Donald; Orange; Owen; Steve Robson	Shanks	5:10
14.	"How Deep Is Your Love" (featuring Barry Gibb) (Odyssey version)	Barry Gibb; Robin Gibb; Maurice Gibb	Price	3:06

Disc 2
No.	Title	Writer(s)	Producer(s)	Length
1.	"Let's Do It Again Interlude"	Barlow; Donald; Orange; Owen	Price	1:34
2.	"Patience" (Odyssey mix)	Barlow; Donald; Orange; Owen; Shanks	Shanks	3:34
3.	"The Flood" (Odyssey mix)	Barlow; Donald; Orange; Owen; Williams	Price	5:02
4.	"Back for Good" (Odyssey mix)	Barlow	Chris Porter; Barlow	3:57
5.	"Get Ready for It" (Odyssey alt intro)	Barlow; Donald; Owen; Robson	Shanks	4:06
6.	"Everlasting"	Barlow; Donald; Owen; George Tizzard; Rick Parkhouse	Price; Tizzard^{[a]}; Parkhouse^{[a]}	3:49
7.	"Giants" (Odyssey mix)	Barlow; Donald; Owen; Norton; Mark	Mark Ralph	3:59
8.	"Shine" (Odyssey alt intro)	Barlow; Donald; Orange; Owen; Robson	Shanks	4:04
9.	"Never Forget" (Odyssey mix)	Barlow	Jim Steinman; Brothers in Rhythm; Dave James	5:25
10.	"Relight My Fire" (featuring Lulu) (Odyssey version)	Dan Hartman	Price; Ryan Carline^{[a]}; Norton^{[a]}; Joey Negro^{[b]}; Andrew Livingstone^{[b]}	5:15
11.	"Babe" (Odyssey version)	Barlow	Price; Jonathan Wales; Steve Jervier^{[b]}; Paul Jervier^{[b]}	4:24
12.	"Pray" (Odyssey version)	Barlow	Price; Wales; Jervier^{[b]}; Jervier^{[b]}	3:40
13.	"Rule the World" (Odyssey version)	Barlow; Donald; Orange; Owen	Price; Shanks; Imogen Heap^{[a]}	4:54

Notes

- ^{^[a]} signifies an additional producer
- ^{^[b]} signifies a vocal producer

== Charts ==
=== Weekly charts ===
Chart (2018)	Peak position
Australian Albums (ARIA)	63
Austrian Albums (Ö3 Austria)	55
Belgian Albums (Ultratop Flanders)	42
Belgian Albums (Ultratop Wallonia)	102
Dutch Albums (Album Top 100)	85
German Albums (Offizielle Top 100)	18
Irish Albums (IRMA)	3
Italian Albums (FIMI)	80
Japanese Albums (Oricon)	248
Scottish Albums (Official Charts)	1
Spanish Albums (PROMUSICAE)	54
Swiss Albums (Schweizer Hitparade)	45
Taiwanese Albums (G-Music)	9
UK Albums (Official Charts)	1
UK Vinyl Albums Chart (OCC)	4

=== Year-end charts ===
Chart (2018)	Position
UK Albums (OCC)	11

Chart (2019)	Position
UK Albums (OCC)	44

== Certifications ==
Region	Certification	Certified units/sales
United Kingdom (BPI)	Platinum	300,000^{‡}
^{‡} Sales+streaming figures based on certification alone.
