= New Day (Take That song) =

Single by Take That

from the album Wonderland
- Released: 5 May 2017
- Genre: Pop
- Length: 3:33
- Label: Polydor Records
- Songwriter(s): Gary Barlow; Mark Owen; Howard Donald; Simon Strömstedt
- Producer(s): Mark Ralph

Take That singles chronology
"Giants" (2017)	"New Day" (2017)	"Pray (Odyssey version)" (2018)

Music video
- "New Day" on YouTube

"New Day" is a song by the English pop group Take That. It was released by Polydor Records on 5 May 2017 from their eighth studio album, Wonderland (2017). It was written by Take That and Simon Strömstedt and produced by Mark Ralph. It features all band members on lead vocals.

== Live performances ==
Take That performed the song live for the first time on An Evening With Take That, a television special for ITV broadcast on 8 April 2017.

== Critical reception ==
Joe Anderton from Digital Spy stated "the anthemic chorus is definitely something you will probably sing out loud in a field come festival season." David Smyth from the London Evening Standard wrote that there was a "full sound rich in arm-waving choruses and blandly uplifting lyrics (“Music makes me feel good,” “We can conquer any mountain,” “Every morning is a brand new day,” etc)". Michael Cragg from The Guardian commented "gratingly chipper New Day’s sugar-soaked “Wake up it’s a brand new day, everybody’s got to sing the storm away.” Like an earlier single, Shine, New Day is the sort of laser-guided, focus-grouped, mums-swaying-in-row-three anthem that advertising executives masturbate over, it sounds expensive and empty. (The song closes with Barlow repeating, “Every morning is a brand new day”, as if we hadn’t figured that out yet)".

== Music video ==
The music video was directed by Gregg Masuak. Masuak had previously directed music videos for the group in the '90s: Pray, Babe, Everything Changes and Sure. Digital Spy labelled the music video as "surprisingly creepy".

The music video has elements of horror and has the band members in different locations and scenarios. The group descend onto an open field where they are surrounded by numerous horror figures. The band members take control of the situation by organising a call and response where they teach the group dance steps and the video closes with them all dancing together.

== Track listings ==
- CD single
1. "New Day" – 3:33
2. "New Day (Instrumental)" – 3:31

== Personnel ==
- Gary Barlow – lead vocals
- Mark Owen – lead vocals
- Howard Donald – lead vocals
- Ryan Carline – keyboards and engineering
- Mark Ralph – bass guitar, guitar, synthesizer, programming
- Geoff Holroyde – drums
- Scott Ralph – horns, percussion
- Hayley Carline – backing vocals
- Andy Caine – backing vocals
- Will Malone – strings arrangement and conducting
- Perry Montague‐Mason – strings leader
- Isobel Griffiths – string contractor
- Susie Gillis – assistant string contractor
