= List of 2014 box office number-one films in the United Kingdom =

This is a list of films which have reached number one at the weekend box office in the United Kingdom during 2014.

== Films ==
†	This implies the highest-grossing movie of the year.

Week	Weekend end date	Film	Total weekend gross (Pound sterling)	Weekend openings in the Top 10	Reference(s)
1	5 January 2014	American Hustle	£3,467,644	Last Vegas (#4), Paranormal Activity: The Marked Ones (#5), Mandela: Long Walk to Freedom (#7)	
2	12 January 2014	12 Years a Slave	£2,511,348	The Railway Man (#6), Delivery Man (#7)	
3	19 January 2014	The Wolf of Wall Street	£4,655,984	Devil's Due (#5)	
4	26 January 2014	The Wolf of Wall Street	£3,608,968	Jack Ryan: Shadow Recruit (#3), Inside Llewyn Davis (#6), August: Osage County (#7)	
5	2 February 2014	The Wolf of Wall Street	£2,385,585	That Awkward Moment (#3), I, Frankenstein (#4), Lone Survivor (#6)	
6	9 February 2014	Mr. Peabody & Sherman	£3,916,559	RoboCop (#2), Dallas Buyers Club (#4), Rusalka: Met Opera 2014 (#10)	
7	16 February 2014	The Lego Movie †	£8,051,140	The Monuments Men (#2), Tinker Bell and the Pirate Fairy (#6), Cuban Fury (#7), Endless Love (#8)	
8	23 February 2014	The Lego Movie †	£5,978,904		
9	2 March 2014	The Lego Movie †	£3,226,594	Non-Stop (#2), Ride Along (#3), The Book Thief (#4)	
10	9 March 2014	300: Rise of an Empire	£2,761,612	The Grand Budapest Hotel (#3), Escape from Planet Earth (#7)	
11	16 March 2014	Need for Speed	£2,011,249	Under the Skin (#10)	
12	23 March 2014	The Grand Budapest Hotel	£1,267,408	Starred Up (#6), A Long Way Down (#7), Labor Day (#8)	
13	30 March 2014	Captain America: The Winter Soldier	£6,037,850	Muppets Most Wanted (#2), The Legend of Hercules (#9)	
14	6 April 2014	Rio 2	£2,882,680	Noah (#3), Divergent (#4), La Bohème: Met Opera 2014 (#7), The Double (#8)	
15	13 April 2014	Captain America: The Winter Soldier	£1,782,201	The Quiet Ones (#5), Calvary (#7), The Raid 2 (#8)	
16	20 April 2014	The Amazing Spider-Man 2	£9,011,114	The Love Punch (#5), Locke (#9), 2 States (#10)	
17	27 April 2014	The Amazing Spider-Man 2	£3,366,372	The Other Woman (#2), Transcendence (#3), Cosi Fan Tutte: Met Opera 2014 (#7)	
18	4 May 2014	The Amazing Spider-Man 2	£1,984,667	Pompeii (#3), Tarzan (#4), Plastic (#10)	
19	11 May 2014	Bad Neighbours	£8,446,240	Sabotage (#7), La Cenerentola: Met Opera 2014 (#8), Frank (#10)	
20	18 May 2014	Godzilla	£6,385,483	The Two Faces of January (#5), The Wind Rises (#9)	
21	25 May 2014	X-Men: Days of Future Past	£9,144,971	Postman Pat: The Movie (#4), Blended (#5)	
22	1 June 2014	Maleficent	£6,590,071	Edge of Tomorrow (#3), A Million Ways to Die in the West (#4), Jimmy's Hall (#10)	
23	8 June 2014	22 Jump Street	£4,854,991	D-Day 70 Years On (#7), Grace of Monaco (#9)	
24	15 June 2014	22 Jump Street	£2,255,100	Oculus (#5), Belle (#6), Devil's Knot (#9)	
25	22 June 2014	The Fault in Our Stars	£3,434,334	Jersey Boys (#6), 3 Days to Kill (#7), Humshakals (#10)	
26	29 June 2014	Mrs. Brown's Boys D'Movie	£4,301,306	Chef (#5), How to Train Your Dragon 2 (#6), Walking on Sunshine (#7)	
27	6 July 2014	Mrs. Brown's Boys D'Movie	£2,188,761	Tammy (#5)	
28	13 July 2014	Transformers: Age of Extinction	£11,751,427	Begin Again (#5), Boyhood (#7)	
29	20 July 2014	Dawn of the Planet of the Apes	£8,705,995	Monty Python Live (Mostly) (#4), Pudsey the Dog: The Movie (#7)	
30	27 July 2014	Dawn of the Planet of the Apes	£3,752,511	Hercules (#2), The Purge: Anarchy (#3), Earth to Echo (#6), Kick (#8), The House of Magic (#10)	
31	3 August 2014	Guardians of the Galaxy	£6,363,110	The Nut Job (#6), Back to the Future (#7), Step Up: All In (#9)	
32	10 August 2014	The Inbetweeners 2	£12,538,114	Planes: Fire & Rescue (#4)	
33	17 August 2014	The Inbetweeners 2	£4,309,832	The Expendables 3 (#3), Hector and the Search for Happiness (#9)	
34	24 August 2014	Lucy	£3,076,997	Into the Storm (#4), Deliver Us from Evil (#5), What If? (#6), Doctor Who: Deep Breath (#8)	
35	31 August 2014	Lucy	£1,972,039	Let's Be Cops (#2), If I Stay (#6), As Above, So Below (#8)	
36	7 September 2014	Sex Tape	£1,431,058	Before I Go to Sleep (#3), The Hundred-Foot Journey (#4), The Guest (#8)	
37	14 September 2014	The Boxtrolls	£2,000,597	Pride (#3), A Most Wanted Man (#5)	
38	21 September 2014	The Boxtrolls	£1,333,137	A Walk Among the Tombstones (#2), The Riot Club (#5), 20,000 Days on Earth (#8)	
39	28 September 2014	Billy Elliot the Musical Live	£1,904,098	The Equalizer (#2), What We Did on Our Holiday (#4)	
40	5 October 2014	Gone Girl	£4,109,628	Dracula Untold (#2), Bang Bang! (#6), Dolphin Tale (#7)	
41	12 October 2014	Gone Girl	£3,064,545	The Maze Runner (#2), Annabelle (#3), One Direction: Where We Are – The Concert Film (#4), The Rewrite (#8)	
42	19 October 2014	Teenage Mutant Ninja Turtles	£4,785,448	The Best of Me (#5), The Judge (#9), Northern Soul (#10)	
43	26 October 2014	Fury	£2,692,786	The Book of Life (#4), Alexander and the Terrible, Horrible, No Good, Very Bad Day (#7), Happy New Year (#8), Love, Rosie (#9), The Babadook (#10)	
44	2 November 2014	Teenage Mutant Ninja Turtles	£1,429,159	Ouija (#2), Nightcrawler (#6), Mr. Turner (#7)	
45	9 November 2014	Interstellar	£5,378,220		
46	16 November 2014	Interstellar	£3,777,804	The Imitation Game (#2), Nativity 3: Dude, Where's My Donkey? (#3), The Drop (#5)	
47	23 November 2014	The Hunger Games: Mockingjay – Part 1	£12,654,109	Il Barbiere Di Siviglia: Met Opera 2014 (#8)	
48	30 November 2014	Paddington	£5,125,519	Horrible Bosses 2 (#4), Hockney (#8)	
49	7 December 2014	Paddington	£3,837,885	Penguins of Madagascar (#3), Get Santa (#6), St. Vincent (#9), Black Sea (#10)	
50	14 December 2014	The Hobbit: The Battle of the Five Armies	£9,753,642	Tinker Bell and the Legend of the NeverBeast (#7)	
51	21 December 2014	The Hobbit: The Battle of the Five Armies	£5,409,312	Night at the Museum: Secret of the Tomb (#3), Dumb and Dumber To (#4), PK (#7)	
52	28 December 2014	The Hobbit: The Battle of the Five Armies	£4,249,226	Exodus: Gods and Kings (#2), Annie (#4), Unbroken (#7)	

Preceded by 2013	2014	Succeeded by 2015
