= List of 2020 box office number-one films in the United Kingdom =

This is a list of films which have placed number one at the weekend box office in the United Kingdom during 2020.

== Films ==
†	This implies the highest-grossing movie of the year.

Week	Weekend End Date	Film	Total weekend gross (Pound sterling)	Weekend openings in the Top 10	Reference(s)
1	5 January 2020	Star Wars: The Rise of Skywalker (Note: Opened in 2019)	£4,396,258	The Gentlemen (#3), Jojo Rabbit (#5), André Rieu: 70 Years Young (#6)	
2	12 January 2020	1917 †	£7,446,302		
3	19 January 2020	1917 †	£6,190,049	Bad Boys for Life (#2), Bombshell (#7), Just Mercy (#9)	
4	26 January 2020	1917 †	£4,518,270	The Personal History of David Copperfield (#3), PAW Patrol: Ready, Race, Rescue (#10)	
5	2 February 2020	1917 †	£2,798,457	Queen & Slim (#7), A Beautiful Day in the Neighborhood (#8), Porgy and Bess – MET Opera (#9), The Lighthouse (#10)	
6	9 February 2020	Dolittle	£5,085,520	Birds of Prey (#2), Parasite (#4)	
7	16 February 2020	Sonic the Hedgehog	£4,733,768	Emma. (#6), 365 dni (#8)	
8	23 February 2020	Sonic the Hedgehog	£4,171,244	The Call of the Wild (#4), Like a Boss (#8), Brahms: The Boy II (#9)	
9	1 March 2020	The Invisible Man	£2,163,798	Dark Waters (#4)	
10	8 March 2020	Onward	£3,419,500	Military Wives (#3), Fantasy Island (#7)	
11	15 March 2020	Onward	£1,272,748	The Hunt (#3), Bloodshot (#4), Misbehaviour (#7), My Spy (#8)	
12	22 March 2020	The Invisible Man	£105,000		
13–26	29 March 2020 – 28 June 2020	British cinemas closed and box office reporting suspended due to the COVID-19 pandemic			
27	5 July 2020	Onward	£21,626	Trolls World Tour (#2), The Greatest Showman (#4), Dirty Dancing (#6), Grease (#7), The Terminator (#8), Star Wars (#9), Fight Club (#10)	
28	12 July 2020	The Empire Strikes Back	£50,406	Black Water: Abyss (#3), The Shawshank Redemption (#8), Harry Potter and the Philosopher's Stone (#9)	
29	19 July 2020	Onward	£49,271	Dreambuilders (#6), Harry Potter and the Chamber of Secrets (#8), A Star Is Born (#9)	
30	26 July 2020	Onward	£60,074	The Lord of the Rings: The Fellowship of the Ring (#5), Stage Mother (#7), The Dark Knight Rises (#8)	
31	2 August 2020	Unhinged	£175,263	100% Wolf (#3), The Vigil (#5), Proxima (#6), Jurassic Park (#9)	
32	9 August 2020	Unhinged	£115,188	An American Pickle (#4), The Lord of the Rings: The Two Towers (#10)	
33	16 August 2020	Inception	£207,675	Pinocchio (#3), Broken Law (#6), Babyteeth (#8)	
34	23 August 2020	Unhinged	£178,820	The Karate Kid (#9)	
35	30 August 2020	Tenet	£5,335,654	Hope Gap (#7), Bring the Soul: The Movie (#8) (Note: Originally opened at number 10 in August 2019)	
36	6 September 2020	Tenet	£2,151,490	The New Mutants (#2), After We Collided (#6), Black Panther (#9), Les Misérables (#10)	
37	13 September 2020	Tenet	£1,233,090	Break the Silence: The Movie (#3), The Broken Hearts Gallery (#6), Petla (#7)	
38	20 September 2020	Tenet	£796,309	Bill & Ted Face the Music (#3), André Rieu's Magical Maastricht: Together In Music (#4), Rocks (#7), White Riot (#9)	
39	27 September 2020	Tenet	£648,517	Schemers (#10)	
40	4 October 2020	Tenet	£628,148	Cats & Dogs 3: Paws Unite! (#2), The Elfkins – Baking a Difference (#5), On the Rocks (#7), David Attenborough: A Life On Our Planet (#8)	
41	11 October 2020	Tenet	£296,049	Saint Maud (#2), Akira (#3), Kajillionaire (#10)	
42	18 October 2020	Tenet	£187,275	Michael Ball & Alfie Boe: Back Together (#2), Hocus Pocus (#7), I Am Greta (#8)	
43	25 October 2020	Two By Two: Overboard!	£329,265	Honest Thief (#2), The Secret Garden (#3), Pixie (#5), All My Life (#9), Max Winslow and the House of Secrets (#10)	
44	1 November 2020	Two By Two: Overboard!	£190,761	The Craft: Legacy (#5), Halloween (#8)	
45	8 November 2020	The Three Kings	£3,521	Words on Bathroom Walls (#4), Wolfwalkers (#7), A Christmas Gift from Bob (#9)	
46	15 November 2020	The Secret Garden	£5,147	Billie (#2), War Horse: National Theatre Live 2014 (#4)	
47	22 November 2020	Two By Two: Overboard!	£3,422	Collective (#3), The Kid Detective (#7)	
48	29 November 2020	Home Alone	£2,705	Wolfwalkers (#5), The Muppet Christmas Carol (#7), Back to the Future (#9), Harry Potter and the Order of the Phoenix (#10)	
49	6 December 2020	Elf (Note: Originally peaked at number 2 when first released in 2003)	£48,244	A Christmas Carol (#4), The Grinch (#8), Die Hard (#9), Katherine Jenkins' Christmas Spectacular (#10)	
50	13 December 2020	Elf	£98,157	Little Mix: LM5 - The Tour Film (#3), Superintelligence (#4)	
51	20 December 2020	Wonder Woman 1984	£846,435	Come Away (#4)	
52	27 December 2020	Wonder Woman 1984	£72,674		

== Highest-grossing films ==
Highest-grossing films of 2020 by In-year release
Rank	Title	Distributor	Domestic gross
1.	1917	eOne	£43,944,156
2.	Sonic the Hedgehog	Paramount	£19,301,130
3.	Tenet	Warner Bros.	£17,568,023
4.	Bad Boys for Life	Sony	£16,214,071
5.	Dolittle	Universal	£15,946,599
6.	The Gentlemen	Entertainment	£12,248,887
7.	Parasite	StudioCanal	£12,121,140
8.	Birds of Prey	Warner Bros.	£8,825,588
9.	Jojo Rabbit	Disney	£8,131,485
10.	Onward	Disney	£7,676,576

Preceded by 2019	2020	Succeeded by 2021
