= List of 2013 box office number-one films in the United Kingdom =

This is a list of films which have reached number one at the weekend box office in the United Kingdom during 2013.

== Films ==
†	This implies the highest-grossing movie of the year.

Week	Weekend end date	Film	Total weekend gross (Pound sterling)	Weekend openings in the Top 10	Reference(s)
1	6 January 2013	The Hobbit: An Unexpected Journey (Note: Opened in 2012)	£4,075,781	The Impossible (#2), Quartet (#4)	
2	13 January 2013	Les Misérables	£8,127,991	Gangster Squad (#3), Texas Chainsaw 3D (#6)	
3	20 January 2013	Les Misérables	£4,406,828	Django Unchained (#2)	
4	27 January 2013	Les Misérables	£4,016,611	Lincoln (#3), Zero Dark Thirty (#5), Movie 43 (#7), Monsters, Inc. 3D (#8), The Last Stand (#10)	
5	3 February 2013	Les Misérables	£2,785,143	Flight (#3), Bullet to the Head (#9)	
6	10 February 2013	Wreck-It Ralph	£4,526,380	I Give It a Year (#3), Warm Bodies (#6), Hitchcock (#8)	
7	17 February 2013	A Good Day to Die Hard	£4,551,115	This Is 40 (#3), Beautiful Creatures (#5), Sammy's Great Escape (#8)	
8	24 February 2013	Wreck-It Ralph	£3,420,196	Mama (#3), Cloud Atlas (#6), Song for Marion (#8)	
9	3 March 2013	Hansel & Gretel: Witch Hunters	£1,502,782	Safe Haven (#5), Broken City (#7), Arbitrage (#9), Stoker (#10)	
10	10 March 2013	Oz the Great and Powerful	£3,712,948	Side Effects (#2), Parker (#4), The Guilt Trip (#7)	
11	17 March 2013	Oz the Great and Powerful	£2,609,465	Welcome to the Punch (#3), The Incredible Burt Wonderstone (#6), Red Dawn (#7)	
12	24 March 2013	The Croods	£5,372,290	Jack the Giant Slayer (#2), Identity Thief (#4), Stolen (#7)	
13	31 March 2013	The Croods	£3,305,642	G.I. Joe: Retaliation (#2), Trance (#3), The Host (#5), Finding Nemo (#9), Dans La Maison (In the House) (#10)	
14	7 April 2013	The Croods	£2,364,348	Dark Skies (#3), Spring Breakers (#9), The Odd Life of Timothy Green (#10)	
15	14 April 2013	Oblivion	£4,959,386	Scary Movie 5 (#3), The Place Beyond the Pines (#4)	
16	21 April 2013	Olympus Has Fallen	£2,247,900	Evil Dead (#3), Love Is All You Need (#7)	
17	28 April 2013	Iron Man 3	£13,711,048	The Look of Love (#7)	
18	5 May 2013	Iron Man 3	£6,307,191	21 & Over (#2), All Stars (#4), I'm So Excited (#7), Dead Man Down (#8)	
19	12 May 2013	Star Trek Into Darkness	£8,431,574	Mud (#7)	
20	19 May 2013	Fast & Furious 6	£8,717,534	The Great Gatsby (#2)	
21	26 May 2013	The Hangover Part III	£5,964,619	Epic (#3), The Moth Diaries (#7)	
22	2 June 2013	The Hangover Part III	£2,917,887	The Purge (#6), The Big Wedding (#7), Yeh Jawaani Hai Deewani (#9), Byzantium (#10)	
23	9 June 2013	After Earth	£2,249,532	Behind the Candelabra (#8), The Stone Roses: Made of Stone (#9), The Iceman (#10)	
24	16 June 2013	Man of Steel	£11,198,786	Yeh Jawaani Hai Deewani (#10)	
25	23 June 2013	Man of Steel	£5,073,356	World War Z (#2), Snitch (#6), Before Midnight (#8)	
26	30 June 2013	Despicable Me 2 †	£14,822,427	This is the End (#4), Hummingbird (#5)	
27	7 July 2013	Despicable Me 2 †	£3,996,837	Now You See Me (#2), The Internship (#3), The Bling Ring (#7), Lootera (#8), Singam II (#9)	
28	14 July 2013	Monsters University	£3,463,917	Pacific Rim (#3), Bhaag Milkha Bhaag (#9)	
29	21 July 2013	Monsters University	£2,791,078	The World's End (#2), The Frozen Ground (#9)	
30	28 July 2013	The Wolverine	£4,694,092	Frances Ha (#9)	
31	4 August 2013	The Smurfs 2	£3,220,911	The Heat (#2), The Conjuring (#3), Red 2 (#7), Only God Forgives (#9)	
32	11 August 2013	Alan Partridge: Alpha Papa	£2,175,850	Percy Jackson: Sea of Monsters (#2), Grown Ups 2 (#3), The Lone Ranger (#5), Chennai Express (#10)	
33	18 August 2013	Kick-Ass 2	£2,482,187	Planes (#2), 2 Guns (#3)	
34	25 August 2013	Elysium	£3,127,005	We're the Millers (#2), The Mortal Instruments: City of Bones (#4)	
35	1 September 2013	One Direction: This Is Us	£3,471,872	Pain & Gain (#4), The Way Way Back (#6), You're Next (#7)	
36	8 September 2013	About Time	£1,761,079	Riddick (#2)	
37	15 September 2013	Insidious: Chapter 2	£2,877,742	Rush (#2), White House Down (#3), Justin and the Knights of Valour (#5)	
38	22 September 2013	Rush	£1,336,449	Diana (#5), R.I.P.D. (#7), The Call (#8)	
39	29 September 2013	Prisoners	£1,365,527	Blue Jasmine (#3), Runner, Runner (#4)	
40	6 October 2013	Prisoners	£1,107,641	Filth (#2), Sunshine on Leith (#3)	
41	13 October 2013	Prisoners	£968,990	The Fifth Estate (#6)	
42	20 October 2013	Turbo	£3,892,774	Captain Phillps (#2), Escape Plan (#3), Boss (#9)	
43	27 October 2013	Cloudy with a Chance of Meatballs 2	£3,658,619	Jackass Presents: Bad Grandpa (#3), Ender's Game (#5), One Chance (#6)	
44	3 November 2013	Thor: The Dark World	£8,668,172	Philomena (#4), Krrish 3 (#8)	
45	10 November 2013	Gravity	£6,238,375		
46	17 November 2013	Gravity	£4,838,152	The Counselor (#4), The Butler (#5), Goliyon Ki Raasleela Ram-Leela (#10)	
47	24 November 2013	The Hunger Games: Catching Fire	£12,189,733	Doctor Who: The Day of the Doctor (#3), The Family (#8), André Rieu: Home for Christmas (#9)	
48	1 December 2013	The Hunger Games: Catching Fire	£5,525,476	Free Birds (#3), Saving Mr. Banks (#4), Carrie (#5)	
49	8 December 2013	Frozen	£4,704,940	Homefront (#5), Nebraska (#10)	
50	15 December 2013	The Hobbit: The Desolation of Smaug	£9,325,626	Falstaff: Met Opera 2013 (#6)	
51	22 December 2013	The Hobbit: The Desolation of Smaug	£5,358,380	Anchorman 2: The Legend Continues (#2), Walking With Dinosaurs (#4), Dhoom 3 (#5), The Harry Hill Movie (#7), Moshi Monsters: The Movie (#8)	
52	29 December 2013	The Hobbit: The Desolation of Smaug	£5,450,824	The Secret Life of Walter Mitty (#4), 47 Ronin (#5)	

== Notes ==
Preceded by 2012	2013	Succeeded by 2014
