= List of 2015 box office number-one films in the United Kingdom =

This is a list of films which have placed number one at the weekend box office in the United Kingdom during 2015.

== Films ==
†	This implies the highest-grossing movie of the year.

Week	Weekend end date	Film	Total weekend gross (Pound sterling)	Weekend openings in the Top 10	Reference(s)
1	4 January 2015	The Theory of Everything	£3,749,689	The Woman in Black: Angel of Death (#4), Birdman (#7)	
2	11 January 2015	Taken 3	£6,714,530	Into the Woods (#2), Foxcatcher (#6)	
3	18 January 2015	Taken 3	£3,295,309	American Sniper (#2), Whiplash (#7), Wild (#9)	
4	25 January 2015	American Sniper	£2,539,534	Ex Machina (#5), Mortdecai (#7), The Gambler (#8)	
5	1 February 2015	Big Hero 6	£4,293,286	Kingsman: The Secret Service (#2), Inherent Vice (#9)	
6	8 February 2015	Big Hero 6	£2,540,116	Shaun the Sheep Movie (#3), Jupiter Ascending (#4), Selma (#6)	
7	15 February 2015	Fifty Shades of Grey	£13,550,290	Peppa Pig: The Golden Boots (#6)	
8	22 February 2015	Fifty Shades of Grey	£4,597,092	The Wedding Ringer (#5), Project Almanac (#6)	
9	1 March 2015	The Second Best Exotic Marigold Hotel	£3,771,852	Focus (#3), The Boy Next Door (#7), It Follows (#8)	
10	8 March 2015	The Second Best Exotic Marigold Hotel	£1,957,256	Chappie (#4), Still Alice (#8), Unfinished Business (#9)	
11	15 March 2015	The Second Best Exotic Marigold Hotel	£1,409,311	Run All Night (#2), Suite Française (#4)	
12	22 March 2015	Home	£6,025,917	The Divergent Series: Insurgent (#2), The Gunman (#5), Wild Card (#10)	
13	29 March 2015	Cinderella	£3,803,799	The SpongeBob Movie: Sponge Out of Water (#3), Get Hard (#4), Seventh Son (#7), Wild Tales (#9)	
14	5 April 2015	Fast & Furious 7	£12,765,033	The Water Diviner (#7), While We're Young (#8), Blade Runner (#9)	
15	12 April 2015	Fast & Furious 7	£5,407,918	The Duff (#4), John Wick (#6), Woman in Gold (#7), Paul Blart: Mall Cop 2 (#8)	
16	19 April 2015	Fast & Furious 7	£3,039,720	Child 44 (#4), A Little Chaos (#7)	
17	26 April 2015	Avengers: Age of Ultron	£18,015,774	The Falling (#10)	
18	3 May 2015	Avengers: Age of Ultron	£8,591,670	Far from the Madding Crowd (#2), Unfriended (#3), Two By Two (#7)	
19	10 May 2015	Avengers: Age of Ultron	£3,462,468	Spooks: The Greater Good (#2), The Age of Adaline (#5), Big Game (#7)	
20	17 May 2015	Pitch Perfect 2	£5,005,394	Mad Max: Fury Road (#2)	
21	24 May 2015	Pitch Perfect 2	£2,665,428	Tomorrowland (#3), Poltergeist (#4), Tanu Weds Manu Returns (#9)	
22	31 May 2015	San Andreas	£4,628,394	Man Up (#7), Danny Collins (#10)	
23	7 June 2015	Spy	£2,557,824	Insidious: Chapter 3 (#3) The Empire Strikes Back (#8)	
24	14 June 2015	Jurassic World	£19,350,727	London Road (#8)	
25	21 June 2015	Jurassic World	£11,133,912	Take That Live 2015 (#2), Mr. Holmes (#4), Entourage (#5), The Longest Ride (#7)	
26	28 June 2015	Minions	£11,558,946	Knock, Knock (#7), Slow West (#10)	
27	5 July 2015	Minions	£6,238,498	Terminator Genisys (#2), Magic Mike XXL (#4), Amy (#5), Guillaume Tell: Royal Opera House (#8)	
28	12 July 2015	Minions	£4,154,359	Ted 2 (#2), Love & Mercy (#9), Song of the Sea (#10)	
29	19 July 2015	Ant-Man	£4,011,345	Andre Rieu’s 2015 Maastricht Concert (#5), Bajrangi Bhaijaan (#7), The Gallows (#9)	
30	26 July 2015	Inside Out	£7,376,513	Southpaw (#4)	
31	2 August 2015	Mission: Impossible – Rogue Nation	£5,351,344	Hot Pursuit (#7)	
32	9 August 2015	Fantastic Four	£2,686,176	The Gift (#5)	
33	16 August 2015	Pixels	£2,660,772	The Man from U.N.C.L.E. (#4), Trainwreck (#5), Absolutely Anything (#9)	
34	23 August 2015	Paper Towns	£2,072,789	Sinister 2 (#3), Vacation (#7), The Bad Education Movie (#8)	
35	30 August 2015	Straight Outta Compton	£2,498,231	Hitman: Agent 47 (#3), 45 Years (#10)	
36	6 September 2015	Straight Outta Compton	£1,366,741	No Escape (#3), Me and Earl and the Dying Girl (#5), The Transporter Refueled (#7), American Ultra (#8)	
37	13 September 2015	Legend	£5,189,074	Maze Runner: The Scorch Trials (#2), The Visit (#3), Irrational Man (#10)	
38	20 September 2015	Everest	£3,160,154	A Walk in the Woods (#8), The Battle of Britain at 75 (#9), Bill (#10)	
39	27 September 2015	Everest	£1,996,439	Miss You Already (#4), Solace (#6)	
40	4 October 2015	The Martian	£6,531,734	The Intern (#4), Macbeth (#5), Il Trovatore – Met Opera (#7), Singh Is Bliing (#9)	
41	11 October 2015	The Martian	£3,854,809	Sicario (#2), The Walk (#3), Regression (#9)	
42	18 October 2015	Hotel Transylvania 2	£6,317,438	Suffragette (#2), Pan (#3), Crimson Peak (#5), The Lobster (#9)	
43	25 October 2015	Hotel Transylvania 2	£2,275,612	Paranormal Activity: The Ghost Dimension (#3), The Last Witch Hunter (#5)	
44	1 November 2015	Spectre †	£41,299,090	Tannhauser – Met Opera (#8)	
45	8 November 2015	Spectre †	£13,145,138	Brooklyn (#3), Burnt (#5), Scouts Guide to the Zombie Apocalypse (#8)	
46	15 November 2015	Spectre †	£7,833,891	The Lady in the Van (#2), Prem Ratan Dhan Payo (#4), Steve Jobs (#5)	
47	22 November 2015	The Hunger Games: Mockingjay – Part 2	£11,255,566	The Dressmaker (#7), The Perfect Guy (#10)	
48	29 November 2015	The Hunger Games: Mockingjay – Part 2	£4,534,464	The Good Dinosaur (#2), Bridge of Spies (#4), Black Mass (#5), Carol (#7), Tamasha (#8)	
49	6 December 2015	The Hunger Games: Mockingjay – Part 2	£2,240,723	Christmas With The Coopers (#5), Victor Frankenstein (#8), Krampus (#9)	
50	13 December 2015	The Hunger Games: Mockingjay – Part 2	£1,286,244		
51	20 December 2015	Star Wars: The Force Awakens	£34,041,968	Sisters (#2), Dilwale (#4), Bajirao Mastani (#7)	
52	27 December 2015	Star Wars: The Force Awakens	£10,164,805	Snoopy and Charlie Brown: The Peanuts Movie (#2), Daddy's Home (#3), In The Heart Of The Sea (#4)	

~~1~~ Spectre's opening gross was for a 7-day period, not a weekend, as the film opened on a Monday.

Preceded by 2014	2015	Succeeded by 2016
