= List of 2012 box office number-one films in the United Kingdom =

This is a list of films which have placed number one at the weekend box office in the United Kingdom during 2012.

== Films ==
†	This implies the highest-grossing movie of the year.

Weekend end date	Weekend End Date	Film	Total weekend gross (Pound sterling)	Weekend openings in the Top 10	Reference(s)
1	1 January 2012	Mission: Impossible – Ghost Protocol	£8,188,209	The Girl with the Dragon Tattoo (#2)	
2	8 January 2012	Mission: Impossible – Ghost Protocol	£2,223,200	The Iron Lady (#3), Goon (#7), The Artist (#8)	
3	15 January 2012	War Horse	£3,944,746	The Darkest Hour (#6)	
4	22 January 2012	War Horse	£3,202,493	Haywire (#2), Underworld: Awakening (#3), The Sitter (#6)	
5	29 January 2012	War Horse	£2,081,490	The Descendants (#2), The Grey (#3), A Monster in Paris (#4)	
6	5 February 2012	Chronicle	£2,193,072	Journey 2: The Mysterious Island (#2), Jack and Jill (#5), Man on a Ledge (#6), Carnage (#10)	
7	12 February 2012	The Woman in Black	£3,153,020	The Muppets (#2), Star Wars: Episode I – The Phantom Menace (3D re-release) (#3), The Vow (#4)	
8	19 February 2012	The Woman in Black	£3,501,601	Ghost Rider: Spirit of Vengeance (#3)	
9	26 February 2012	The Woman in Black	£2,432,580	The Best Exotic Marigold Hotel (#2), Safe House (#3), One for the Money (#10)	
10	4 March 2012	The Best Exotic Marigold Hotel	£2,342,095	This Means War (#3), Project X (#6), Wanderlust (#7)	
11	11 March 2012	John Carter	£1,960,414	The Raven (#8), Bel Ami (#9)	
12	18 March 2012	The Devil Inside	£1,988,461	21 Jump Street (#2), We Bought a Zoo (#5), Contraband (#6)	
13	25 March 2012	The Hunger Games	£4,900,177	Act of Valor (#8)	
14	1 April 2012	The Hunger Games	£2,986,317	Wrath of the Titans (#2), The Pirates! In an Adventure with Scientists! (#3), StreetDance 2 (#5), Into the Abyss (#10)	
15	8 April 2012	Titanic 3D	£2,856,540	Mirror Mirror (#3), The Cold Light of Day (#7), Housefull 2 (#10)	
16	15 April 2012	Battleship	£3,763,348	The Cabin in the Woods (#3)	
17	22 April 2012	Battleship	£1,282,091	Salmon Fishing in the Yemen (#2), Lockout (#7), Gone (#10)	
18	29 April 2012	Marvel Avengers Assemble	£15,778,074		
19	6 May 2012	Marvel Avengers Assemble	£8,121,916	American Pie: Reunion (#2), The Lucky One (#3), Beauty and the Beast 3D (#4), Safe (#10)	
20	13 May 2012	Marvel Avengers Assemble	£4,169,087	Dark Shadows (#3), Piranha 3DD (#8), How I Spent My Summer Vacation (#9)	
21	20 May 2012	The Dictator	£4,963,745	The Raid (#5)	
22	27 May 2012	Men in Black 3	£2,953,736	What to Expect When You're Expecting (#4), Moonrise Kingdom (#7), Iron Sky (#10)	
23	3 June 2012	Prometheus	£6,236,580	Snow White and the Huntsman (#2), Top Cat: The Movie (#7), The Angel's Share (#9)	
24	10 June 2012	Prometheus	£3,135,504	The Pact (#4), Ill Manors (#9)	
25	17 June 2012	Prometheus	£2,009,955	Rock of Ages (#4), Red Lights (#6), Fast Girls (#8)	
26	24 June 2012	Abraham Lincoln: Vampire Hunter	£1,119,117	The Five-Year Engagement (#3), Chernobyl Diaries (#7), Teri Meri Kahaani (#9)	
27	1 July 2012	Ice Age 4: Continental Drift	£853,226	Friends with Kids (#7), Killer Joe (#10)	
28	8 July 2012	The Amazing Spider-Man	£11,091,972	Katy Perry: Part of Me (#4), Bol Bachchan (#10)	
29	15 July 2012	Ice Age 4: Continental Drift	£10,087,052	Magic Mike (#3), Seeking a Friend for the End of the World (#4), Cocktail (#5)	
30	22 July 2012	The Dark Knight Rises	£14,362,443		
31	29 July 2012	The Dark Knight Rises	£7,275,558	The Lorax (#2), Searching for Sugar Man (#7), Carry on Jatta (#10)	
32	5 August 2012	Ted	£9,330,700	Diary of a Wimpy Kid: Dog Days (#3), Brave (#6)	
33	12 August 2012	Ted	£3,174,766	Step Up 4: Miami Heat (#3), Offender (#10)	
34	19 August 2012	Brave	£5,269,402	The Bourne Legacy (#2), The Expendables 2 (#4), Ek Tha Tiger (#6), The Wedding Video (#10)	
35	26 August 2012	Brave	£2,371,691	Keith Lemon: The Film (#5), The Three Stooges (#7), The Imposter (#10)	
36	2 September 2012	Total Recall	£2,493,230	The Watch (#2), The Possession (#5)	
37	9 September 2012	Dredd	£1,049,345	Lawless (#2), Anna Karenina (#3)	
38	16 September 2012	The Sweeney	£1,545,294	ParaNorman (#2), Hope Springs (#6)	
39	23 September 2012	ParaNorman	£1,219,194	Killing Them Softly (#2), House at the End of the Street (#3), Savages (#10)	
40	30 September 2012	Looper	£2,427,994	Resident Evil: Retribution (#3), The Campaign (#4), Untouchable (#10)	
41	7 October 2012	Taken 2	£7,378,048	Sinister (#3), The Perks of Being a Wallflower (#4)	
42	14 October 2012	Taken 2	£3,743,046	Hotel Transylvania (#2), Ruby Sparks (#6), On the Road (#7)	
43	21 October 2012	Madagascar 3: Europe's Most Wanted	£6,030,904	Paranormal Activity 4 (#2), Frankenweenie (#6), Beasts of the Southern Wild (#9)	
44	28 October 2012	Skyfall †	£20,180,369		
45	4 November 2012	Skyfall †	£16,107,687	Silent Hill: Revelation (#3), Fun Size (#6), Rust and Bone (#8)	
46	11 November 2012	Skyfall †	£10,447,385	Argo (#3), Here Comes the Boom (#4), The Sapphires (#10)	
47	18 November 2012	The Twilight Saga: Breaking Dawn – Part 2	£15,850,825	Jab Tak Hai Jaan (#4), Son of Sardaar (#8), Thuppakki (#10)	
48	25 November 2012	The Twilight Saga: Breaking Dawn – Part 2	£5,344,598	Nativity 2: Danger in the Manger (#3), Silver Linings Playbook (#4), Gambit (#5), End of Watch (#7)	
49	2 December 2012	Skyfall †	£2,275,469	Rise of the Guardians (#3), Great Expectations (#6), Talaash: The Answer Lies Within (#7)	
50	9 December 2012	Rise of the Guardians	£1,602,689	Seven Psychopaths (#3)	
51	16 December 2012	The Hobbit: An Unexpected Journey	£11,601,538	Tinker Bell and the Secret of the Wings (#5)	
52	23 December 2012	The Hobbit: An Unexpected Journey	£5,979,241	Life of Pi (#2), Pitch Perfect (#5)	
53	30 December 2012	The Hobbit: An Unexpected Journey	£6,850,728	Jack Reacher (#3), Parental Guidance (#5)	

Preceded by 2011	2012	Succeeded by 2013
