= List of 2016 box office number-one films in the United Kingdom =

This is a list of films which have placed number one at the weekend box office in the United Kingdom during 2016.

== Films ==
Week	Weekend End Date	Film	Total weekend gross (Pound sterling)	Weekend openings in the Top 10	Reference(s)
1	3 January 2016	Star Wars: The Force Awakens (Note: Opened in 2015)	£10,304,562	Joy (#3), The Danish Girl (#4)	
2	10 January 2016	Star Wars: The Force Awakens	£6,001,948	The Hateful Eight (#2)	
3	17 January 2016	The Revenant	£5,235,851	Creed (#3), Room (#7)	
4	24 January 2016	The Revenant	£3,856,489	Ride Along 2 (#2), The Big Short (#4), The 5th Wave (#9)	
5	31 January 2016	The Revenant	£2,278,262	Dirty Grandpa (#2), Spotlight (#5), Capture the Flag (#7)	
6	7 February 2016	Goosebumps	£2,686,105	Dad's Army (#2), Point Break (#9)	
7	14 February 2016	Deadpool	£13,729,803	Alvin and the Chipmunks: The Road Chip (#2), Zoolander 2 (#3), Pride and Prejudice and Zombies (#10)	
8	21 February 2016	Deadpool	£5,694,280	How to Be Single (#3), Triple 9 (#6)	
9	28 February 2016	Deadpool	£2,987,877	Grimsby (#2), The Forest (#6)	
10	6 March 2016	London Has Fallen	£3,229,675	Hail, Caesar! (#2), The Other Side of the Door (#6)	
11	13 March 2016	Kung Fu Panda 3	£4,771,131	The Divergent Series: Allegiant (#2), The Witch (#7), Anomalisa (#10)	
12	20 March 2016	Kung Fu Panda 3	£1,740,695	10 Cloverfield Lane (#2), The Boy (#5), High-Rise (#6), Kapoor & Sons (#10)	
13	27 March 2016	Batman v Superman: Dawn of Justice	£14,621,007	Zootropolis (#2), My Big Fat Greek Wedding 2 (#4)	
14	3 April 2016	Batman v Superman: Dawn of Justice	£4,661,959	Eddie the Eagle (#2)	
15	10 April 2016	The Huntsman: Winter's War	£3,032,962	Midnight Special (#6), Hardcore Henry (#10)	
16	17 April 2016	The Jungle Book	£9,901,921	Eye in the Sky (#3), Fan (#7), Theri (#8), Criminal (#9)	
17	24 April 2016	The Jungle Book	£8,895,442	Bastille Day (#3), Friend Request (#5), Miles Ahead (#10)	
18	1 May 2016	Captain America: Civil War	£14,466,681	Demolition (#6), Son of Saul (#8)	
19	8 May 2016	Captain America: Civil War	£4,806,575	Bad Neighbours 2 (#3), Florence Foster Jenkins (#4), Robinson Crusoe (#5), 24 (#10)	
20	15 May 2016	Captain America: Civil War	£2,789,985	The Angry Birds Movie (#2), Our Kind of Traitor (#6), Everybody Wants Some!! (#7), Green Room (#10)	
21	22 May 2016	X-Men: Apocalypse	£7,354,293	A Hologram for the King (#6), Thomas & Friends: The Great Race (#10)	
22	29 May 2016	X-Men: Apocalypse	£2,543,481	Alice Through the Looking Glass (#2), Money Monster (#4), Love and Friendship (#8), Minuscule: Valley of the Lost Ants (#10)	
23	5 June 2016	Warcraft: The Beginning	£3,623,725	Teenage Mutant Ninja Turtles: Out of the Shadows (#2), Me Before You (#3), The Nice Guys (#6), Housefull 3 (#10)	
24	12 June 2016	Me Before You	£1,453,859	The Boss (#7), Mother's Day (#9)	
25	19 June 2016	The Conjuring 2	£4,637,862	Gods of Egypt (#3)	
26	26 June 2016	The Secret Life of Pets	£9,793,723	Independence Day: Resurgence (#2)	
27	3 July 2016	The Secret Life of Pets	£4,739,295	Absolutely Fabulous: The Movie (#2), Central Intelligence (#3)	
28	10 July 2016	The Secret Life of Pets	£3,624,751	The Legend of Tarzan (#2), Now You See Me 2 (#3), Sultan (#6), The Neon Demon (#9)	
29	17 July 2016	Ghostbusters	£4,388,944	Ice Age: Collision Course (#2), Dirty Dancing (#6)	
30	24 July 2016	The BFG	£5,288,529	Star Trek Beyond (#2), Andre Rieu's 2016 Maastricht Concert (#3)	
31	31 July 2016	Finding Dory	£8,122,075	Jason Bourne (#2), Dishoom (#10)	
32	7 August 2016	Suicide Squad	£11,252,225		
33	14 August 2016	Suicide Squad	£4,241,598	Mike and Dave Need Wedding Dates (#5), Pete's Dragon (#6), Nerve (#7), The Shallows (#8)	
34	21 August 2016	Finding Dory	£2,868,459	David Brent: Life on the Road (#3), Lights Out (#6), Swallows and Amazons (#8), Nine Lives (#9)	
35	28 August 2016	Finding Dory	£1,932,155	Bad Moms (#2), War Dogs (#4), The Purge: Election Year (#5), Mechanic: Resurrection (#10)	
36	4 September 2016	Sausage Party	£2,690,156	Brotherhood (#2), Café Society (#9)	
37	11 September 2016	Sausage Party	£1,219,972	Ben-Hur (#2), Don't Breathe (#3), Kubo and the Two Strings (#5), Hell Or High Water (#7)	
38	18 September 2016	Bridget Jones's Baby	£8,013,318	Blair Witch (#2), The Beatles: Eight Days a Week (#3), The Infiltrator (#9)	
39	25 September 2016	Bridget Jones's Baby	£6,453,799	The Magnificent Seven (#2), The Girl with All the Gifts (#5)	
40	2 October 2016	Bridget Jones's Baby	£4,807,165	Miss Peregrine's Home for Peculiar Children (#2), Deepwater Horizon, (#3) Supersonic (#5), M.S. Dhoni: The Untold Story (#10)	
41	9 October 2016	The Girl on the Train	£6,957,945	War on Everyone (#7), Tristan Und Isolde – Met Opera (#8)	
42	16 October 2016	The Girl on the Train	£3,412,472	Inferno (#2), Storks (#3), Miss Saigon: 25th Anniversary Performance (#4), American Honey (#10)	
43	23 October 2016	Trolls	£5,440,878	Jack Reacher: Never Go Back (#2), Ouija: Origin of Evil (#6), I, Daniel Blake (#9), Keeping Up with the Joneses (#10)	
44	30 October 2016	Doctor Strange	£9,288,898	Ae Dil Hai Mushkil (#8)	
45	6 November 2016	Doctor Strange	£3,445,203	The Accountant (#3), A Street Cat Named Bob (#4), Nocturnal Animals (#5), The Light Between Oceans (#6)	
46	13 November 2016	Arrival	£2,924,059		
47	20 November 2016	Fantastic Beasts and Where to Find Them	£15,333,146	André Rieu:Christmas with André (#4)	
48	27 November 2016	Fantastic Beasts and Where to Find Them	£8,892,489	A United Kingdom (#6), Dear Zindagi (#9), Paterson (#10)	
49	4 December 2016	Fantastic Beasts and Where to Find Them	£4,494,727	Moana (#2), Sully: Miracle on the Hudson (#3), Pitbull: Tough Women (#5), The Edge of Seventeen (#9), Bleed for This (#10)	
50	11 December 2016	Fantastic Beasts and Where to Find Them	£2,734,960	Office Christmas Party (#4), Snowden (#8), Befikre (#10)	
51	18 December 2016	Rogue One: A Star Wars Story	£17,305,011	The Nutcracker - Bolshoi Ballet (#7)	
52	25 December 2016	Rogue One: A Star Wars Story	£5,634,115	Passengers (#2), Ballerina (#8), Dangal (#9)	

== Notes ==
Preceded by 2015	2016	Succeeded by 2017
