= List of 2018 box office number-one films in the United Kingdom =

This is a list of films which have placed number one at the weekend box office in the United Kingdom during 2018.

== Films ==
†	This implies the highest-grossing movie of the year.

Week	Weekend End Date	Film	Total weekend gross (Pound sterling)	Weekend openings in the Top 10	Reference(s)
1	7 January 2018	Jumanji: Welcome to the Jungle (Note: Opened in 2017)	£3,895,450	Molly's Game (#4), All the Money in the World (#6), Hostiles (#9)	
2	14 January 2018	Darkest Hour	£4,058,356	Three Billboards Outside Ebbing, Missouri (#3), Insidious: The Last Key (#5)	
3	21 January 2018	Coco	£5,209,214	The Post (#3), The Commuter (#7)	
4	28 January 2018	Darkest Hour	£2,672,022	Maze Runner: The Death Cure (#3), Early Man (#5), Downsizing (#9), Padmaavat (#10)	
5	4 February 2018	The Greatest Showman	£2,201,523	Den of Thieves (#6), Phantom Thread (#10)	
6	11 February 2018	Fifty Shades Freed	£6,132,414		
7	18 February 2018	Black Panther	£17,700,000	The Shape of Water (#3)	
8	25 February 2018	Black Panther	£6,859,230	Lady Bird (#3), I, Tonya (#5), Finding Your Feet (#6)	
9	4 March 2018	Black Panther	£3,736,954	Red Sparrow (#2), Game Night (#4), Kobiety Mafii (#6)	
10	11 March 2018	Black Panther	£2,931,682		
11	18 March 2018	Peter Rabbit	£7,237,207	Tomb Raider (#2), My Generation (#10)	
12	25 March 2018	Peter Rabbit	£4,595,239	Pacific Rim Uprising (#2), A Wrinkle in Time (#6), Unsane (#7), Secret Cinema: Blade Runner: The Final Cut (#8)	
13	1 April 2018	Peter Rabbit	£5,610,556	Ready Player One (#2), Isle of Dogs (#3), Blockers (#4), Duck Duck Goose (#8)	
14	8 April 2018	Peter Rabbit	£3,152,269	A Quiet Place (#2), Love, Simon (#4), Ghost Stories (#8)	
15	15 April 2018	Rampage	£4,109,247	Truth or Dare (#5)	
16	22 April 2018	Rampage	£1,413,973	The Guernsey Literary and Potato Peel Pie Society (#3)	
17	29 April 2018	Avengers: Infinity War †	£29,379,496	Cendrillon – Met Opera (#9)	
18	6 May 2018	Avengers: Infinity War †	£10,143,580	I Feel Pretty (#2), The Strangers: Prey at Night (#7), Tully (#8), Mary and the Witch's Flower (#10)	
19	13 May 2018	Avengers: Infinity War †	£5,706,170	Sherlock Gnomes (#2), Life of the Party (#4), Breaking In (#5), Raazi (#10)	
20	20 May 2018	Deadpool 2	£12,974,669	An American in Paris - The Musical (#10)	
21	27 May 2018	Solo: A Star Wars Story	£6,061,231	Show Dogs (#5), On Chesil Beach (#8) (Note: On Chesil Beach charted at #11 for week ending 20 May 2018, before entering the top ten in its second week.)	
22	3 June 2018	Solo: A Star Wars Story	£3,147,338	Book Club (#5), Veere Di Wedding (#9)	
23	10 June 2018	Jurassic World: Fallen Kingdom	£14,334,894	Kaala (#9), McQueen (#10)	
24	17 June 2018	Jurassic World: Fallen Kingdom	£7,220,952	Hereditary (#2), Race 3 (#5)	
25	24 June 2018	Ocean's 8	£4,347,070		
26	1 July 2018	Jurassic World: Fallen Kingdom	£2,001,876	Sicario 2: Soldado (#3), Tag (#4), Sanju (#5), Adrift (#7), Patrick (#8)	
27	8 July 2018	The First Purge	£1,778,157	Yellow Submarine (Note: Yellow Submarine, originally released in 1968, was re-released this week for the 50th anniversary.) (#10)	
28	15 July 2018	Incredibles 2	£9,650,000	Skyscraper (#2), The Secret of Marrowbone (#6)	
29	22 July 2018	Mamma Mia! Here We Go Again	£9,735,931	Hotel Artemis (#6), Spitfire (#8), Thomas & Friends: Big World! Big Adventures! The Movie (#9), Dhadak (#10)	
30	29 July 2018	Mission: Impossible – Fallout	£7,300,103	Hotel Transylvania 3: A Monster Vacation (#4), André Rieu's 2018 Maastricht Concert: Amore, My Tribute to Love (#5)	
31	5 August 2018	Ant-Man and the Wasp	£4,988,747	Teen Titans Go! To the Movies (#6)	
32	12 August 2018	The Meg	£3,651,111	The Darkest Minds (#7), Unfriended: Dark Web (#9)	
33	19 August 2018	Christopher Robin	£2,553,810	The Equalizer 2 (#4), The Festival (#5), Secret Cinema: Romeo + Juliet (#9)	
34	26 August 2018	Christopher Robin	£2,138,824	BlacKkKlansman (#6), The Spy Who Dumped Me (#7)	
35	2 September 2018	Christopher Robin	£1,173,235	Searching (#5), The Happytime Murders (#7)	
36	9 September 2018	The Nun	£4,098,198	Black '47 (#10)	
37	16 September 2018	The Predator	£2,394,163	Crazy Rich Asians (#3), King of Thieves (#4)	
38	23 September 2018	The House with a Clock in Its Walls	£3,370,591	A Simple Favour (#2), Mile 22 (#6)	
39	30 September 2018	Night School	£1,596,378	The Wife (#7)	
40	7 October 2018	Venom	£8,031,342	Johnny English Strikes Again (#2), A Star Is Born (#3), Aida – Met Opera (#7)	
41	14 October 2018	A Star Is Born	£3,083,089	First Man (#4), Smallfoot (#5), Cliff Richard Live: 60th Anniversary Tour (#6), Kler (#7), Bad Times at the El Royale (#8)	
42	21 October 2018	A Star Is Born	£2,883,000	Halloween (#2), Goosebumps 2: Haunted Halloween (#3), Hunter Killer (#8), Samson et Dalila – Met Opera (#9)	
43	28 October 2018	Bohemian Rhapsody	£9,530,463	The Hate U Give (#7), La Fanciulla del West – Met Opera (#10)	
44	4 November 2018	Bohemian Rhapsody	£5,750,267	The Nutcracker and the Four Realms (#3), Slaughterhouse Rulez (#9), Peterloo (#10)	
45	11 November 2018	The Grinch	£5,019,677	Widows (#3), Overlord (#6), Thugs of Hindostan (#7), Sarkar (#9)	
46	18 November 2018	Fantastic Beasts: The Crimes of Grindelwald	£12,318,966	Burn the Stage: The Movie (#8), Suspiria (#9)	
47	25 November 2018	Fantastic Beasts: The Crimes of Grindelwald	£5,622,755	Robin Hood (#4), Nativity Rocks! (#5), The Girl in the Spider's Web (#6), Planeta Singli 2 (#10)	
48	2 December 2018	Ralph Breaks the Internet	£4,032,775	Creed II (#2), 2.0 (#6)	
49	9 December 2018	Ralph Breaks the Internet	£2,446,583	The Old Man & the Gun (#7), Sorry to Bother You (#8), The Nutcracker – Royal Opera House (#9)	
50	16 December 2018	Aquaman	£5,230,285	Spider-Man: Into the Spider-Verse (#2), Mortal Engines (#5), Free Solo (#9), La traviata - Met Opera (#10)	
51	23 December 2018	Mary Poppins Returns	£8,181,541	Zero (#9)	
52	30 December 2018	Mary Poppins Returns	£7,441,687	Bumblebee (#2), Holmes & Watson (#4)	

== Notes ==
Preceded by 2017	2018	Succeeded by 2019
