= Out of Our Heads (Take That song) =

Single by Take That

from the album Odyssey
- Released: 11 October 2018
- Genre: Pop/Jazz
- Length: 2:52
- Label: Polydor
- Songwriter(s): Gary Barlow; Howard Donald; Mark Owen
- Producer(s): Stuart Price

Take That singles chronology
"Pray (Odyssey version)" (2018)	"Out of Our Heads" (2018)	"Greatest Day (Robin Schulz Rework)" (2023)

Music video
- "Take That - Out Of Our Heads (Official Video)" on YouTube

"Out of Our Heads" is a song recorded by English band Take That. It was released as a digital download and for streaming through Polydor Records on 11 October 2018 as the second single from their compilation album, Odyssey. The song was written by Gary Barlow, Howard Donald and Mark Owen, and produced by Stuart Price.

== Critical reception ==
Clash gave a positive review of the song stating, "A personal highlight is 'Out of our Heads', as Barlow and co pay homage to the jumpin-jazz era of the 50s." It is described as being a favourable cross between Paolo Nutini and Ray Charles.

== Live performances ==
- Strictly Come Dancing (18 November 2018)

== Music video ==
A music video to accompany the release of "Out of Our Heads" was first released onto YouTube on 2 November 2018 at a total length of two minutes and fifty-seven seconds.

== Personnel ==
- Gary Barlow – lead vocals
- Howard Donald – backing vocals
- Mark Owen – backing vocals

== Charts ==
Chart (2018)	Peak position
Belgium (Ultratip Bubbling Under Flanders)	30
Scotland (OCC)	23
UK Singles Downloads (OCC)	25
UK Singles Sales (OCC)	26
