= Ava Leigh =

British singer (born 1985)

- Born: Hayley Carline; 22 November 1985 (age 40)
- Origin: Chester, England
- Genres: Reggae, reggae fusion
- Occupations: Singer, songwriter
- Years active: 2008–present
- Label: Virgin
- Website: avaleighofficial.com

Hayley Carline (born 22 November 1985), better known as Ava Leigh, is an English reggae singer.

== Career ==
Leigh's career first began when she started performing with her school's jazz band. In her mid-teens, she acquired a manager, and tried out for a variety of labels, singing R&B. However, Leigh realised that the genre "never, ever worked" for her. Leigh, in an interview with The Telegraph, attributed her mother for first getting her into reggae: "How I got into reggae ... was from my mother listening to it. She was a big fan of [the British reggae subgenre] lover's rock. When I was about nine or 10, I remember hearing "Silly Games" by Janet Kay, with all those high notes, and thinking, "Hmm, I wonder if I can do that?".

In 2008, Leigh stated that she hoped to become part of a musical movement bringing singers (as opposed to dancehall deejays) back to the forefront in reggae. As she told noted writer Pete Lewis of Blues & Soul: I think the reason we're now living in the decade of dancehall deejays is because everyone these days is so into hip hop and rap, and dancehall is basically the reggae version of that. But hopefully me doing this can help signal the start of many more successful new reggae vocalists to come."

Leigh worked with writers such as Nick Manasseh, Future Cut and Sher Agha (Shai Sevin) on her debut album, originally to be titled Turned on Underground. Partly recorded at Harry J's in Jamaica, the album was reviewed favourably and was described as having the "slick appeal of a US R&B princess." The album was released as a promo CD titled Rollin' but never received a full release after the singles "La La La" and "Mad About the Boy" did not achieve commercial success. Leigh released a four-track extended play (EP) of recordings from the album titled La La La, on 5 January 2009.

Leigh's song "Mad About the Boy" was featured in the film Angus, Thongs and Perfect Snogging, and her version of "Mas Que Nada" was featured in a 2008 TV commercial for chain store Next's summer clothing range. In 2008, Leigh co-wrote Joss Stone's digital download single "Governmentalist", featuring Nas.

== Discography ==
Studio albums

- Rollin' (unreleased; full album promo available 2008)

Extended plays

- iTunes Live: London Festival '08 (2008)
- La La La (2009)

Singles

Year	Single	UK chart position	Album
2007	"La La La"	—	Rollin'
2008	"Mad About the Boy" ^{[A]}	128	Rollin'

Notes

- A Released as a double-A side single with "Mas Que Nada" in some retailers.
