= Giants (Take That song) =

Single by Take That

from the album Wonderland
- B-side: "Loving or Leaving"
- Released: 17 February 2017
- Recorded: Abbey Road Studios, Metropolis Studios (London)
- Genre: Pop
- Length: 3:53
- Label: Polydor
- Songwriters: Gary Barlow; Howard Donald; Mark Owen; Jamie Norton; Ben Mark
- Producer: Mark Ralph

Take That singles chronology
"Cry" (2016)	"Giants" (2017)	"New Day" (2017)

Music video
- Giants on YouTube

"Giants" is a song recorded by English band Take That for their eighth studio album, Wonderland (2017). It was written by Gary Barlow, Howard Donald, Mark Owen, Jamie Norton and Ben Mark, while the production was done by Mark Ralph. It was released as the lead single from Wonderland on 17 February 2017 through Polydor Records.

== Background and release ==
The lead single from the album, titled "Giants", was released on 17 February 2017. It was written by Gary Barlow, Howard Donald, Mark Owen, Jamie Norton and Ben Mark.

The production of the song was handled by Mark Ralph, who had previously produced songs for Clean Bandit and Years & Years. In addition, Ralph also provided the bass, guitars, synthesizers and the programming. Drew Smith and Tom AD Fuller, served as the song's engineers, whilst Charlie Russel did the additional engineering and the keys programming. Fuller also provided additional backing vocals alongside Geoff Holroyde. The mixing of "Giants" was done by Mark "Spike" Stent, with Geoff Swan serving as the mixing assistant. The strings were recorded at the Abbey Road Studios in London. Will Malone was the string arranger and conductor whilst Perry Montague-Mason was the string leader. Isobel Griffiths served as conductor and Susie Gillis provided assistance in the process. Tim Young did the mastering at the Metropolis Studios in London.

== Critical reception ==
In his review of the song, Nicholas Reilly of the British newspaper Metro called it "ready-made for arenas" and stated, "It’s a welcome return to their penchant for huge choruses that are tailor made for cavernous arenas. It’s also got a damn catchy chorus too that wouldn't be too far out of place on a recent Coldplay album."

== Music video ==
The song's music video was directed by Mat Whitecross.

== Chart performance ==
The single debuted at 13 in the UK, becoming Take That's 24th UK top 20 single. However, it was the week's highest selling physical release. It performed well on the Scottish charts, entering the top 10 at number 6, whilst it also reached 86 on the Irish chart.

== Credits and personnel ==
Credits adapted from "Giants" physical CD single.

Locations

- Strings recorded at Abbey Road Studios in London
- Mastering at Metropolis Studios in London

Personnel

- Gary Barlow – vocals, writing
- Howard Donald – vocals, writing
- Mark Owen – vocals, writing
- Mark Ralph – production, bass, guitars, synthesizers, programming
- Jamie Norton – writing
- Ben Mark – writing
- Drew Smith – engineering
- Tom AD Fuller – engineering, backing vocals
- Charlie Russel – additional engineering, keys programming
- Mark "Spike" Stent – mixing
- Geoff Swan – mixing assistant
- Will Malone – strings arranger and conductor
- Perry Montague-Mason – string leader
- Isobel Griffiths – string contractor
- Susie Gillis – assistant string contractor
- Tim Young – mastering
- Geoff Holroyde – backing vocals, drums

== Charts ==
Chart (2017)	Peak position
Ireland (IRMA)	86
Scotland Singles (OCC)	6
UK Singles (OCC)	13

== Certifications ==
Region	Certification	Certified units/sales
United Kingdom (BPI)	Silver	200,000^{‡}
^{‡} Sales+streaming figures based on certification alone.
