= Cry (Sigma song) =

Drum and bass song from 2016

Single by Sigma featuring Take That

from the album Wonderland (deluxe edition)
- Released: 20 May 2016
- Recorded: 2015
- Genre: Drum and bass
- Length: 3:17
- Label: 3Beat
- Songwriters: Matt Furmidge; Dom Liu; Sean Mac; Chiara Hunter; Gary Barlow; Mark Owen; Howard Donald; Cameron Edwards; Joseph Lenzie
- Producer: Sigma

Sigma singles chronology
"Nightingale" (2016)	"Cry" (2016)	"Find Me" (2016)

Take That singles chronology
"Hey Boy" (2015)	"Cry" (2016)	"Giants" (2017)

Music video
- "Cry" on YouTube

"Cry" is a song performed by British drum and bass duo Sigma featuring vocals from English pop group Take That (lead vocals by Gary Barlow). The song was released as a digital download on 20 May 2016, through 3 Beat Records. The song peaked at number 21 on the UK Singles Chart and is included on the deluxe edition of Take That's eighth studio album, Wonderland (2017).

== Critical reception ==
Official Charts labelled the collaboration a "fists-in-the-sky anthem." Heat World stated that the track proved "the lads can still Take That & Party with the best of 'em."

== Music video ==
A music video to accompany the release of "Cry" was first released onto YouTube on 28 May 2016 at a total length of three minutes and twenty-eight seconds. The full music video was filmed in and around the Arena Essex Raceway.

== Track listing ==
Digital download
No.	Title	Length
1.	"Cry" (featuring Take That)	3:17

== Credits and personnel ==
- Songwriting – Matt Furmidge, Dominic Joshua Alexander Liu, Sean Michael McDonagh, Chiara Hunter, Gary William Barlow, Mark Anthony Owen, Howard Paul Donald, Cameron James Edwards, Joseph Aluin Lenzie
- Production – Cameron Edwards, Joseph Lenzie
- Keyboards – Matt Furmidge, Dominic Joshua Alexander Liu
- Strings – Rosie Danvers
- Vocals – Gary Barlow, Mark Owen, Howard Donald

Credits adapted from liner notes.

== Chart performance ==
=== Weekly charts ===
Chart (2016)	Peak position
Belgium Dance (Ultratop Flanders)	27
Czech Republic Airplay (ČNS IFPI)	76
Global LyricFind Songs (Billboard)	12
Hungary (Single Top 40)	20
Hungary (Rádiós Top 40)	1
Ireland (IRMA)	65
Scottish Singles Sales (Official Charts)	6
UK Singles (Official Charts)	21

=== Year-end charts ===
Chart (2016)	Position
Hungary (Rádiós Top 40)	38

== Certifications ==
Region	Certification	Certified units/sales
United Kingdom (BPI)	Silver	200,000^{‡}
^{‡} Sales+streaming figures based on certification alone.

== Release history ==
Region	Date	Format	Label
United Kingdom	20 May 2016	Digital download	3Beat
