= Cultural impact of Taylor Swift =

Influence of American singer-songwriter

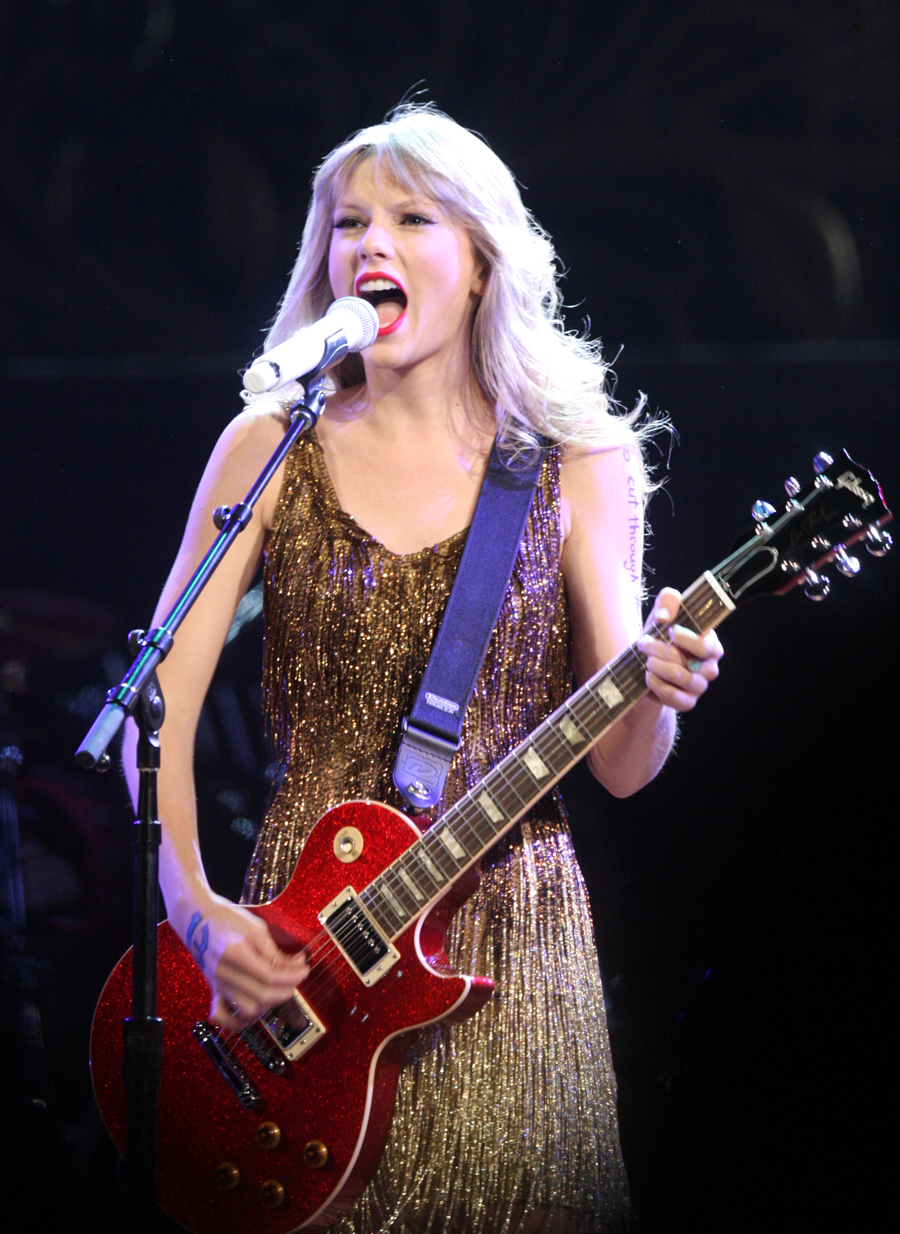
Several authors and publications consider Taylor Swift a culturally significant music artist. (Note: Attributed to Burt, Cartwright, Dunn, Jericho, Lansky, McGrath, Molanphy, Politi, Sisario, Unterberger, Yahr, Yang, et cetera.)

The American singer-songwriter Taylor Swift has influenced popular culture, music, and economics with her artistry, performances, image, politics, fashion, ideas, and actions, collectively referred to as the Taylor Swift effect by publications. Debuting as a 16-year-old independent singer-songwriter in 2006, Swift steadily amassed fame, success, and public curiosity in her career, becoming a global monocultural figure.

Often described by authors as the most prominent celebrity of the 21st-century, Swift is the only artist across all fields of art to have been named Person of the Year by Time. She started in country music, reshaping the genre's appeal and extending its reach to the untapped markets of Asia. She then ventured into pop, expanding the genre's perceived artistic boundaries by emphasizing emotional engagement without forfeiting chart success. Electronic, folk, and rock styles were explored in her subsequent releases, blurring music genre boundaries. Swift's expansive career has led critics to describe her as a rare combination of chart success, critical acclaim, and intense fan support, resulting in her wide impact on and beyond the music industry. She is recognized for her versatile musicality, songwriting expertise, and sharp entrepreneurial sense, as well as an American cultural symbol. She replaced the Beatles as the most covered artist of the world.

From the end of the album era to the rise of the Internet, Swift has influenced music distribution, perception, and consumption across the 2000s, 2010s, and 2020s, and has used social media to spotlight issues within the industry and society at large. Wielding strong economic and political leverage, she prompted reforms to recording, streaming, and distribution structures for greater artists' rights, increased awareness of creative ownership in terms of masters and intellectual property, and has led the vinyl revival. Her consistent commercial success is considered unprecedented by journalists, with simultaneous achievements in album sales, digital sales, streaming, airplay, vinyl sales, record charts, and touring. Bloomberg Businessweek stated Swift is "The Music Industry", one of her many honorific sobriquets. Billboard described Swift as "an advocate, a style icon, a marketing wiz, a prolific songwriter, a pusher of visual boundaries and a record-breaking road warrior". Her album promotional cycles, known as "eras", have influenced mass media trends and culminated in the Eras Tour (2023–2024), which made its own impact.

One of the most discussed writers of the 21st-century, Swift is a subject of academic research, media studies, and cultural analysis, generally focused on concepts of poptimism, feminism, capitalism, internet culture, celebrity culture, consumerism, post-postmodernism, and other sociomusicological phenomena. Various academic institutions offer courses on her and museums have exhibited her artifacts. Scholars have attributed Swift's cultural omnipresence to her musical sensibility, artistic integrity, global engagement, intergenerational appeal, and marketing acumen. Apart from inspiring musicians, Swift has also influenced filmmakers, actors, authors, entrepreneurs, and legislators. Several journalists have used the adjective "Swiftian" to describe works reminiscent of Swift's. Scientists have named six animal species after her.

== Fame and stardom ==
Taylor Swift is one of the highest-selling music artists of all time. She is the richest female musician and the first-ever billionaire whose income is mainly from music (US$2,000,000,000, as of 2026). She has released 12 studio albums and four re-recorded albums, supported by a number of singles, in addition to her non-album songs and collaborations. All of her albums were commercially lucrative and positively received by music critics. Billboard noted that only a handful of artists have had Swift's trifecta of chart success, critical acclaim, and fan support, resulting in her widespread impact.

i-D notes Swift's popularity and longevity as the kind of "ceaseless" fame and "global influence" unseen since the 20th century. In 2009, Rolling Stone journalist Vannessa Grigoriadis wrote about Swift—"The world's biggest new pop star is a little bit country, a little bit rock & roll". To CNN, Swift began the 2010s decade as a country star and ended it as an "all-time musical titan". New York's Jody Rosen and Chicago Tribune's Steve Chapman called Swift the world's biggest pop star and music star, respectively, leaving her peers "vying for second place", as per Rosen. Elle and Fortune have described Swift as "pop megastar at celestial echelons" and "the world's greatest female leader", respectively.

=== Historical position ===
Journalists name Swift among the most culturally influential artists of all time. In 2022, The Guardian columnist Greg Jericho said Swift had a "cultural vitality" whose consistent popularity, accentuated by the era of internet, surpassed that of the Rolling Stones, Bob Dylan, David Bowie, Bruce Springsteen and U2. All four had struggled to retain their cultural significance this far into their careers, whereas Swift continued to find success in the 18th year of hers with her tenth studio album, Midnights (2022). Jericho stated that only Drake, Kanye West and Beyoncé could compete with Swift in terms of popularity, based on Spotify streams: "even Beyoncé doesn't have the popularity of Swift; among women artists, Swift is miles in front."

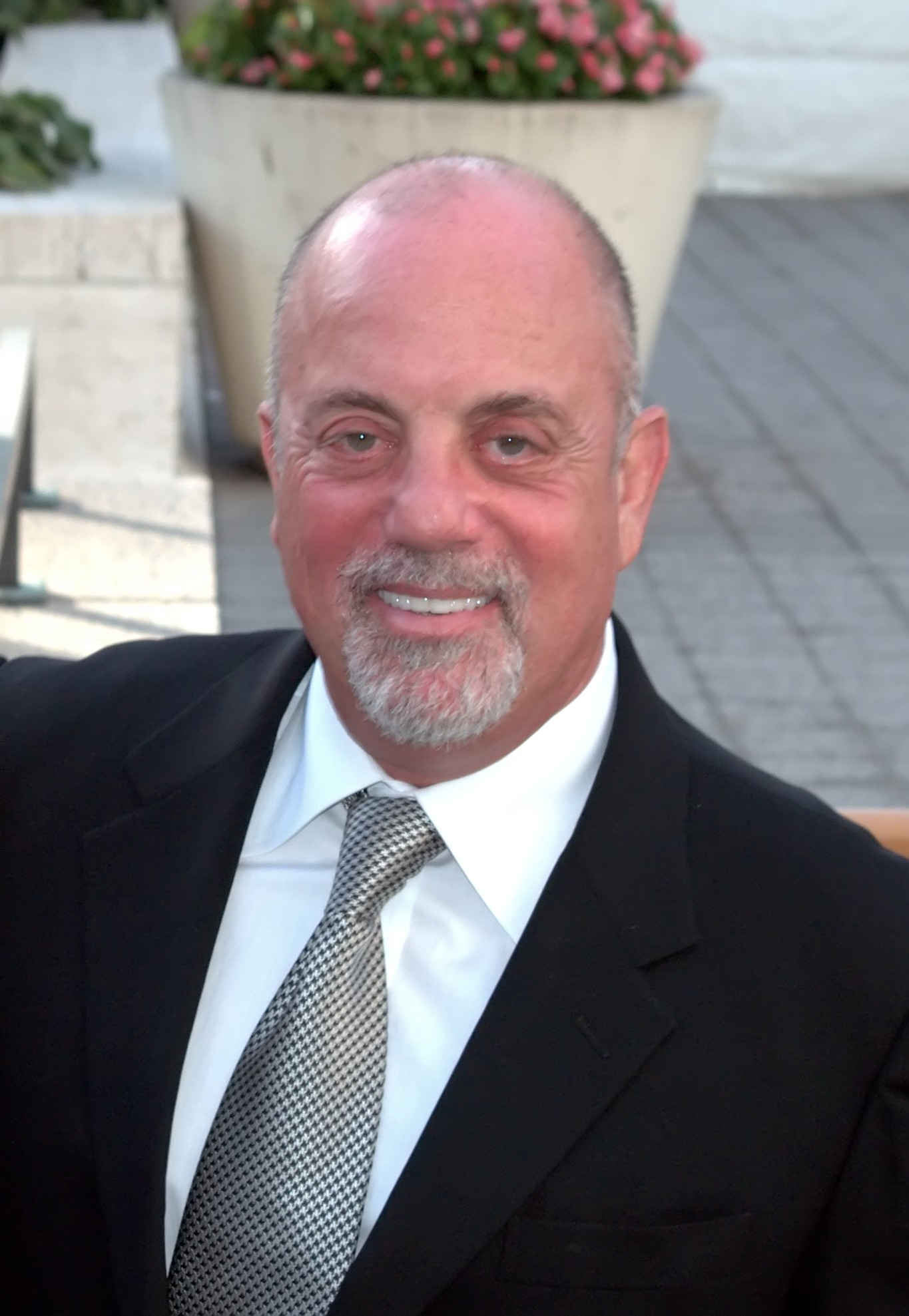
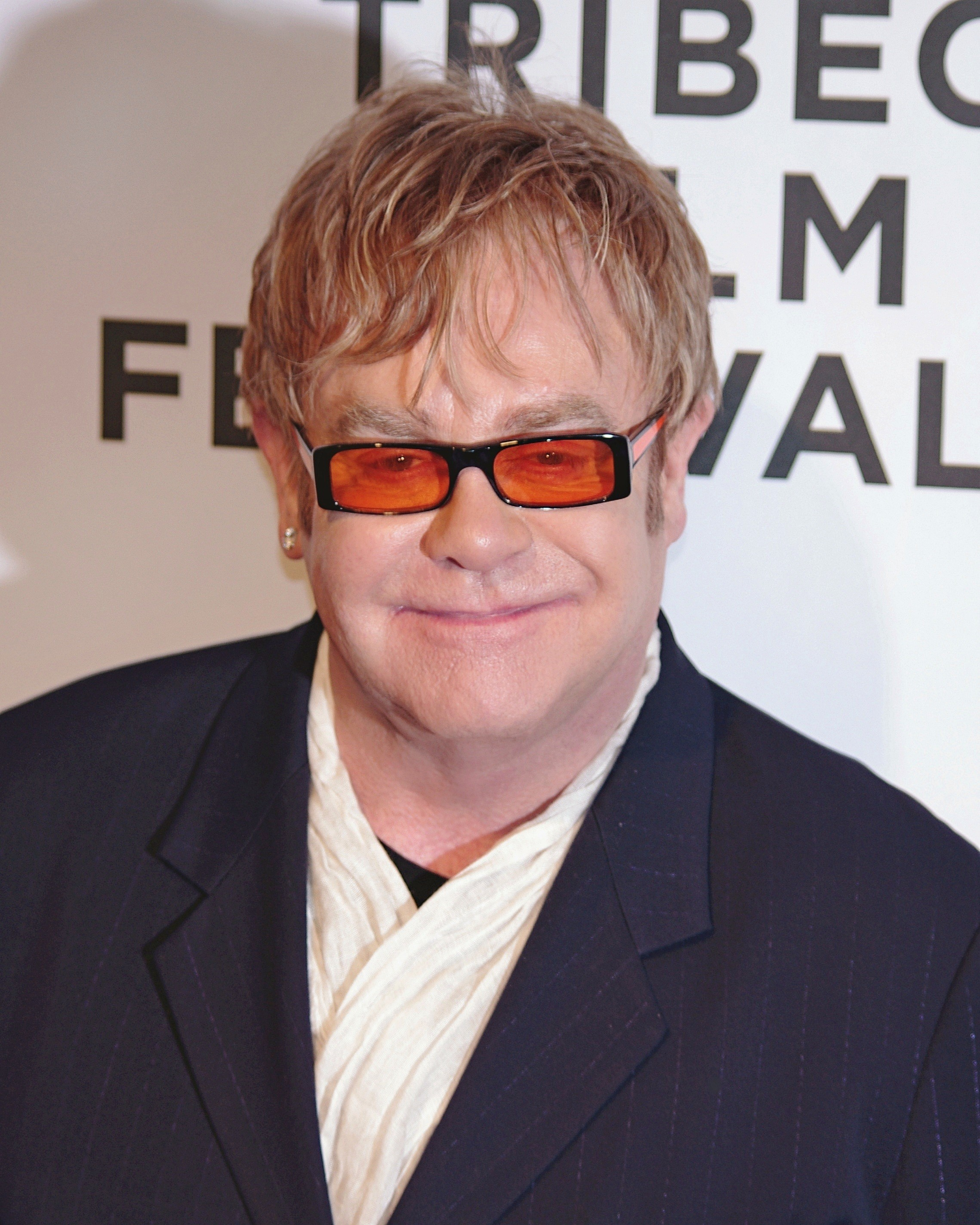
Classic rock musicians like Billy Joel (left) and Elton John (right) compared Swift to the Beatles.

Her fame has been compared to that of the Beatles, Michael Jackson, and Madonna. Chris Molanphy of Slate stated that Swift's career has lasted longer than that of the Beatles, breaking the band's once-deemed "unbeatable" records. Musicians Billy Joel, Elton John, and Gene Simmons of Kiss compared Swift's fame to Beatlemania; Dolly Parton opined that Swift is a phenomenon "nothing like [she has] ever seen". The New York Times author Ben Sisario felt Swift's cultural dominance competes with Jackson and Madonna in the 1980s, calling it something the "entertainment business had largely accepted as impossible to replicate in the fragmented 21st century." Critics, including Sam Lansky of Time, consider Swift one of the last monocultural entities in the world. Kyle Chayka of The New Yorker felt Swift is a heroic figure like Napoleon and Julius Caesar, all of whom are "agents of the world-spirit" and symbolic of their respective periods in time.

Swift has been placed in various lists that discuss cultural impact. Time included her on its 2010, 2015 and 2019 rankings of the 100 most influential people. In 2014, she was named to Forbes's 30 Under 30 list in the music category. Swift became the youngest woman to be included on Forbes's list of the 100 most powerful women in 2015, ranked at number 64, and the first entertainer to ever place in the list's top five in 2023. She was the most googled woman in 2019 and musician in 2022, as well as the most googled songwriter of all time, and The Guardian named her the most powerful woman in U.K. media. Media outlets noted that she reached a new zenith of fame in 2023, with Glamour saying she "has officially taken over every aspect of popular culture."

=== Social contagion ===
Taylor Swift is the biggest thing going in the entertainment industry. Turn on the TV or radio, scroll social media, listen to talk on the street, and there she is.

— Journalist Shirley McMarlin, Pittsburgh Tribune-Review

Within celebrity culture, Swift's music, life, and image are points of attention. Swift became a teen idol upon the release of her eponymous debut studio album in 2006, and has since become a dominant figure in popular culture, often referred to as a pop icon or diva. Gayle Pamerleau of the University of Pittsburgh at Greensburg credited globalization for Swift's fame and called her a social contagion benefitting "from existing in a time of 24-hour, global connectedness, when everybody knows what everyone else is thinking and doing." Los Angeles Times remarked, Swift "is patient zero for emotional contagion". The Ringer's Kate Knibbs called Swift inescapable as her music saturates "deep into the tissue of contemporary public life whether we like it or not." Hence, Swift's career choices result in reforms in the music industry. In a 2016 article, Billboard opined that despite having had only a decade-old career, Swift had shown an "undeniable" cultural impact.

Others dubbed Swift a source of culture. Kirsty Fairclough of the University of Salford dubbed Swift "the center of the cultural universe." Billboard journalists felt that "her presence in popular music is the same as popular music itself. She's firing on all cylinders, across multiple mediums and eras, and has zero peers on her level", whereas News.com.au asserted "there hasn't probably been anyone on the planet as culturally significant as Swift ever." Writing for CNN, Scottie Andrew felt that "whenever there's a lull in the cultural discourse", Swift becomes the topic of focus. Billie Schwab Dunn of Newsweek remarked, "Swift has dominated the marketplace, a large portion of the cultural zeitgeist and media attention like no other artist before her". Describing a critical consensus, writer Jeff Yang said Swift is "increasingly being spoken about as an economic force of nature, a transformative creator advocate, organizer and innovator and arguably the most influential and even the most powerful figure in the music industry."

The New York Times argued in 2026 that Swift has transcended mere celebrity status, evolving into a self-sustaining "cultural ecosystem", where her life inspires immense economic and media events, mobilizing a vast network of fans, brands, and analysts who actively participate in and profit from her cultural relevance. In agreement, professors Amit Nigam, Danielle Logue, and John Amis of University of London, University of New South Wales, and University of Edinburgh respectively, also proposed that Swift surpassed celebrity, becoming an influential institution in her own right, as a fulcrum for "rules, roles, relationships and meanings that are used to govern aspects of the lives of millions of people around the world" in a much shorter timeframe than the British monarchy did.

==== Cross-cultural effect ====
So much of the Taylor Swift phenomenon is how woven she is into the fabric of peoples' lives. Families with multiple generations of fans. Inside jokes that work for an audience of millions. She's a reference, she's a punch line, she's a historical text.

— Music critic Nora Princiotti, The Ringer

Critics have opined that Swift affects all facets of culture. In attempting to define and analyze her impact on various fields, a number of publications have generally termed it the "Taylor Swift effect". Marcus Collins, professor of marketing at the University of Michigan Ross School of Business, described the effect as a network effect. He said that Swift's stature is "such that when she does something people follow [...] She's influencing a group of people and those people are influencing each other and other people. There's a network effect that's at play." Chris Bibey, in Yahoo! Finance, opined the Taylor Swift effect "could have an impact on your future business and investing endeavors" irrespective of one's own interest in Swift. Various phenomena have been attributed to the effect, such as:

- The upsurge in guitar sales to women, a previously ignored demographic, following Swift's image as a female guitarist and her affinity for guitar in her performances.
- The record-setting voter registrations reported whenever Swift encouraged her followers to register as voters via social media.
- The consumerist phenomenon of purchasing any product or service related even peripherally to Swift.
- The increased legal attention towards the machinery of the music industry and recording contracts.
- The economic enrichment or "wide financial halo", in the words of Forbes, that Swift casts on places she visits, especially on tours, and the open requests from politicians and heads of government to Swift, asking her to tour territories under their jurisdiction.
- The significant increase in viewership and brand value that media franchises, television programs, and sports organizations enjoy following Swift's engagement with them; Swift has had a visible impact on the popularity of American football, and the small businesses of Kansas City following her relationship with Kelce. Circuit of the Americas Chairman Bobby Epstein credited Swift with helping "save" the Formula One United States Grand Prix following her headlining performance there in 2016.
- The string of law bills passed or drafted by legislatures, inspired by Swift.
- The vinyl revival in the 2020s decade.
- The impact of her wedding on the public perception of marriage.

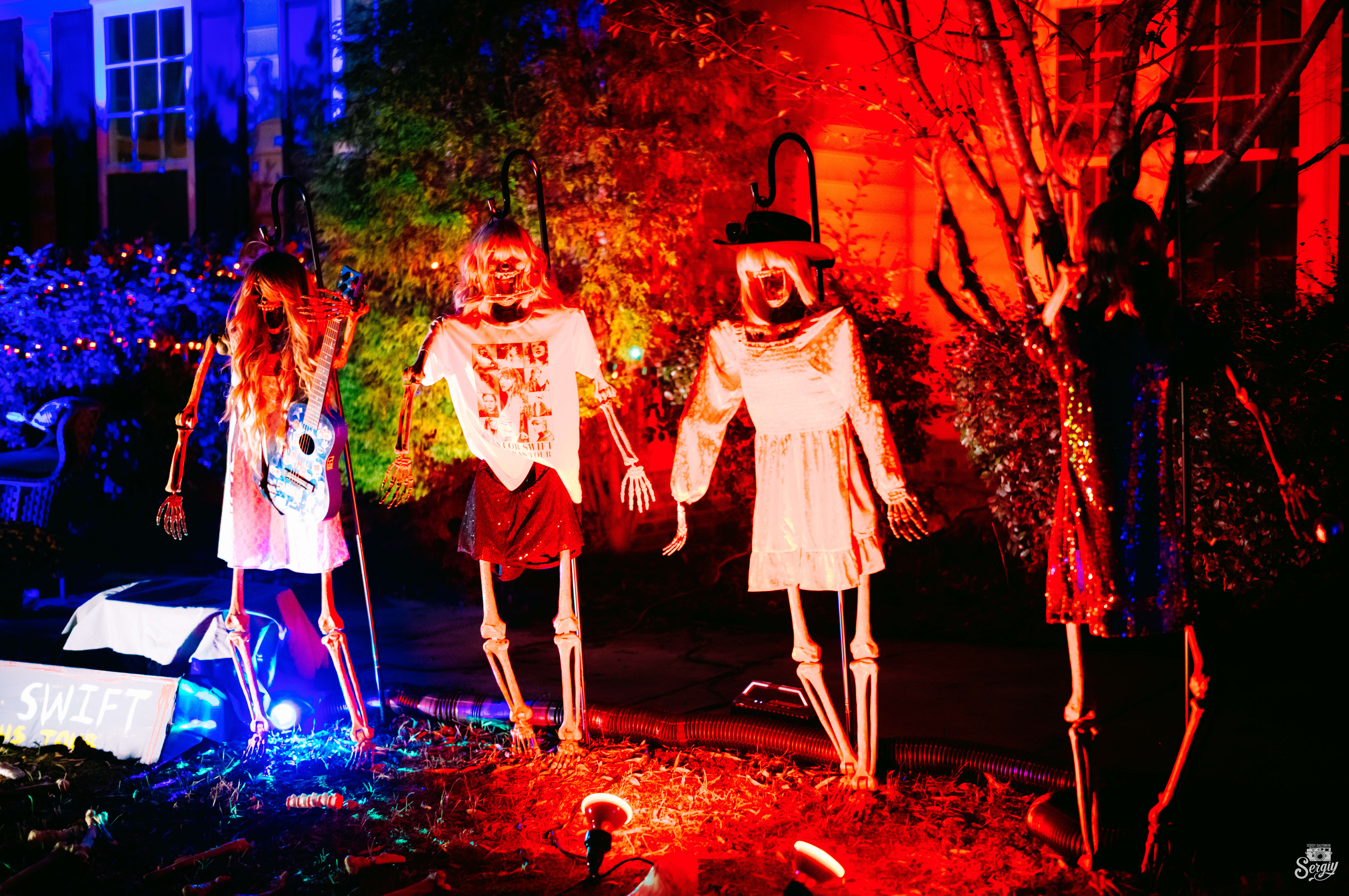
Swift's eras as halloween decorations

According to Time's Sam Lansky, the "real" Taylor Swift effect is psychological. It has influenced people, especially women who have been "conditioned to accept dismissal, gaslighting, and mistreatment from a society that treats their emotions as inconsequential", to believe that their emotions and perceptions matter. Kyle Chayka of The New Yorker coined the term "Swiftularity" to refer to Swift's cultural "inescapability". Chayka opined that Swiftularity is a media funnel, "siphoning [the public] toward an increasingly narrow set of subjects", wherein contemporaneous objects or topics in popular culture become part of Swift's influence one by one, ranging from politics and sports to technology like artificial intelligence (AI). Hao Xu and Yuzheng Li, academics in the areas of communication and marketing, opined that "it's hard to think of a single artist that has had more profound implications on so many facets of contemporary life—from gender and fandom to economics, popular culture to politics" than Swift. Jackson Weaver of CBC News named the Taylor Swift effect a defining element of the 21st-century.

=== American symbol ===
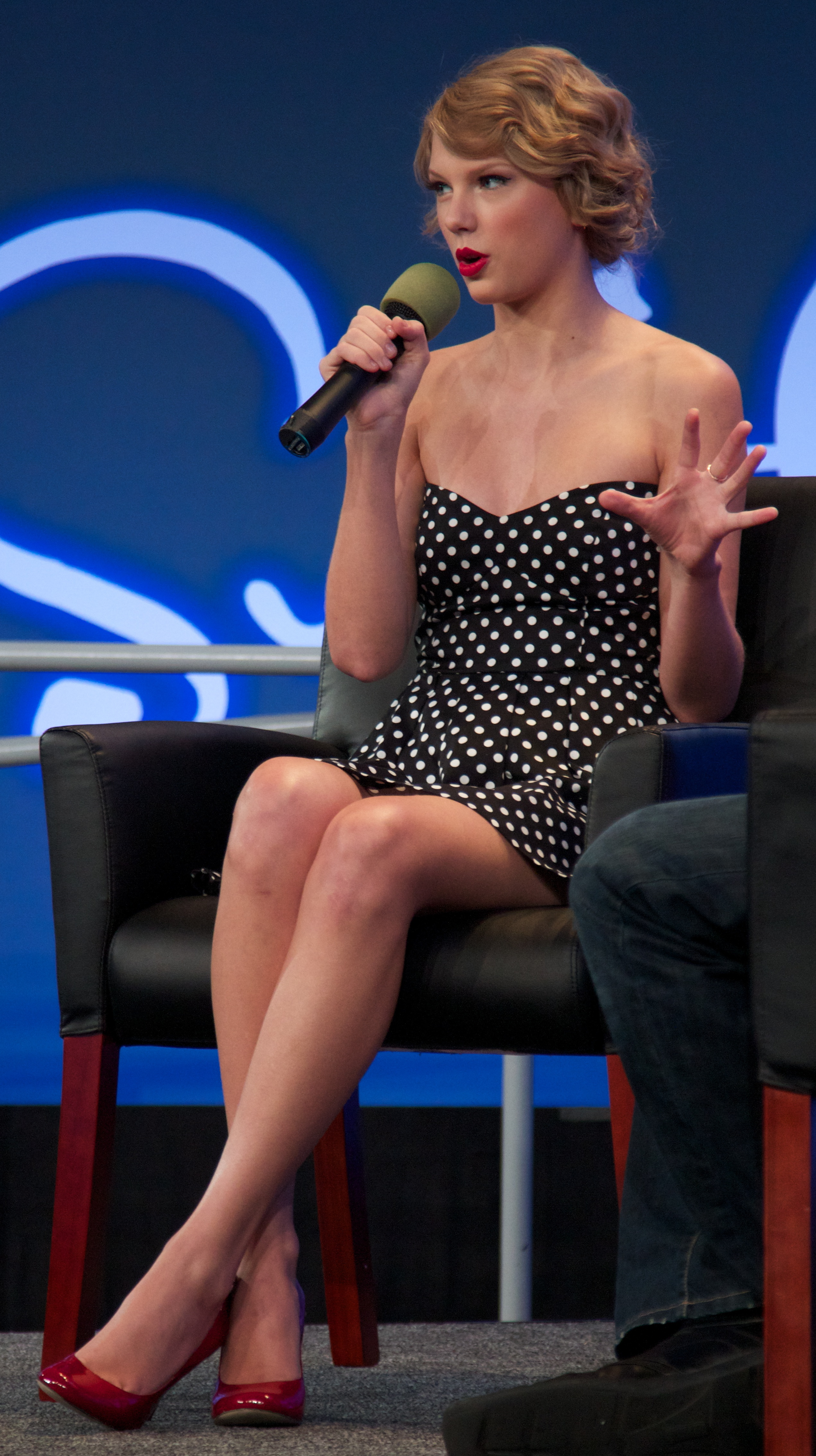
Swift's early girl-next-door image made her "America's Sweetheart".

Journalists associate Swift's fame with Americanism. According to Knibbs, with her second studio album Fearless (2008), Swift had become a "countrified celebrity solidified into industrial-grade American fame" due to her craftsmanship. Jack Dickey of Time said, Swift became "America's most important musician" by 2014. Maxim called her career "a quintessential American success story". Collider contributor Shaina Weatherhead wrote that "Whether she likes it or not, Taylor Swift has become a pillar of the cultural zeitgeist", embodying love, diligence and feminism. Weatherhead added Swift's fame turned her into a staple of American culture beyond just American music.

Journalists such as Ann Jamieson of Tampa Bay Times, MS NOW's Michael A. Cohen and NBC News's Kaetlyn Liddy have described Swift as an "American treasure", "the most famous and influential cultural icon" in the U.S., and "synonymous with American pop culture", respectively. Writer Anna Mark felt that the Swift's hold on popular culture impacted American culture in the process. In an op-ed for The Washington Post, Eugene Robinson opined Swift and the Super Bowl are two of the most beloved phenomena in American culture. Her wedding to football player Travis Kelce was widely described as an American royal function; Tyler Forgatt of The New Yorker described their marital union as a merger of "America's two state religions"—pop music and football.

Vulture's Nate Jones considers Swift a cultural embodiment of American hegemony, while The Wall Street Journal columnist Peggy Noonan felt Americans should be thankful to the "epic American story" of Swift's career. Emily St. James of Vox wrote that Swift tells the stories of American millennials through her songs in the manner Springsteen represented American baby boomers. Writers at Financial Times described her as one of "America's most successful cultural symbols". Swift also metaphorically called herself as "Miss Americana" in her 2019 song "Miss Americana & the Heartbreak Prince", which also inspired the namesake 2020 documentary about her life and career. Rock critic Greil Marcus remarked that Swift wears the American flag on her face: "red lips, white skin and blue eyes."

== Musicianship ==
=== Country music revival ===
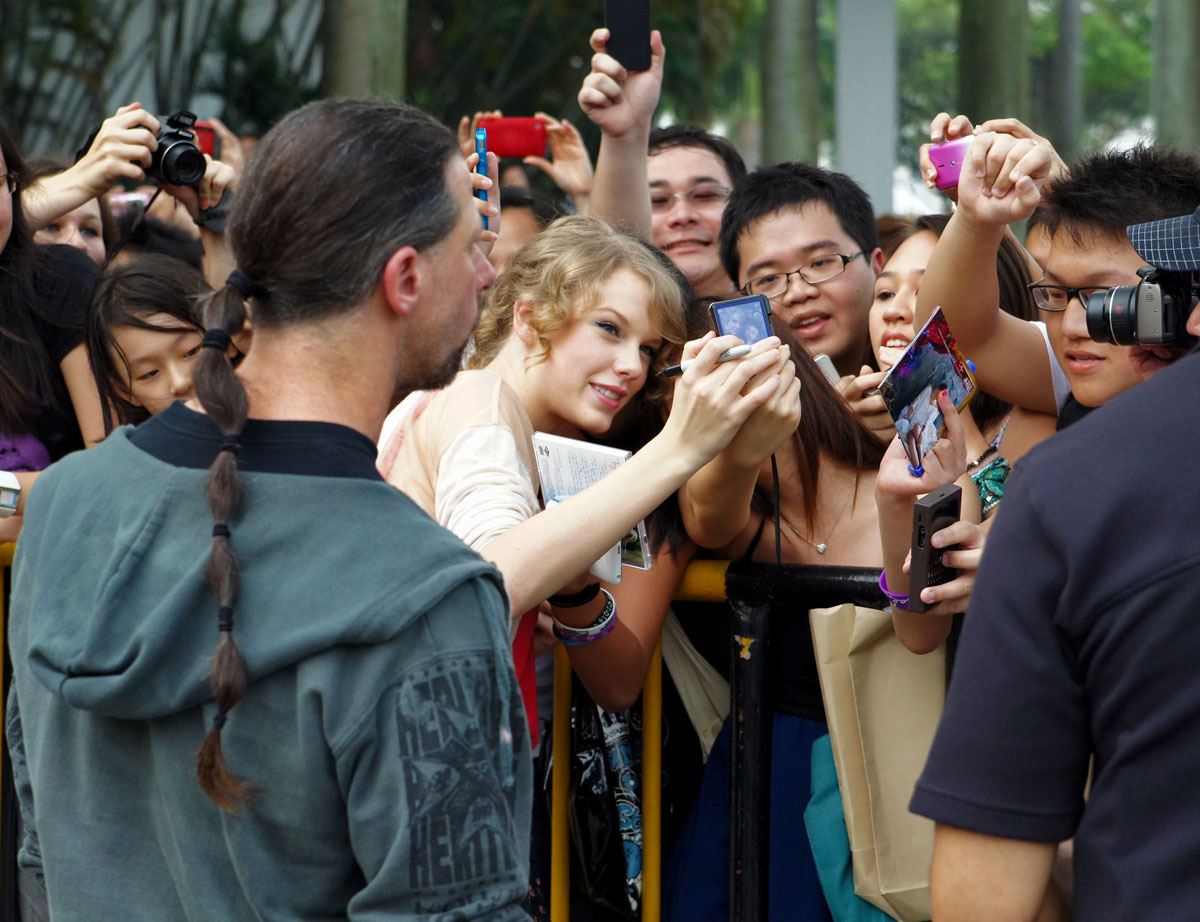
Swift with her Singaporean fans in 2011

Swift reshaped the 21st-century country music scene, and has been one of the most acclaimed country artists of her generation. According to Tom Roland of Billboard, the country landscape is "much different today" due to Swift and her career that several critics regarded "unorthodox". Rosen described Swift as the first country act whose fame extended beyond the U.S. and marked internationally, as she offered "modernity, cosmopolitanism, youth" in a genre traditionally representing conservatism, parochialism and older adults. Her chart success extended to Asia and the U.K., where country music had not been popular. As of February 2011, Fearless sold 400,000 copies in Hong Kong, Taiwan, Indonesia and the Philippines. Following her rise to fame, country record labels became interested in signing young singers capable of writing their own music.

In 2008, Sasha Frere-Jones of The New Yorker called Swift a "preternaturally skilled student of established values". Frere-Jones wrote, as the opening act for Rascal Flatts, Swift "[strutted] across stage platforms, performing a percussion duet on garbage cans, and switching gears without pause—her voice, all the while, light and breathy and without affectation—she returned the crowd's energy with the professionalism she has shown since the age of fourteen." Rolling Stone said Swift's country music had a large impact on 2010s pop music. The Country Music Association recognized Swift's "long-term positive impact on the appreciation of country music for generations to come" by awarding her with the second-ever Pinnacle Award in 2013.

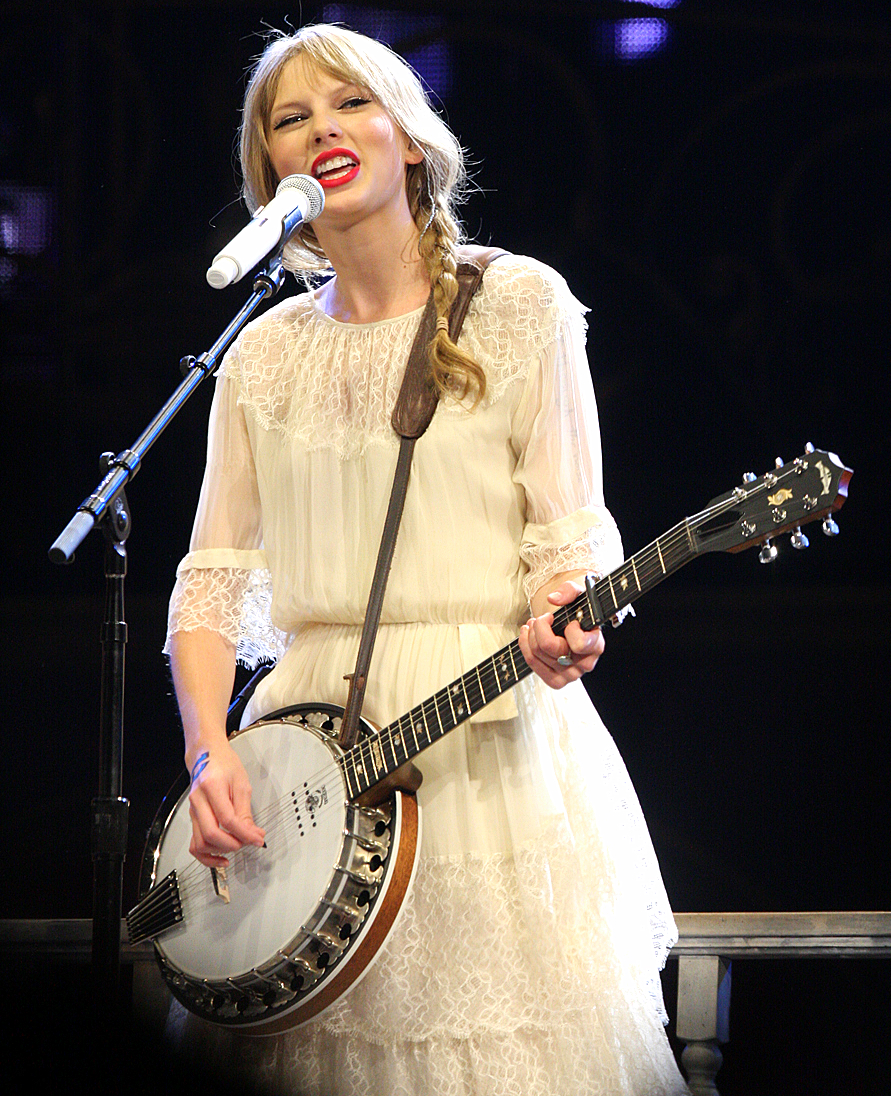
Swift performing "Mean" on the Speak Now World Tour (2012) in Sydney, Australia

According to Roland, Swift insisted on writing her songs, mining inspiration from her real life. She entered country music, which has historically been "a place where adults sang grown-up songs for other adults". With her autobiographical songs of romance and heartbreak, Swift introduced the country genre to a relatable younger generation. Although the U.S. country radio's target audience was between ages 25 and 54, listeners were generally limited to those older than 35 years. Various country music acts, label executives, and radio programmers have unsuccessfully attempted to lower this median age since the early 1980s, but with Swift's rise in the mid to late 2000s, the median age dropped below 25 with the genre attracting teenagers. According to programmer John Shomby, Swift "wrote for that specific age and was the first one to ever do that." Critic Gavin Edwards opined in 2020 that although LeAnn Rimes achieved major commercial success as a teenage country singer in the 1990s, she could not have Swift's longevity as "most modern country radio stations are narrowly focused on women over thirty". He attributed Swift's rise to fame to "a rare blend of goofy teenager and polished saleswoman, which has let her tap into a huge market of country-loving teens".

Swift was one of the first country acts to employ the internet as a marketing tool, promoting her music through Myspace, which was the largest social networking website in the world from 2005 to 2009. She created her MySpace page the day before her then-label, Big Machine Records, was launched (August 31, 2005), and eventually amassed over 45 million streams via MySpace, which label CEO Scott Borchetta cited to convince "skeptical" country radio stations of Swift's niche audience. Social media followings and streaming service data have since been used "to prove an act's viability to radio". Sisario credited Swift with widening the appeal of country music, introducing it to younger audiences, and contributing to country radio surpassing Top 40 as the largest format in the U.S.

=== Poptimism and versatility ===
Journalists highlighted how Swift redefined the 21st-century pop music direction by expanding pop's perceived boundaries to bring forth emotional engagement and artistic ambition without forfeiting commercial success, defying critical beliefs. In 2013, Rosen described the Red-era Swift as a prim figure—"a rock critic's darling who hasn't the faintest whiff of countercultural cool about her", setting her apart from pop stars that followed the "raunchiness" trend of the period. In 2016, Roland said Swift "managed to conquer country and, in an unprecedented move, transition fully into life as a pop artist with her latest album, 1989, without even a hiccup." 1989's commercial success transformed Swift's image from a country singer to a full-fledged pop star. Its singles received heavy rotation on U.S. radio over one and a half years following its release, which Billboard noted as "a kind of cultural omnipresence" that was rare for a 2010s album.

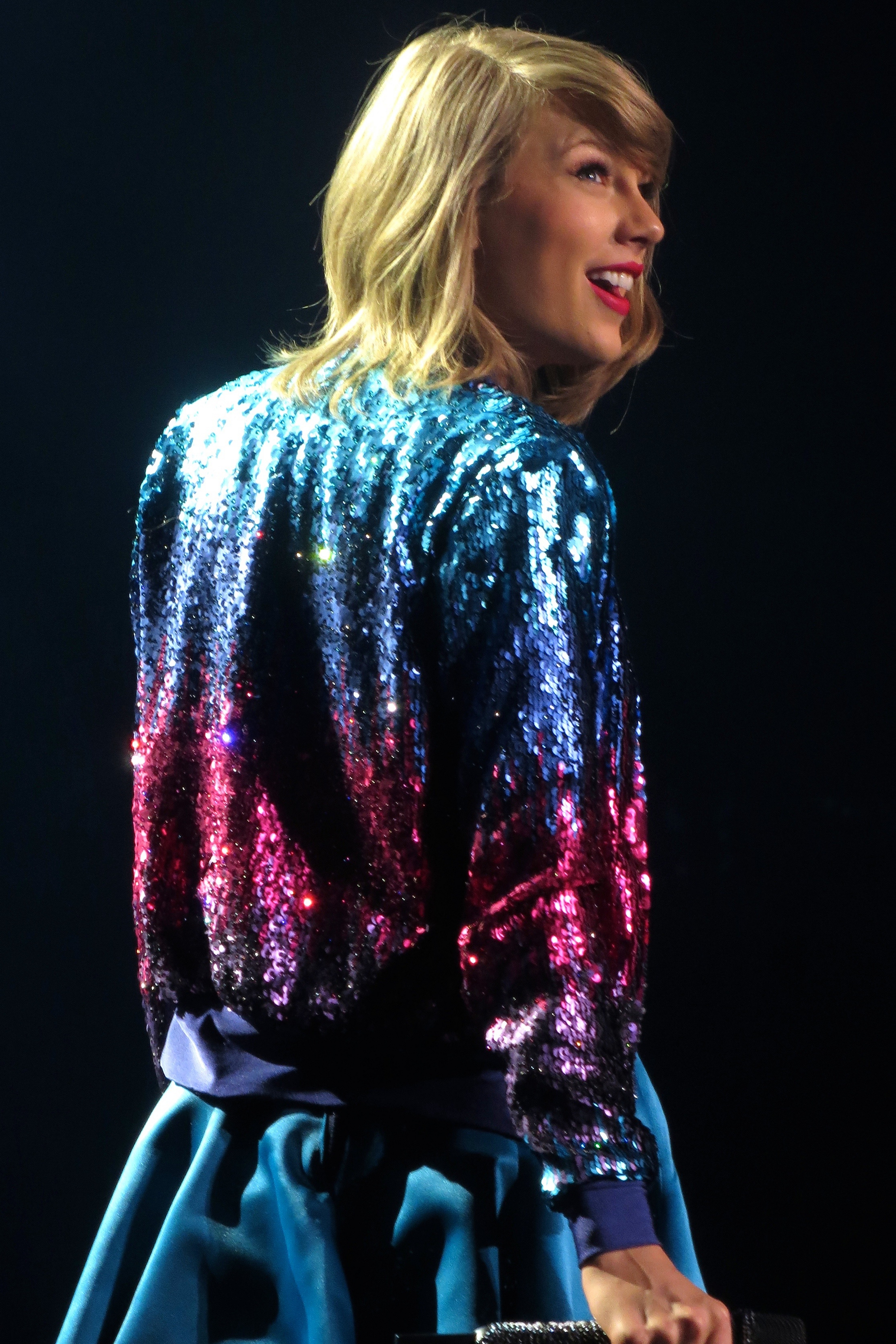
Swift avoided the dance and urban trends prevalent in mainstream pop music to embrace "pure pop" with 1989, which critics thought solidified her as a pop icon.

Humanities academic Shaun Cullen described Swift as a figure "at the cutting edge of postmillennial pop". Retrospectives from GQ's Jay Willis, Vulture's Sasha Geffen, and NME's Hannah Mylrea note how 1989 avoided hip hop and R&B crossover trends, influencing younger artists to explore "pure pop" and cultivating a trend of nostalgic 1980s-styled sound. Ian Gormely of The Guardian deemed Swift a leading figure of 21st-century poptimism who replaced dance and urban trends with ambition. He wrote that her transition to pop proved "chart success and clarity of artistic vision aren't mutually exclusive ideas." Geffen attributed Swift's pop transition success to her lyrics rooted in layered, emotional engagement rather than superficial themes that dominated mainstream pop. Joe Coscarelli of The New York Times opined that Swift's cultural currency helped her "remake pop in her image".

According to Lucy Harbron of Clash, pop stars like Dua Lipa would not exist if Swift had not normalized blending various pop music genres in 1989—an explicit trend among pop artists since the album. It paved the way for artists "who no longer wish to be ghettoised into separated musical genres", for BBC News's Neil Smith. Critics Sam Sanders and Ann Powers regarded Swift as a "surprisingly successful composite of megawatt pop star and bedroom singer-songwriter" while Philip Cosores of Uproxx felt Swift does not completely conform to either the traditional pop star or the "classic rocker" aesthetics, presenting a novel type of artistry. Robert Steiner of Variety felt that Swift's touring ushered a shift in the live music industry, helping pop acts dominate the stadium concert business instead of rock acts. Coscarelli attributed it to Swift's musical auteurism and commercial longevity, comparing her creative output to that of the Beatles. He added that pop stars generally do not last as long as Swift or have a catalog as expansive as hers. The rock critic Robert Christgau remarked that Swift's consistent artistic outputs made her an enduring songwriter, labelling himself a "longtime admirer of Swift".

Swift has ventured into diverse genres and undertaken artistic reinventions throughout her career. Pitchfork opined in 2021 that Swift changed the music landscape forever with a "singularly perceptive" catalog that accommodates musical and cultural shifts. Harbron stated Swift's genre-spanning career encouraged her peers to experiment with diverse sounds. The BBC and Time designated Swift a "music chameleon". Swift stated that she "knew she had to keep innovating" to stay ahead of record labels working to replace her.

Swift's fourth album Red (2012) intensified the critical debate over her genre categorization, as she was a country artist at that time, but Red contained heavy pop, electronic and rock elements. Swift said that she opts to let others label genres. Critics felt that Red signified Swift's inevitable transition to mainstream pop. Randall Roberts of Los Angeles Times claimed that Red is "perfectly rendered American popular music" irrespective of whether it is a pop or country record. The New York Times's Jon Caramanica dubbed Swift "a pop star in a country context". According to Harbron, Red proved to the industry that avant-garde is not the only experimental approach in music and that Swift "opened a door for every other musician" in 2012 to coalesce multiple genres into an album.

Post-1989, Swift has released the 2020 albums Folklore and Evermore, which were described as a mix of indie folk, chamber pop, and alternative rock styles. They expanded the perception of Swift's discography, with many critics describing her catalog as a musically heterogeneous collection of songs. Having demonstrated an emo appeal, Swift's songs are often covered by pop-punk and metalcore acts. American singer-songwriter Noah Kahan said that Folklore and Evermore helped reignite popular interest in folk music, and Billboard credited Swift with the power "to pull any sound she wants into mainstream orbit".

=== Writing and songcraft ===
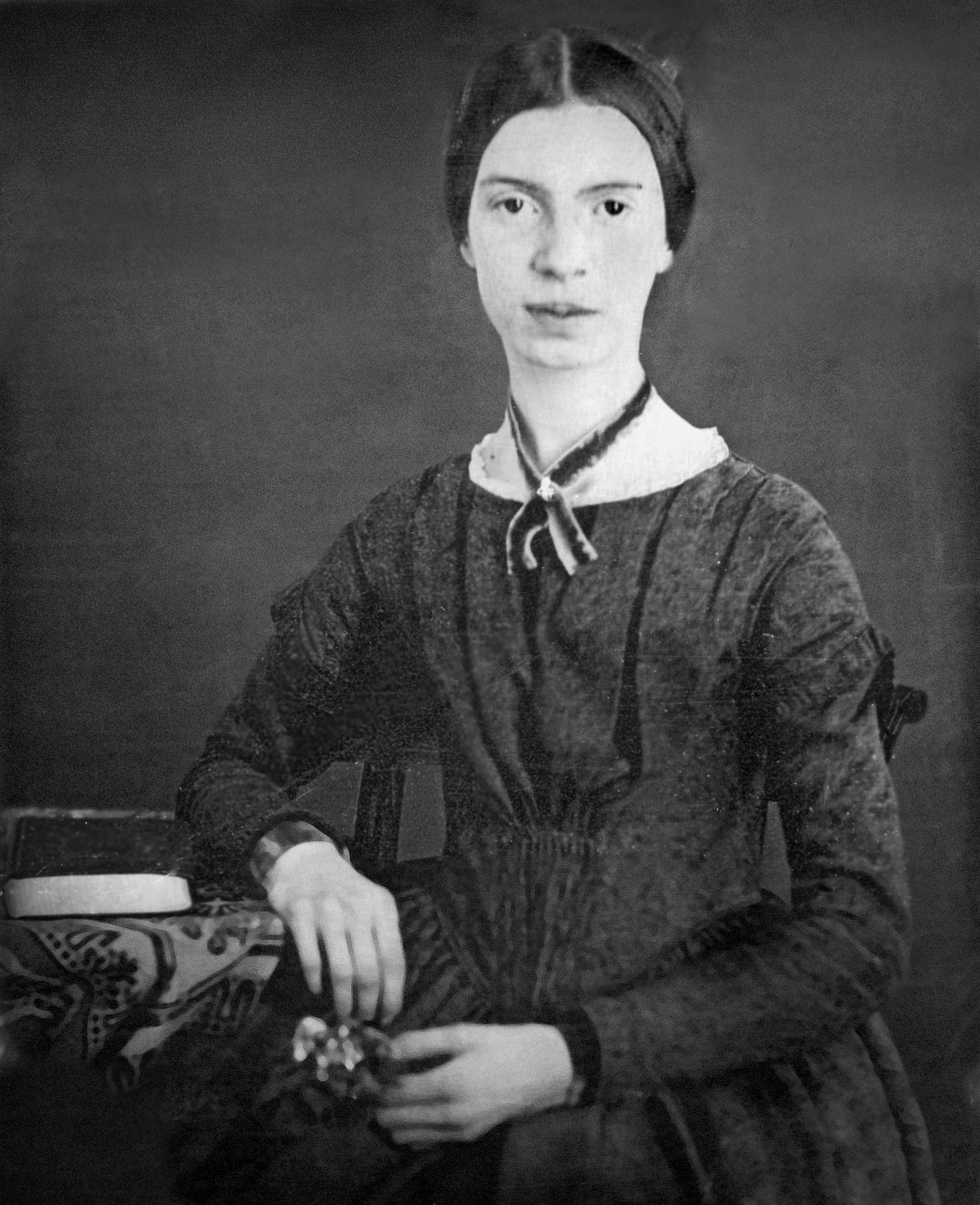
Literary scholars have compared Swift's biographical songs to the works of poets such as Emily Dickinson (left) and novelists like Mary Shelley (right).

Swift is Google's most searched songwriter of all time, and the youngest woman in the Songwriters Hall of Fame. She has keenly presented herself as a writer from the beginning stage of career, "steeped in Music Row's values of craftsmanship and storytelling" as per Rosen. Her lyrics are known for their passion and intense emotions. According to Zoya Raza-Sheikh of The Independent, Swift is able to balance universal themes with hyper-specificity, possessing "an uncanny talent for reflecting the world's emotional angst through her own lens." Professor Hannah Wing of Wichita State University attributed Swift's popularity to the intimacy in her music, cultivating a "feeling of closeness".

Brian Hiatt of Rolling Stone opined that Swift is the reason why some pop stars write their own material. In being personal and vulnerable in her lyrics, music journalist Nick Catucci wrote Swift helped make space for other singers like Ariana Grande, Halsey, and Billie Eilish to do the same. American singer-songwriter Hilary Duff opined that Swift has moved pop stars to attempt sophisticated songwriting in their works, comparing the lyrical prowess expected from artists before and after Swift to "before Christ and after Christ." American record producer Ryan Tedder described Swift as "the most talented top liner I've ever been in a room with" and praised her ability to write lyrics and melody in a "more adept [...] focused, efficient" manner. In 2026, Swift was selected as one of the 30 greatest living American songwriters by The New York Times critics and over 250 musicians and industry personnel, followed by 25,000 of the newspaper's readers voting her as the seventh greatest. That year, the newspaper also called her "one of the most carefully studied songwriters in modern pop music history."

Swift has a capacity for writing songs and lyrics that are very immediate, that tap into universal emotions and experiences, and that also play with her own public image, in a way that creates this self-perpetuating loop of interest and analysis of her music.

— Nate Sloan, The Independent (2022)

According to Raza-Sheikh, Fearless and Speak Now (2010) depicted Swift's adolescent innocence that resonated with a large audience, followed by her matured records Red and 1989, which exhibited her confidence in defining her narrative, becoming "unafraid of upsetting the status quo and critics". She explored "the role of the villain" in her sixth studio album, Reputation (2017). It was not until Folklore and Evermore some critics began to "take her songwriting seriously". Commentators regarded both Folklore and Evermore as poetic reinventions, contextualizing them as "lockdown projects" or archetypal "quarantine albums". Uproxx noted that Folklore changed the tone of music in 2020. Critic Tom Hull wrote that Swift "caught the spirit of the times" with Folklore.

Swift's songs have reportedly helped non-native speakers, especially fans beyond the Anglosphere, learn the English language. British scholar Jonathan Bate dubbed Swift a "real poet" with a "literary sensibility" evoking the likes of Emily Dickinson and Charlotte Brontë that was rare in pop music. Stephanie Burt, an English professor at Harvard University, described Swift's songwriting skills as rare "at both the macro level of songwriting—presenting a story or an idea—as well as the micro level of fitting together vowels and consonants." According to the University of Nottingham literature professor Matthew Green, Swift has developed "a rich literary tradition" in her songs. Sam Corbin of The New York Times described Swift as "a linguistic maverick, writing lyrics that toggle between mixed metaphor and catchy confessional." According to Coscarelli, by advancing the field of songcraft as an important art form, Swift is arguably the "most pored-over writer" of the 21st-century across all written media—on par with the Pope or the British author J. K. Rowling. Swift has been referred to as "pop's greatest diarist" and "the maestro of memory" by other critics, while the term "Swiftian" has been used in music journalism to describe works similar to or derivative of Swift.

== Commercial success ==
These numbers are especially improbable when you consider the music, and the musician, behind them. Swift is an oddball. There is no real historical precedent for her. Her path to stardom has defied the established patterns; she falls between genres, eras, demographics, paradigms, trends. She is a Pennsylvania Yankee turned teen-pop country singer, a Nashville star who crossed over to Top 40, a confessional singer-songwriter who masquerades as a global pop diva. Her music mashes up the quirkily homespun and the gleaming pop-industrial, Etsy and Amazon, in a way we've never quite heard before.

— Music critic Jody Rosen, New York

Swift has gained a reputation as a "perennial chart topper" as per Time. Her discography has achieved huge commercial success across all formats and sectors. Rosen felt it was historically unprecedented—disproving the presumed notions of music's commercial success in the 21st century. In the late 2010s, publications considered her million-selling albums a peculiarity in the streaming-dominated industry, as the end of the album era was marked by decline in album sales. Apart from publications like the Financial Times, musicologists such as Mary Fogarty, Gina Arnold and Paul Théberge have dubbed Swift's commercial success an anomaly.

On Swift's success enduring into the 2020s, The Atlantic opined that her "reign" defies the notion that the prime of an artist's commercial success lasts for few years only, whereas Rolling Stone considers her "a genre on her own", forming a major portion of total music consumption figures. In 2024, Joe Coscarelli of The New York Times attributed Swift's long-lasting success to "a mix of prolific artistic output and relentless business savvy, plus cultural dominance as a celebrity". Dorian Lynskey of The Guardian and Nora Princiotti of The Ringer declared Swift is unrivalled in terms of commercial success.

=== Domestic ===
A highly successful artist on multiple Billboard charts, Swift has been credited with pushing the boundaries of commercial success. She ranks eighth on Greatest of All Time Artists—a Billboard list ranking music acts based on chart success, and was named the most successful artist of the 21st-century. Swift is the longest-reigning act of the Billboard Artist 100 (100 weeks), surpassing the Beatles; the soloist with the most cumulative weeks atop the Billboard 200 (100); the woman with the most Billboard 200 number-ones (14), Hot 100 entries (281), top-10 entries (74), and top-40 entries (182), and weeks atop the Top Country Albums chart (99); and the act with the most Digital Songs number-ones (26), the most number-one Pop Airplay songs (12), and the longest song to top the Hot 100 ("All Too Well (10 Minute Version)"). Swift is the first and only act to monopolize the Hot 100's top 10 as well as top 14, and place as the Billboard Year-End number-one artist in three different decades (2009, 2015 and 2023).

Critics describe Swift's commercial power as unrivaled, as her success is evenly distributed across streaming, pure album sales, and track sales. She is the only act in Luminate Data history to have eight albums (or more than two albums)—Speak Now, Red, 1989, Reputation, Midnights, 1989 (Taylor's Version) (2023), The Tortured Poets Department (2024), and The Life of a Showgirl (2025)—sell over one million copies in a week. The Life of a Showgirl became the fastest selling album of all time. To New York magazine, her sales figures prove she is "the one bending the music industry to her will". Financial Times and i-D called Swift "the last pop superstar", given her ability to generate sales figures unseen since the "1990s boy bands" era, which was regarded as the commercial peak of the U.S. music business.

=== International ===
The International Federation of the Phonographic Industry (IFPI) named her Global Recording Artist of the Year in 2014, 2019, 2022, 2023, 2024, and 2025, for being the most consumed artist in those years; she is the only artist to achieve this six times or more than twice. Charlotte Kripps of The Independent said Swift led an international resurgence in country music, introducing the genre to a new U.K. audience. Swift also became the first country act to find chart success beyond the Anglosphere. Rosen described her as the genre's "first truly global star", cultivating dedicated fandoms in foreign markets such as Ireland, Brazil, Taiwan, and China, where country music was not popular. Jakarta, Quezon City and Singapore are among her biggest cities on streaming platforms.

She holds multiple all-time chart feats in Australia, Ireland and the U.K. In 2021, she became the first act to have three number-one albums on the U.K. Albums Chart in less than a year, besting the Beatles' 54-year-old record. On Chinese music platforms, her albums are some of the best-selling of all time and have earned her the highest income for a foreign artist (CN¥ 159,000,000). She was the world's highest-grossing female touring act of the 2010s. According to Annabelle Heard, CEO of the Australian Recording Industry Association (ARIA), "Swift has completely reset the narrative for what a solo artist can accomplish."

=== Streaming ===
On Spotify, Swift is the most streamed artist of all time globally, the only artist to have received more than 200 and 300 million streams in one day, and the first female act to reach 100 million monthly listeners. The Tortured Poets Department is the most streamed album in a single day, with 315 million streams, and the first to collect one billion global streams in a week; Midnights and 1989 (Taylor's Version) hold the second and third places, respectively. Variety dubbed Swift the "Queen of Stream". Swift is also Apple Music's most streamed woman ever and set the platform's all-time record for most listeners for any artist in a single year. The platform's vice president, Oliver Schusser, stated, "She is a generation-defining artist and a true change agent in the music industry, and there is no doubt that her impact and influence will be felt for years to come." According to Billboard, Swift's catalog is responsible for generating four of the largest global streaming weeks of any artist.

=== Physical ===
Swift is noted for her vast CD and vinyl sales in the 21st century, when music consumption had largely shifted to digital formats. Having driven the vinyl revival, she is regarded as a champion of independent record shops. Swift has made LP variants of her albums available exclusively at small businesses, driving their sales; during the COVID-19 pandemic, she shared her LPs to record shops for free. Due to her support of independent record shops, Record Store Day (RSD) named Swift their first-ever global ambassador.

Evermore held the record for the biggest sales week for vinyl LPs in the U.S. since Luminate Data's inauguration in 1991, although it has since been surpassed by Swift's own Red (Taylor's Version) (2021) with 112,000 vinyl LP sales, followed by Midnights with 575,000 LPs, and then The Tortured Poets Department with 700,000 LPs. Midnights is the first 21st-century album to sell over one million LPs in the U.S. and over 80,000 LPs in a year in the U.K. 1989 (Taylor's Version) sold 1.014 million copies on vinyl in the U.S. in 2023, becoming the first vinyl album to sell one million copies in a calendar year since data tracking began, and Swift accounted for 7% of vinyl sales in 2023. 1989 (Taylor's Version) also helped annual U.K. vinyl sales reach nearly six million copies, the highest in 33 years. For the first time since 1992, the U.K. Office for National Statistics (ONS) designated vinyl records as one of the select goods and services in assessing the national cost of living and rate of inflation. In 2023, Swift became the first artist to concurrently occupy the top three positions of the IFPI Global Vinyl Album Chart with her albums. In 2025, LP sales of The Life of a Showgirl bolstered net vinyl industry incomes beyond the $1 billion mark for the first time since 1983.

=== Peers ===
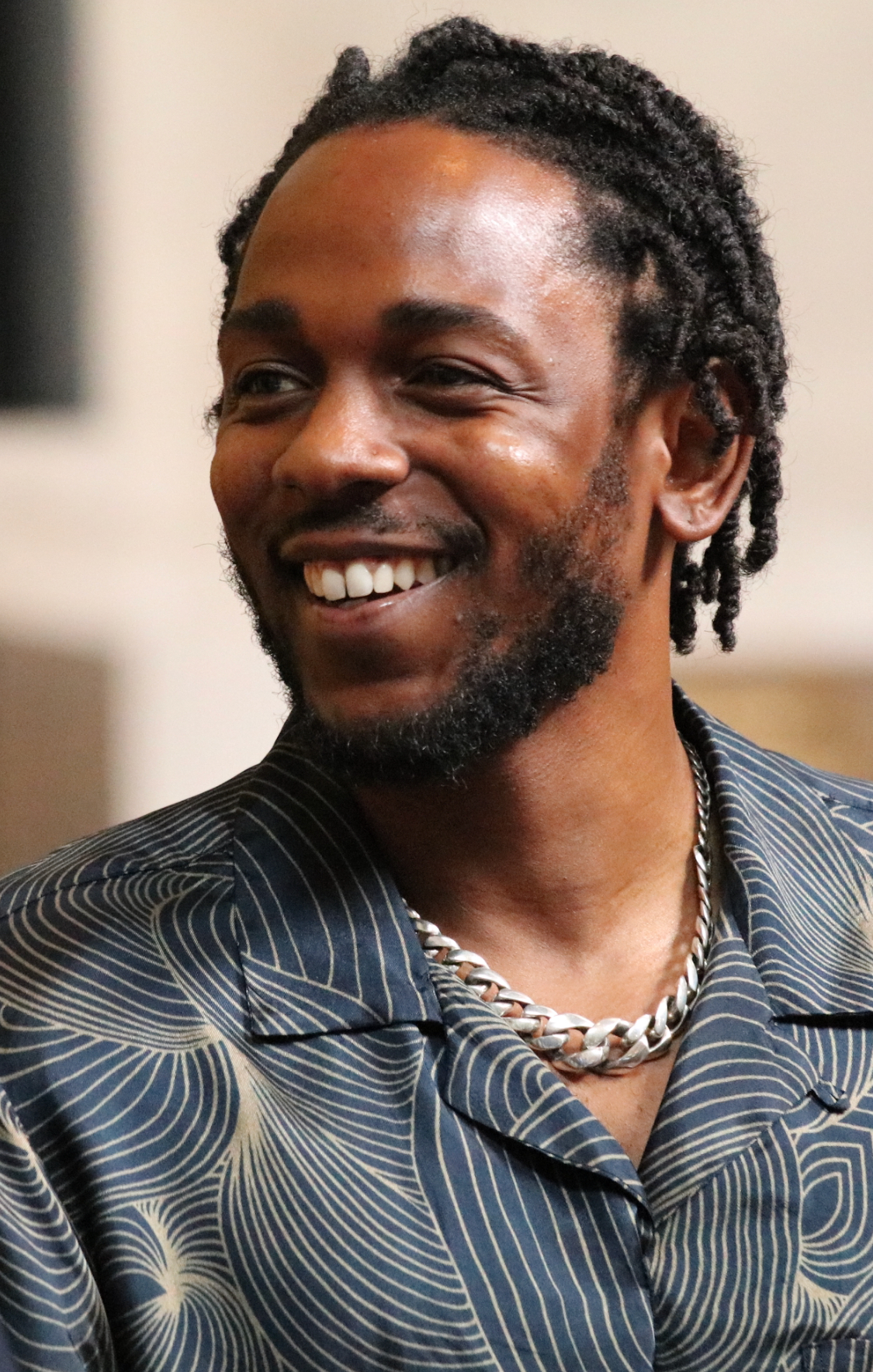
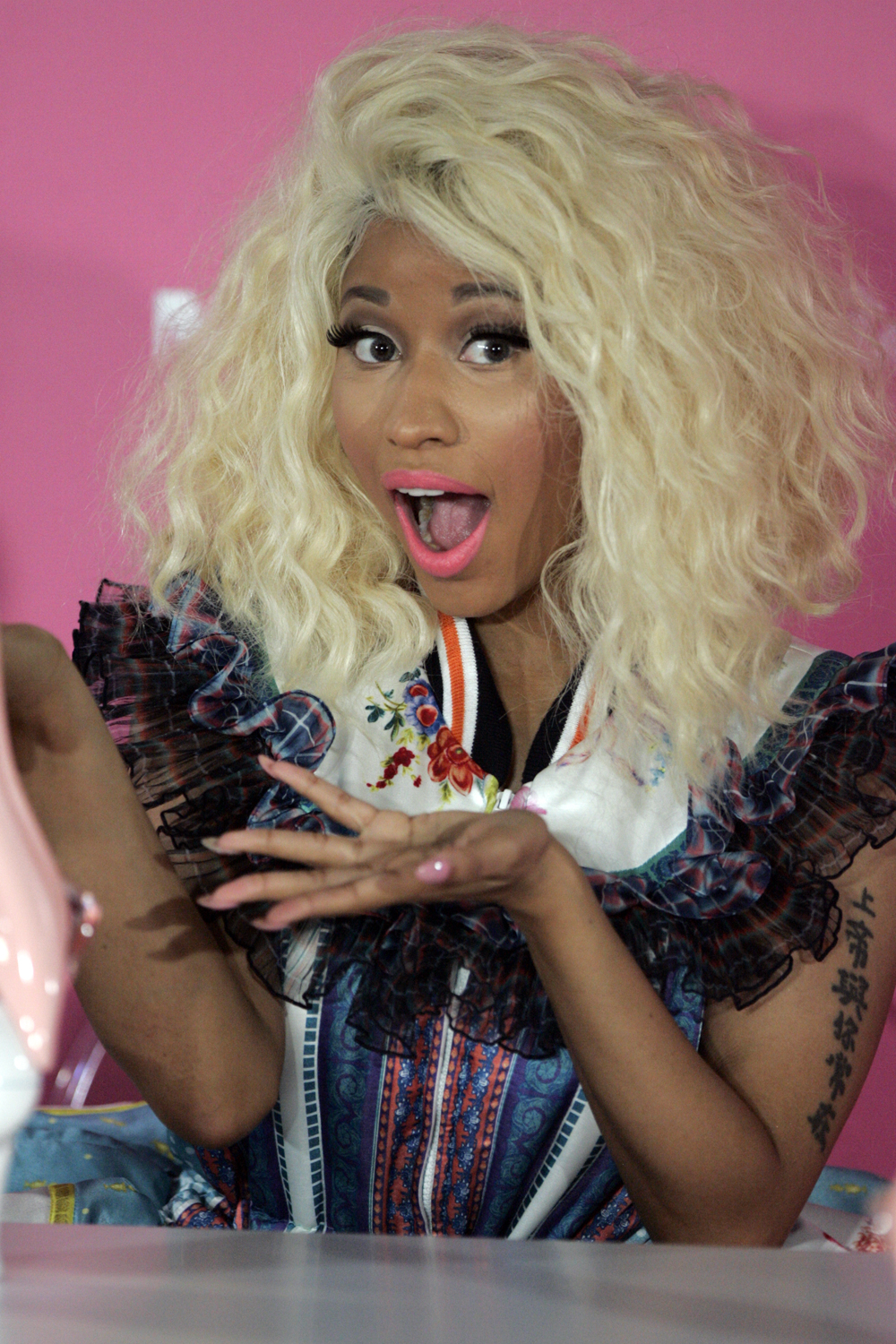
Swift helped American rapper Kendrick Lamar (left) score his first number-one song on the Billboard Hot 100 with "Bad Blood" (2015); Trinidadian rapper Nicki Minaj (right) credited Swift, who had promoted Minaj's 2011 song "Super Bass" before it became a single, with the song's unanticipated success.

Swift has helped other artists achieve wider success. Swift's "Me!" (2019), "Exile" (2020), "No Body, No Crime" (2020), "Snow on the Beach" (2022), and "Florida!!!" (2024) marked the highest-charting songs on the Hot 100 for the music acts Panic! at the Disco, Bon Iver, Haim, Lana Del Rey, and Florence and the Machine, respectively.

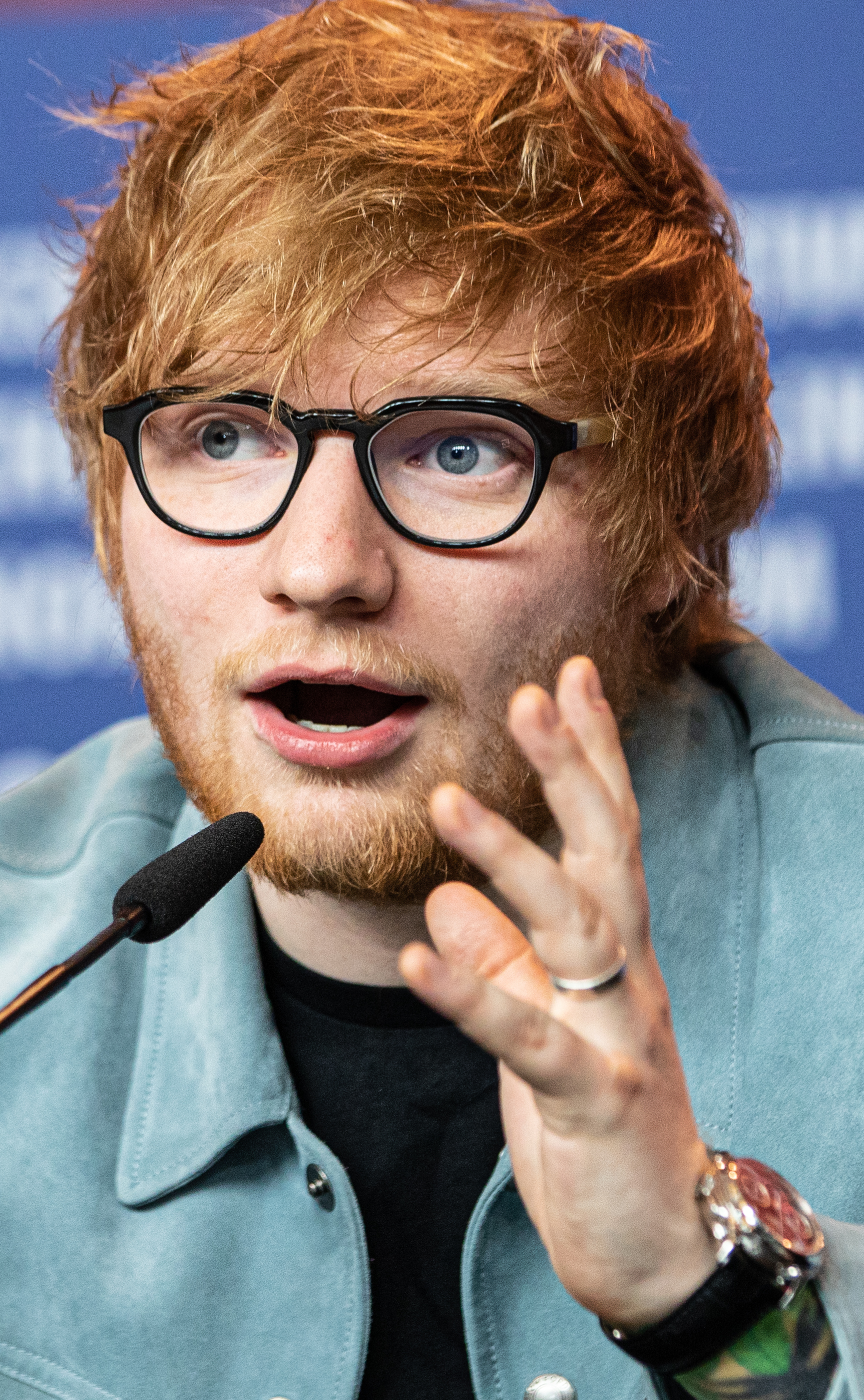
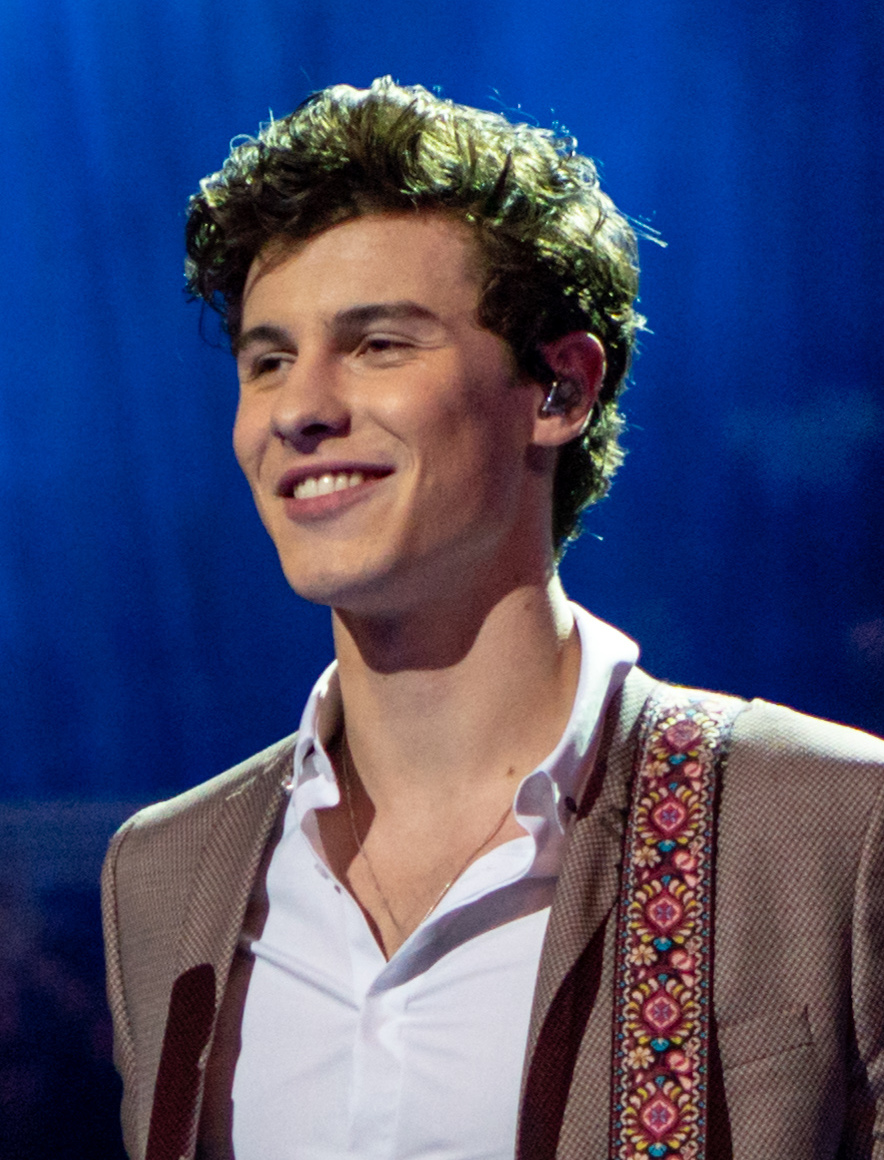
English singer Ed Sheeran (left) and Canadian singer Shawn Mendes (right) opened for Swift at the Red Tour (2013) and the 1989 World Tour (2015), respectively, before achieving wider commercial success.

Initially lesser-known artists have been propelled to mainstream fame after Swift invited them on her tours as opening acts, such as Ed Sheeran, Charli XCX, Shawn Mendes, Camila Cabello, Sabrina Carpenter, and Gracie Abrams. USA Today dubbed it the "Taylor Swift School of Career Growth", stating artists who join "Swift's orbit" skyrocket in popularity. Filipino-British singer Beabadoobee, an opening act on the Eras Tour, stated that touring with Swift was one of her dreams growing up.

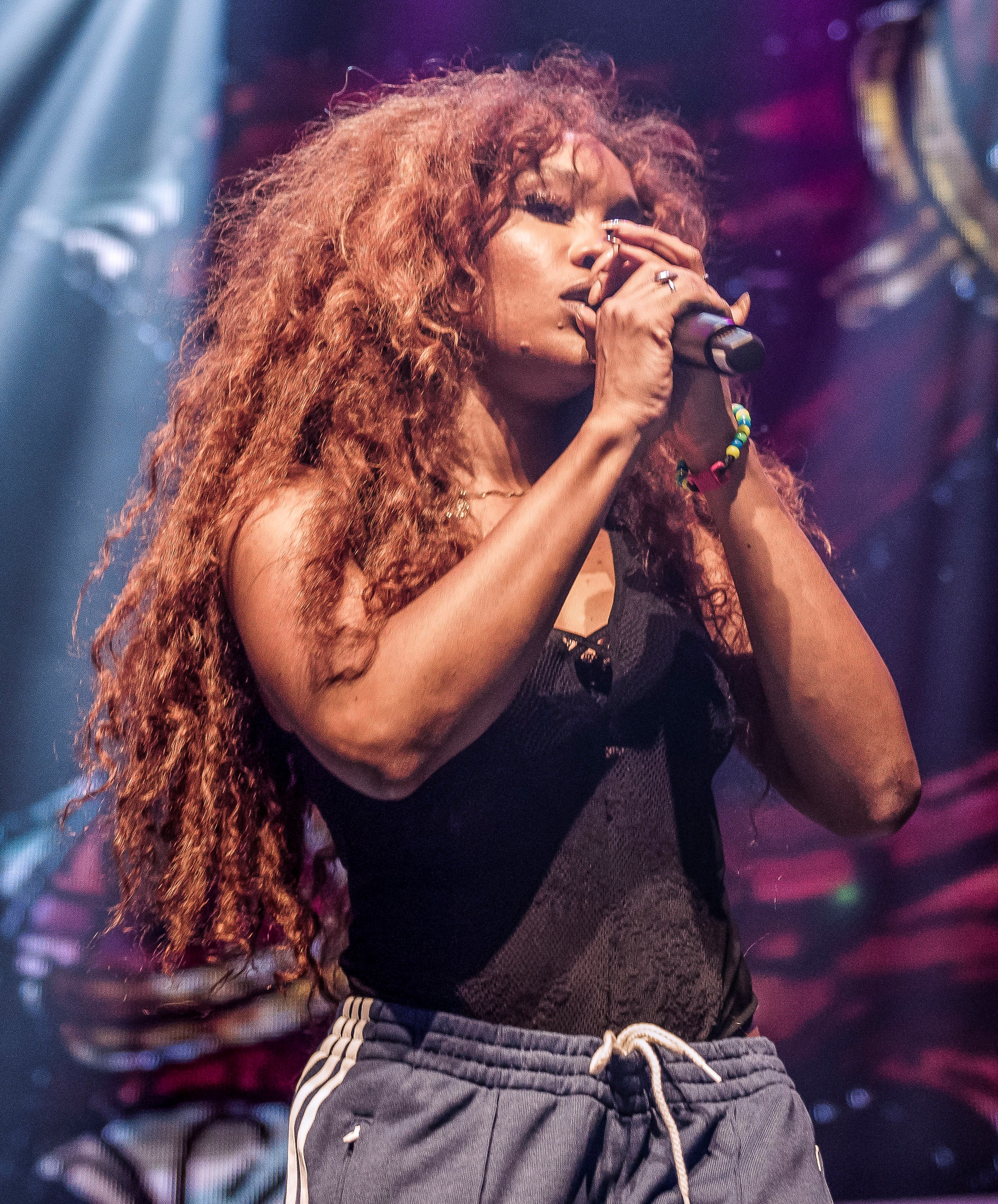
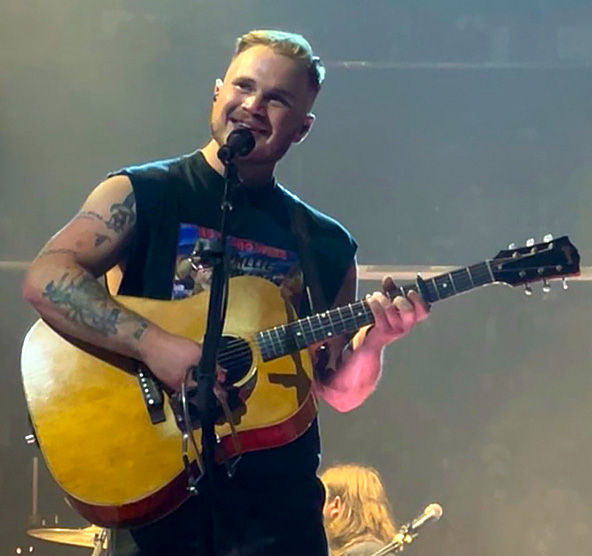
Andrew Unterberger of Billboard opined, Swift raised the "commercial ceiling" for singer-songwriters, helping artists like SZA (left) and Zach Bryan (right), who emphasize personal themes in their writing, achieve wider appeal in mainstream music.

American musicians Jack Antonoff and Aaron Dessner acknowledged Swift's role in expanding their careers as record producers. Antonoff stated, "Taylor's the first person who let me produce a song. Before Taylor, everyone said: 'You're not a producer'. It took Taylor Swift to say: 'I like the way this sounds'." Antonoff worked extensively with Swift and went on to produce albums for other artists such as Lorde's Melodrama (2017), St. Vincent's Masseduction (2017), Del Rey's Norman Fucking Rockwell! (2019), Carpenter's Short n' Sweet and Kendrick Lamar's GNX (both 2024), while Dessner began working with artists such as Sheeran, Abrams, and Maya Hawke.

== Entrepreneurship ==
"At 33 years old, pop star Taylor Swift is one of the world's most influential business leaders. She has outmaneuvered music executives vying to control her song rights, sparred with tech giants and sold record numbers of albums. She secured her fans' loyalty by speaking directly to them online—before it was a marketing strategy."

— Journalist Anne Steele, The Wall Street Journal

Swift established a reputation as a savvy businesswoman. Journalists often distinguish her as an "unparalleled marketing genius" with "high-minded business acumen" and an entrepreneurial role model. According to Steele, Swift's "winding and winning" career presents management lessons beyond the music industry. Economist Paul Krugman argued, "Being a congenital cynic, I'd like to attribute her fame to marketing hype, but the sad truth is that she's a highly talented songwriter and musician with remarkable stage presence." Universal Music Publishing Group CEO Jody Gerson said that Swift "taught me more about my own power than anyone else", praising Swift's "unapologetic ambition".

Billboard placed Swift atop its 2024 Power 100 list of the most influential music industry executives, a recognition typically given to male record-label heads. Author Melinda Newman commented, Swift is an enduring force in the music business committed to innovation and risks that "reap remarkable rewards" for the rest of the industry. Forbes named Swift one of the top 250 business innovators in the US, for her "Rockefeller-style vertical integration". Commercial executive Gillian Hepburn explained that Swift owns much of her musical supply chain while most artists outsource everything.

=== Name and brand ===
Pitchfork considers Swift's name a brand on its own.

Various authors have compared Swift to media franchises, conglomerate companies or a one-woman brand. Knibbs and Elamin Abdelmahmoud described Swift as an omnipresent musical institution with economic, commercial and cultural consequences. Labor economist Carolyn Sloan likened Swift to "a big corporation, essentially, operating in many sectors". Her brand power has been compared to that of the DC Extended Universe and the Marvel Cinematic Universe. According to Internet survey company QuestionPro, Swift's hypothetical net promoter score would make her the fourth most admired brand in the world. CNN journalists have described the impact of her brand; Bryan Mena opined, Swift "didn't have to run a major company or helm a central bank to wield an immense economic power, and she has achieved remarkable feats that would be impressive for any typical business leader running a Fortune 500 company", whereas Scottie Andrew remarked that news outlets and companies often use her name in headlines, interviews, branded content and products to capitalize off of her fame.

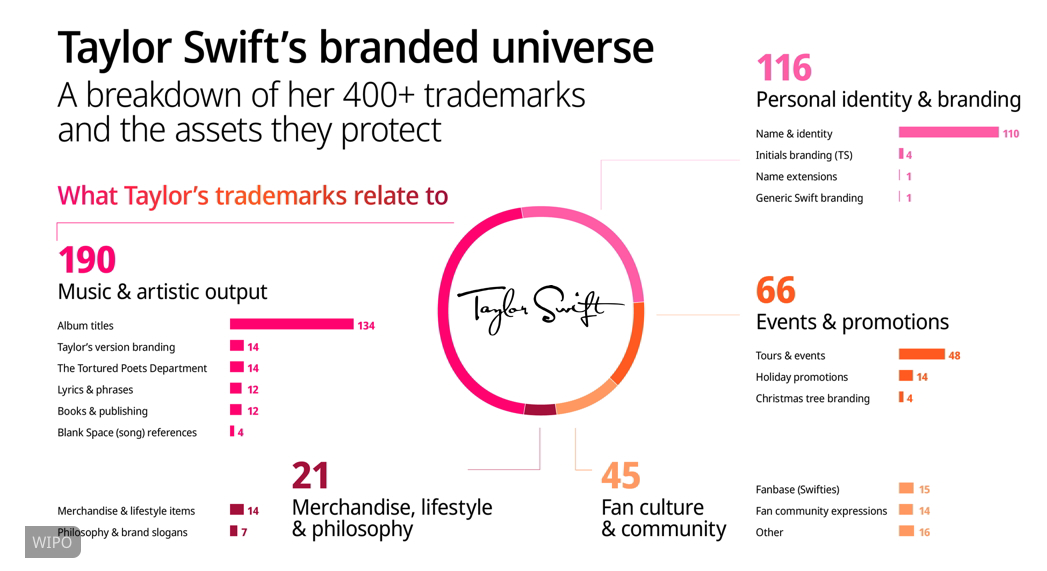
Swift has extensively trademarked her name, creative works, and related commercial assets, including pornographic website domain names (Note: domain addresses such as "taylorswift.porn" and "taylorswift.adult") to prevent them from being misused, a measure known as cybersquatting.

Per Professor R. Polk Wagner at the University of Pennsylvania Law School, Swift associating her lyrics with a range of goods and services through trademark applications represents her understanding that "she is bigger than the music". He added, "It's more of a branding right, thinking of Taylor Swift as a conglomerate." The Lewis Silkin LLP attorney Cliff Fluet opined that, while business-minded artists like Mick Jagger or Metallica's Lars Ulrich have been criticized for it in the past, Swift removed the "ickiness" from commerce and allowed new artists aware of the business: "Now it's like, 'I'm an industry, a conglomerate. I'm Taylor Swift Inc.'."

=== Social media presence ===
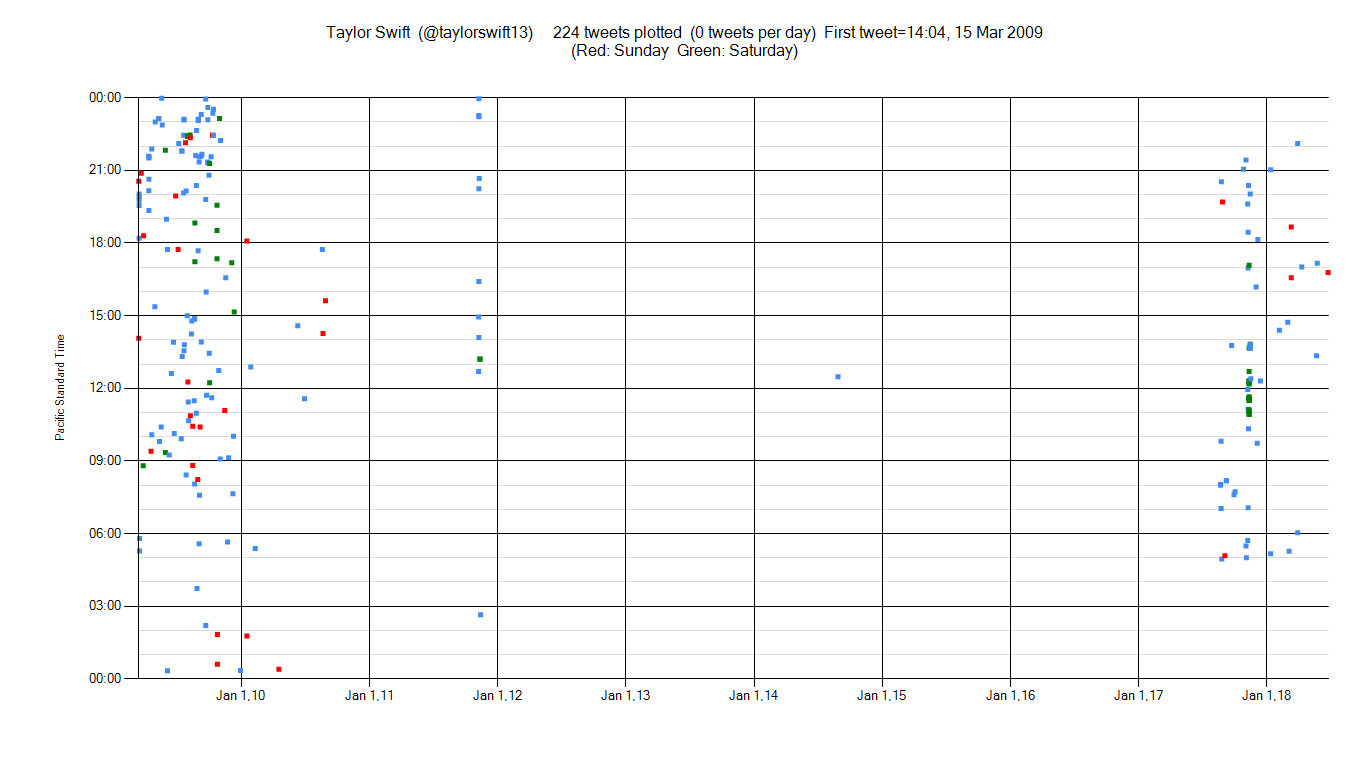
A dot plot quantifying Swift's tweets from January 2010 to 2018; despite her negligible Twitter activity, Swift is one of the platform's most influential celebrities.

Swift, one of the most followed people on social network services, is a "social media powerhouse", according to Entrepreneur. She was the most followed person on Instagram from September 2015 to March 2016, and has consistently been influential on Twitter, placing first in Brandwatch's annual rankings three times. (Note: In 2018, 2019, and 2021.) The Washington Post additionally noted, "Swift is one of few foreign celebrities who have gained more than 10 million followers on Weibo, China's answer to Twitter". Ticketing executive Nathan Hubbard said that Swift was the first musician "to be natively online." Culture critic Brittany Spanos opined that Swift's social media presence is one of the reasons she is still "really relevant" after years: Swift "grew her fan base on Myspace. She was using Tumblr way past its prime. Twitter. She's now on TikTok, commenting on people's videos."

Swift's marketing is a combination of social media engagement and television. Cision called Swift a "master of product launch", with knowledge of "a strategic and well-balanced communications campaign". According to public relations (PR) academic Sinead Norenius-Raniere, Swift's integrated marketing strategy consists of timed announcements across marketing channels, harnessing the potential of both traditional and digital media, authentic and "intimate" communications with consumers to build trust, and usage of multimedia to offer "sneak peeks". Billboard attributed Swift's "enduring relevance" in part to how she "understands her audience" and employs campaigns that "don't neatly fit industry narratives". Her novel promotional efforts, such as Midnights Mayhem with Me, were a subject of critical praise for innovation. Bond Benton, an associate professor in communication and media at Montclair State University said "there is a memetic quality to the way Swift is presented online", which has since been repurposed by other celebrities to increase their engagement.

=== Album cycles ===
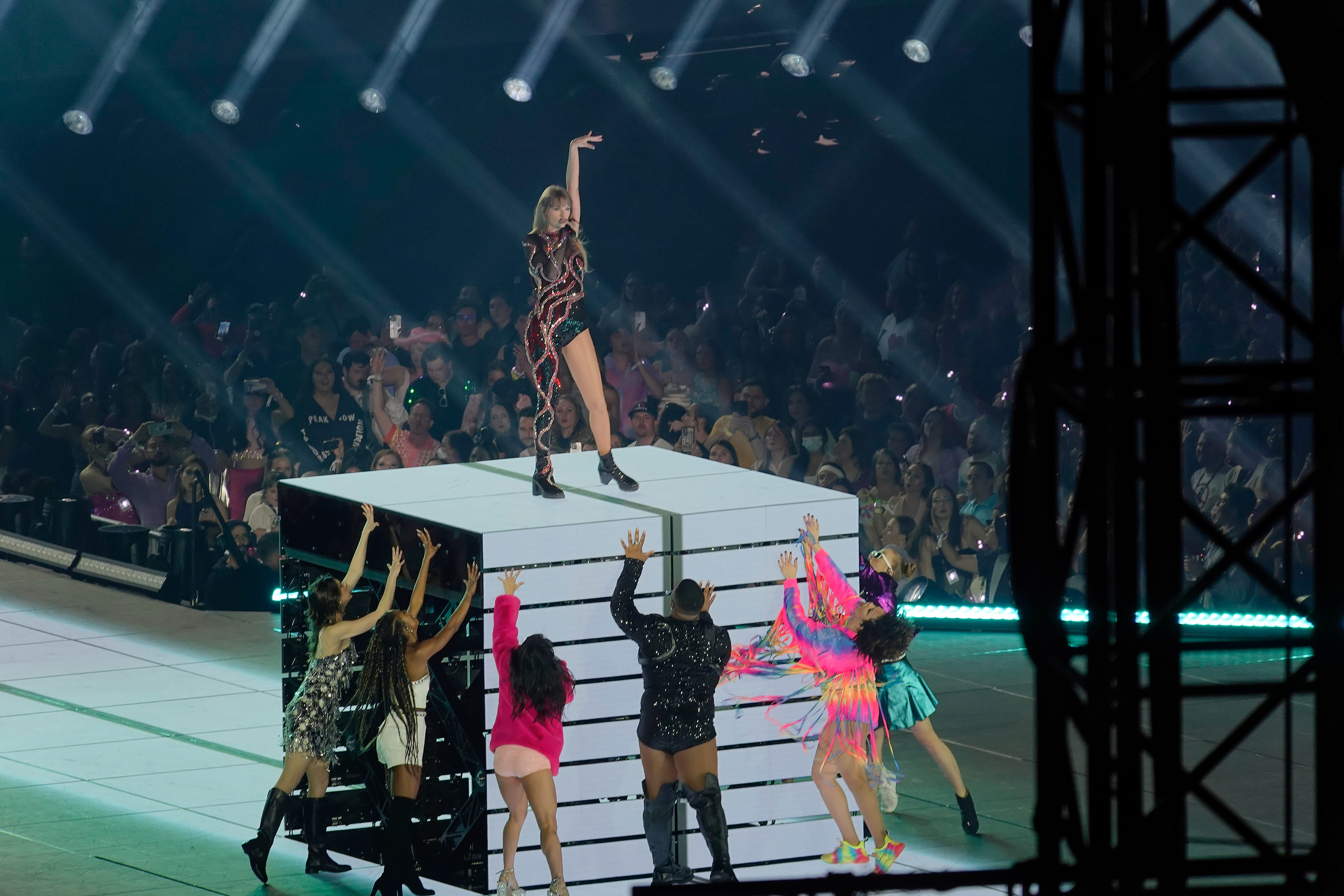
A scene in the Eras Tour where Swift is surrounded by dancers dressed in costumes from her different "eras"

Swift is known for her traditional, conceptual album rollouts, often referred to as "eras", each of which consists of a variety of promotional activities. Rolling Stone described her eras as an inescapable "multimedia bonanza". She is credited with making the "two-year album cycle" approach of releasing and promoting albums the industry standard and helped popularize the term and concept of "eras" in broader media contexts. Nevertheless, journalists also praised Swift's fast-succeeding release of Evermore less than five months after Folklore. Variety compared it to similar moves by the Beatles and U2, while Rolling Stone found it reminiscent of Prince in 1987 and David Bowie in 1977.

Easter eggs and cryptic teasers similar to Swift's became a common practice in pop music. Publications describe her discography as a music "universe" subject to analyses by fans, critics and journalists. Swift's outfits, accessories, diction, color coding, numerology, and elaborate album packaging have also been Easter eggs. According to journalist Ashley Lutz, her marketing style is "an ever-changing burlesque act of selectively revealing details while maintaining an aura of mystery and excitement"—a strategy that goes beyond the music and entertainment industries. Vulture noted, "It's probably impossible to build a successful pop career these days without borrowing from the Taylor Swift tool kit. The Easter eggs, the signature color, the rabid fans."

Each of Swift's eras is characterized by a unique aesthetic, color palette, fashion style, and an associated mood or emotion. The Conversation described her album releases as cultural moments. Reinventing her image and style throughout her career, Swift has popularized several aesthetic trends, such as Polaroid motifs with 1989, and cottagecore with Folklore and Evermore. Lutz opined that the era shifts helped broaden her fan base and critical appeal. Pop culture commentator Jeetendr Sehdev asserted Swift has managed to remain interesting by constantly reinventing herself "while remaining authentic". However, in a counterview, Fairclough claimed that Swift's "shifting aesthetic" indicates her struggle with a lack of identity.

=== Corporate relations ===
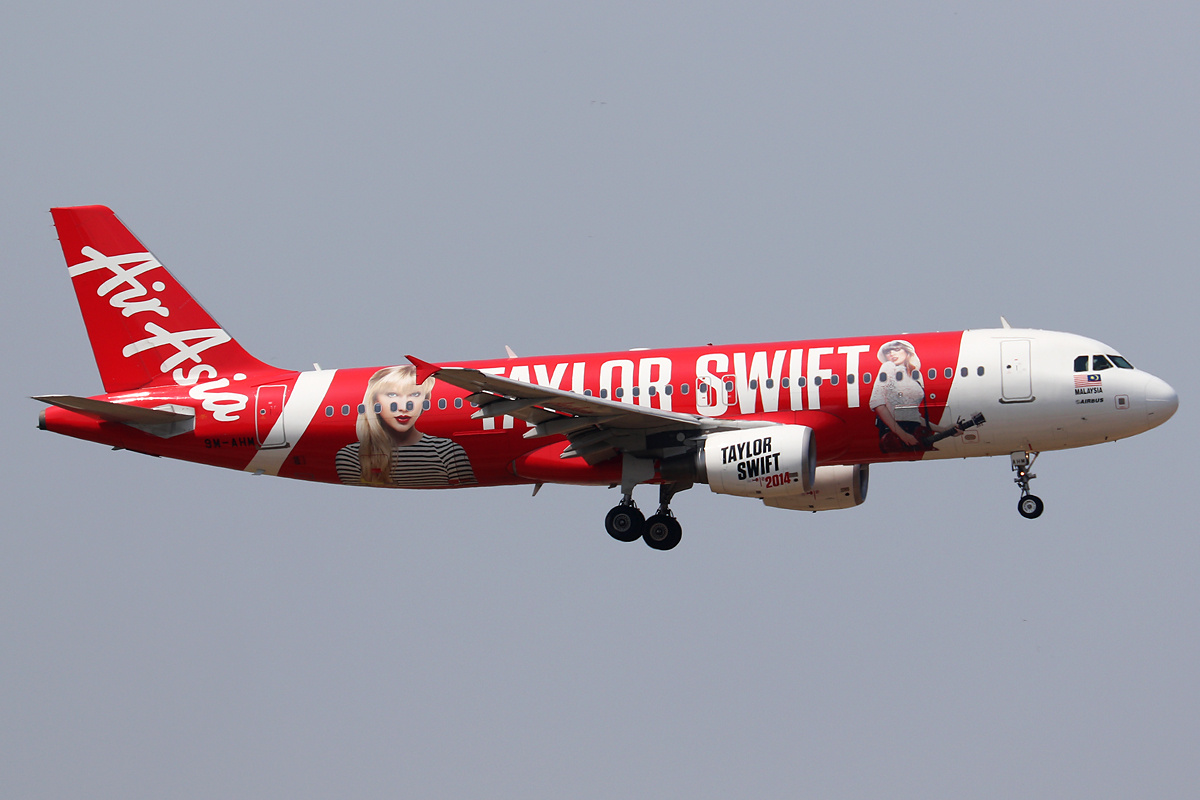
An AirAsia Airbus A320 celebrating Swift's arrival to Kuala Lumpur for her first ever concert in Malaysia in 2014

Swift embraces corporate sponsors. Her marketing incorporates strategic business partnerships with companies, which were once regarded as a "taboo" among musicians. Marketing expert Christopher Ming wrote, "Sure, working with brands like Apple Music, Elizabeth Arden, and Diet Coke feel like no-brainers. But it takes a certain amount of marketing ingenuity to make campaigns with NCAA Football, United Postal Service [sic], and Papa John's work. Yet they all did." Swift promoted Red (Taylor's Version) and 1989 (Taylor's Version) using Starbucks and Google Search, respectively. Journalists stated that the impact of her album releases is "felt across social media", with brands and companies often endorsing her to capitalize on her "momentum", leveraging her cultural relevance.

== Industry and economy ==
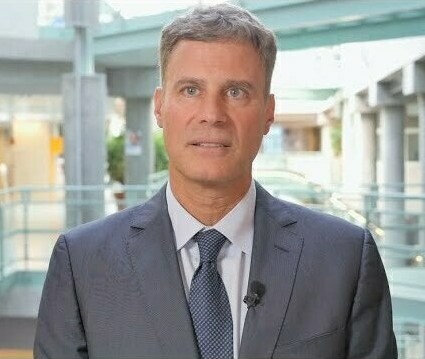
Economist Alan Krueger devised his concept "rockonomics"—a microeconomic analysis of the music industry—using Swift, whom he considered an "economic genius".

The economic impact of Swift's career has been termed as Swiftonomics. Abrdn's Bred Wilhite considers Swiftonomics a branch of economics that deals with the intersection of consumer emotions and capitalism. Economists and industry academics have studied Swift's macroeconomic influence on businesses worldwide, comparing her to countries. According to trade publication Pollstar, if Swift were a country, she would be the 199th largest economy on earth, analogous to a small Caribbean nation. Katie Atkinson of Billboard equated Swift's 2023 earnings (an estimated $2 billion) to the gross domestic product (GDP) of East Timor. QuestionPro estimated her 2023 economy at $5 billion, higher than the GDP of 50 countries. According to critic Kitty Empire, Swift is a "geopolitical and macroeconomic disruptor". She has also had a microeconomic impact, benefitting various small businesses. MarketWatch termed Swift's influence on markets as "the Taylor Swift stock-market effect".

Swift's tours are channels of "economic enrichment". According to author Peggy Noonan, Swift altered "the rules of entertainment economics". Analyses of her economic impact includes studying the "booming" economy around her concert tours, which escalates travel, lodging, cosmetic, fashion, and food businesses, and tourism revenues of cities by millions of dollars. Vogue Business dubbed Swift a "global socioeconomic phenomenon".

=== Challenging industry norms ===
Swift has been instrumental in reforming the business aspects of music, often considered a flag-bearer for artists' rights. Journalists praise her ability to question industry practices, noting how her moves changed streaming platform policies, prompted awareness of intellectual property among upcoming musicians, reshaped the concert ticket model, and negotiated better financial compensations from labels for all music artists. Elle described the Swift-enabled reforms to streaming services as "a milestone moment in the history of music".

==== Streaming reforms ====
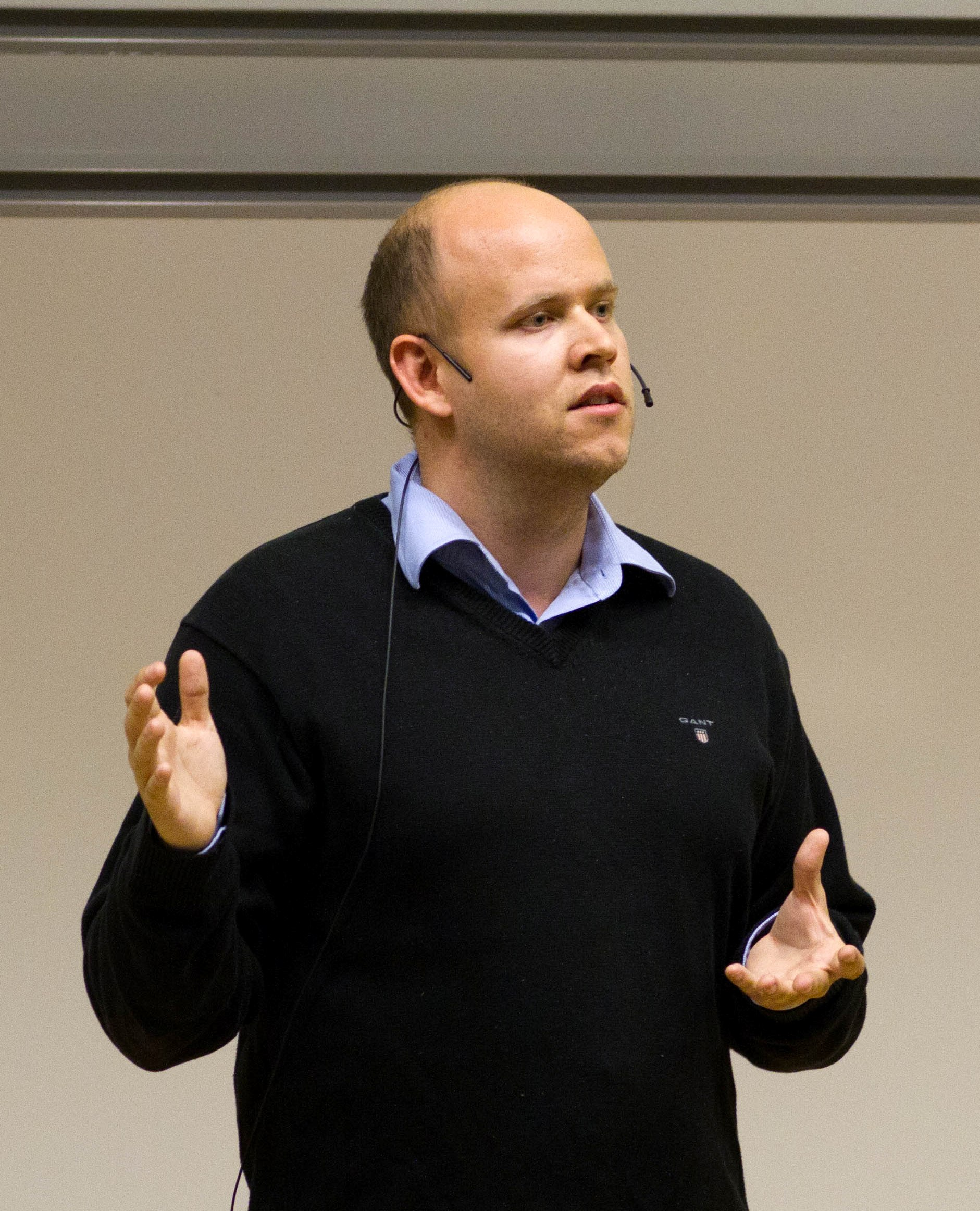
Spotify CEO Daniel Ek convinced Swift to return to Spotify after she released 1989 to wide commercial success without the platform.

Swift contested music streaming services to regulate corporate policies for better preservation of artistic integrity. She said digital streaming services have become a dominant form of media consumption since 2013, causing a gradual decline in traditional album sales. In November 2014, Swift announced that 1989, her then-upcoming album, would not be released on Spotify, which was growing in popularity at the time, in protest of the platform's "minuscule" payment to artists (US$0.006 to 0.0084 per stream). In an op-ed for The Wall Street Journal, she expressed her belief that the value of works of art should be fixed by artists:

"Music is art, and art is important and rare. Important, rare things are valuable. Valuable things should be paid for. It's my opinion that music should not be free, and my prediction is that individual artists and their labels will someday decide what an album's price point is. I hope they don't underestimate themselves or undervalue their art."

Karim R. Lakhani and Marco Iansiti, business administration professors at Harvard Business School, reviewed the issue and upheld Swift's belief that musicians should set the prices. For academic Jessica Searle, Swift proposed music as a "non public good". Nilay Patel, writing for Vox, criticized Swift's beliefs about albums and said she "doesn't understand supply and demand"; Patel stated that the internet has "killed" the album format, claiming most consumers would not shop for a Swift CD anymore. Eventually, Swift withdrew her entire discography from Spotify, prompting it to say "We hope she'll change her mind and join us in building a new music economy that works for everyone." 1989 was a commercial success upon release, and another Vox journalist Constance Grady regarded this a "major blow" for Spotify, which attempted to bring Swift back by releasing playlists dedicated to Swift. Her music stayed off Spotify for nearly three years, until Swift released it back on June 9, 2017, in celebration of Swift's milestone 100 million certified units from the Recording Industry Association of America (RIAA). Spotify CEO Daniel Ek stated on CBS This Morning that he convinced Swift to bring her music back on Spotify by meeting her in Nashville, "explaining the model, why streaming mattered", and how her fans want her music back on Spotify.

In June 2015, Swift wrote an open letter to Apple Inc. on Tumblr, addressing the three-month free trial that Apple Music had chosen to offer their users while not paying the artists whose catalogs are streamed by users during the trial period. Swift said she finds it "shocking" that they had opted not to pay "writers, producers, or artists" for the three months. She explained:

"This is not about me. This is about the new artist or band that has just released their first single and will not be paid for its success. This is about the young songwriter who just got his or her first cut and thought that the royalties from that would get them out of debt. This is about the producer who works tirelessly to innovate and create, just like the innovators and creators at Apple are pioneering in their field...but will not get paid for a quarter of a year's worth of plays on his or her songs. ... Three months is a long time to go unpaid, and it is unfair to ask anyone to work for nothing. We don't ask you for free iPhones. Please don't ask us to provide you with our music for no compensation."

Swift asserted 1989 would not be on Apple Music either and urged the company to change the policy before its launch on June 30, 2015. Eddy Cue, an Apple executive, apologized and promised to reverse the policy. Cue told Associated Press, "When I woke up this morning and I saw Taylor's note that she had written, it solidified that we needed to make a change." When Apple Music officially launched, it paid royalties to artists during the three-month trial. Various musicians, music organizations and industry commentators expressed their gratitude to Swift.

Following the expiration of her six-album Big Machine contract in 2018, Swift signed a new global contract with Republic Records, a label owned by Universal Music Group. She revealed that, as part of the contract, any sale of Universal's shares in Spotify would result in non-recoupable equity shares for all Universal artists. Grady called it a huge promise from Universal "far from assured" until Swift interceded. Financial Times's Jamie Powell said, "Swift, on her own, is as powerful as an entire union", and dubbed the equity negotiation "Comrade Swift's special dividend". Yang opined that it demonstrated "the full weight of Swift's power: In an unprecedented move that seals her status as a kind of joan of arc for creator rights". In 2023, American businessman Elon Musk asked Swift to release her music or concert videos to Twitter; highlighting the pleas of Ek, Cue and Musk, Fast Company opined Swift is "arguably the most powerful person in tech".

==== Intellectual property ====
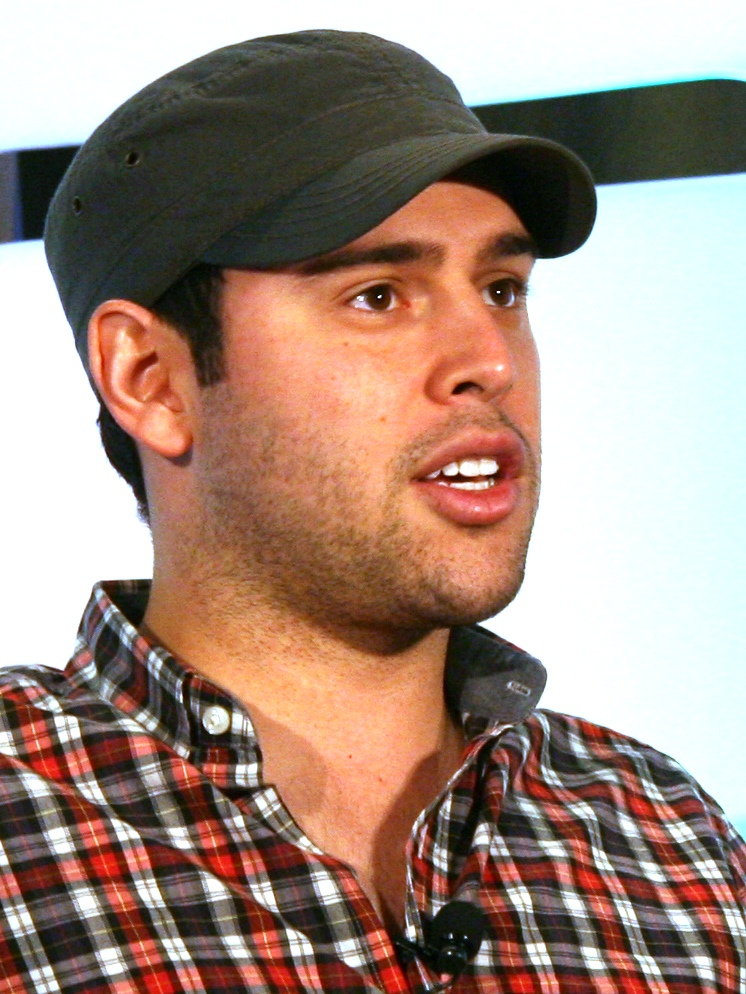
Swift's dispute with Scooter Braun has been credited with bringing widespread awareness of masters to the public.

Swift's "battle" against exploitative recording contracts for the ownership of her masters has been described as "revolutionary". In June 2019, after Swift moved to Republic Records, Braun acquired Big Machine for $330 million, making him the owner of all the Big Machine masters, including those of Swift's first six studio albums. Swift responded she attempted to purchase the masters but was offered unfavorable conditions, while Borchetta claimed she declined a chance to purchase them. Swift alleged the label blocked her from performing her music at the 2019 American Music Awards, and claimed Borchetta and Braun were "exercising tyrannical control" over her. Big Machine then released Live from Clear Channel Stripped 2008 (2020), an unreleased live album by Swift, without due diligence. The controversy was highly publicized, becoming one of the most widely discussed and covered news topics of 2020 and 2021. Evening Standard called it "music's biggest feud".

Re-recording the albums was the only viable option to gain full ownership of her music, as per Swift. Braun sold the masters in October 2020 to Shamrock Holdings for $405 million under the condition he would continue profiting. Swift disapproved again, rejected a Shamrock offer for equity partnership, and began releasing the re-recordings via Republic. The re-recorded albums were met with critical and commercial success, breaking multiple commercial records. When "All Too Well (10 Minute Version)" became the longest song ever to top the Hot 100, Jack Antonoff, the song's producer and a frequent collaborator of Swift, told Rolling Stone that a 10-minute-long song topping the Hot 100 teaches artists to "not listen" to what the industry has to say.

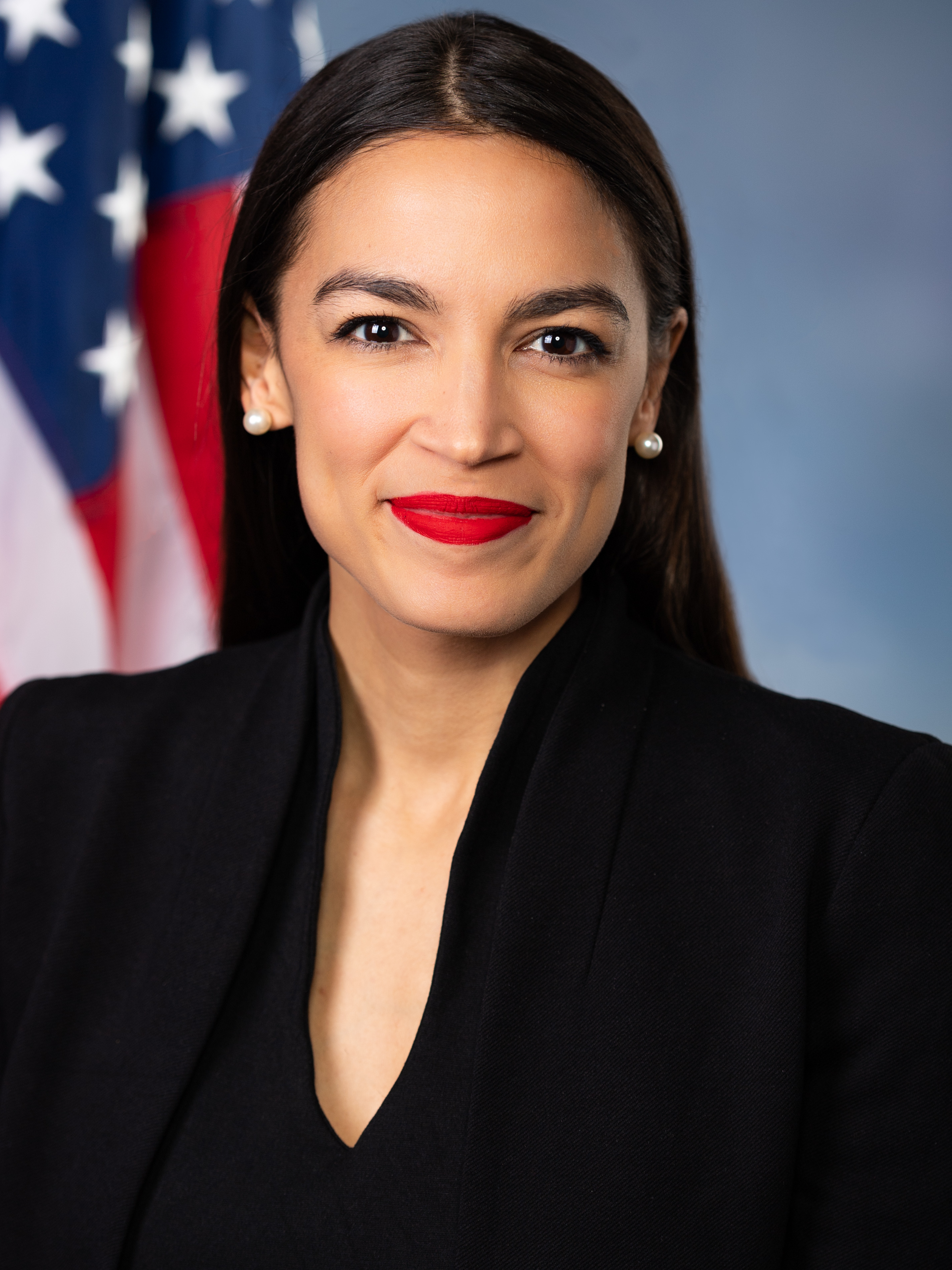
Alexandria Ocasio-Cortez contextualized the masters dispute as part of the subjugation of creative industries in the U.S. by private equity firms.

Numerous music artists, politicians, journalists and legal experts supported Swift's actions regarding the issue, deeming it trailblazing and inspirational. Publications observed, while the issue of master ownership and conflicts between labels and artists such as Prince, the Beatles, Janet Jackson, and Def Leppard have been prevalent earlier, Swift was one of the few to make it a public discourse on artists' rights, private equity and industry ethics. Dubbing the dispute one of the 50 "most important moments" of the 2010s decade, Rolling Stone journalists noted Swift's role in shifting the public perception of the concept of re-recording or re-mastering. Dominic Rushe of The Guardian said Swift's battle marked a change in the digital music era, with artists more aware of their rights without the need to rely on record labels anymore. Pitchfork critic Sam Sodomsky recognized the visibility she brought, saying Swift "can enact change by wielding the leverage of the reliability of her success" and that it is "financially lucrative for the industry to listen" when she speaks.

Unlike most artists when faced with this kind of injustice, Swift could stand up for herself, and in doing so, invoke meaningful dialogue and inspire change within the notoriously slow-moving music industry ... Re-recording a back catalog of six full albums and respective secret bonus tracks, then developing a hugely successful campaign to drive loyal fans towards the new versions of their beloved albums—and away from the original master recordings, prompting a dip in streams that will be mimicked in the rights holders' income statement—is something only very, very few artists can do. Taylor Swift is, indeed, amongst that handful.

— Journalist Eilish Gilligan, Refinery29

The A.V. Club and MarketWatch interpreted Swift's statements as a criticism of private equity, highlighting The Carlyle Group, one of Braun's investors. U.S. Congress members like Elizabeth Warren and Alexandria Ocasio-Cortez backed Swift and stated that she is "one of many" creative businesses threatened by private equity firms that harm the U.S. economy. Music attorney James Sammataro observed that "any time Taylor brings attention to an issue, it gets magnified ... She has a very loud megaphone and she's not afraid to use it. She's had great success in effectuating change." Billboard declared the outcomes of the re-recording venture unprecedented. Kornhaber opined that the re-recordings disproved critics who doubted Swift. When Swift successfully reclaimed her masters in May 2025, Sheffield declared that "Swift owning her life's work is a historic victory with enormous ramifications for other artists, and the entire music world."

==== Distribution models ====
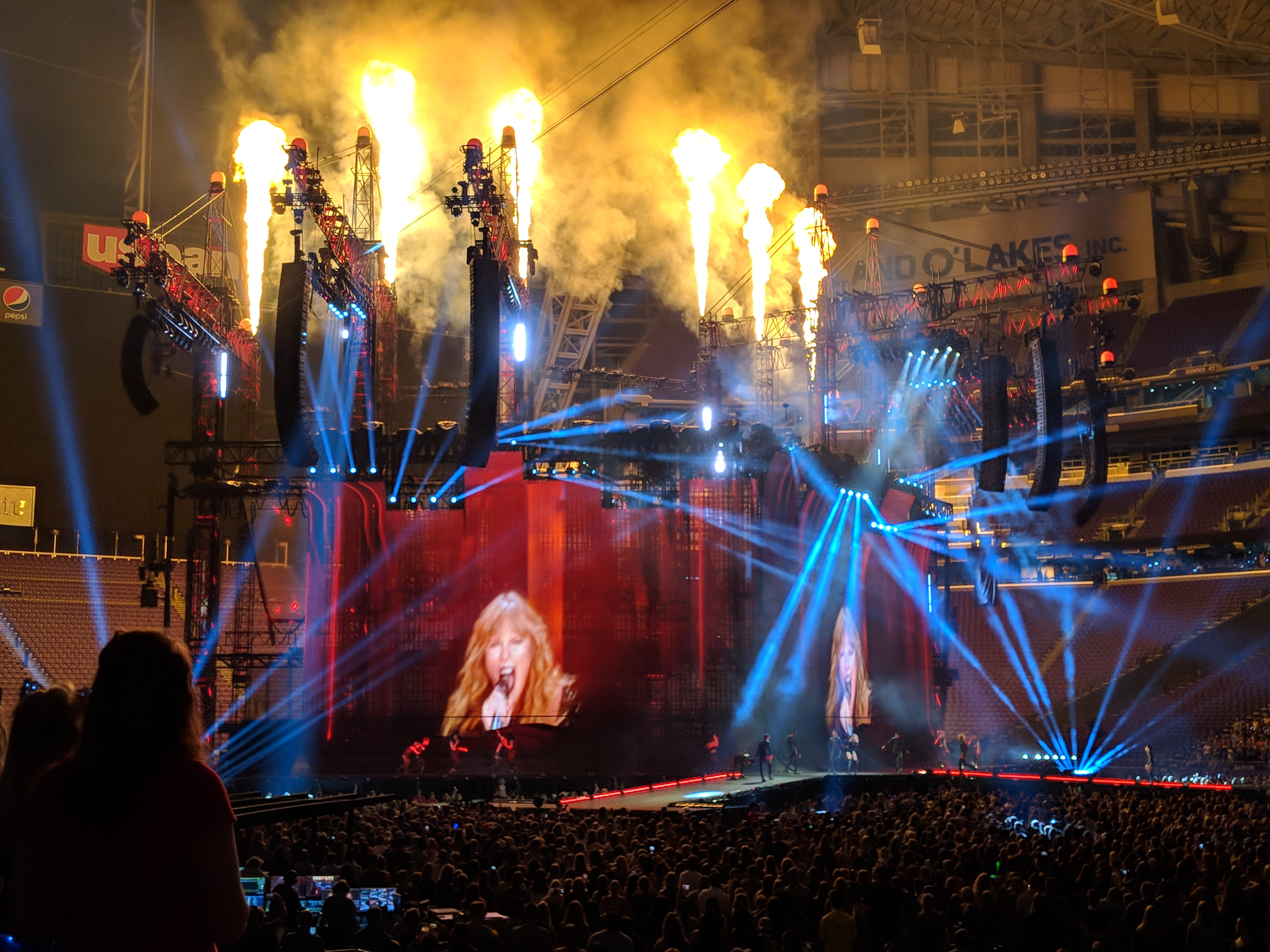
Inspired by Swift's Reputation Stadium Tour (2018), the concert industry adopted the "slow ticketing" model.

The concert industry shifted to a "slow ticketing model" after Swift, who is known for her stadium concerts and commercial "dominance of the touring industry", first implemented it with the Reputation Stadium Tour (2018). It replaced the selling-out of tickets in minutes with a demand-driven ticketing approach that requires consumers to register in advance and allowed them to purchase tickets at any time and price level upon access. This meant higher ticket prices in the beginning and a gradual drop as the concert date approached, replacing "momentum with consumer choice and experience" and bypassing scalpers, according to David Marcus of Ticketmaster. The model was initially criticized by journalists, who thought it was an attempt at camouflaging Swift's dull ticket sales following her unfavorable press in 2016; however, the tour was a sold-out success, surpassing the Beatles to become the highest grossing North American tour of all time, after which critics favored the model.

In November 2022, the pre-sale of the U.S. leg of the Eras Tour was mismanaged by Ticketmaster, attracting widespread public and political criticism. Due to the "astronomical" demand for tickets, with 3.5 million people registering for the on-sale program, the Ticketmaster website crashed within an hour of sale but still sold 2.4 million tickets, breaking the record for the most concert tickets sold by an artist in a single day. Ticketmaster attributed the crash to "historically unprecedented" site traffic. Fans and consumer groups accused Ticketmaster of deceit and monopoly. Several members of U.S. Congress claimed that Ticketmaster and its parent company Live Nation Entertainment should be separated as their merger led to substandard service and higher ticket prices. The U.S. Department of Justice opened investigations into Live Nation–Ticketmaster and sued them, alongside several fans who also sued separately for intentional deception, fraud, price fixing, and antitrust law violations. Bipartisan members of the U.S. Senate Judiciary Committee censured the companies at a hearing. Under pressure from the National Economic Council, Ticketmaster and other ticketing companies agreed to terminate junk fees—additional fees revealed at the end of ticket purchases. American legal scholar William Kovacic termed it the "Taylor Swift policy adjustment."

For the 2023 concert film of the Eras Tour, Swift adopted an unconventional release strategy that partnered with movie theaters to bypass the major film studios; critics viewed the move as an alternative to the distributor-exhibitor model of the film industry. She also broke the Universal Music Group (UMG) boycott of TikTok by putting her music back on the platform after the label group pulled the songs of its artists roster due to a lack of agreement between the companies; UMG subsequently signed a deal with TikTok. The Washington Post proclaimed Swift has "an unbreakable hold on our increasingly fractured world—and its discourse—in a way that almost no one else can."

== Media, fashion, and politics ==
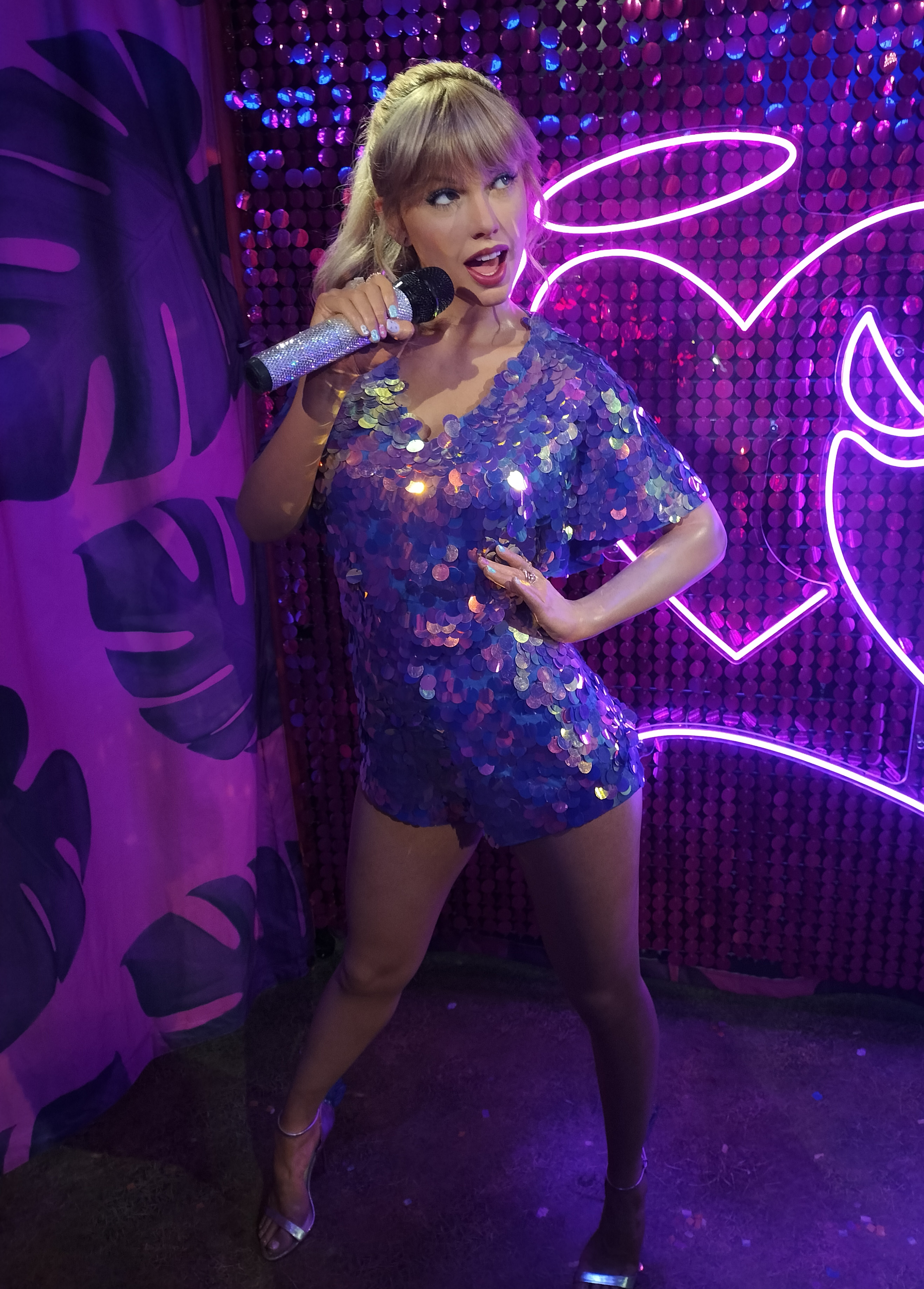
Swift's wax figure at the Madame Tussauds museum in London

Swift is widely covered in mass media, which has generated a range of public perceptions of her. She and her music have been referenced or used in numerous books, films, and television shows. A subject of rampant scrutiny in the press, her relationship with the mainstream media has been described by critics as an example of the celebrity–industrial complex. Swift is considered "polarizing", receiving both favorable and unfavorable press throughout her career.

She is regarded as a feminist figure. She has criticized the way media depicts women, as her dating life and disputes have attracted tabloid scrutiny and widespread online attention. She has been vocal about the impact of press coverage on personal health, discussing issues such as eating disorders, self-esteem, and cyberbullying; various academics and journalists have opined that Swift's openness regarding these topics are crucial for raising mental health awareness.

Additionally, Swift is often dubbed a millennial cultural figure, as well as a fashion influencer. The evolution of her style has been the subject of media coverage and analysis. She has reinvented her image and aesthetic throughout her career, matching respective album cycles with distinct themes, impacting fashion trends in the process. Her street style, in particular, has received acclaim.

Authors regard Swift as the most powerful music personality in American politics, having used her fame to incite political action. Various surveys have deemed her a deciding factor in elections, one that can bridge the polarization in American politics. Swift has inspired a number of legislative proposals and laws.

== Fandom ==
Swift's fanbase, the Swifties, have been the subject of journalistic and academic interest; critical analysis of Swift is referred to as "Swiftology" in the media. Authors have described the relationship between Swift and Swifties as post-postmodern consumerism. Journalists dub the fan frenzy, generally termed "Swiftmania", as the 21st-century equivalent to Beatlemania. Some opined that Swift turned pop music into a "multiplayer puzzle" with a fanbase commitment that other artists have subsequently attempted to reproduce. Swift is a source of myth in popular culture; journalists describe her works, celebrity, and the fanfare surrounding them as a media universe and subculture on its own.

== Creative inspiration ==
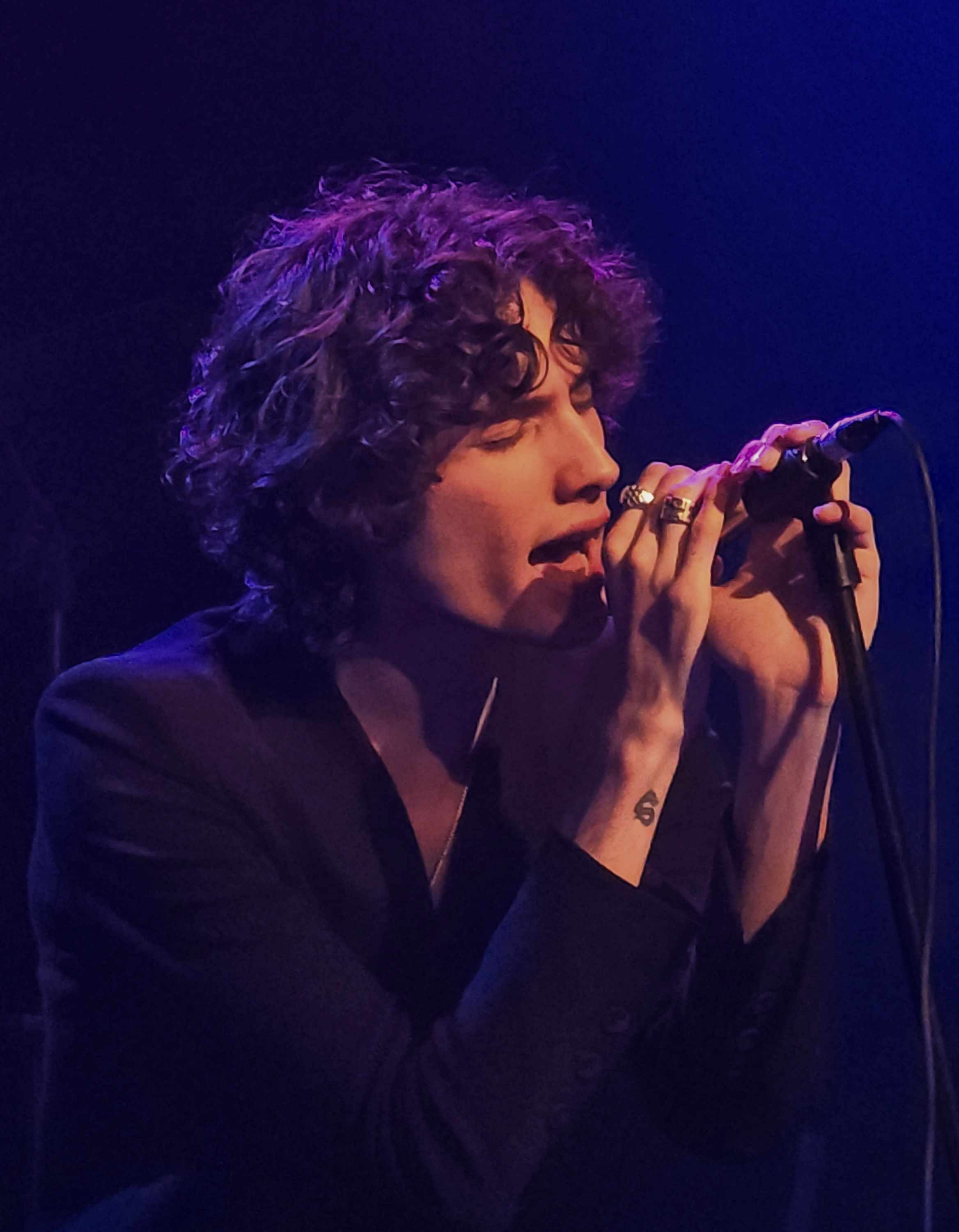
Sombr

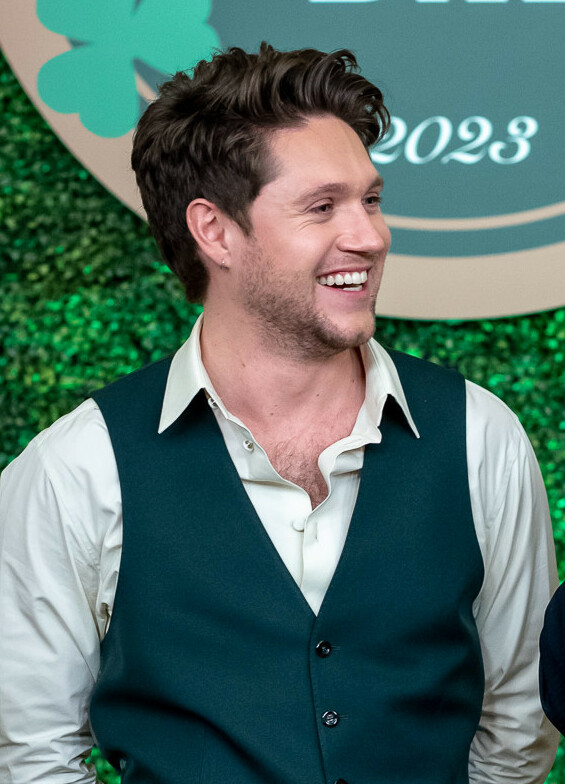
Niall Horan

Troye Sivan

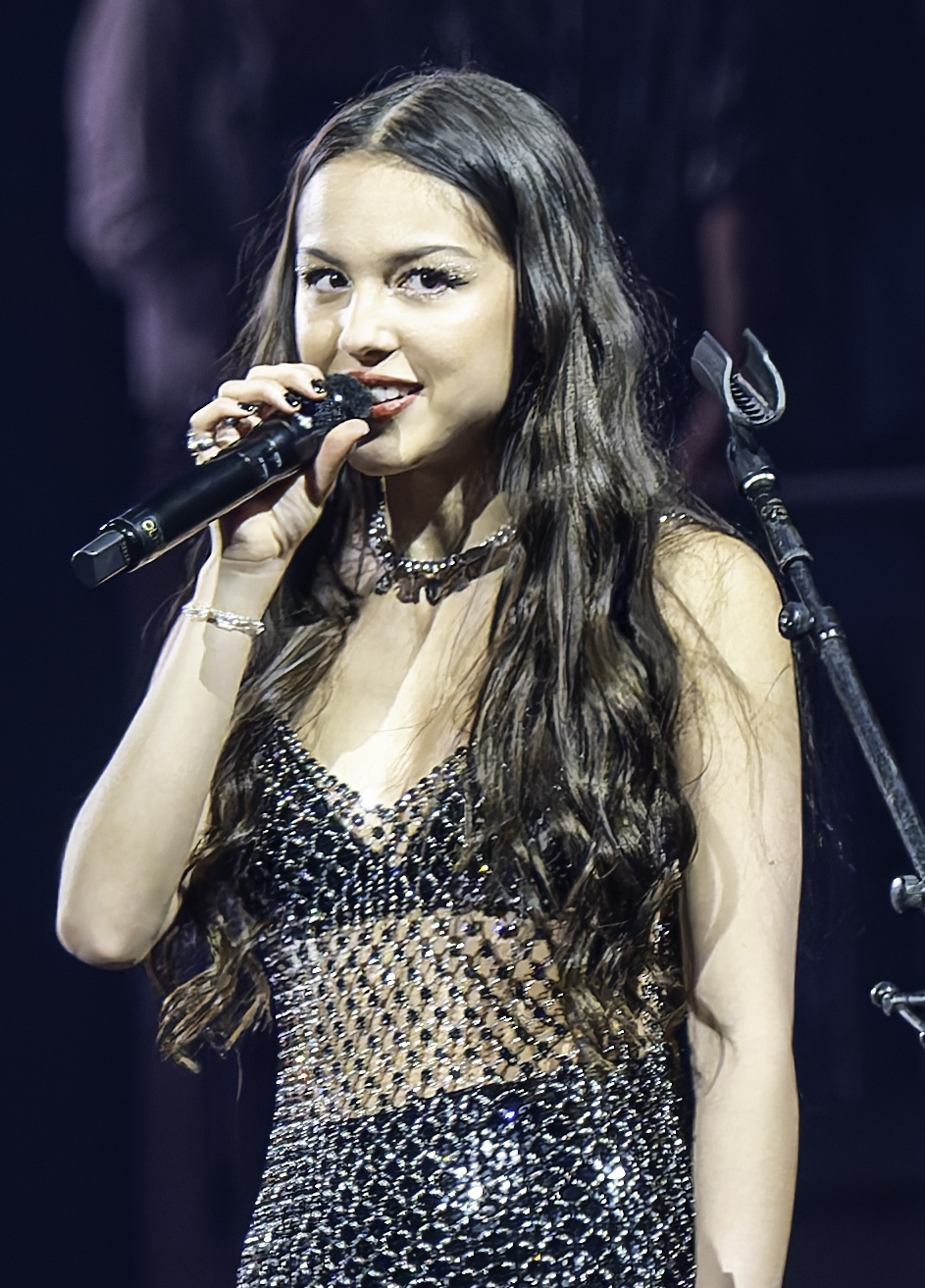
Olivia Rodrigo

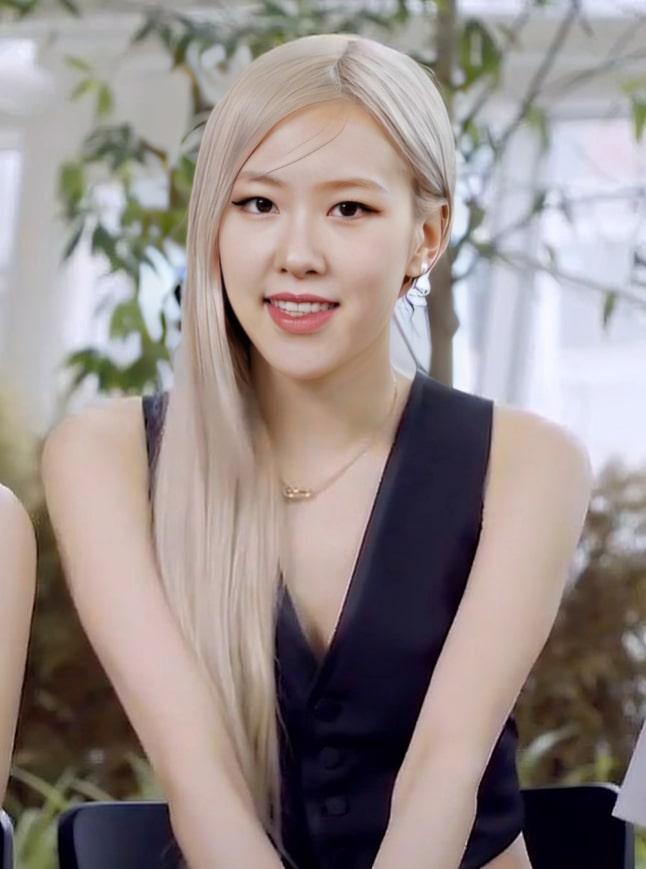
Rosé

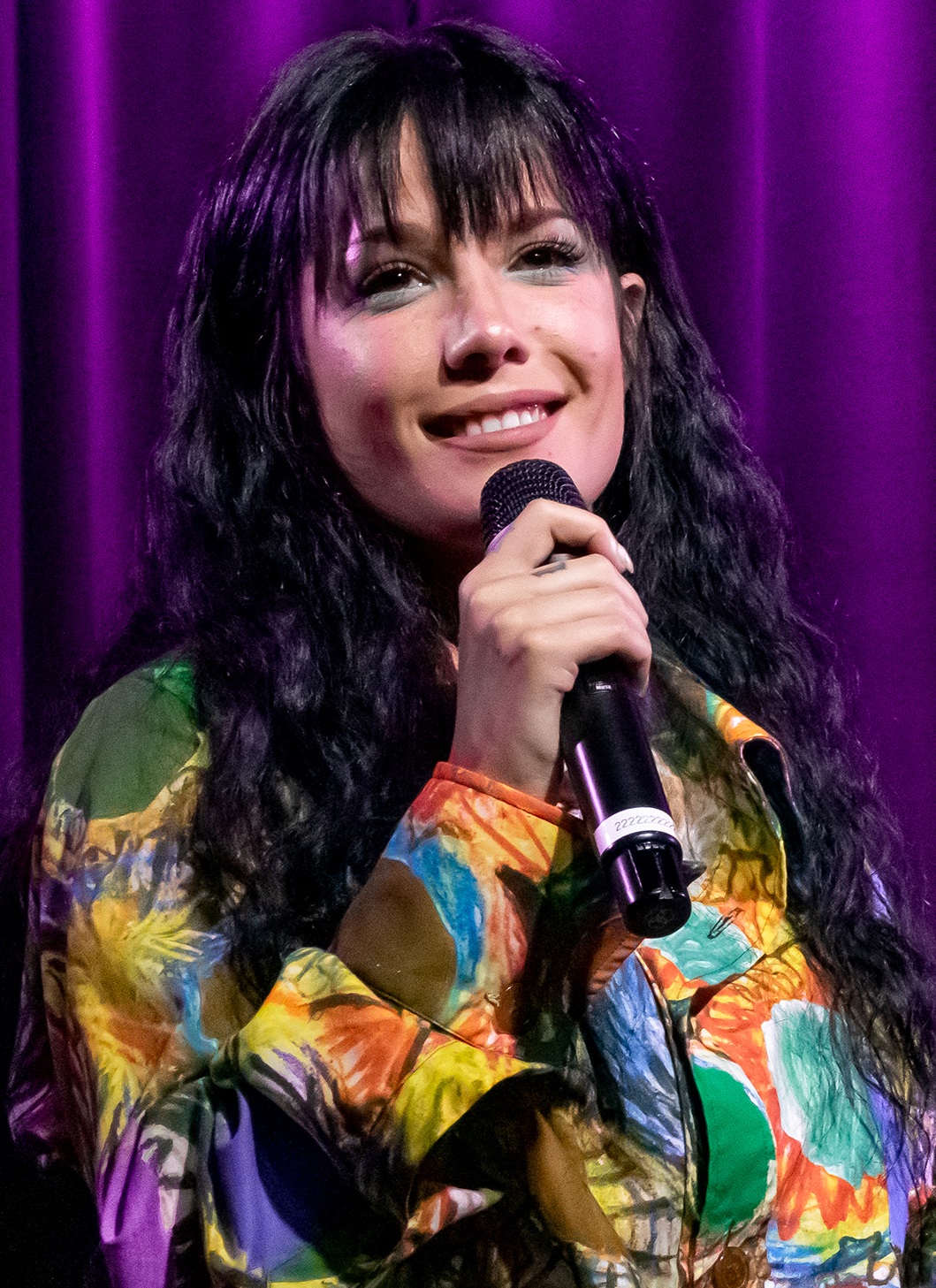
Halsey

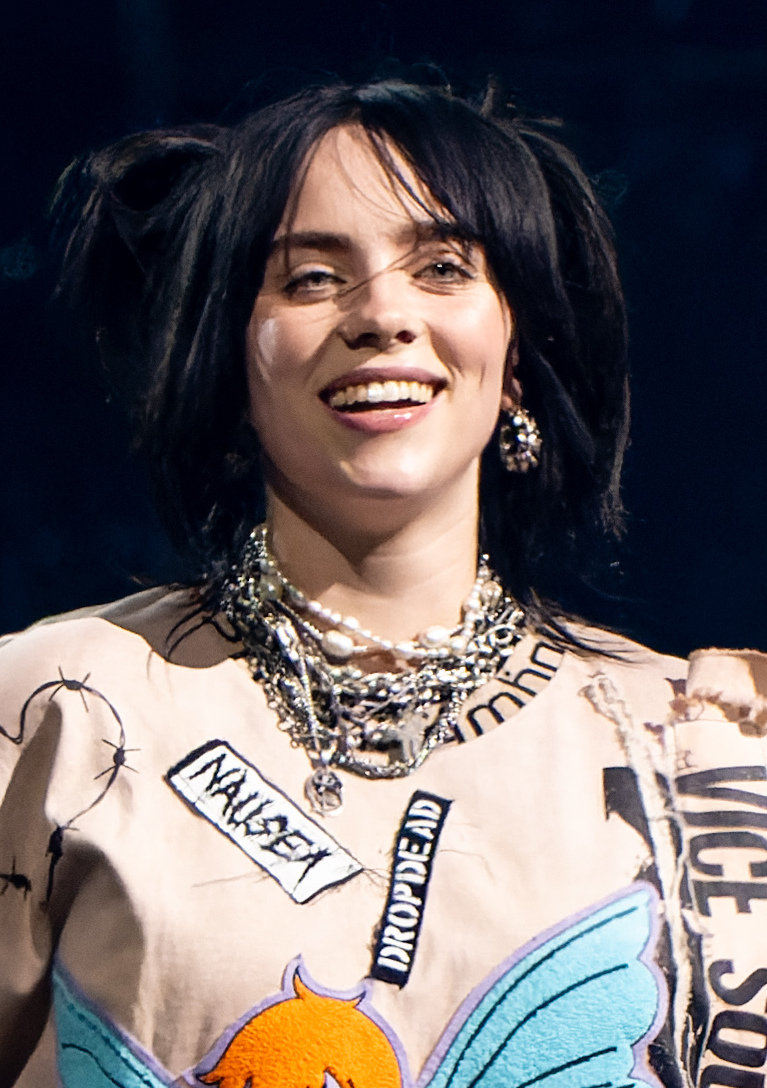
Billie Eilish

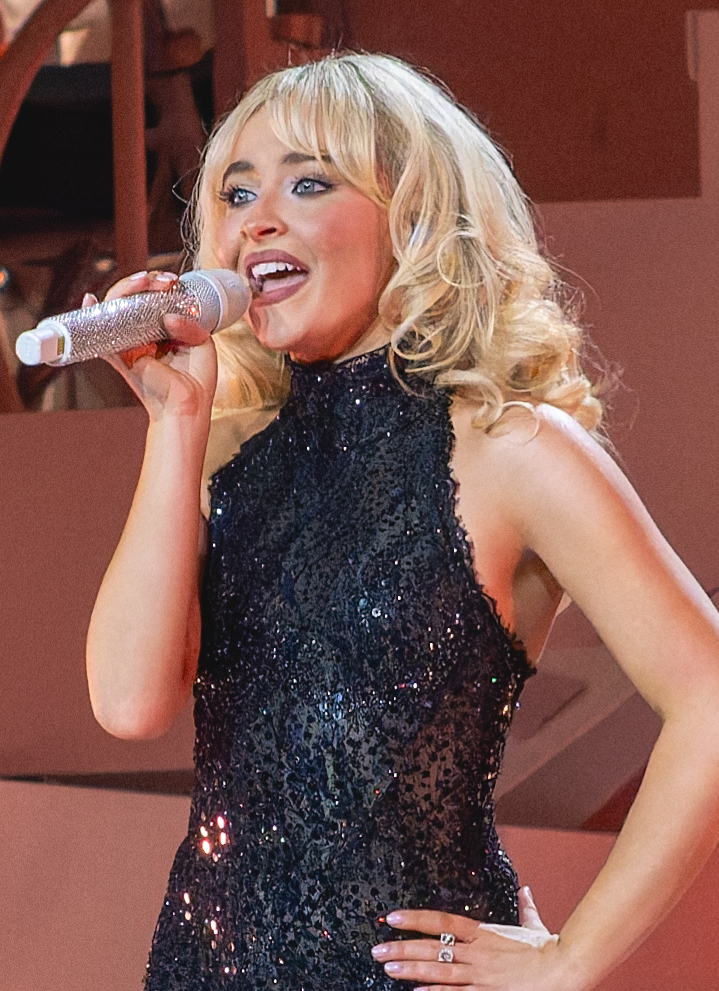
Sabrina Carpenter

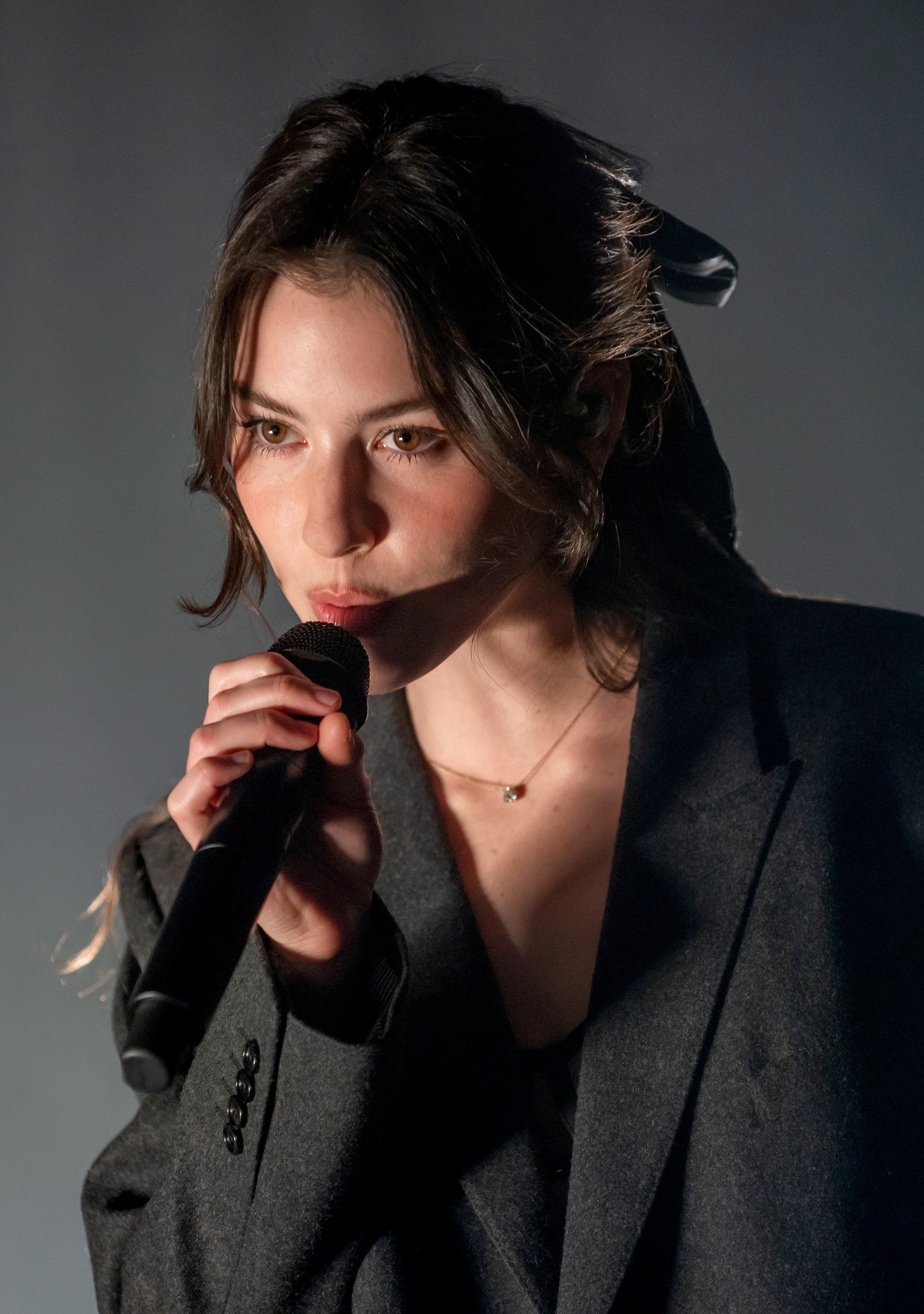
Gracie Abrams

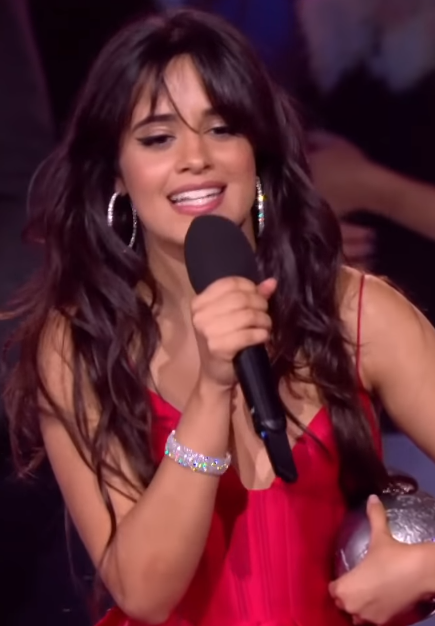
Camila Cabello

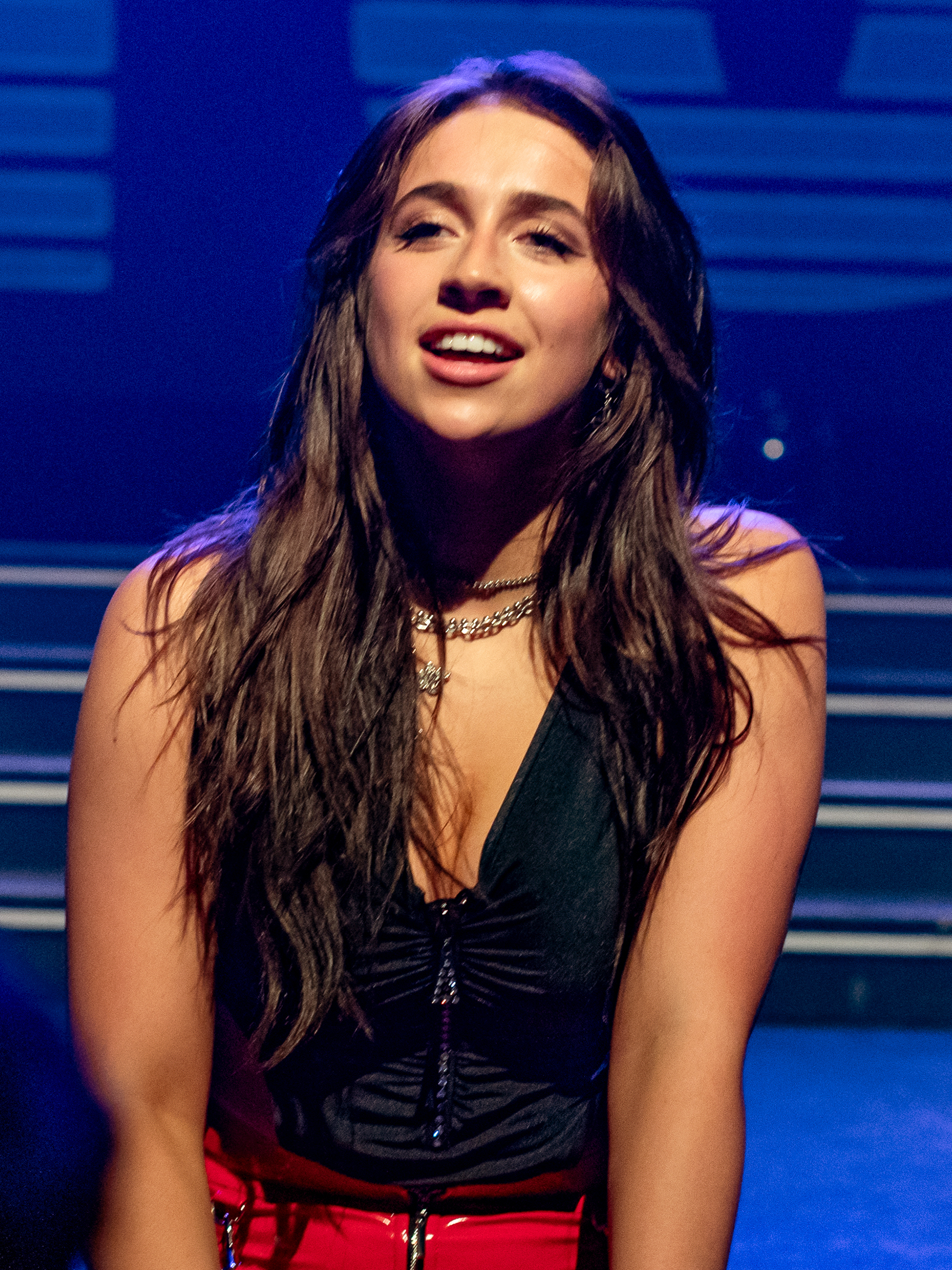
Tate McRae

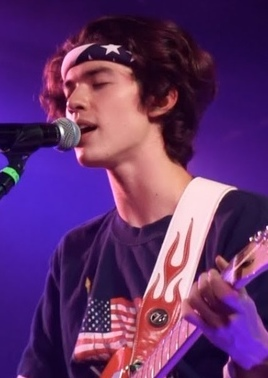
Conan Gray

Swift has influenced a generation of artists, including those pictured above.

Swift has influenced numerous music artists across genres since her debut. Critics began noticing her influence on popular music in 2013, and credit her albums with inspiring an entire generation of singer-songwriters. Paul McCartney was inspired by Swift's artistry and fans to write the 2018 song "Who Cares". Other acts who cited Swift as an influence include:

- 5 Seconds of Summer
- Gracie Abrams
- Adele
- After
- Baby Queen
- Bahjat
- Black Eyed Peas
- Kelsea Ballerini
- Bernadya
- Priscilla Block
- Phoebe Bridgers
- Bailey Bryan
- Camila Cabello
- Sabrina Carpenter
- Sofia Carson
- Clairo
- Devon Cole
- Gus Dapperton
- Billie Eilish
- Ellis
- Fletcher
- Florrie
- Gayle
- Girl in Red
- Selena Gomez
- Ellie Goulding
- Mckenna Grace
- Conan Gray
- Loren Gray
- Griff
- Halsey
- Maya Hawke
- Niall Horan
- Huh Yunjin
- Lilas Ikuta
- Jax
- Ruston Kelly
- Kim Chaewon
- Laufey
- Lily
- Little Mix
- LØLØ
- Atsuko Maeda
- Catherine McGrath
- Tate McRae
- Shawn Mendes
- Nell Mescal
- Megan Moroney
- Maren Morris
- The National
- Nina Nesbitt
- Niki
- Finneas O'Connell
- Christina Perri
- Maisie Peters
- Addison Rae
- Gretta Ray
- The Regrettes
- Renforshort
- Freya Ridings
- Olivia Rodrigo
- Maggie Rogers
- Ruann
- Rina Sawayama
- Rosé
- Shamir
- Troye Sivan
- Slayyyter
- Soccer Mommy
- Sombr
- Hailee Steinfeld
- Tegan and Sara
- Janani K. Jha
- KT Tunstall
- Tzuyu
- The Vamps
- Hana Vu
- Waterparks
- Wild Pink
- Hayley Williams
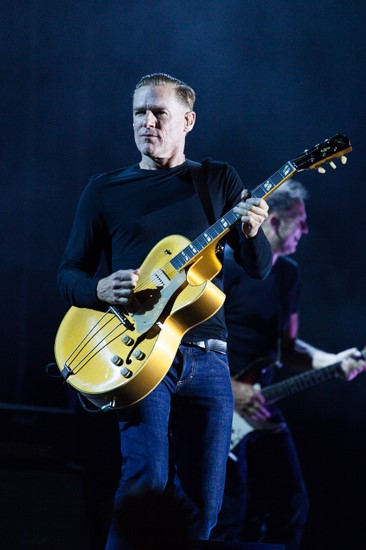
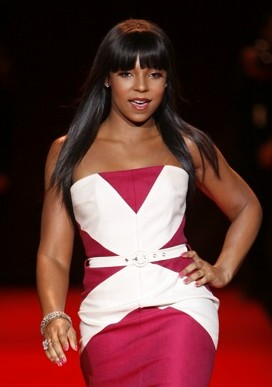
Artists ranging from Bryan Adams (left) to Ashanti (right) found Swift's creative ownership inspiring.

Various musicians were inspired by aspects of Swift's career, such as her work ethic and appeal. Swift's comments on artists' rights influenced Bryan Adams, Ashanti, Yeng Constantino, the Departed, Snoop Dogg, Five Finger Death Punch, John Fogerty, Paris Hilton, Joe Jonas, Zara Larsson, Bonnie McKee, Niki, Offset, Rachel Platten, Rita Ora, Rodrigo, and SZA. Ashanti and SZA commended Swift for her industry-challenging, creative and business decisions.

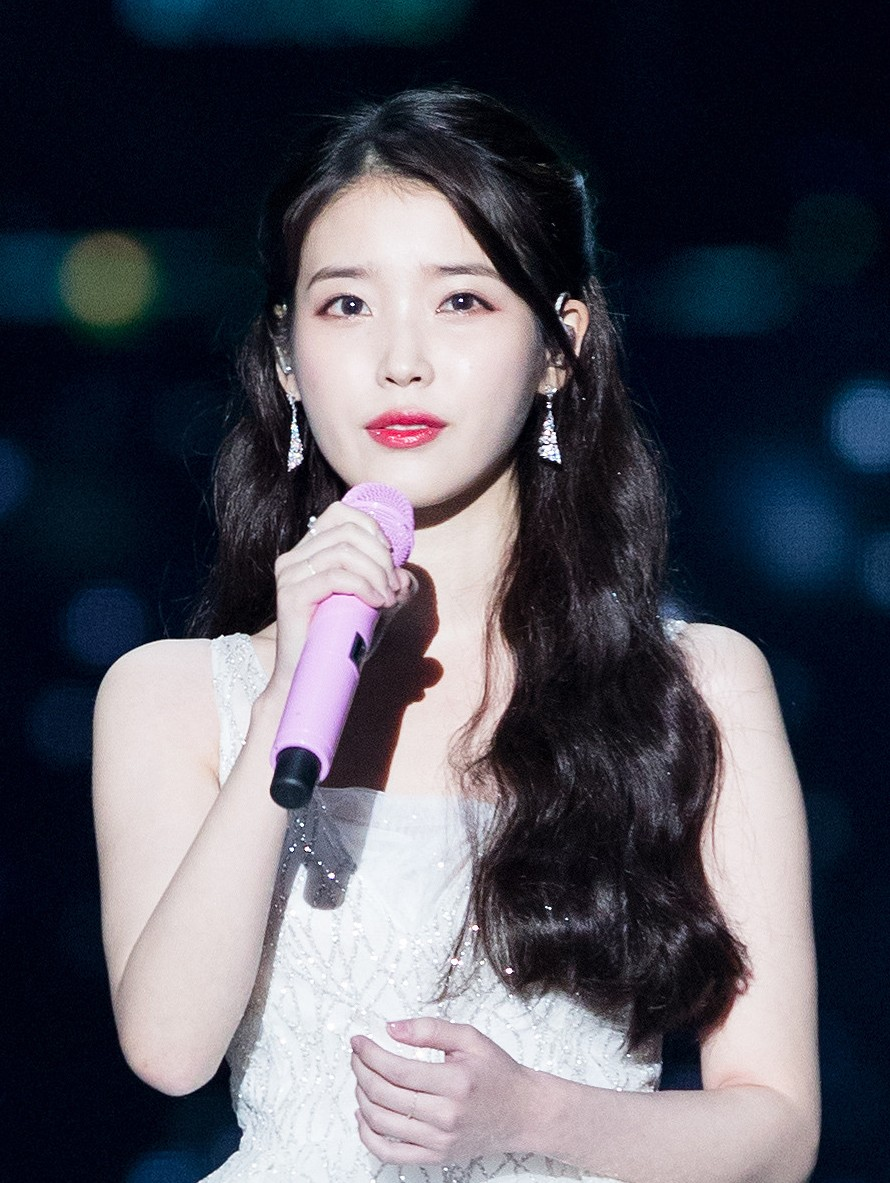
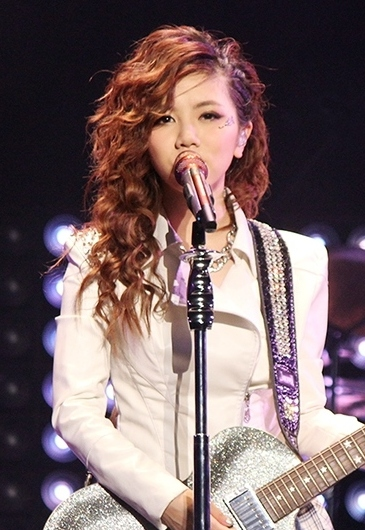
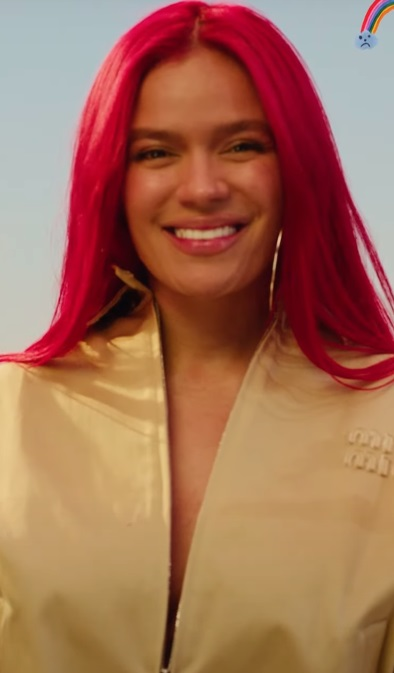
South Korean musician IU (left), Hong Kong artist G.E.M. (middle) and Colombian singer Karol G (right) are dubbed as "Taylor Swift of K-pop", "Chinese Taylor Swift" and "Colombia's Taylor Swift", respectively, as their artistry and career trajectory resemble Swift's.

Swift has been the most covered artist since the 2010s, replacing the Beatles, who were the most covered artist from the 1960s to the 2000s. Singing competition television series such as The Voice and American Idol have dedicated episodes entirely to Swift's discography. She also has been referenced or mentioned in songs by other artists. Examples include Eminem's "Killshot", Drake's "Red Button" and "Taylor Made Freestyle", Kanye West's "Famous" and "Carnival", ASAP Rocky's "Tailor Swif", Cupcakke's "Marge Simpson", Fletcher's "Her Body is Bible", "Award Show Taylor Swift" by Bowling for Soup, "I Wish (Taylor Swift)" by the Knocks, "Total Entertainment Forever" by Father John Misty, Kitty's "Orion's Belt", Zahara's "Taylor", and Evan Taubenfeld's "Merry Swiftmas".

=== Beyond music ===
Outside the music industry, Swift has inspired authors, novelists, film directors, and screenwriters, including Sina Grace (Superman: The Harvests of Youth), Jenny Han (The Summer I Turned Pretty), Abby McDonald (Bridgerton), Jennifer Kaytin Robinson (Someone Great and Do Revenge), and Jac Schaeffer (WandaVision and Agatha All Along). Shawn Levy compared Swift with Steven Spielberg, described her as "a culture magnet unlike anything I've seen". Spielberg himself described Swift a "singular" cultural phenomenon rivaling the Great American Songbook, Lennon–McCartney in the 1960s, and the 1970s singer-songwriters like Carole King, Stevie Nicks, and James Taylor. Guillermo del Toro opined, Swift is "a very accomplished director, she's incredibly articulate and deep about what she's trying to do—and what she will do." At the Academy Museum of Motion Pictures, Conan O'Brien said Swift is "John, Paul, George and Ringo all in one." Shonda Rhimes praised Swift's generational cultural impact, Ryan Murphy said she is "one of the greats", and Oprah Winfrey dubbed her "the true great role model". Writers of various romance and young adult books have been inspired by Swift's songs.

Taylor Swift is the closest thing we have to the godhead in [the United States]. We only live by her good graces. She is the essence of the life force. She's keeping us together. If Taylor were to leave us, everything would fall apart.

— American filmmaker Paul Schrader on Swift's cultural impact, Polygon

A number of actors, such as Elisabeth Moss, Sarah Snook and Park Eun-bin, have drawn inspiration from Swift; American actress Sadie Sink said Swift is among the people who shaped her professionally, helping her step into mature and emotionally complex roles as an actress. Swift has inspired impersonators such as Ashley Leechin, Jade Jolie, and Taylor Sheesh, and fictional characters, such as the music stars Lady Raven from Trap (2024), Skye Riley from Smile 2 (2024), and the titular Mother Mary (2026).

== Scholarly interest ==
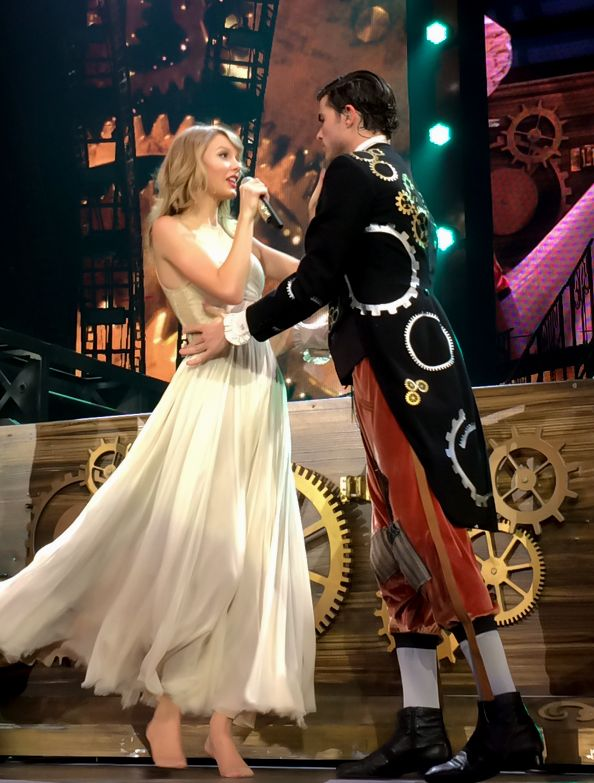
Swift performing "Love Story" (2008) at the Red Tour (2014) in London

Swift is a subject of academic research. Her artistry, fame, entrepreneurship and societal impact are broadly the topics of scholarly media studies. "Love Story" (2008) is amongst the songs studied by evolutionary psychologists to understand the relationship between popular music and human mating strategies. In The New York Times article "Taylor Swift is Singing Us Back to Nature", conservation scientist Jeff Opperman opined that Swift's songs are "filled with the language and images of the natural world", revitalizing themes of nature in popular culture after a reported decline in nature-themed words. New Scientist credited Swift with revitalizing interest in botany, with authors in Annals of Botany nominating Swift's music videos as academic tools in addressing plant blindness in the 21st-century.

In explaining why Swift has become a subject of scholarly study, literature professor Elizabeth Scala opined that Swift's creativity is "contagious" and of particular interest to academics as she is a perceived "bridge" between contemporary and historical fiction. Literary scholar Burt stated, "humanities ought to study culture, including the culture of the present day, and Taylor Swift is all over that culture" and claimed that future historians and anthropologists will study Swift's art, fame and reception to understand the contemporaneous society and deduce cross-cultural patterns. Fellow academic Green opined, studying Swift combines critique with feminist biography, and that her discography is "very bit as profound, significant and foundational" as the works of novelists Ann Radcliffe, Mary Shelley and Bram Stoker, posing the public with "deep questions about selfhood and culture". In 2025, Canadian historian Elizabeth Vlossack dubbed Swift a "modern-day historical figure" who engages with the historical figures and events of the past within her music. Some authors consider Swift a philosopher. Linguists and acousticians have studied the evolution of Swift's voice, speech, dialect and accent.

=== Honorifics ===
Swift has been honored by various academic and scientific organizations. In May 2010, British-American mission specialist Piers Sellers brought Swift's self-titled album aboard NASA mission STS-132, the 32nd flight of Space Shuttle Atlantis. Later on in December 2018, as a part of NASA's ElaNa 19 initiative, Swift's 1989 was launched into space on the CubeSat Project DaVinci as a time capsule on Earth's orbit from Mahia, New Zealand. The album was uploaded to the satellite, while its CD—autographed by Swift—was engraved to its side. She was conferred an honorary Doctor of Fine Arts degree from New York University in 2022 for being "one of the most prolific and celebrated artists of her generation".

The Washington State Department of Natural Resources declared Swift a honorary geologist for "championing awareness of Earth's geologic eras". Botanists named a novel plant phenotype-monitoring remote sensor as "TSWIFT" (Tower Spectrometer on Wheels for Investigating Frequent Timeseries). Zoologists have named the following previously-unknown animal species after her as per the International Code of Zoological Nomenclature:

- Nannaria swiftae – a millipede species from Swift's home-state Tennessee, United States, 2022
- Castianeira swiftay – a spider species from Costa Rica, 2023
- Swiftiephylus – a genus of four true bugs from Australia named in honor of Swifties, 2026
  - Swiftiephylus taylorae – named for Swift herself
  - Swiftiephylus amator – in tribute of Lover
  - Swiftiephylus intrepidus – in tribute of Fearless
  - Swiftiephylus poetorum – in tribute of The Tortured Poets Department

=== Academic programs ===
Various higher educational institutions offer undergraduate and elective courses focusing on Swift. Many of the courses employ a dissection of Swift's work as "an entry point into criticism, analysis, and broader cultural issues and touchstones." A number of universities, such as Indiana University Bloomington, University of Birmingham, University of Kent, University of Liverpool, University of Rhode Island, and University of Melbourne have hosted academic conferences, symposia or lectures about Swift's cultural impact. In 2024, her lyrics were the subject of two questions (Note: Annotations of select verses of the song "I Hate It Here", the 23rd track on The Tortured Poets Department: The Anthology) in the University of São Paulo's FUVEST test, the foremost entrance examination to Brazilian universities.

List of courses on Swift offered by select educational institutions
Institution	Course title	Course description	Ref.
American University	Swiftonomics: Economics of Taylor Swift	Economic impact of Swift and the Eras Tour	
Arizona State University	Psychology of Taylor Swift	Phenomena such as gossip, relationships, and revenge through Swift's work and life	
Arizona State University	Taylor Swift (Public Policy Version)	Swift's impact on public policy	
Arizona State University	The Lyrics and Legacy of Taylor Swift	Analysis of Swift's storytelling and marketing	
Austin Peay State University	The Invisible String of Romanticism	Poeticism of Swift's songwriting alongside Romantic poets	
Berklee College of Music	Songs of Taylor Swift	Swift's compositions, lyricism, global appeal, and musical evolution across her 10 albums	
Binghamton University	Taylor Swift, 21C Music	Impact of the 21st-century music industry on Swift's music evolution, gender, race, sexuality, and business	
Brigham Young University	Miss Americana: Taylor Swift, Ethics and Political Society	Ethical analysis of themes in Swift's music	
Brock University	A Swift History	Swift as a historian	
Christopher Newport University	Contextualizing Taylor Swift	Understanding Swifts many identities: musician, poet, feminist, politician, cult leader et cetera	
Ghent University	Literature: Taylor's Version	Critical analysis of Swift's writing techniques, styles and themes against classical English literature	
Harvard University	Taylor Swift and Her World	Literary and aesthetic analysis of Swift's music, lyrics, influence and artistry in the context of American art, culture and literature	
Michigan State University	Society and the Individual: The Taylor Swift Phenomenon	Exploring the economic, political, environmental, historical, and gender-based contexts surrounding Swift's career and cultural impact	
New York University Tisch School of the Arts	Swiftology 101	Swift's creative entrepreneurship, legacy, image, genres, fandom, and analyses of youth, girlhood, race, ownership, American nationalism, and social media	
Northeastern University	Speak Now: Gender & Storytelling in Taylor Swift's Eras	The impact of women's literary and cultural contributions to genre and narrative on the artistry of Swift's ten musical eras	
Northeastern State University	Taylor Swift, the Woman, the Music, the Industry	Impact of Western music history on Swift's output	
Northern Kentucky University	The Poetry of Taylor Swift	Swift's lyrical styles and poetic techniques	
Queen Mary University of London	Taylor Swift and Literature	Swift's lyricism as literature, its canonicity, literary value, and critical theory in political, national, and historical contexts	
Queen's University at Kingston	Taylor Swift's Literary Legacy	Swift's sociopolitical impact on contemporary culture, the recontextualization of her songs as literature, and exploration of her work within feminist and queer theory	
Quinnipiac University	Taylor Swift: Cultural Mirrorball	Chronology and theoretical frameworks behind Swift's repertoire and legacy	
Rice University	Miss Americana: The Evolution and Lyrics of Taylor Swift	Swift's cultural impact, songwriting evolution, femininity, social media, public opinion, whiteness, and feud	
Salem State University	The Media Impact and Societal Influence of Taylor Alison Swift	Swift's influence on American life and politics	
St. Thomas University (Canada)	Communications and Taylor Swift	Swift's marketing, communication strategies, and use of social media	
Stanford University	All Too Well (Ten Week Version)	In-depth analysis of "All Too Well"	
Stanford University	The Last Great American Songwriter: Storytelling With Taylor Swift Through the Eras	Literary analysis of Swift's repertoire, lyrical evolution, and cultural impact	
University of Buenos Aires Social Studies College	Who is Taylor Swift Anyway, ew	Swift's discography and lyricism with regards to popular American culture and English literature	
University of California, Berkeley	Artistry and Entrepreneurship: Taylor's Version	Swift as a songwriter, business woman and creative influence, and her impact on literature, economics, business and sociology	
University of California, Davis	Folklore and Fairytales: the Literary Words of Taylor Swift	Swift's music, literature and cultural effects	
University of Central Florida	Rhetoric in Popular Culture (Taylor's Version)	Rhetorical theories and strategies in pop-culture discourses and media with focus on Swift	
University of Delaware	Taylor Swift and the American Dream	Swift as an American Dream	
University of Florida	Musical storytelling with Taylor Swift and other iconic female artists	Investigation of the storytelling in songs by female artists such as Aretha Franklin, Billie Holiday, and Dolly Parton, with emphasis on Swift	
University of Houston	The Entrepreneurial Genius of Taylor Swift	Swift's entrepreneurship, marketing, fan engagement, community building and branding strategies	
University of Kansas	The Sociology of Taylor Swift	Swift's fans as a community of interest and subculture	
University of Miami School of Communication	Strategically Communicating through Music: The Mastermind of the Taylor Swift Brand	Brand-building, audience engagement, and the importance of communication	
University of Miami School of Law	Intellectual Property Law Through the Lens of Taylor Swift	Swift's re-recorded albums, trademarks, copyrights, contracts, lawsuits, privacy and other legal issues	
University of Missouri	Taylor Swiftory	Swift as a historical literary source	
University of the Philippines Diliman	Celebrity Studies: Taylor Swift in Focus	Swift's celebrity and its impact on the relationships between the public, media, class, politics, gender, race, and success	
University of South Carolina	Life is Just a Classroom: Taylor's Version	Swift's business aspects, such as her economic impact, ticket sales, merchandise, philanthropy, fandom, and corporate sponsorships	
University of South Dakota	The Taylor Swift Effect	Intersection of Swift and the law, such as her re-recorded albums and copyright issues	
University of Texas at Austin College of Liberal Arts	The Taylor Swift Songbook	Formalist literary criticism of Swift's songs alongside poets such as William Shakespeare, John Keats, Robert Frost, Emily Dickinson and Sylvia Plath	
University of Victoria	Major Author: Taylor Swift	Literary analysis of Swift's lyricism	
Xavier University	Taylor Swift in Context	Swift's music in the stylistic and cultural context of her career	

== Recognitions and tributes ==
The following is a list of select honorific nicknames, awards, and museum exhibitions of Swift:

=== Sobriquets ===
Bloomberg Businessweek proclaimed Swift "The Music Industry" on the magazine cover dated November 14, 2014.

- "America's Sweetheart" – a title the media used for her in her early days, owing to her "all-American girl" image.
- "Princess of Country" – stemmed from her mainstream popularity as a country star.
- The "Pop Titan" or "Queen of Pop" – due to her popular music dominance.
- "Queen of Bridges" – conferred by Time and PopSugar in appreciation of Swift's expertise in composing well-received bridges.
- "Queen of Easter Eggs" – coined when Swift became known for the Easter eggs and clues embedded in her album cycles.
- "The Music Industry" – given by Bloomberg Businessweek and the American journalist Barbara Walters in light of her grip on the industry's fiber.

=== Accolades ===
In 2013, Swift received the second-ever Country Music Association Pinnacle Award (after Garth Brooks), presented by Faith Hill, Tim McGraw, George Strait, Keith Urban, Brad Paisley and Rascal Flatts, in recognition of her "unprecedented global commercial success" and role in bringing country music to a global audience. In 2014, she received the first-ever Dick Clark Award of Excellence from Diana Ross for her "groundbreaking achievements" in the music industry. In 2019, Swift went on to become the first recipient of the Billboard Woman of the Decade (the 2010s) title for being "one of the most accomplished musical artists of all time over the course of the 2010s", and received the American Music Awards' Artist of the Decade from Carole King for her record-setting wins in the 2010s.

In 2021, the Brit Awards awarded Swift the Global Icon trophy "in recognition of her immense impact on music across the world". In 2022, the Nashville Songwriters Association International named her Songwriter of the Decade to acknowledge her success as a writer. In 2023, she was presented the Innovator Award by iHeartRadio Music Awards for "her impact on global pop culture" and named Person of the Year by Time, the first time someone from the arts received the designation in its 96-year history. In 2026, Spielberg inducted her into the Songwriters Hall of Fame, and Greta Gerwig will present her with the Sherry Lansing Leadership Award at The Hollywood Reporter Women in Entertainment gala.

=== Museums ===
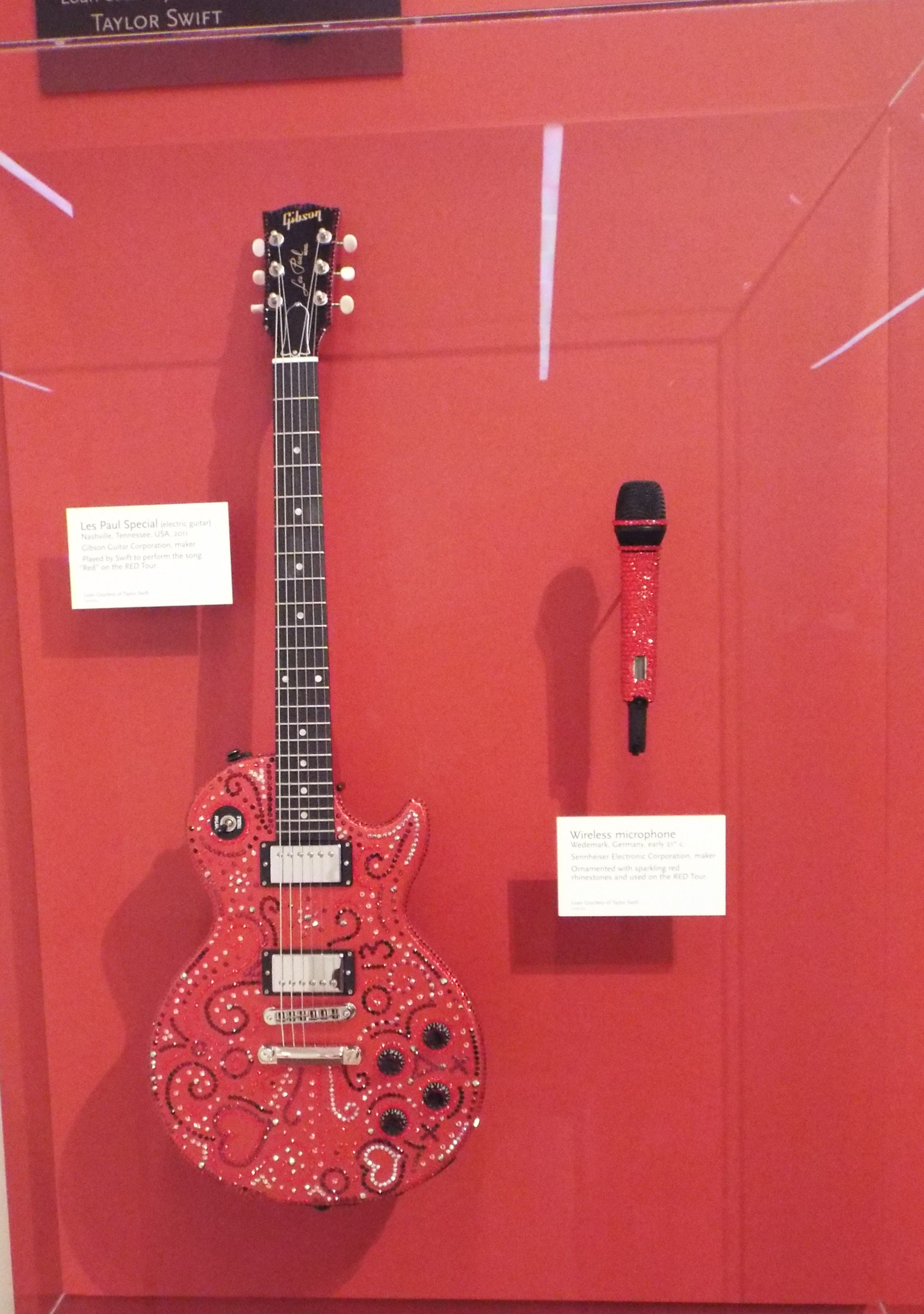
Swift was voted as one of the best guitarists of the 21st-century in a poll reported in Guitar.com; pictured is her Les Paul guitar from the Red Tour (2013–2014) in the Musical Instrument Museum of Phoenix.

- Country Music Hall of Fame and Museum, Nashville
  - The Taylor Swift Education Center (2013): curriculum-connected activities for school groups, music programs, workshops and book talks.
  - Through Taylor Swift's Eras, (2023): original outfits from all of Swift's eras; recorded the highest monthly attendance in the museum's 65-year history.
- Grammy Museum at L.A. Live, Los Angeles
  - The Taylor Swift Experience (2014): celebration of Swift's career trajectory with a specially curated exhibit; broke attendance records and became the museum's "most popular exhibit to date".
  - I Can See You (Taylor’s Version) (At Grammy Museum) (2023): 13 costumes and instruments from Swift's Speak Now era.
- Arlington Museum of Art, Arlington, Texas – The Eras Tour Collection (2023): an exhibit exploring Swift's artistry, featuring costumes, photographs, and concert videos.
- Museum of Arts and Design, New York City – Taylor Swift: Storyteller (2023): career-spanning look at Swift's artistic reinventions.
- Victoria and Albert Museum, London – Taylor Swift: Songbook Trail (2024): costumes and memorabilia from Swift's personal archives.
- Museum of Fine Arts, Boston – Taylor Swift: The Eras Collection (2026): 12 themed dioramas featuring more than 50 costumes, iconic instruments, and archival pieces spanning Swift's entire career.
- Madame Tussauds hosts 13 unique wax figures of Swift across its 13 museums (New York Nashville, Las Vegas, Orlando, Amsterdam, Berlin, Blackpool, Budapest, Hong Kong, London, Sydney, and Shanghai), each depicting an era of Swift.
