= Political impact of Taylor Swift =

Societal influence of American singer-songwriter

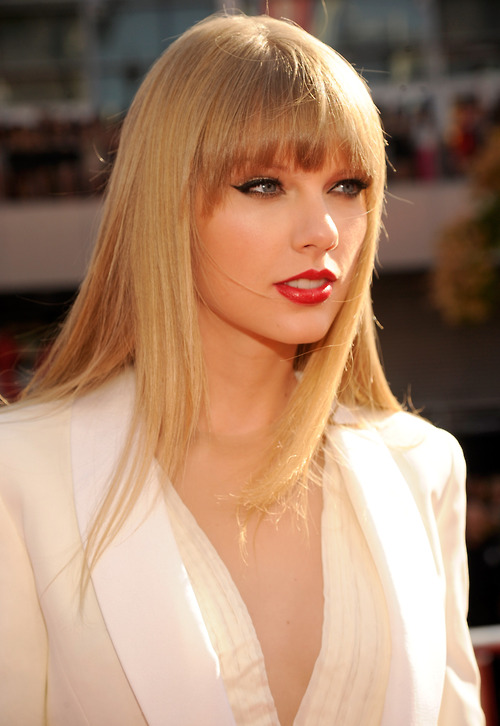
Swift at the 2012 MTV Video Music Awards

The American singer-songwriter Taylor Swift has exerted a significant political influence. Examined in an extensive body of reporting and analysis, the magnitude of Swift's fame distinguishes her leverage in the politics of the United States from that of other American music artists. She has also inspired or been acknowledged by politicians from Australia, Brazil, Canada, Southeast Asia, and the European Union, amongst other places. Music critics have described some of her songs, such as "Miss Americana & the Heartbreak Prince" (2019) and "Only the Young" (2020), as political protest songs.

Swift voted for the first time in the 2008 U.S. presidential election—won by Barack Obama—and expressed satisfaction with its outcome. In 2012, she refused to discuss politics "because it might influence other people." Journalists criticized her apolitical stance. After the 2016 election of Donald Trump as U.S. president, Swift made her first political endorsement, supporting the Democratic candidates Phil Bredesen and Jim Cooper for the 2018 U.S. midterm elections in Tennessee, via a highly publicized Instagram post. In 2019, Swift claimed that she voted for Obama in the 2008 and 2012 elections, and for Hillary Clinton in the 2016 election, but was advised to not discuss politics by record label executives, who warned her about the 2003 Dixie Chicks controversy.

Characterized as a liberal, Swift is pro-choice, an advocate of gender equality, LGBTQIA+ rights and gun control, and a vocal critic of racism, white supremacy, sexism, homophobia, and police brutality. She condemned Trump's presidency, accusing it of racism and fostering violence during the George Floyd protests, criticized the policies of the Republican senator Marsha Blackburn and the overruling of Roe v. Wade, and supported the Equality Act, the creation of Juneteenth as a national holiday and the removal of Confederate statues. She endorsed the Democratic tickets of Joe Biden and Kamala Harris in the 2020 United States presidential election, and Harris and Tim Walz in the 2024 election.

Subject to media scrutiny, Swift has been praised and criticized by all sides of the political spectrum. In the early 2010s, some neo-Nazis theorized Swift as their "Aryan" media figure, motivated by her political silence; however, after her open support for Democrats, conservative media outlets alleged she is a "Pentagon psy-op" of a Democrat-led U.S. government. Trumpists and the right wing have derided her "woke" liberal and feminist views. On the other hand, some liberal commentators consider Swift's political activism as performative and inadequate, with some even accusing her of being duplicitous and MAGA undercover. According to The Times, even though Swift is left-aligned, a portion of the right wing still "covet" her, making her a unifying entity that could help bridge the political divide of the U.S. by drawing various demographics to her cause. She has caused unprecedented increases in voter registrations and inspired a variety of legislations, dubbed "the Taylor Swift effect". Various surveys have reported her approval ratings to be higher than those of Biden and Trump, attributing her political sway in the U.S. to her status as an anomalous American cultural icon. Trump has frequently and inconsistently criticized Swift over the years.

Some journalists consider Swift a soft power. Her fanbase, the Swifties, have been compared to a voting bloc in electoral politics. Various heads of government of the world, such as Justin Trudeau, Liz Truss, Rishi Sunak, Keir Starmer, Leni Robredo, Gabriel Boric, Emmanuel Macron, and Ulf Kristersson, consider Swift a positive influence on citizens; Chinese state media has consistently praised Swift. On the other hand, fans have been the target of extremist attacks such as the 2024 Southport stabbings and the ISIS-assisted Vienna terrorism plot.

== Background ==
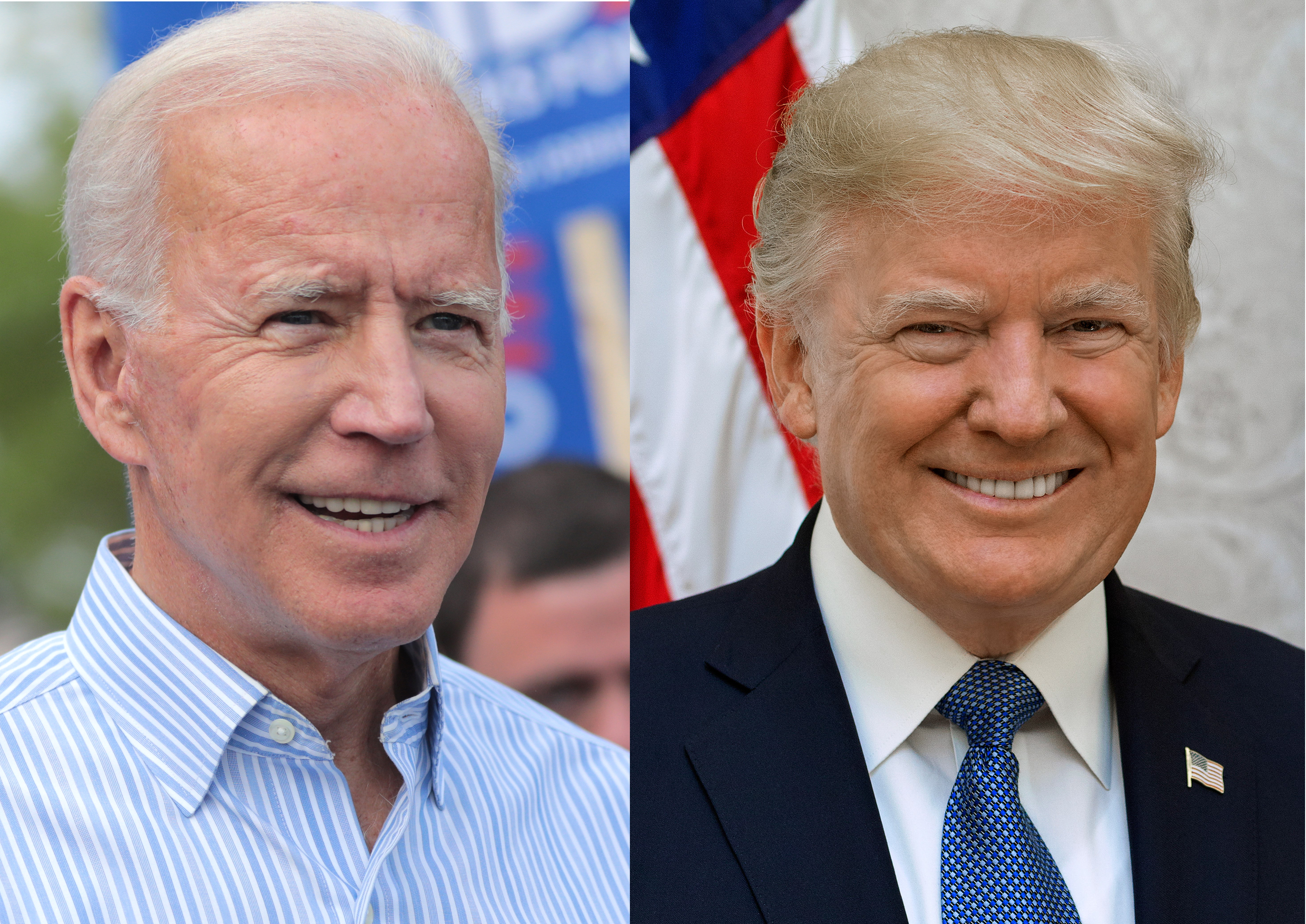
According to The Times, 53% of adult Americans are fans of Swift, far higher than approval ratings of Joe Biden (left) and Donald Trump (right) in 2023.

As an American cultural icon, Swift is a powerful personality in the politics of the United States. She is the most influential musician in the political sphere, as per Forbes. Swift has been cited in various legal proceedings as a precedent or a source of example. She is socially liberal, having criticized white supremacy, racism, and police brutality in the U.S. She is pro-choice and an advocate of gender equality and LGBTQIA+ rights. Swift has also been censured by some liberal and conservative critics; the former considering her activism performative, while the latter detest her for being an outspoken "woke" liberal. Political candidates she has endorsed include Democrats Phil Bredesen, Jim Cooper, Joe Biden, Kamala Harris, and Tim Walz. She has criticized Republican politicians Donald Trump and Marsha Blackburn.

Taylor Swift
(@taylorswift13)
tweeted:

After stoking the fires of white supremacy and racism your entire presidency, you have the nerve to feign moral superiority before threatening violence? 'When the looting starts the shooting starts'??? We will vote you out in November. @realdonaldtrump

May 29, 2020

=== Perceived apolitical stance ===
Journalists had described Swift as an apolitical country musician, who avoided discussing political topics in her early career—noted in retrospect as her time under the record label Big Machine Records. During a 2009 interview with Rolling Stone, Swift said she supported the U.S. president of the time, Barack Obama after she voted for the first time in the 2008 U.S. presidential election: "I've never seen this country so happy about a political decision in my entire time of being alive". When asked by Time in 2012 regarding the 2012 election, Swift said, "I try to keep myself as educated and informed as possible. But I don't talk about politics because it might influence other people. And I don't think that I know enough yet in life to be telling people who to vote for." In 2019, Swift disclosed that she voted for Obama in both the 2008 and the 2012 elections, and that she was advised by label executives to not discuss political topics.

Through the 2010s, journalists criticized Swift's perceived lack of political activism despite her status as a celebrated figure, claiming her philanthropy is inadequate. Motivated by Swift's apoliticism, Trump called her a "terrific" role model; conservative lawmakers invited her to visit the U.S. Capitol. Retrospectively, critics such as The Independent's Emma Clarke have reasoned with Swift's former apoliticism, attributing it to having started "her music career in Nashville, Tennessee, a predominantly red state; the last time the Democrats won there was in 1996."

Swift remained apolitical for the 2016 U.S. presidential election, neither supporting Democrat Hillary Clinton nor speaking against Trump, as some had expected. Critics questioned who Swift had voted for in the election as she posted a picture of her in a polling station queue. After she shared a photo of herself wearing an outfit similar to what Clinton once wore, a USA Today headline said, "Who did Taylor Swift vote for? Here's why her sweater suggests Hillary". Entertainment Weekly analyzed Instagram's "most popular Election Day content", reporting that some of the most-liked posts were those from Rihanna, Demi Lovato, Kourtney Kardashian, and Ariana Grande, all of whom had explicitly endorsed Clinton but that Swift's "innocuous" non-partisan post earned the most likes (2.1 million). This showed Swift was a pop culture anomaly according to The Ringer critic Alyssa Bereznak. BBC journalist Nick Levine found her political silence "increasingly conspicuous".

=== Sociopolitical scrutiny ===
According to Bereznak, apoliticism might have been "an advantageous business strategy" for pop stars before; however, for cultural figures like Swift, their "actions, communication, and work" are analyzed by the media in a political lens. In 2017, Swift supported the 2017 Women's March via Instagram, which was met with criticism from both fans and critics, who felt it was pointless as Swift refused to channel her feminist activism into politics. The Cut suggested that, even though Clinton had the open support of Katy Perry, Beyoncé, Jay-Z, and Bruce Springsteen, Swift's public endorsement "could have" helped her become president. Medford opined Swift cannot subsist in a political vacuum as it becomes "deafeningly noticeable". Criticizing her use of social media only for music announcements and not politics, Medford wrote: "To have such a large, wide-reaching platform and use it only for the advancement of your own ambition reflects poorly, regardless of how progressive your politics may be." Publications such as Rolling Stone and Dissent have termed the "weird" extreme responses to Swift on Internet as the "Taylor Swift Derangement Syndrome", with the liberal social media users dubbing her a right-wing idol while the right-wing dubs her a liberal idol.

==== Conservatism allegations ====
Some critics attributed Swift's political silence to a significant portion of her fandom in 2014 being conservative country fans. The most intense sociopolitical criticisms alleged that Swift is a crypto-fascist. Exploiting her persisting political silence in 2016 and 2017, some white supremacists in the U.S. considered Swift one of them—a neo-Nazi. Some alt-right websites such as The Daily Stormer and Breitbart News praised her, with The Daily Stormer proclaiming her as their "Aryan Goddess", waiting for Trump's win to announce her "Aryan Agenda" to the world. Liberal media outlets demanded Swift to clarify her political stance. When a blog post by PopFront, a left-wing website, alleged that her 2017 single "Look What You Made Me Do" was a "subtle" alt-right nod, Swift's team called the post defamatory and demanded that PopFront "issue a retraction, remove the story from all media sources, and cease and desist", or face legal consequences. The American Civil Liberties Union (ACLU) criticized Swift for attempting to "suppress constitutionally protected speech".

NPR journalist Leah Donella asserted that there is no reason to think Swift is a white supremacist, stating "she has no affiliation with any white supremacist groups. She has never publicly made any white supremacist remarks, nor has she ever been accused of making them in private". Donella noted claims that Swift is a white supremacist rest solely on the fact that she is white, "looks white, and hangs out with mostly white people", justifying the latter with 2014 studies demonstrating that a white person has only one person of color as a friend for every 91 white friends: "This isn't a Taylor Swift thing. It's a housing segregation/workplace diversity/general American history thing."

Swift began dating the American football player Travis Kelce in 2023. Pop culture commentators and journalists described Swift and Kelce as a supercouple, often as America's very own "royal couple". Emily Yahr opined in The Washington Post that the U.S. "giddily contemplates" the pairing of Swift and Kelce that, "for many observers, checks all the right boxes". Andrew Unterbeger of Billboard opined that the pair resulted in a "near-100% public approval" because "it just felt right: the All-American athlete dating the All-American pop star."

Swift and Kelce became engaged in August 2025, and Swift received considerable backlash from some fans and social media users, who alleged that Swift is promoting a tradwife lifestyle due to her lyrics about "settling down" and having children in her twelfth studio album, The Life of a Showgirl (2025). They also claimed that Swift and Kelce are aligning themselves with Make America Great Again (MAGA). Swift has also faced controversy online over her friendship with Brittany Mahomes, who has publicly supported Trump before. Many journalists described the accusation as irrational, stating such online discourses are rooted in bad-faith misinterpretations of Swift, but reported that MAGA influencers and right-wing activists are leveraging the engagement to spread their agenda. Citing research from a behavioral intelligence company, Rolling Stone reported in December 2025 that the discourse was driven by a coordinated network of bot-like social media accounts. When asked about his thoughts on the engagement, Trump answered "Well, I wish them a lot of luck. I think [Kelce is] a great player, a great guy. I think [Swift is] a terrific person. So, I wish them a lot of luck." Journalists have noted Trump's inconsistent attitude towards Swift and Kelce, having criticized them earlier, individually.

==== Lack of public comment ====
Swift has been criticized by fans and journalists over a number of other issues. Her private jet usage and lack of climate activism is often mentioned in the mainstream media. It has also been highlighted that she has not publicly commented on the Israeli–Palestinian conflict. Following the outbreak of the Gaza war in 2023, Swift received some backlash over her concert film, Taylor Swift: The Eras Tour, reportedly playing in Jerusalem. In November 2023, Israel's official state Twitter account asked Swift to call for the return of a hostage who was a fan of hers. In December 2023, Swift attended a pro-Palestinian stand-up show for Gaza, organized by Egyptian-American comedian Ramy Youssef. After the Tel al-Sultan attack in 2024, members of Swift's fanbase urged her to comment on the conflict. The first episode of the 2025 documentary The End of an Era, which documents the tour behind the scenes, sparked controversy due to a minor reference to Israel, with some posting critical comments against Swift on social media using the hashtag #TaylorSwiftisaZionist.

== Endorsements ==
=== 2018 US midterm elections ===
Swift voiced her political view for the first time in the 2018 US midterm elections in Tennessee, "breaking her political silence" according to the media. She endorsed Democrats Phil Bredesen and Jim Cooper via social media posts on October 18, 2018; it was a subject of widespread media coverage and sparked much praise from fans, journalists, celebrities, and Democrats. For instance, This Is Spinal Tap director Rob Reiner tweeted, "A big shout out to Taylor Swift for speaking out. You can single-handedly change this country. Impress your fans with how critical and powerful their voices are. If you get them to the polls on Nov 6, everything you care about will be protected". Swift also censured Republican candidate Blackburn for her "appalling" policies:

"In the past I've been reluctant to publicly voice my political opinions. I feel very differently about that now. I always have and always will cast my vote based on which candidate will protect and fight for the human rights I believe we all deserve in [the United States]. I believe in the fight for LGBTQ rights, and that any form of discrimination based on sexual orientation or gender is WRONG. I believe that the systemic racism we still see in this country towards people of color is terrifying, sickening, and prevalent".

Swift received "fierce backlash" from Republicans, Trumpists, and right-wing supporters who felt "betrayed" by Swift and criticized, slut-shamed, and berated her online; they claimed she "ended" her career with decision and should have "shut up" and "stick to music". The National Republican Senatorial Committee opined, "If you haven't heard, multimillionaire pop star Taylor Swift came down from her ivory tower to tell hardworking Tennesseans to vote for Phil Bredesen". Charlie Kirk, president of conservative group Turning Point USA, tweeted: "You just endorsed a Democrat in the Tennessee Senate race with a ridiculous statement saying Marsha Blackburn, a woman, is against women. You have absolutely no idea what you are talking about". Trump told reporters: "I'm sure Taylor Swift doesn't know anything about her. Let's say that I like Taylor's music about 25% less now, OK?". Journalist Arwa Mahdawi of The Guardian opined, "The right swiftly turned on their former goddess and she became the object of numerous conspiracy theories".

In 2019, Swift stated that when she began her country music career, Big Machine and other label executives advised her to not discuss politics, using the Dixie Chicks controversy as a warning. She described the Trump presidency as an autocracy and regretted not endorsing Clinton in 2016 but said her negative press at the time made her feel "useless" and "like a hindrance". Swift added that Clinton was being called a "manipulative" liar by Trumpists on the internet—the same type of harsh comments Swift had received in 2016, following her dispute with Kanye West and Kim Kardashian—and wondered whether she would be a liability to Clinton: "Look, snakes of a feather flock together. Look, the two lying women. The two nasty women". As "millions of people were telling me to disappear", Swift decided to step away from the spotlight. Emily Strayer, member of the Chicks, opined in 2020 that Swift had much more power to change things than they ever did.

=== 2020 and 2024 US presidential elections ===
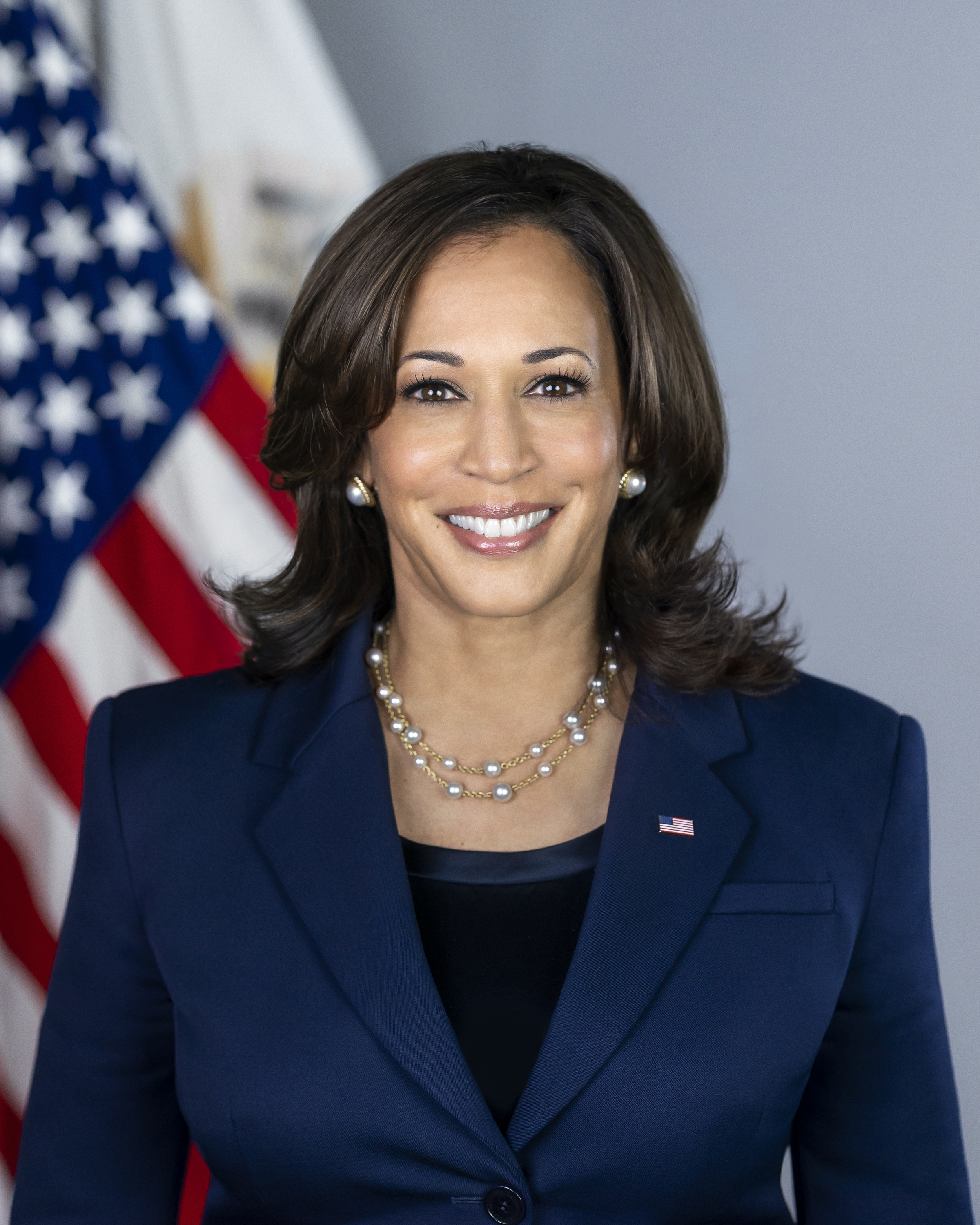
Kamala Harris thanked Swift for endorsing the Democratic campaign in the 2020 U.S. presidential election; Swift went on to endorse her for president at the 2024 election.

In the 2020 U.S. presidential election, Swift endorsed Biden and Harris and lent her protest song "Only the Young" (2020) to their campaign. Harris expressed gratitude to Swift, and tweeted that the singer is showing the young voters "what's at stake" in the election. Forbes staff Seth Cohen found Swift's increased political engagement in the past year "notable for its high-profile approach and big hit commentary." Trump eventually lost his re-election; Biden was elected as the next U.S. president. Swift was found to be the second most influential celebrity in Biden's win, after LeBron James.

In 2024, The New York Times reported that Biden's reelection campaign viewed Swift as their "biggest and most influential endorsement target" in the 2024 U.S. presidential election, aiming to adopt a "Taylor Swift strategy" to boost his "faltering" popular support. Trump supporters alleged that Swift is involved in a conspiracy with the Democrats, the National Football League (NFL) and American football player Travis Kelce, Swift's boyfriend since 2023, to manipulate the voters in favor of Biden. They also claimed that the Super Bowl LVIII, where Kelce's Kansas City Chiefs competed, was rigged for the same reason. They alleged Swift is a "Pentagon psy-op" asset of the Biden-led U.S. government in order to control public opinion. Whereas, Black Lives Matter activist and chair professor of Pan-African Studies at California State University, Melina Abdullah, described the Swift-Kelce relationship as a "right-wing, white-supremacist conspiracy". Republican politician Vivek Ramaswamy, who was a contender in the 2024 presidential race, tweeted, "I wonder who's going to win the Super Bowl next month. And I wonder if there's a major presidential endorsement coming from an artificially culturally propped-up couple this fall." Meanwhile, fellow Republican presidential contestant Nikki Haley criticized the theory, calling it "bizarre"; she said, "Nobody knows who she's gonna endorse, but I can't believe that's overtaken our national politics.... The last thing I really think we need to be worried about is who Taylor Swift is dating and what conspiracy theory is gonna have her endorsing a person for president." The Guardian reported that 18 percent of Americans (nearly one in every five) believe "Swift is part of a covert government effort to re-elect Joe Biden."

According to Vox, 2024 was "a year of paranoid speculation" as Swift's fans and critics alike attempted to determine whether Swift would once again endorse a candidate. On February 11, 2024, Trump claimed on Truth Social that "there's no way" Swift could be "disloyal" to him by endorsing Biden, arguing he "made her so much money" by signing the Music Modernization Act into law. Dina LaPolt, an entertainment attorney instrumental behind the Music Modernization Act, told Variety "Trump did nothing on [the] legislation except sign it, and doesn't even know what the Music Modernization Act does." After the Chiefs won Super Bowl LVIII, Biden posted a meme on social media poking fun at the conspiracy theory using his "Dark Brandon" persona. In August 2024, Trump shared artificial intelligence (AI)-generated images that depicted a likeness of Swift endorsing Trump to Truth Social. The images depicted Swift as Uncle Sam, asking fans to vote Republican.

On September 10, 2024, shortly after the first presidential debate between Trump and Harris, Swift posted a picture of herself with her cat and announced her endorsement of Harris and Tim Walz in the caption. Swift also criticized Trump's use of AI to create the false endorsement in the post, which she signed off as "Childless Cat Lady", referencing comments made by Republican vice-presidential candidate JD Vance about Democrats.

Trump has since consistently criticized Swift. He derided Swift's support of Harris, saying Swift will "pay a price for it in the marketplace". Trump posted to Truth Social with the statement, "I HATE TAYLOR SWIFT!" in response to her endorsement. Political journalist Lawrence O'Donnell described Swift's post as the most influential and "perfectly timed" celebrity endorsement of the 2024 election. Female celebrities such as Stevie Nicks, Linda Ronstadt, and Aubrey Plaza also made Instagram posts posing with their pets, encouraging followers to vote. The Democratic National Committee released advertisements inspired by Swift's music for Harris' campaign, whereas Trump sold Make America Great Again (MAGA) merchandise that copied the "exact" designs of Swift's Eras Tour merchandise. Harris eventually lost the election; Trump was elected as the next U.S. president. He continued to criticize Swift in his second presidency. The labor union American Federation of Musicians condemned Trump for his incessant "attacks" on its members such as Swift and Bruce Springsteen: "Whether it's Born in the U.S.A. or the Eras Tour, their music is timeless, impactful, and has deep cultural meaning. Musicians have the right to freedom of expression, and we stand in solidarity with all our members."

== Songwriting ==
Swift has used her songwriting, videos, and other works to convey her political beliefs. Even when she was apolitical, The New York Times wrote that Swift had a positive impact on the LGBT community as a country artist by releasing the 2011 music video for "Mean". Time described "Welcome to New York" (2014), which featured the lyrics "You can want who you want / Boys and boys and girls and girls" as an "equality anthem". Her 2019 single "You Need to Calm Down" led to a spike in donations to GLAAD, an LGBT non-governmental organization, as the lyrics namecheck the organization. The song has been dubbed a gay anthem.

Critics have also highlighted the political messages of "Miss Americana & the Heartbreak Prince", another 2019 song by Swift. Alexis Petridis from The Guardian lauded the track as being superior to other pop stars' "woke" attempts. In an op-ed for Teen Vogue, Claire Dodson wrote that "Miss Americana & the Heartbreak Prince" successfully captures the disappointment at American politics. Writing for Variety, Chris William felt that "Miss Americana & the Heartbreak Prince" effectively conveys Swift's deep sorrow and disappointment towards American politics." "Only the Young", which was used in advertising campaigns for Biden and Harris, has been described as a "political anthem" with lyrics aimed at the American youth, with lyrics on school shootings. Stereogum's James Rettig opined that the song finds Swift "reckoning with the current political climate and her place in it". Taste of Country's Jacklyn Krol and Cosmopolitan's Starr Bowenbank called it Swift's most politically charged song yet. Paper's Jael Goldfine opined the song depicts a "newly radicalized political identity" for Swift. U.S. House representative Eric Swalwell revealed that Swift authorized the usage of the song for the campaign free-of-cost, marking the first time she has allowed her music to be used in a political advertisement.

== Lawmakers ==
=== Miss Americana ===
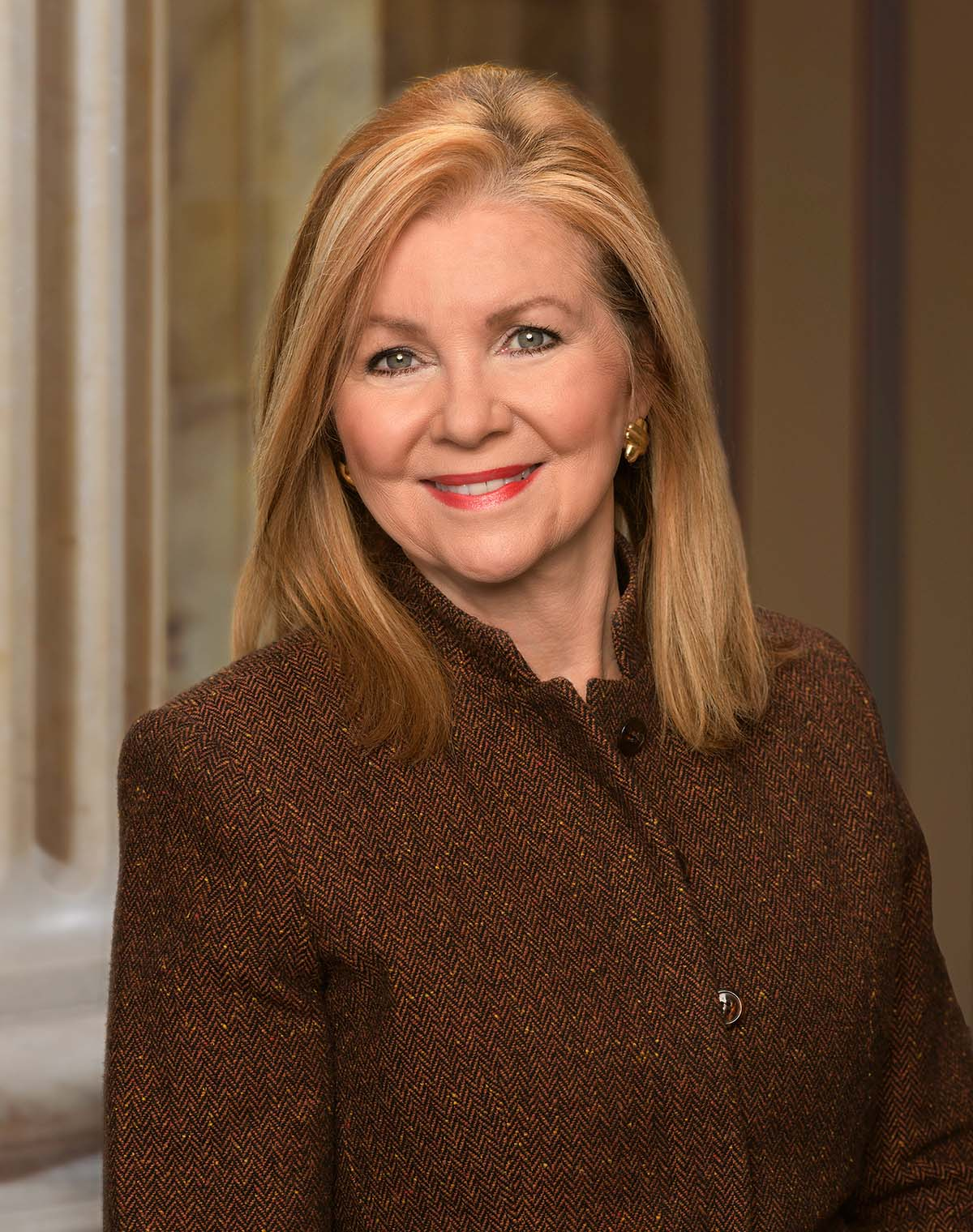
Marsha Blackburn in 2019

In Miss Americana, her 2020 autobiographical documentary titled after the song, Swift narrated her political disillusionment and the events that led to make her 2018 Instagram post about her endorsement, and criticized Blackburn for her policies, saying "[Blackburn's] voting record in Congress appalls and terrifies me. She voted against equal pay for women. She voted against the reauthorization of the Violence Against Women Act, which attempts to protect women from domestic violence, stalking, and date rape. She believes businesses have a right to refuse service to gay couples. She also believes they should not have the right to marry. These are not MY Tennessee values." Swift further explained:

It's really basic human rights, and it's right and wrong at this point, and I can't see another commercial and see [Marsha Blackburn] disguising these policies behind the words "Tennessee Christian values". Those aren't Tennessee Christian values. I live in Tennessee. I'm a Christian. That's not what we stand for. ... She gets to be the first female senator in Tennessee, and she's Trump in a wig. She represents no female interests. She won by being a female applying to the kind of female males want us to be in a horrendous 1950s world.

— Swift criticizing Marsha Blackburn's policies on LGBT and women's rights in Miss Americana.

Blackburn, after winning the senatorial election, responded in July 2021 in the American far-right website Breitbart News, claiming liberals want a Marxist socialist society which prohibits women to perform, or create the type of music Swift does, denying private intellectual property rights, and that Swift "is going to be the first ones who will be cut off because the state would have to approve your music." Some political commentators suggested that Swift should run against Blackburn in the next elections.

=== Creative business and private equity ===
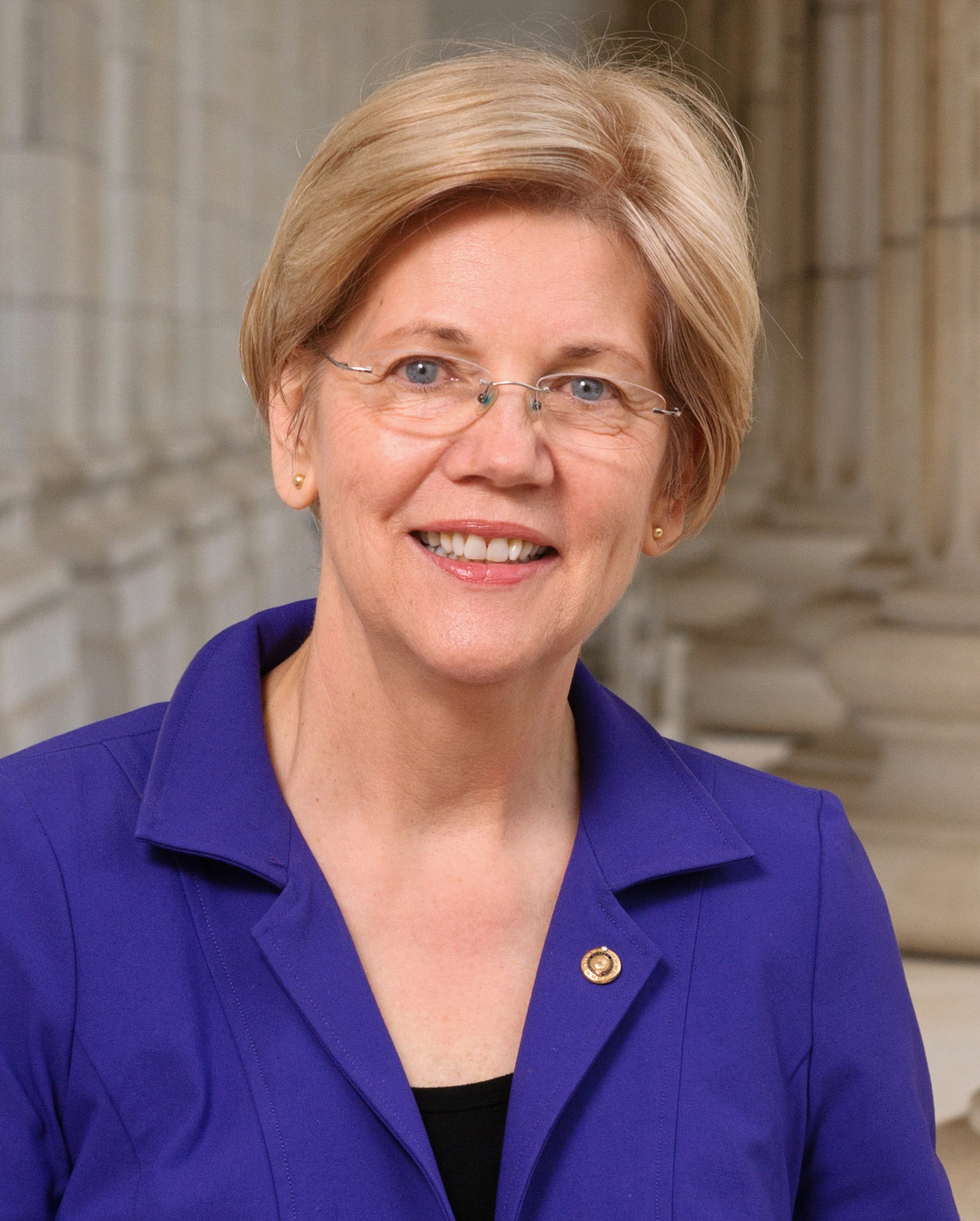
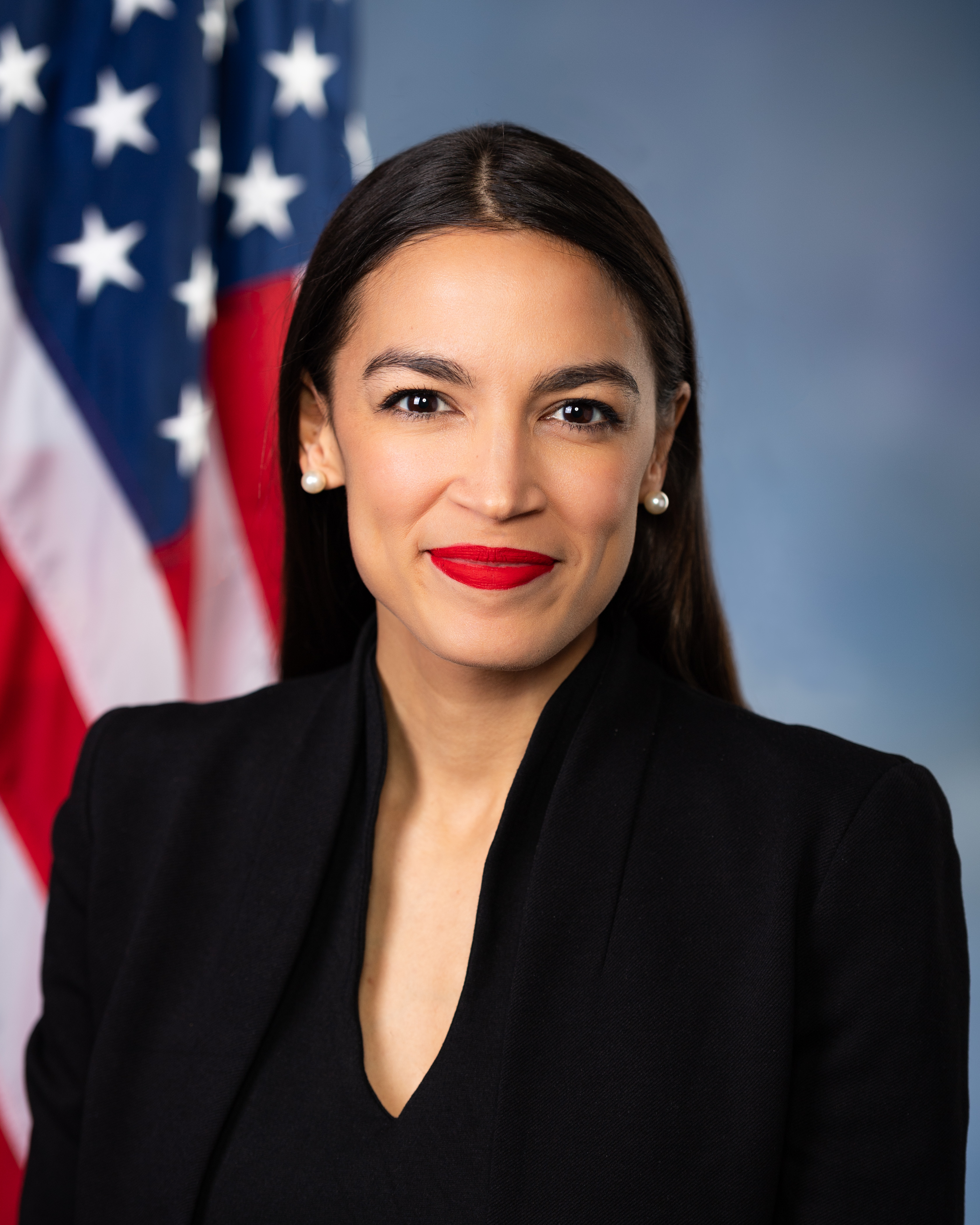
Using Swift, US Democratic politicians Elizabeth Warren (pictured left) and Alexandria Ocasio-Cortez (right) criticized the "predatory" purchases of creative businesses by private equity groups for harming the US economy.

In June 2019, Swift became involved in a dispute with her former record label, Big Machine Records, its founder Scott Borchetta, and its new owner Scooter Braun, over the ownership of the masters of her first six studio albums. U.S. senator Elizabeth Warren, one of the Democratic candidates in the 2020 presidential election, opined that Swift is "one of many" whose creative works have been threatened by private equity firms, who keep "gobbling up more and more of our economy, costing jobs and crushing entire industries"; Warren's presidential campaign often targeted private equity firms. U.S. representative Alexandria Ocasio-Cortez said "private equity groups' predatory practices actively hurt millions of Americans. Their leveraged buyouts have destroyed the lives of retail workers across the country, scrapping 1+ million jobs. Now they're holding [Swift's] own music hostage. They need to be reined in."

American businessman Glenn Youngkin, who was the former co-CEO of the Carlyle Group—one of the parties Swift criticized in the dispute, contested in the 2021 Virginia gubernatorial election as the Republican candidate. Ahead of the election, former governor and Democratic candidate Terry McAuliffe launched a series of advertisements on Facebook, Instagram, and Google Search, indicating Youngkin's ties with the dispute with slogans such as "#WeStandWithTaylor", a hashtag used by Swifties during the dispute; McAuliffe asked Swift's supporters to not vote for Youngkin. On January 14, 2022, Jared Polis, the 43rd Governor of Colorado and the first openly gay man to be elected governor of a U.S. state, supported Swift in his annual gubernatorial address to the state and sang the chorus of "22 (Taylor's Version)" in reference to the new year of 2022.

=== Consumer welfare and industrial monopoly ===
"Ticketmaster's power in the primary ticket market insulates it from the competitive pressures that typically push companies to innovate and improve their services. That can result in the types of dramatic service failures we saw this week, where consumers are the ones that pay the price."

— U.S. Senator Amy Klobuchar

In November 2022, the American ticket sales platform Ticketmaster and its parent company Live Nation Entertainment were met with criticism over their mismanagement of the ticket sales of the U.S. leg of the Eras Tour, Swift's 2023–2024 concert tour. After widespread social media posts by customers upset with the issue, several U.S. lawmakers and consumer groups took notice of the issue. Fortune and Bloomberg News attributed the criticism to Ticketmaster's "oft-confusing multistep buying process plagued with additional fees", as well as "long waits, technical problems, and poor customer service". Ocasio-Cortez and fellow House representative Bill Pascrell opined that Ticketmaster is a monopoly and that its merger with Live Nation must be dissolved. Senator Richard Blumenthal urged for a federal probe into the competition in the live venue music industry. He claimed that the issue "is a perfect example of how the Live Nation/Ticketmaster merger harms consumers by creating a near-monopoly." Fellow senator Amy Klobuchar, chair of the Senate Judiciary Subcommittee on Competition Policy, Antitrust and Consumer Rights, penned an open letter to the CEO of Ticketmaster, Michael Rapino, regarding her concerns over the company's operations.

The attorneys general of Pennsylvania, Tennessee, Nevada, and North Carolina amongst other states, initiated investigations into the issue. Pascrell, co-signed by 30 other House Democrats, (Note: Chuy Garcia, Bonnie Watson Coleman, Barbara Lee, Emanuel Cleaver, Ocasio-Cortez, Brendan Boyle, Rashida Tlaib, John Garamendi, Shontel Brown, Marcy Kaptur, Jimmy Panetta, Kathy Castor, Donald Beyer, Donald Payne, Jr., Ilhan Omar, Sanford Bishop, Ann Kirkpatrick, Jamaal Bowman, Earl Blumenauer, Katie Porter, Gerry Connolly, Rosa DeLauro, David Trone, Steven Cohen, Mondaire Jones, Josh Gottheimer, Seth Moulton, Mike Doyle, Al Green, Andy Kim, and Jamie Raskin.) petitioned the U.S. Department of Justice to open a formal investigation into the issue. Representative David Cicilline, chair of the House Judiciary Subcommittee on Antitrust, Commercial and Administrative Law, urged the Department of Justice to investigate and reverse the merger of the companies. He tweeted that "Live Nation–Ticketmaster is an unchecked monopoly."

The White House Press Secretary, Karine Jean-Pierre, declined to comment on a potential investigation onto Ticketmaster–Live Nation, but stated that the U.S. President, Joe Biden, believes "capitalism without competition isn't capitalism, it's exploitation." Biden soon tweeted that "Millions of Americans will travel home for the holidays and will get hit with hidden 'junk' fees from airlines, hotels—maybe even tickets for a holiday show the family wants to see. It isn't right. My Administration is taking actions to reduce or eliminate these surprise fees." Blumenthal and Blackburn wrote a letter to the Federal Trade Commission (FTC), enquiring about the agency's "plans to fight the use of bots in ticketing", and urging to enforce the Better Online Tickets Sales Act, a 2016 federal law that grants the U.S. government the authority to take down software applications that are programmed to run automated tasks online.

In December 2022, FTC chair Lina Khan stated that the controversial ticket-sale crash "ended up converting more Gen Zers into anti-monopolists overnight than anything I could have done." In June 2023, following a meeting with Biden and the FTC, ticketing companies such as Ticketmaster and SeatGeek formed a consensus to abolish "junk fees". Biden and the National Economic Council director Lael Brainaird released a statement claiming that the prohibition of the deceptive surprise fees applies to resorts and rentals as well. American legal scholar William Kovacic called the move the "Taylor Swift policy adjustment."

In January 2024, the Senate judiciary committee held a hearing titled "That's the Ticket: Promoting Competition and Protecting Consumers in Live Entertainment", to analyze the issue. Media outlets reported that both the bipartisan senators censured Ticketmaster's monopolistic practices, policies, ticket costs, lack of transparency, lack of defense against bots, and insensitivity to music artists. Billboard stated that politicians of both the major political parties of the U.S., who see criticizing Ticketmaster as a "winning political issue and an opportunity to reach constituents who have long complained about the ticketing giant", are more of a threat to Ticketmaster than Swift herself. The Washington Post columnist Helaine Olen opined the Ticketmaster fiasco "was so bad it united the parties". CNN journalist Allison Morrow wrote that Swift's fans have united the two parties in a way "the Founding Fathers failed to anticipate". Media publications deemed the controversy a testament to Swift's political impact and beneficial to the music industry by driving conversations about economic inequality and antitrust laws in the US.

Forbes reported scalping of the Eras Tour tickets in the United Kingdom as well, with immediate re-listing on sites like StubHub and Viagogo for extortionate prices. Kevin Brennan, a U.K. Member of Parliament from Cardiff, Wales, demanded a debate in the House of Commons on the U.K. government's strategy to handle the ticket scalpers. In the Republic of Ireland's Thomas Pringle, member of the Oireachtas, criticized the "rampant price gouging" in Dublin for the tour's stop in the city as "disgraceful display of greed" by local hotels. Brazilian politician Simone Marquetto, a member of the Brazilian Chamber of Deputies for São Paulo, proposed increasing the maximum prison sentence for scalping from one year to four years and fines up to 100 times the price set by scalpers.

== Electoral influence ==
=== Domestic ===
Over 169,000 people registered to vote in the 2018 U.S. mid-term elections within two days of Swift's post, as per Vote.org, whereas only 59,000 people registered to vote in the 30 preceding days. Publications credited the Taylor Swift effect. As per a statistical research by academics Gwendelyn Nisbett and Stephanie Dunn, Swift's narrative and message in the post influenced her followers, beyond the fans' parasocial attachment to her. Behavioral scientist Simone Driessen wrote that some media consider Swift's political "coming-out" as a strategy to further her career, whereas others consider it mandatory for pop stars in a political climate "to express where they stand".

The function and potential of Swift's fanbase, the Swifties, as a voting bloc has been analyzed by publications. After Swift posted on Instagram in September 2023 about Vote.org's National Voter Registration Day, more than 35,000 people registered to vote, a 23 percent increase in total registrations and 115 percent increase among 18-year-olds when compared to the 2022 National Voter Registration Day. Andrea Hailey, chief executive of Vote.org, said the organization's partnership with Swift is helping all Americans "make their voices heard at the ballot box." For the partnership, Swift and Vote.org were awarded a Webby Award for Best Creator or Influencer Collaboration, Features (Social) in 2024. Swifties For Kamala is a political advocacy group formed by a host of Swifties in support of Harris' 2024 campaign. It collaborated with Voters of Tomorrow, a political advocacy group by Gen-Z that seeks to boost the youth vote, to target college students in swing states.

Facebook data from 2014 revealed that Swift is one of the artists who formed the "happy median" of musical listening habits of its Democratic and Republican users. According to a 2023 survey reported by The Times, 53 percent adult Americans consider themselves fans of Swift, ratings higher than those of Biden and Trump; journalist Ellie Austin explained that though Swift is left-aligned, some rightists still "covet" her, making her a "uniting" demographic fulcrum that can bridge America's political divide. In another survey reported by The New York Sun, Swift was the third most popular choice for the U.S. president, after Trump and Biden. She also had the highest favorability rating of all the public figures tested in the NBC News's 2023 nationwide poll, with 40 percent of registered voters saying they have "a positive view of Swift" and a 16 percent holding a negative view.

Swift's political sway was further evident in the bipartisan criticism of Ticketmaster; CNN journalist Allison Morrow wrote in an article titled "One Nation, Under Swift" that Swift's fans united the parties in a way "the Founding Fathers failed to anticipate". Brooke Schultz of the Associated Press noticed how the issue turned into a political movement and considered Swift's fans an influential voter demographic. As per Morning Consult, approximately 55% of Swift's U.S. fans are Democratic, 23% Republican, and 23% independent. Politico remarked, "Swift's fans are arguably the most immersive and intense fandom in the U.S., and they are a political force that anyone really shouldn't mess with."

In the 2024 U.S. presidential elections, when Harris announced her presidential candidature, Swifties launched "Swifties For Kamala", a social media movement that quickly amassed tens of thousands of followers. Following Swift's Instagram post endorsing Harris and urging her 284 million followers to register to vote, Vote.org recorded 405,999 people visit its site via Swift's Instagram story. Former White House Director of Strategic Communications Alyssa Farah Griffin considered Swift the "only person" who could defeat Trump in an election. Kevin Monnin of The Hill opined that, powered by her cultural significance and large following, Swift "could play a pivotal role for democracy by securing the re-election of President Biden and ending the political career of former President Donald Trump." Nathan J. Robinson, writing for Newsweek, said "only Swift can unite the political divide" in the U.S. A poll conducted for Newsweek reported 18 percent of all voters are "more likely" or "significantly more likely" to vote for a candidate endorsed by Swift. Academic Michael A. Cohen claimed "Swift could affect the outcome of the 2024 election." According to Clarke, the combination of Swift's unique bipartisan appeal and her endorsement of Harris will "may yet prove to be pivotal" in the 2024 election as it is "to be decided in a handful of key states, by a few thousand votes". Meredith Conroy of ABC News termed it "The Swift Surge", comparing it to "The Oprah Effect" and "The Colbert Bump". Richard T Longoria of The Guardian opined that Swift's impact on the election is minimal, but could pave way for a Harris win by swaying the decisive "undecided" votes for Democrats in swing states.

=== Foreign ===
==== Americas ====
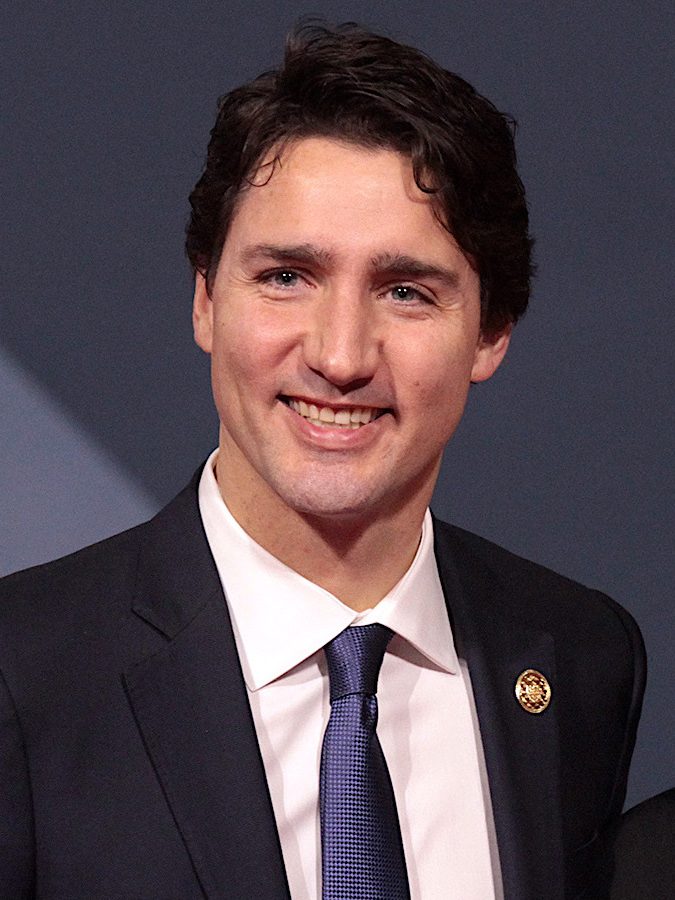
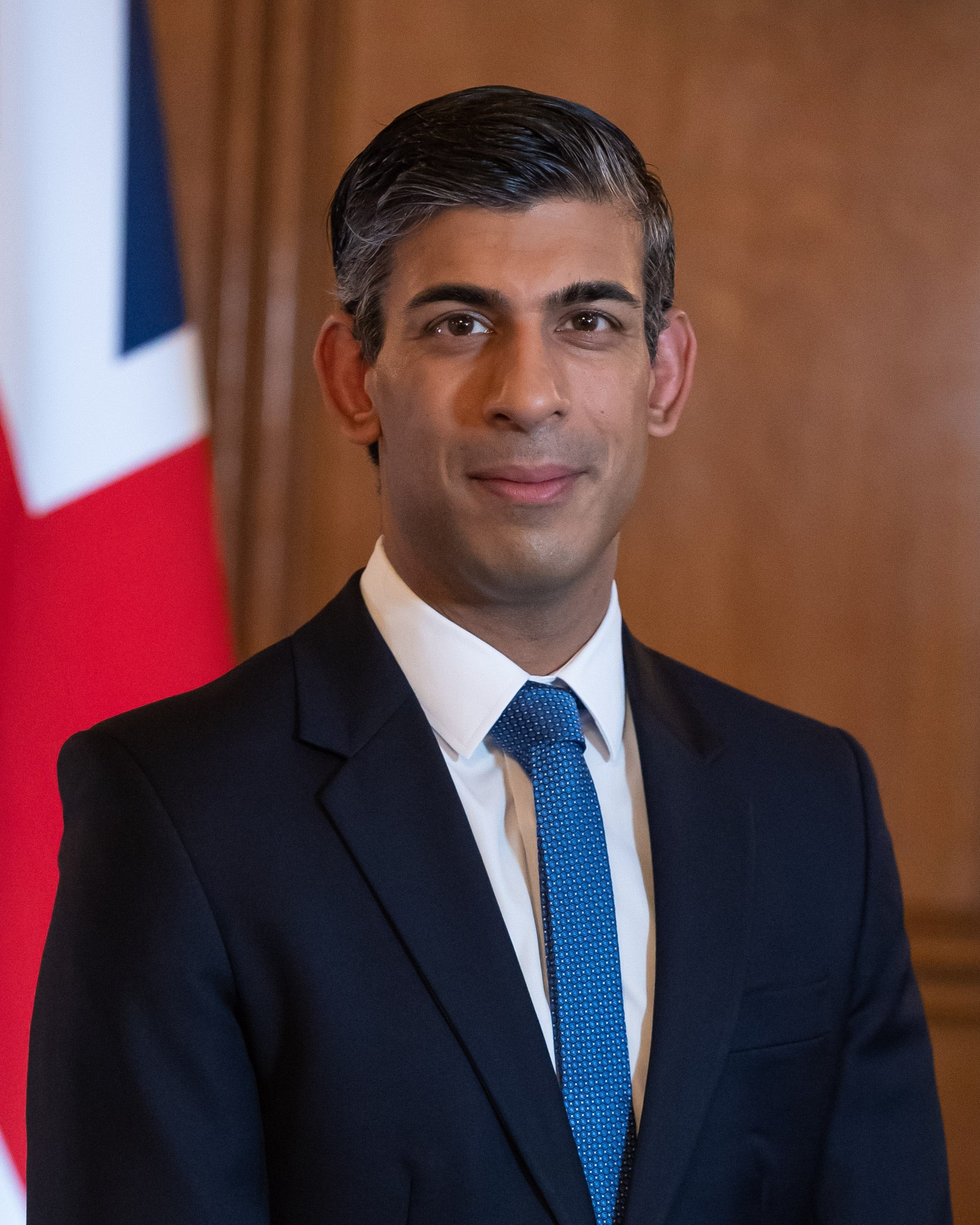
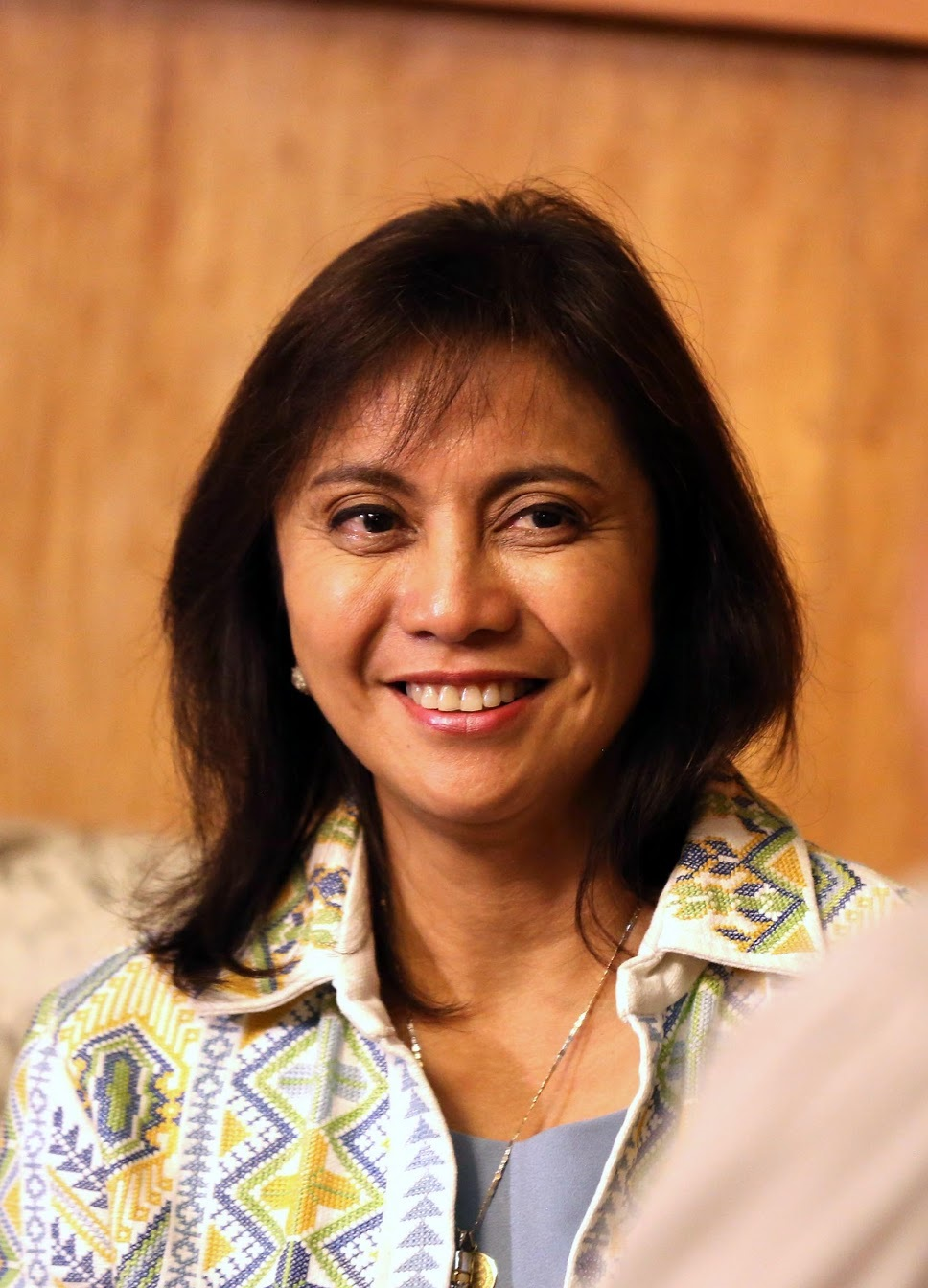
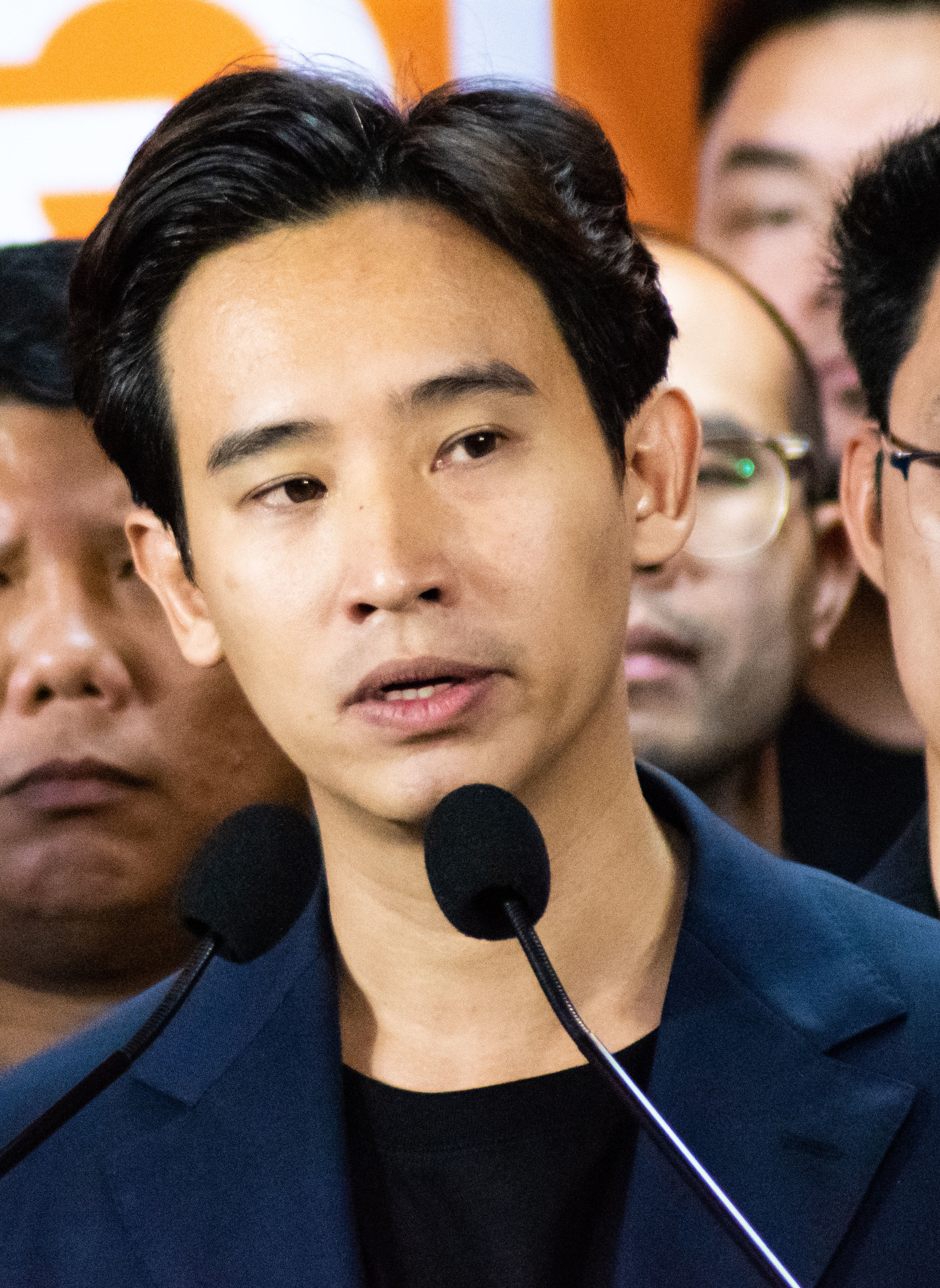
Influential politicians, such as Justin Trudeau in Canada, Rishi Sunak in the U.K., Leni Robredo in the Philippines, and Pita Limjaroenrat in Thailand, have expressed admiration for Swift.

The Guardian columnist Gaby Hinsliff dubbed Swift a trans-Atlantic soft power. In Canada, William Watson of the Financial Post thought that the lawmakers from the Liberal Party of Canada, including Prime Minister Justin Trudeau, will attempt to "nationalize" the distribution of the concert tour tickets in an attempt to win over Swifties in the 45th Canadian federal election. Members of the Canadian Parliament filed a grievance with the Speaker of the House of Commons, when the Eras Tour was initially poised to skip Canada.

Gabriel Boric, former President of Chile, sought the help of Swifties in his presidential campaign; multiple media outlets have described Boric as a full-fledged Swiftie; he described himself as a Swiftie before the 2021 Chilean general election, which he won. During the 2023 Guatemalan general election, presidential candidate Bernardo Arévalo referred to the 2009 Kanye West–Taylor Swift incident in a TikTok video, revealing himself to be a Swiftie. The video quickly went viral among young voters, which benefitted his presidential campaign during the first round of polling, where he qualified to participate in the second round and subsequently became the president-elect of Guatemala.

In the 2026 Brazilian general election, Brazilian Swifties and various other fandoms formed an Internet coalition, consisting of 20 million followers, to support incumbent President Luiz Inácio Lula da Silva against the conservative candidate Flávio Bolsonaro. Bolsonaro's supporters attempted to disarm the coalition by emailing 13 Management, Swift's in-house management team, to demand they neutralize the political use of Swift's imagery by her fans in Brazil and accused them of complicity in the United States' interference in Brazilian democracy. Lula da Silva subsequently won the election as the first presidential candidate in Brazilian history to lose the first round and win the final round.

==== Asia-Pacific ====
Leni Robredo, former Vice President of the Philippines, appealed to Swifties during her vice-presidential tenure. Swifties formed a significant portion of Robredo's supporters during her 2022 Philippine presidential election campaign. Pita Limjaroenrat, member of the House of Representatives of Thailand and leader of opposition, declared himself a fan of Swift and invited her to visit Thailand. A number of Australian government officials, including the Deputy Premier of Queensland, Steven Miles; Member of Parliament from Western Australia and the Prime Minister's aide, Patrick Gorman; and the South Australian minister for infrastructure and transport, Tom Koutsantonis, were openly disappointed with Swift not touring their states.

Bloomberg News reported that, in China (People's Republic of China), the themes celebrated in Swift's music and other outputs "stand in stark contrast to CCP General Secretary Xi Jinping's increasingly conservative vision for women, providing a rare outlet for young women rejecting ever-tighter social control and the Chinese Communist Party (CCP)'s rigid expectations." The Washington Post's Meaghan Tobin and Pei-Lin Wu observed that, despite the strict censorship practices in China, "Swift has managed to steer clear of scrutiny ... In fact, Chinese state media seems to have nothing but praise for [her]." Thomas Friedman of The New York Times said Swift could a key element in improving the China–United States relations. In its counterpart Taiwan, officially the Republic of China, Swift was a divisive topic in the campaigns preceding the 2024 Taiwanese presidential and legislative body elections. Politician Jaw Shaw-kong, a prominent member of the opposition party Kuomintang, stated in a televised debate that he invited Swift to hold a concert at the Taipei Dome and that she initially agreed to perform but soon declined, citing "geopolitical risks" of the tense bilateral relations between Taiwan and the People's Republic of China. The Taiwanese Ministry of Culture neither denied or confirmed Jaw's claims but said several foreign artists have performed in Taiwan. Kaohsiung mayor Chen Chi-mai described Jaw's claim about Swift as an attempt to manipulate voters.

In 2026, as part of the 2026 Delhi Jantar Mantar protests, promotional montages shared by the Cockroach Janata Party (CJP), an Indian youth-based activist movement, criticized the Prime Minister of India, Narendra Modi, and the then-Minister of Education of India, Dharmendhra Pradhan, by featuring Swift's 2022 single "Anti-Hero" in the video and making prominent use of the song's lyrics to mock them both and the regime.

==== Europe ====
Swedish prime minister Ulf Kristersson and Mexican Supreme Court justice Arturo Zaldivar also described themselves as Swifties. International organizations such as the European Union (E.U.) have acknowledged her political influence; the Vice-President of the European Commission, Margaritis Schinas, requested Swift to help reverse the "historically low" voter turnout in Europe in the upcoming 2024 European Parliament election. Emmanuel Macron, the President of France since 2017, stated Swift "is one of the few artists who are able to gather so many people" and dubbed her an "impressive" phenomenon.

"She was fantastic. Absolutely fantastic. I know I will be asked what is my favourite song and I am not going to pretend I have got every album and know every song, although Change is the one for obvious reasons. What I learned last night is my daughter knows every album, every song, and every word of every song, and she wasn't alone among the teenage girls who were there. It was utterly brilliant."

— Keir Starmer, Prime Minister of the United Kingdom since 2024, on Swift

In the United Kingdom, three Prime Ministers—Liz Truss, Rishi Sunak and Keir Starmer—have expressed admiration for Swift. Truss met Swift at a BAFTA dinner, saying on a 2024 interview that she "elbowed my way across the room" to demand a selfie with Swift: "I introduced myself as, 'I'm the Chief Secretary to The Treasurer, Taylor. Can I have a selfie?'" In 2020, Truss quoted Swift's song "The Man" at the House of Commons in her International Women's Day speech at the House of Commons, saying "Women are left running as fast as they can, wondering if they would get there quicker if they were a man." Sunak also declared himself a fan of Swift's music; during a debate with Truss he stated that "I agree with Liz on far more than we disagree on — and I don't just mean our shared love for Whitney Houston and Taylor Swift." Downing Street officials said that Sunak attended a Swift concert and a cycling class devoted to her music during a holiday in the US. Starmer attended one of Swift's Eras Tour shows in London with his wife Victoria during the 2024 general election, writing "'Swift' campaign pitstop." He described Swift as "absolutely fantastic" and joked that his favorite song by Swift is "Change", which shares the name of his party's manifesto.

During the 2024 Labour Party freebies controversy, it was reported that several cabinet members including Starmer, Darren Jones, Wes Streeting and Bridget Phillipson had accepted Swift concert tickets. Streeting joked that he had been "outed as a Swiftie", while Phillipson said it was "hard to say no" to Swift concert tickets. In October 2024, it was reported that the London Metropolitan Police's Special Escort Group—a top-level security usually provided for members of the British royal family and heads of state—would be provided for Swift and crew for the remainder of the London shows. A political scandal soon developed in the United Kingdom as the politicians of opposition Conservative Party accused the ruling Labour Party of receiving free tickets to the Eras Tour in exchange of the security grant. It was alleged that Labour politicians, ranging from Starmer to London mayor Sadiq Khan, had received around £20,000 in free tickets, after Swift's demand for the security was initially denied, with the politicians subsequently pressuring the police to give in. The prime minister's office denied that the free tickets were connected to security demands, however admitted that Starmer meeting Swift at the concert could have created a perception of a conflict of interest. Former prime minister Boris Johnson said Swift has made the United Kingdom "look like a banana republic"; Rebecca Reid of i said "the Eras tour has been dragged into a tangential political row" and criticized Johnson of not caring about women's safety; Reid opined that Swift deserves the police convoy in light of the Vienna threat and the Southport stabbing incident.

== Advocacy ==
Nota bene: This section is non-exhaustive and includes illustrative examples only

- On March 23, 2018, Swift called for gun control, donating to victims and to March For Our Lives.
- On June 1, 2019, she created a Change.org petition urging senators to vote for the House-passed Equality Act. As of April 2020, the petition had over 704,000 signatures, including those from Democratic senators like Warren, Amy Klobuchar, Ed Markey, Kirsten Gillibrand, Tim Kaine, and Cory Booker. Swift wrote a letter to Republican Tennessee senator Lamar Alexander, asking him his support: "For American citizens to be denied jobs or housing based on who they love or how they identify is un-American and cruel".
- Swift performed at Stonewall Inn during the WorldPride NYC 2019.
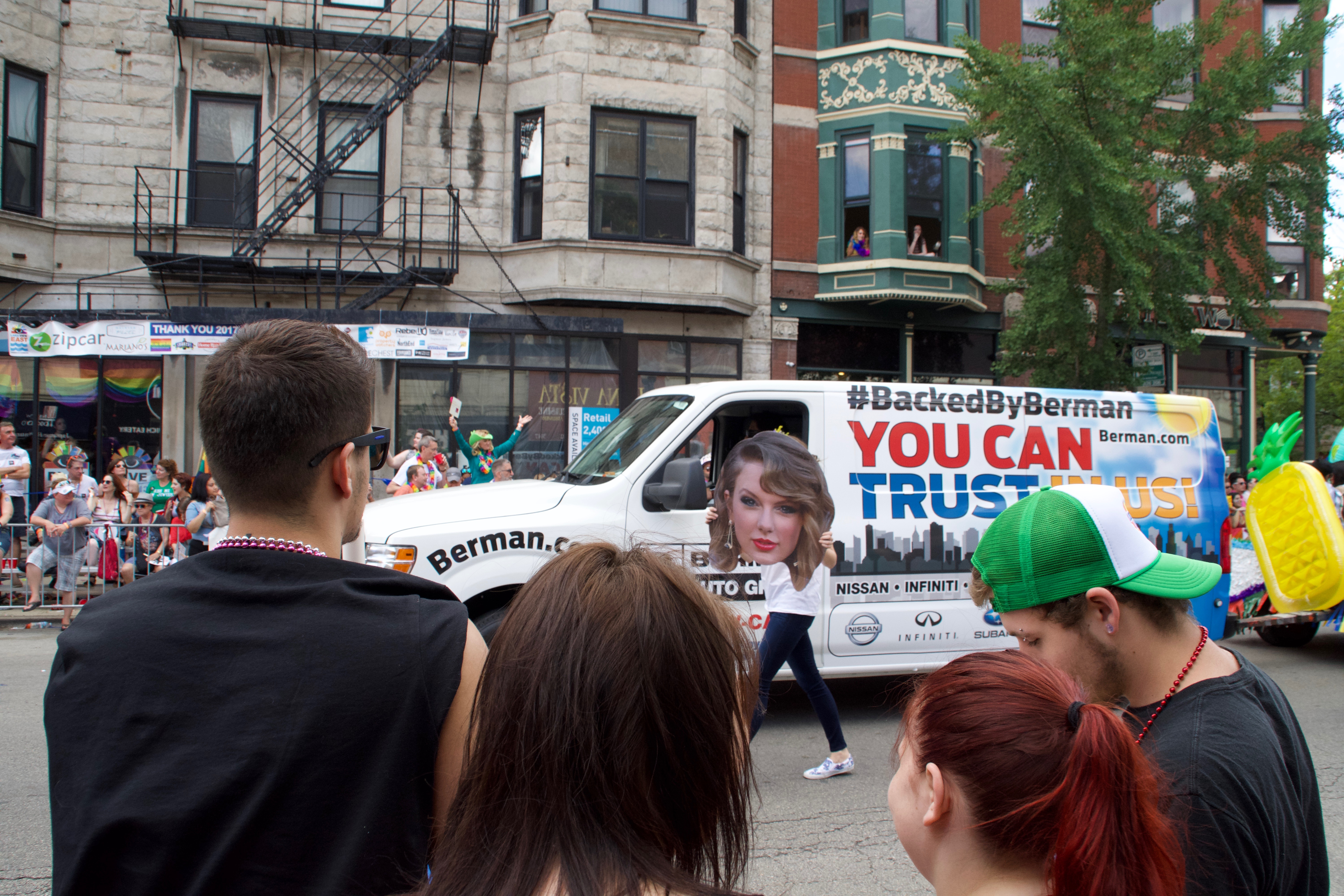
  A cutout of Swift's face being used at the 2017 Chicago Pride Parade
- After "You Need to Calm Down" increased donations to GLAAD, Anthony Ramos, an executive of the organization, stated Swift "is one of the world's biggest pop stars; the fact that she continues to use her platform and music to support the LGBTQ community and the Equality Act is a true sign of being an ally." CEO Sarah Kate Ellis said, Swift "continues to use her platform to speak out against discrimination and create a world where everyone can live the life they love. ... In today's divisive political and cultural climate, we need more allies like Taylor."
- On August 26, 2019, at the 2019 MTV Video Music Awards, after winning Video of the Year for "You Need to Calm Down", Swift urged the audience in her speech to sign the petition and said the White House has not responded despite having "five times the amount of signatures that it would need to warrant a response". The next day, then-White House deputy press secretary Judd Deere issued a statement criticizing the Equality Act.
- On May 29, 2020, Swift criticized Trump's "provocative" tweets regarding the George Floyd protests in Minneapolis–Saint Paul, and after the wide George Floyd protests, she donated to the NAACP Legal Defense and Educational Fund and Black Lives Matter movement, voiced for removing the Confederate monuments in Tennessee, and called for Juneteenth to become a national holiday. Swift's tweet criticizing Trump became her most-liked tweet, garnering over two million likes. In the Forbes article "Taylor Swift And The Tweet That Could Help Take Down A President", Cohen said Swift's political voice "could have enormous political consequences" as surveys indicate white women and young first-time voters—Trump's weakest demographics—both forming significant portions of Swift's U.S. fanbase, and "will therefore be key to the outcome of the 2020 election."
- On December 8, 2023, Swift attended a stand-up comedy show in New York hosted by Ramy Youssef in support of Gaza in the midst of the war and genocide in the region, with all proceeds from the show being donated to American Near East Refugee Aid (ANERA).

== Legislative action ==
Swift has inspired a number of bills, such as:

- In March 2015, impelled by Swift's purchase of the Rhode Island estate High Watch, then-state governor Gina Raimondo proposed a luxury tax on second homes worth over $1 million in the state, referred to as the "Taylor Swift tax". It was withdrawn after wide criticism, but was reintroduced in July 2025 under the title "Non-Owner Occupied Property Tax Act" and enacted by the Rhode Island General Assembly as part of the state's budget for 2026.
- On May 19, 2023, members of the Massachusetts General Court introduced the bipartisan "Taylor Swift Bill" to require ticketing companies disclose full ticket costs upfront and outlaw dynamic pricing. Similar bills were introduced in the state legislatures of Minnesota and California.
- On May 22, 2023, Texas governor Greg Abbott signed the "Save Our Swifties" bill into law, banning the use of bots to bulk-purchase tickets. Similar bills were launched in New York and Washington.
- In June 2023, U.S. Congressmen Pascrell and Frank Pallone drafted the BOSS and SWIFT (Better Oversight of Stub Sales and Strengthening Well Informed and Fair Transactions for Audiences of Concert Ticketing) Act in the House of Representatives, mandating an overhaul of ticket sale and resale platforms.
- In June 2023, an anti-scalping "Taylor Swift Bill" was proposed to the National Congress of Brazil.
- In November 2023, Brazilian congresswoman Erika Hilton, who represents the state of São Paulo in the Chamber of Deputies, introduced a bill to make free water mandatory at concerts and penalize companies that prohibit water bottles in venues, following the death of a concert attendee at the Eras Tour due to dehydration. Subsequently, around 100 municipal, state and federal legislatures in Brazil, including the state of Rio de Janeiro and the federal district, drafted or passed similar bills. In September 2026, the bill—nicknamed "the Taylor Swift Law"—was signed into federal law by Brazilian president Lula da Silva.
- In January 2024, U.S. Senators Klobuchar, Dick Durbin, Lindsey Graham, and Josh Hawley introduced the DEFIANCE (Disrupt Explicit Forged Images and Non-Consensual Edit) Act to criminalize "digital forgeries" that depict an identifiable person without their consent, after AI-generated deepfake pornographic images portraying Swift were posted to and spread on social media.
- In February 2024, the EU drafted a bill criminalizing the sharing of "nude deepfakes" and revenge porn by mid-2027. Věra Jourová, a European Commission vice president, opined, "The latest disgusting way of humiliating women is by sharing intimate images generated by AI in a couple of minutes by anybody. Such pictures can do huge harm, not only to popstars but to every woman who would have to prove at work or at home that it was a deepfake."
- In May 2024, Minnesota governor Tim Walz signed a so-called "Taylor Swift bill" into law, which requires ticket sellers to disclose all fees upfront and prohibits the resale of more than one copy of a ticket.

== See also ==
- Music and politics
- Public image of Taylor Swift
- Impact of the Eras Tour
