= Miss Colombia (disambiguation) =

Miss Colombia is a pageant title for the country of Colombia.

Miss Colombia may refer to:

- Miss Universe Colombia, a national female beauty pageant associated with Miss Universe
- Miss Mundo Colombia, a national female beauty pageant associated with Miss World
- Miss Tierra Colombia, a national female beauty pageant associated with Miss Earth
- Miss International Colombia, a national female beauty pageant title associated with Miss International
- Miss Maja Colombia, a national female beauty pageant that is not affiliated with a global contest
- Miss Colombia (album), a 2020 album by Lido Pimienta

== See also ==
- Miss Columbia (disambiguation)
- Miss District of Columbia (disambiguation)
- Colombia (disambiguation)
- Columbia (disambiguation)
