= Miss America (disambiguation) =

Miss America is an annual competition open to women.

Miss America may also refer to:

== Characters ==
- Miss America (DC Comics), a Quality Comics and later DC Comics character
- Miss America (Marvel Comics), a list of Marvel Comics characters named Miss America
  - Miss America (Madeline Joyce), a Marvel Comics character
  - Miss America (America Chavez), a Marvel Comics character
- Miss America, a member of the Battle Fever J Super Sentai Series
- Miss America, a character in Coonskin

== Music ==
- Chocolate USA or Miss America, a US rock band
- Miss America (Mary Margaret O'Hara album) (1988)
- Miss America (Saving Abel album) (2010)
- Miss America (book), the second autobiography of American radio and media personality Howard Stern
- "Miss America" (Styx song) (1977)
- "Miss America" (J. Cole song), 2012
- "Miss America" (Måns Zelmerlöw song), 2008
- "Miss America" (Saving Abel song), 2010
- "Miss America" (The Big Dish song), 1990
- "Miss America", a 1970 song by Mark Lindsay
- "Miss America", a 1993 song by Blur, from the album Modern Life Is Rubbish
- "Miss America", a 1997 song by David Byrne from Feelings
- "Miss America", a 2026 song by Brandon Flowers from Thrasher

== Other uses ==
- Miss America (film), a 2002 documentary film
- Miss America (speedboats), a line of speedboats raced by Garfield Wood
- Miss America, a title awarded in 1919 to Edith Hyde Robbins Macartney (preceding the modern title competition by a year)
- Miss America, a pseudonym of the winning female of the first Paris–Rouen cycle race

== See also ==
- Miss Americana or Taylor Swift: Miss Americana, a 2020 American documentary
- Ms. America Pageant
- Miss Teen America, a beauty contest for teenage girls
- Miss United States, a beauty contest that has been held annually since 1926
- Miss USA, a beauty contest that has been held annually since 1952
- Mrs. America (disambiguation)
  - Mrs. America (contest), a beauty contest for married American women
- America (disambiguation)
- Miss Columbia (disambiguation), Columbia being a female national personification of the United States of America as well as a historical name applied to the Americas and to the New World
