= Only the Young (Taylor Swift song) =

Promotional single by Taylor Swift
- Released: January 31, 2020
- Genre: Synth-pop
- Length: 2:37
- Label: Republic
- Songwriters: Taylor Swift; Joel Little
- Producers: Taylor Swift; Joel Little

Lyric video
- "Only the Young" on YouTube

"Only the Young" is a song by the American singer-songwriter Taylor Swift. It was released on January 31, 2020, through Republic Records, as a promotional single for Miss Americana, a 2020 Netflix documentary on Taylor Swift. In the film's closing credits, the song is featured. Held back from being included on Swift's seventh studio album, Lover (2019), the song was both written and produced by Swift and Joel Little, inspired by the 2018 United States elections.

The song is a synth-pop tune and features backing vocals from Little's daughters. As a protest song, "Only the Young" discusses subjects such as school shootings, Donald Trump, and vote-tampering concerns in its lyrics. Upon release, music critics praised Swift's lyricism on United States politics, addressing matters such as gun violence and mass shootings. Some critics have noted it as Swift's most politically charged song yet.

"Only the Young" won the People's Choice Award for the Best Soundtrack Song of 2020. The song entered the charts in several countries worldwide, reaching the top 20 in Scotland and the Netherlands, top 40 in Australia, Hungary, and Ireland, as well as the top 50 in Belgium and the US. It debuted at number one on the Billboard Digital Song Sales, becoming Swift's record-extending nineteenth number-one song on the chart. The song was used in a video advertisement for the Biden/Harris campaign in the 2020 United States presidential election.

== Background and release ==
In an interview with Chris Willman of Variety, Swift revealed that she held back "Only the Young" from being included on her seventh studio album Lover (2019). She also revealed that the song is both co-written and co-produced with Joel Little, who worked with Swift on four songs for the album including "Miss Americana & the Heartbreak Prince", from which the title of the documentary comes, Swift further said that the song is not intended to be a single, but a song for her 2020 Netflix documentary, Miss Americana. Little added the song was the last he and Swift worked on during a week in New York City, following "The Man" and "Me!", and that his two daughters contributed backing vocals to the song. Swift released "Only the Young" on January 31, 2020, as a promotional single with an accompanying lyric video. She wrote the song after the 2018 United States elections. Prior to the elections, Swift broke her political silence by endorsing two Democrats: Congressman Jim Cooper for re-election to the House of Representatives, and former Tennessee governor Phil Bredesen for the Senate. Swift also criticized the voting record of Bredesen's opponent Republican Marsha Blackburn.

It was hard to see so many people feel like they had canvassed and done everything and tried so hard. I saw a lot of young people's hopes dashed. And I found that to be particularly tragic, because young people are the people who feel the worst effects of gun violence, and student loans and trying to figure out how to start their lives and how to pay their bills, and climate change, and are we going to war – all these horrific situations that we find ourselves facing right now.

— Swift speaking to Variety

Although Tennessee governor Phil Bredesen lost the Senate race against Marsha Blackburn, Swift helped to motivate young voters to get registered to vote. Around 65,000 Americans, ages 18 to 29, registered to vote in the 24 hours after Swift's Instagram post urging her followers to vote. By noon the next day that number was up to 102,000.

== Composition ==
"Only the Young"
A sample of the final chorus in "Only the Young", in which Swift sings the hook, backed by vocals from Little's daughters.

"Only the Young" has been described as a "synth-pop tribute to the next generation of political activists." Swift's vocal range in the song spans between E♭_{3} to B♭_{4}. The song is written in the key of E-flat major and has a moderately fast tempo of 94 beats per minute. The backing vocals to the song are a kids choir that features Joel Little's two young daughters harmonizing with themselves. "Only the Young" incorporates political lyrics, in contrast to Swift's earlier works that were politically neutral. Swift urges young citizens to get involved in politics if they want things to change. She does this by alluding to 2017–2021 US President Donald Trump, the 2016 presidential election, the succeeding vote tampering allegations, and issues like gun violence and school shootings in the United States. Willman termed the song "an anthem for millennials who might've come away disillusioned with the political process". Joel Little said "Lyrically, that song has got so many gut punches in it — just really important lines, I feel. As that song was coming together and we were realizing what it was saying, it was a very emotional aura. The energy in the room was really intense. Knowing the way things have been going in the States lately with all these horrible shootings and everything, for her to be saying these things made it all the more powerful.”

== Critical reception ==
Entertainment Weekly writer Lauren Huff dubbed "Only the Young" a "political anthem" with lyrics aimed at American youth. Billboard's Gil Kaufman called the song an "urgent, clear-eyed" tune that sees Swift "giving voice to her disillusionment about our stuck society". He described the theme as "a sad concession and a defiant warning" to older generations on how "their greed and failure to act has given rise to a youth movement determined to turn the page". Vulture's Zoey Haylock found the song to be urging the listeners to "get out there and participate in democracy", and added that it exudes Swift's faith in the American youth.

Rolling Stone writer Claire Shaffer wrote that the song documents the singer's "recent political awakening" as seen in Miss Americana. Stereogum's James Rettig opined that the song finds Swift "reckoning with the current political climate and her place in it". Writing for Taste of Country, Jacklyn Krol commented that the song could be Swift's most politically charged song yet. Slate's Chloe Hadavas compared the lyrics of "Only the Young" to those of Swift's other politically charged songs: "The Man" (2019) and "Miss Americana & the Heartbreak Prince" (2019), adding that it is the latest addition to her "budding canon of protest songs", focusing "less on feminist and queer issues than on the cause of rallying younger generations". Paper's Jael Goldfine defined the song as the musical accompaniment to Swift's "newly radicalized political identity"—"the Democrat-voting, Dixie Chicks-defending, nice-girl-no-more that she crafts in Miss Americana". Cosmopolitan's Starr Bowenbank also labelled the song as Swift's most political song to-date. Nylon's Layla Halabian termed the song a hopeful anthem "over a shimmering pop production", encouraging the youth to "challenge the establishment and secure a safer future".

=== Accolades ===
Empire critics Ella Kemp and Ben Travis listed "Only the Young" as one of the best soundtrack songs of 2020. Michael Ordoña, writing for Los Angeles Times, listed "Only the Young" as one of 2021's Oscar-contending songs, remarking that it underscores Swift's status as a "significant cultural figure", evolving from her former "sugar-pop queen" image. Ordoña described the song as an "unabashedly political-while-still-catchy earworm".

Awards and nominations for "Only the Young"
Year	Organization	Award	Result	Ref.
2020	People's Choice Awards	Soundtrack Song of 2020	Won	
2021	Hollywood Music in Media Awards	Best Original Song – Documentary	Nominated	

== Commercial performance ==
In the United States, buoyed by 30,000 sales in its first week, "Only the Young" debuted at number one on the Billboard Digital Song Sales chart, becoming Swift's record-extending 19th number-one song on the chart. The song also debuted at number 50 on the Billboard Hot 100 chart, becoming her ninety-seventh Hot 100 entry. In New Zealand, it peaked at number two on the Official New Zealand Hot Singles chart. Elsewhere, "Only the Young" reached numbers 13, 20, 31 and 40 on Scottish Singles, the Netherlands' Single Tip, Australia's ARIA Singles and Irish Singles, respectively. In May 2022, the song debuted at number 23 on the Billboard Philippines Songs chart, following the results of the 2022 Philippine presidential election.

== Usage in media ==
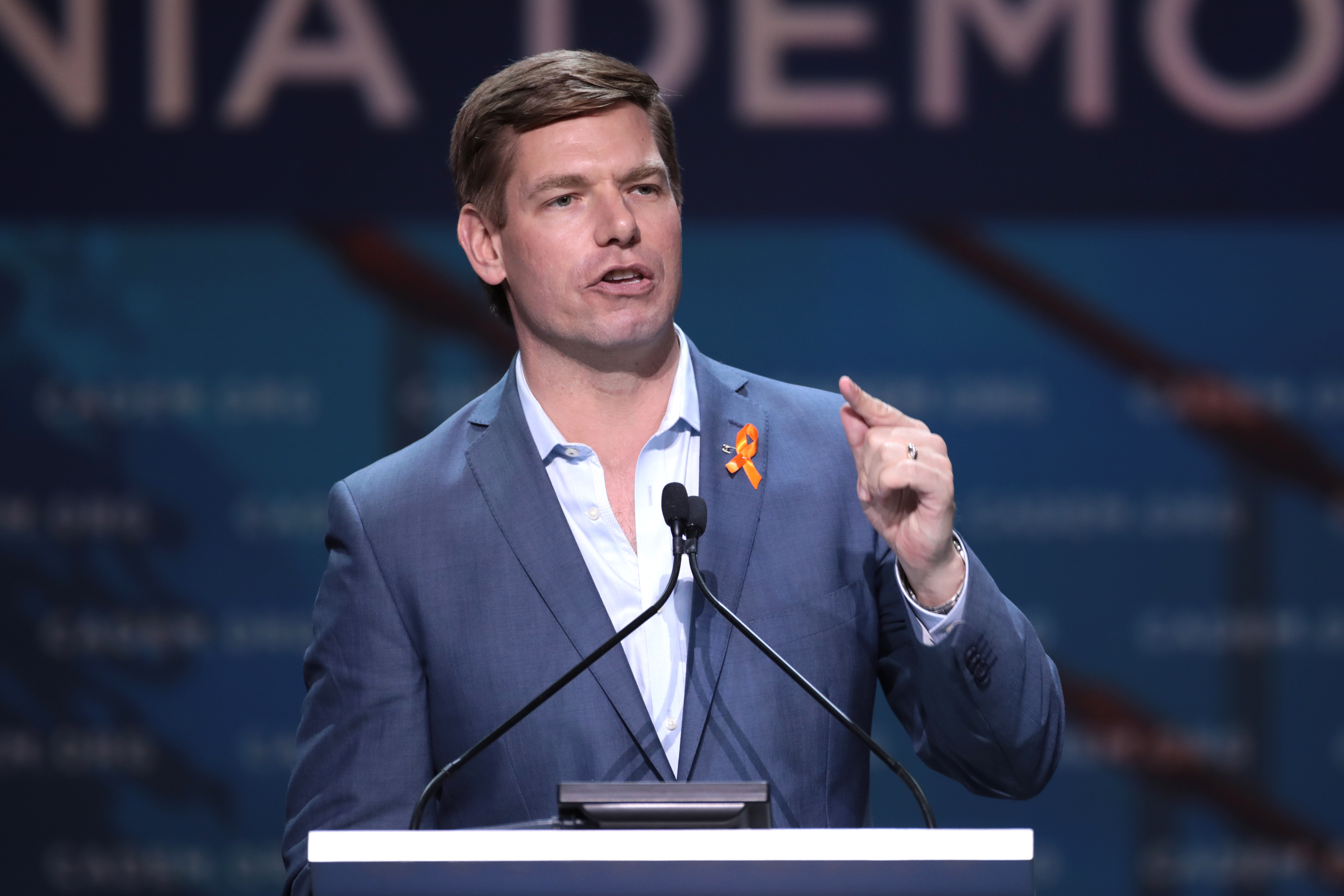
The American politician Eric Swalwell, a Representative from California, requested Swift for the usage of "Only the Young" in the Democrat advertisement.

As a country musician, I was always told it's better to stay out of politics. The Trump presidency forced me to lean in and educate myself. I found myself talking about government and the presidency and policy with my boyfriend, who supported me in speaking out. I started talking to my family and friends about politics and learning as much as I could about where I stand. I'm proud to have moved past fear and self-doubt, and to endorse and support leadership that moves us beyond this divisive, heartbreaking moment in time.

— Swift on finding her political voice, Vanity Fair

"Only the Young" was soundtracked in an advertisement as a part of Democratic campaigns in 2020 United States presidential elections. Californian representative Eric Swalwell revealed that Swift allowed the usage of the song for the Biden/Harris campaign free-of-cost, marking the first time Swift has lent her music to be used in a political advertisement.

The video advertisement was released on October 30, 2020. It opens with a quote from vice presidential candidate Kamala Harris wondering why "so many powerful people are making it so difficult to vote". The rest of the video features a montage of "chaotic and hopeful" scenes from the past four years in the US: Clips of #MeToo and Black Lives Matter protesters, President Trump removing his face mask following a hospitalization for COVID-19, Judge Amy Coney Barrett being sworn in as a Supreme Court justice, a 75-year-old protester in Buffalo being pushed to the ground by police, and a scene of young voters and supporters of Democratic presidential nominee (and eventual winner) Joe Biden organizing and taking part in early voting. The lyrics "And the big bad man and his big bad clan / Their hands are stained with red / Oh, how quickly, they forget" are timed to play over photos of Trump, Senators Mitch McConnell and Lindsey Graham, and Attorney General Bill Barr. The video ends with the motto: "You've marched for four years. Now it's time to run", and many popular hashtags, including #MeToo, #ICantBreathe, #WearAMask, #BidenHarris2020, #SaveUSPS and #Vote. Harris responded with thanks to Swift, and added that the singer is showing the American youth "what's at stake" in the election.

On November 6, 2020, South Korean channel JTBC used "Only the Young" as its closing song for the day's JTBC Newsroom—the evening newscast on the channel. The song has also been widely used in the 2022 Philippine presidential election campaign of the 14th Vice President and Liberal Party presidential candidate, Leni Robredo. In November 2024, the song was performed at Koncerthuset by the Danish National Symphony Orchestra, DR Big Band and the Danish National Vocal Ensemble, with Miho Hazama as the conductor and Stine Hjelm as the vocalist. The song formed part of the program of a two-night concert by the Danish Broadcasting Corporation's "Stjerner og Striber" (Stars and Stripes) podcast as part of their coverage for the 2024 United States elections.

== Credits and personnel ==
Credits adapted from Tidal.

- Taylor Swift – vocals, songwriter, producer
- Joel Little – producer, songwriter, programmer, recording engineer, keyboards
- Emmie Little – backing vocals
- Lila Little – backing vocals
- Serban Ghenea – mixer
- John Hanes – mix engineer
- John Rooney – assistant recording engineer

== Charts ==
Chart performance for "Only the Young"
Chart (2020–2022)	Peak position
Australia (ARIA)	31
Belgium (Ultratop 50 Flanders)	45
Canada Hot 100 (Billboard)	57
Croatia (HRT)	82
Czech Republic Singles Digital (ČNS IFPI)	86
France (SNEP Sales Chart)	35
Hungary (Single Top 40)	31
Ireland (IRMA)	40
Netherlands (Single Tip)	20
New Zealand Hot Singles (RMNZ)	2
Philippines (Billboard)	23
Portugal (AFP)	139
Scottish Singles Sales (Official Charts)	13
Slovakia Singles Digital (ČNS IFPI)	89
UK Singles (Official Charts)	57
US Billboard Hot 100	50
US Rolling Stone Top 100	30

== Certifications ==
Certifications for "Only the Young"
Region	Certification	Certified units/sales
Australia (ARIA)	Gold	35,000^{‡}
Brazil (Pro-Música Brasil)	Gold	20,000^{‡}
^{‡} Sales+streaming figures based on certification alone.

== Release history ==
Release history and formats for "Only the Young"
Country	Date	Format	Label	Ref.
Various	January 31, 2020	Digital download; streaming	Republic	

== See also ==
- List of Billboard Digital Song Sales number ones of 2020
