= Miss District of Columbia (disambiguation) =

The Miss District of Columbia competition is the pageant that selects the representative for the District of Columbia in the Miss America pageant.

Miss District of Columbia may also refer to:

- Miss District of Columbia USA, a subsidiary beauty pageant of Miss USA
- Miss District of Columbia Teen USA, a subsidiary beauty pageant of Miss Teen USA

== See also ==
- Miss Columbia (disambiguation)
- Miss Colombia (disambiguation)
- District of Columbia (disambiguation)
- Columbia (disambiguation)
- Colombia (disambiguation)
