= Mrs. America =

Mrs. America may refer to:

- Mrs. America (miniseries), a 2020 US television mini-series
- Mrs. America (contest), a US national beauty pageant

== See also ==
- Mr. and Mrs. America, a 1945 film
- Mr. America (disambiguation)
- Miss America (disambiguation)
