= Miss Columbia (disambiguation) =

Miss Columbia is the female personification of the United States of America.

Miss Columbia may also refer to:

- Miss Columbia (WB-2), an airplane, S/N#1, for the Wright-Bellanca WB-2

== See also ==
- Miss District of Columbia (disambiguation), a beauty pageant title
- Miss Colombia (disambiguation)
- Miss America (disambiguation)
- Columbia (disambiguation)
- Colombia (disambiguation)
