= Miss Maja Colombia =

Maja Colombia
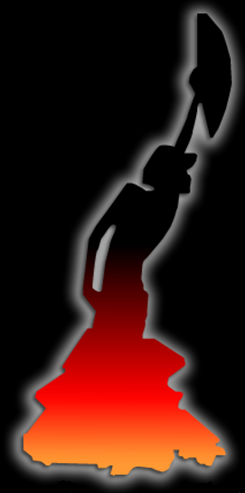
- Logo of Miss Maja Colombia
- Type: Beauty pageant
- Location: Corozal (Colombia)
- Official language: Español

Miss Maja Colombia is a female beauty contest with the participation of delegates from various departments and cities of Colombia. The winner gets the title of "Miss Maja Colombia". The event is held annually in Corozal, Sucre.

== History ==
Founded in 1970 by members of the board of the Corozal's Country Club, the "Interclubes Reign", with the purpose of integrating the different social clubs of the Colombian Caribbean.

The term maja, is commonly used in Spain to refer to a beautiful woman. This term has an Indian-gypsy origin, meaning "magic". In the case of Miss Maja, contestants must have that "magic" quality, as well as being sympathetic, elegant, natural, and have a generous heart.

The last edition of this event was held in 2013, when Mayra Vitoviz, Miss Maja Colombia 2012, resigned her title because of her disappointment in what the prize promised, but failed to accomplish.

== See also ==
- Miss Colombia
- Miss Earth Colombia
- Miss Mundo Colombia
