= Miss Americana =

2020 documentary film by Lana Wilson

- Netflix poster
- Directed by: Lana Wilson
- Produced by: Morgan Neville; Caitrin Rogers; Christine O'Malley
- Starring: Taylor Swift
- Cinematography: Emily Topper
- Edited by: Paul Marchand; Greg O'Toole; Lee Rosch; Lindsay Utz; Jason Zeldes
- Music by: Taylor Swift; Alex Somers
- Production company: Tremolo Productions
- Distributed by: Netflix
- Release dates: January 23, 2020 (Sundance); January 31, 2020 (United States)
- Running time: 85 minutes
- Country: United States
- Language: English

Miss Americana (also known as Taylor Swift: Miss Americana) is a 2020 American documentary film that follows the singer-songwriter Taylor Swift and her life over the course of several years of her career. It was directed by Lana Wilson, produced by Tremolo Productions, and released to Netflix and select theaters on January 31, 2020. The film is titled after "Miss Americana & the Heartbreak Prince", a 2019 song by Swift.

The film has been described as an unvarnished and emotionally revealing look at Swift, during a metamorphic phase in her life, as she learns to accept her role as not only a singer-songwriter and entertainer, but as an influential woman "harnessing the full power of her voice." It is set in the time period spanning from Swift's Reputation Stadium Tour (2018) to the release roll-out of her seventh studio album, Lover (2019), dotted with flashback video clips portraying several undisclosed events of her life and career.

Premiering at the opening night of the 2020 Sundance Film Festival on January 23, 2020, Miss Americana was praised for its emotion, intimacy, and vulnerable topics. Reviews complimented Swift's honesty and personality. Accompanying the film's release, "Only the Young", a song by Swift featured in the end credits, was released as a promotional single. Miss Americana was selected by the National Board of Review as one of the five best documentaries of 2020. Publications have named it amongst the best Netflix films and biographical documentaries and regard it as a pivotal moment for Swift's career.

== Synopsis ==
Miss Americana follows Swift during a transitional phase in her career, as she wraps up her 2018 Reputation Stadium Tour and began creating her 2019 album Lover, while covering several years of her life through a biographical compilation of interviews, flashbacks, studio footage, home videos, cellphone videos and concert recordings. It focuses on sensitive subjects that Swift often avoided in interviews, such as her past battle with body dysmorphia and eating disorder, her mother's cancer diagnosis, the toxic Internet culture and media scrutiny she faces, her sexual assault trial, and decision to go public with her political views, including LGBTQ+ allyship.

Netflix described the film as a "raw and emotionally revealing look" at Swift "during a transformational period in her life as she learns to embrace her role not only as a songwriter and performer, but as a woman harnessing the full power of her voice". The Sundance Institute outlined: "Director Lana Wilson offers a multifaceted window into Swift, her creative process, and her singular experience of being one of the brightest lights on the world's global stage. Showcasing Swift's trademark vulnerability and her fierce intelligence and wit, Wilson captures moments both tender and exhilarating as the superstar embarks on the latest chapter of her already extraordinary career."

== Cast ==
- Taylor Swift
- Andrea Swift, mother
- Scott Swift, father
- Abigail Anderson Lucier, friend
- Tree Paine, publicist
- Robert G. Allen, manager
- Joe Alwyn, actor
- Jack Antonoff, record producer
- Joel Little, record producer
- Max Martin, record producer
- Dave Meyers, music video director
- Brendon Urie, musician
- Todrick Hall, musician
- Paul Sidoti, guitarist
- Kamilah Marshall, singer
- Melanie Nyema, singer

Additionally, the archive footages used in the documentary feature record producer Calvin Harris, singers Beyoncé, P!nk, Selena Gomez, Harry Styles, Shakira and Lenny Kravitz, music bands Dixie Chicks and Earth Wind & Fire, reality TV star Kim Kardashian, rapper Ye, US politicians Marsha Blackburn and Donald Trump, actors Taylor Lautner and Tom Hiddleston, drag queens Jade Jolie and Riley Knoxx, television personalities Barbara Walters, Dan Harris, David Letterman, Erin Robinson, Graham Norton, Hoda Kotb, Jedediah Bila, Jenny Johnson, Jimmy Fallon, JuJu Chang, Nancy O'Dell, Nikki Glaser, Phil McGraw, Sara Haines, Stephen Colbert, Sunny Hostin, Whoopi Goldberg, and the entire "Fab 5" cast of Queer Eye: Antoni Porowski, Bobby Berk, Karamo Brown, Jonathan Van Ness and Tan France.

== Production ==
=== Development ===
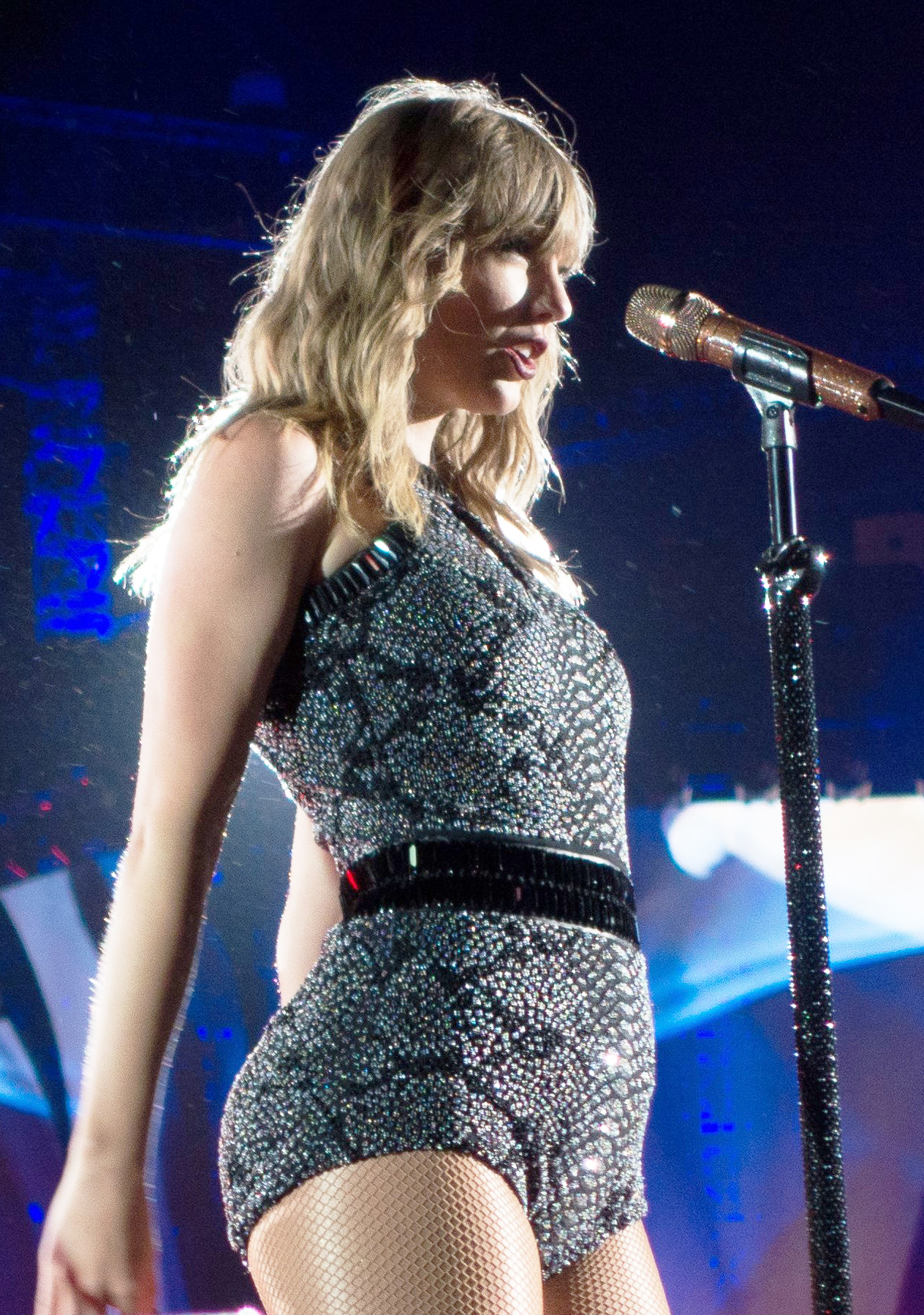
Swift expressed her interest in making a documentary with Netflix following her 2018 special, Taylor Swift: Reputation Stadium Tour.

Swift expressed interest in making a documentary with Netflix following the concert film Taylor Swift: Reputation Stadium Tour, which premiered on the streaming platform in December 2018. She was provided with a list of potential directors, of which Wilson was one. Wilson began filming at the end of the Reputation album and tour cycle, and joined Swift for recording sessions of her subsequent album Lover.

The title of the documentary is borrowed from "Miss Americana & the Heartbreak Prince", the seventh track on Lover, in which Swift expressed her disillusionment over the current state of United States politics.

Swift revealed the documentary in November 2019, when she said the owner and founder of her former label Big Machine Records, Scooter Braun and Scott Borchetta respectively, blocked her from using older music and performance footage for the documentary. She added that the documentary does not mention Braun, Borchetta, or Big Machine. Big Machine denied the accusations in a statement. In response, a representative for Swift published an email from a Big Machine executive refusing to issue licences in connection to the documentary. In December, Variety reported Big Machine had cleared the use of Swift's older material for the film.

Needing to speak up about beliefs I'd always had, because it felt like an opportunity to shed light on what those trials are like. I experienced it as a person with extreme privilege, so I can only imagine what it's like when you don't have that. And I think one theme that ended up emerging in the film [Miss Americana] is what happens when you are not just a people pleaser but someone who's always been respectful of authority figures, doing what you were supposed to do, being polite at all costs. I still think it's important to be polite, but not at all costs. Not when you're being pushed beyond your limits, and not when people are walking all over you. I needed to get to a point where I was ready, able and willing to call out bullshit rather than just smiling my way through it.

— Swift, "Taylor Swift: No Longer 'Polite at All Costs'", Variety

=== Music ===
The documentary includes the song "Only the Young", playing during the end credits, which was released as a promotional single alongside the film. The song was written by Swift after the 2018 United States elections, but did not make it on the track-list of Lover. Upon release, the song received universal acclaim from music critics, who praised its politically charged lyrics that deal with gun violence and school shootings in the United States. "Only the Young" debuted and peaked at number one on the US Billboard Digital Song Sales chart, and entered the charts in several other countries.

== Release and promotion ==
In December 2019, Netflix revealed that the documentary was set to premiere at the 2020 Sundance Film Festival. In an interview with Chris Willman of Variety, it was revealed that the opening act of the film deals with "juxtaposing the joys of creation with the aggravations of global stardom" while the second half is a "provocative turn focused on why Swift became a political animal". Willman wrote that the film further features clips capturing Swift's increasing LGBTQ allyship, Swift's reaction to her mother's cancer diagnosis, and Swift's response to her 2017 album Reputation not receiving any nominations in general categories at the 2019 Grammy Awards. Wilson stated that she views the movie as "looking at the flip side of being America's sweetheart", meant to shed light on the less-glamorous side of fame and stardom.

On January 15, 2020, Swift revealed the release date and a poster of the film through her social media accounts. Six days later, an official trailer to the film was released on YouTube and on Swift's social media accounts. On January 30, Swift announced the list of select theatres that will play Miss Americana, for a limited time. It included 25 Alamo Drafthouse theatres and an iPic theatre in the United States, and the Prince Charles Cinema in the United Kingdom.

== Critical reception ==
On review aggregator website Rotten Tomatoes, the film has an approval rating of 91% based on 92 reviews, with an average rating of 7.4/10. The site's critics consensus reads: "Miss Americana provides an engaging if somewhat deliberately opaque backstage look at a pop star turned cultural phenomenon." On Metacritic, it has a mean score of 65 out of 100, based on 23 critics.

The film premiered at the 2020 Sundance Film Festival to praise and a standing ovation from the critics and audience. Miss Americana has been described as an intimate, genuine, funny and empowering film, documenting "her humble beginnings as a country-music star to her position as an influential figure in pop culture". Reviews complimented the film for Wilson's direction, and the "emotional heft" that came from Swift's vulnerable interviews discussing issues such as eating disorder, self esteem and sexual assault, and for capturing Swift's creative process as well.

Wesley Morris of The New York Times chose Miss Americana as his Critic's Pick, describing it as "85 minutes of translucence" with Swift, stating that she is "self-critical, grown up and ready, perhaps, to deliver a message beyond the music". Nancy Coleman, of the same publication, opined that the film "opens a rare, honest window on what makes this star [Swift] tick". Hannah Woodhead of Little White Lies said the film offers "unprecedented access to the notoriously private singer and her dizzying world" through "interviews, studio footage, home videos and concert recordings". She described it as "glossy, conventional, flicking between past and present with a warm intimacy" as Swift "bares her soul in this intimate, earnest docu-portrait". Slash Film's Chris Evangelita termed the film a "dynamite crowd pleaser" and described it as "a sweet, surprisingly funny portrait of Taylor Swift growing up and getting political". Leslie Felperin of The Hollywood Reporter wrote: "what's ultimately very endearing about Swift is her intelligence and self-awareness, qualities that also make her music compelling, sophisticated and capable of appealing both to adolescent kids and hipster musicologists". Writing for The Salt Lake Tribune, Sean Means stated that the film is "an eye-opening look at Taylor Swift finding a new voice" and "shows Swift as an artist and activist just warming up for the next act". Amber Wilkinson of The Times wrote that the "intimate and open" documentary offers "a much more personal and open consideration of a star who has always been known for her onstage sound and who is now finding her political voice off stage too".

The Atlantic's Spencer Kornhaber wrote that Miss Americana portrays "a pop star facing a daunting challenge—redefining success", acting as "a container for the dictates of supposedly meritocratic capitalist patriarchy". He added that the film does not depict a drastic change but rather "a tough, somewhat deflating process of self-recognition". Decider's Anna Menta commented that "Wilson and her team captured moments that felt personal, vulnerable, and deeply authentic, and they did so with a skill and artistry that Instagram Live stories just can't match". Steve Pond of TheWrap pointed out that "the heart of Miss Americana is Taylor Swift telling us what she stands for on gay rights and women's rights, and what she's learned about the fate of being a woman in the public eye". Glamour's Marie-Claire Chappet wrote: "Miss Americana shows Taylor is sick of the restrictive parameters set out for women in the spotlight. She defies her advisors and gets political — breaking her silence and following in the footsteps of the Dixie Chicks – with thankfully less damaging consequences. She begins using her voice for what she cares about – like LGBTQ rights – and stops caring if Twitter thinks she's over – if the industry doesn't think she's 'likeable'." The New Yorker's Amanda Petrusich concluded that the "beautiful" film is "far more interesting than any acceptance speech, red-carpet interview, or paparazzi photo". In his Critic's Pick review, IndieWire's David Ehrlich wrote that the power of Miss Americana is "watching someone who stands astride the world gradually realize that her art is the only thing that she can control", adding that Wilson is excellent at "splitting the difference that some of her documentary's most humanizing moments are beautiful for how they contradict Swift's intention". He concluded that "it's truly enough to make you feel like an asshole for ever thinking that Swift was some kind of Aryan crypto-fascist, and not just a mega-famous young woman who didn't yet love herself enough to be hated for her convictions".

In a two-star review for The Guardian, Benjamin Lee found Miss Americana too stage-managed and a "brand management dressed up as insight". Nick Allen for RogerEbert.com said the film is "engineered to appease her fans and promote Swift's self-awareness". Mike Ryan of Uproxx wrote that the movie is "frustrating" due to its "lack of depth when discussing interesting issues", instead opting for victory montages. Beth Webb of Empire opined that Miss Americana does not have Swift break any new barriers. Variety's Owen Gleiberman opined that the documentary is "a controlled and sanded-off confection of pop-diva image management", where Swift "presents of herself is just chancy and sincere enough" in the film "to draw us in".

== Accolades ==
Miss Americana won 3 industry awards and received four other nominations. It has been placed in various best-of lists from publications and media outlets.

Year	Award	Category	Result	Ref.
2020	Hollywood Critics Association Midseason Awards	Best Documentary	Runner-up	
2020	Critics' Choice Documentary Awards	Most Compelling Living Subjects of a Documentary (Honor)	Won	
2021	Hollywood Music in Media Awards	Best Original Song in a Documentary	Nominated	
2021	Hollywood Music in Media Awards	Best Music Documentary/Special Program	Nominated	
2021	National Board of Review	Top 5 Documentaries	Won	
2021	Golden Tomato Awards	Favorite Film of 2020	Won	
2021	MTV Movie & TV Awards	Best Music Documentary	Nominated	

=== Lists ===
Critic/Publication	List	Rank	Ref.
Collider	The Best Documentaries of 2020	Placed	
Cosmopolitan	13 Music Documentaries on Netflix, for When You're Missing That IRL Concert Experience	Placed	
Decider	The 15 Best Movies Of 2020... So Far	9	
Decider	Best on Netflix: The Top 12 Musical Movies + Shows for Theater Bugs	16	
Decider	The 10 Best Netflix Documentaries of 2020	5	
Elle	The 16 Best Documentaries Of 2020 (So Far)	15	
Film Threat	Best Biographical Documentaries about Artists on Netflix	Placed	
FM104	2020 Documentaries	Placed	
Forbes	Some Of 2020's Music Documentaries To Watch	Placed	
Glamour	The 18 Best Documentaries of 2020	Placed	
GMA News	Best Movies of 2020	Placed	
Harper's Bazaar	15 Netflix Documentaries That Are Actually Interesting To Watch	Placed	
The Hollywood Reporter	Oscars: The Season of the Documentary	Placed	
IndieWire	Best Movies of 2020 So Far	Placed	
Insider Inc.	12 of the Best Netflix Originals of 2020, so far	3	
Insider Inc.	27 Great Netflix Movies by Women	Placed	
LA Weekly	Best Documentaries of 2020	3	
Manchester Evening News	The 5 Best Music Documentaries to watch on Netflix and Disney+	Placed	
Mashable	The 10 Best Films of 2020 (so far)	9	
Mashable	The 10 Best Documentaries Of 2020 So Far	6	
Mashable	The Best Music Documentaries You Can Stream On Netflix	Placed	
Channel 24	Documentaries about music stars were all the rage in 2020	Placed	
The New York Times	11 Best Netflix Music Documentaries	Placed	
NME	The 50 Best Documentaries of All Time	Placed	
PopSugar	25 Music Documentaries to Watch on Netflix This Week	Placed	
Refinery29	The Best Documentaries about Women	Placed	
Screen Rant	Taylor Swift's 7 Documentaries & Concert Movies, Ranked	1	
Seventeen	Best Movies of 2020	9	
SheKnows	7 Music Documentaries About Strong Women	Placed	
Stylist	7 captivating celebrity documentaries available to stream now	Placed	
Tom's Guide	The Best Movies of 2020	Placed	
Us Weekly	Year in Review: Best Movies of 2020	10	
Yen	List of 20 amazing celebrity documentaries to watch	2	

== Impact ==
The premiere of Miss Americana at the opening night of the 2020 Sundance Film Festival and Swift's pre-announced appearance at the festival caused a surge in the number of attendees, traction and media coverage of the event. TechCrunch's Matthew Panzarino stated that, "in nearly a decade of attending Sundance, I've never seen a scene like the premiere of Miss Americana", and added that the "crowd before letting into the theater was huge", with rumors about how "there wouldn't be room for ticketed attendees". Upon release, the film became the highest-rated Netflix-original biographical documentary by an artist in IMDb history.

=== Mental health discourse ===
Miss Americana fueled several conversations about eating disorders, body dysmorphia, exercise anorexia, self-esteem, toxic internet culture and sexual assault across the internet. Writing for The Washington Post, Jessica Gold, professor of psychiatry at the Washington University in St. Louis, stated that Swift "struck a powerful chord with viewers" with Miss Americana, "thanks to her honesty regarding her struggle for approval as a woman in today's society". Gold called Swift "the leader we need in 2020", who steps up to "fill gaps left by political leadership", during a time "when our political leaders are struggling to build consensus on and convey the gravity of issues" like mental health. She explained that Swift's leadership is commercially savvy, but also shows how celebrities "can now speak directly to fans, doing tremendous good in the process", and concluded that the singer is sending a powerful message—"one that is likely to save lives in myriad ways".

I remember how, when I was 18, that was the first time I was on the cover of a magazine, and the headline was like "Pregnant at 18?". And it was because I had worn something that made my lower stomach look not flat. So I just registered that as a punishment. And then I'd walk into a photo shoot and be in the dressing room and somebody who worked at a magazine would say, "Oh, wow, this is so amazing that you can fit into the sample sizes. Usually we have to make alterations to the dresses, but we can take them right off the runway and put them on you!" And I looked at that as a pat on the head. You register that enough times, and you just start to accommodate everything towards praise and punishment, including your own body.

— Swift talking about her body dysmorphia in Miss Americana, BBC

Kelly Douglas of The Mighty opined that Swift's "powerful candor" about her eating disorders and body dysmorphia will "not only resonate with others facing similar struggles, but could also encourage others to seek help for their eating disorder behaviors". The New York Post's Elana Fishman confessed: "every so often, I'll still catch myself criticizing the way my tummy or legs look in a photo or how a certain pair of pants fits me. From now on, whenever that happens, I'll be repeating a line Swift says in the film—We do not do that anymore, because it's better to think you look fat than to look sick". Anne Petersen of BuzzFeed News commented that Swift contributes to society's "collective understanding of what beauty and success looks like", and that she is also talking about her "susceptibility to the pressure of that understanding". Petersen added that Swift refuses "to hide, and thus continue to normalize, the behaviors that perpetuate it".

The Daily Targum stated that, despite being an expert when it comes to handling negative comments, even Swift "succumbed to insecurities that blossomed into eating problems, which shows how even the strongest among us are susceptible to potential eating disorders due to the toxic environment of social media". Ellen Ricks of HelloGiggles called Swift's reveal of her disorder as inspirational, noting "how it can potentially impact so many people still fighting", as "there is still so much stigma and misinformation" surrounding eating disorders, and praised Swift for "using her voice to shed light on the issue for her fans". In a Deccan Chronicle piece titled "Warring with food", writer Swati Sharma noted "it's no surprise" that many celebrities like Swift have struggled with eating disorders, and highlighted how the singer would be "so hungry after performances that she'd feel weak and on the verge of passing out".

In an interview with Glamour, Wilson talked about the positive comments she received regarding her decision to include Swift's eating disorder and body image issues in the film:

It's been such a positive reaction. People are connecting to it in a really deep way, which was, of course, my dream when making the movie. I think to see Taylor, someone who's an icon of beauty, voicing these thoughts that so many people have had is incredibly, incredibly powerful because it's not something you would expect to hear. God, I almost tear up like thinking about some of the notes I've gotten from teenagers about how they look in the mirror and they hate their body and they hate the way they look. But now that they've seen that Taylor has struggled with some of these same things too, and she's gotten through it and she's stronger and happier as a result, and that inspires them to keep going. It's just so moving.

— Lana Wilson on the overwhelming positive comments she received, Glamour

In an article titled "Why women say sorry too much and what to say — and do — instead" for Australian Broadcasting Corporation, writer Kate Midena highlighted the moment from Miss Americana when Swift speaks about her struggle to "deprogram the misogyny in [her] own brain." In the scene, Swift says: "I'm trying to be as educated as possible in how to respect people. Like, there is no such thing as a slut, there is no such thing as a bitch, there is no such thing as someone who's bossy, there's just a boss. We don't want to be condemned for being multi-faceted." Swift then pauses and quickly apologizes saying "Sorry, that was a real soap box," before correcting herself again saying "Why did I say sorry? Ugh!". Director Wilson can be heard off-camera, remarking: "It's because we're trained to say sorry." Midena wrote the scene makes Swift "instantly relatable", but also raises the question "if [Swift], with all her success and during a documentary about herself, apologizes for sharing her opinion, how should the rest of us fare?" and stated "it's a conundrum women have been stuck in since the middle ages". She said girls are often taught to value empathy over "masculine traits" such as strength and assertiveness, and hence they "feel the need to cushion their actions with an apology". Midena underscored how the "female language" is filled with qualifiers such as "I'm sorry, do you mind moving?" and "Sorry, I just have one more question", and how a phrase like "Sorry for complaining", such as Swift's, could be replaced with "Thanks for listening" instead.

=== Apologies ===
Miss Americana further prompted many of Swift's past critics to respond to the documentary. American comedian Nikki Glaser wrote an apology on Instagram after her comments about Swift being "too skinny" were featured in the film. In the apology, Glaser stated that: "Unfortunately, I am featured in her [Swift's] new documentary as part of a montage of asshats saying mean things about her, which is used to explain why she felt the need to escape from the spotlight for a year", and admitted that her comments may have come from a place of "projection". She further added that "if you're familiar with my 'work' at all, you know I talk openly about battling some kind of eating disorder for the past 17 years, I was probably 'feeling fat' that day and was jealous". Swift responded: "One of the major themes of the doc is that we have the ability to change our opinions over time, to grow, to learn about ourselves. I'm so sorry to hear that you've struggled with some of the same things I've struggled with. Sending a massive hug".

American writer Jenny Johnson also posted a lengthy apology on Instagram, writing that her comments about Swift being "annoying" were unnecessary, rude, and "made in jest", stating: "please know I'm not against you, I'm with you and I apologize." Journalist Kristen S. Hé took to Twitter to apologize to Swift for an article she wrote in 2016, titled "Taylor Swift Isn't Like Other Celebrities, She's Worse". She explained that the article was intended to "deconstruct the pettiness of the celebrity–industrial complex" and expressed her regret that the headline appeared to be "overly critical" of Swift. She concluded that she has "learned so much from Taylor's artistry over the years, and remain[s] a huge fan".

=== In popular culture ===
An alternative poster of the film, featuring a male alter-ego of Swift, appears in the music video for Swift's 2020 single "The Man". The camera pans over a "Mr. Americana" poster starring "Tyler Swift", directed by "Larry Wilson", and premiering at the 2020 "Mandance Festival", a wordplay on the Sundance Festival.

A Prospect piece titled "It's time to face the facts—our male pop stars need to try a bit harder" pointed out how Miss Americana talks about the requirement for female popstars to be "highly visual, and to change that visual often", quoting Swift from the documentary: "the female artists I know of have to remake themselves 20 times more than the male artists, or else you're out of a job". As per Vox, the songwriting footages in Miss Americana shaped the image of Swift's musicianship in the following years, from being viewed as a mere popstar to an expert singer-songwriter, further bolstered by her 2020 albums Folklore and Evermore. In the journal Contemporary Music Review, Gina Arnold wrote that Miss Americana depicts Swift's distaste for "her thralldom to a conservative ideology", and helps viewers to reflect on "serious changes" regarding gender in the U.S. and the ways those changes manifest in live performances and popular culture. IndieWire credited Miss Americana for paving a way for singers to utilize major streaming platforms to eventize tour footages into intimate, candid films, to complement their careers. Critics found Miss Americana as a heavy inspiration for Canadian singer Shawn Mendes' 2020 Netflix documentary, Shawn Mendes: In Wonder. Excuse Me, I Love You (2020) by American singer Ariana Grande was also compared to Miss Americana.

American singer Katy Perry praised the film, stating that she was impressed by Miss Americana because of its self-awareness and vulnerability, commenting that she was "really excited for her [Swift] to be able to show that to the world: that things aren't perfect, they don't have to be, and it's more beautiful when they aren't". Perry further added that Miss Americana inspires her to make her own documentary.

The Department of English of the Queen's University at Kingston, a public university in Ontario, Canada, offers a fall semester course titled "Taylor Swift's Literary Legacy (Taylor's Version)", with a syllabus requiring students to analyse many of Swift's works, including watching Miss Americana; the course objective is to examine Swift's music, its literary references, and her sociopolitical impact on contemporary culture.

=== Politics ===
==== Criticism of Marsha Blackburn ====
In Miss Americana, Swift criticized Marsha Blackburn, a Republican senator from Tennessee, for her policies and voting record at the U.S. Congress. Swift called Blackburn "Trump in a wig" who won the 2018 U.S. Senate elections by "being a female applying to the kind of female males want us to be in a horrendous 1950s world."

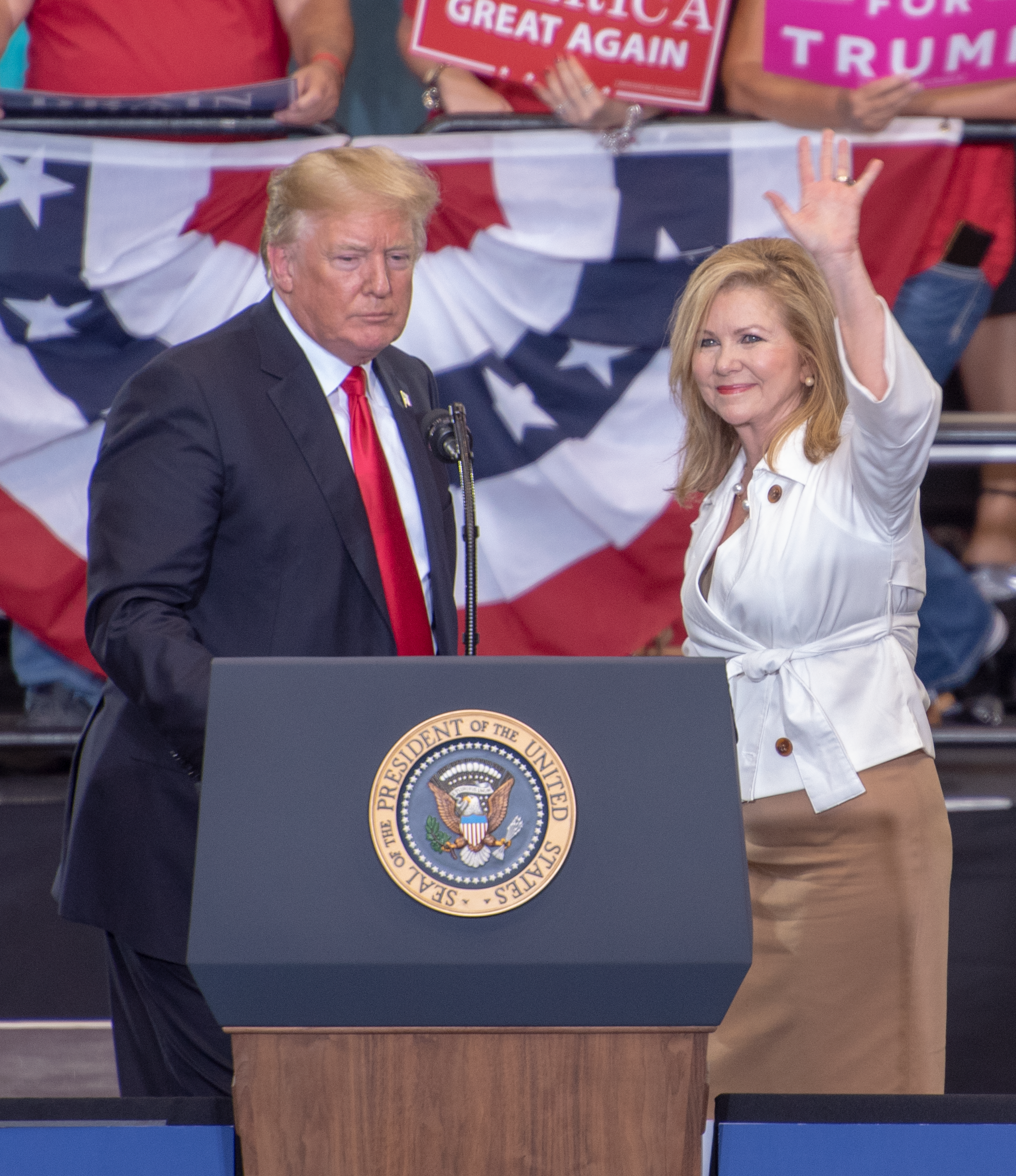
Marsha Blackburn (right) and Donald Trump (left) at a Nashville rally in 2018

It's really basic human rights, and it's right and wrong at this point, and I can't see another commercial and see [Marsha Blackburn] disguising these policies behind the words "Tennessee Christian values". Those aren't Tennessee Christian values. I live in Tennessee. I'm a Christian. That's not what we stand for. [...] She gets to be the first female senator in Tennessee, and she's Trump in a wig. She represents no female interests. She won by being a female applying to the kind of female males want us to be in a horrendous 1950s world.

— Swift criticizing Marsha Blackburn's policies on LGBT and women's rights in Miss Americana.

Blackburn responded to Swift's comments in her July 2021 interview to the American far-right website Breitbart News, claiming that the "Marxist socialist" society "liberals are pushing for" in the U.S., would be detrimental to the music industry. Blackburn mentioned that Swift "came after" her during her campaign for the 2018 mid-term elections, referring to Swift's widely discussed Instagram post on November 18, 2018, which was also portrayed in the film. In the post, Swift endorsed the Democratic candidates Phil Bredesen for the U.S. Senate, and Jim Cooper for the U.S. House, and opposed Blackburn, saying "[Blackburn's] voting record in Congress appalls and terrifies me. She voted against equal pay for women. She voted against the reauthorization of the Violence Against Women Act, which attempts to protect women from domestic violence, stalking, and date rape. She believes businesses have a right to refuse service to gay couples. She also believes they should not have the right to marry. These are not MY Tennessee values." Blackburn added that Swift "would be the first victim of that because when you look at Marxist socialistic societies, they do not allow women to dress or sing or be on stage or to entertain or the type of music she would have. They don't allow protection of private intellectual property rights" and the singer "is going to be the first ones who will be cut off because the state would have to approve your music." American legal journalist Benjamin Wittes, a senior fellow at Brookings Institution, stated he is willing to facilitate a webcast debate between Swift and Blackburn. Some others suggested that Swift should run against Blackburn in the next elections.

==== Biden/Harris campaign ====
"Only the Young", the film's promotional single, was used in advertising campaigns for Democratic presidential candidate Joe Biden and vice presidential candidate Kamala Harris in the leadup to the 2020 U.S. presidential election. Representative Eric Swalwell revealed that Swift authorized the usage of the song for the campaign free-of-cost, marking the first time she has allowed her music to be used in a political advertisement.

The video advertisement was released on October 30, 2020. It opens with a quote from vice presidential candidate, Kamala Harris, wondering why "so many powerful people are making it so difficult to vote". The rest of the advertisement features a montage of scenes from the past four years in the U.S: videos of Me Too and Black Lives Matter protesters, president Donald Trump removing his face mask following COVID-19 hospitalization, judge Amy Coney Barrett being sworn in as a Supreme Court justice, a 75-year-old protester being pushed to the ground by police in Buffalo, New York, and a scene of young supporters of Biden organizing and taking part in early voting. The video concludes with the motto: "You've marched for four years. Now it's time to run". Harris expressed gratitude to Swift, and tweeted that the singer is showing the young voters "what's at stake" in the election.

== See also ==
- List of Netflix original films
