= Miss Americana & the Heartbreak Prince =

2019 song by Taylor Swift

Song by Taylor Swift

from the album Lover
- Released: August 23, 2019
- Studio: Golden Age (Los Angeles); Golden Age West (Auckland)
- Genre: Synth-pop
- Length: 3:53
- Label: Republic
- Songwriters: Taylor Swift; Joel Little
- Producers: Taylor Swift; Joel Little

Audio video
- "Miss Americana & the Heartbreak Prince" on YouTube

"Miss Americana & the Heartbreak Prince" is a song by the American singer-songwriter Taylor Swift from her seventh studio album, Lover (2019). She wrote and produced the song with Joel Little, a few months after the 2018 U.S. midterm elections to capture her disillusionment with the American political climate under the first Trump presidency.

"Miss Americana & the Heartbreak Prince" is a synth-pop track instrumented by marching band–styled percussion and background cheerleading shouts. A protest song, its lyrics use high-school imagery as a metaphor to describe the struggles of navigating a flawed system. The refrain alludes to a troubled love story between the titular characters amidst the chaos. Many critics have regarded the song as Swift's first explicit social commentary. Most reviews were fond of the lyricism as poetic and meaningful; a few initial reviews were unimpressed but have retrospectively appreciated the political message.

"Miss Americana & the Heartbreak Prince" charted in Australia, Canada, Portugal, Scotland, Singapore, and the United States. It has received certifications in Australia, Brazil, New Zealand, and the United Kingdom. Swift performed a portion the song as the opening number to the Eras Tour (2023–2024). The song is the namesake to Swift's 2020 documentary film, Miss Americana, and turned "Miss Americana" into a sobriquet for her.

== Background and production ==
Taylor Swift's seventh studio album, Lover, was released through Republic Records on August 23, 2019; it was her first album after she ended her 12-year contract with Big Machine Records. Recorded after Swift finished her Reputation Stadium Tour in November 2018, Lover was inspired by her recalibrated personal life after the controversies leading up to her sixth studio album, Reputation (2017). (Note: Most notably, Swift's dispute with the rapper Kanye West and the media personality Kim Kardashian in summer 2016, after West released the single "Famous", led to an internet cancel movement denouncing her as a "snake".) The love she received from fans despite her tarnished "America's Sweetheart" reputation in the press, which "[assigned] humanity to her life", inspired her to embrace positivity and vulnerability. Lover predominantly consists of open-hearted love songs celebrating the ups and downs of love and represents her mature understanding of a sustainable relationship, with a bright and atmospheric sound incorporating 1980s-influenced pop rock and electropop.

A few Lover songs reflected Swift's evolved perception of contemporary American politics. She had been warned against getting involved in politics by her record label since she started out as a country music singer in 2006, (Note: Swift contended this was a consequence of the Dixie Chicks controversy in 2003, when the Dixie Chicks was ostracized by the country music audience after publicly criticizing President George W. Bush.) and did not publicly endorse any candidate for the 2016 U.S. presidential election. After witnessing the political events affecting the rights of certain people, (Note: Among the events that influenced Swift's political outlook included a sexual assault trial that she won in 2017, the MeToo movement, the restrictions on LGBT rights, the rise of American nationalism, and white privilege.) she became disillusioned with the contemporary American political climate and decided to abandon her previous apolitical stance. In the 2018 U.S. midterm elections, she endorsed Democratic candidates for her home state of Tennessee—her first time publicly voicing her political opinion. The most explicitly political song on the album is "Miss Americana & the Heartbreak Prince", which she wrote a few months after the midterm elections. Swift wrote and produced the track with New Zealand producer Joel Little, who recorded it at Golden Age Studio in Los Angeles and Golden Age West Studio in Auckland. The song was mixed by Serban Ghenea, assisted by John Hanes, at MixStar Studios in Virginia Beach.

== Music and lyrical interpretation ==
"Miss Americana" is an atmospheric, gloomy synth-pop song. It features a slow-burning production with a refrain backed by marching band-styled percussion, dreamy synthesizers, and syncopated piano tunes. Reflecting Swift's political disillusionment, "Miss Americana & the Heartbreak Prince" is a protest song that uses high-school imagery to critique the contemporary American political climate; it likens the political scene to a high-school setting. Rolling Stone's Nick Catucci described the narrative as a parable. In the September 2019 cover issue for Rolling Stone, Swift said she thought high school was an appropriate metaphor because she found the social events of a traditional American high school could alienate certain people, similar to "our political landscape ... like we need to huddle up under the bleachers and figure out a plan to make things better".

In the melancholic, ambient opening, Swift sings about her disenchantment, imagining herself with her "pageant smile" on a homecoming: "American glory faded before me/ Now I'm feeling hopeless, ripped up my prom dress/ Running through rose thorns, I saw the scoreboard/ And ran for my life." As the song progresses, she sings about how depressed she is witnessing "my team is losing/ Battered and bruising/ I see the high fives/ Between the bad guys." The refrain is more upbeat and alludes to a troubled love story, with Swift singing "It's you and me, there's nothing like this / Miss Americana and the Heartbreak Prince/ We're so sad, we paint the town blue/ Voted most likely to run away with you". In the bridge, the lyrics do not follow a rhyme scheme as with the previous sections, and Swift sings over cheerleading shouts, "Go! Fight! Win!"; the narrator is initially reluctant to fight but has changed her mind by the end, embracing tenacity and determination: "And I'll never let you go, 'cause I know this is a fight/ That someday we're gonna win."

According to some music critics, compared to the bright-eyed high-school imagery on Swift's earlier songs about teenage experiences like "Love Story" (2008) or "You Belong with Me" (2008), the high school in "Miss Americana & the Heartbreak Prince" is darker and represents the parallel between the flawed high school and the flawed political system. In Variety, Chris Willman wrote that the line "The damsels are depressed" depicts how women are at a disadvantage in this political climate, and the line "They whisper in the hallway, 'She's a bad, bad girl'" alludes to Swift's hesitation to endorse Hillary Clinton in the 2016 presidential election for fears of being seen as "another Hillary-loving Hollywood witch". (Note: Swift also said one of the reasons she remained silent on public matters was that she needed to protect her mental health after her dispute with West.) The troubled love story, in the views of Alexis Petridis from The Guardian, was similar to Bruce Springsteen's songwriting tropes; it reflects not only Swift's familiar trope of two young lovers vowing to leave their small town together, but also the political climate under the presidency of Donald Trump. As noted by Lindsay Zoladz from The New York Times, the track also refers to sexual violence through the lyric, "Boys will be boys then, where are the wise men?"

== Release and commercial performance ==
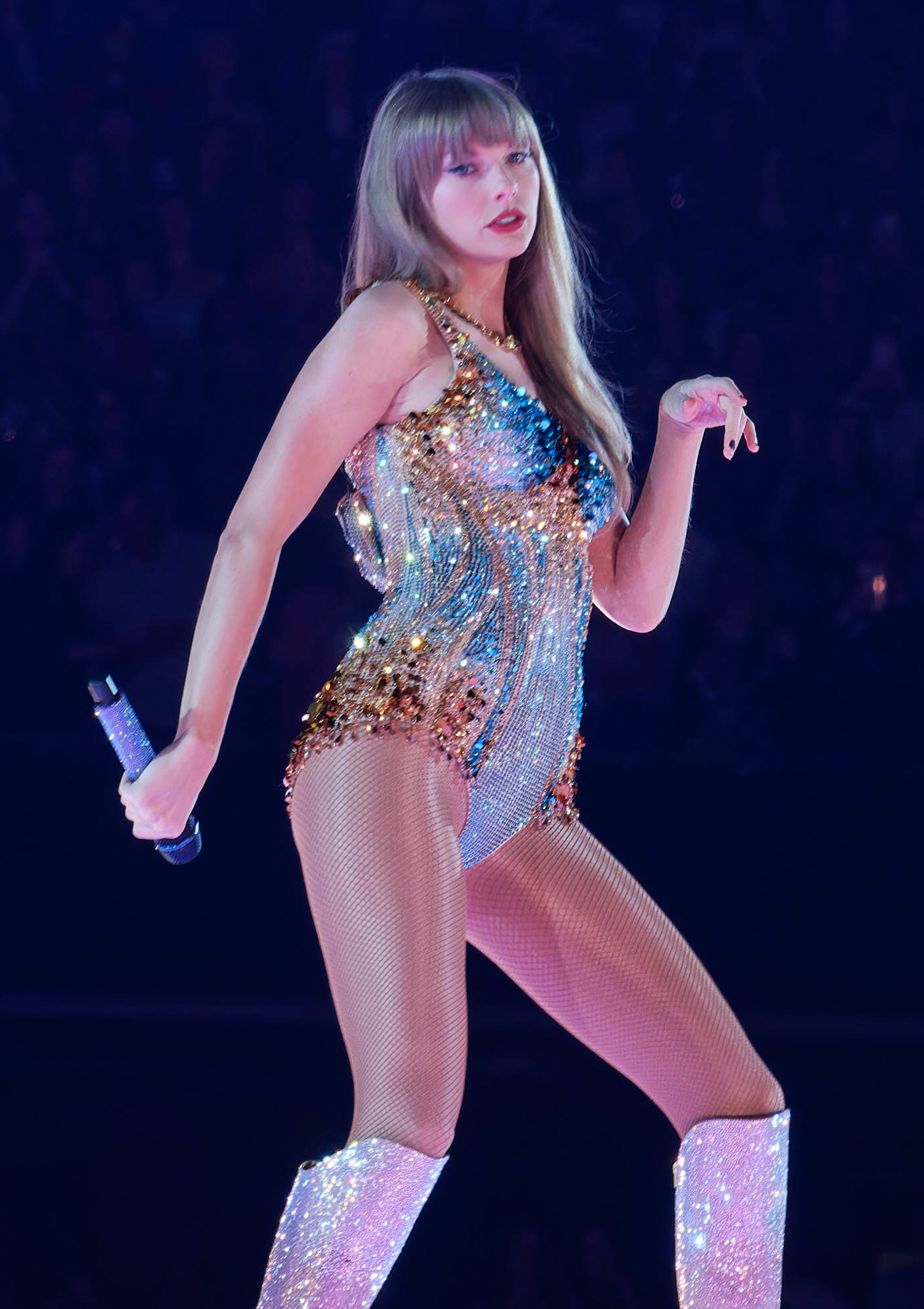
Swift on the Eras Tour (2023), where she included "Miss Americana & the Heartbreak Prince" as the opening number

Upon the release of its parent album, "Miss Americana & the Heartbreak Prince" debuted and peaked at number 49 on the US Billboard Hot 100, simultaneously charting with the other seventeen tracks of Lover. It also entered the Rolling Stone Top 100 at number 16. Elsewhere, the song reached the singles charts of Singapore (19), Canada (47), and Scotland (92). In Australia, it peaked at number 32 on the ARIA Singles Chart and was certified double platinum by the Australian Recording Industry Association (ARIA). In the United Kingdom, the track reached number 63 on the OCC's Audio Streaming Chart and received a gold certification from the British Phonographic Industry (BPI). A shortened version of "Miss Americana and the Heartbreak Prince" was the opening number to the set list of Swift's sixth concert tour, the Eras Tour (2023–2024).

== Reception and commentary ==
In Lover album reviews, critics praised the lyrics of "Miss Americana & the Heartbreak Prince". Some were impressed by Swift's effort in creating a political song, with Alexis Petridis from The Guardian lauding the track as being superior to other pop stars' "woke" attempts. Time's Dana Schwartz remarked that the song contains some of Swift's most poetic lyricism and the Los Angeles Times critic Mikael Wood selected it as one of the album tracks that demonstrated her emotional maturity. Ben Rayner of the Toronto Star lauded the song as a "lyrical tour de force" that has a "wickedly sharp" play on the American high-school imagery. On a less positive side, Anna Gaca of Pitchfork complained that the production, which she compared to the music of Lana Del Rey, was unoriginal. A few critics were unimpressed with Swift's political motivation.

"Miss Americana and the Heartbreak Prince" received extensive commentary on its own. Will Gottsegen from Spin considered "Miss Americana & the Heartbreak Prince" to be a song that encapsulates both the cheerful, bright tones of Swift's releases in her early career, and the dark tones on Lover's preceding studio album Reputation (2017). Gottsegen wrote that the song exemplifies the "ecstatic and free" attitude of Lover overall, but is still affected by the media drama surrounding Swift's personal life around the Reputation era, praising it as the album's highlight for being a "conceptual evolution, and a love story for increasingly precarious times." In an op-ed for Teen Vogue, Claire Dodson wrote that "Miss Americana & the Heartbreak Prince" successfully captures the disappointment at American politics, and likened the song's theme to the content of Euphoria, a contemporaneous drama series dealing with issues in contemporary America such as body insecurity, transphobia, and drug addiction. Writing for Variety, Chris William felt that "Miss Americana & the Heartbreak Prince" would be a great "protest song" because, in his opinion, the song effectively conveys Swift's deep sorrow and disappointment towards American politics, which is rare among other protest songs where "anger feels like a lifetime condition, not something that's been arrived at as the culmination of a long character arc." William added that "songs about the United States as a creeping dystopia tend not to be very interesting, or listenable; a song about the U.S. of 2019 as a homecoming-game horror movie is something else".

Slant Magazine named it the nineteenth-best track of 2019. In a 2022 retrospective, The New York Times critic Lindsay Zoladz felt the high-school imagery of "Miss Americana & the Heartbreak Prince" might undermine adult listeners on a superficial listen, but asserted the song has a "dark vision" that addresses cruelty, depression, and sexual violence ("Boys will be boys then, where are the wise men?") under a high-school camouflage, and addresses those topics more directly than any of the songs Swift wrote as a teenager. Zoladz added that the song's title "alludes to a larger world outside the high school walls, and the greater systemic forces that keep such patterns repeating well into adulthood." Billboard's Jason Lipshutz, who ranked "Miss Americana & the Heartbreak Prince" 16th out of the 18 Lover tracks upon its 2019 release, reappraised the song in a 2024 article: considering its cultural impact, "'Miss Americana' now stands as one of its biggest sonic and conceptual successes".

== Miss Americana ==
"Miss Americana & the Heartbreak Prince" inspired the title of Swift's 2020 Netflix documentary, Miss Americana, directed by Lana Wilson, that follows Swift's life and career over several years. The song was used in the documentary's trailer.

== Credits and personnel ==
- Taylor Swift – vocals, songwriting, production
- Joel Little – production, songwriting, drum programming, keyboards, recording engineer
- John Hanes – mix engineering
- Serban Ghenea – mixing

== Charts ==
2019 chart performance for "Miss Americana & the Heartbreak Prince"
Chart (2019)	Peak position
Australia (ARIA)	32
Canada Hot 100 (Billboard)	47
Scottish Singles Sales (Official Charts)	92
Singapore (RIAS)	19
UK Audio Streaming (Official Charts)	63
US Billboard Hot 100	49
US Rolling Stone Top 100	16

2024 chart performance for "Miss Americana & the Heartbreak Prince"
Chart (2024)	Peak position
Portugal (AFP)	154
Singapore (RIAS)	11
Sweden Heatseeker (Sverigetopplistan)	7

== Certifications ==
Certifications
Region	Certification	Certified units/sales
Australia (ARIA)	2× Platinum	140,000^{‡}
Brazil (Pro-Música Brasil)	Platinum	40,000^{‡}
New Zealand (RMNZ)	Platinum	30,000^{‡}
United Kingdom (BPI)	Gold	400,000^{‡}
^{‡} Sales+streaming figures based on certification alone.
