= Public image of Taylor Swift =

Popular perceptions of American singer-songwriter

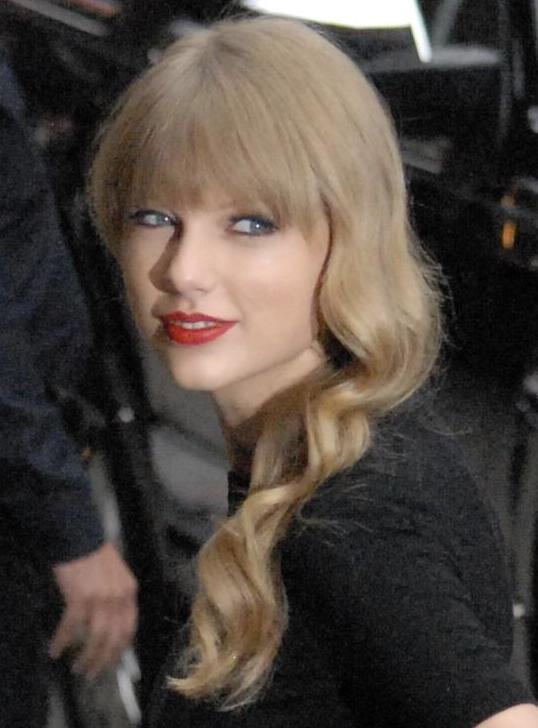
Taylor Swift outside the Late Show with David Letterman studio in 2012

The American singer-songwriter Taylor Swift is a topic of extensive mass media interest and press coverage. With a scrutinized life and career that elicit diverse public opinion, Swift is both widely admired and criticized in the mainstream media. Authors have examined her high social approval as well as her tendency toward controversy. She has been variously described as a savvy businesswoman, feminist, political influencer, capitalist, style icon, it girl, millennial role model, philosopher, and historical figure. Her estimated earned media value was US$130 billion as of 2023. (Note: Not to be confused with net worth. As of 2025, Swift's net worth is US$1.6 billion. Earned media value of an individual is the net profits generated in an industry by harnessing the name and brand of the individual without royalties or any payment to the individual.)

Swift is a ubiquitous but polarizing cultural figure whose public image is defined by the complex relationship between her, her vast fandom, detractors, and the media. In her early career as a country singer in the late 2000s, Swift was referred to as "America's Sweetheart" because of her girl-next-door image. Her dating life became a topic of rampant tabloid speculation in the early 2010s, even though she had been reluctant to discuss it openly. American public relations executive Tree Paine became Swift's publicist in 2014.

By the 2020s, the general public showed heightened interest in content about Swift, which proved financially lucrative for news outlets that hyperfocused on her, leading to a media feedback loop that resulted in consumer "fatigue" with Swift's "overexposure". Coverage of her disputes, such as with Kanye West, Katy Perry and Kim Kardashian, and breakups with romantic partners like John Mayer, Jake Gyllenhaal, Harry Styles, Tom Hiddleston and Matty Healy, affected Swift's public image negatively; she has been a target of misogyny and perceived double standards, including slut-shaming and body shaming remarks. The negative responses inspired a significant portion of Swift's music, (Note: Examples include songs such as "Mean" (2011), "Shake It Off" and "Blank Space" (2014), "I Did Something Bad" (2017), "You Need to Calm Down" (2019), "The Man" and "The Last Great American Dynasty" (2020), "Nothing New" (2021), "Lavender Haze" (2022), "Castles Crumbling" and "Slut!" (2023), "Who's Afraid of Little Old Me? and "Clara Bow" (2024), and "Cancelled! (2025).) such as her sixth studio album, Reputation (2017). The Guardian opined that Swift has become "immune to hate", citing her unabating commercial success.

Authors have commended Swift's philanthropic efforts, activism for artists' rights, closeness with fans, and impact on popular culture and the music industry. Swift is also known for her rapport in interviews, enthusiastic persona, and embracing the cat lady archetype. One of the first celebrities established in the age of social media, Swift is cited by critics as a celebrity–industrial complex example, with various organizations leveraging her in their promotional strategies. Her relationship with American football player Travis Kelce has had significant cultural impact and contributed $331.5 million in brand value for the National Football League (NFL) in 2023. They married on July 3, 2026, in a private but highly publicized wedding.

On the other hand, Swift's privacy and safety has been a concern as she is often mobbed at her residences and leaked real-time locations, including numerous incidents of armed stalkers and trespassers. Her cybersecurity threats include scalping of her ticket sales, cybersquatting, and deepfake reproductions of her likeness. Swift has obtained restraining orders against numerous individuals and won lawsuits. Her private jet usage in 2022 was criticized for its greenhouse gas emissions, though she purchased carbon credits to offset them. Her involvement in American politics is also a subject of scrutiny.

== Characterization ==
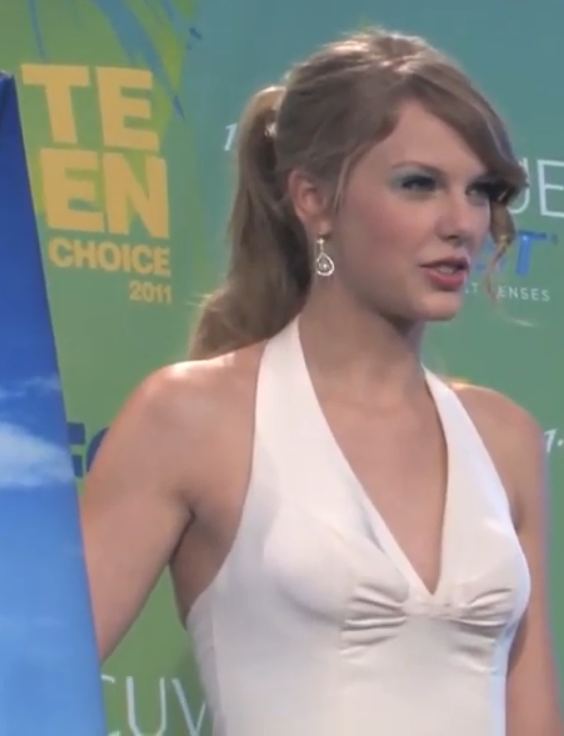
Swift at the 2011 Teen Choice Awards; she was considered a teen idol in her early career.

The life and career of American singer-songwriter Taylor Swift are recurrent topics in global media and celebrity culture. A dominant cultural figure, Swift has a ubiquitous presence in popular culture, and is often referred to as a pop icon; i-D notes her immense popularity and longevity as the kind of fame unwitnessed since the 20th century. The Economist opined that Swift "has a strong claim to being the most popular entertainer of the 21st century—and perhaps of all time". Critical commentary often refers to Swift as an uncommon, monocultural entity, or more often "the most famous person on the planet".

Taylor Swift is the Titan submersible implosion of music journalism—or a series of them, or one endless sustained ultrabuzz spectacle—driving a rapturous surge of media coverage by churning out so much material. It's an increasingly rare kind of cultural domination—even at the height of the Beatles or Michael Jackson, there was always a pantheon of other deities. Swift has a monopoly on monoculture, she's the Elon Musk super-entrepreneur of music.

— Kieran Press-Reynolds on Swift, Pitchfork

According to journalists, Swift's public image is a combination of her perceived reputations as a consistent artist, an astute entrepreneur and a famous media personality. Joe Coscarelli of The New York Times wrote, Swift is "a mix of prolific artistic output and relentless business savvy, plus cultural dominance as a celebrity". In the words of music critics Sam Sanders and Ann Powers, Swift is a "surprisingly successful composite of megawatt pop star and bedroom singer-songwriter." Coscarelli made a similar point, saying that Swift's career "seems to bridge the gap between two kinds of artists ... the sustained, hit-making entertainers who may be overlooked, at least at first, as musicians, and the serious singer-songwriters who tend to be more critically lauded." Dorian Lynskey of The Guardian opined that "Swift manages to be both authentic singer-songwriter and unabashed hyper-capitalist." Media outlets often describe Swift as a savvy businesswoman, who is also known for her philanthropic initiatives and "generous" donations.

=== Perception up-close ===
"I've never seen any woman handle herself the way she does. She makes my eyes water, the way she handles herself. She manages the whole fame trip, what it means to be in the spotlight. So when you think about all the things going wrong the world she is the true great role model."

— Oprah Winfrey on Swift, Herald Sun (2015)

In late 2000s, the media labelled Swift in her early career as "America's Sweetheart" for her likability and girl-next-door image; Rolling Stone's Gavin Edwards called her "2008's Country Lolita". Reporter Vannessa Grigoriadis profiled Swift in 2009 after spending time with her and dubbed her a giggly and dorky "Little Miss Perfect" and "the goodiest goody-goody in the nation" with a politesse but also someone who worries about coming off as "offensive". Kellie Pickler described Swift as a hard-working, competitive girl. Over the next few years, Swift earned a reputation for her enthusiasm at award shows.

Journalists have written about her polite and "open" personality, calling her a "media darling" and "a reporter's dream". British Vogue described her presence as charming, knowing "how to work a room". Swift's peers have complimented her social comportment. Tom Cruise referred to her as a genius with a "great sense of humor" and Ryan Reynolds praised her quick wit, saying she is one of the funniest people he has ever met, whereas Jennifer Lawrence dubbed her a well-spoken, "badass bitch" in her career. Stephen Colbert admired Swift's "queen"-like warm persona and interpersonal communication in social settings. Dolly Parton called Swift a "good girl" that everyone "can feel good about loving".

Swift is a subject of incessant scrutiny in the press. The New York Times asserted in 2013 that her "dating history has begun to stir what feels like the beginning of a backlash" and questioned whether she was in the midst of a "quarter-life crisis". Swift has been reluctant to publicly discuss her personal life, calling it "a career weakness". Her detractors accused her of being "calculated" and manipulative of her image, a narrative bolstered by a 2016 dispute with American rapper Kanye West. Cultural critics have highlighted that Swift's life and career have been subject to intense misogyny and slut-shaming. Nevertheless, between 2019 and 2021, YouGov surveys ranked her as the world's most admired female musician.

Having embraced the cat lady archetype, Swift owns three cats: Meredith Grey, Olivia Benson, and Benjamin Button. They have been featured or referenced in her videos and other works. Swift is also a known triskaidekaphile, using the number 13 in various works.

== Media coverage ==
Crafts, capitalism, conspiracies, cultural norms, the climate crisis; football, family relations, fine dining; Argylle, AI, asbestos, academia and museums; the US election, Senate hearings, international relations and the International Date Line; romance, sexuality and the right way to be successful; gun crime, Grammys and grammar: in just the first two months of 2024, The Guardian's reporting on Taylor Swift has spilled far beyond her natural home in the music section, reflecting a reach that exceeds the pop superstar's unstoppable ambitions.

— Laura Snapes on Swift's sphere of influence in the media, The Guardian

In the mass media, Deadline Hollywood dubbed Swift "the Monarch of All Media". Critic Kitty Empire dubbed Swift a "post-media" celebrity who does not need the favor of the media to sustain a career. Kieran Press-Reynolds of Pitchfork called her an "execessively documented" person.

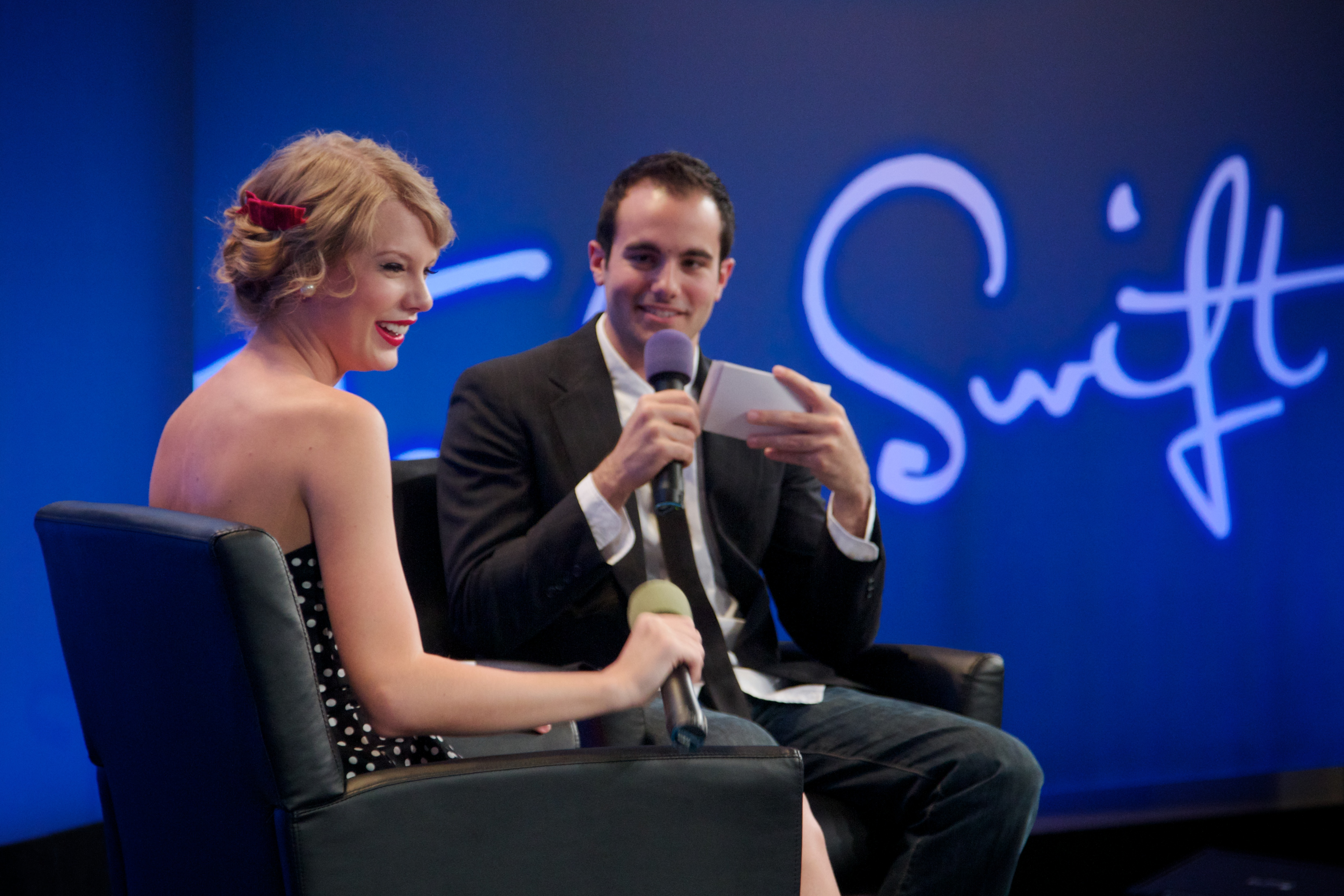
Swift interviewed by YouTube executive Kevin Allocca in 2011

Shows and television programs featuring her often attain viewership peaks; for instance, Swift's presence at a number of National Football League (NFL) games broke a series of viewership, ticket and merchandise sales records for the league, network and television, referred to as the "Taylor Swift effect". USA Today journalist Louie Villalobos remarked Swift "is saving NFL, and has helped generate $122 million to the NFL's brand value." According to Apex Marketing Group, Swift's contribution to the brand value for the National Football League and the Kansas City Chiefs is as high as $331.5 million. Swift was credited with a 20 percent increase in sponsorships for the 2023 NFL season, resulting in $2.35 billion in revenue, 15 percent more than the previous season. Viewership of NFL games increased 53 percent among teenage girls and 24 percent among persons of age 18 to 24. The episode of dance competition program Dancing With the Stars that paid tribute to Swift amassed a record 7.8 million viewers across all official platforms, making it the show's most-watched multi-platform telecast on ABC since its September 2021 premiere. The August 13, 2025, episode of the sports podcast New Heights, hosted by Jason and Travis Kelce, became the most-watched podcast episode premiere ever after Swift announced her twelfth studio album, The Life of a Showgirl (2025), in it. When Swift, who has not performed on the Country Music Association Awards since 2013, unexpectedly announced that she is returning to the program in 2026, the Walt Disney Company increased slots of the show's streaming ad inventory, which was already sold out, following sudden spike in interest.

Taylor Swift: The Little Golden Book Biography, a children's book written by Wendy Loggia and illustrated by Elisa Chavarri, is the fastest-selling print in the 81-year history of Little Golden Books, having sold a million copies in seven months. News magazine Time's 2023 Person of the Year issue featuring Swift sold 238,808 physical copies, not including newsstand sales, marking the highest-selling Time issue since the May 2011 issue that featured the royal wedding of Prince William and Catherine Middleton, which sold 232,000 copies from the website and the newsstands combined.

=== Industrial complex ===
Critics have described the relationship between Swift and the mainstream media as an example of the celebrity–industrial complex, which in turn has affected Swift's art profusely; her sixth studio album Reputation (2017), whose subject matter is fame, critiques the complex, while her autobiographical documentary Miss Americana (2020) deconstructs it. According to Entertainment Weekly's Maura Johnston, Swift's every move is inspected since she is "one of the first pop stars to have fully grown up in the era of social media's endless feedback loop with the celebrity-industrial complex".

Swift is a favorite choice of mention in the media, albeit in an attempt to attract a wide readership. Many other celebrities are asked about Swift "almost constantly". Scottie Andrew of CNN opined that "shoehorning" Swift into news stories in which she is not tangentially related "has become something of a pastime for content creators". Bond Benton, a professor in communication and media at Montclair State University, studied the phenomenon and stated that "the presence of Swift in any media content will increase visibility of that content." Benton characterized Swift as an unintentional but reliable "attention-grabber" whose internet media coverage has a "memetic" quality, inviting "fans and haters alike to debate and dissect her", elevating the engagements with an article or a video, which in turn encourages the media to include Swift in their content, even if it is an "awkward inclusion", to maximize their profits. As a side-effect, this hyperfocus on Swift "can needle consumers who feel she's oversaturating their news feeds." According to Emily Yahr of The Washington Post, anything said about Swift by a famous person is turned into a news item, "picked up by aggregated news sites to get Swift's name in a headline", and such, the news item spreads uncontrollably.

In November 2023, journalist Bryan West joined Gannett as a reporter exclusively covering Swift. In February 2024, The Guardian began a weekly newsletter, Swift Notes, dedicated to Swift-related news, and the Victoria and Albert Museum in London looked to hire "superfan advisors" ahead of the Eras Tour's European leg in 2024. The Washington Post's Meaghan Tobin and Pei-Lin Wu note that despite the strict censorship practices in China, "Swift has managed to steer clear of scrutiny ... In fact, Chinese state media seems to have nothing but praise for [her]". Her public image has been studied academically in broader contexts at various educational institutions, such as New York University and Berklee College of Music.

== Public relations ==
In her "You Need to Calm Down" music video, Swift critiqued the media for pitting female artists against each other by portraying drag queens impersonating various pop stars competing for one crown.

Swift has been a polarizing figure; according to Coscarelli, even though Swift has "studiously avoided" instances of controversy, she has been met with "extra-musical headlines". Her fame has had detrimental effects on her position in the media; some are genuine critique of her actions, while the rest constitute unverified tabloid gossip that has resulted in various moments of negative press for Swift. Shaina Weatherhead of Collider wrote that all of Swift's moves are "closely monitored and analyzed", Clash described Swift as a lightning rod for both praise and criticism, and branding expert Jeetendehr Sehdev told Fortune, "People love her or hate her". Vox journalist Alex Abad-Santos agreed, claiming "it's impossible to be neutral" about Swift, with the public opinion of her having developed two polar extremes; he described Swift as a cultural Rorschach test. Marie Claire declared Swift as "one of the most idolized and scrutinized women of her generation."

Swift has generally used negative critique as musical inspiration, writing songs such as "Shake It Off" (2014), "Look What You Made Me Do" (2017), and "You Need to Calm Down" (2019). Public relations academic Nancy Marshall wrote in Forbes that Swift's "omnipresence provides valuable lessons for the entire public relations industry." Marketing executive Stacy Jones estimated Swift's earned media value at $130 billion.

American executive Paula Erickson handled Swift's public relations (PR) from 2007 to March 2014 through her Nashville-based Erickson Public Relations. Swift, who planned to make her PR in-house, then hired Tree Paine as her exclusive publicist; Swift is Paine's first and only known client. Paine has received press coverage for guiding Swift through a number of publicized moments, such as Swift's 2016 controversy with West following the release of his single "Famous", her 2017 sexual assault trial, her choice to speak on politics for the 2018 U.S. mid-term elections, the 2019 dispute over her masters, and a 2023 series of claims about Swift by celebrity gossip social media account DeuxMoi.

=== Celebrity disputes ===
Swift's publicized disputes and alleged "feuds" have received widespread online attention and media coverage. She began experiencing media "overexposure" in 2012. Some media are noted for igniting "beef" between Swift and other celebrities, especially against other women. Swift has had "feuds" with celebrities like Katy Perry and Nicki Minaj, where Perry responded after Swift accused an unnamed singer of trying to sabotage Swift's tour. Animosity alleged by media outlets also contest Swift against Cardi B, Adele, Demi Lovato, SZA, and Ariana Grande—despite the fact that Swift engaged none of them and even attempted to debunk some of the rumors—and against her former boyfriends Joe Jonas, John Mayer, Calvin Harris, and Jake Gyllenhaal. West has been a significant source of controversy in Swift's public image.

==== Kanye West ====
Kanye West taking the microphone from Swift at the 2009 MTV Video Music Awards, with Taylor Lautner and Shakira in the background.

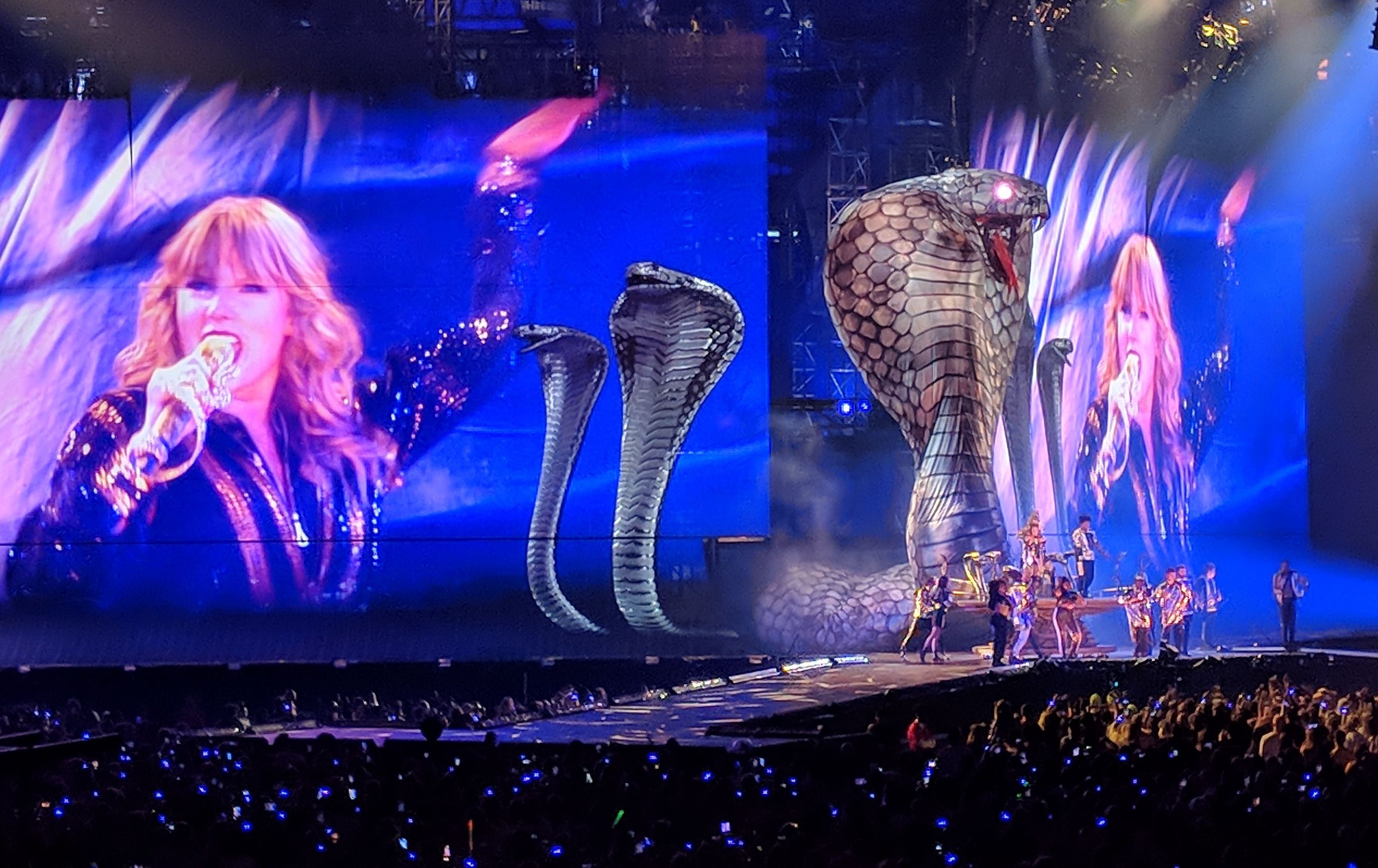
Snake, a term that was used by detractors to ridicule Swift in 2016, instigated by West's ex-wife Kim Kardashian, became the main visual motif of Swift's hip hop-imbued album Reputation (2017).

The decade-spanning feud between Swift and West mutually affected their reputations and cultural perception. In September 2009, at the 2009 MTV Video Music Awards, Swift won the MTV Video Music Award for Best Female Video for her 2009 song "You Belong with Me", becoming one of the youngest artists (age 19) to win a MTV Video Music Award. While Swift was delivering her speech, West climbed the stage, interrupted her, and took her microphone to declare "Yo, Taylor, I'm really happy for you, I'ma let you finish, but Beyoncé had one of the best videos of all time!", referring to "Single Ladies" (2008). Swift was then escorted backstage. Beyoncé later won Video of the Year that evening and invited Swift to finish her speech. West's actions were met with widespread criticism; then-U.S. President Barack Obama called West a "jackass" on television. West issued apologies and blamed his "difficult day" but subsequently recanted. Swift joked about the incident in her Saturday Night Live monologue in November 2009. Swift and West posed together in photographs from the 57th Annual Grammy Awards in 2015, and she stated that they had become friends with help from Jay-Z, a mutual friend.

The feud was re-ignited when West released his 2016 single "Famous", containing the lyrics "I feel like me and Taylor might still have sex / Why? I made that bitch famous" in reference to the 2009 incident. West claimed that Swift had approved the lyrics beforehand on a phone call, whereas she said she was not made aware of the second line describing her as a "bitch". He also released a music video for "Famous", incorporating a naked wax doll of Swift, which she dubbed "revenge porn" in 2019. After Swift "shaded" West in her speech following her Album of the Year win for 1989 at the 58th Annual Grammy Awards (2016), talking about not letting detractors take credit for her fame, West's then-wife, Kim Kardashian, released trimmed clips of the Swift–West call on Snapchat that appeared to support West's claim. "#TaylorSwiftisOverParty" became the top trend on Twitter, with viral social media posts calling Swift "fake, calculated, manipulative, a snake, a liar and is not what she seems". Various media criticized, trolled and "cancelled" Swift. The backlash caused Swift to step away from the spotlight for a year, avoiding being seen by the press until the 2017 release of Reputation, which was partially inspired by the controversy. It was not until 2020 that the full, unedited footage of the call leaked, providing further context on the situation and exonerating her in the eyes of some, resulting in "#KanyeWestisOverParty" becoming the top Twitter trend.

West continued to mention Swift in various media through the 2020s. In February 2025, he made Swift the only person he follows on Instagram. In April 2025, in a series of subsequently deleted tweets, West claimed that Styles and Justin Bieber "fucked Taylor swift from both sides" and stated "IM MAD I HAVENT FUCKED TAYLOR SWIFT … YET."

=== Fluctuations ===
BBC News called Swift–West disputes the "music's most notorious on-off feud". Vulture writer Nate Jones pinpointed that Swift's overexposure during the Red and 1989 album cycles as the reason why the media easily "turned against" her in 2016, such as an opinion piece from Vice's Grace Medford that attributed Swift's later success to her "vilifying" West. Knibbs commented that Swift was a "country music princess on the verge of superstardom" in 2009, became a "snake" in 2016, and returned as a "full-blown music juggernaut" after 2019, providing an excellent "case study for the ups and downs of modern pop stardom". Swift has attempted to avoid overexposure since 2017, and has often mocked the media in her music; she sold supplementary magazines inspired by Reputation at Target with sarcastic comments about her life mimicking gossip headlines.

According to Carter Sherman of Vice, after viewing Swift as a "villain" from 2016 to 2018, growing self-awareness in the media helped popular culture undergo a "Great Swift Revival" in 2020, healing her public image. Media outlets began praising Swift for standing her ground. Shaad D'Souza of The Guardian wrote in 2023 that Swift had become "immune to hate" and re-established herself as the world's favorite popstar. The Eras Tour (2023–2024) ushered in a period of intense fame and adoration for Swift, which was followed by waves of vitriol triggered by her relationship and wedding to Travis Kelce. Apart from a mixed critical reception, social media smear campaigns also targeted her 12th studio album, The Life of a Showgirl (2025). Cultural theorist Amelia Morris argued that the album's emphasis on Swift's desire for a traditional "settled-down" life was associated with far-right narratives and used to fuel backlash against the album. As such, Swift continued to receive extensive scrutiny well into the 2020s decade, which prompted Mary Kate Carr of The A.V. Club to conclude there is a "Taylor Swift-shaped hole" in media coverage, where journalists forgo fundamental ethics when discussing Swift. Publications like Rolling Stone and Dissent have termed the abnormal, extreme responses to Swift on the Internet as the "Taylor Swift Derangement Syndrome".

=== Privacy, stalking and jet usage ===
Swift is frequently mobbed, mostly by fans and paparazzi. She has spoken about her lack of privacy and that she is "highly aware of the fact that that is not normal." In 2015, Swift's fans swarmed the Narita International Airport in Chiba, Japan, when she landed there, causing flight delays. Swift has experienced numerous instances of house break-in and stalkers across her U.S. homes and locations; some of the stalkers have also been armed during their pursuits. Swift has received death and rape threats as well. She has won restraining orders against various individuals designated as stalkers. In 2019, she said she carries "QuikClot army grade bandage dressing" with her everywhere for gunshots or stab wounds.

Swift's private jet use has drawn scrutiny and criticism for its carbon emissions after media outlets cited a 2022 report which was compiled based on data posted by the now-defunct Twitter account @CelebJets. In response, a spokesperson for Swift stated that she had purchased more than double the required carbon credits to offset all tour travel and flights to visit Kelce. In December 2023, Swift's lawyers sent a cease and desist letter to the American programmer Jack Sweeney, the person who owned the jet-tracking accounts, alleging stalking and safety risks; media outlets have reported that the information posted by Sweeney is a synthesis of publicly available data. It was reported in 2024 that Swift sold one of the two jets she owned.

=== Conspiracy theories ===
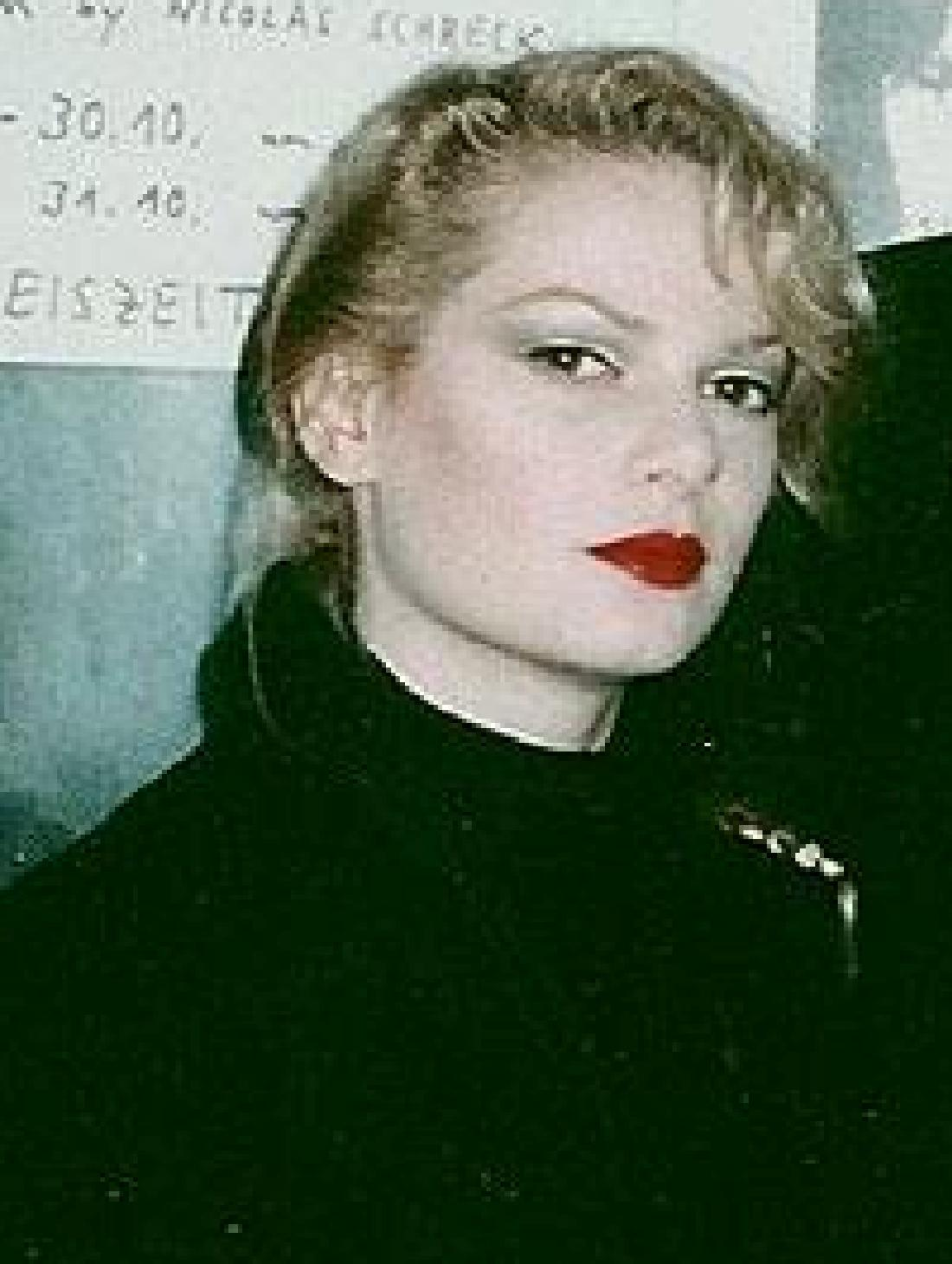
American artist Zeena LaVey, pictured in 1989

Swift has been the subject of multiple conspiracy theories. One such theory that originated online in the 2010s claims that she is a clone of the American artist and former satanist Zeena LaVey, daughter of the founder of the Church of Satan, an allegation based on Swift's apparent physical similarity to LaVey. Swift's use of Gothic elements in some of her performances has drawn accusations of witchcraft from the right wing.

A political conspiracy theory about Swift in the U.S. shared by some conservative influencers is that she is a "Pentagon psy-op" employed by the Democrat-led U.S. federal government to control public opinion. Prior to her open support of Democratic candidates in 2018, some alt-right internet users theorized that Swift was a neo-Nazi "Aryan princess" with a white supremacist agenda. However, Swift has criticized racism and white supremacy.

Social media users called Gaylors have purported claims that Swift is a closeted lesbian or bisexual, based on their interpretations of her music, lyrics and aesthetics. Journalists have largely dismissed it as a baseless, parasocial conspiracy theory, infringing on her private life. Other leftist social media users have criticized Swift for allegedly promoting "tradwife propaganda" with her twelfth studio album, The Life of a Showgirl (2025), and her relationship with the American football player Travis Kelce, citing lyrics about "settling down" and having children in the song "Wish List"; some even claimed that Swift and Kelce are MAGA. On the other hand, Republican users dubbed the couple a fabricated leftist stunt and conspiracy to rig the government and the National Football League (NFL), designed to boost voter enthusiasm and secure major political endorsement. Journalists have dismissed these online discourses of various political sections as irrational, rooted in a perceived bad faith. Behavioral intelligence platform GUDEA reported that such allegations are driven by a network of bot-like social media accounts, finding a significant overlap between these accounts with those that attacked Swift's friend Blake Lively amidst her litigation against Justin Baldoni.

== Womanhood ==
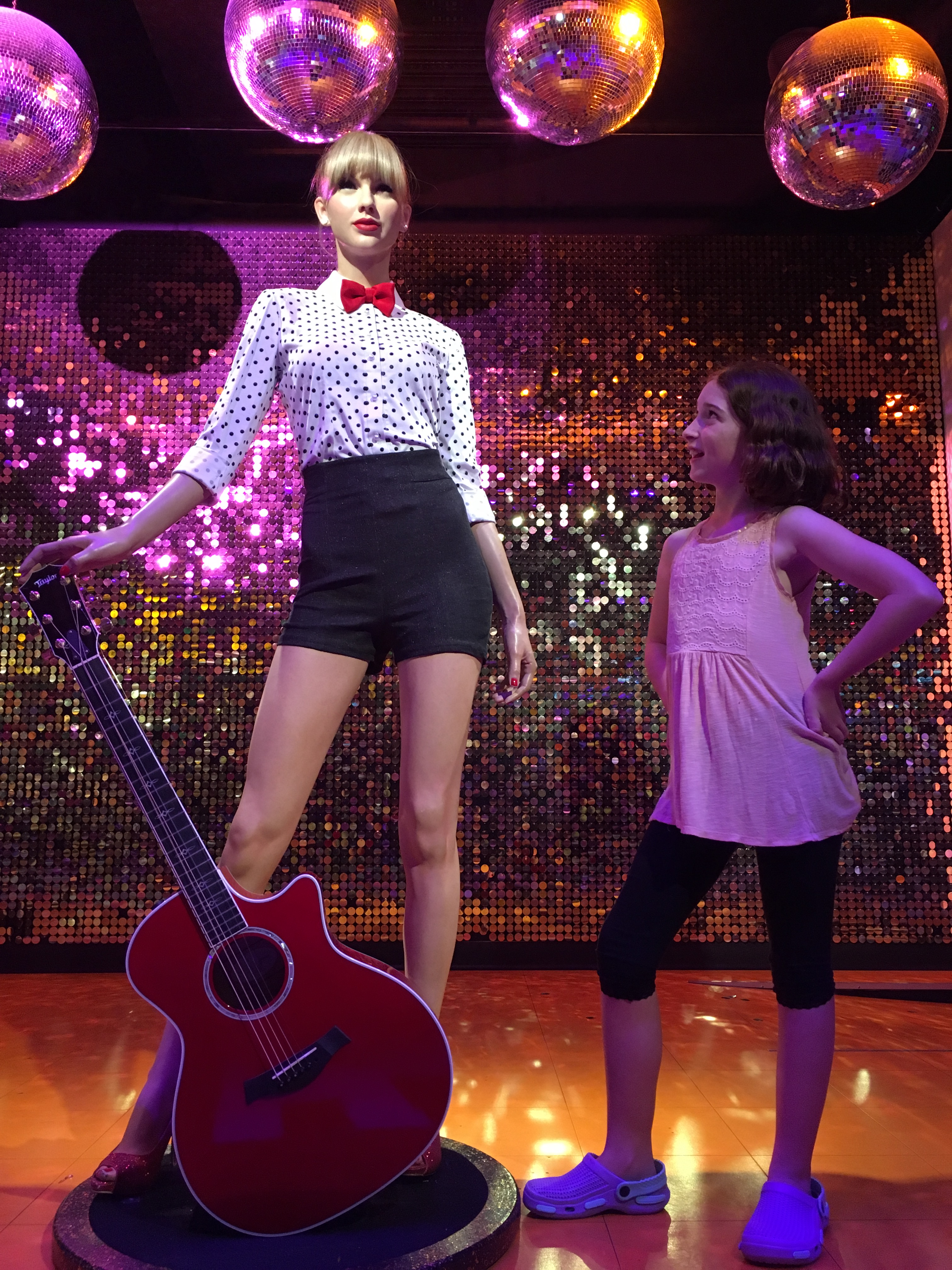
A wax figure of Swift at Madame Tussauds Sydney; she is a popular inspiration for upcoming artists, especially for women in music.

Swift, who identifies as pro-choice, is a feminist figure in the media. Her career has been studied to understand its feminist aspects. She has criticized the way media depicts women; for example, in an appearance on the show Tout le monde en parle, Swift stated she "couldn't stand the way media portrays young women as rivals rather than allies." She has regularly donated to various feminist causes and women's empowerment programs. According to a 2023 survey by Morning Consult, 52% of Swift's U.S. fans are women, while 48% are men.

=== Dating ===
Swift's romantic life is highly publicized. Her dating has been a subject of tabloid scrutiny and has thus prompted some pop culture news outlets to slut-shame her. The media enjoys guessing the celebrity inspiration behind Swift's songs, in the words of Rosen, who wrote that outlets maligned Swift "as a serial kisser-and-teller, as an entitled rich kid, as a mean girl with a victim complex", attributing it partly to the "shrill" tone of Swift's early songs. However, Rosen also stated that there is "a sexist double standard in the policing of Swift's confessions, especially when you consider the routine misogyny in the songs of rockers, rappers, and woebegone beardy indie balladeers." Some media outlets and journalists are also noted for their bias, frequently vilifying Swift for clickbait or to gain readership, capitalizing on consumer interest in "juicy" details about Swift's life.

Celebrity men Swift has dated include American singers Joe Jonas and John Mayer, actors Lucas Till, Taylor Lautner, and Jake Gyllenhaal, English singers Harry Styles and Matty Healy, actors Tom Hiddleston and Joe Alwyn, and Scottish DJ Calvin Harris. Media outlets have further alleged romantic relationships with Canadian actor Cory Monteith, American singers Adam Young and Chord Overstreet, actor Zac Efron, English actor Eddie Redmayne, and Swedish actor Alexander Skarsgård, as well as American actress Dianna Agron and model Karlie Kloss as part of the Gaylor theory. Swift started dating Kelce in 2023, and married him in 2026.

==== Travis Kelce ====
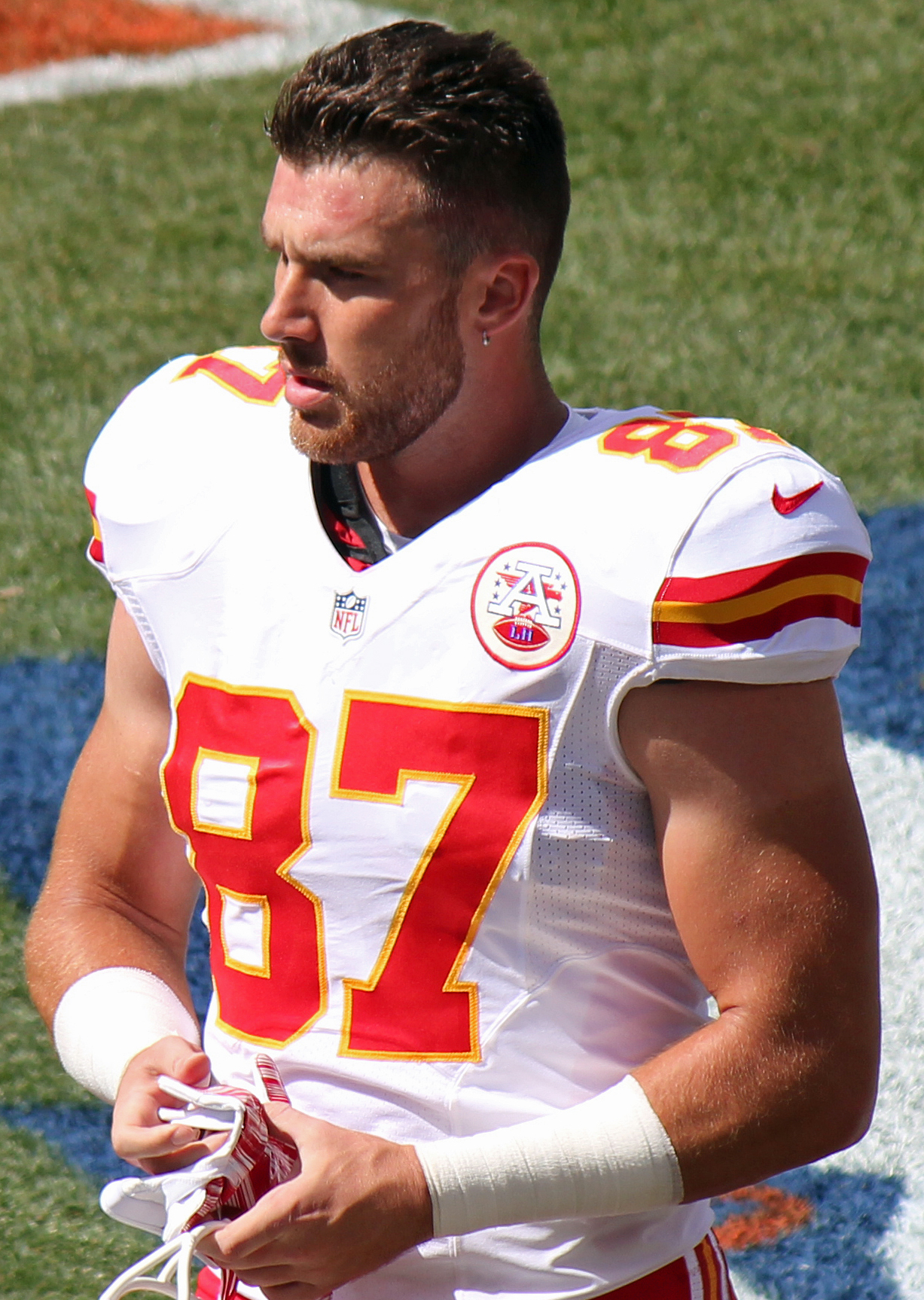
American football player Travis Kelce, Swift's husband

Pop culture commentators and journalists describe Swift and Kelce as a supercouple, often as America's very own "royal couple". Emily Yahr opined in The New York Times that the U.S. "giddily contemplates" the pairing of Swift and Kelce that, "for many observers, checks all the right boxes", whereas Andrew Unterbeger opined that the pair resulted in a "near-100% public approval" because "it just felt right: the All-American athlete dating the All-American pop star." Robert Armstrong of Financial Times described Kelce as a royal consort and "the most important boyfriend in the world; perhaps the most important boyfriend in all of human history." A television special by Nightline about the relationship and its impact, titled Taylor + Travis, was released on Hulu in November 2023. Dressing up as Swift and Kelce was a trend during Halloween 2023. Kyle Chayaka of The New Yorker wrote, "The narrative, admittedly, was almost too neat: America's sweetheart dating the national equivalent of a homecoming king".

In August 2025, after Swift announced details The Life of a Showgirl on Kelce's podcast New Heights; they became engaged behind-the-screen, whose announcement became one of Instagram's top 10 most-liked and reposted posts. The couple married in a highly publicized but private wedding ceremony at the Madison Square Garden, New York City, on July 3, 2026. Every detail about the wedding inspired headlines. Journalists dubbed it as an American royal wedding, with many calling it the greatest wedding of the year, decade, or century. The wedding was met with a rave response from the fans, public, press and social media, though some criticized its extravagance.

=== Misogyny ===
More songs are about love than anything else – how wonderful it is when it begins, and how deeply painful it can be when it ends. Taylor Swift did not invent this idea. People have been singing songs about broken hearts as long as music and broken hearts have existed, and her male peers aren't questioned in quite the same way she is. Heartbroken girls are labeled as whiny in our society, while heartbroken guys are endearing and lovable. And it sucks.

— Nicole Pomarico, "Taylor's Pointing Out Sexism in The Music Industry", Bustle

Journalists have reported on the intense misogyny and slut-shaming directed at Swift, who has been vocal in condemning all forms of sexism. She highlighted misogynistic language used against her in tabloids and headlines, as well as sexist comments discrediting her achievements. She stated that her "dating life has become a bit of a national pastime" and does not appreciate the "Careful, Bro, She'll Write a Song About You" trope as it "trivializes" her artistry. Some opined Swift is an easy target for male derision, triggering "fragile male egos", and that she "infuriates male critics by not looking like a sexpot", challenging the male gaze. According to Rosen, some media and public censure Swift's "acidic" lyrics about former partners while praising male artists like Bob Dylan, Elvis Costello and Drake for the same, revealing the double standards. Several former detractors of Swift have blamed their subconscious misogyny. The Daily Telegraph opined that Swift's antennae for sexism are crucial for the industry.

In various media, Swift has been the subject of comments, "jokes", punch lines and memes that have been perceived as sexist. The New Feminist highlights, apart from sexist men, several women also channel their internalized misogyny towards Swift. At the 70th Golden Globe Awards (January 2013), hosts Tina Fey and Amy Poehler delivered a joke about Swift, following tabloid news that week that claimed Swift had broken up with Conor Kennedy; Fey said that given Swift's "interest in famous guys", she should stay away from actor Michael J. Fox's son, who was escorting the award winners off the stage that evening. Poehler disagreed and said "Swift should go for it", to which Fey retorted. The joke was the subject of viral news coverage. Fey also had a history of joking about Swift's dating life. Two months later, when Vanity Fair asked about Fey and Poehler, Swift quoted Madeleine Albright: "there's a special place in hell for women who don't help other women." She subsequently elaborated:

"For a female to write about her feelings, and then be portrayed as some clingy, insane, desperate girlfriend in need of making you marry her and have kids with her, I think that's taking something that potentially should be celebrated—a woman writing about her feelings in a confessional way—that's taking it and turning it and twisting it into something that is frankly a little sexist."

In June 2013, American retail company Abercrombie & Fitch sold shirts saying "More Boyfriends than T.S." After backlash from Swift's fans, the retailer withdrew them. Westboro Baptist Church leader Ben Phelps called Swift the "poster child for the young whores of doomed America", accusing her of "fornication and sin-coddling songs", and announced plans to protest at her concert. In October 2014, on Australian radio show Jules, Merrick & Sophie, Swift stated she is "unfairly criticized" for her lyrics compared to her male peers:

"You're going to have people who are going to say, 'Oh, you know, like, she just writes songs about her ex-boyfriends.' And I think frankly that's a very sexist angle to take. No one says that about Ed Sheeran. No one says that about Bruno Mars. They're all writing songs about their exes, their current girlfriends, their love life, and no one raises the red flag there."

In a 2016 interview, when asked what advice she would give her 19-year-old self, Swift replied, "Hey, you're going to date just like a normal twenty-something should be allowed to, but you're going to be a national lightning rod for slut-shaming." In a 2019 interview with New Zealand DJ Zane Lowe on Apple Music 1, Swift stated that the slut-shaming "happened to [her] at a very young age, so that was a bit hard. That was one of the first times [she] was like—Wow, this is not fair." In the article "Why women say sorry too much and what to say — and do — instead" for the Australian Broadcasting Corporation, Kate Midena highlighted Swift's comments on her struggles to "deprogram the misogyny in my own brain" in Miss Americana. Midena wrote that being trained to say sorry is "a conundrum women have been stuck in since the middle ages" and that girls are often taught to value empathy over "masculine traits" such as strength and assertiveness, and hence they "feel the need to cushion their actions with an apology".

Taylor Swift
(@taylorswift13)
tweeted:

Hey Ginny & Georgia, 2010 called and it wants its lazy, deeply sexist joke back. How about we stop degrading hard-working women by defining this horse shit as FuNnY. Also, @netflix after Miss Americana this outfit doesn't look cute on you. Happy Women's History Month I guess

March 1, 2021

In March 2021, Swift criticized the writers of Netflix series Ginny & Georgia for using a "lazy, deeply sexist joke" slut-shaming her. Beth Ashley of Grazia wrote sexism is why male celebrities like Pete Davidson are celebrated for his dating history, while Swift is "shamed and shunned". In 2024, Ekta Sinha of Elle attributed much of the criticism and vitriol Swift has historically received to the fact that the majority of her audience are women; she said "men love hating on the things women enjoy", citing Barbie (2023) and the South Korean boy group BTS as further examples.

In a controversial June 2024 Newsweek opinion piece, writer John Mac Ghlionn questioned if Swift is a good role model for girls as she is "unmarried and childless" at age 34. It was criticized as misogynistic, with the Evening Standard's Claire Cohen saying "if Swift was married with children, she'd be criticised for leaving her family at home while she selfishly went on tour and accused of emasculating her husband by being the breadwinner." Arwa Mahdavi of The Guardian wrote, "this extraordinarily misogynistic piece is noteworthy because it reflects the manosphere's toxic obsession with Swift... There's nothing insecure men love more than trying to bring successful women down a peg or two."

=== Sexual harassment ===
In August 2017, a sexual assault trial was held in the United States District Court for the District of Colorado, involving former DJ David Mueller, a KYGO-FM radio employee, who filed for defamation against Swift. He claimed she had him wrongfully terminated following an incident at a 2013 meet-and-greet, in which Swift posed for a photo with Mueller. Swift alleged Mueller reached under her skirt and grabbed her buttocks in the photo. Mueller was escorted out of the concert once Swift reported it to her mother and team. The incident was reported to KYGO, and Mueller was fired shortly thereafter. He sued Swift for defamation in September 2015, claiming he never touched Swift under her skirt and that he lost his job and reputation due to her false claims. Swift counter-sued Mueller for battery and sexual assault, seeking $1 in damages. The jury ruled in Swift's favor.

The trial was a subject of wide media attention due to Swift's status as a high-profile celebrity. In a post-trial statement, Swift revealed she counter-sued Mueller to empower other victims of sexual assault. The BBC stated that the trial was culturally significant as it highlighted the underreporting of sexual assaults, Swift's refusal to back down even though the defense lawyers attempted to discredit her, and the symbolic $1 damages. Brand strategists said that Swift "has been not only trying to empower ordinary women that she doesn't know but also music industry colleagues" with the case. Public relations expert Marvet Britto stated that Swift "is aware that her defiance in fighting against these allegations—not only made toward her but other artists and colleagues—will achieve global visibility around sexual assault issues that, in many cases, go unreported and ignored and are marginalized." In December 2017, Swift was named a "Silence Breaker" in Time magazine's Person of the Year issue. Elle described the trial as a landmark case "aiming to not bankrupt the perpetrator, but to set a precedent for other artists and women around the world to speak up and hold predators accountable for the irreparable damage they cause." Additionally, Swift donated $250,000 to American singer Kesha in 2016 to assist her with the legal fees for her sexual assault case, and further donation to the Joyful Heart Foundation for survivors of sexual assault in 2017.

In January 2024, artificial intelligence (AI)-generated deepfake pornographic images portraying Swift spread across multiple social media platforms, provoking criticism and calls for legislative reform from the White House and SAG-AFTRA. Twitter suspended several accounts that posted the controversial images, with one tweet of the screenshot of the images receiving over 47 million views before the account was finally suspended. Twitter also temporarily blocked searches of "Taylor Swift" on the platform. U.S. Senators Dick Durbin, Lindsey Graham, Amy Klobuchar and Josh Hawley subsequently introduced the DEFIANCE (Disrupt Explicit Forged Images and Non-Consensual Edit) Act to federally prohibit digitally forged media that depict an identifiable person without their consent. As per the cybersecurity company McAfee, Swift is the world's most deepfaked celebrity. She has trademarked pornographic website domain names, such as "taylorswift.porn" and "taylorswift.adult", to prevent them from being misused, in a measure known as cybersquatting. After the AI boom in 2026, in light of the earlier deepfake controversy, Swift filed to trademark her voice and appearance against fake reproductions.

=== Feminist perspectives ===
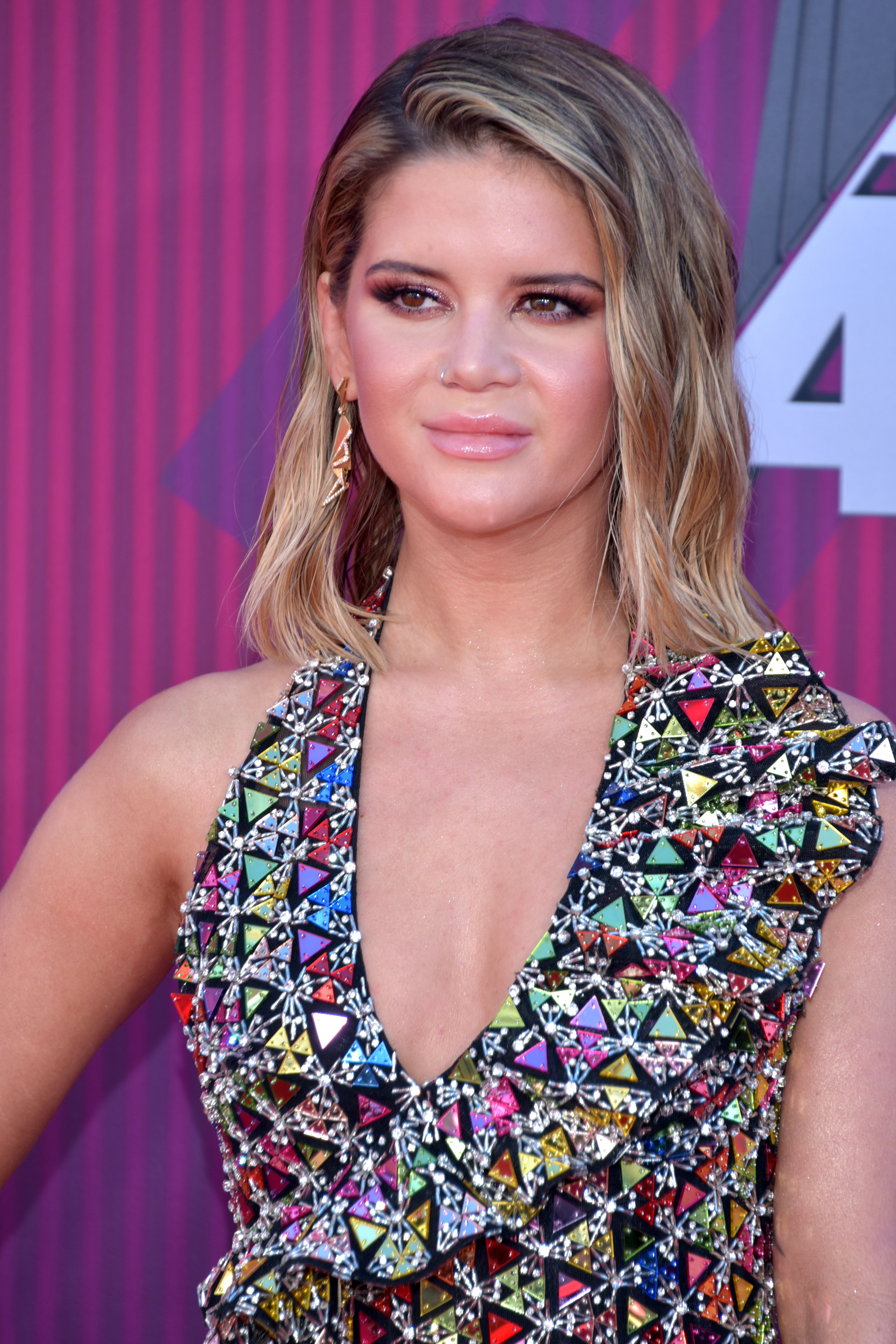
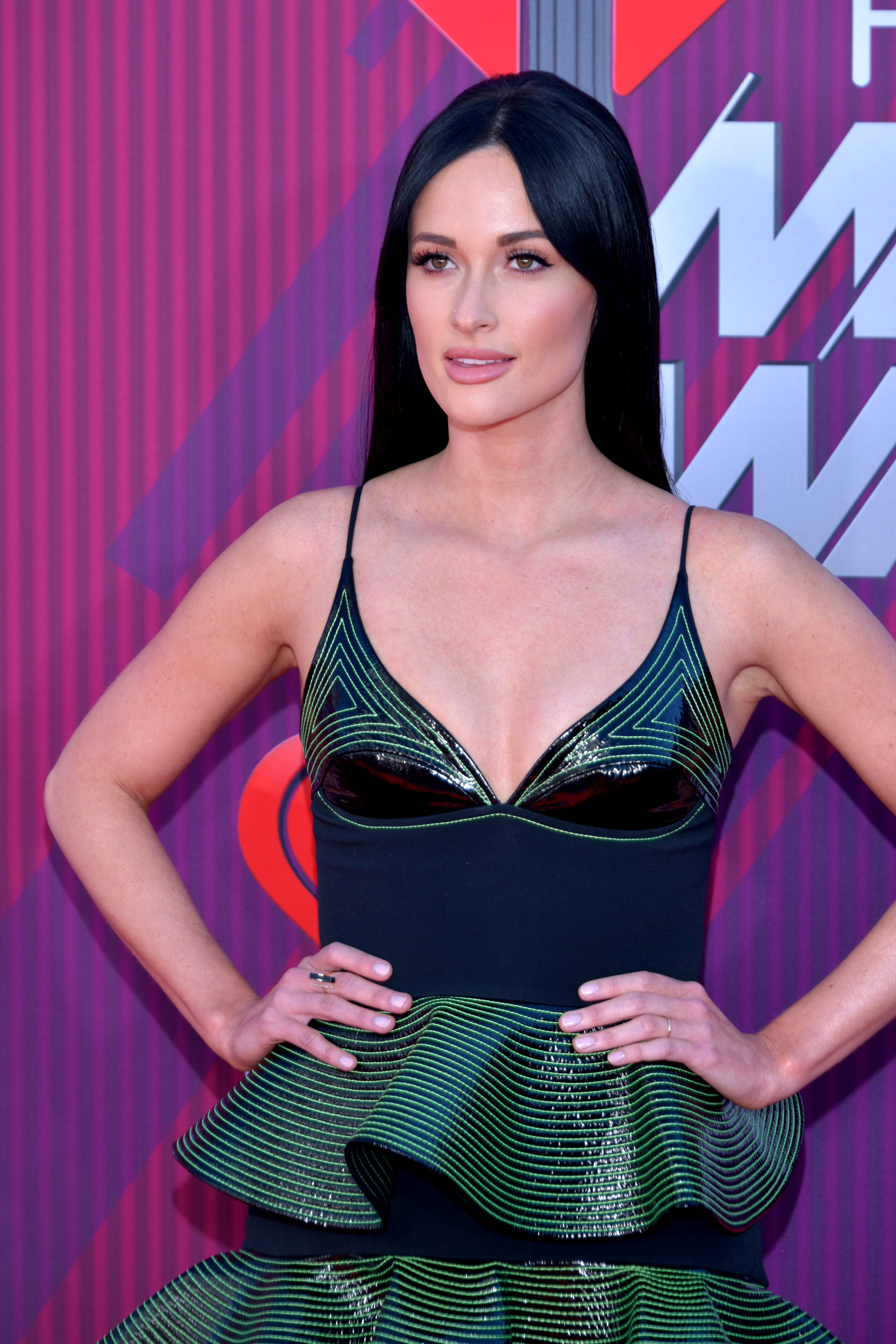
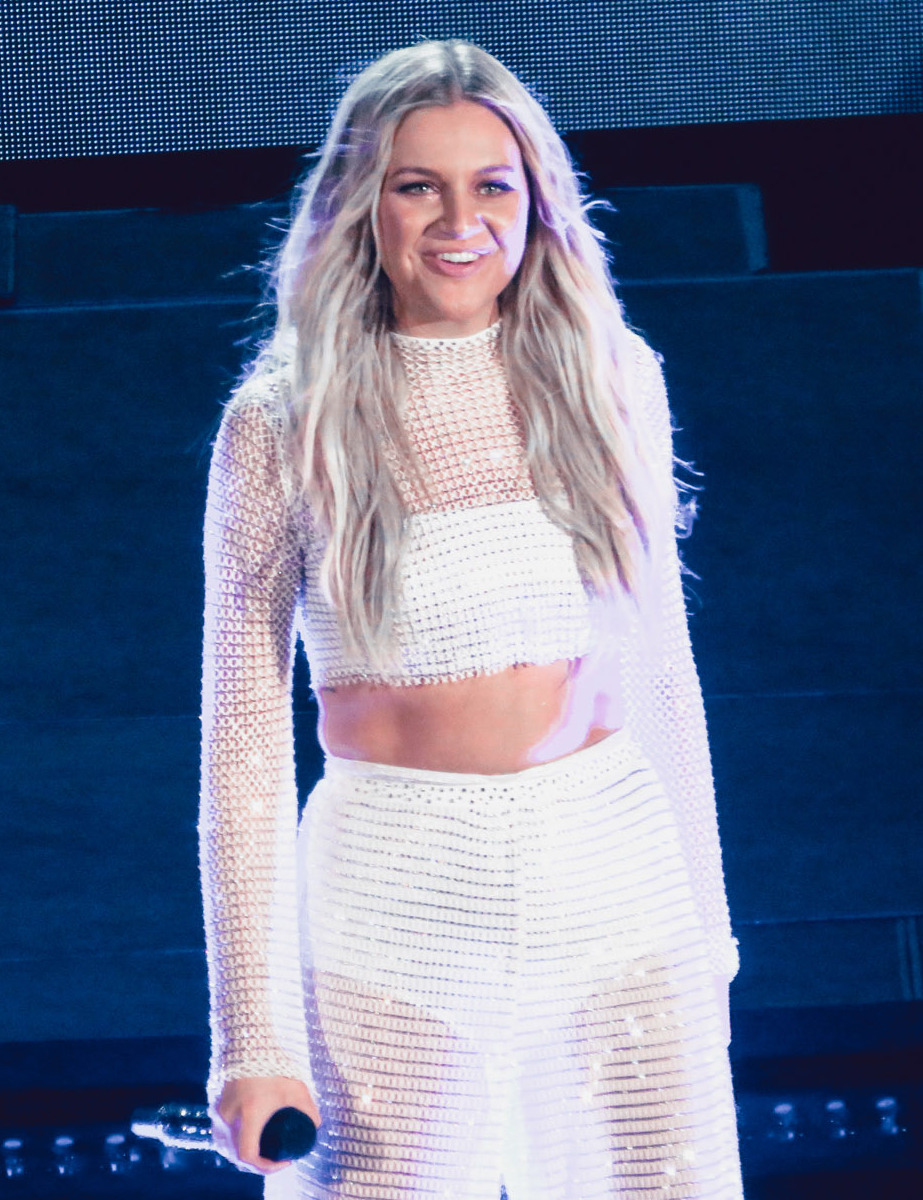
Swift is credited with shaping the career trajectories of female country artists such as (from left to right) Maren Morris, Kacey Musgraves and Kelsea Ballerini.

Critics have noted Swift's musical style resonating in albums released by female country singers like Kacey Musgraves, Maren Morris and Kelsea Ballerini. Swift's onstage guitar performances contributed to the Taylor Swift effect—a phenomenon to which upsurge in guitar sales to women, a previously ignored demographic, is attributed. According to Todd Cassetty, president of Cassetty Entertainment, "everybody was trying to mimic" Swift and that many young women "were inspired to pick up a guitar" because of her. Jim D'Addario of the guitar manufacturer D'Addario and Brian T. Majeski of The Music Trades also attributed the guitar sales surge to Swift. British journalist Neil McCormick attributed the breakout success of female singer-songwriters Sabrina Carpenter and Chappell Roan in 2024 to a precedent set by Swift as a woman dominating pop music.

"There's her odd brand of beauty, part Barbie, part Southern belle: Swift's career has always seen her playing with the tropes of femininity—the homecoming queen, the fairy nymph, the socialite—only to subvert them with a goofy charm."

— Jo Ellison, "Why I believe in Taylor Swift", Financial Times

Journalists Shah Ezayadi and Raza-Sheikh attributed much of Swift's commercial success with making her young female audience feel "understood"; the latter opined that Swift is a cultural litmus test: "can we begin to respect art created by famous women, particularly when it explores love stories and womanhood?" Kayla Bartsch of National Review attributed Swift's stardom to "her unmatched ability to capture the essence of the modern woman." According to Time journalist Sam Lansky, Swift allows "people, many of them women, particularly girls, who have been conditioned to accept dismissal, gaslighting, and mistreatment from a society that treats their emotions as inconsequential" to believe that their emotions and thoughts matter.

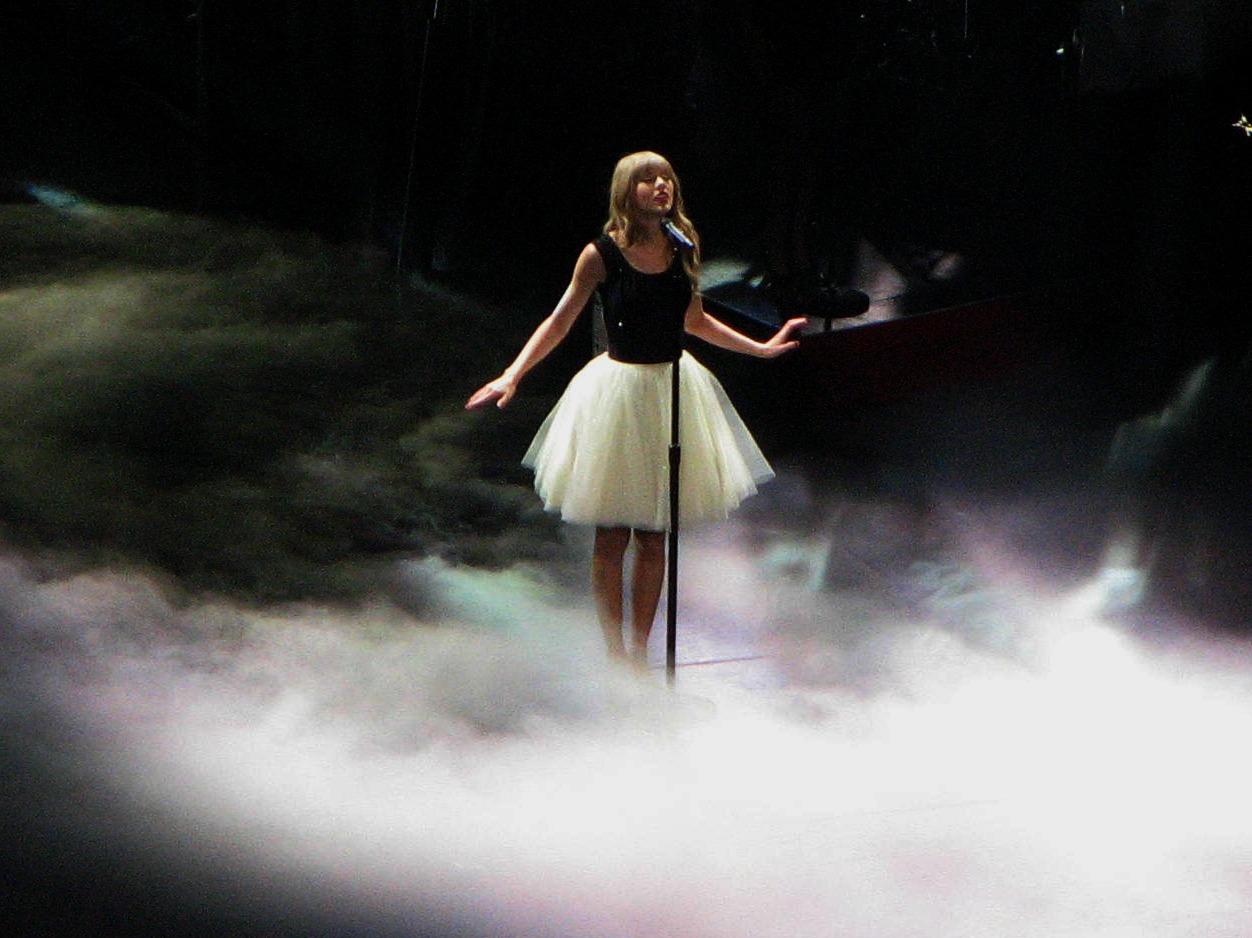
Swift performing "Treacherous" (2012) at the Red Tour (2013); critics note it as one of Swift's first songs to have sensual lyrics about sex.

Feminism is a core aspect of Swift's discography, particularly since 2014. According to Rosen, Swift existed on the modest, "Victorian" end of the feminist spectrum, compared to pop stars like Beyoncé, Lady Gaga, Rihanna, and Miley Cyrus, who "represent aggressively sexualized feminist pop, harnessing big beats and skimpy outfits to work through questions of power and self-determination"; however, Swift's songs "aren't totally chaste: Sex is there in the rush and flush of the music, and it peeks through, discreetly, in the lyrics."

Matthew Green, professor of literature at the University of Nottingham, felt that Swift has transformed tropes of "monstrous femininity—the lamia, the witch, the madwoman—into symbols of empowerment." Film scholar Barbara Creed of the University of Melbourne agreed, claiming Swift's misogynistic experiences led her to embrace her "monstrous-feminine" abjection while "questioning patriarchy, anthropocentrism, misogyny and the meaning of the human". Examples of Swift's songs that address feminist themes include "I Did Something Bad" (2017), "The Man" (2019), "The Last Great American Dynasty" (2020), "Mad Woman" (2020), "Vigilante Shit" (2022), and "Would've, Could've, Should've" (2022). Songs such as "Nothing New" (2021), "Castles Crumbling" (2023) and "Slut!" (2023) explored Swift's views on being a woman in the public eye.

Swift's 2014 single "Blank Space" is a satirical feminist critique of her portrayal in media. The Guardian columnist Jessica Valenti called its music video a "dystopian feminist fairytale", playing into the "annoying, boy-crazy" tropes media projected on Swift. In the music video for "The Man", Swift portrays a male alter-ego named Tyler Swift, presenting several prevalent examples of sexist double standards, including objectification, sexualization, toxic masculinity, and patriarchy. iHeartRadio's Paris Close said it demonstrates "how the hubris of male privilege plays out in the real world".

Swift played a man (middle) in the music video for "The Man" (2020) to ridicule sexist double standards.

The artistic reinventions of her career were also examined feministically. Swift said, "The female artists I know of have to remake themselves 20 times more than the male artists, or else you're out of a job" in regards to the music industry "discarding" female pop stars as soon as they reach their mid-30s. The 2020 Prospect article "It's time to face the facts—our male pop stars need to try a bit harder" pointed out the requirement for female pop stars to be "highly visual, and to change that visual often". Vanessa Friedman, chief fashion critic of The New York Times, considered Swift's "hamster wheel of constant reinvention" a meta-commentary on the expectation that female pop stars "unveil new versions of themselves for our viewing pleasure, one-upping their old image with new wardrobes ad infinitum", while male pop stars do not change much. Jeff Nelson of People opined Swift "has taken a hammer to that glass ceiling, shattering expectations—and blazing a path for the next generation of female artists."

In a contradictory perspective, even though Swift described herself as a feminist, her 2014–2015 public appearances and social media posts with female singers and fashion models whom the media called her "squad" gave some the impression that she did so to keep her name afloat in media. A number of critics claimed Swift's feminism lacks intersectionality, causing her to come off as a white feminist whose "clique was really just an exclusive group of mostly white actresses and supermodels." In light of a variety of criticism Swift has received in the media, author Jennifer Weiner opined that "everything" being Swift's "fault" is an example for how "it's impossible for any woman—whether superstar or mere mortal—to get it right", referring to the scrutiny Swift has received for the demeanors of her former partners, her private jet in regards to climate change, white feminism, "sins of capitalism", and even "mutant cats"—her Scottish Fold pet cats have "boosted the breed's popularity, causing unscrupulous opportunists to over-breed them, which resulted in unfortunate genetic mutations."

== Fashion ==
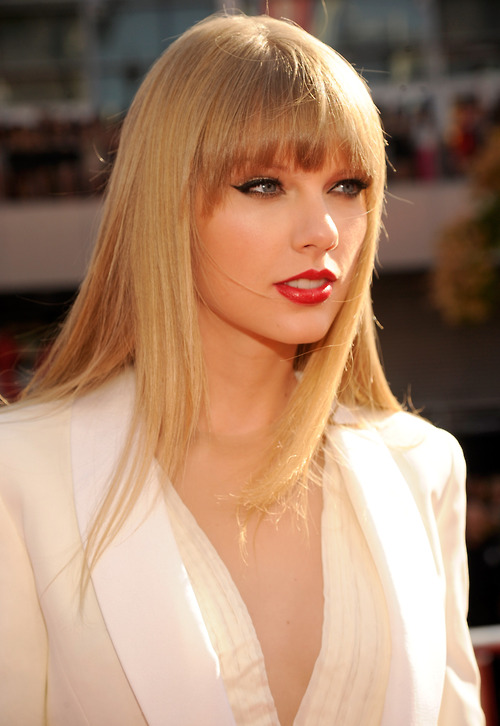
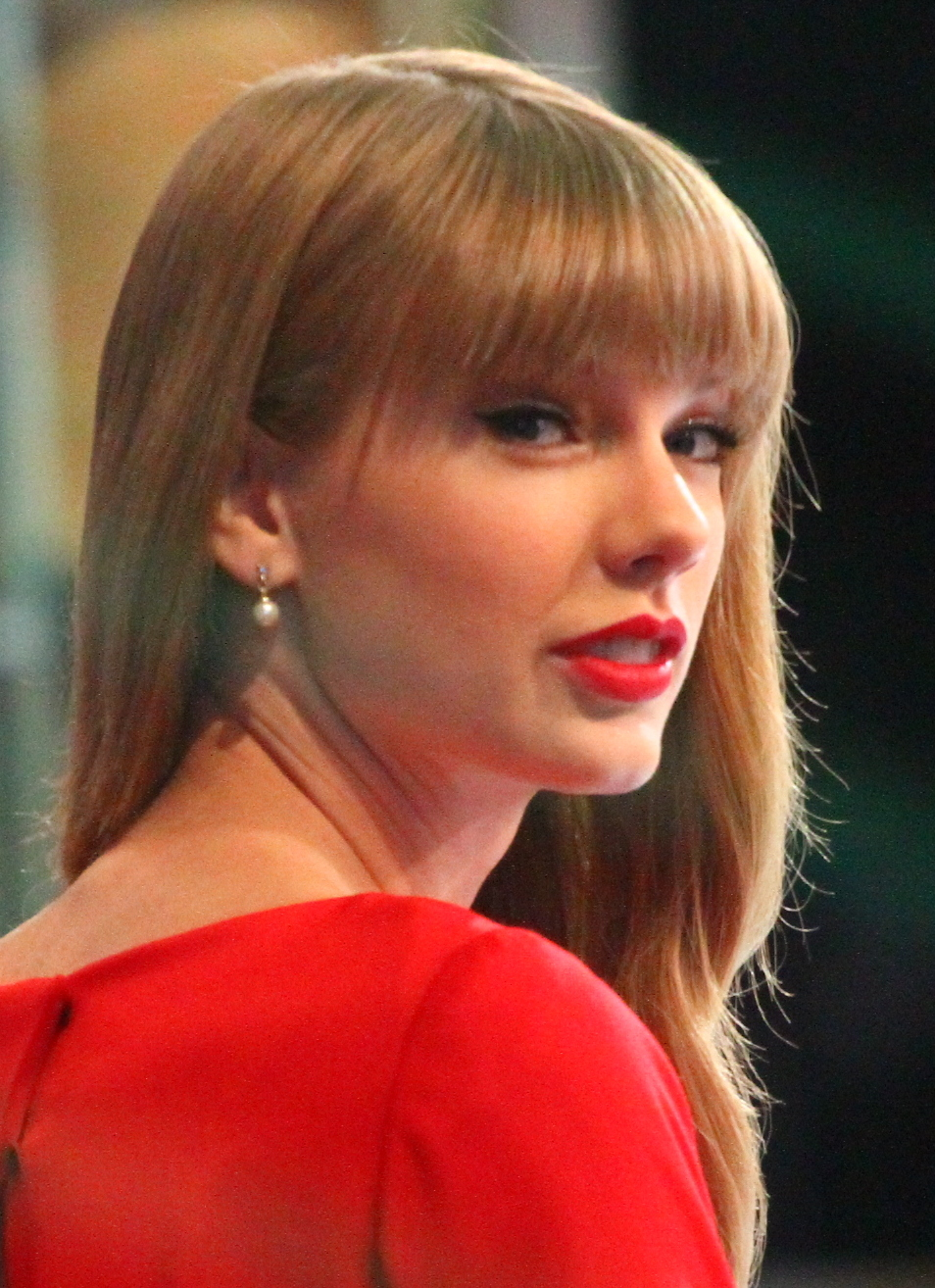
Swift at the 2012 MTV Video Music Awards (left) and on Good Morning America (right) in her signature bangs and red lipstick

Swift's fashion is widely covered by fashion journalists, and her street style has received acclaim from critics. She has reinvented her image and aesthetic throughout her career, matching respective album cycles with distinct themes and influencing fashion trends in the process. People described her style as that of an it girl. Her style evolution, both within and outside her music, has been the subject of widespread analyses by media outlets. Her dressing style involves synchronizing outfits, blending classic, retro and "cool" elements, floral prints, Mary Jane or Oxford shoes, Jimmy Choo boots, and other accessories from Aldo, Prada, Christian Louboutin, Elie Saab, Dolce & Gabbana, Vivienne Westwood, Louis Vuitton and The Row. Her street style features a variety of classic, casual staples, such as denim shorts, white tops, baseball caps, loafers, plaid skirts, combining them with "unique jewelry, bold lipstick, and trendy designer handbags."

Critics have opined, Swift's general disinterest in provocative high fashion despite her wealth, which can be perceived as a "bad taste" in fashion by some fashion critics, is part of her popular appeal that sets her apart from pop stars like Madonna and Beyoncé. Amanda Krause of Business Insider described Swift's style as simple and attainable, without the "shocking fashion antics of Doja Cat, Lady Gaga, and Kim Kardashian." According to Zoe Suen of South China Morning Post, many critics are not impressed by Swift's "authentic" style choices and her lack of participation in fashion weeks or luxury brand collaborations. Suen said: "It's safe to say that while Swift has chosen not to brand herself as an haute couture-wearing stylephile." Similarly, culture writer Emily Kirkpatrick categorized Swift as a "fashion anti-hero". Lauren Sherman, a fashion correspondent at Puck, labeled Swift's style as "Anthropologie Gone Wild— mismatched, outdated, pedestrian, but instinctual." Savannah Bradley of Business Insider opined that Swift's "normal" taste in fashion is an aspect of her strategic "Swiftian brand philosophy", where Swift is the audience's "best friend".

The Wall Street Journal noted her pairing of higher-end labels with relatively affordable brands, making her style "accessible", which often result in record impressions and surging sales for the lesser-known fashion labels she wears. Fashion reporter Sarah Chapelle said that it contributes to her "approachable, relatable" image. Vogue's Jonah Waterhouse commented, Swift has no use for high fashion as she does not use it to propagate her career like other musicians have to. He opined that "Swift's wardrobe, in its authenticity to her personal brand and taste, embodies quiet power", as fashion does not influence Swift but she influences fashion instead. Olivia Petter of The Independent considered the critique Swift receives for her fashion as sexist, questioning why every woman in entertainment are expected to deliver over-the-top fashion and Swift for one cannot be allowed to detach herself from such scrutiny. Jake Henry Smith of Glamour echoed the same sentiment, saying Swift dresses like a "normal person".

=== Clothing styles ===
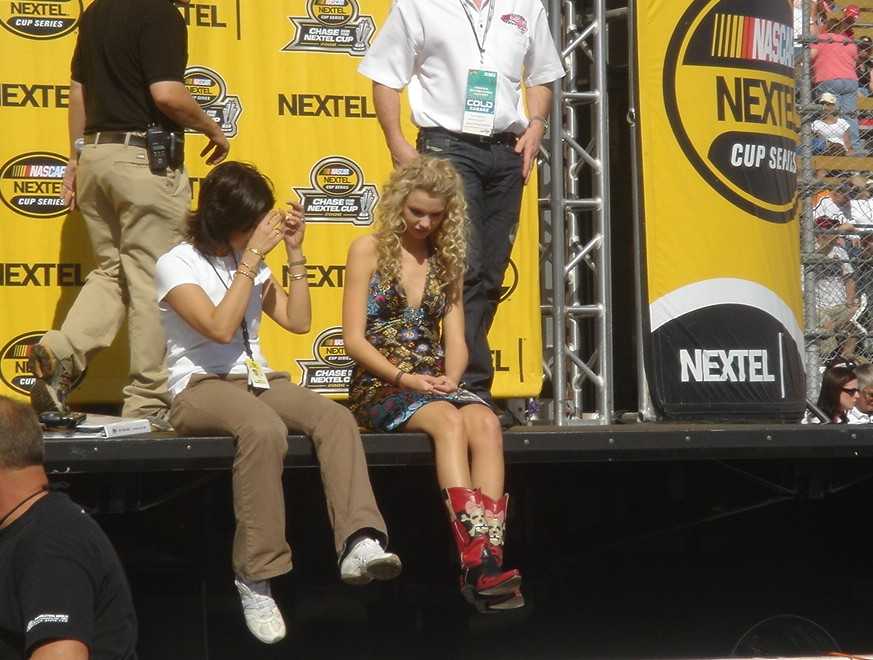
A pre-fame Swift in 2006, wearing a sundress and cowboy boots

Each of Swift's album cycles featured a corresponding fashion style. During her career beginnings in country music, Swift's girl-next-door image was accompanied by boho-lite sundresses, midi skirts, cowboy boots, and a headband. The music videos for "Our Song", "Teardrops on My Guitar", and "Love Story" saw her embodying a "princess" persona by wearing tulle skirts, gowns and corset with floral embellishments. While promoting Fearless, Swift donned "glittery gold outfits", ball gowns, and winged eye liner, exploring more bold and mature garments, often incorporating lower cuts, "elegant" necklines, sequined fringe, and looser curls. During promotion of Speak Now, Swift incorporated purple and pink shades in her outfits and sported a ponytail, donned Oxford shoes, beanies, collared dresses, and cable-knit sweaters.

For Red, in 2012–2013, Swift adopted an autumnal wardrobe, wearing bold red lipstick, straight blonde hair with bangs, fedora hats, high-waisted shorts, translucent shirts, stripped tees, knit scarves, raincoats, and saddlebag purses, incorporating more shades of red. This established the "retro-cool" hipster-inspired aesthetic. During promotion of 1989, when Swift moved to New York City, her casual street style was often photographed and covered. She had a bob cut and wore neon colors, jumpsuits and two-pieces: crop tops and miniskirts.

At the 2016 Met Gala, which she co-chaired, Swift changed her style drastically in a look that trended on Twitter as "Bleachella", debuting black lipstick and bleached blond hair, in a snakeskin dress that would indicate a transition to her next album, Reputation. The black color dominated the "moody" wardrobe throughout the Reputation campaign, alongside thigh-high boots, dark red lipstick, bodysuits, leotards, hoodies, and cargo pants with camouflage patterns, and serpentine prints and jewellery. In 2019, Swift reinvented her style once again; camp was her leading fashion motif for Lover and she dyed a portion of her hair pink.

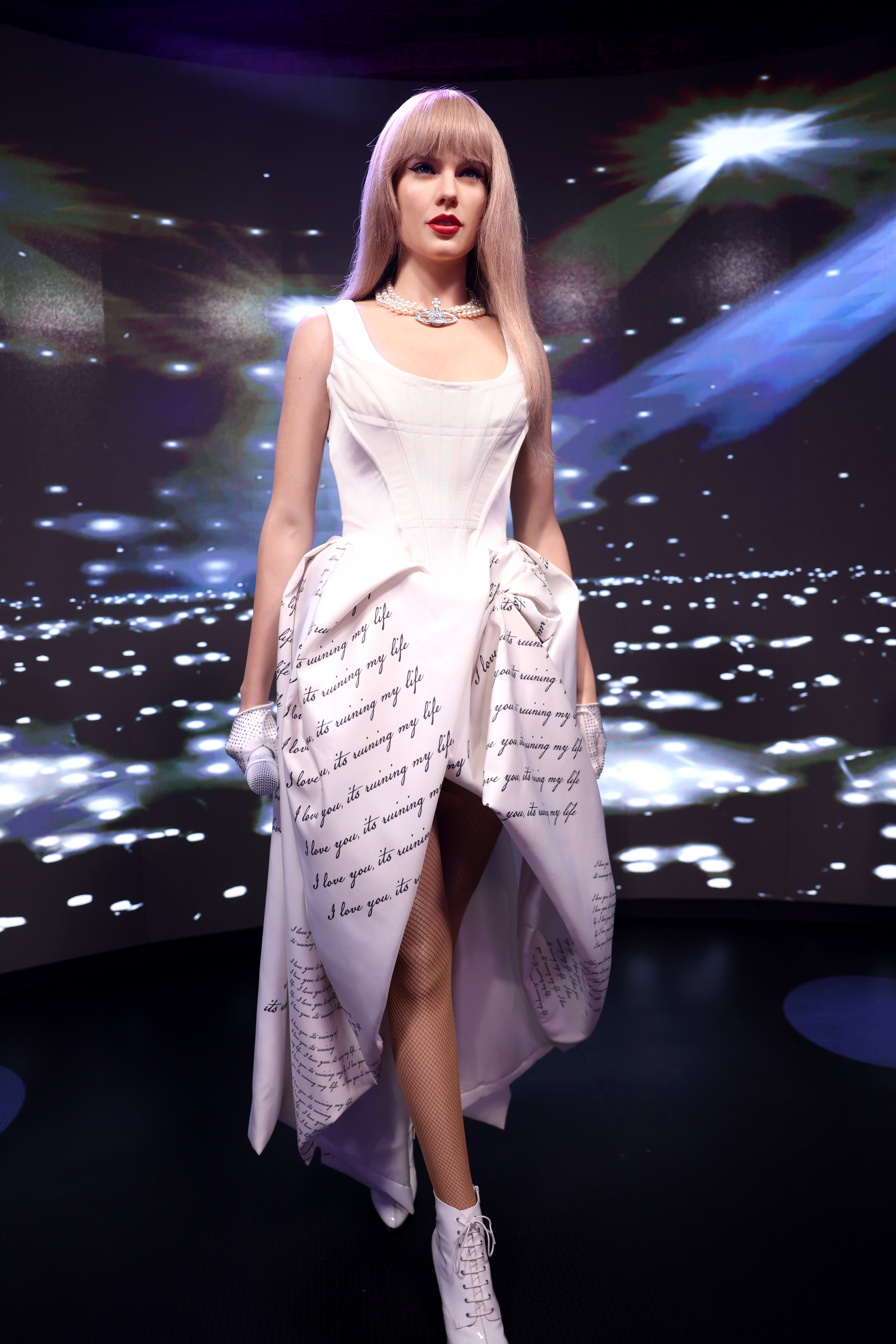
A wax figure of Swift in a TTPD attire at Madame Tussauds Sydney.

Swift opted for cottagecore aesthetics with Folklore and Evermore, channeling a rustic, nature-focused look; she dressed herself in lace and gingham clothes, with mussed hairstyles, turtlenecks, and long woolen coats. For Midnights, Swift leaned towards a dichotomy of glamorous, vintage 1970s aesthetic: bodices, faux fur, and diamond jewelry on one end, and cashmere, polo shirts, corduroy pants, and wide-legged trousers. She adopted a gothic mood with The Tortured Poets Department, whose cover artwork is a shot of Swift lying on a bed wearing black lingerie: a see-through top and high waist shorts. Journalists dubbed the fashion as mainly dark academia, with influences of coquette, inspired by classic American poets. Following her relationship with Kelce from 2023, Swift adopted a WAGs-inspired "game day style", appearing in Kansas City Chiefs merchandise and customized outfits. Her game-day fashion received acclaim. For The Life of a Showgirl, Swift adopted a maximalist, extravagant showgirl-inspired style, dressing in bejeweled bra tops, bodysuits and headpieces; fishnet tights; feathers; and boas.

=== Trends ===
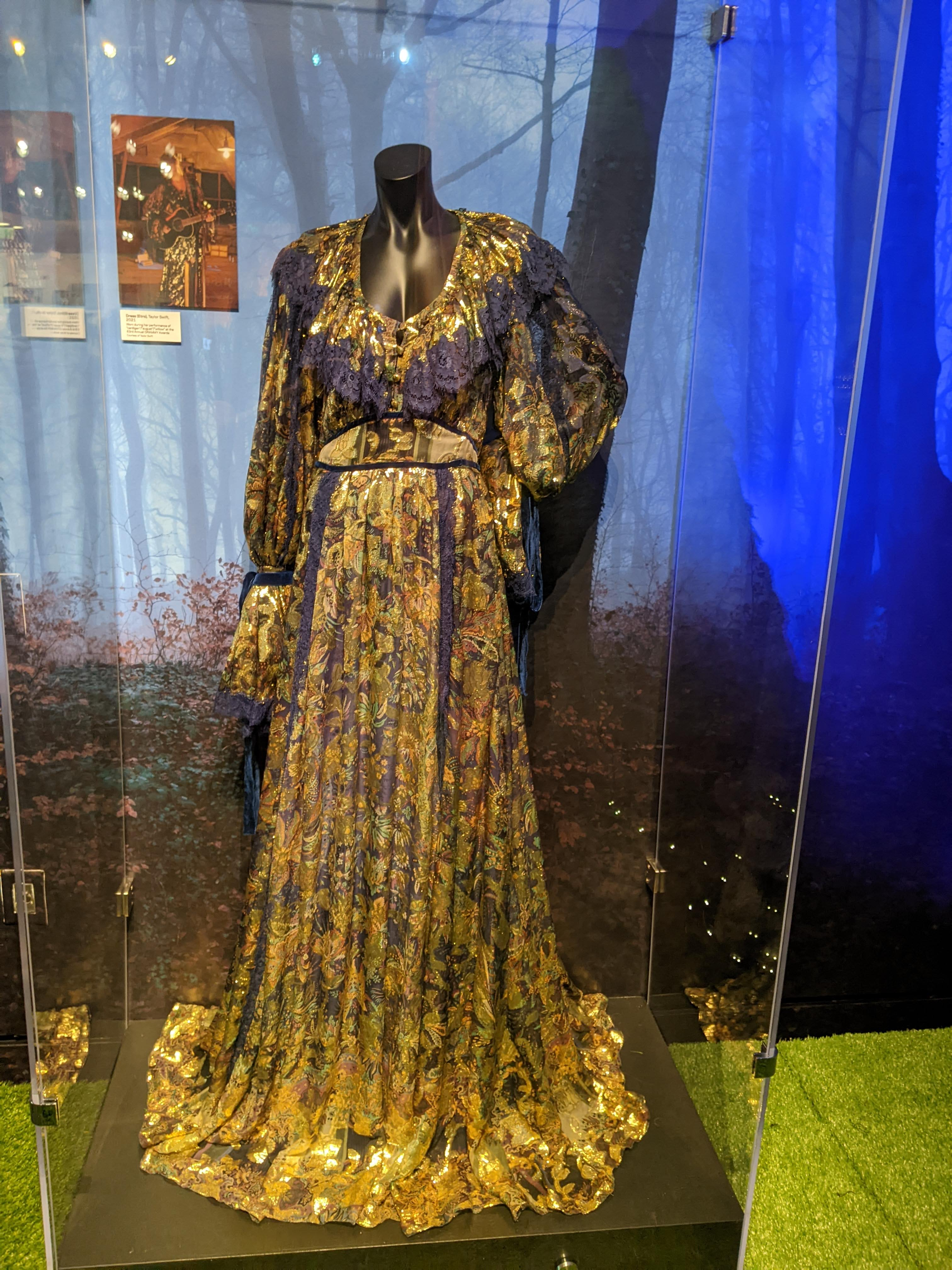
Swift's signature cardigan, flannel coat, and gown from her Folklore and Evermore eras exhibited at the Country Music Hall of Fame (left) and the Grammy Museum (right)

Her music, visuals, general attire, and concerts have influenced fashion trends and led to sales surges. She boosted the popularity of red lipsticks—considered one of her signature fashion motifs, especially since Red, which prominently featured red lips in its cover. Swift helped popularize women's sleeveless formal wear, waistcoats, and thigh jewellery. Hairdressers have credited Swift with popularizing "low-maintenance and natural looking" hair in women's hairstyles.

"The scarf" mentioned in autobiographical lyrics of "All Too Well" has become a signature object associated with Swift. Cottagecore experienced a resurgence on the internet after Swift adopted the aesthetic, increasing sales of hand-knitted Aran jumpers in Ireland and the U.S. Irish broadcaster RTÉ credited Swift with putting cardigans "back on the map" with Folklore. Upon Evermore's release, replicas of the flannel coat Swift wore on the cover artwork sold out on Farfetch instantaneously.

The Eras Tour increased demand for metallic boots, cowboy hats, and sequin dresses. CNN reported that fashion retailers marketed their products to target attendees of the tour, with various clothing brands creating a range of items inspired by Swift and her "eras" and scoring their biggest sales year yet. Some scholars felt Swift mainstreamed gothic aesthetics with Reputation and The Tortured Poets Department, the former characterized by its snake-inspired cyber-gothic motifs and the later mainly dark academia. When Swift began dating American football player Travis Kelce and attended several of his games wearing Kansas City Chiefs merchandise in 2023, both the team and the National Football League (NFL) were met with unprecedented increase in merchandise sales. The non-merchandise pieces that she wore to the games, belonging to female-owned small businesses, were also met with record sales.

Swift on the June/July 2015 cover of the men's magazine Maxim, featuring a photograph from her androgynous editorial for Wonderland

In 2014, People named Swift the Best-Dressed woman of the year, calling her a "street style queen". American fashion designer Tommy Hilfiger referred to Swift as a "new icon" of the American style, owing to her "charismatic" summer outfits. In 2015, Swift won the Elle Woman of the Year award for cementing herself as a style icon capable of "seamlessly switching between chic street style and glamorous couture gowns on the red carpet", and topped the 2015 Maxim Hot 100 list. Critic Francesca Wallace wrote in 2018 that Swift's authentic look is her "easygoing, feminine" and "dainty" take on fashion, incorporating bows, prints and carryall bags, creating a street style "worth copying". Sarah Midkiff of Refinery29 compared Swift's simplistic looks to that of a "classic English Rose". A 2024 Boohoo.com survey stated that Swift has been the most sought-out "style icon" of the 2020s decade, with an estimated 78,725 average monthly searches relating to her fashion.

The Wall Street Journal dubbed Swift as a "fashion-selling machine". Prominent luxury brands like Versace and Schiaparelli experience brand value boosts from Swift. Versace garnered nearly US$3.1 million in media value across the 35 days that the Eras Tour had been in Europe. Ralph Lauren earned US$6.8 million within 48 hours of the news of Swift's engagement. Fashion dubbed it the "Taylor Swift effect" and compared it the impact of Kate Middleton and Meghan Markle on fashion. Sandra Choi, creative director of the British luxury fashion house Jimmy Choo, claimed that Swift has reinforced their design expertise and provided them with global visibility. Mansur Gavriel and AREA are amongst the other high fashion houses that have had their items sell out because of Swift. Retail companies like Free People and Hill House Home have also largely benefitted from her. Jen Nurick of Vogue Australia regards Swift as an influential figure in sustainable fashion.

A number of small-business boutiques and brands have reported overnight success after Swift wore one of their clothes or fashion accessories. On October 8, 2024, Swift wore "glitter freckles" from Fazit Makeup Patches, a previously unknown small-business beauty brand, to a Kansas City Chiefs–New Orleans Saints game. In the first two days, the brand experienced a 2,500 percent sales spike, selling out on Urban Outfitters and Amazon.

== Wellness ==
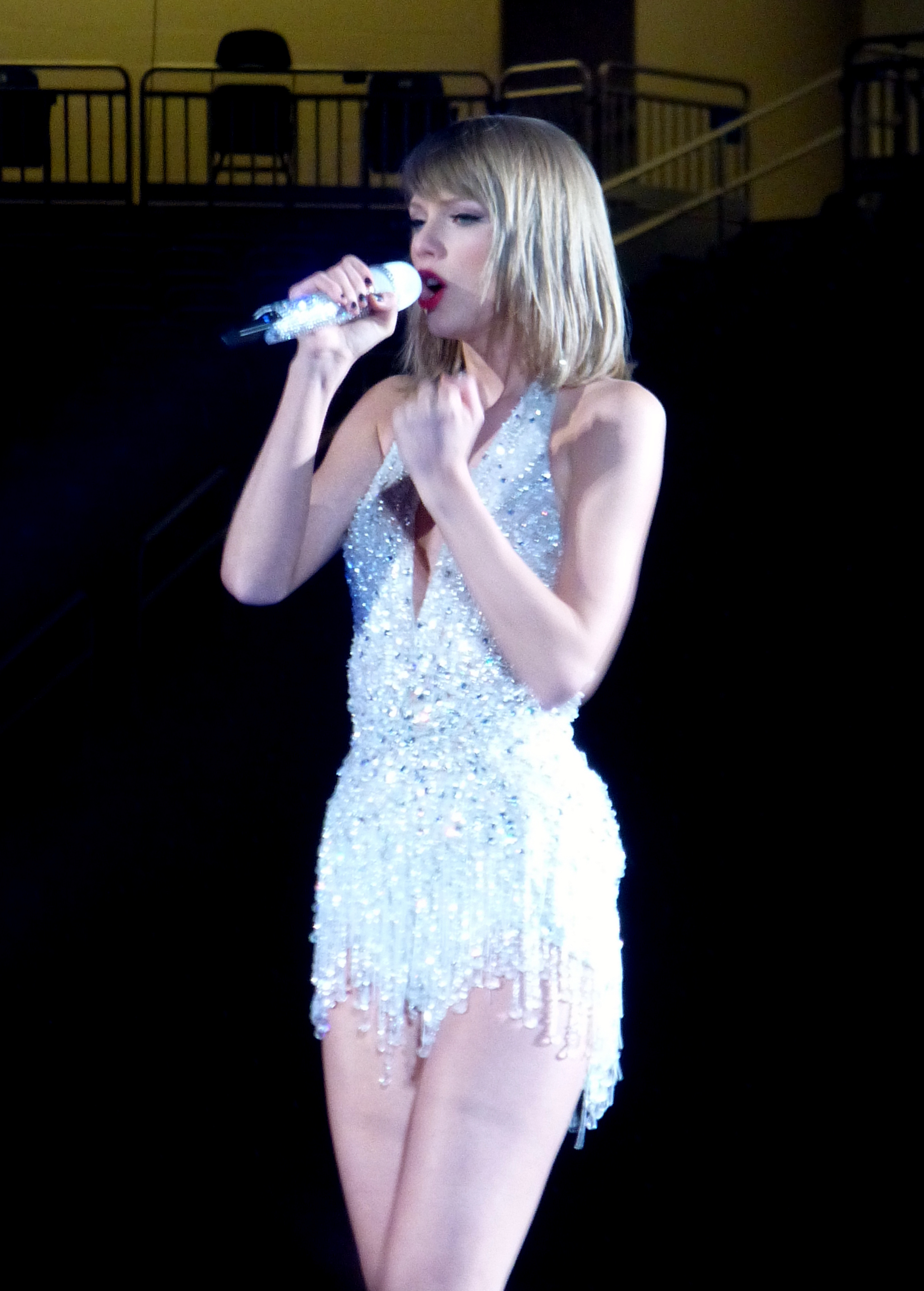
Swift at the 1989 World Tour (2015); she was criticized for being "thin" and "skinny" by some general public and a number of media outlets, unbeknownst to whom she was suffering from an eating disorder.

Swift has frequently received body shaming comments from media outlets and on social media, criticizing or scrutinizing her physical appearance especially when she was considered "skinny" in 2014 and when she gained weight between 2017 and 2019. She has been vocal about the impact of such press coverage on personal health, discussing issues such as eating disorders, body dysmorphic disorder, anorexia athletica, self-esteem, and cyberbullying. Swift stated in Miss Americana that she used to "starve" herself while working out excessively after reading articles describing her as pregnant based on photographs in which her stomach looked "big", a confession that precipitated responses from and discussions on mental health amongst the public.

There's always some standard of beauty that you're not meeting. Because if you're thin enough, then you don't have that ass that everybody wants, but if you have enough weight on you to have an ass, then your stomach isn't flat enough. It's all just fucking impossible.

— Swift in Miss Americana, "Taylor Swift discloses fight with eating disorder in new documentary", The Guardian

The Daily Targum noted that despite being an expert in handling negative criticism, even Swift "succumbed to insecurities that blossomed into eating problems, which shows how even the strongest among us are susceptible to potential eating disorders due to the toxic environment of social media". Jessica Gold, professor of psychiatry at Washington University in St. Louis, commented, "when our political leaders are struggling to build consensus on and convey the gravity of issues" like mental health, Swift is sending a powerful message by opening up about her issues—"one that is likely to save lives in myriad ways". Ellen Ricks of HelloGiggles called Swift's reveal of her disorder inspirational, noting "how it can potentially impact so many people still fighting", as "there is still so much stigma and misinformation" surrounding it. Discussing Miss Americana, writer Elana Fishman confessed, "every so often, I'll still catch myself criticizing the way my tummy or legs look in a photo or how a certain pair of pants fits me. From now on, whenever that happens, I'll be repeating a line Swift says in the film: 'We do not do that anymore, because it's better to think you look fat than to look sick'". Miss Americana also prompted critics of Swift to respond, such as comedian Nikki Glaser, who said her comments about being skinny came from a place of insecurity. Journalist Richard S. Hé stated the intention of their 2016 Vice article "Taylor Swift Isn't Like Other Celebrities, She's Worse" was to "deconstruct the pettiness of the celebrity–industrial complex" but regretted it could have been unduly critical of Swift.

A scene from the music video of "Anti-Hero" (2022) depicts Swift's body dysmorphia resulting from the eating disorder.

A scene in the music video for Swift's 2022 single "Anti-Hero", which depicts alter egos of Swift interacting with each other—a depressed and homely Swift stepping on a bathroom scale that reads "fat", making the glamorous popstar Swift shake her head in disapproval—invoked a mixed response on social media, where some accused Swift of fatphobia. An opinion on The Cut said the scene "reinforces the idea of being ‘fat' as bad". Several others defended Swift; journalists in The Guardian, The Independent and The Daily Telegraph, and television shows like The View sided with Swift, arguing that, given her history with an eating disorder, she should not have to "sanitize" her psychological trauma to make her art "digestible" for audiences. They claimed that video illustrates "the warped workings of her brain back when she was in the throes of an eating disorder". The video was however edited to remove the controversial word "fat", which also sparked criticism. Maya Georgi of NBC News questioned why Swift has "once again, let criticism control her actions", feeling the scene demonstrated "the damage the rhetoric of valuing thinness and demonizing larger bodies has done" to Swift and other women. Tomás Mier of Rolling Stone wrote Swift "had to water down her artistic expression and how she chose to portray her lived experience".

== Politics ==
Swift's political views have a significant influence on her public image. Political journalists and authors note Swift as a powerful personality, particularly in American politics, often described as the most influential musician politically. She has used her fame to incite political action. Governmental figures outside the U.S. have also shown admiration for Swift, such as Gabriel Boric, President of Chile; Pita Limjaroenrat, member of the House of Representatives of Thailand; Leni Robredo, former Vice President of the Philippines; Liz Truss, former Prime Minister of the U.K.; William, Prince of Wales; and Mexican Supreme Court justice Arturo Zaldívar. Organizations such as the European Union have acknowledged her political influence.

== Sports ==
Swift has affected sports culture, particularly since 2023. Various sports teams, organizations, franchises and venues have profited vastly from Swift. She has been named as a role model by a number of athletes and sportspersons at-large, such as Kobe Bryant, Jimmy Butler, Rob Gronkowski, Bryce Harper, Clayton Kershaw, Jessica Korda, Sarah Nurse, Mikaela Shiffrin, Iga Świątek, Russell Westbrook, Emma Weyant, and Serena Williams. Swift has promoted and supported various US athletes and teams at the Olympic Games, such as Simone Biles, Sha'Carri Richardson and Katie Ledecky, via narrated NBC promotional videos.

The romantic relationship of Swift and Kelce has had a cultural impact, about which Billboard opined that the two "are arguably the world's most high-profile couple right now, consistently making headlines on the daily for simply holding hands or enjoying dinner together." Kelce's relationship with Swift has significantly increased his popularity amongst casual and non-NFL fans. For example, he tallied the most fan votes of any other NFL players for the 2025 Pro Bowl Games, the NFL's All-Star event. The NFL games Swift attended of Kelce's team, the Kansas City Chiefs, broke numerous viewership records, including record high female viewership. The NFL and NBC Sports used the relationship for social media content and to promote subsequent games; skin care brand Cetaphil aired a Super Bowl commercial referencing Swift's role in widening the league's appeal to female audiences. The Times of India opined that Swift has redefined "WAG culture".

Some of the television rating records broken by the games attended by Swift include:

- Chiefs–Chicago Bears on September 24, 2023: 24.32 million viewers on Fox Sports, the most television viewers of the weekend.
- Chiefs–New York Jets on October 1, 2023: 27 million viewers across all NBC broadcasts, making it the most-watched Sunday-night television show since Super Bowl LVII.
- Chiefs–Buffalo Bills on January 21, 2024: 50.393 million viewers, marking the most-watched NFL divisional playoff game ever and the most-watched program on any network since Super Bowl LVII.
- Chiefs–Baltimore Ravens on January 28, 2024: 55.5 million viewers, marking the then most-watched AFC Championship Game of all time. This record was broken by the next AFC Championship Game, played between Chiefs—Buffalo Bills on January 26, 2025, which had 57.4 million viewers.
- Chiefs–San Francisco 49ers (Super Bowl LVIII) on February 11, 2024: 123.4 million viewers on CBS/Paramount+ and 202.4 million total viewers, then the most-watched non-news telecast of all time and the most-watched broadcast since the Apollo 11 moon landing, until it was surpassed by Super Bowl LIX's 127.7 million viewers (which also featured the Chiefs and was attended by Swift).

== Demographics ==
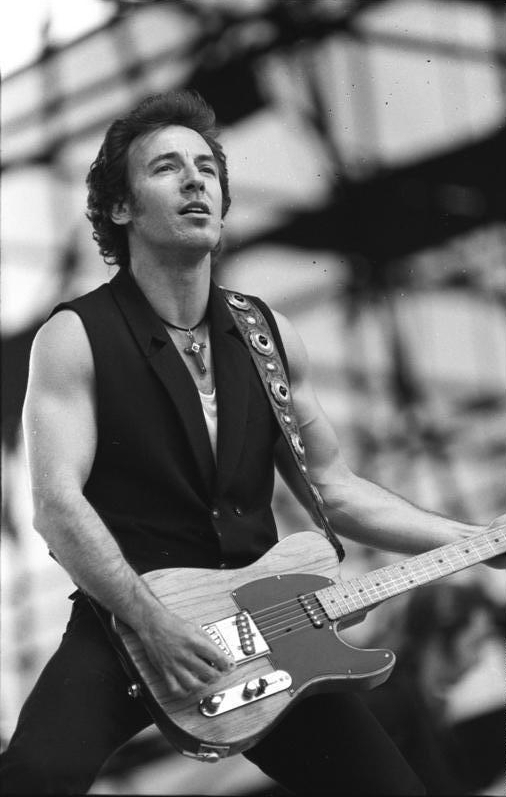
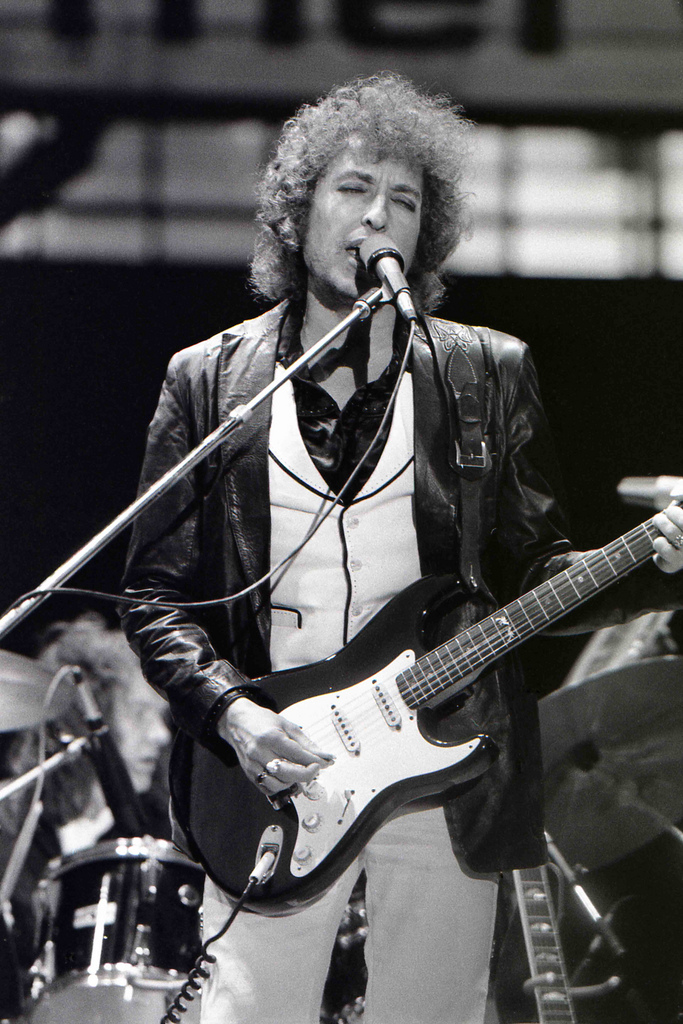
Swift is frequently compared to 20th-century singers like Bruce Springsteen (left) and Bob Dylan (right) in terms of generational impact.

Critical commentary has analysed Swift's pan-generational appeal. Journalists have used Swift's career to mark a paradigm shift in popular culture, regarding her as a millennial cultural figure. According to Rosen, Swift is a "generational bard", merging "the pleasures of old-fashioned songcraft with millennial social-media oversharing." Psychiatrist Suzanne Garfinkle-Crowell opined that Swift is the generational poet laureate who has a song for every precise emotion of a listener. Besides Bartsch, various authors describe Swift as a philosopher. Canadian historian Elizabeth Vlossack dubbed Swift a historical figure.

A 2023 Pollstar survey reported Swift had the most positive impact on the youth's mental health amongst all the music acts. A 2024 survey undertaken by The Washington Post stated that Swift is a source of fascination for fans and non-fans of all age groups. In 2025, YouGov ranked Swift as the famous pop artist of all time.

American author Neil Howe, who coined the term "millennial", named Swift as the classic example of millennial spirit. In 2010, The Christian Science Monitor commentators Morley Winograd and Michael D. Hais opined that Swift's rise to fame signals the "musical coming-of-age" of the millennial generation and that "it's only a matter of time before Swift and her generation make over America's music as triumphantly as they did its politics with the election of President Obama." Awarding Swift for her humanitarian endeavors in 2012, former First Lady of the U.S., Michelle Obama, described Swift as an artist who "has rocketed to the top of the music industry but still keeps her feet on the ground, someone who has shattered every expectation of what a 22-year-old can accomplish".

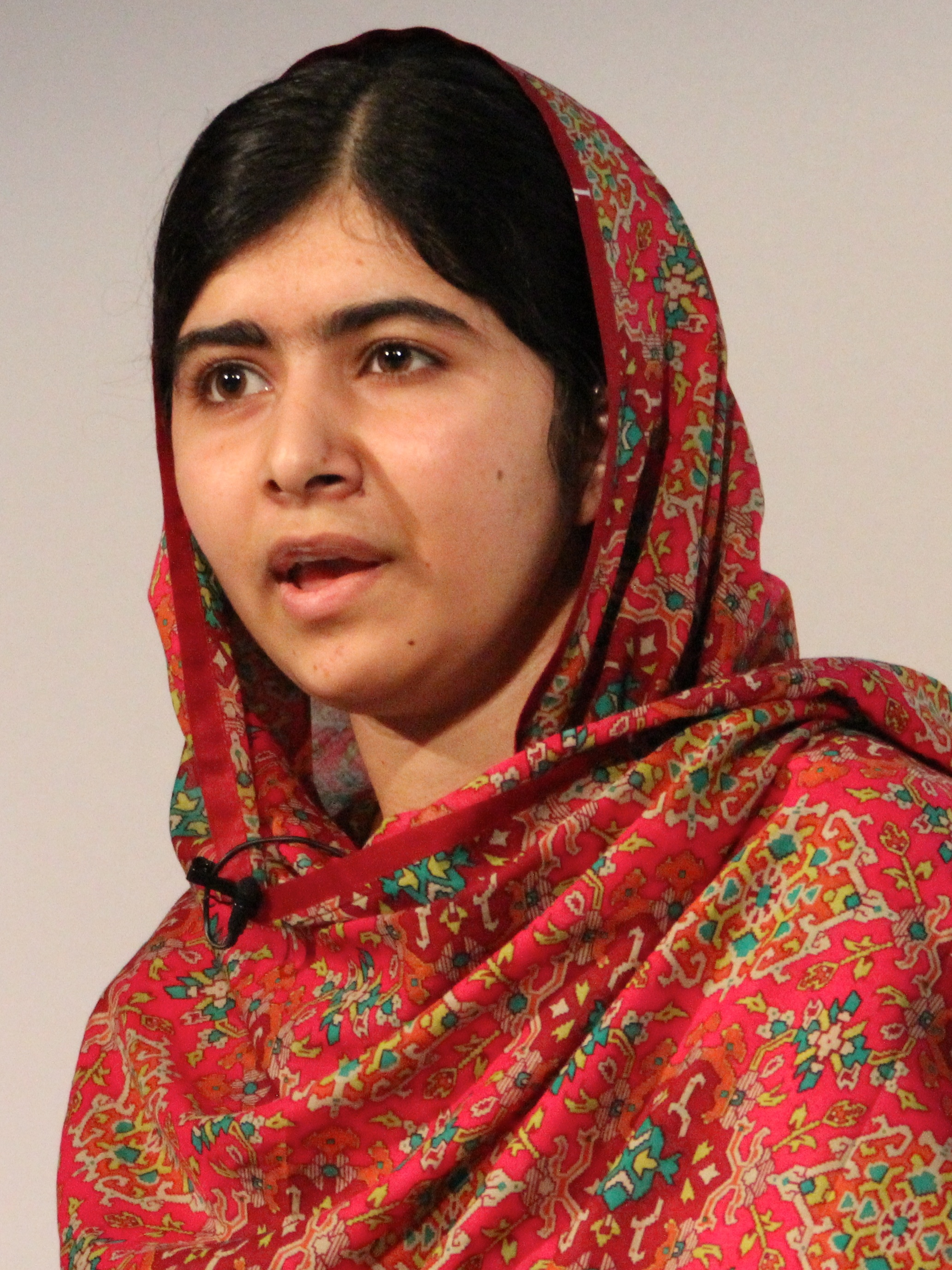
Pakistani educationist Malala Yousafzai dubbed Swift an inspiration for girls. Yousafzai said that she and her friends in Swat District drew strength and comfort from Swift's music when music was forbidden.

In 2014, Quartz's John McDuling said Swift was "quickly becoming the most influential artist of her generation", and pondered if she is the millennial equivalent to Dylan, Springsteen, or Kurt Cobain. National Post opined that 1989—an album created by a millennial for millennials—"lays claim to an entire generation", as average millennials "are constantly exposed to criticism and heavy dialog" like Swift, all of which is embodied by Swift's music. The newspaper considered "New Romantics" (2016) as a millennial ode.

According to a 2019 YPulse survey, Swift is the musician who best-represents millennials (ages 19–37). She represents "millennial anxiety" according to The Walrus's Joelle Kidd, who wrote that millennials have a tendency of "obsessive self-analysis" that Swift has grown to embody, sharing her anxieties with the generation. Some journalists have described The Tortured Poets Department as a study of millennial "misery" and "despair". Today senior editor Elena Nicolaou noted how Swift culturally transformed millennial weddings as well.

Many critics discuss the "millennial cringe" as a part of Swift's appeal. Journalist Brittany Spanos stated that despite Generation Z forming a significant portion of Swift's newer fans, they do not "really understand the cultural history, the sociopolitical and cultural elements that have molded Taylor as a millennial woman because they grew up after that". As a result, some of Generation Z may view some older Swift songs and lyrics as cringe. Helen Lewis of The Atlantic dubbed Swift the "Queen of Cringe". Kayla Kibbe of Cosmopolitan applied a feminist perspective, associating Swift's exploration of cringe in her artistry as a response to the trivialisation of women's emotions, especially heartbreak and anger. Swift's commencement speech at the 2022 New York University graduation ceremony about cringe was positively received by journalists.

Vox and The New Yorker called Swift the "millennial Bruce Springsteen", drawing numerous artistic and sociopolitical parallels between Swift and Springsteen's careers. McCormick wrote in a 2024 article from The Daily Telegraph, "in the same way that [Springsteen] became the poet of the working man, Swift's secret is her ability to read the mind of the modern woman." The Times named Swift "the Bob Dylan of our age" in 2022 and "the confessional queen of Noughties pop". Journalists have also noted Swift's rising success within baby boomers and Generation X, known as "senior Swifties". Alexandra Spring of ABC News opined that Swift's "lovelorn ballads, kitchen bops and revenge anthems" appeal "intensely" to the middle-aged, Gen X generation, who also relate to Swift in terms of navigating the world professionally and culturally. As per Morning Consult, 45% of Swift's U.S. fans are millennials, 23% are baby boomers, 21% are Generation X, and 11% are Generation Z.

== See also ==
- Women in music
- Likeability trap, a campaign tactic often targeted to women
- High Watch and Samuel Goldwyn Estate, two of Swift's high-profile residences
