= Tree Paine =

American publicist

- Born: Trina Snyder; April 1971 (age 55); Costa Mesa, California, U.S.
- Other name: Trina Paine
- Occupation: Publicist
- Years active: 2014–present
- Spouse: Lance Paine (m. 1998)

Trina "Tree" Paine (née Snyder; born April 1971) is an American public relations executive. She has been the exclusive publicist of the singer-songwriter Taylor Swift since 2014. Media publications have described Paine as an elusive publicist.

== Early life and education ==
Trina Snyder grew up in Costa Mesa, California. She attended the University of Southern California, where she joined Pi Beta Phi sorority in 1990.

== Career ==
Paine began her career as an intern at British record label Mute Records in the Sales & Marketing department, after which she worked as a National Marketing Manager at World Domination Recordings and as an executive assistant position in the A&R department at Maverick Records, the record label founded by Madonna. In 1995, Paine joined Interscope Records as a West Coast Marketing & Artist Development representative, working with artists such as No Doubt, The Wallflowers, Snoop Dogg, Nine Inch Nails, and Marilyn Manson.

Paine then left Interscope to launch her own street marketing company, retaining Bonnie Raitt as her first client. Over the years, her client roster grew to include record labels such as Warner Records, Capitol Records, London Recordings, and 143 Records. In 1999, Paine merged her company with Immortal Records and created IR Street Marketing. Paine then took a position at the William Morris Agency in Beverly Hills, where she met Gayle Holcomb, then the Vice Chairman of the Academy of Country Music (ACM), leading to Paine being hired by the ACM in 2002 to oversee media, radio, and marketing at the academy.

In 2007, Paine joined Warner Music Nashville as vice president for publicity. In 2013, she was promoted to senior vice president of publicity, where she oversaw all publicity for Warner Music Group’s country and Christian divisions.

In 2014, Paine announced that she was leaving Warner Music to start her own public relations firm, Premium PR. Her first and only client was Taylor Swift, whose publicist of seven years, Paula Erickson, had reportedly resigned. In 2020, Paine was featured in Swift's autobiographical Netflix documentary, Miss Americana, directed by Lana Wilson. Paine is known for guiding Swift through high-profile moments including the feud with Kim Kardashian and Kanye West, Swift's sexual assault trial against former radio host David Mueller, and the dispute over Swift's masters with her former record label. She occasionally makes statements on her own social media, such as when she directly addressed Big Machine Records on her Twitter account regarding the masters dispute and when she criticized the anonymous gossip outlet DeuxMoi for peddling rumors about Swift marrying her ex-boyfriend Joe Alwyn.

== Reception ==
Paine's PR acumen and handling of Swift's high-press moments have been highlighted and complimented in publications. The Cut opined that Paine has built a reputation as a "quiet but ferocious PR pitbull". Unlike many celebrity publicists, who are generally not known to or popular amongst the fanbases, Paine is a well-known figure among Swifties, having her own fan-following within the fandom, and has received special coverage from publications such as The New York Times for being a "power publicist" and "PR mastermind". The Wall Street Journal called Paine "one of the most powerful people in the entertainment industry". Today opined, "Since the beginning of their work relationship, Paine has been an unassuming yet constant presence alongside Swift at public events". According to Business Insider, Paine's "strategic clapbacks and red carpet chaperoning have made her famous in her own right."

== Personal life ==
In a 1998 Las Vegas wedding, Tree married Lance Paine, a businessman who has served as president of the candy company Goo Goo Cluster and later as president of the Property Brothers-owned company Scott Brothers Global.

Paine has kept a low profile. Much about Paine's personal life is unknown as she shares nothing about herself on social media and refuses to give interviews. According to many publications, however, Paine has built a close and trusting relationship with Swift. Paine maintains a private Instagram account and a public Twitter account where she is active.
