= The Swiftologist =

Singaporean YouTuber and journalist

- Born: Zachary Hourihane; October 1996 (age 30); Singapore
- Education: Sarah Lawrence College (BA)
- Years active: 2020–present
- Known for: Pop Culture Criticism

TikTok information
- Page: zachary
- Followers: 257.5 thousand

YouTube information
- Channel: theswiftologist
- Subscribers: 215 thousand
- Views: 109.03 million

Zachary Hourihane (HAIR-i-han; born 1996), better known as The Swiftologist, is a Singaporean YouTuber, music critic, and journalist. Hourihane creates both long-form video essays and short-form content about Taylor Swift, pop stars, and the music industry at large.

He takes his name from "Swiftology", a growing field of study around Swift, and frequently analyses her Easter eggs and persona, as well as Swiftie fan culture. Hourihane posts primarily on YouTube, TikTok, and Instagram. He also hosts a podcast on pop music, Evolution of a Snake, with co-host Madeline Rubicam, which publishes additional content on Patreon. Here, he publishes livestream and "reaction" videos.

Hourihane has received backlash for his opinionated criticism, notably his analysis of the 2024 It Ends With Us controversy and his review of Chappell Roan's song "The Subway" (2025).

== Early life ==
Zachary Hourihane was born at Mount Elizabeth Hospital in Singapore, to Paul and Jacquie Hourihane. His parents are Irish immigrants, who emigrated there from South Dublin in 1994. His mother worked as a teacher at Pei Hwa Primary School, and became a small businessowner in 2021. He grew up in Singapore, and connected early on with American music, including Swift's, beginning with the music video for "Our Song". He resonated with her relatable lyrics and became a stan. Hourihane's parents received permanent residency in 2008. Hourihane gained traction on Tumblr posting Swiftie content in the early 2010s, eventually catching Swift's attention. He was also invited to a secret album listening session at her Nashville home. He graduated with a Bachelor of Arts in Nonfiction Writing from Sarah Lawrence College.

== Career ==
Before producing independent content full time, he worked at RICE, a Singaporean news outlet. He has also contributed articled to Elle Singapore and Jom, a Singaporean digital magazine. In 2020, his YouTube reaction to Swift's album Folklore gained thousands of views and jumpstarted his social media career. Hourihane has been working as a full time content creator since 2024, after his brand deal, Google AdSense, and subscription revenue eclipsed the salary of his day job.

In April 2025, Hourihane reviewed "Azizam" by Ed Sheeran, calling it “artificial" and lacking "creative evolution"; this review caught Sheeran's attention after it garnered 370,000 views. The two had a brief back-and-forth, drawing response videos from other creators and discussion about contemporary music criticism. In May, Hourihane and Evolution of a Snake co-host Madeline Rubicam received backlash from Swifties for allowing audience members to critique Swift's appearance at a live show. One fan alleged Swift had gotten injectable filler, sparking online debate about body shaming against Swift.

In June, Hourihane and Rubicam hosted a live episode of Evolution of a Snake at the Bluebird Café, a Nashville venue where Taylor Swift was first approached by record executive Scott Borchetta. Hourihane asked an employee about Olivia Rodrigo's 2023 performance there, a moment which was clipped and quickly gained millions of views on X, re-igniting conflict between Swift and Rodrigo's fanbases. The Evolution of a Snake tour encompassed 12 venues across the United States and the United Kingdom, including the Great Star Theater in San Francisco, The Miracle Theater in Washington, D.C., and the Unicorn Theatre in London.

In July 2025, Hourihane interviewed Slovak singer-songwriter Adéla. He has regularly collaborated with fellow YouTube music critic Anthony Fantano since August 2025. In response to an October comment by Justin Tranter on unqualified music critics, Hourihane defended the role of independent criticism as an alternative perspective to PR and record label campaigns. Also in October, a clip from Hourihane's reaction to "Wood", a song from Swift's The Life of a Showgirl gained 4.8 million views in six days.

In January 2026, Hourihane made a cameo in The Moment (2026), a mockumentary about Charli XCX's experiences during the album cycle for her album Brat (2024). In June, he launched Proto Pop, an interview series, on YouTube. Hourihane interviewed pop stars Lizzo in June, Kim Petras in July, and Grimes in October.

== Personal life ==
Hourihane is gay, but did not come out until after high school. He said that he regularly receives ad hominem attacks on his appearance and sexuality, as well as death threats. Amanda Petrusich of The New Yorker, Lindsay Zoladz of The New York Times, and Elena Kostyuchenko are three of his favourite critics and journalists.

Hourihane saw Swift's Eras Tour a total of 13 times, in Dublin, Chicago, Singapore, and London. He is a vocal critic of the Gaylor conspiracy theory, comparing it to QAnon. Hourihane has also criticised Swift's billionaire status and merchandise campaigns.

== Filmography ==
=== Film ===
Year	Title	Role	Notes	Ref(s)
2026	The Moment	himself	cameo	
