= Swifties =

Fandom of Taylor Swift

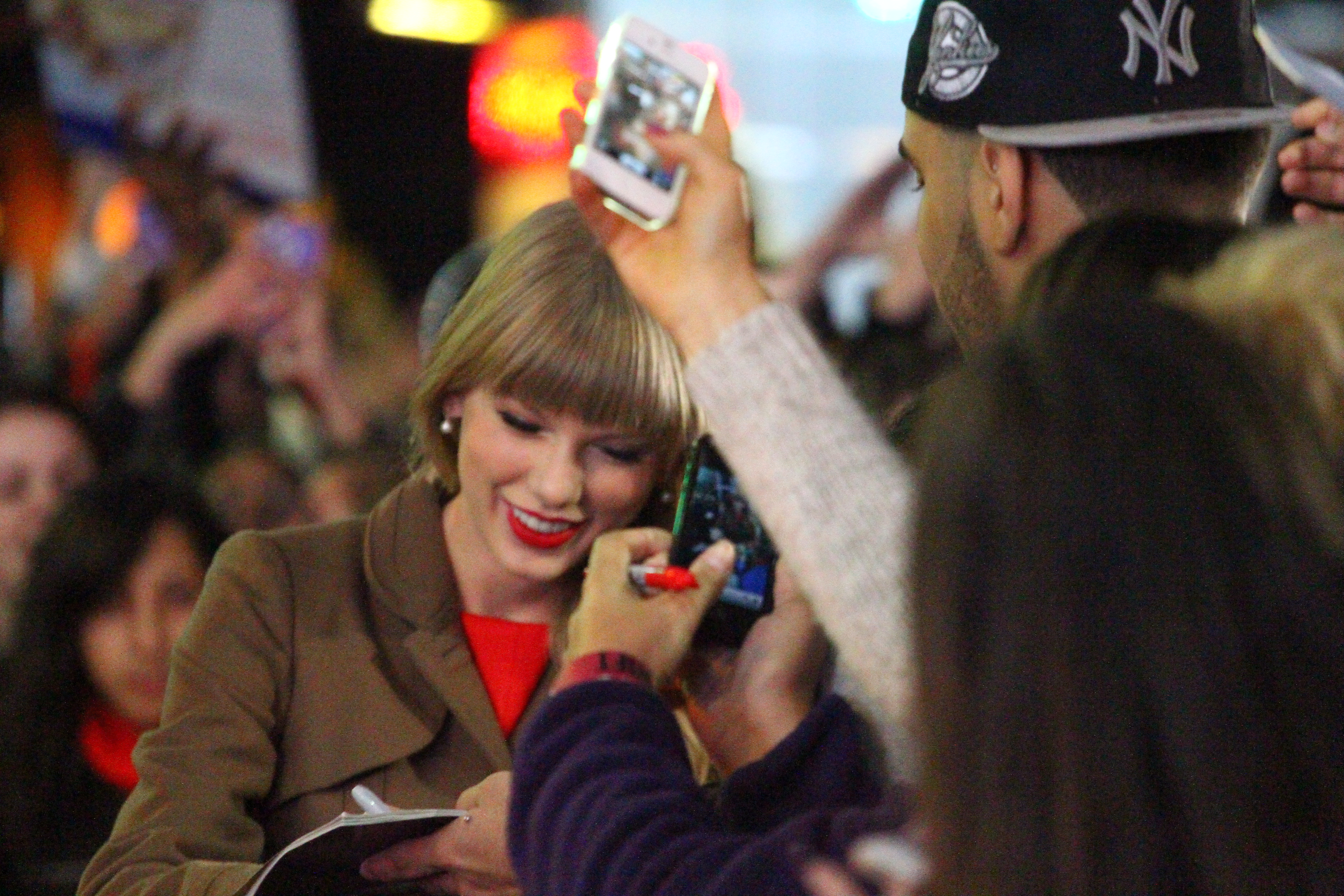
Taylor Swift interacting with the Swifties gathered outside the Good Morning America studio in New York City (2012)

Swifties are the fandom of the American singer-songwriter Taylor Swift. Regarded by journalists as one of the largest and most devoted fanbases, Swifties are known for their high levels of participation, community, and cultural impact on the music industry and popular culture. They are a subject of widespread coverage in the mainstream media.

As opposed to a casual fan, a Swiftie is an ardent fan of Swift, whose works, looks, and promotional efforts have garnered attention for incorporating clues and Easter eggs that are decoded by the fandom at-large. Critics have opined that Swift has redefined artist–fandom relationships by establishing an intimate connection with the Swifties. She has frequently engaged with, credited, prioritized and financially aided her fans, who have offered unprecedented support and interest in her works irrespective of her wavering reception in the media. She cast a number of her fans in her 2014 "Shake It Off" music video and hosted many more at "the Secret Sessions"—listening parties at her residences where she previewed her forthcoming album. The fans supported Swift through her genre transitions, unanticipated artistic pivots, and her highly publicized controversies such as the Kanye West feud and the masters dispute, while instigating the political scrutiny of Ticketmaster that led to the implementation of various laws and stimulating economic growth with the Eras Tour. On the other hand, some Swifties have criticized Swift on her lifestyle choices, which journalists have described as a parasocial tendency.

Journalists consider Swifties as a significantly influential voting bloc, especially in the politics of the United States. Chilean president Gabriel Boric, Filipino vice-president Leni Robredo, Guatemalan president Bernardo Arévalo, and Brazilian president Luiz Inácio Lula da Silva incorporated the Swifties in their presidential campaigns. The fanbase was targeted in the 2024 Southport stabbings and Vienna concert terror plot. Swifties themselves are a subject of criticism, as some fans display disregard for Swift's privacy, publicizing her real-time locations as well as verbally abusing individuals on the Internet who malign Swift.

Celebrities such as Bono, Halsey, and Henry Cavill have openly referred to themselves as Swifties. Cultural analyses have variably described the Swifties as a community of interest, a subculture, and a musical universe or a near-metaverse, while academics have studied them for their social capital, collective effervescence, organizing prolificacy, consumerism, content creation, and interpersonal relationships. Various universities host Swiftie fan clubs. Their fan fervor and the broader monoculture have been compared to that of the Beatlemania of the late 20th-century. In 2023, the word "Swiftie(s)" was added to the Oxford Dictionary of English, and The Week estimated that there are roughly 100 million Swifties in the world. The animal genus Swiftiephylus was named in honor of the fanbase in 2026.

== History ==
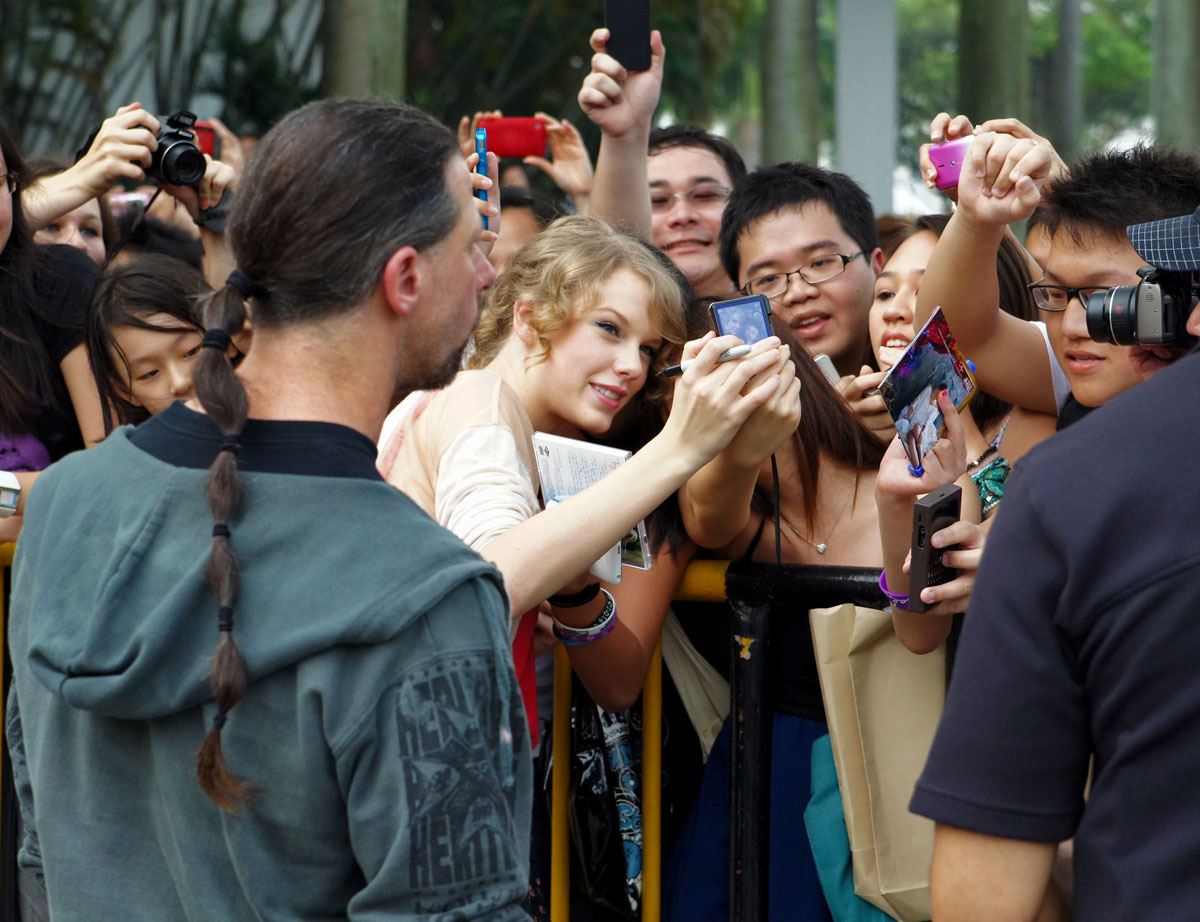
Swift posing with fans in Singapore in 2012

Taylor Swift began writing, recording and releasing country music in 2006. Before releasing her debut single, "Tim McGraw" (2006), Swift had been using social networking websites. She was one of the first country artists to use the Internet as a marketing tool for her music, predominantly promoting herself on Myspace and connecting with listeners who liked her music when it played on the radio. She created her MySpace account on August 31, 2005, a day before her then-label, Big Machine Records, was inaugurated. Swift's songs on MySpace collected more than 45 million listens, which Scott Borchetta, the label CEO, provided to "skeptical" country radio programmers to convince them of existing fans for Swift's songs.

Swift released her self-titled debut studio album in the United States in October 2006. After selling 40,000 copies in its first week, it became a sleeper hit as its sales remained consistent over time, reaching one million copies in November 2007. It garnered its highest sales week in January 2008, with 187,000 copies. This sleeper success contributed to a rapid increase in Swift's notability within and beyond the country music scene. Taylor Swift spent 24 weeks at the number-one spot of the U.S. Top Country Albums chart and became the longest-running album from the 2000s decade on the all-genre Billboard 200. Her follow-up album, Fearless, was released in November 2008 and became the best-selling album of 2009. It achieved significant international success beyond the Anglosphere, where country music was then not popular, and its singles "Love Story" and "You Belong with Me" became crossover successes on pop radio, catapulting Swift to mainstream fame and widening her audience. The success planted dedicated fanbases for Swift in overseas markets such as the United Kingdom, Ireland, Brazil, Taiwan, India, Indonesia, Egypt, and Japan. Her subsequent albums, which saw her experiment with pop, rock, electronic, folk, and alternative styles, helped enlarge her fanbase and diversify its demographics in the following decades. According to The Week, there are roughly 100 million Swifties in the world as of 2023.

=== Etymology ===
The word "Swiftie" for a Swift fan gained popularity in the late 2000s. Etymologically, the word is formed from Swift's name and the suffix "ie", which is often used in diminutives to imply affection. Swift stated in a 2012 Vevo interview that her fans call themselves "Swifties", which she found "adorable". Swift filed the term for trademark in March 2017. In 2023, Oxford Dictionary of English defined Swiftie as a noun meaning "an enthusiastic fan of the singer Taylor Swift." As per the dictionary, some words that collocate with Swiftie in popular usage are "fandom", "die-hard", "hardcore" and "self-proclaimed". According to Dictionary.com, the term Swiftie often implies that the person is "a very passionate and loyal fan—as opposed to just a casual listener."

== Relationship with Swift ==
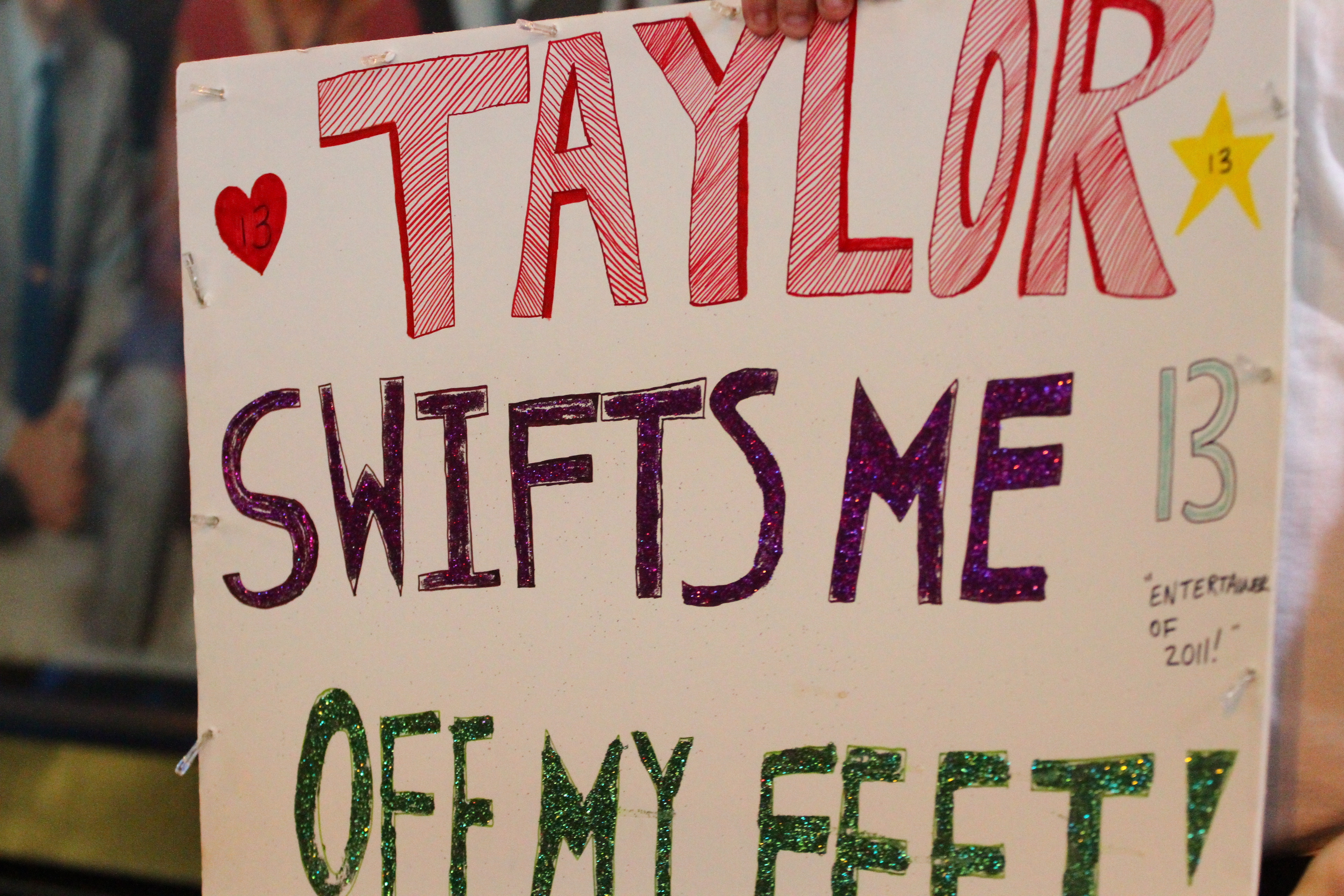
A fan poster by a Swiftie

Swift maintains a close relationship with Swifties, to whom many journalists attribute her cultural influence. To The Washington Post, Swift and Swifties are "all part of one big friend group". She has "revolutionized" the relationship a celebrity can have with fans, according to The New York Times. Many fans feel connected to her as they "have grown up with her and her music." Lora Kelley of The Atlantic stated that Swift "understands the power of the group experience." Her connection with fans is considered unique for artists of her stature; she has interacted with them on social media, sent them gifts, hand-selected them to attend intimate concerts or meet-and-greets, made surprise visits, participated in some of their functions (such as a wedding or a bridal shower), and gifted free tickets to disadvantaged or medically ill fans. Swift's habit of lurking her fans online has been referred to as "Taylurking" by the fans.

In June 2010, Swift hosted a 13-hour meet-and-greet as a part of the CMA Festival in Nashville, Tennessee. In 2014, 2017 and 2019, she hosted the "Secret Sessions", a series of pre-release album-listening parties for fans at her houses, and a 2014 Christmas event dubbed by the fans as the "Swiftmas," where Swift sent packages of early Christmas presents to fans and hand-delivered some of them. Swift has also written songs in honor of her fans, such as "Long Live" (2010) or "Ronan" (2012); the latter is a charity record about a fan's four-year-old son who died of neuroblastoma. In 2014, she cast a number of her fans in the "Shake It Off" music video. In 2023, she invited 2,200 fans to the world premiere of her concert film, Taylor Swift: The Eras Tour, free of cost. Zoya Raza-Sheikh of The Independent reported that Swift "remains at the forefront of delivering fan-based experiences to cultivate an ever-growing following. Whether it's personal invites to the singer's house for album listening parties, aka Secret Sessions, or pre-show hangouts, she continues to put her fans first." Professors Amit Nigam, Danielle Logue, and John Amis of University of London, University of New South Wales, and University of Edinburgh wrote that cultural norms, such as shared online interactions about clues from Swift's tours, songs or personal events, and the specific language that is used by Swift and her fans, binds Swifties together, helping in defining the relationships that Swifties form with one another, and with Swift herself.

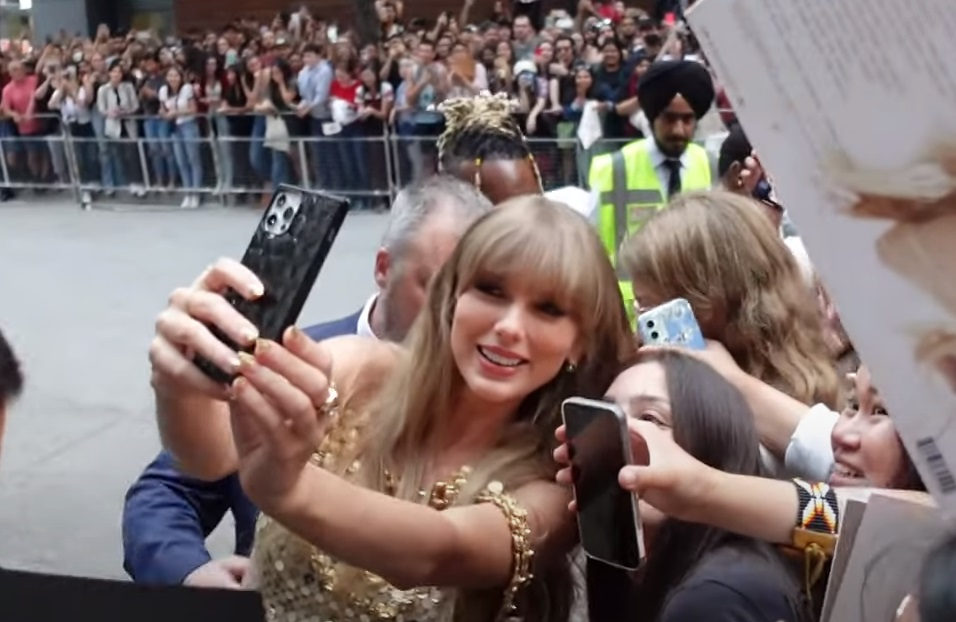
Swift taking pictures with fans outside the Toronto International Film Festival in 2022

With her large fanbase, Swift is one of the most followed people on social media. According to ticketing executive Nathan Hubbard, Swift was the first musician ever "to be natively online." Rolling Stone critic Brittany Spanos opined that Swift grew her fanbase on social media: "She was using Tumblr way past its prime. Twitter. She's now on TikTok, commenting on people's videos." The part of TikTok dominated by Swifties is known as "SwiftTok". A 2024 qualitative study of Swifties credited "Swift's constant self-disclosure and authentic persona on social media" for the Swifties' exceptional relationship with Swift.

The nicknames generally used by Swifties for Swift include "Blondie" (referencing her blonde hair), "T-Swizzle" (after the lyrics in Swift's 2009 parody song "Thug Story" with American record producer T-Pain), and "The Music Industry" (referring to her influence on the music industry). Chinese Swifties dubbed her "Meimei" (霉霉), a pun based on the Chinese character "Mei" (霉) for "unlucky" that has since been adopted by Chinese state media.

Swift has donated to fans to cover their academic loans, medical bills, rent or other expenses. In 2018, she bought a house for a homeless and pregnant fan. Her high donation to a fan with leukemia on GoFundMe in 2015 caused the crowdfunding platform to expand its donation cap. In 2023, thousands of Swifties collectively donated US$125,000 via GoFundMe to the family of a fellow Swiftie who was struck and killed by a drunk driver on his way home from a Swift concert. Much of the donated amount was given in portions of $13, Swift's favorite number. When three children were murdered and several other maimed at a Swift-themed event, Swifties raised over £100,000 within a day to help the victims.

While Swifties are generally perceived as a fandom unanimously supportive of Swift, members of the fanbase have also criticized her a number of times throughout the years. Reasons include insufficient political activism from Swift, such as during Donald Trump's election as the 45th president of the U.S. or the Israeli–Palestinian conflict, and the individuals she has been associated with in the media, such as Matty Healy, who is known for his controversial statements. Swift has also criticized her fans or some of her fans in certain lyrics of her eleventh studio album, The Tortured Poets Department (2024), prominently in the tracks "But Daddy I Love Him" and "Who's Afraid of Little Old Me?" for encroaching on her private life.

== Community and subculture ==
Fan art referencing Swift's speech at the 1989 World Tour (2015) about her song "Clean" (2014)

Journalists describe Swift's works, celebrity, and the fanfare surrounding them as a world of its own, dubbing it a music "universe" subject to analyses by Swifties. Propagated by her prolific use of Easter eggs and "unusually close connection with her fans", Swift is a source of myth in popular culture. Her outfits, accessories, diction, color coding, and numerology have also been Easter eggs. Swifties are known for their fan theories, having gained a reputation as "the best online sleuths" for breaking down and associating various elements they consider as clues or Easter eggs. According to Bruce Arthur of Toronto Star, "Swift is followed by fans whose dedication to her mythology is Byzantine and layered and complex and messianic."

Glamour and The Washington Post termed the lore as the Taylor Swift Cinematic Universe. Entertainment Weekly called it Taylor Swift Musical Universe—"a pop star known for prodigious hint-dropping, whose fans turn every piece of info into an online archaeological dig." In The Guardian, Adrian Horton said "Swiftverse" is a subculture of mass media, cultivated by "years of worldbuilding and Swiftian mythology", while Alim Kheraj wrote Swift turned pop music into a "multiplayer puzzle" involving fanbase commitment, which other artists have attempted to reproduce. According to Sinéad O'Sullivan in The New Yorker, the Swiftverse is "a fan universe, filled with complex, in-sequence narratives that have been contextualized through multiple perspectives" across Swift's albums.

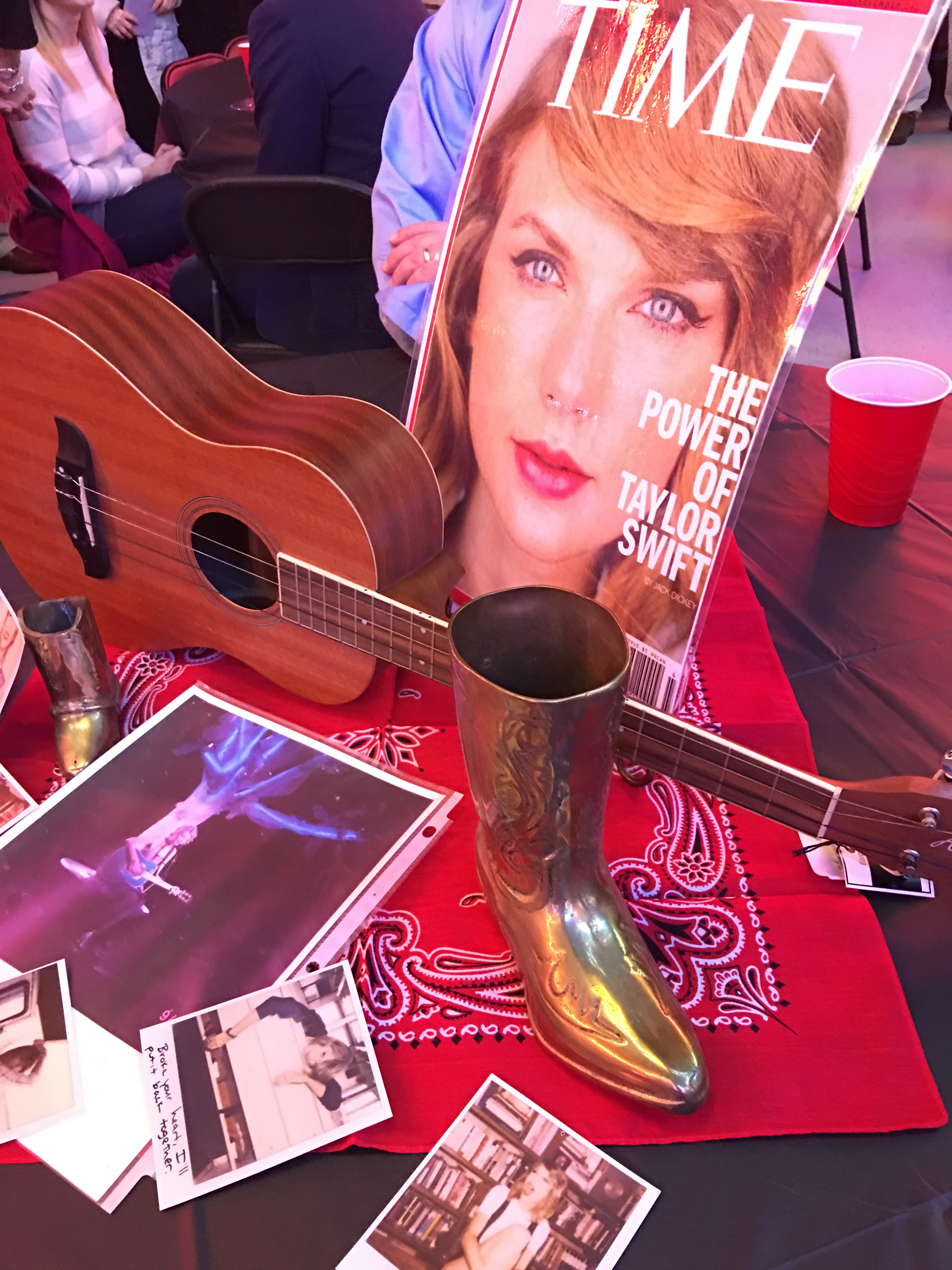
A collection of Swift-related articles at a fan's funeral

Andrew Unterberger of Spin wrote that symbolisms are "inextricable elements of the Taylor Swift experience" and key to understanding her work. To Caroline Mimbs Nyce of The Atlantic, Swift's fandom is nearly a metaverse: "a huge virtual community unmoored from a single platform, based on a world around Taylor Swift, missing only the 3D virtual space to hang out in." According to Yahr, Swift enjoys embedding "clues, hints and puzzles" in her works, social media posts and interviews, constructing a self-mythology that fans believe could have a hidden meaning and attempt to decode, such as a release date, song or album title or an artistic element. Madeline Merinuk of Today observed how Swift's easter eggs, which originated as short messages hidden within elaborate CD packaging, have become more innovative and intricate over time. The critical analysis is referred to as "Swiftology" in the media. For instance, "the scarf" mentioned in "All Too Well" has been a topic of mythology. Singaporean journalist and music critic Zachary Hourihane took the name The Swiftologist in reference to Swiftology, creating video essays and commentary on Swift's work. Hourihane has gained a large viewership primarily focusing on Swift, along with other full-time Swifties.

Swift is known for her album rollouts and promotional concepts, often referred to as "eras". Each era is characterized by an aesthetic idea, color palette, mood, and a fashion style. As such, Swift has reinvented her image and style throughout her career, which Ashley Lutz of Fortune felt aided in broadening her fanbase. Today senior editor Elena Nicolaou reported on how Swifties, who are mostly millennials, have incorporated Swiftie culture into their weddings and other events.

Her use of symbols and imagery has only grown over time, to the point that if you look deep enough into Swift World, her fans seem as if they are practically speaking another language with abbreviations, coded catchphrases and references that only they understand.

— Emily Yahr, The Washington Post (2022)

=== Sociological characteristics ===
Swifties made and shared friendship bracelets at the Eras Tour (2023–2024), inspired by the song "You're on Your Own, Kid". The number 13, as Swift's favorite and lucky number, is often referenced by the fans as well.

Swifties have been described as a loyal fanbase with high levels of participation and creativity; devoted fans in overseas countries such as China translate her lyrics and coordinate large-scale Swift-related events. Their positive reception of Reputation, which was released after her 2016 controversy, demonstrated their commitment to her, irrespective of a tonal shift in her artistry and public perception. Billboard wrote the unprecedented success of Swift's re-recorded albums was further evidence of their loyalty. According to Willman, the re-records' success inspired other artists to "weaponize fans in their business disputes". Author Amanda Petrusich described Swifties' allegiance as both "mighty and frightening". The Guardian critic Rachel Aroesti wrote, "You can't argue with her fanbase, immaculately devout and mind-bogglingly populous." Swifties are a "force"—"a large and powerful group", according to the music professor Paula Harper from the University of Chicago.

The consumerist phenomenon of participating in or purchasing anything related to Swift has been termed "the Taylor Swift effect" by publications. To business scientists Brendan Canavan and Claire McCamley, the relationship between Swift and Swifties represents post-postmodern consumerism. Sociologist Brian Donovan opined, "it is easy to dismiss the frenzy surrounding Swift as mindless hero worship. Yet, the Swifties have shown the power of fandom to create social bonds that transcend consumerism." He praised Swift's ability to "tap into the collector mindset in her fandom". Arthur opined, "People like to frame Swifties as an extreme case, but it sort of functions the same way as in sports." Claire Cohen opined in Evening Standard that there is an underlying misogyny in the way Swifties are portrayed by the media, often male authors, as "some Victorian hysteria; irrational and shallow". Cohen stated that "liking her music is looked down on by those who consider themselves arbiters of what's culturally 'good enough', in the same way as romantic literature by women is written-off as mere 'chick lit'."

The fan frenzy, generally termed "Swiftmania", has been considered the 21st-century equivalent to Beatlemania by journalists such as Jon Bream of Star Tribune, who said "Swift has achieved a once unthinkable monoculture, a zeitgeistian redux of Beatlemania". Shows and television programs featuring Swift often experience viewership peaks due to Swifties; Super Bowl LVIII experienced higher viewership due to Swift's relationship with Kansas City Chiefs player Travis Kelce.

== Industrial impact ==
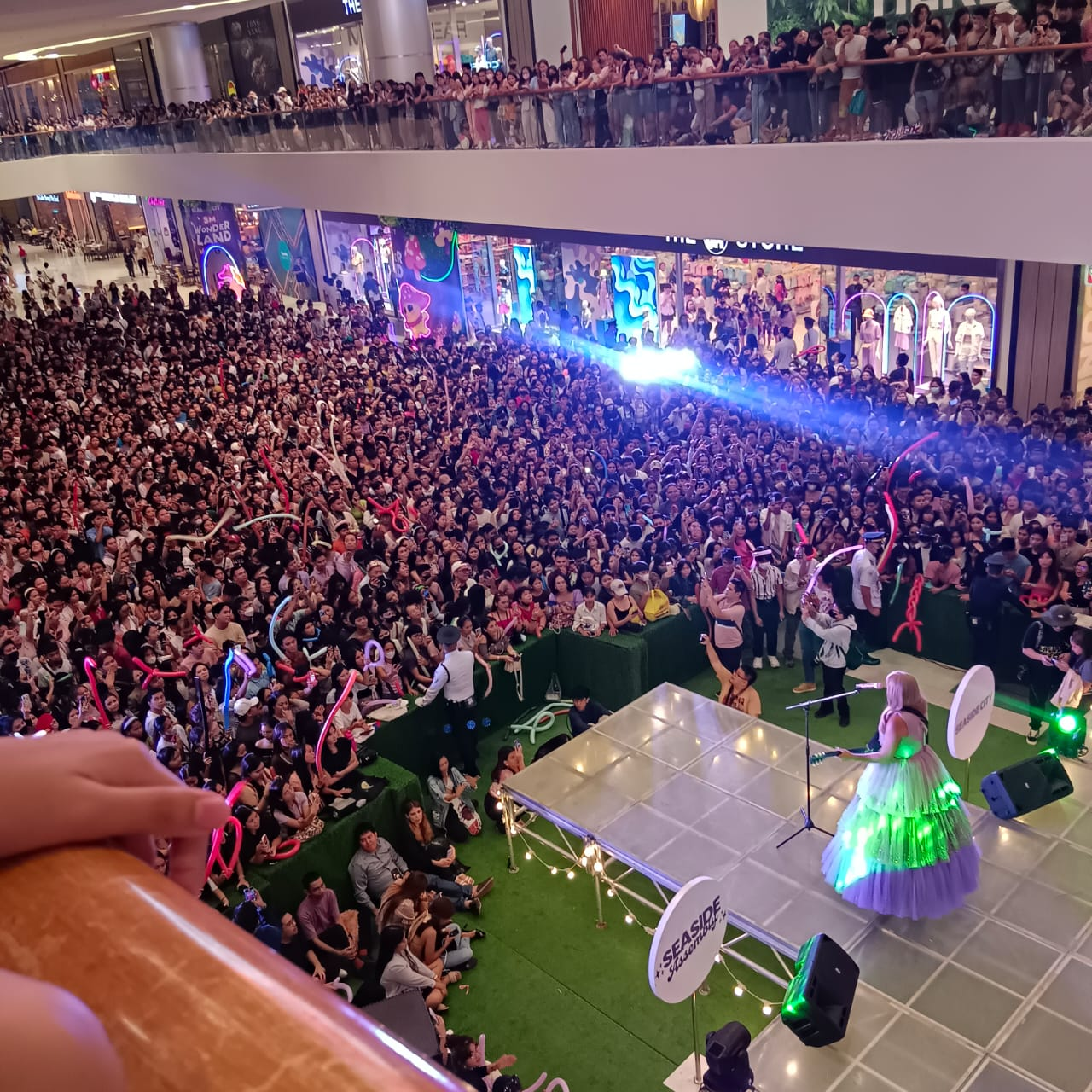
Filipino drag queen Taylor Sheesh, known for impersonating Swift, rose to fame due to Swifties.

Swifties have been widely covered for their support for Swift in terms of her commercial success. Swift is known for her large CD and vinyl sales despite the 21st-century music scene having shifted to a largely digital industry. From 2014 to 2015, Swift contested music streaming services Spotify and Apple Music to regulate their policies to protect artists' integrity. She announced that 1989, her first-ever pop music album, would not release on Spotify and Apple Music, protesting the platform's "minuscule" payments to musicians. Some journalists, such as Nilay Patel of Vox, criticized Swift's beliefs; Patel said that the Internet sabotaged the album format and claimed that most fans would not shop for a Swift CD anymore. Many industry personnel felt that Swift's departure from country music and streaming platforms would impact the album's sales. Publications predicted 1989 to not sell over one million copies in its first week like her previous albums Speak Now (2010) and Red (2012) did. However, 1989 was an unprecedented success for Swift despite the lack of streaming support, widely purchased by fans as CDs from Target; the album sold 1.28 million copies in its opening week. In the 2020s, Swifties have also been credited with being one of the factors behind the vinyl revival. Swift's album LP variants have been sold exclusively at small businesses, driving their profits.

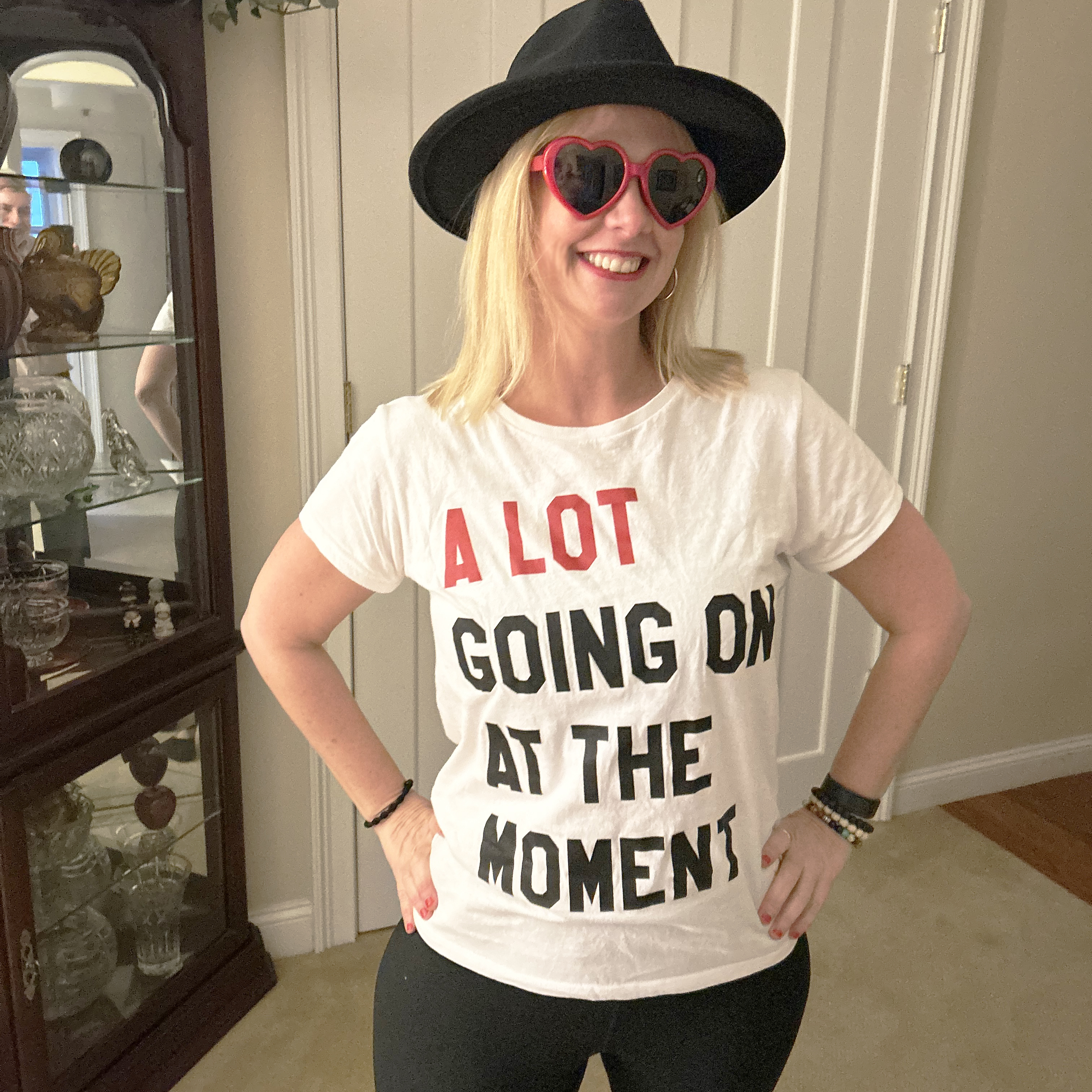
A Swiftie in one of Swift's outfits from the Eras Tour and the "22" music video

Swift's fans increased the publicity surrounding her 2019 masters dispute with Big Machine and American businessman Scooter Braun and drove the success of her re-recording efforts. An online petition launched by a fan on Change.org, calling Braun and Borchetta "to stop holding Swift's art hostage", garnered 35,000 plaintiffs in its first three hours. Michael Jones, a managing director of Change.org, described the petition as "one the fastest-growing petitions on the platform this month". Braun, however, claimed that Swift "weaponized" her fanbase by making the dispute public. Swifties also discovered that the Carlyle Group, a partner of Braun in the dispute, supplies weapons to the civil war in Yemen, which was confirmed by publications such as The New York Times.

Swift's works, including concert tours such as the Eras Tour, are known to stimulate surrounding economies. The economic impact—driven largely by Swifties and attributed to the "booming" travel, lodging, cosmetic, fashion, and food businesses—boosts tourism revenues of cities by large margins. The Los Angeles Times described Swifties as an economic microcosm. In November 2022, the U.S. pre-sale of the Eras Tour was mishandled by Ticketmaster, receiving widespread public and political scrutiny. Due to "astronomical" fan demand, the Ticketmaster website crashed but 2.4 million tickets had been sold, breaking the record for the most concert tickets sold by an artist in a single day. Ticketmaster attributed the crash to "historically unprecedented" site traffic. Fans and consumer groups accused Ticketmaster of deceit and monopoly. The intense fan reactions caused several members of U.S. Congress to highlight the merger of Ticketmaster and its parent company Live Nation Entertainment, and the U.S. Department of Justice to open an investigation into Live Nation–Ticketmaster, while several fans sued the companies for intentional deception, fraud, price fixing, and antitrust law violations. Under pressure from U.S. president Joe Biden, Ticketmaster and other ticketing companies agreed to terminate junk fees. Entertainment Weekly and The A.V. Club listed "Swifties vs. Ticketmaster" as one of the biggest cultural news stories of 2022. CNN journalist Allison Morrow wrote in an article titled "One Nation, Under Swift" that Swift's fans united the parties against Ticketmaster in a way "the Founding Fathers failed to anticipate".

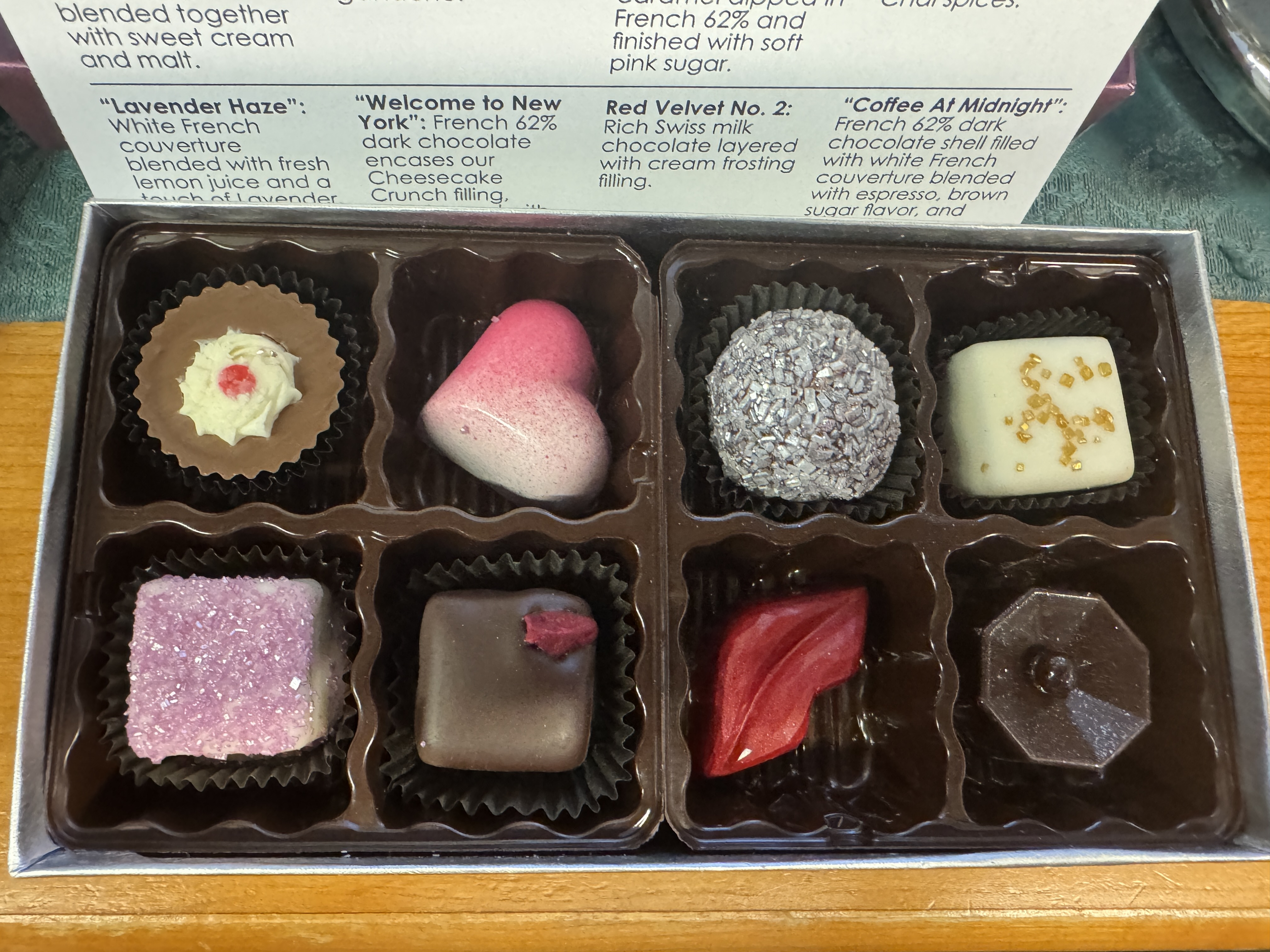
A chocolaterie in Indianapolis selling Swift-inspired candies

Noticing the growing trend of Swift-themed dance parties in the world, industry commentators found that Swift's cultural position as a staple in the 21st-century music landscape allowed nightclubs to profit from her by hosting specialized events for fans. One such party is "Swiftogeddon", which began as a one-off Swiftie event in London and grew into a UK-wide club-night tour that sells out every weekend. American reality television programs such as Dancing with the Stars and The Voice hosted special Swift-themed nights in 2023. Swiftie trends have also inspired various brands. The A.V. Club stated that "usually, pop stars are products and fandom is the consumer", but Swifties are a product themselves. For instance, the phrase "seemingly ranch" became viral after a fan account on Twitter used it to caption a photo of Swift's snacks at a National Football League (NFL) game, spawning a string of memes and causing food companies like Heinz, McDonald's, KFC, Hidden Valley and Primal Kitchen to pick it up for their products and marketing.

== Demographics ==
According to a 2023 survey by Morning Consult, in the U.S., out of a sample size of 356 American adults, 53% of those surveyed said they were fans of Swift, of whom 44% identified as Swifties and 16% as her "avid" fans. Of the fans, 52% were women while 48% were men. Racially, the 74% of the fans were White, 13% were Black, 9% were Asian, and 4% from other races. Politically, 55% of the fans were Democratic, 23% were Republican, and 22% were independent. In terms of generations, 45% are millennials, 23% are baby boomers, 21% are Generation X, and 11% are Generation Z. Journalists have also noted an increase in Swift's boomer and Generation X fans, known as "senior Swifties". Black Swifties have claimed that they often face derision from other Black people, who question the racial status of Black Swifties for being fans of a White artist.

== Politics ==
Brooke Schultz of the Associated Press called Swifties an influential voter demographic in U.S. politics: "the sheer power and size of Swift's fandom has spurred conversations about economic inequality, merely symbolized by Ticketmaster". According to a 2023 survey reported by The Times, 53% adult Americans consider themselves "fans" of Swift, ratings that journalist Ellie Austin said Biden and Trump "can only dream of". Austin explained that though Swift herself is left-aligned, some conservatives still "covet" her, making her a deciding factor in the U.S. politics. In May 2023, Texas approved the law titled "Save Our Swifties", banning the use of bots to bulk-purchase tickets. Similar bills were launched in various U.S. states and the United States Congress. In 2024, The Islamic State (ISIS) planned to mass-murder attendees of one of Swift's Eras Tour shows in Vienna, Austria, in a plot that was thwarted by Austrian authorities.

Internationally, presidential candidates such as Gabriel Boric in Chile and Leni Robredo in the Philippines have appealed or marketed themselves to Swifties during their respective election campaigns. In 2023, Swifties contributed to the victory of Bernardo Arévalo as the president of Guatemala; Arévalo described himself as a Swiftie during his campaign and published multiple TikTok videos about Swift's music and fandom.

Swifties formed the Swifties For Kamala coalition in 2024 to "help get Democratic candidates elected up and down the ballot", with focus on the campaign of Kamala Harris in the 2024 U.S. presidential election. Though not affiliated with Swift herself, Swifties For Kamala received support from public figures and politicians such as Carole King, Elizabeth Warren, Kirsten Gillibrand, Ed Markey, Chris Deluzio, Becca Balint, and Anderson Clayton. After Harris replaced Biden as the Democratic candidate for the 2024 election, Swifties For Kamala amassed nearly 65,000 followers on TikTok alone by July and raised over US$138,000 in a virtual rally in August. As of August 2024, the group had 72,000 followers on Twitter and nearly 50,000 on Instagram.

In 2026, Brazilian Swifties and various other fandoms in Brazil formed a 20-million-follower social-media coalition supporting incumbent President Luiz Inácio Lula da Silva against conservative challenger Flávio Bolsonaro in the 2026 Brazilian general election. Bolsonaro's supporters attempted to disarm the social media wave by emailing 13 Management, Swift's in-house management team, to demand they halt the political use of her imagery by her fans. Lula da Silva subsequently won the election as the first presidential candidate in Brazilian history to lose the first round and win the final round.

== Criticism ==
Swifties have received criticism for certain behaviors. Journalists have denounced the parasocial interactions that some Swifties have with Swift, including excessive interest in Swift's private life. Fans have swarmed locations where she is spotted. Swift herself has spoken about her lack of privacy many times. In Miss Americana, when Swift leaves her Tribeca apartment surrounded by fans and spectators outside her door, she states that she is "highly aware of the fact that [that] is not normal." Vice called the fandom an "equal-parts welcoming yet gate-kept community caught in the throes of idealistic, obsessive celebrity culture".

Some fans have also been reported to attack, harass, or send death threats online to, and dox other celebrities, journalists, and social media users for various reasons, such as speaking negatively of Swift. Other fandoms have accused Swifties of racism towards African-American artists. Melina Abdullah, a Black Lives Matter activist and chair professor of Pan-African Studies at California State University, opined "Why do I feel like it's slightly racist to be a Taylor Swift fan?", later clarifying "I said feel, not think. Kind of like that feeling I get when there are too many American Flags".

=== Gaylor ===
Gaylor is a conspiracy theory that claims Swift is secretly gay. A small faction of Swifties, who call themselves "Gaylors", support and promote the theory, believing that Swift hints at her queerness through her music and lifestyle, although she has stated she is "not part of" the LGBTQ community but rather an ally. Some Gaylors specifically ship Swift with Karlie Kloss, Dianna Agron, or both, claiming Swift dated them in the past. Most Swifties criticize Gaylor theories as far-fetched, malicious, and disrespectful to Swift. Journalists likewise dismiss it as an invasive and baseless conspiracy theory.

Gaylors have alleged that a number of songs released by Swift confirm her romantic interest in women and that she was romantically involved with actresses Emma Stone and Cara Delevingne as well. They claimed that Swift's 2023 song "When Emma Falls in Love" is an acknowledgement of her relationship with Stone although Swift and Stone have only referred to each other as close friends in the media. However, the majority of Swifties consider the past relationship between Stone and actor Andrew Garfield as the inspiration for the song.

In the album prologue to 1989 (Taylor's Version), Swift acknowledged that her female friendships have been sexualized like the tabloid media coverage of her male acquaintances. A January 2024 opinion article by writer Anna Marks, published in The New York Times, speculated that Swift is a closeted queer person based on Marks' perceptions of Swift's lyrics and aesthetics, drawing criticism from Swifties and other readers. Subsequently, CNN Business reported that Swift's personnel found the article "invasive, untrue and inappropriate".

== Academia ==
Swifties have been the subject of journalistic and academic interest, studied for their social capital, consumerist characteristics and interpersonal relationships. Their "prolific content creation, digital savvy, organizing capacity, and sometimes vicious online behaviors" are also subjects of study, as per Internet culture researchers Cristina López and Avneesh Chandra. Donovan distinguished "Taylor Swift fans" from Swifties, opining that the latter are a subculture characterized by collective effervescence, unlike other fanbases. Some linguists termed the Swifties' fan-coded, lyrics-based language a "fanilect". A 2023 network map published by López and Chandra divided Swifties into six distinct factions based on online interactions and topics of discussion. A 2024 qualitative study of Indonesian Swifties claimed that the parasocial interaction with Swift and the interactions between Swifties satiates the fans' "social media gratifications for entertainment, social interactions, and information-seeking." Various universities also host fan clubs dedicated to Swift.

== In other media ==
- Artists such as Bono, Olivia Rodrigo, Halsey, and Camila Cabello have described themselves as Swifties. British actor Henry Cavill remarked he "was never not a Swiftie".
- The animated series Family Guy parodied Swift and Swifties in an episode in 2016.
- The characters Richie and his daughter Eva are Swifties in the television series The Bear.
- During the Eras Tour, the Wembley Park in London temporarily repainted and renamed its Spanish Steps as the Swiftie Steps, ahead of Swift's shows at Wembley Stadium. The Cincinnati Zoo and Botanical Garden also hosted a "Swiftie Weekend".
- In 2023, the essay "Listening to Taylor Swift in Prison" by US prisoner Joe Garcia—who discovered Swift and became a fan during his 21-year prison sentence for a 2009 murder conviction—was published in The New Yorker. The essay narrated how he discovered Swift and her music helped him cope with his life in prison. In 2026, Australian-Indian filmmaker Jon Kasbe released the documentary Daylight, titled after Swift's 2019 song, about Garcia's release, journey towards redemption, and becoming a Swiftie.
- In an 2024 episode of the internet web series Hot Ones, the rapper MGK (Machine Gun Kelly) was dared to say three mean things about Swift, which he immediately refused, saying: "Ladies and gentlemen, you have got to be out of your motherfucking mind if you think I want any smoke with that fanbase."
- The Super Bowl LVIII was dubbed the "Swiftie Bowl" as the American footballer Travis Kelce's first Super Bowl after he started dating Swift; his Kansas City Chiefs eventually secured their third Super Bowl victory. Swifties who began supporting the Chiefs due to Swift were dubbed as "Chiefties". The Swiftie Bowl became the most-watched non-news telecast of all time and the most-watched broadcast since the Apollo 11 moon landing.
- At the 67th Annual Grammy Awards (2025), show host Trevor Noah joked about the Swifties, calling them "an army of Kendrick Lamars".
- In 2026, a newly discovered genus of four Australian true bugs were scientifically named in honor of Swifties, namely Swiftiephylus taylorae, Swiftiephylus amator, Swiftiephylus intrepidus and Swiftiephylus poetorum.
- Swifties were the subject of a comedic Law & Order: Special Victims Unit sketch at the 78th Primtime Emmy Awards (2026), in which the protagonist Olivia Benson and her team investigated a series of Easter eggs, clues, and codes involving the shows nominated at the ceremony, starring Swift as a rookie cop.

== Extended reading ==
- Sheffield, Rob (November 17, 2026). Heartbreak Is the National Anthem: How Taylor Swift Reinvented Pop Music. HarperCollins Publishers. ISBN 978-0-06-344511-6.
- Levin, Olivia (April 14, 2026). The Story of Us: How the Taylor Swift Fandom Changed Our Lives. Simon and Schuster. ISBN 978-1-6680-9294-1.
- Mackenzie, Malcolm (May 6, 2025). The Taylor Swift Book: A Deep Dive Into Songs, Cats, Style, Tours, Lore and Much More. Penguin. ISBN 979-8-217-12881-5.

== See also ==
- List of fandom names
- Nannaria swiftae, a millipede species named after Swift by a fan
- Taylor Sheesh, a Filipino drag queen known for impersonating Swift
- Ashley Leechin, a Swift-lookalike internet personality
- Larries, a conspiracy-theory-based internet fandom who also form a small faction of Swifties
- Death of Ana Clara Benevides, a Brazilian Swiftie
- Super Bowl LIX, dubbed "Swiftie Bowl II"
