= Charmaine Poh =

- 傅秀璇
- Born: 1990; Singapore
- Alma mater: Tufts University; Free University of Berlin
- Occupation: Artist, actor
- Awards: Villa Romana Prize (2026)
- Website: charmainepoh.com

Charmaine Poh (Chinese: 傅秀璇; pinyin: Fù Xiùxuán; born 1990) is a Singaporean photographer and multimedia artist.

== Early life and education ==
Poh was born in 1990 in Singapore.

Poh was a child actress and starred on Singaporean television as E-Ching on We Are R. E. M. (2003), a show featuring three children who solve mysteries. She earned a BA in international relations with a minor in communications and media studies from Tufts University in 2013 and an MA in visual and media anthropology in 2019 from the Free University of Berlin.

== Career ==
In her film Good Morning Young Body (2021-2022), Poh recreated E-Ching, her character in We Are R. E. M. , as a deepfake to explore issues of identity, sexuality, online harassment. Much of her work concerns queer identity in Singapore, where marriage is legally defined as a heterosexual instruction. Her photography series How They Love (2018 - 2019) captures the intimacy of queer couples. Her film Kin (2021) explores queer domestic life while What’s softest in the world rushes and runs over what’s hardest in the world (2024) documents queer parents in Singapore. The latter film was shown during the 2025 Singapore Art Week, but Singapore authorities assigned it an R21 rating, restricting it to people over 21 years old. The film was screened privately and the public exhibition was replaced with a grey wall in protest.

In 2024, her work was featured in the Nucleo Contemporaneo section of the 60th Venice Biennale, her Venice Biennale debut. In 2025, she was named Deutsche Bank’s “Artist of the Year,” the first artist from Singapore to receive the honor. She was one of four winners of the 2026 Villa Romana Prize, the oldest art prize in Germany.

She is a co-founder of Jom, a weekly digital magazine about Singapore.
