= Jom (magazine) =

English-language arts and culture magazine

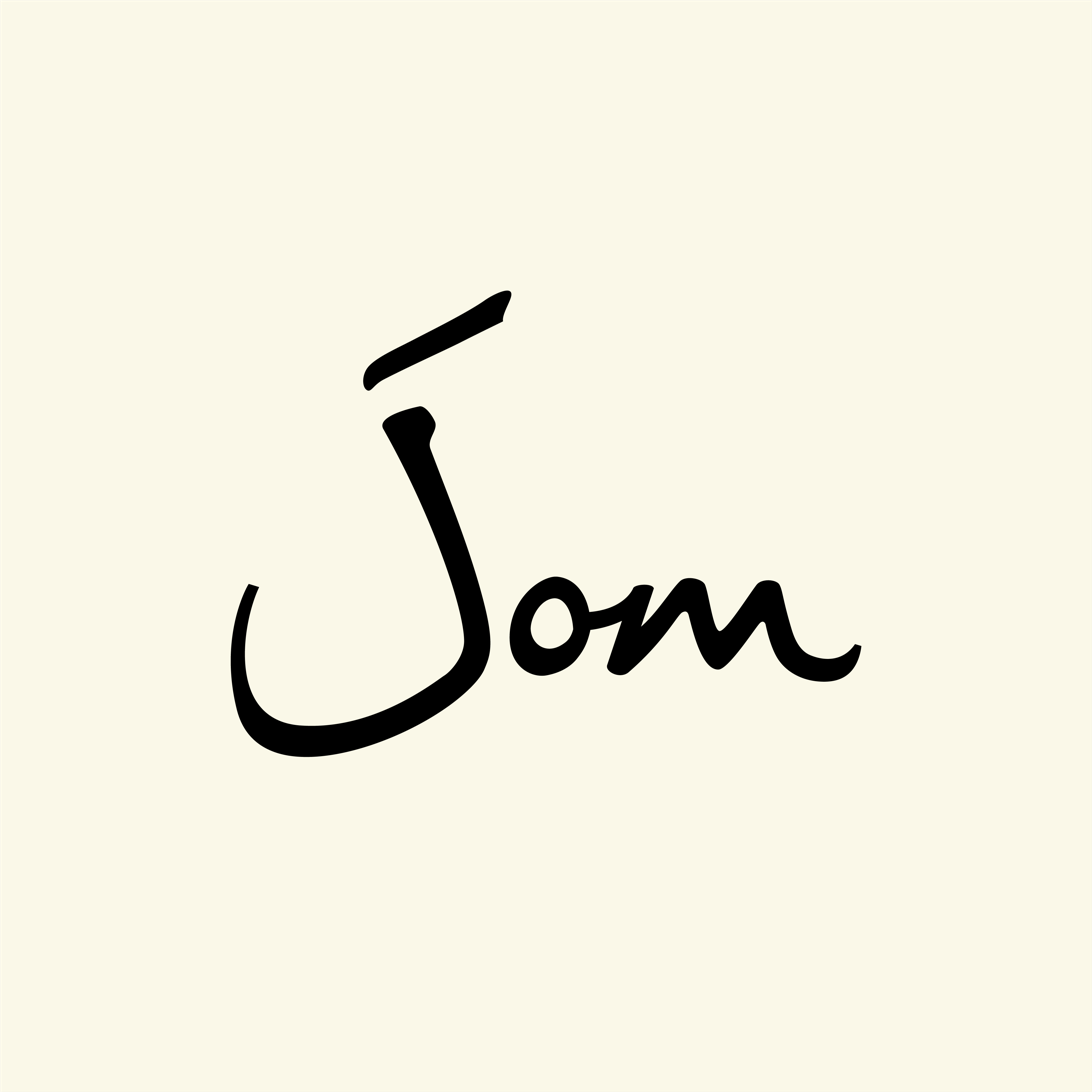
- Editor: Sudhir Thomas Vadeketh
- Frequency: Weekly
- Publisher: The Inquiry Pte Ltd
- Founder: Sudhir Thomas Vadeketh, Charmaine Poh, Tsen-Waye Tay
- Founded: 2022
- Country: Singapore
- Language: English
- Website: jom.media

Jom is a Singaporean weekly digital magazine covering arts, culture, and politics. Founded in 2022 by Sudhir Thomas Vadaketh, Charmaine Poh, and Tsen-Waye Tay, it operates as an independent, subscription-funded publication. The name "Jom" derives from the Malay word meaning "let's", commonly used as a call to action.

Jom emerged in the context of Singapore's media landscape, which is characterised by government influence over mainstream outlets such as SPH Media Trust and Mediacorp. The publication launched shortly after The Online Citizen suspended operations in 2021.

== History ==
The magazine launched in August 2022. Editor-in-Chief Sudhir Thomas Vadaketh had previously worked for The Economist Group (2006–2013) and authored Floating on a Malayan Breeze: Travels in Malaysia and Singapore and co-authored Hard Choices: Challenging the Singapore Consensus. He holds degrees from the University of California, Berkeley and the Harvard Kennedy School. In 2017, his piece on the Oxley Road dispute was published by Foreign Affairs.

Co-founder Charmaine Poh is a photographer and multimedia artist whose work explores themes of queerness, identity, and agency. In 2024, her work was featured in the main exhibition of the 60th Venice Art Biennale, and in September 2025, she was named Deutsche Bank's "Artist of the Year" for 2025.

Co-founder Tsen-Waye Tay has worked as a news reporter, editor and features producer in print, radio and television mediums in Singapore., Her work has been featured at Alliance Française de Singapour, Objectifs and other galleries.

=== POFMA correction direction ===
In July 2023, Jom received a correction direction under Singapore's Protection from Online Falsehoods and Manipulation Act (POFMA) related to its coverage of the Ridout Road rentals, involving the rental of black-and-white colonial bungalows by two cabinet ministers. The correction direction, issued by Second Minister for Law Edwin Tong, was issued alongside similar directions to Kenneth Jeyaretnam and Thamil Selvan. Jom publicly stated that it disagreed with the POFMA office's findings and appealed the correction directions.

In September 2023, High Court Justice Valerie Thean dismissed the appeals. Notably, the court's ruling did not find that Jom had made explicitly false factual claims; rather, Justice Thean held that the article's phrasing could lead readers to draw false inferences about the Singapore Land Authority's expenditure on the properties and Senior Minister Teo Chee Hean's parliamentary statements on conflicts of interest. Under POFMA's Section 2(2)(b), a statement may be deemed false if it is "false or misleading, whether wholly or in part, and whether on its own or in the context in which it appears"—a provision that Singapore courts have interpreted as encompassing not only direct falsehoods but also statements that could cause readers to draw incorrect inferences.

== Position in Singapore's media landscape ==
Jom has participated in Singapore's independent media ecosystem through involvement in NIMBUS (Network of Independent Media in Singapore), a volunteer-run organisation supporting independent media outlets. Vadaketh has participated in panels at the Singapore Independent Media Fair, organised by Singapore Unbound. Jom has participated in the Singapore Art Book Fair as an exhibitor with the release of their annual print publication.

In media industry coverage, Vadaketh has described what he characterises as a "sea change" in how Singapore's establishment engages with independent media, noting instances where government agencies have responded constructively to coverage rather than through adversarial approaches.

Despite its small size and rather short history, Jom has become recognized by other media sources as a credible source. It has been cited by BBC, The Economist and other publications.
