= Taylor Sheesh =

Filipino drag queen (born 1994)

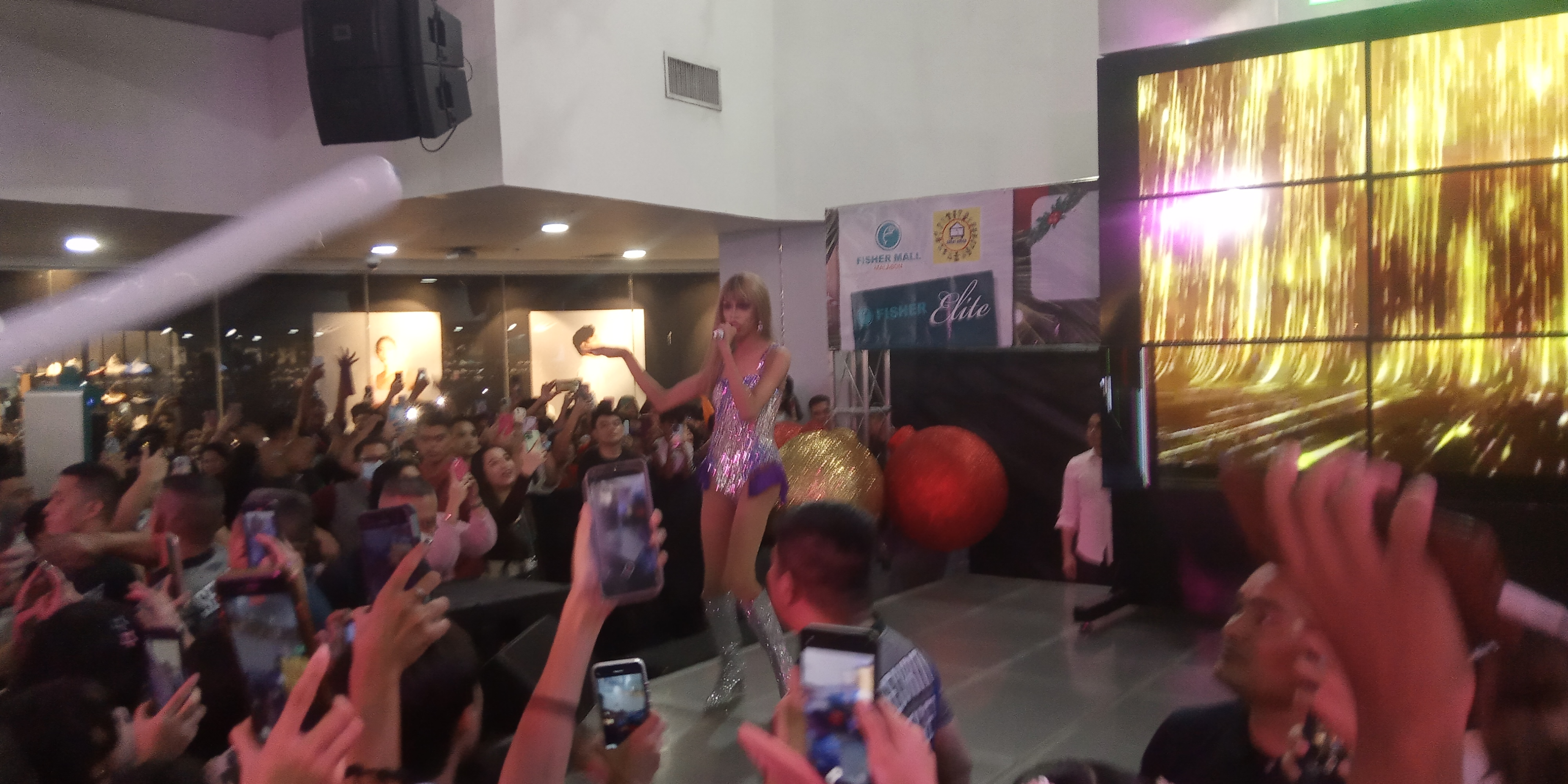
- Sheesh performing at Fisher Mall Malabon on November 24, 2023
- Born: John Mac Lane Coronel; November 29, 1994 (age 31)
- Occupations: Drag queen; social media personality; former call center worker
- Years active: 2017–present
- Known for: Impersonating Taylor Swift; Drag Race Philippines (Season 4)

John Mac Lane Coronel (born November 29, 1994), better known by their stage name Taylor Sheesh, is a Filipino drag queen known for impersonating the American singer-songwriter Taylor Swift. Having opened for RuPaul's Drag Race contestants in the Philippines, Sheesh has been professionally impersonating Swift since 2017.

Sheesh rose to national and international fame in 2023 after videos of her (Note: Coronel's pronouns are he/him. However, when he performs as Sheesh, Sheesh's pronouns are she/her. This article uses both sets of pronouns accordingly.) free-of-cost shows that emulate the Eras Tour, Swift's 2023–2024 concert tour, in the malls of Philippine cities such as Quezon City, Cebu City, Taguig and Metro Manila went viral on social media. Publications have described Sheesh as "the Philippines' top Taylor Swift impersonator" and her shows as an alternative experience to the Eras Tour. In 2026, Sheesh participated in the fourth season of the reality television show Drag Race Philippines.

== Early life ==
John Mac Lane Coronel grew up in Manila, the Philippines. His father was a car electrician and his mother is a housewife. He became a fan of Taylor Swift in 2009, at age 15, while he was a high school student of Sta. Catalina National High School in Antipolo, Rizal. He listened to Swift's 2009 single "Fifteen", following her music ever since, and "memorising all her mannerisms—her moves, her songs and choreography". His first drag impersonation was of American singer Lady Gaga, when he dressed as her to a nightclub, participated in a "lip-sync battle" contest there unplanned, and won the competition. Coronel was hired to perform drag in the shows organized by the club's manager, and eventually opened for a few RuPaul's Drag Race contestants in the Philippines. He started impersonating Swift in 2017. Coronel stated, "I watched some of her live performances on YouTube and memorized how she performs, how she flicks her hair. How she awkwardly dances." His drag name, Taylor Sheesh, is a combination of Swift's first name and the slang word "sheesh" used to express exasperation. Coronel credited Filipino drag queens Viñas DeLuxe and Marina Summers, contestants of the first season of Drag Race Philippines, with helping improve his drag, aesthetic, brand, and performances.

In 2022, Coronel was discovered by an event organizer when she attended an album-listening party for Swift's second re-recorded album, Red (Taylor's Version), dressed as Swift in Market! Market!, a shopping mall in Taguig.

== Career ==
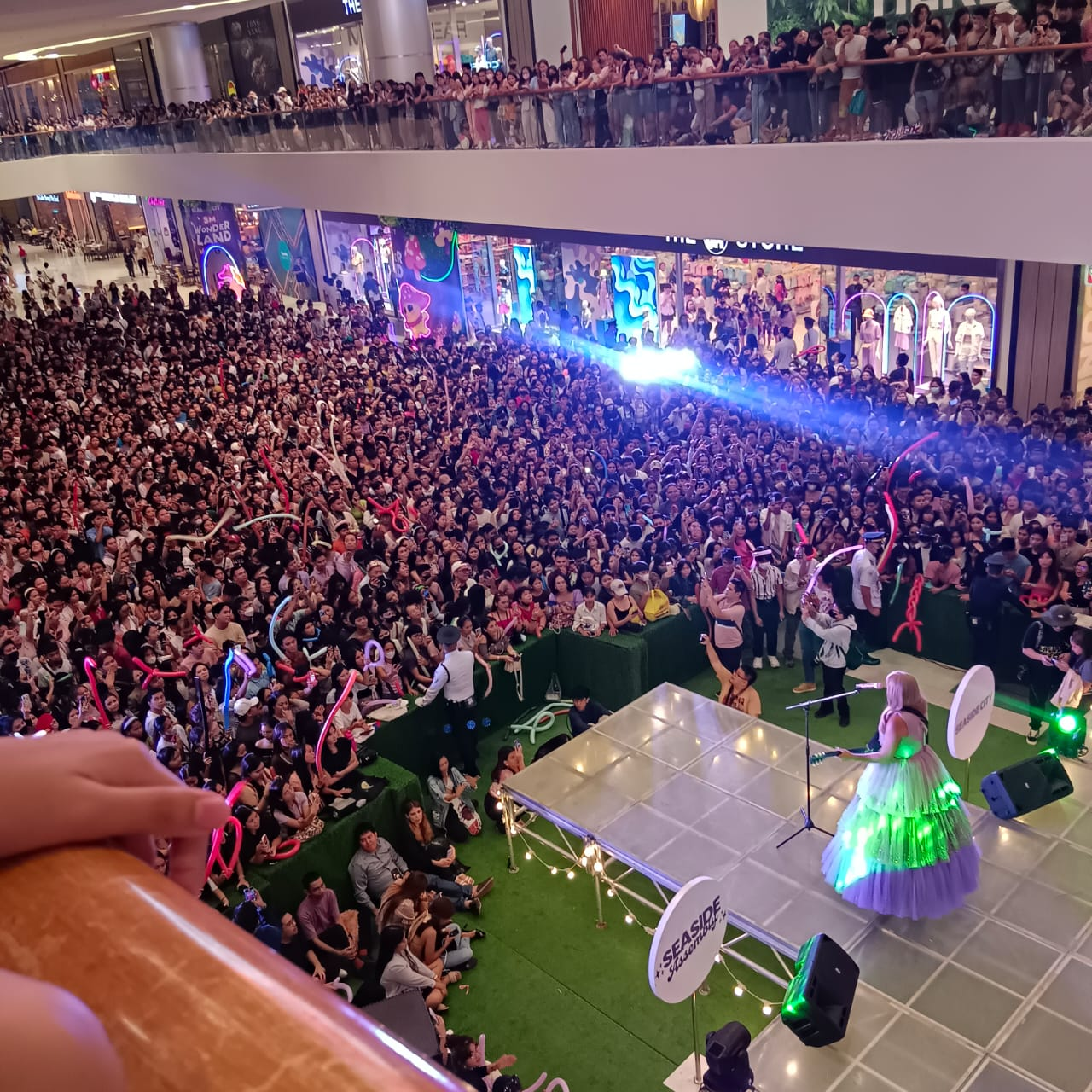
Sheesh performing an Eras Tour emulation at SM Seaside City in Cebu City on August 1, 2023

In May 2023, videos of Taylor Sheesh performing a free-of-cost replication of the Eras Tour, Swift's sixth concert tour, to a large crowd at Trinoma mall in Quezon City on May 21, went viral on social media. The event was reported by American music magazine Rolling Stone in the mainstream media. Coronel stated that the show was organized by him and Swifties Philippines, a Facebook group. In June 2023, American drag performer Jiggly Caliente was criticized for making fun of Sheesh's appearance on Instagram; Caliente eventually apologized.

Sheesh began receiving international coverage in July 2023. Five thousand fans watched Taylor Sheesh perform in Taguig. Videos of the event accumulated thousands of views on the video-sharing platform, TikTok. When the announced international dates of the Eras Tour did not contain any dates in the Philippines but only included Singapore from Southeast Asia, Coronel's performances were described as an alternative Eras Tour experience for Swift's Filipino fans. Sheesh also performed at Brooklyn Warehouse, a large event space in the Metro Manila region.

Sheesh performed to over 10,000 attendees for over one and a half hours at Trinoma in Quezon City—her biggest crowd yet, with some fans willing to snag obstructed-view seats "just to get a glimpse of [Sheesh]." In a private show, Sheesh performed for Filipino social media personality Bretman Rock, to celebrate his return to the Philippines, and also entertained at the birthday lunch of Rock's cousin.

In September 2023, Sheesh was the subject of a featurette on an episode of Good Morning America, a US morning television program. In an interview with Vulture, Coronel said that he makes the Taylor Sheesh shows free or affordable "as much as possible", with sponsorships offered by the hosting mall and a few brands. Food and unofficial merchandise from small businesses in the Philippines are also sold in the shows. Sheesh stated that people recognize him in public areas even when he is not in drag. Sheesh told The Guardian that her performances are "not for clout or fame but to celebrate [Swift's] music".

In February 2024, Sheesh attended the Eras Tour in Tokyo, Japan. She was interviewed by the Australian radio channel SBS Filipino on February 14, wherein she confirmed that she is set to headline the Errors Tour—a free concert at Federation Square in Melbourne, Australia, on February 16, 2024, marking Sheesh's first international show in tribute to Swift. Around 9,000 attended the concert. On February 17, Sheesh appeared on the Australian breakfast program Today. She delivered four performances in Singapore, the sole Southeast Asian stop of the Eras Tour, in March 2024, and facilitated the boarding announcement for Cebu Pacific flight 5J1989, named in honor of 1989, Swift's fifth studio album, bound for Singapore.

In April 2024, Sheesh was physically assaulted by a male audience member during a concert in Bayambang, Pangasinan. It sparked renewed calls for the passage of an anti-discrimination bill that would protect members of the LGBTQ community from harassment and violence in the Philippines. Bayambang Mayor Niña Jose-Quiambao condemned the assault on her social media. Sheesh urged the Congress of the Philippines to pass the SOGIE bill (Sexual Orientation and Gender Identity and Expression Equality Bill).

In 2026, Sheesh was announced as one of the 12 drag queens contending in the season 4 of Drag Race Philippines, hosted by Filipino actor and drag queen Paolo Ballesteros.

== Media reception ==
NPR journalist Ashley Westerman praised the accuracy of Sheesh's body language and stage presence to those of Swift's, and described Sheesh as "the Philippines' top Taylor Swift impersonator". The Guardian said, "on stage, Sheesh moves much like the American star, with the same hair flicks and hand gestures." BBC described Sheesh as "the Taylor Swift drag tribute dazzling Asia" and praised her outfits—"an impressive collection of fringed outfits and bejewelled leotards".

Coronel's life story and Sheesh's rise to fame are to be featured on an episode of the Philippine anthology television show Magpakailanman, starring Filipino actors Luis Hontiveros and Boobay.

== Personal life ==
Coronel worked at a call center in the Philippines. In 2018, he quit the call center job to pursue drag full-time, but had to return to his call center job during the COVID-19 pandemic, due to the lack of stable employment for drag performers in the Philippines. In 2023, Coronel again quit the call center and began pursuing drag full-time, touring the Philippines as Sheesh. He uses female pronouns when in character as Sheesh and male pronouns offstage.

Coronel is gay. He realized he was gay as a child and has stated it was "something his family could not accept"; however, following his success as Sheesh, his relatives have "congratulated" him.

== See also ==
- List of drag queens
- Jade Jolie, another drag queen impersonating Swift
- Ashley Leechin, a Swift impersonator
- Impact of the Eras Tour
- LGBTQ rights in the Philippines
