= Livspace =

Indian interior design firm

- Type: Private
- Industry: Interior design
- Founded: 2014
- Founder: Anuj Srivastava; Ramakant Sharma
- Headquarters: Singapore, Singapore
- Area served: Singapore, India and Kingdom of Saudi Arabia
- Revenue: ▲₹1,148 crore (US$120 million) (FY23)
- Net income: ▲₹−793 crore (US$−82 million)
- Website: www.livspace.com

Livspace (pronounced as li-v-space), is a home interior and renovation company headquartered in Singapore. It provides interior design and renovation services in Singapore and India. The company was founded in 2014 by Anuj Srivastava and Ramakant Sharma and has raised funding of $450 million.

== History ==
Livspace was founded in July 2014 by IIT Kanpur alumni Anuj Srivastava, formerly of Google and Ramakant Sharma, formerly of Myntra. In December 2015, the company introduced its private label of modular kitchens and wardrobes and rolled out services in Bengaluru, New Delhi and Mumbai. In 2016, Livspace launched its home design automation platform for interior designers and announced its design partner community program. The startup later opened four offline design stores with virtual reality setups in Bengaluru, Delhi, Gurugram and Mumbai. In 2018, Livspace announced expansion of its services to Hyderabad.

== Operations ==
=== Singapore ===
Livspace launched its Singapore operations on 30 October 2019. and partnered with IKEA Singapore to offer renovation services to their customers and set up pop-up stores in IKEA Tampines and IKEA Alexandra. In 2021, Livspace opened a joint renovation studio with IKEA in Jurong Point.

The company has since ceased operations in Singapore.

=== India ===
Livspace launched its operations in India in 2014. The India head-quarter is situated in Bangalore. It has two services for the customers, namely Livspace Select (for modular products) and Livspace Vesta (full home interiors).

It has 22 Experience Centres across the country including India's largest experience centre in Marathahalli, Bangalore spanning 23,000 sq ft. In 2022 Livspace expanded its operation to cover commercial spaces such as offices, retail, hospitality and warehousing among others.

== Expansion ==
In December 2015, the company introduced its private label of modular kitchens and wardrobes and rolled out services in Bengaluru, New Delhi, and Mumbai. In 2016, Livspace launched its home design automation platform for interior designers and announced its design partner community program.

In 2018, Livspace announced expansion of its services to Hyderabad along with an Experience Centre in the city. In November 2018, Livspace launched operations in Chennai and Pune markets. In 2019, as part of APAC expansions, Livspace made its entry into the Singapore market after a six-month pilot. In January 2021, Livspace launched experience centres in Bangalore, Pune and Chennai.

== Acquisitions ==
In March 2015, Livspace acquired DezignUp, a design community and marketplace for an undisclosed amount. Later in the same year, the brand announced its acquisition of Dwll.in, an online network of designers and home decor stores. In September 2015, Livspace acquired YoFloor, a mobile and virtual reality platform for home design.

== Funding ==
- In December 2014, Livspace raised US$4.6 million (Series A) from investors Helion Venture Partners, Jungle Ventures, and Bessemer Venture Partners.
- In July 2015, it was announced that Gokul Rajaram of Square would be taking on a special advisory role in the startup and had made an angel investment.
- In August 2015, the startup raised another $8 million in its Series A extension funding round from existing investors Helion Venture Partners, Jungle Ventures, and Bessemer Venture Partners.
- In August 2016, Livspace raised US$15 million from Bessemer Venture Partners as part of its Series B funding.
- According to reports in 2018, the company raised an additional $6 million investment as part of the same round.
- In 2018, the company secured US$70 million in its series C round led by TPG Growth, Goldman Sachs Alternatives and other existing investors.
- In May 2019, the Ingka group, strategic partner in the IKEA franchise system, invested in Livspace.
- In 2020, Livspace completed its series D round led by Kharis Capital, Tahoe Investment Group and Venturi Partners.
- In February 2022, Livspace raised $180 million in a new round of funding led by KKR, which valued the company over a billion, making it a unicorn. Other investors in the round were Ingka Group Investments (part of largest IKEA retailer Ingka Group), Jungle Ventures, Venturi Partners, and Peugeot Investments, among others.

== Awards ==
- Livspace was on the list of most innovative companies in the world, 2017 by Fast Company, an American technology, business and design magazine.
- Livspace was one of the winners of Red Herring Top 100 Global 2018 awards presented by Red Herring, a technology business magazine.
