= Ashley Leechin =

American internet personality and former nurse

Ashley Nicole Leechin
- Born: Ashley Nicole Leechin; October 13, 1993 (age 32)
- Occupations: Internet personality; Former nurse
- Last updated: January 6, 2025

Ashley Leechin (born October 13, 1993) is an American internet personality and former nurse known for her physical resemblance to the singer-songwriter Taylor Swift. Leechin has posted social media content that largely focused on her life as a Swift lookalike, and has collaborated with other media channels.

Leechin has made public appearances dressed as Swift, which she has described as a social experiment, and described the experience as "horrific". A number of Swifties have criticized Leechin for what they feel is an excessive impersonation of Swift and an unhealthy adoption of Swift's mannerisms and lifestyle as her own.

== Early life and career ==
In 2019, Ashley Leechin graduated from nursing school and became a registered nurse. She worked as a trauma nurse in Nashville, Tennessee. where she lived for approximately a year in 2020. Leechin has said she began listening to American singer-songwriter Taylor Swift in 2006, when she released "Tim McGraw".

== Lookalike career ==
According to Leechin, people first noted the similarities in her and Swift's appearance when she was around 14 years old. During the COVID-19 pandemic, she felt exhausted and burnt out, and downloaded TikTok. Her initial videos consisted mostly of relatable content about motherhood. Leechin first went viral as Swift's look-alike after the singer's fans, the Swifties, discovered a video of her doing laundry in 2021. As some viewers noted her likeness to Swift, she created videos inspired by it and using the singer's audios.

In some of her videos posted to social media, Leechin dressed up as Swift visited Target Corporation stores, observing how passersby would exclaim, "Oh, my God, it's Taylor", as she passed. Initially, Swift's fans were amused by Leechin's posts, especially after Swift herself commented on one of Leechin's videos, stating that her mother had made a comment about her similarity to Swift. The criticism against Leechin soon began to grow, however; Leechin frequently sported Swift's hairstyle and lip color, and she frequently posted videos in which she alluded to sharing Swift's love of cats and Grey's Anatomy. The criticism from Swift's fans claimed that several aspects of Leechin's life that she has posted on her social media are direct replications of Swift's.

In October 2022, Leechin posted a TikTok video reacting to the first segment of Swift's Midnights Mayhem With Me, a TikTok series in promotion of Midnights, Swift's tenth studio album. Swift commented on the video, stating that her mother Andrea Swift told her about Leechin's resemblance.

On January 31, 2023, Leechin announced on social media that she partnered with a media company who had secured an invitation to the 66th Annual Grammy Awards. She posted multiple videos about her outfit for the night and her trip to the venue in Los Angeles. However, she soon claimed that she has been disinvited to the awards show at the last minute "even though she'd already spent $2000 on apparel, lodging, travel [and] childcare for her two kids." Swifties in the comments disputed her claims and alleged that she was never invited in the first place. Additionally, Leechin claimed that the Recording Academy CEO Harvey Mason Jr. promised to investigate.

On August 19, 2023, Leechin's public appearances in Los Angeles in a look typical of Red-era Swift caused a commotional fan mobbing. She first arrived at the Grove at Farmers Market, a shopping area, alongside a few men wearing all black, sunglasses and earpieces, similar to bodyguards, leading to people around believe it is Swift. Hindustan Times reported that she was attempting to prank other shoppers that she was Swift. Leechin was mobbed by fans who wanted to get a selfie with Leechin who they believed was Swift and began recording videos of her. Leechin was soon escorted out of the shop she was in by the security; videos of all of these events were widely shared on Twitter and TikTok. She then went to Downtown Disney in Anaheim, California, causing further buzz. Several Swifties on social media commented that the person in the videos is Leechin and not Swift. Swifties online criticized Leechin for attempting to deceive them and pretending to be Swift. Leechin explained herself on Instagram that it is not abnormal for celebrities to use "decoys", and that her public experience as Swift was "horrific" but is a social experiment.

Leechin has collaborated with media channels and brands. YouTube channel VicInTheGame posted a prank video on August 29, 2023, revealing Leechin had collaborated with the channel for an experiment, which was her appearances as Swift in Los Angeles. In September 2023, Leechin rebuked claims that she had undergone plastic surgery to look more like Swift by collaborating with celebrity plastic surgeon Dr. Daniel Barrett on his YouTube channel. In the video, it is confirmed that Leechin has had fillers, botox, and septoplasty. In May 2024, an ad by American fashion designer Alexander Wang promoting a new line of handbags featured Leechin alongside celebrity lookalikes of Beyoncé, Kylie Jenner and Ariana Grande, drawing controversy.

In February 2025, Leechin went viral on social media in India following alleged reports and videos of Swift performing at an Ambani wedding in Jamnagar, Gujarat, and that Swift has finally visited and performed in India. It was subsequently debunked by Swifties and entertainment journalists, revealing it was the wedding of Indian television personalities Ahana Raheja and Yash Patel, and not an Ambani's, and that it was not Swift, but instead the bride had hired Leechin to perform for Swift's songs.

== Personal life ==
Leechin's family moved to Utah in 2021. She is married with two children. She also owns a cat similar in appearance to Meredith Grey, one of Swift's three cats.
