= Chuck Douglas =

American judge (born 1942)

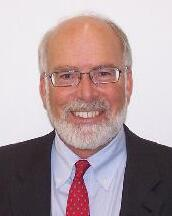

Member of the U.S. House of Representatives from New Hampshire's 2nd district
- In office January 3, 1989 – January 3, 1991
- Preceded by: Judd Gregg
- Succeeded by: Richard Swett

Personal details
- Born: Charles Gywnne Douglas III; December 2, 1942 (age 83) Abington, Pennsylvania, U.S.
- Party: Republican
- Spouse: Debra Douglas
- Relatives: Charles C. A. Baldi (great-grandfather); Austin Swift (first cousin once removed); Taylor Swift (first cousin once removed)
- Education: University of New Hampshire (BA); Boston University (JD)

Military service
- Allegiance: United States
- Branch/service: United States Army
- Years of service: 1968–1991
- Rank: Colonel
- Unit: New Hampshire Army National Guard

Charles Gywnne Douglas III (born December 2, 1942) is an American politician, jurist, and trial lawyer. He is a former United States representative from New Hampshire and a former New Hampshire Supreme Court associate justice.

== Early life ==
Born in Abington, Montgomery County, Pennsylvania, the son of Betsy (née Graham) and Charles Gwynn Douglas Jr. He graduated from William Penn Charter School, Philadelphia, 1960, and attended Wesleyan University from 1960 to 1962, He received a B.A. from University of New Hampshire in 1965 and a J.D. from Boston University School of Law in 1968 with honors.

== Career ==
Douglas was admitted to the bar in 1968 and commenced practice in Manchester, Hillsborough County, New Hampshire, from 1970 to 1972. He was legal counsel and legislative counsel to Governor Meldrim Thomson Jr. from 1973 to 1974. He served as associate justice on the New Hampshire Superior Court from 1974 to 1976 and as an associate justice on the New Hampshire Supreme Court from 1977 to 1985.

Elected as a Republican to the 101st Congress, Douglas served as United States representative for the state of New Hampshire from (January 3, 1989 – January 3, 1991). He served as a member of the Committee on the Judiciary from January 3, 1989 to October 28, 1990. He was an unsuccessful candidate for reelection in 1990 to the 102nd Congress. From 2014 through 2017 he was Legal Counsel to the New Hampshire House of Representatives.

He served as the chairman of the Governor's Judicial Selection Commission from 2017 to 2023. He was chairman of the New Hampshire Judicial Retirement Plan Board of Trustees from 2004 to 2008, and thereafter Executive Director of the Plan. He received a Lifetime Achievement Award from the New Hampshire Association for Justice in 2014 and a Distinguished Service to the Profession Award from the New Hampshire Bar Association in 2017. In 2018 he was named the #1 Personal Injury Trial Lawyer in New Hampshire by N.H. Magazine.

A retired Colonel with the New Hampshire Army National Guard (1968 to 1991), Douglas practices law as the President of Douglas Leonard & Garvey P.C., a plaintiff's law firm in Concord. He is also the publisher of the Bow Times newspaper in Bow, N.H. where he served on the Town Budget Committee.

== Personal life ==
Because of his experience as a New Hampshire Judge and New Hampshire Supreme Court Justice as well as his record of success as a trial lawyer, Douglas is frequently requested to lecture on personal injury and employment law matters.

He is a resident of Pembroke, Merrimack County, New Hampshire, and is married to Debra M. Douglas, Chairman of the State's Lottery Commission.

He is the first cousin, once removed, of singer Taylor Swift through his grandparents Charles Gwynn Douglas I and Louise Douglas (née Baldi), daughter of Charles Carmine Antonio Baldi. Douglas wrote a book about his great-grandfather's life.

U.S. House of Representatives
Preceded by Judd Gregg	Member of the U.S. House of Representatives from New Hampshire's 2nd congressional district 1989–1991	Succeeded by Richard Swett
U.S. order of precedence (ceremonial)
Preceded by Joe Cunningham as Former U.S. Representative	Order of precedence of the United States as Former U.S. Representative	Succeeded by Leslie L. Byrne as Former U.S. Representative
