= Marjorie (song) =

2020 song by Taylor Swift

Song by Taylor Swift

from the album Evermore
- Released: December 11, 2020
- Recorded: 2020
- Studio: Long Pond (Hudson Valley)
- Length: 4:17
- Label: Republic
- Songwriters: Taylor Swift; Aaron Dessner
- Producer: Aaron Dessner

Lyric video
- "Marjorie" on YouTube

"Marjorie" (stylized in all lowercase) is a song by the American singer-songwriter Taylor Swift from her ninth studio album, Evermore (2020). She wrote the track with its producer, Aaron Dessner. A tribute to Swift's maternal grandmother, the opera singer Marjorie Finlay, the song features bits of advice that Finlay offered to Swift and touches on her guilt over not knowing Finlay to the fullest. "Marjorie" is a sentimental ballad that incorporates electronic keyboard arrangement, pizzicato strings, and samples of Finlay's soprano vocals.

Music critics lauded "Marjorie" for its production and intimate nature, considering it a highlight from Evermore and one of the best songs in Swift's discography. Commercially, the track peaked at number 66 on the Billboard Global 200 and reached the national charts of Australia, Canada, and the United States. "Marjorie" was certified platinum in Australia, gold in New Zealand and Brazil, and silver in the United Kingdom. Swift included the track on the set list of the Eras Tour (2023–2024).

== Background ==
During the COVID-19 lockdowns, Taylor Swift wrote and produced her eighth studio album, Folklore, with Aaron Dessner and Jack Antonoff. Surprise-released on July 24, 2020, it was met with critical acclaim and commercial success. The album incorporated new styles for Swift such as indie folk and indie rock, departing from the maximalist pop sound of her previous works. In September 2020, Swift, Antonoff, and Dessner assembled at Long Pond Studio in Hudson Valley to film Folklore: The Long Pond Studio Sessions, a documentary that features Swift performing all of Folklore's tracks and discussing the creative process and inspirations behind the album. After filming, the three celebrated Folklore's success and unexpectedly continued writing songs while staying at Long Pond. The result was Swift's ninth studio album, Evermore, which she described as a "sister record" to Folklore. Prior to the album's release, Swift mentioned that one of its songs would be about her maternal grandmother, Marjorie Finlay, who was an opera singer and inspired her to pursue a musical career.

== Production and composition ==
"Marjorie"
A sample of "Marjorie", featuring electronic keyboard arrangement and Marjorie Finlay's soprano background vocals

"Marjorie" was the precursor to "Peace", the fifteenth track on Folklore; the drone in "Peace" is a sample to that of the bridge of "Marjorie". The backing rhythm of "Marjorie" was composed using an "Allovers Hi-Hat Generator", a software created by the producer Ryan Olson that takes any sound and splits it into identifiable samples, reorganizing the samples in randomized musical patterns. Dessner picked his favorite patterns, looped them, and developed them into an instrumental track. Swift wrote "Marjorie" with Dessner and provided him with Finlay's old opera recordings.

Dessner recorded "Marjorie" at Long Pond with Jonathan Low, who recorded Swift's vocals and mixed the track. Greg Calbi and Steve Fallone mastered it at Sterling Sound Studios in Edgewater, New Jersey. Dessner provided drum machine programming and played drone, synth bass, piano, and electric guitar, while his brother Bryce was the orchestrator for the violin (Yuki Numata Resnick), chord stick (Jason Treuting), cello (Clarice Jensen), and vermona pulse (Justin McAlister). Treuting and Bryan Devendorf played percussion, and the latter additionally provided drum machine programming. Justin Vernon contributed background vocals, played Prophet-X, and recorded his instrumentation at April Base Studios in Fall Creek, Wisconsin.

"Marjorie" is 4 minutes and 17 seconds long. It is a sentimental ballad that incorporates synthesizers, pizzicato strings, violin, and pulsing electronic keyboard arrangement. (Note: Attributed to Manila Bulletin's Punch Liwanag, The New York Times' Jon Pareles, The Sydney Morning Herald's Lancaster Brodie, Entertainment Weekly's Maura Johnston, The A.V. Club's Annie Zaleski, Pitchfork's Sam Sodomsky, and Rolling Stone's Rob Sheffield.) Rolling Stone's Rob Sheffield likened its composition to the music of Steve Reich and Terry Riley. Finlay's soprano background vocals appear in the outro and after the lyric "And if I didn't know better / I'd think you were singing to me now". The lyrics of "Marjorie" are structured like chants, consisting of life lessons that Swift learned from Finlay: "Never be so kind, you forget to be clever / Never be so clever, you forget to be kind". She says that she continues to be with her even after she died ("What died didn't stay dead / You're alive, you're alive in my head"), and depicts the grief and guilt she felt after her death ("I should've asked you questions / I should've asked you how to be").

== Release and live performances ==
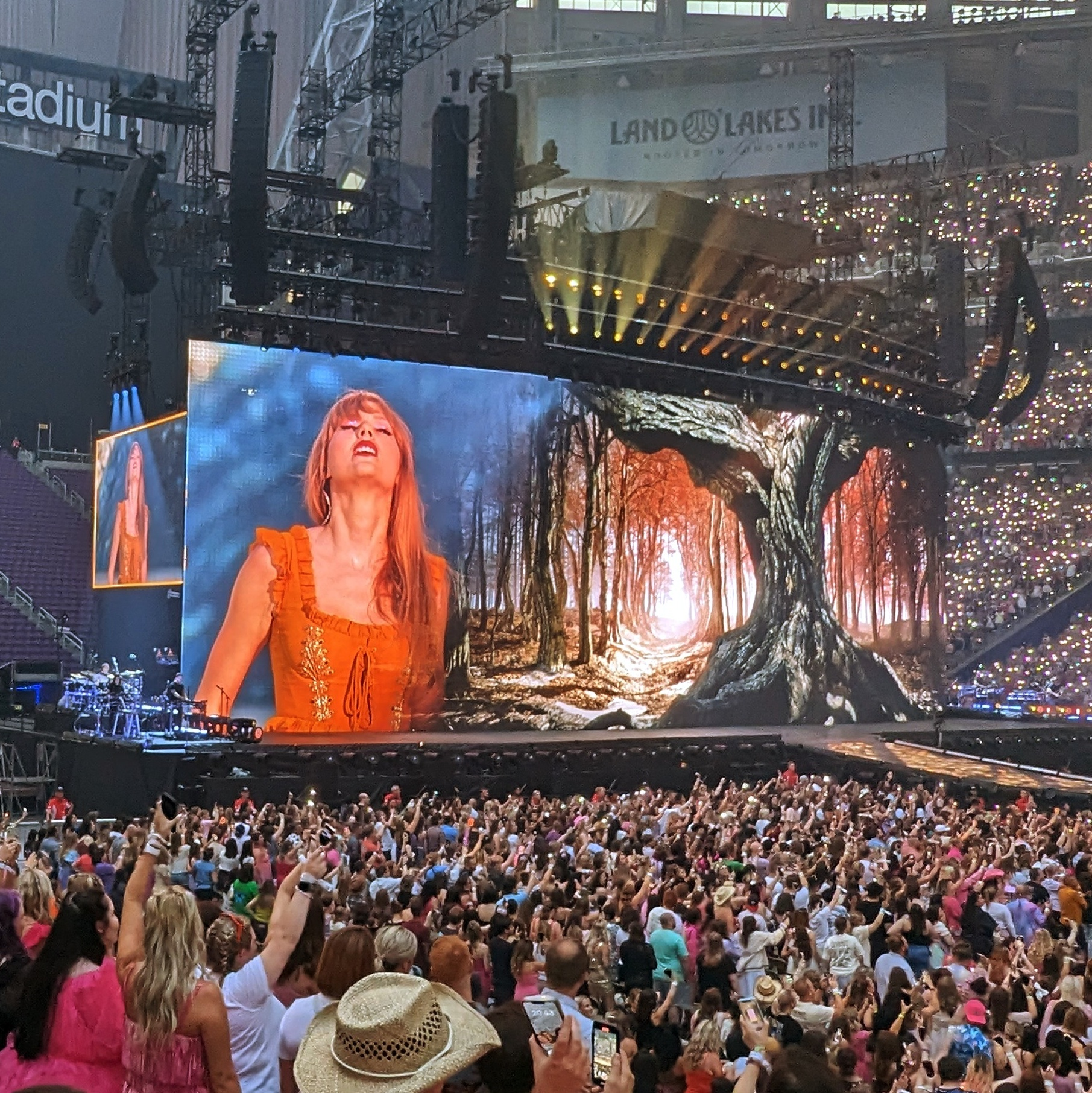
Swift performing "Marjorie" on the Eras Tour (2023–2024)

"Marjorie" is the thirteenth track on Evermore, which was surprise-released on December 11, 2020. A lyric video was released alongside the song, featuring photos and video clips of Finlay. In the video, she is seen at a colonial bungalow in Singapore, where the Finlay family lived in the 1960s, getting into a Ford Galaxie car whose license plate is visible and has a distinctively Singaporean number. Finlay is also seen playing piano with Swift, exploring ancient ruins, and wearing a Jackie O-style dress while boarding a plane.

Swift included "Marjorie" in the set list of her sixth headlining concert tour, the Eras Tour (2023–2024). Variety's Chris Willman and Teen Vogue's P. Claire Dodson both picked the performance as one of the show's best moments; the latter added that the inclusion of "Marjorie" on the set list was unexpected owing to the song's personal and intimate nature. At the Atlanta concert on April 29, 2023, Swift's fans turned on their phone flashlights during the performance to honor Finlay, which became a common practice at subsequent shows. David Wysong of The Cincinnati Enquirer considered the tradition one of the show's highlights.

== Critical reception ==
Music critics lauded "Marjorie" for its production and emotionally stirring lyricism; Sheffield and Dodson regarded it as one of the finest instances of Swift's songwriting. Annie Zaleski of The A.V. Club lauded the track for its heart-wrenching lyricism and "anguished" production, naming it one of her best songs, and Hannah Mylrea of NME thought that it effectively represented the complex guilt associated with grief. Madeline Crone of American Songwriter commended the lyrics and the "vivid imagery" it evokes; she found the outro "ethereal", aided by Finlay's operatic vocals. Entertainment Weekly's Maura Johnston opined that the whirring arrangement and Finlay's "fluttery" soprano enlivened Swift's emotional vocals, and Stephen Thomas Erlewine of AllMusic said that Evermore reaches its crescendo on "Marjorie".

Some critics deemed "Marjorie" a standout on Evermore and one of Swift's best songs. Paste's Ellen Johnson considered it one of the best songs in her discography and picked it as one of the songs that contributed to Evermore's serene intimacy, and USA Today's Patrick Ryan selected it as one of the album's highlights. Rolling Stone's Claire Shaffer dubbed it the centerpiece of Evermore—a "brilliant and devastating piece of songcraft, an instant classic in the Swift canon"—and praised her skills in writing a eulogy. "Marjorie" appeared in rankings of Swift's discography by Sheffield (9 out of 286), Exclaim!'s Alex Hudson and Megan LaPierre (15 out of 25), Willman (41 out of 75), and Vulture's Nate Jones (79 out of 245).

== Commercial performance ==
"Marjorie" debuted at number 66 on the Billboard Global 200 chart dated December 26, 2020. In the United States, the track reached number 16 on the Billboard Hot Rock & Alternative Songs chart, number 56 on the Rolling Stone Top 100 chart, and number 75 on the Billboard Hot 100 chart. It peaked at number 48 in Canada and number 57 in Australia. In the United Kingdom, the song reached number 94 on the Audio Streaming chart. "Marjorie" was certified platinum in Australia, gold in New Zealand and Brazil, and silver in the United Kingdom.

== In popular culture ==
The song was featured in the 2026 American romantic comedy film Voicemails for Isabelle.

== Personnel ==
Credits are adapted from the liner notes of Evermore.

- Taylor Swift – lead vocals, songwriter
- Aaron Dessner – producer, songwriter, recording engineer, drum machine programmer, drone, synth bass, piano, acoustic guitar
- Justin Vernon – background vocals, Prophet-X
- Marjorie Finlay – background vocals
- Jonathan Low – vocal recording engineer, mixer
- Bryce Dessner – orchestrator
- Greg Calbi – mastering engineer
- Steve Fallone – mastering engineer
- Bryan Devendorf – percussion, drum machine programmer
- Ryan Olson – Allovers Hi-Hat Generator
- Jason Treuting – percussion, chord stick
- Justin McAlister – vermona pulse
- Yuki Numata Resnick – violin
- Clarice Jensen – cello

== Charts ==
Chart performance for "Marjorie"
Chart (2020)	Peak position
Australia (ARIA)	57
Canada Hot 100 (Billboard)	48
Global 200 (Billboard)	66
UK Audio Streaming (Official Charts)	94
US Billboard Hot 100	75
US Hot Rock & Alternative Songs (Billboard)	16
US Rolling Stone Top 100	56

== Certifications ==
Certifications for "Marjorie"
Region	Certification	Certified units/sales
Australia (ARIA)	Platinum	70,000^{‡}
Brazil (Pro-Música Brasil)	Gold	20,000^{‡}
New Zealand (RMNZ)	Gold	15,000^{‡}
United Kingdom (BPI)	Silver	200,000^{‡}
^{‡} Sales+streaming figures based on certification alone.
