= Marjorie Finlay =

American opera singer (1928–2003)

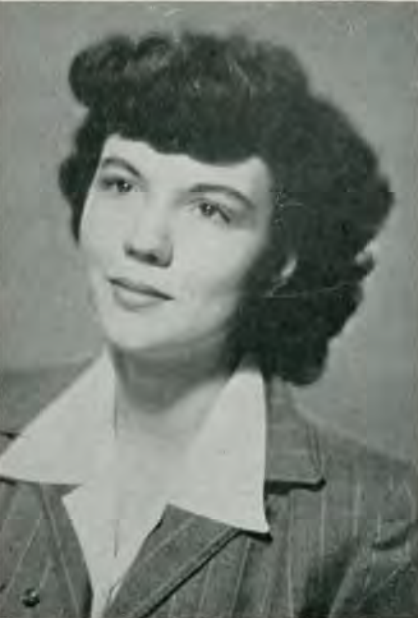
- Finlay in 1949
- Born: Marjorie Moehlenkamp; October 5, 1928; Memphis, Tennessee, U.S.
- Died: June 1, 2003 (aged 74); Reading, Pennsylvania, U.S.
- Education: Lindenwood College
- Occupations: Opera singer; dancer
- Years active: 1950–2003
- Spouse: Robert Finlay (m. 1952; died 2003)
- Children: 2
- Relatives: Taylor Swift (granddaughter); Austin Swift (grandson); William Faulkner (third cousin)

Marjorie Finlay (née Moehlenkamp; October 5, 1928 – June 1, 2003) was an American opera singer and television personality. A coloratura soprano, Finlay performed concert and opera singing. After winning a talent contest in 1950, she toured on the ABC radio network show Music With the Girls. Finlay later had her own television program and served as an MC for El Show Pan-Americano in Puerto Rico. She toured South America and released an album in Mexico. She is the maternal grandmother of singer-songwriter Taylor Swift, who dedicated her song "Marjorie" to her. Her vocals are also featured in the background of the song.

== Early life ==
Marjorie Moehlenkamp was born on October 5, 1928, in Memphis, Tennessee, to Elmer Henry Moehlenkamp (1897–1972) of St. Charles, Missouri, and Cora Lee Morrow (1900–1962) of Arkansas. She was raised in St. Charles. Three of her father's grandparents were from Germany. The Moehlenkamp family were practicing and devout Catholics.

In 1948, Finlay performed at Mexico Senior High School as a soloist in the Lindenwood Vesper Choir. She earned her Bachelor of Music from Lindenwood University in 1949. Finlay was in Mu Phi Epsilon, a professional music sorority.

== Career ==
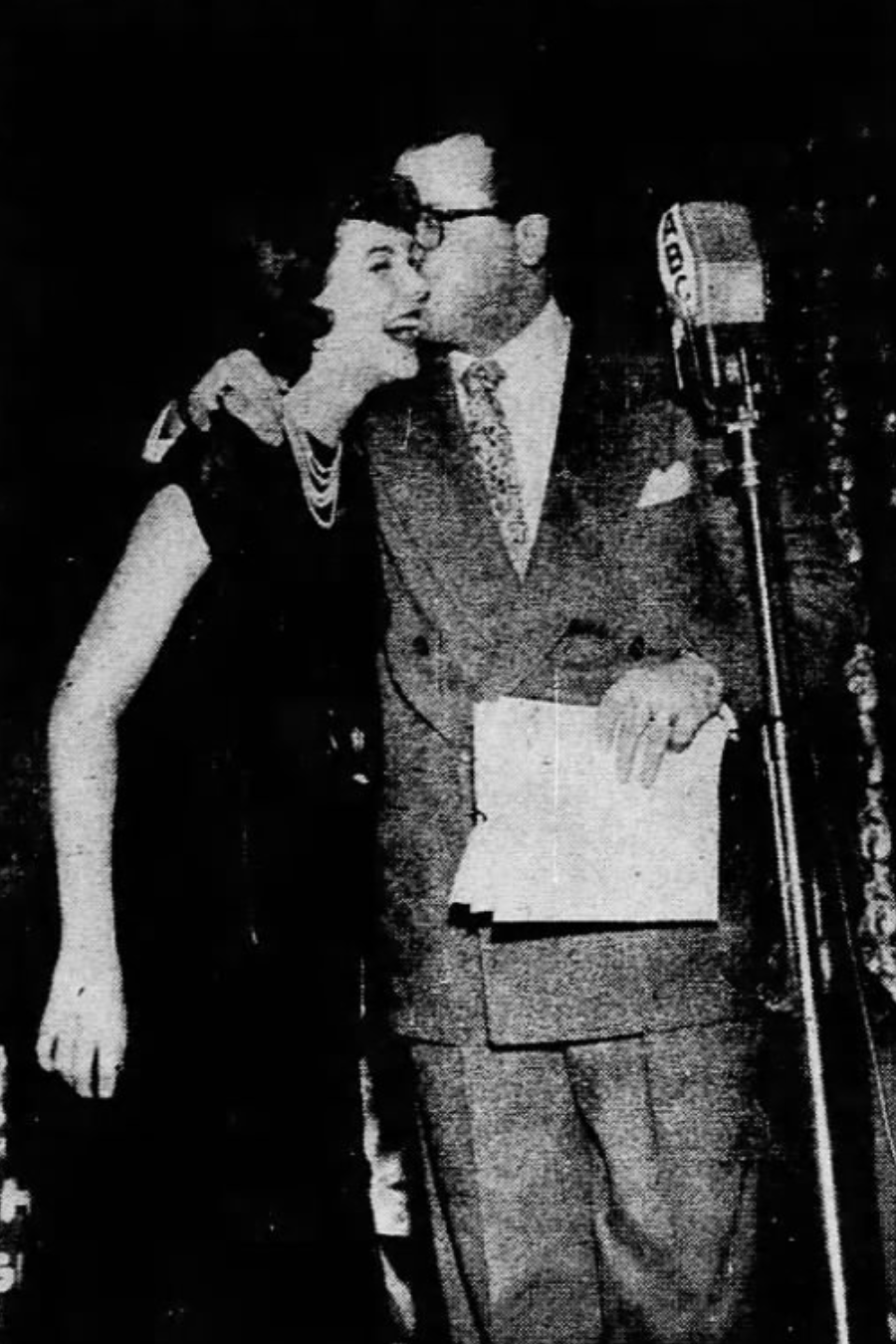
Finlay with Hal Friedricks in February 1950 after winning the ABC Music With the Girls talent contest

Finlay was a singer in the St. Louis Symphony Orchestra's pop concert at Kiel Auditorium. She was also a singer at the San Juan supper club. In 1950, Finlay was working as a receptionist at Boatmen's National Bank in St. Louis. She won a talent contest on the ABC network show Music With the Girls. This awarded her a radio spot and she toured on the network radio show for 15 months. During the summer of 1951, Finlay studied at the Berkshire Music Center and then in New York City on the advice of musician Edwin McArthur. Moving to Puerto Rico, Finlay had her own television program and performed in concerts, operas, and supper clubs, including a two-week stint at the Caribe Hilton Hotel.

Finlay was the mistress of ceremonies for El Show Pan-Americano on APA-TV in Santurce, Puerto Rico. She was active in the Pro Arte Societies, a civic music organization. Her Spanish was reportedly "bad" enough to be funny to her audiences. Her television show ran six nights a week for 17 months. In 1962, Finlay performed at a Kiel Auditorium Pop Concert. Her performance included "Fanciulla È Sbocciato L'Amore" from La rondine and "Jewel song" in addition to pop songs.

== Personal life ==
She married Robert Finlay, president of Raymond Construction Company, on March 22, 1952, in Palm Beach, Florida. Finlay was the son of Lancelot George Finlay, of Scottish descent, and Eleanor Mayer. After her marriage, Finlay and her husband moved to Havana, Cuba, where his office was located before relocating to Puerto Rico due to political unrest. They moved to Caracas before returning to Santurce, Puerto Rico, with their children. Finlay gave birth to Alison Finlay in 1957, and then to Andrea Gardner Finlay in 1958, who later became the mother of Taylor Swift. American novelist William Faulkner is also Finlay's third cousin.

In the 1960s, the Finlay family moved to Singapore for Robert's work and lived there for a few years. In November 1968, Marjorie performed for five nights as the soprano lead in the opera The Bartered Bride (by Czech composer Bedřich Smetana) at the Victoria Theatre in Singapore.

Robert died on April 24, 2003 aged 82.

== Death and legacy ==
Finlay died from undisclosed causes on June 1, 2003, in Reading, Pennsylvania, at the age of 74.

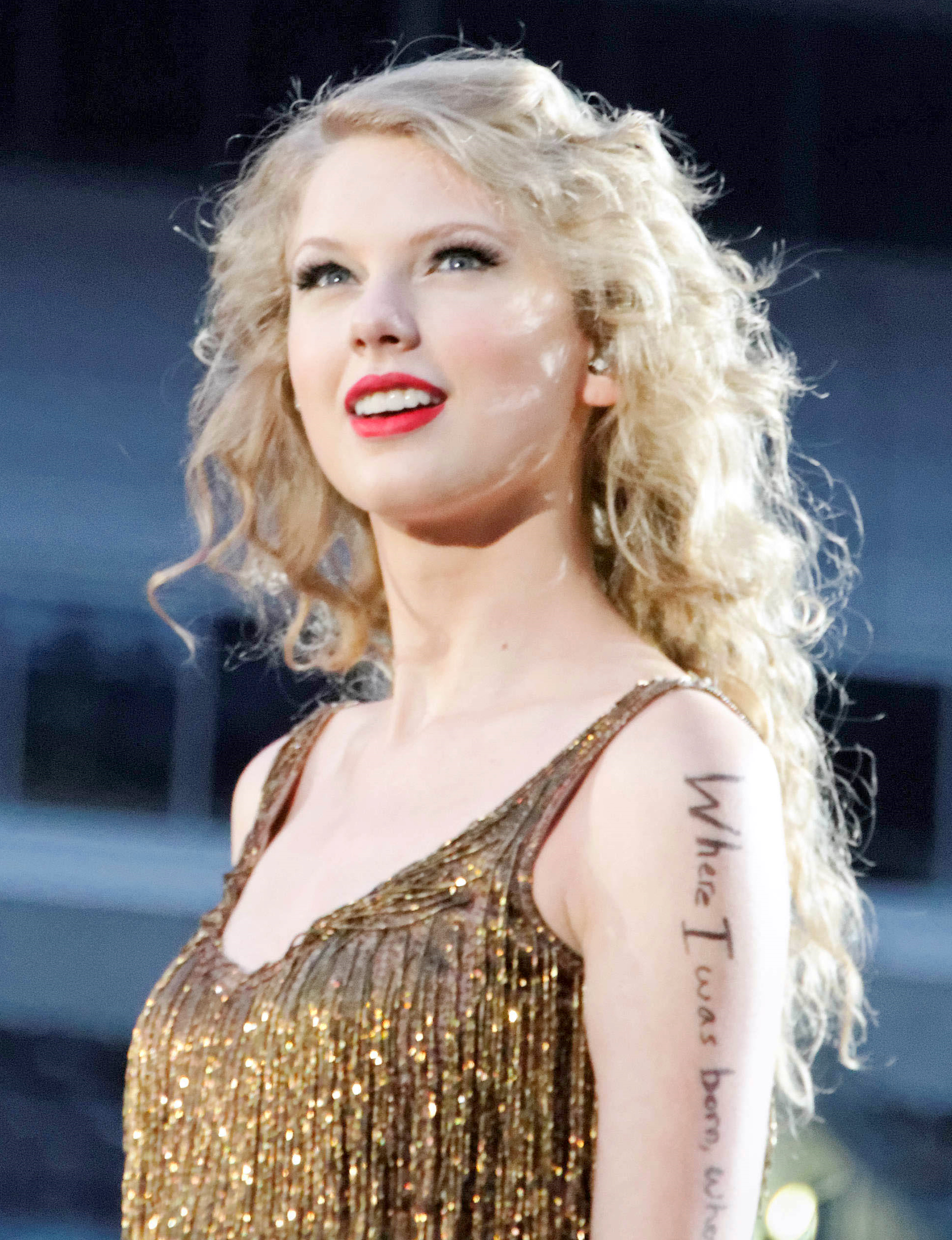
Finlay's granddaughter, Taylor Swift, on her Speak Now World Tour in 2011. Swift has credited Finlay for inspiring her to pursue a music career.

Taylor Swift, her granddaughter, cited Finlay for inspiring her to pursue a career in music. The character Swift portrayed in the 2015 music video for "Wildest Dreams" was inspired by Finlay. In 2020, Swift released the song "Marjorie" from her ninth studio album Evermore; Swift credited her grandmother with backing vocals which were sampled in the track. The lyric video includes photos and videos of Finlay, some of which depict Finlay with a young Swift. In 2022, Swift included a photograph of Finlay in the music video for "Anti-Hero".

When Swift re-recorded her third studio album, Speak Now, she released a vault track (a song not published on the original album) called "Timeless". The lyric video included various photos of Finlay and her husband, along with photos of Swift's paternal grandparents, Rose and Archie Dean Swift.

Swift sang a shortened version of "Marjorie" during The Eras Tour. Fans made it a tradition to turn their phones' flashlights on, or hold up photographs of Finlay, while Swift sang the song.

== Awards and honors ==
Year	Title	Notes	Ref.
1949	$200 scholarship (equivalent to $2,706 in 2025)	National music contest hosted by the magazine Music News and the Metropolitan School of Music in Chicago	
1950	Talent contest on the ABC network show Music With the Girls	Winner	
1961	Outstanding graduate with a certificate of merit	Given by her alma mater Lindenwood College	
1962	Honorary captain in the Puerto Rico Air National Guard	Guardsmen nicknamed her "madrina" (godmother)	
