= Charles Carmine Antonio Baldi Jr. =

American politician (1890–1962)

Carmine Charles Antonio Baldi Jr.

Member of the Pennsylvania House of Representatives
- In office 1923–1936

Personal details
- Born: December 16, 1890 Manayunk, Philadelphia
- Died: February 5, 1962 (aged 71) Philadelphia, Pennsylvania
- Party: Republican
- Spouse: Gladys Belle McCarthy
- Parents: Charles Carmine Antonio Baldi (father); Louisa Eurindine Sobernheimer (mother)
- Relatives: Joseph F.M. Baldi (brother)

Charles Carmine Antonio Baldi Jr. (December 16, 1890 - February 5, 1962) was an American politician who served as a member of the Pennsylvania House of Representatives.

== Biography ==
Baldi was born on December 16, 1890, in Manayunk, Philadelphia County, Pennsylvania, the son of Louisa Eurindine (née Sobernheimer) and Carmine Charles Antonio Baldi. In 1910, he graduated from Boys Central High School and later attended the University of Pennsylvania. In 1914, he was elected to the Philadelphia City Council where he served until 1916. In 1917, he was elected as a Republican to the Pennsylvania House of Representatives and served 9 consecutive terms. In 1936, he was unsuccessful in his reelection campaign.

On February 5, 1962, Baldi died in Philadelphia and was interred at Westminster Cemetery in Bala Cynwyd.
