= Braking for Whales =

- Film poster
- Directed by: Sean McEwen
- Written by: Sean McEwen; Tammin Sursok
- Produced by: Sean McEwen; Tammin Sursok; Cassidy Lunnen
- Starring: Tammin Sursok; Tom Felton
- Cinematography: Justin Henning
- Edited by: Andrew S. Eisen
- Music by: Jason Soudah
- Production companies: Narrator Entertainment; Charlie Baby Productions
- Distributed by: Gravitas Ventures
- Release dates: September 20, 2019 (Boston Film Festival}); April 24, 2020 (Digital Release)
- Running time: 103 minutes
- Country: United States
- Language: English

Braking for Whales is a 2019 American comedy drama film directed by Sean McEwen and starring Tammin Sursok and Tom Felton. Sursok co-wrote the screenplay with McEwen.

== Cast ==
- Tammin Sursok as Star Walker
- Addie Hoppers as Young Star
- Tom Felton as Brandon Walker
- Wendi McLendon-Covey as Aunt Jackie Hillhouse
- David Koechner as Uncle Randall Hillhouse
- Austin Swift as J.T.
- Carrie Clifford as Park Ranger
- Darron Dunbar as Ira Rhodes
- Dylan Sandifer as Little Pepe
- Brent Mendenhall as George W. Bush

== Release ==
The film's initial release was September 20, 2019 at the Boston Film Festival. Then it was released on VOD and digital platforms on April 24, 2020.

== Reception ==
Tara McNamara of Common Sense Media awarded the film three stars out of five. Peter Sobczynski of RogerEbert.com gave the film one star.
