= Joseph F.M. Baldi =

American politician

Member of the Pennsylvania House of Representatives
- In office 1929–1933

Personal details
- Born: May 11, 1893 Philadelphia
- Died: November 23, 1970 (aged 77) Philadelphia, Pennsylvania
- Party: Republican
- Parent(s): Louisa Eurindine Sobernheimer; Charles Carmine Antonio Baldi
- Relatives: Charles Carmine Antonio Baldi Jr. (brother)

Joseph F.M. Baldi (May 11, 1893 - November 23, 1970) was an American politician who served as a member of the Pennsylvania House of Representatives.

== Biography ==
Baldi was born on May 11, 1893, in Philadelphia, Pennsylvania, the son of Louisa Eurindine (née Sobernheimer) and Carmine Charles Antonio Baldi. In 1912, he graduated from Boys Central High School and in 1916, graduated with a B.S. in economics from the University of Pennsylvania. He later attended the University of Pennsylvania Law School before joining the U.S. Army during World War I. He worked as an attorney and a prison inspector for Philadelphia County (1923-1924). In 1929, he was elected as a Republican to the Pennsylvania House of Representatives and served an additional term until 1933.

On November 23, 1970, Baldi died in Philadelphia and was interred at Westminster Cemetery in Bala Cynwyd, Pennsylvania.
