= Charles C. A. Baldi =

Italian-American businessman (1862–1930)

Charles C.A. Baldi
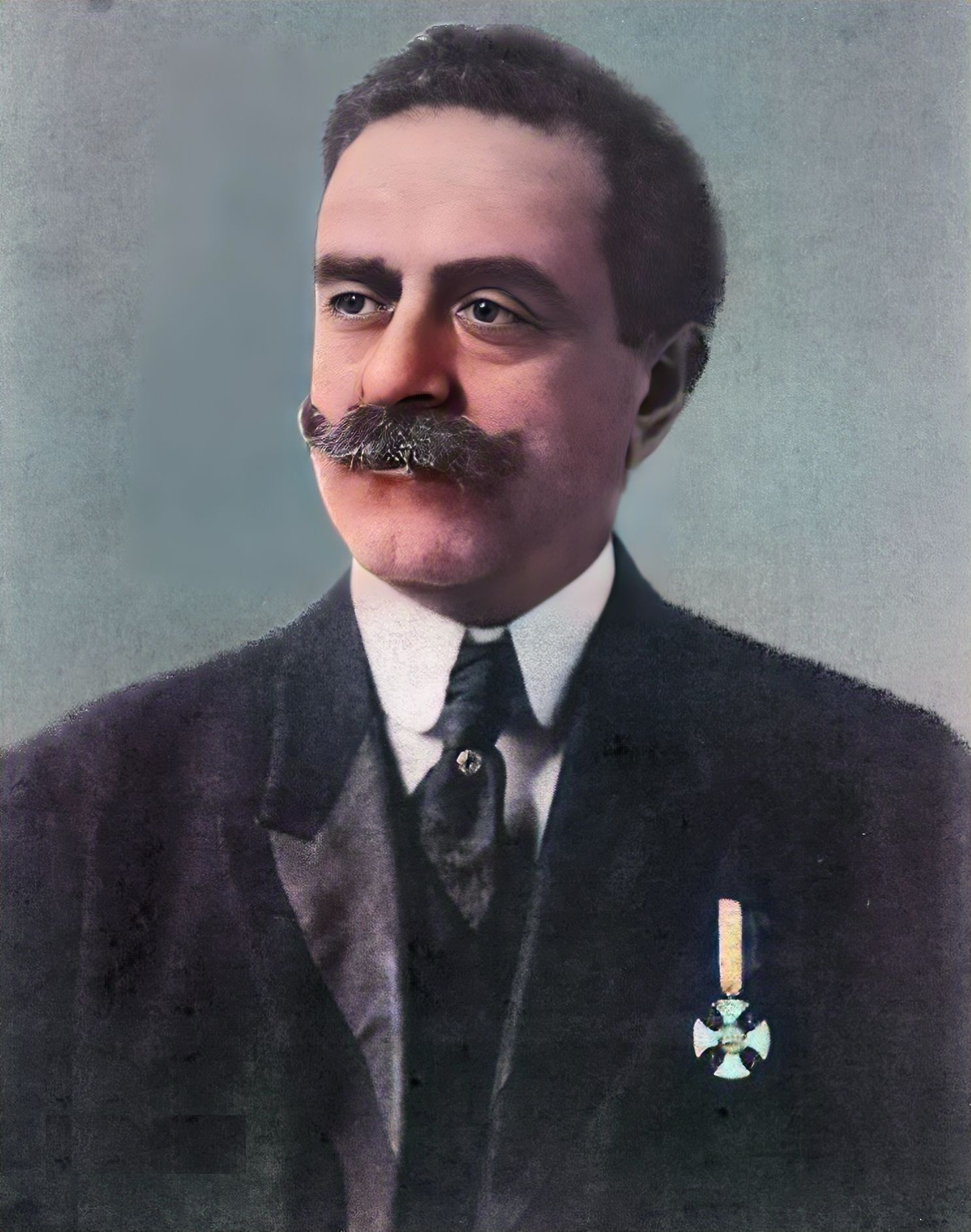
- Born: Charles Carmine Antonio Baldi; December 2, 1862; Castelnuovo Cilento, Kingdom of Italy
- Died: December 28, 1930 (aged 68); Philadelphia, Pennsylvania, U.S.
- Citizenship: American
- Known for: Public service
- Spouse: Louisa Eurindine Sobernheimer
- Children: 7, including Charles Carmine Antonio Baldi Jr. and Joseph F.M. Baldi
- Family: Taylor Swift (great-great-granddaughter); Chuck Douglas (great-grandson); Austin Swift (great-great-grandson)

Charles Carmine Antonio Baldi (December 2, 1862 – December 28, 1930) was an Italian-American merchant, banker, newspaper publisher, entrepreneur and philanthropist who lived in Philadelphia, Pennsylvania.

He immigrated from Italy at age 14 and pursued a career that gained him recognition in the early 1900s as a prominent leader among the growing population of American citizens of Italian descent. Baldi further achieved strong relationships with the existing American political and business communities in the greater Philadelphia area that developed from his business enterprises, which included social and philanthropic organizations that centered around supporting the lifestyle of Italian immigrant people to attain improved economic status and preserve traditional cultural heritage while living in the United States.

== Early life ==
Baldi was born 1862 in Castelnuovo Cilento, in the province of Salerno, Italy, the son of Vito Mario Baldi (1836–1888), and Rosa Galzerano (1840–1922). As a boy in Italy, he first distinguished himself by helping to write letters for the peasant women of his town to their relatives in the United States. Baldi would learn by reading about the USA in the letters coming back and attributed his fascination with life in the US to the letters. He emigrated from Italy to Philadelphia at age 14 with his father and 12-year old brother. Later he changed his name to "Charles Carmine Antonio Baldi" and adopted the "C.C.A. Baldi" naming convention.

== Career ==
His first start-up business in America was a push cart fruit stand that succeeded by skillfully cornering the local wholesaling and retailing market selling lemons. This successful enterprise provided revenue to invest in other ventures and he began to manage for profit job contracts with the railroads to employ Italian immigrants who needed to be employed in a job for them to come to the US and also facilitated their acquiring basic needs for housing and other services.

He organized a bank, the First Italian Exchange Bank, so immigrant workers could save their money and send money back to relatives in Italy. He owned and operated the largest daily Italian language newspaper L'Opinione from 1906–1930 that provided job openings, news of the day in both America and Italy. It later incorporated into the Italian language daily newspaper under Il Progresso Italo-Americano that began in 1906 as L'Opinione, and was published until 1989. Baldi founded an anthracite coal yard supply company, C.C.A. Baldi & Brothers Co Inc., based on experience the brothers had with mining operations and the need to supply an environmentally clean home heating fuel to replace wood.

Additionally, Baldi operated a real estate and insurance business catering to Italian immigrant workers and founded a charity organization, The Italian Federation of Charitable Societies, while providing a leadership role in the worker society Mutuo Soccorso di SanBiagio (St. Blase Mutual Relief Society). His early letter writing provided him language skills and he provided interpreter services for Italian-speaking people for the courts of Philadelphia. He established and operated a funeral home, Baldi Funeral Home, dedicated to servicing Italian Americans families that has carried his family name for over four generations in South Philadelphia. His interest in politics and education lead him to be appointed to the School District of Philadelphia Board of Education and served on that board until his death in 1930.

=== Awards and honors ===
On April 19, 1907, as a publisher he was awarded the decorations of Commander in the Order of the Crown of Italy and Knight in the Order of Saints Maurice and Lazarus (Italian: Ordine dei Santi Maurizio e Lazzaro) (abbreviated OSSML), a Roman Catholic dynastic order of knighthood, awarded him by King Victor Emmanuel III for his work on behalf of Italians living in the USA.

In 1974, the City of Philadelphia recognized C.C.A. Baldi as the first immigrant named to the School District of Philadelphia Board of Education, on which he served until his death in 1930, by naming Baldi Middle School after him to commemorate his service in education.

In 2017, the C.C.A. Baldi residence located at 319 Green Lane, Philadelphia was designated as a Historic Place in Pennsylvania by the Pennsylvania Historical and Museum Commission.

=== Baldi Brothers ===
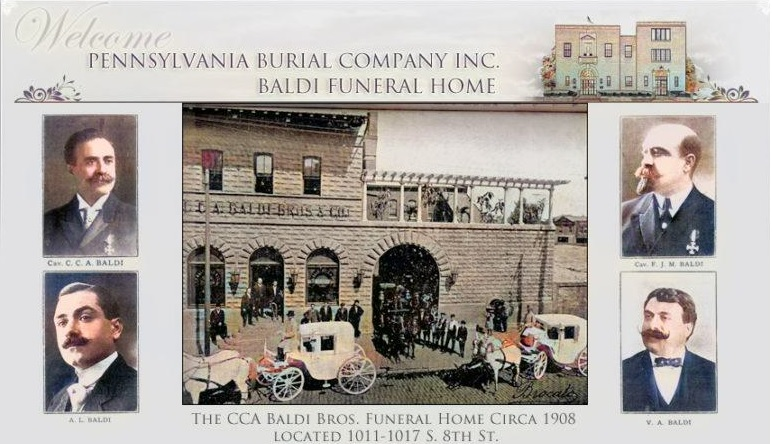
Baldi Funeral Home year 1908 located at 1011–1017 S. 8th St Philadelphia, PA – Photo of Baldi Brothers

The Baldi Brothers of Philadelphia embraced many enterprises in the early 1900’s, with C.C.A. BALDI Brothers diversified in lines of banking, real estate, insurance, transatlantic steamship agency, coal sales, livery stable, funeral undertaking and newspaper publication. Five of the brothers worked together: C.C.A. Baldi, Giuseppe (Joseph), Virgilio, Guerrino and Alfonso. The family heritage was well established in Italy for centuries, with the father, Vito Baldi being a contractor and a houseman in the Province of Salerno where the five boys were born.

== Family ==
Baldi was the father of five sons and two daughters:

- Dr. Frederick. S. Baldi, medical director of the Philadelphia County prisons and former president of the Philadelphia County Medical Society;
- Vito M. Baldi;
- Charles Carmine Antonio Baldi Jr., member of the Pennsylvania House of Representatives from the Second District;
- Joseph F.M. Baldi, member of the Pennsylvania House of Representatives from the Fourteenth District;
- Virgil Baldi;
- Rose Baldi; and
- Louise Baldi Douglas (1896–1976), married to Charles Gwynn Douglas (1891–1959), 3 children.
  - Charles Gwynn Douglas Jr., married Betsy Graham
    - Chuck Douglas, former United States Representative from New Hampshire and a former New Hampshire Supreme Court associate justice
  - Louise Douglas Turner
  - Rose Baldi Douglas Swift, married Archie Dean Swift Jr., 3 children
    - Archie Dean Swift III
    - Douglas Swift
    - Scott Kingsley Swift, married Andrea Gardner Finlay, 2 children
      - Taylor Swift, married Travis Kelce (2026)
      - Austin Swift

Baldi's great-grandson, Chuck Douglas, wrote a book about his life.
