= The Eras Tour Book =

2024 photobook by Taylor Swift

The Official Taylor Swift | The Eras Tour Book
- Front cover
- Author: Taylor Swift
- Language: English
- Subject: The Eras Tour
- Genre: Biography
- Publisher: Taylor Swift Publications
- Publication date: November 29, 2024
- Publication place: United States
- Media type: Hardcover
- Pages: 256

The Eras Tour Book (officially titled The Official Taylor Swift | The Eras Tour Book) is a limited-edition photo book, self-published by the American singer-songwriter Taylor Swift. The book narrates her sixth concert tour, the Eras Tour (2023–2024). Photos of the concerts and behind-the-scenes are included along with personal essays by Swift. The book has been criticized for containing many typos and errors. It sold a million copies in its first week of release.

== Background ==
The Eras Tour Book was created to commemorate The Eras Tour. The tour, which began in Glendale, Arizona, United States, on March 17, 2023, and concluded in Vancouver, Canada, on December 8, 2024, was conceived as a retrospective journey through all of Swift's studio albums, or "eras" up to that point. The tour achieved unprecedented financial success, becoming the highest-grossing concert tour in history, with its estimated gross revenue surpassing $2 billion, approximately double that of any previous tour by any artist.

== Content and design ==
The Eras Tour Book is a 256-page hardcover coffee-table photobook authored by Swift. The book contains performance photography, rehearsal images, and behind-the-scenes content, as well as handwritten notes, brief essays, and song lyrics written by Swift. Each chapter corresponds to a different studio album from Swift's discography, a structure that parallels the multi-era concept of the tour. It opens with a foreword written by Swift. In the introduction, she describes the conceptual origin of the tour and explains her decision to design a concert experience that would reflect multiple phases of her career, rather than focusing on an album tour.

== Release and distribution ==
The Eras Tour Book was released on November 29, 2024, aligned with the American Thanksgiving and Black Friday shopping period. It was an exclusive release at Target retail stores in the United States, with in-store availability beginning on Black Friday and online availability starting the next day, and was then made available internationally on December 7, 2024, through Swift's official online store, a release timed to coincide with the final performance of the Eras Tour in Vancouver.

== Reception and sales ==
The Eras Tour Book was commercially successful, selling an estimated 814,000 copies during its first three-day weekend on sale (November 30–December 1). This shattered records for books in 2024. Kirkus Reviews reported it as "the biggest book launch of the year". In its first week (November 29–December 5), sales approached one million copies. The Economic Times and other press noted it was one of the largest publishing launches ever for a celebrity book. Billboard and Kirkus Reviews emphasized it nearly broke the record for first-week sales of a non-fiction title; with only Barack Obama's memoir A Promised Land (2020), surpassing it.

The book was criticzed for containing typographical errors, blurry images, and inconsistent layouts, leading some press to dub the book The Errors Tour Book. The Cut described the book as "riddled with grammatical errors, blurry photos and graphic design flaws".
