= Austin Swift =

American music executive (born 1992)

- Born: Austin Kingsley Swift; March 11, 1992 (age 34); West Reading, Pennsylvania, U.S.
- Education: University of Notre Dame
- Occupations: Music executive; producer; actor
- Years active: 2016–present
- Relatives: Taylor Swift (sister); Marjorie Finlay (grandmother); Travis Kelce (brother-in-law)

Austin Kingsley Swift (born March 11, 1992) is an American music executive, producer, and actor who has appeared in films such as Live by Night and I.T. (both 2016). The younger brother of singer-songwriter Taylor Swift, he has appeared in and produced several of her music videos, and manages elements of her music licensing for multimedia uses.

Swift was born in West Reading, Pennsylvania. He graduated from the University of Notre Dame in 2015, studying film and acting in plays. Swift interned at Lionsgate and made his film debut in the 2016 thriller I.T. Swift has appeared in various films and TV shows, including Embeds, Still the King, Cover Versions, Braking for Whales, and We Summon the Darkness.

== Early life ==
Austin Kingsley Swift was born on March 11, 1992, at Reading Hospital in West Reading, Pennsylvania. His father, Scott Swift, is a financial advisor at Merrill Lynch, and his mother, Andrea Gardner Swift (née Finlay), is a former homemaker who had previously worked as a mutual fund marketing executive. His maternal grandmother, Marjorie Finlay, was an opera singer. Swift's mother is of Scottish and German descent; and his father is of Scottish and English descent with distant Italian ancestry. Swift's paternal great-great-grandfather, Charles Carmine Antonio Baldi, was an Italian immigrant entrepreneur and community leader who opened several businesses in Philadelphia in the 1800s. Swift moved from Wyomissing, Pennsylvania, to Hendersonville, Tennessee with his family at a young age.

Swift attended Pope Saint John Paul II Preparatory School in Hendersonville. He graduated from the University of Notre Dame in 2015, where he studied film and had roles in plays such as Dead Man's Cell Phone and Six Characters in Search of an Author. Swift transferred to Vanderbilt University but eventually transferred back to Notre Dame to complete his studies.

== Career ==
Swift interned at Lionsgate, where his responsibilities included making and sending out screeners. He made his film debut in the 2016 thriller I.T. starring Pierce Brosnan. Swift has also appeared in Live by Night, Megyn Kelly's political drama Embeds, sitcom Still the King, and Todd Berger's Cover Versions. In 2019, he starred in the indie movie Braking for Whales, originally titled Whaling, written by Tammin Sursok and her husband Sean McEwen, and in the horror thriller We Summon the Darkness, directed by Marc Meyers.

== Filmography ==
=== Film ===
Year	Title	Role	Notes
2016	I.T.	Lance	
2016	Live by Night	Mayweather	
2018	Cover Versions	Kirk	
2019	Braking for Whales	J.T.	
2019	We Summon the Darkness	Ivan	Co-producer
2020	Folklore: The Long Pond Studio Sessions	—N/a	Executive Producer

=== Television ===
Year	Title	Role	Notes
2017	Embeds	Colin	2 episodes
2017	Still the King	Tyler	Episode: "Showcase Showdown"
2025	Taylor Swift: The End of an Era	Himself	Episode: "Remember This Moment"

=== Music video ===
Year	Title	Artist(s)	Role	Note(s)	Ref.
2009	"The Best Day"	Taylor Swift	Himself	Archive footage	
2019	"Christmas Tree Farm"	Taylor Swift	Himself	Archive footage	
2021	"The Best Day (Taylor's Version)"	Taylor Swift	Himself	Archive footage	
2021	"I Bet You Think About Me"	Taylor Swift featuring Chris Stapleton	—N/a	As producer; directed by Blake Lively	
2022	"Anti-Hero"	Taylor Swift	Ghost	Cameo	
2026	"Opalite"	Taylor Swift	Christmas party guest	Cameo	
