= Taylor Swift =

American singer-songwriter (born 1989)

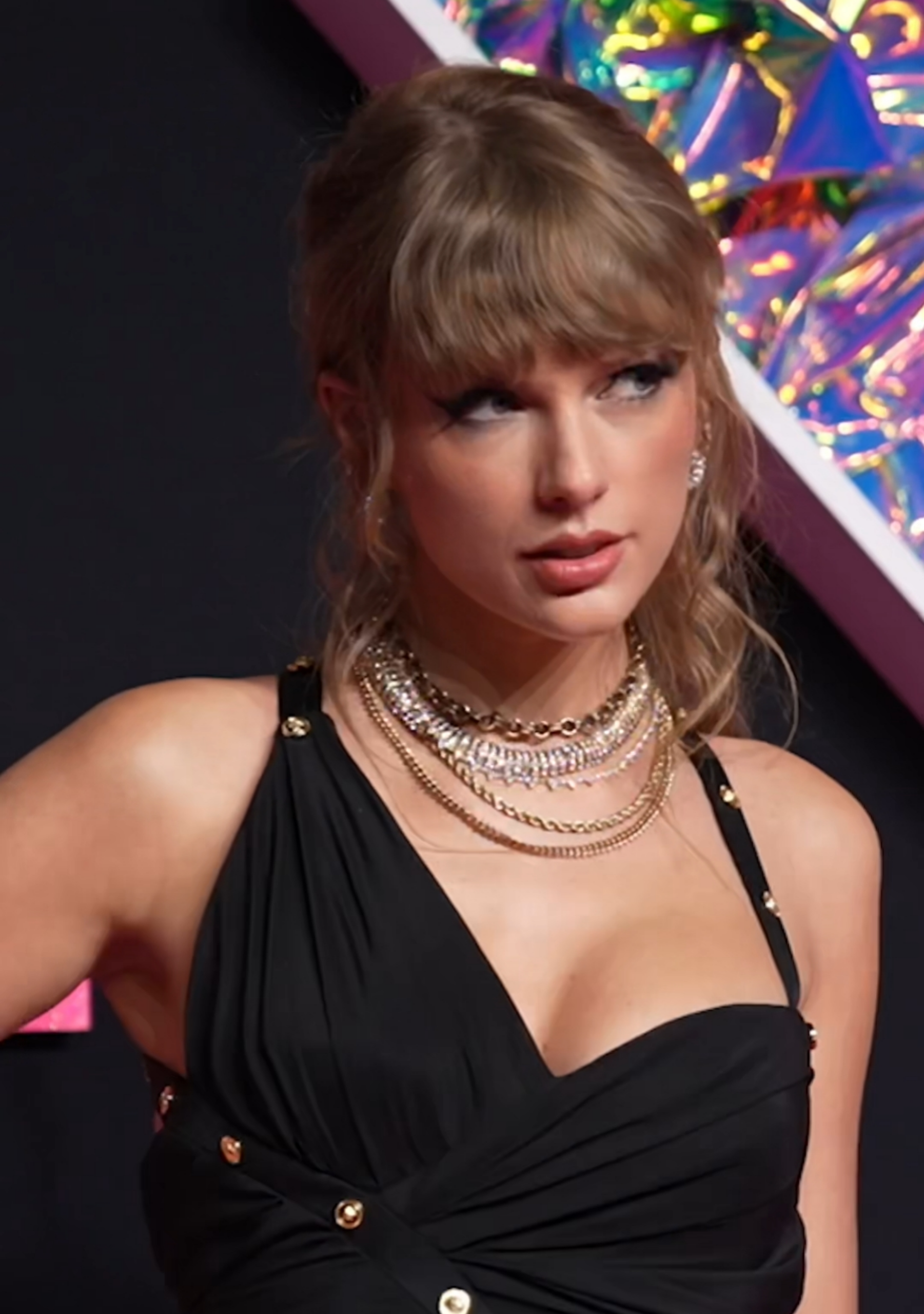
- Swift in 2023
- Born: Taylor Alison Swift; December 13, 1989 (age 36); West Reading, Pennsylvania, US
- Occupation: Singer-songwriter
- Years active: 2003–present
- Organization: Taylor Swift Productions
- Works: Albums; singles; songs; videos; performances
- Spouse: Travis Kelce (m. 2026)
- Relatives: Austin Swift (brother); Marjorie Finlay (grandmother)
- Awards: Full list
- Musical career
- Origin: Nashville, Tennessee
- Genres: Pop; country; folk
- Instruments: Vocals; guitar; piano; banjo; ukulele
- Labels: Big Machine; Republic
- Website: taylorswift.com

Taylor Alison Swift (born December 13, 1989) is an American singer-songwriter. An influential figure in popular culture, Swift is known for her autobiographical songwriting and artistic reinventions. She is the highest-grossing live music artist, the wealthiest female musician, and one of the best-selling music artists of all time.

Swift signed with Big Machine Records in 2005 and debuted as a country singer with the albums Taylor Swift (2006) and Fearless (2008). The singles "Teardrops on My Guitar", "Love Story", and "You Belong with Me" found crossover success on country and pop radio formats. Her songs began incorporating stronger rock elements with Speak Now (2010) and electronic styles with Red (2012). She subsequently recalibrated her artistic identity from country to pop with the synth-pop album 1989 (2014), while ensuing media scrutiny inspired the trap-imbued Reputation (2017). Through the 2010s, Swift accumulated the US Billboard Hot 100 number-one singles "We Are Never Ever Getting Back Together", "Shake It Off", "Blank Space", "Bad Blood", and "Look What You Made Me Do".

Shifting to Republic Records in 2018, Swift released the eclectic pop album Lover (2019) and re-recorded four of her first six albums due to a dispute with Big Machine. She explored indie folk on the 2020 albums Folklore and Evermore, followed by mellower pop subgenres on Midnights (2022) and The Tortured Poets Department (2024), as well as soft rock on The Life of a Showgirl (2025). The singles "Cardigan", "Willow", "All Too Well (Taylor's Version)", "Anti-Hero", "Cruel Summer", "Is It Over Now?", "Fortnight", "The Fate of Ophelia", "Opalite", "I Knew It, I Knew You", and "Patient Zero" topped the Hot 100. Her Eras Tour (2023–2024) and its associated film, Taylor Swift: The Eras Tour (2023), are the highest-grossing concert tour and concert film of all time.

Swift is the only artist to have been named the IFPI Global Recording Artist of the Year six times. A record eight of her albums have each sold over a million copies first-week in the US. Publications such as Rolling Stone and Billboard have ranked Swift among the greatest artists of all time. She is the first individual from the arts to be named Time Person of the Year (2023) and the youngest female inductee into the Songwriters Hall of Fame (2026). Her accolades include 14 Grammy Awards—including a record four Album of the Year wins—and a Primetime Emmy Award. Swift is the most-awarded artist of the American Music Awards, the Billboard Music Awards, and the MTV Video Music Awards. A subject of extensive media coverage, she has a global fanbase known as Swifties.

== Life and career ==
=== Early life ===
Taylor Alison Swift was born on December 13, 1989, in West Reading, Pennsylvania. She is named after the singer-songwriter James Taylor; her parents chose a unisex name, hoping it would help her succeed in business. Her father, Scott Kingsley Swift, was a stockbroker for Merrill Lynch, and her mother, Andrea Gardner Swift (née Finlay), worked as a mutual fund marketing executive. Swift's younger brother, Austin, is an actor who manages her film projects. Taylor and Austin are of Scottish, English, and German descent, with distant Irish and Italian ancestry; they are paternal great-great-grandchildren of Charles Carmine Antonio Baldi, a prominent Philadelphia businessman. (Note: Attributed to multiple references:) Their maternal grandmother, Marjorie Finlay (née Moehlenkamp), was an opera singer whose singing in church became one of Swift's earliest memories of music.

During childhood, Swift spent her holiday seasons on a Christmas tree farm in Pennsylvania, and summers at her family's vacation home in Stone Harbor, New Jersey, where she occasionally performed acoustic songs at a local coffee shop. Raised Christian, she attended preschool and kindergarten at a Montessori school run by the Bernardine Sisters of St. Francis before transferring to the Wyndcroft School in Pottstown. When her family moved to Wyomissing, she attended Wyomissing Area Junior/Senior High School. At age nine, she aspired to a career in musical theater, performing at local festivals and in Berks Youth Theatre Academy productions, and traveling regularly to New York City for vocal and acting lessons. After watching a documentary about Faith Hill, she changed her goal and became determined to pursue a country music career in Nashville, Tennessee.

At the age of 11, Swift traveled to Nashville with her mother to visit record labels and submit demo tapes of Dolly Parton and Dixie Chicks karaoke covers. She was rejected by all the labels, which led her to focus on songwriting. She started learning the guitar at the age of 12 with the help of a computer repairman and local musician who assisted Swift in writing an original song. In 2003, she and her parents started working with the talent manager Dan Dymtrow. With his help, Swift modeled for Abercrombie & Fitch, had an original song included on a Maybelline compilation CD, and was given an artist development deal from RCA Records at 13. To help Swift break into the country music scene, her father transferred to Merrill Lynch's Nashville office when she was 14 years old, and the family relocated to Hendersonville, Tennessee. Swift attended Hendersonville High School for two years before transferring to Aaron Academy, which offered homeschooling.

=== 2004–2008: Career beginnings and Taylor Swift ===
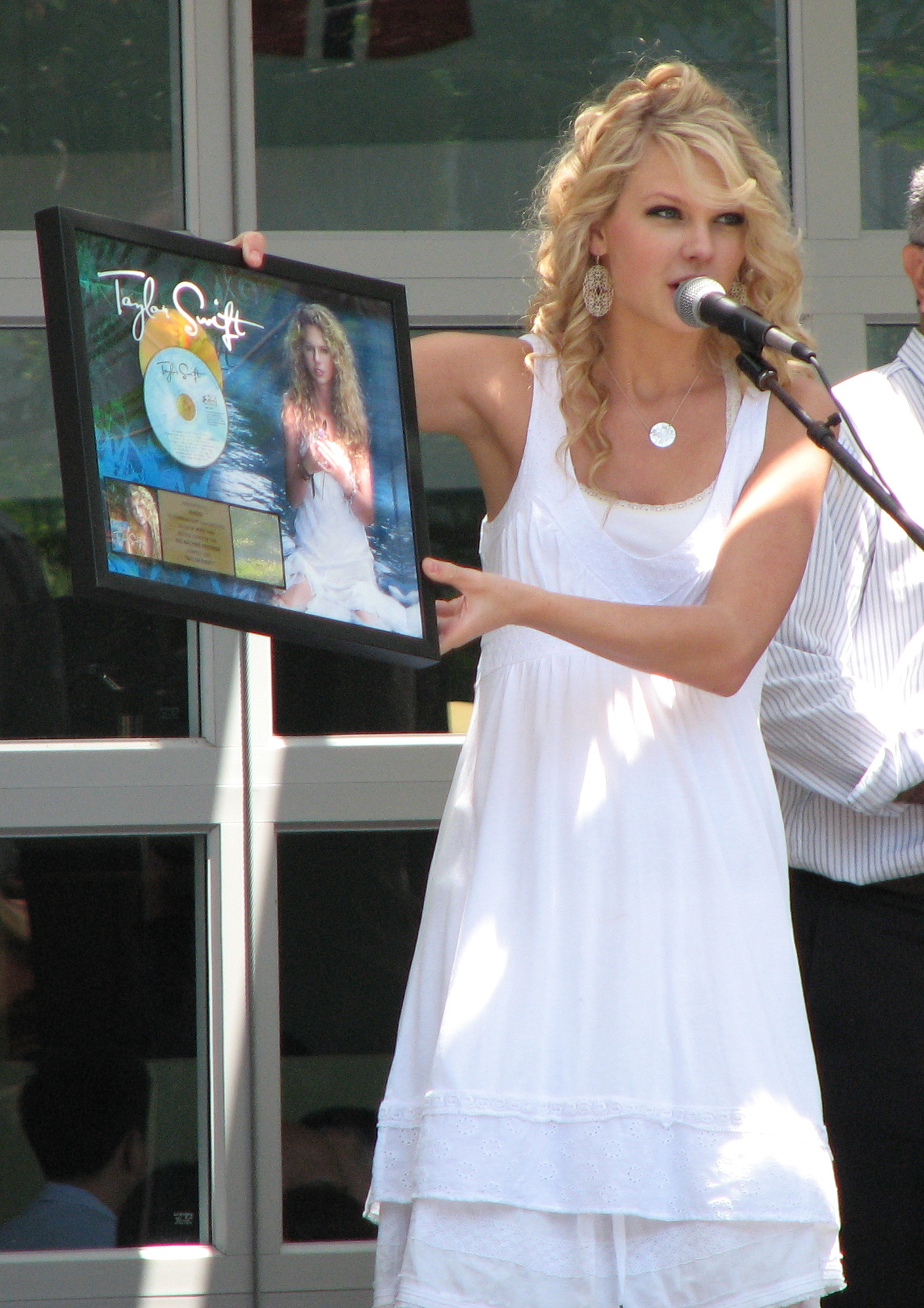
Swift promoting her debut album in 2007

Swift signed with Sony/ATV Tree Music Publishing in 2004; at 14, she became the youngest person in that publishing company's history. In Nashville, she worked with experienced Music Row songwriters, including Liz Rose. Rose and Swift would write songs every Tuesday afternoon after school. After one year on the development deal, she left RCA Records, which was planning to keep her in development until she turned 18. Swift made this decision because she wanted to release the songs immediately to ensure that they still resonated with her teenage experiences.

Swift organized a showcase concert at the Bluebird Cafe on November 3, 2004; among the attendees was Scott Borchetta, a music executive who was planning to establish an independent record label called Big Machine Records. She signed a recording contract with Big Machine two weeks after the concert, on the condition that her albums would be self-written; her father purchased a three-percent stake in the company. The contract was finalized by July 2005, when Swift ended her working relationship with Dymtrow. She spent four months near the end of 2005 recording her debut album, Taylor Swift, with the producer Nathan Chapman.

Swift's debut single, "Tim McGraw", was released in June 2006. She and her mother spent mid-2006 sending promotional copies of the song to country radio stations across the US. Taylor Swift was released on October 24, 2006. On the US Billboard 200 chart, the album peaked at number five and spent 157 weeks on the chart—the longest chart run by an album in the 2000s. With Taylor Swift, she became the first female country music artist to write or co-write every track on a platinum-certified debut album. Swift promoted the album with a six-month radio tour and by opening for other country artists, including Rascal Flatts in 2006, and George Strait, Brad Paisley, and Tim McGraw and Faith Hill in 2007. She opened for Rascal Flatts again in 2008, when she dated the singer Joe Jonas.

Taylor Swift was supported by four more singles in 2007 and 2008: "Teardrops on My Guitar", "Our Song", "Picture to Burn", and "Should've Said No". "Our Song" and "Should've Said No" reached number one on the Hot Country Songs chart; with the former single, Swift became the youngest person to single-handedly write and sing a number-one country single. "Teardrops on My Guitar" was Swift's breakthrough single on mainstream radio and charts, reaching the top 10 of the Pop Songs, Adult Pop Songs, and Adult Contemporary charts. Her next releases were the Christmas extended play (EP) The Taylor Swift Holiday Collection in October 2007, and the Walmart-exclusive EP Beautiful Eyes in July 2008. Swift became the youngest person to be awarded with the Nashville Songwriters Association's Songwriter/Artist of the Year in 2007.

=== 2008–2010: Fearless ===
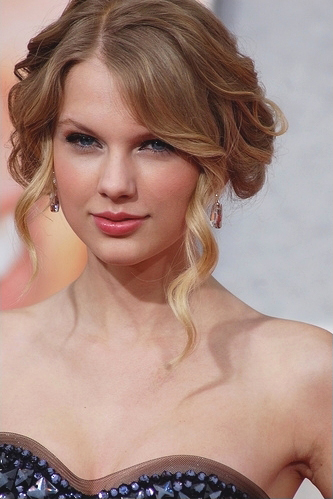
Swift at the 2009 premiere of Hannah Montana: The Movie. She had a cameo appearance in the film and wrote two songs for its soundtrack.

Swift's second album, Fearless, was released on November 11, 2008, in North America, and in March 2009 in other markets. Fearless spent eleven weeks at number one on the Billboard 200, becoming her first chart topping album and the longest-running number-one female country album; it was the best-selling album of 2009 in the US. The album's lead single, "Love Story", became the first country song to top the Pop Songs chart, and its third single, "You Belong with Me", was the first country song to top Billboard's all-genre Radio Songs chart; both reached the top five of the Billboard Hot 100 chart and peaked atop the Hot Country Songs chart. Three other singles—"White Horse", "Fifteen", "Fearless"—all reached the top 10 of Hot Country Songs. In 2009, Swift opened for Keith Urban's tour and embarked on her first headlining concert tour, the Fearless Tour (2009–2010).

Fearless became the most-awarded country album of all time. It won the three highest awards for a country album: Album of the Year by both the Country Music Association Awards and Academy of Country Music Awards in 2009, and Best Country Album by the Grammy Awards in 2010. At the Grammy Awards, Fearless also won Album of the Year, and "White Horse" won Best Country Song and Best Female Country Vocal Performance. Also in 2009, Swift was named Artist of the Year by both the American Music Awards and Billboard, and Entertainer of the Year by the Country Music Association Awards, becoming the youngest person to receive the honor. "You Belong with Me" won Best Female Video at the MTV Video Music Awards. Her acceptance speech was interrupted by the rapper Kanye West, an incident that became the subject of controversy and widespread media coverage.

Swift featured in 2009 on "Half of My Heart" by John Mayer, with whom she was romantically linked later that year. She wrote "Best Days of Your Life" for Kellie Pickler, co-wrote and featured on Boys Like Girls' "Two Is Better Than One, and wrote "You'll Always Find Your Way Back Home" and wrote and recorded "Crazier" for the soundtrack of Hannah Montana: The Movie, in which she also had a cameo appearance. She made her acting debut in the 2010 rom-com Valentine's Day and wrote "Today Was a Fairytale" for its soundtrack. "Today Was a Fairytale" reached number one on the Canadian Hot 100. While shooting Valentine's Day in October 2009, Swift dated co-star Taylor Lautner. She made her television debut as a rebellious teenager in a CSI: Crime Scene Investigation episode and hosted and performed as the musical guest on Saturday Night Live; she was the first host to write their own opening monologue.

=== 2010–2014: Speak Now and Red ===
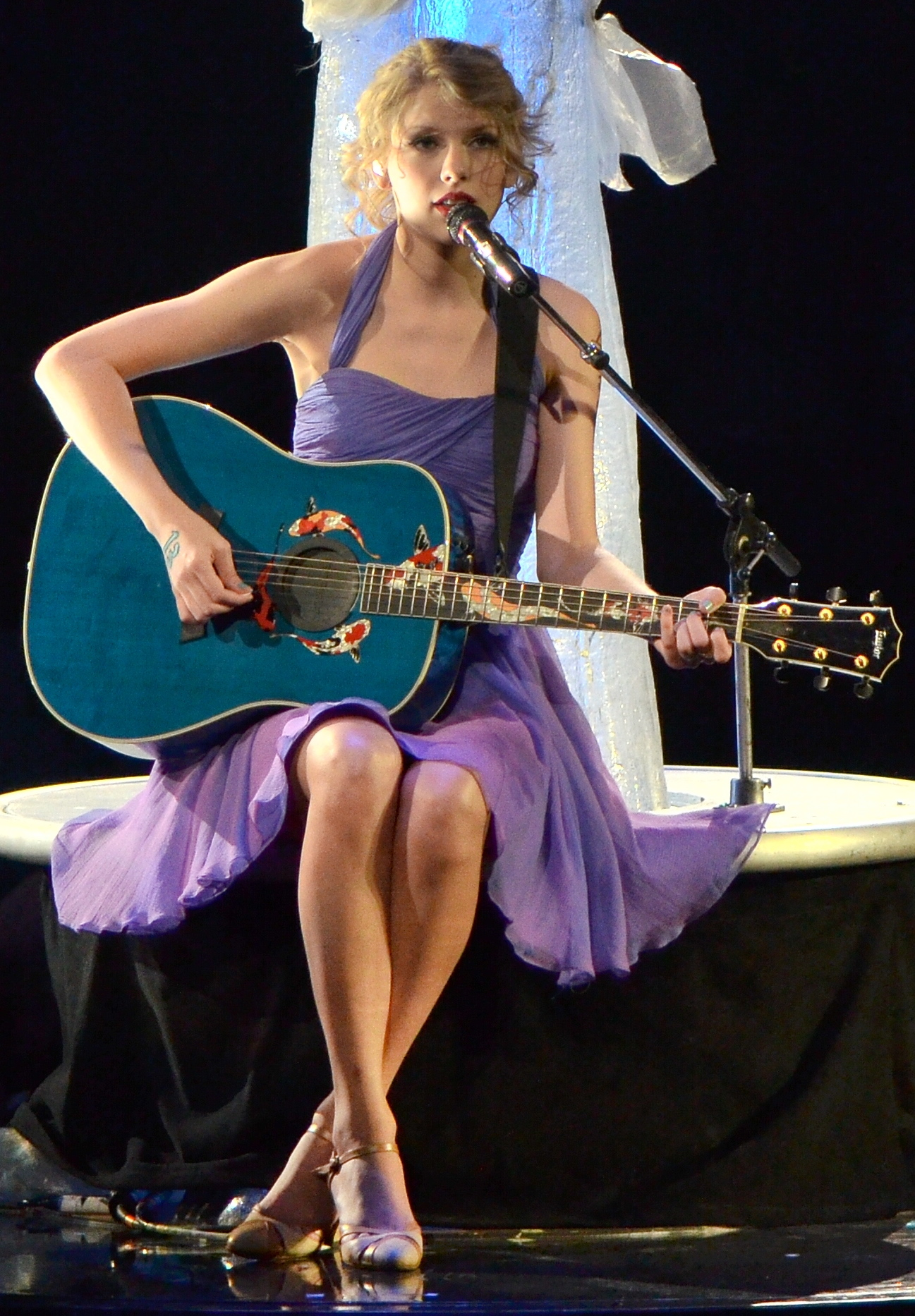
Swift on the Speak Now World Tour in 2011

Swift wrote her third album, Speak Now, entirely by herself. Released on October 25, 2010, it debuted atop the US Billboard 200 with over one million first-week copies sold—the highest single-week tally for a female country artist. Five of its singles—"Mine", "Back to December", "Mean", "Sparks Fly", and "Ours"—charted in the top three of Hot Country Songs; "Sparks Fly" and "Ours" reached number one. "Mine" peaked at number three and was the album's highest-charting single on the Billboard Hot 100, and "Mean" became its best-selling track. Swift supported the album with the Speak Now World Tour (2011–2012) and its accompanying live album, Speak Now World Tour – Live (2011).

In 2011, Swift was honored as Woman of the Year by Billboard, Entertainer of the Year by both the Academy of Country Music Awards and the Country Music Association Awards, and Artist of the Year at the American Music Awards. She again won Entertainer of the Year at the Academy of Country Music Awards in 2012. At the 54th Annual Grammy Awards in 2012, "Mean" won Best Country Song and Best Country Solo Performance. After the release of Speak Now, Swift briefly dated the actor Jake Gyllenhaal.

On October 22, 2012, Swift released her fourth album, Red, which she produced with Chapman and several new collaborators, including Max Martin, Shellback, Dan Wilson, Jeff Bhasker, Dann Huff, and Butch Walker. It debuted at number one on the Billboard 200 with 1.21 million sales, becoming the fastest-selling country album in US history. Red was Swift's first number-one album in the UK. During the promotion of Red, Swift was romantically involved with the political heir Conor Kennedy, and subsequently the singer Harry Styles.

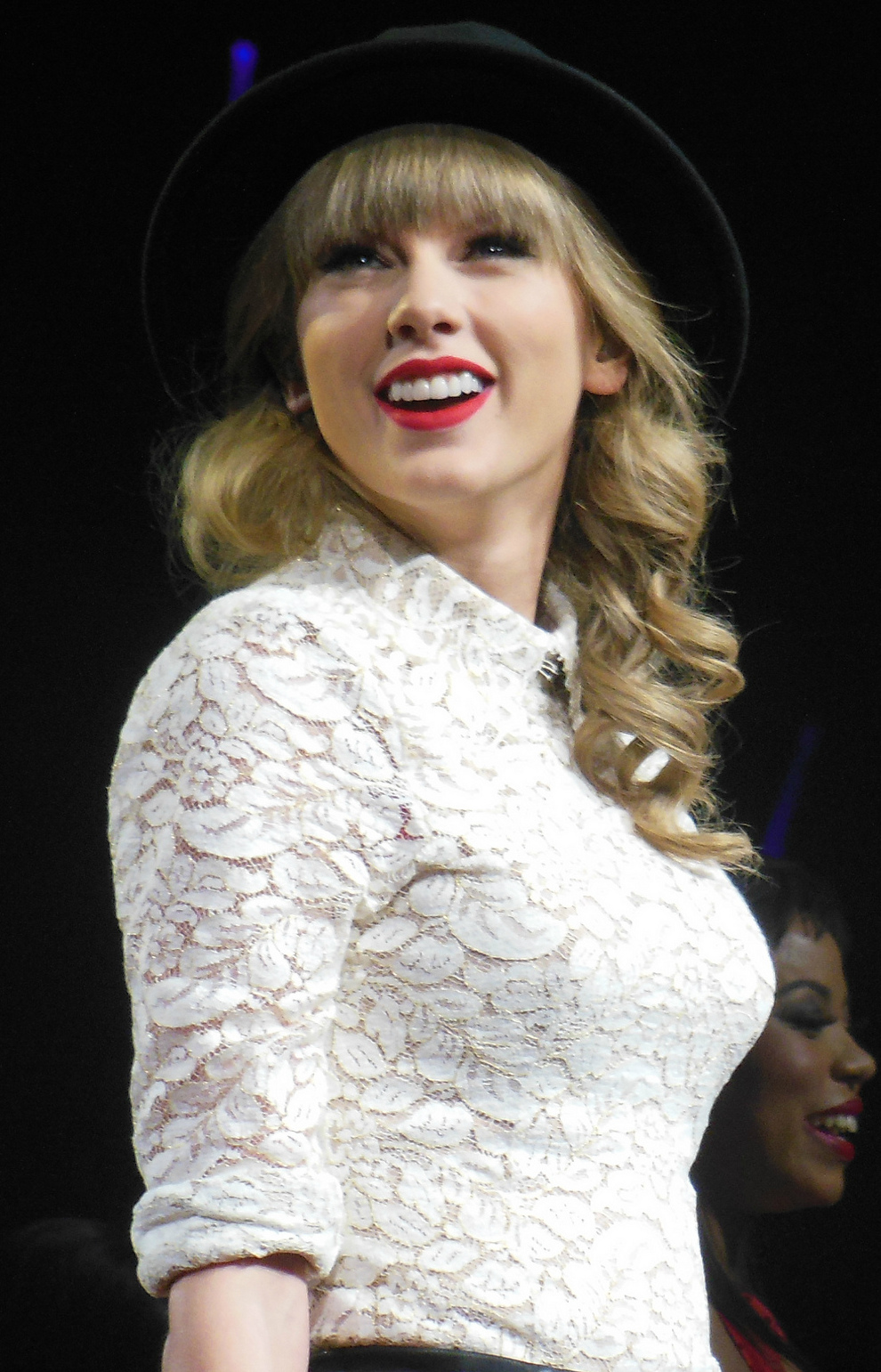
Swift on the Red Tour in 2013

The two most successful singles from Red, "We Are Never Ever Getting Back Together" and "I Knew You Were Trouble", peaked at numbers one and two on the Billboard Hot 100. Both songs also reached the top five on the UK singles chart, and the former was Swift's first chart topper in the US. The singles "Begin Again" and "Red" peaked in the top 10 of the Billboard Hot 100, while "Everything Has Changed" and "22" reached the top 10 on the UK singles chart. The Red Tour ran from March 2013 to June 2014 and became the highest-grossing country tour with revenue of $150.2 million upon completion. Swift was named Artist of the Year at the American Music Awards in 2013.

Swift wrote and recorded two songs for the soundtrack album to the 2012 dystopian film The Hunger Games: "Eyes Open" and "Safe & Sound". The latter, co-written with the Civil Wars and T-Bone Burnett, won the Grammy Award for Best Song Written for Visual Media in 2013. She wrote and recorded "Sweeter than Fiction" for the soundtrack to the 2013 biographical film One Chance, and featured as a guest vocalist on B.o.B's 2012 single "Both of Us" and Tim McGraw's 2013 single "Highway Don't Care". Her acting roles included a voice acting role in the 2012 animated film The Lorax and a supporting role in the 2014 dystopian film The Giver.

=== 2014–2018: 1989 and Reputation ===
Swift relocated from Nashville to New York City in March 2014 and transformed her image from country to pop with her fifth album, 1989. She produced 1989 with Martin, Shellback, Chapman, and new collaborators Jack Antonoff, Imogen Heap, Ryan Tedder, and Ali Payami. Released on October 27, 2014, the album spent eleven weeks at number one and one year in the top 10 of the Billboard 200. It has sold 14 million copies worldwide, becoming Swift's best-selling album. Three of 1989's singles—"Shake It Off", "Blank Space", and "Bad Blood"—reached number one on the Billboard Hot 100; the first two made Swift the first woman to replace herself at the top spot. Two other singles—"Style" and "Wildest Dreams"—peaked at numbers six and five, making 1989 the first album by Swift to have five consecutive top 10 singles on the Hot 100.

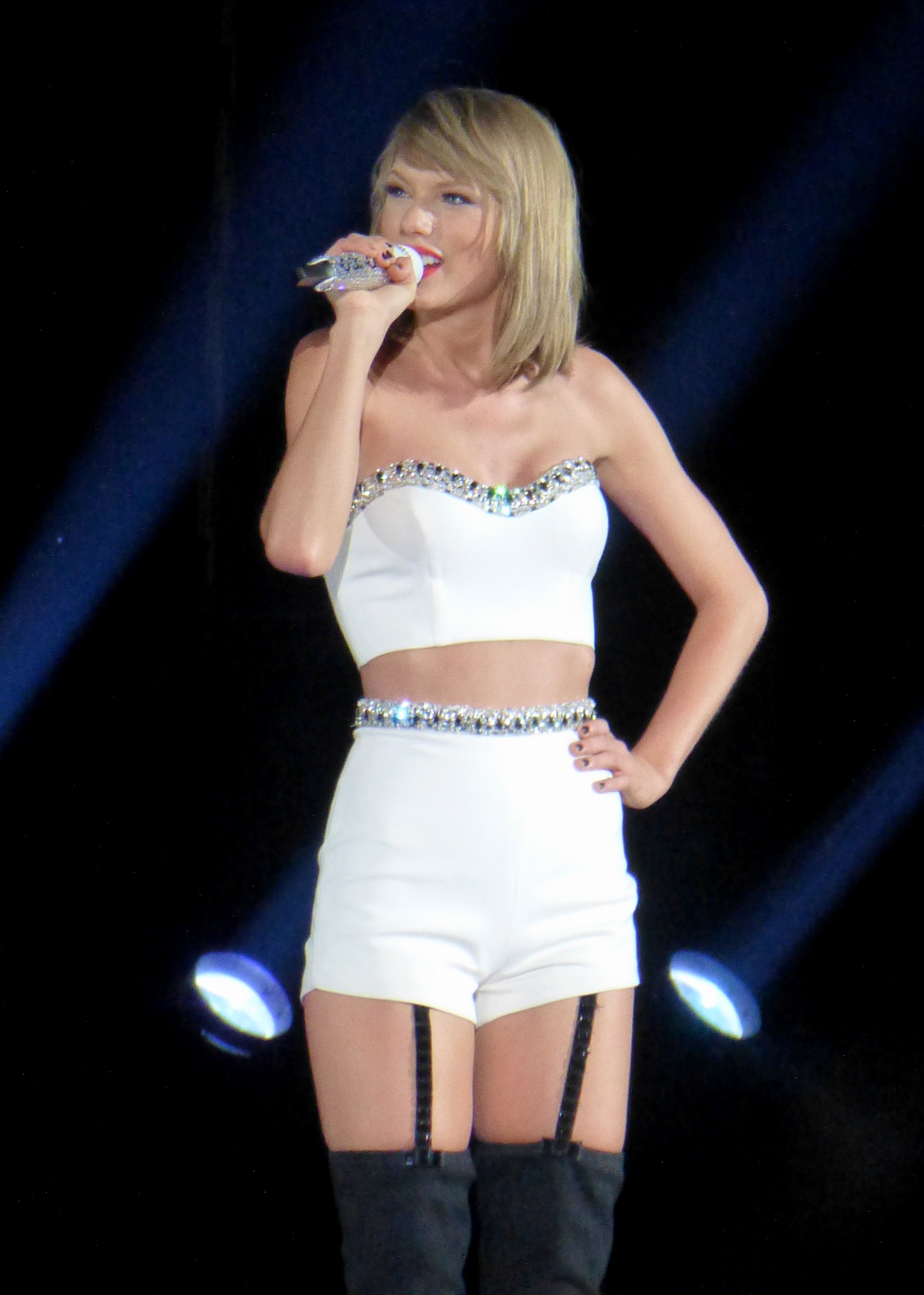
Swift on the 1989 World Tour, the highest-grossing tour of 2015

Swift supported 1989 with the 1989 World Tour, the highest-grossing tour of 2015 with $250 million in revenue. She was named Billboard's Woman of the Year and received the inaugural Dick Clark Award for Excellence at the American Music Awards in 2014, and "Bad Blood" won Video of the Year and Best Collaboration at the MTV Video Music Awards in 2015. At the 58th Annual Grammy Awards in 2016, 1989 made Swift the first woman to win Album of the Year twice and also won Best Pop Vocal Album, while "Bad Blood" won Best Music Video. The most-awarded pop album of all time, 1989 was selected for preservation in the National Recording Registry in 2026.

During the promotion of 1989, Swift publicly opposed free music streaming services and their compensation of artists. She published an op-ed in The Wall Street Journal in July 2014 to stress the importance of albums as a creative medium for artists, and, in November, removed her discography from ad-supported, free streaming platforms such as Spotify. Big Machine kept her music only on paid, subscription-required platforms. In a June 2015 open letter, Swift criticized Apple Music for not offering royalties to artists during its free three-month trial period and threatened to withdraw her music from the platform, prompting Apple Inc. to announce that it would pay artists during the free trial period. Big Machine returned Swift's catalog to Spotify and other free streaming platforms in June 2017.

Swift dated the DJ Calvin Harris from March 2015 to June 2016. They co-wrote "This Is What You Came For", an EDM single by Harris featuring Rihanna; Swift was initially credited under the pseudonym Nils Sjöberg. Swift also wrote "Better Man", recorded by Little Big Town in 2016, which won the Country Music Association Award for Song of the Year. She wrote and recorded "I Don't Wanna Live Forever" with Zayn Malik for the soundtrack to the 2017 film Fifty Shades Darker; it peaked at number two on the Billboard Hot 100, the highest for a Fifty Shades single.

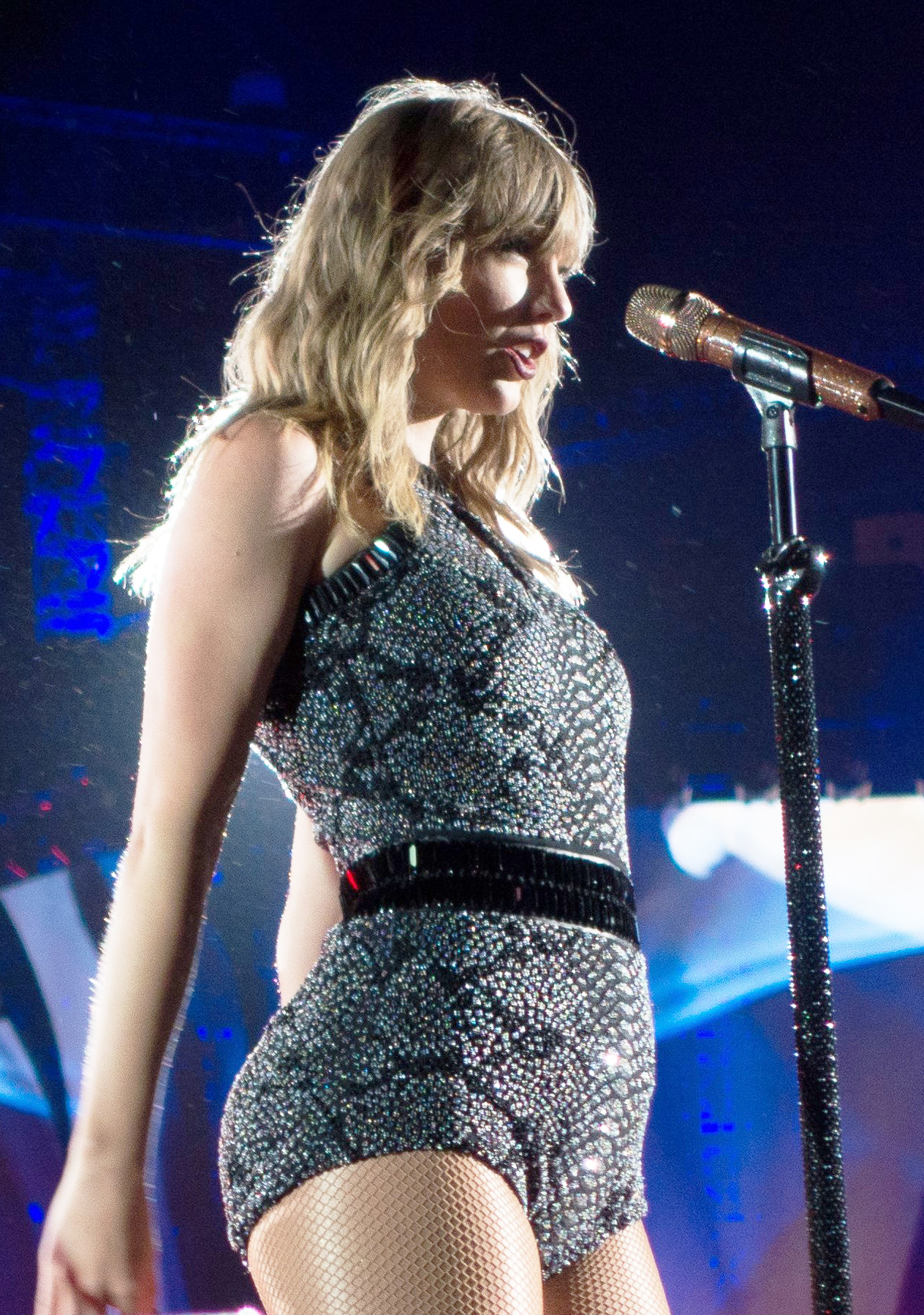
Swift on her Reputation Stadium Tour in 2018

In April 2016, Kanye West released the single "Famous", in which he references Swift in the line, "I made that bitch famous." Swift criticized West and said she never consented to the lyric, but West claimed that he had received her approval, and his then-wife, Kim Kardashian, released video clips of Swift and West discussing the song amicably over the phone. Although the clips were proven to be purposefully edited, the controversy made Swift a subject of an online "cancel" movement, in which her critics denounced her as a fake and calculating "snake". In late 2016, after briefly dating the actor Tom Hiddleston, Swift began a six-year relationship with the actor Joe Alwyn and went on hiatus.

In August 2017, Swift countersued and won a case against David Mueller, a former radio jockey, who sued her for damages from loss of employment. Four years earlier, she informed Mueller's employer that he had sexually assaulted her by groping her at an event. Public controversies influenced Swift's sixth album, Reputation, which explores themes of fame and finding love amidst the tumultuous affairs. Released on November 10, 2017, Reputation debuted atop the Billboard 200 with 1.21 million US sales and recorded first-week worldwide sales of two million copies.

Reputation's lead single, "Look What You Made Me Do", topped the Billboard Hot 100 with the highest sales and streaming week of 2017, and was Swift's first UK number-one single. The singles "...Ready for It?", "End Game", and "Delicate" were released to pop radio and all peaked in the top 20 of the Billboard Hot 100. In 2018, Swift featured on Sugarland's "Babe" and embarked on the Reputation Stadium Tour, which grossed $345.7 million worldwide.

=== 2018–2021: Lover, Folklore, and Evermore ===
In November 2018, Swift signed a record deal with Universal Music Group, which promoted her albums under Republic Records' imprint. The contract included a provision allowing Swift to maintain ownership of her master recordings. In addition, if Universal sold any part of its stake in Spotify, it agreed to distribute a non-recoupable portion of the proceeds to its artists.

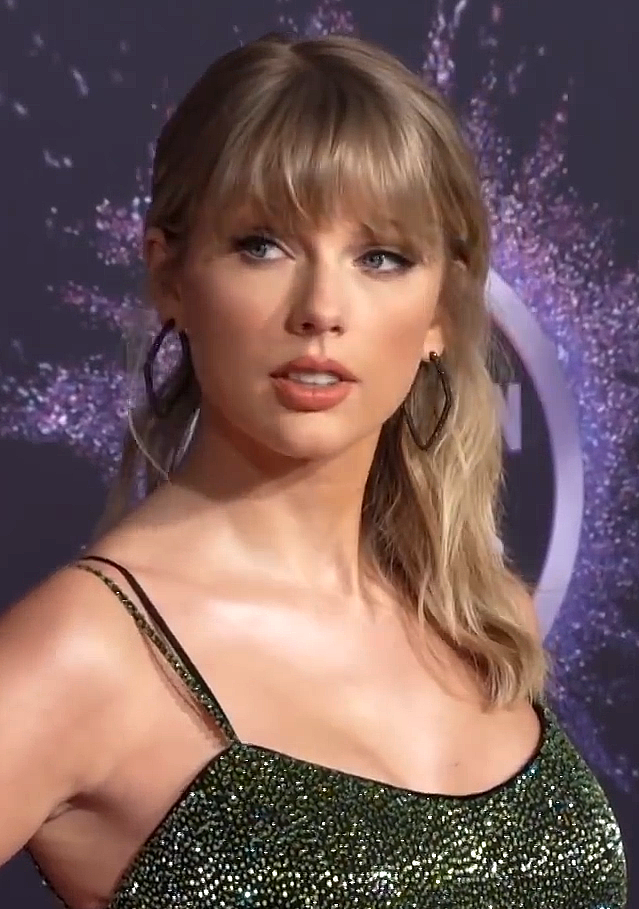
Swift at the American Music Awards of 2019, where she was named Artist of the Decade

Swift's first album with Republic Records and seventh overall, Lover, was released on August 23, 2019. She produced the album with Antonoff, Louis Bell, Frank Dukes, and Joel Little. Lover peaked atop the charts of such countries as Australia, Canada, Ireland, Mexico, Norway, Sweden, the UK, and the US, and was the global best-selling album by a solo artist of 2019. Three of its singles—"Me!", "You Need to Calm Down", and "Lover"—were released in 2019 and peaked in the top 10 of the Billboard Hot 100. "The Man" was released in 2020 and charted highly, and "Cruel Summer" became a resurgent success in 2023, reaching number one. Swift promoted Lover with the one-off City of Lover concert, its accompanying television special, and the live album Lover (Live from Paris), which set the record for the largest vinyl sales week by a live album in the US.

In 2019, Swift was named Artist of the Decade by the American Music Awards and Woman of the Decade by Billboard, and became the first female artist to win the MTV Video Music Award for Video of the Year for a self-directed video, with "You Need to Calm Down". During the promotion of Lover, Swift became embroiled in a public dispute with the talent manager Scooter Braun after he purchased Big Machine Records, including the masters of her albums under the label. Swift said that Big Machine would allow her to acquire the masters only if she exchanged one new album for each older one under a new contract, which she declined. In November 2020, Swift began re-recording her back catalog to control the licensing of her songs for commercial use.

In February 2020, Swift signed a global publishing deal with Universal Music Publishing Group after her 16-year contract with Sony/ATV expired. During the COVID-19 pandemic, Swift collaborated with Antonoff and Aaron Dessner on two "sister albums" surprise-released in 2020: Folklore on July 24, and Evermore on December 11. Joe Alwyn co-wrote and co-produced several songs under the pseudonym William Bowery. Both albums incorporate atmospheric indie folk and indie rock sounds with orchestrations; each had three singles sent to US pop, country, and adult alternative radio—"Cardigan", "Betty", and "Exile" from Folklore, and "Willow", "No Body, No Crime", and "Coney Island" from Evermore. Folklore and "Cardigan" made Swift the first artist to debut a number-one album and a number-one song in the same week in the US; she achieved the feat again with Evermore and "Willow". Swift promoted Folklore with the documentary concert film Folklore: The Long Pond Studio Sessions (2020); its accompanying live album became the first Record Store Day-exclusive album to reach the top 10 of the Billboard 200.

Swift won Artist of the Year at the American Music Awards in 2020 and Album of the Year for Folklore at the 63rd Annual Grammy Awards in 2021, becoming the first woman to win the Grammy Award for Album of the Year three times. She played Bombalurina in the musical fantasy film Cats (2019), for which she co-wrote and recorded the original song "Beautiful Ghosts". The documentary Miss Americana, which chronicled parts of Swift's life and career, premiered at the 2020 Sundance Film Festival and received positive reviews.

=== 2021–2023: Re-recordings and Midnights ===
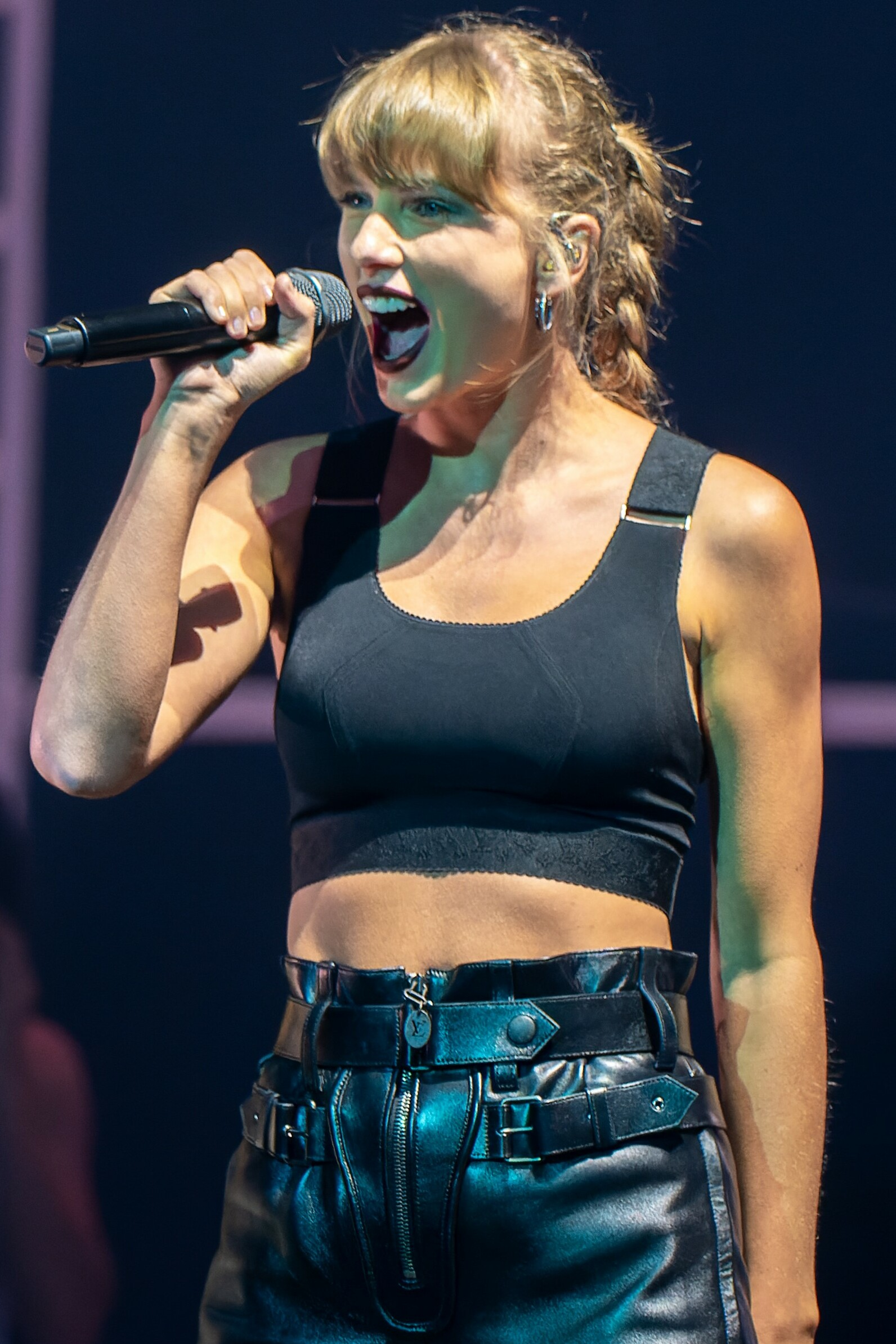
Swift performing in 2022

Swift released two re-recorded albums in 2021: Fearless (Taylor's Version) on April 9, and Red (Taylor's Version) on November 12. Both peaked atop the Billboard 200; the former was the first re-recorded album to do so. The latter helped Swift become the female musician with the most weeks at number one on the Top Country Albums chart, and its song "All Too Well (Taylor's Version)" became the longest song to top the Billboard Hot 100.

Swift's tenth album, Midnights, was released on October 21, 2022. Midnights was Swift's fifth album to open atop the Billboard 200 chart with US first-week sales of one million. Its tracks, led by the single "Anti-Hero", made her the first artist to occupy the entire top 10 of the Billboard Hot 100 the same week. The album peaked atop the charts of at least 14 other countries, including Australia, Canada, France, Germany, Italy, Norway, and Sweden. Two other singles, "Lavender Haze" and "Karma", both peaked at number two on the Billboard Hot 100.

In 2023, Swift released two re-recorded albums: Speak Now (Taylor's Version) on July 7, and 1989 (Taylor's Version) on October 27. Both debuted atop the Billboard 200, and the former made Swift the female artist with the most number-one albums on the chart. The single "Is It Over Now?" from 1989 (Taylor's Version) reached number one on the Billboard Hot 100, making Swift the first woman to have three number-one songs from three different albums in a calendar year. Swift featured on Big Red Machine's "Renegade" and "Birch" (2021), Haim's "Gasoline" (2021), Ed Sheeran's "The Joker and the Queen" (2022), and the National's "The Alcott" (2023). She wrote and recorded "Carolina" for the soundtrack to the 2022 mystery film Where the Crawdads Sing, and had a supporting role in the 2022 period comedy film Amsterdam. After splitting from Alwyn in April 2023, Swift dated the musician Matty Healy in May–June.

In 2022, Swift won Artist of the Year at the American Music Awards and Video of the Year for All Too Well: The Short Film, her self-directed short film that accompanies "All Too Well (10 Minute Version)", at the MTV Video Music Awards; All Too Well also won the Grammy Award for Best Music Video. The following year, she again won the MTV Video Music Award for Video of the Year with "Anti-Hero", became the first musician to rank at number one on Billboard's year-end top artists list in three different decades (2009, 2015 and 2023), and had five out of the 10 best-selling albums of the year in the US, a record since Luminate began tracking US music sales in 1991. At the 66th Annual Grammy Awards in 2024, Midnights made Swift the first artist to win Album of the Year four times; it also won Best Pop Vocal Album.

=== 2023–present: The Eras Tour, The Tortured Poets Department, and The Life of a Showgirl ===
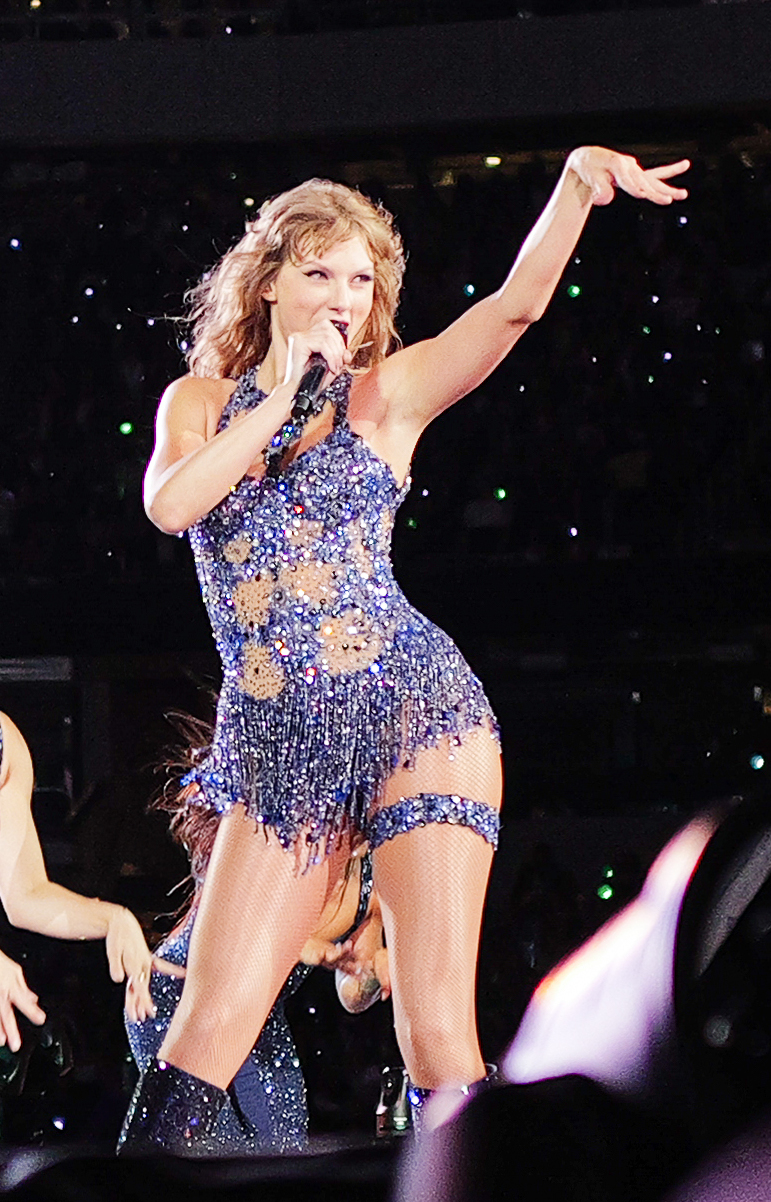
Swift on the Eras Tour in 2023

In March 2023, Swift embarked on the Eras Tour, which she conceived as a tribute to her entire discography. The tour spanned five continents through December 2024. It exerted a global cultural, economic, and political impact and culminated in an unprecedented height of popularity for Swift, resulting in a phenomenon that the media dubbed "Swiftmania". The Eras Tour became the first tour to gross $1 billion and the highest-grossing tour in history, with $2 billion in revenue. Its 2023 concert film became the highest-grossing of its kind with $250 million, and its 2024 photobook sold nearly one million copies in its first week in the US, followed by a 2025 documentary miniseries on Disney+. The events that happened during the tour inspired Swift's eleventh and twelfth albums, The Tortured Poets Department (2024) and The Life of a Showgirl (2025).

During the run of the Eras Tour, there were controversies surrounding Ticketmaster's monopoly that led to political scrutiny in the US, venue mismanagement that led to a concertgoer's death in Brazil, and Singapore's exclusivity deal that led to political tension in Southeast Asia. In January 2024, AI-generated pornographic images portraying Swift were posted to Twitter and spread to other social media platforms, spurring criticism and demands for legal reform. In July 2024, three children were killed in a stabbing attack at a Swift-themed workshop in Southport, England, leading to civil unrest in the UK. The following month, the Vienna concerts were canceled following the arrest of suspects who planned a terrorist attack. Swift began dating the football player Travis Kelce in August 2023, with the media dubbing them a "supercouple". They became engaged in August 2025 and married on July 3, 2026, in a highly publicized private ceremony at Madison Square Garden in New York City.

The Tortured Poets Department was released on April 19, 2024. The same day, it was expanded into a double album, subtitled The Anthology. It became the first album to surpass one billion streams on Spotify in a single week and accumulated 4 million units worldwide within its first release week. In the US, The Tortured Poets Department debuted atop the Billboard 200 with 2.6 million first-week units and stayed at number one for seventeen weeks, becoming Swift's longest-running number-one album. It was the global best-selling album of 2024, with 5.6 million pure copies sold. Its songs made Swift the first artist to monopolize the top 14 positions of the Billboard Hot 100 in the same week; the lead single, "Fortnight", reached number one, while the second single, "I Can Do It with a Broken Heart", peaked at number three. In May 2025, Swift finalized the purchase of the masters to her first six original albums from Shamrock Holdings, which had acquired them from Braun in 2020.

The Life of a Showgirl was released on October 3, 2025, accompanied by the promotional film Taylor Swift: The Official Release Party of a Showgirl, which grossed $50 million worldwide. The album debuted atop the Billboard 200 with 4 million first-week units, including 3.4 million pure sales, becoming the fastest-selling album in US history. It was the global best-selling album of 2025, with 6.05 million pure copies sold. Its tracks occupied the top 12 spots of the Billboard Hot 100, the Canadian Hot 100, and the Australian Singles Chart. The singles "The Fate of Ophelia" and "Opalite" both reached number one in the US and the UK, while the third single, "Elizabeth Taylor", peaked at number three on the Hot 100.

In 2026, Swift co-wrote and recorded "I Knew It, I Knew You" for the soundtrack to the animated film Toy Story 5; it debuted atop the Billboard Hot 100, becoming the first song from a Disney film to do so. She released the reissue of The Life of a Showgirl, subtitled The Encore, on September 25, 2026. It contains four additional songs, including the Hot 100 number-one single "Patient Zero". Swift received five nominations at the 69th Annual Grammy Awards, including Album of the Year (The Life of a Showgirl), Song of the Year ("I Knew It, I Knew You"), and Record of the Year ("The Fate of Ophelia"). She became the first artist to be nominated in all three categories in five different years.

== Artistry ==
=== Musical styles ===
With continuous musical reinventions, Swift has been described as a "musical chameleon" by journalists and music analysts alike. Her discography primarily spans country, pop, and folk genres, incorporating various styles such as country pop, country rock, electropop, indie rock, pop rock, soft rock, and synth-pop, with elements of electronica, hip-hop, R&B, and rock. Swift self-identified as a country musician with her first four albums, influenced by 1990s female country artists such as Shania Twain, Faith Hill, LeAnn Rimes, and the Dixie Chicks, as well as Keith Urban's incorporation of rock, pop, and blues into country music. The albums feature a country pop sound defined by instruments such as the six-string banjo, mandolin, and fiddle, a slight twang in Swift's vocals, and pop rock melodies; Speak Now expanded this sound with 1970s and 1980s rock influences, including pop-punk and arena rock. Some critics argued that country signified Swift's songwriting more than her musical style, and accused her of causing mainstream country to stray from its roots.

Red's incorporation of eclectic pop and rock styles, including Britrock, dance-pop, and dubstep, led to a critical debate over Swift's status as a country musician. Swift then chose 1980s synth-pop to recalibrate her artistic identity, inspired by the music of Phil Collins, Annie Lennox, Peter Gabriel, and Madonna. 1989, the first album in this direction, incorporates electronic arrangements consisting of dense synthesizers and drum machines. Swift expanded on the electronic production on her next albums. Reputation features a trap-pop production with elements of hip-hop, R&B, and EDM, and maximalist arrangements of heavy bass and manipulated vocals. Lover is a pop album with a 1980s-influenced sound combining dream pop, synth-pop, and pop rock. Midnights and The Tortured Poets Department both have a minimalist synth-pop sound characterized by analog synthesizers, sustained bass notes, and simple drum machine patterns, although The Tortured Poets Department features a more understated production. The Life of a Showgirl incorporates pop and soft rock, featuring new wave-leaning compositions and prominent acoustic guitars. When Swift embraced a pop identity, rockist critics regarded it as an erosion of her country songwriting authenticity, while others considered it necessary for her artistic evolution and defended her as a pioneer of poptimism.

Her 2020 albums Folklore and Evermore, described by some critics as "alternative", explore indie folk and rock styles. They incorporate a subtle, stripped-back soundscape with orchestrations, muted synthesizers, and drum pads. Evermore experiments with varied song structures, asymmetric time signatures, and diverse instruments. Critics deemed the indie styles a mature representation of Swift's singer-songwriter status and credited her with popularizing "alternative" music, although there was disagreement over this description.

=== Voice ===
"Our Song" (2006)
Swift sings with a Southern accent and a light country twang in "Our Song".

"Cardigan" (2020)
Swift sings in her lower register in the indie folk ballad "Cardigan".

"Lavender Haze" (2022)
The R&B-leaning pop track "Lavender Haze" features Swift's falsetto vocals.

Swift possesses a mezzo-soprano singing voice, but she mostly sings in her alto range. Her pitch, dialect, and accent have undergone many changes throughout her career. Reviews of her early country albums criticized her vocals as weak and strained compared to those of other female country singers. Defenders of Swift appreciated that she refrained from correcting her pitch with Auto-Tune and that she prioritized intimacy and emotion to communicate the messages of her songs with her audience, a style that critics have described as conversational. According to the critic Ann Powers, this singing style is demonstrated through Swift's attention to detail, which conveys an exact feeling—"the subtle adjustment of words and phrases to suggest moods like doubt, hope, and intimacy".

On Red and 1989, Swift's vocals are processed with electronic effects, such as synthesizer tweaking, looping, and multitracking, to accompany the pop production. Her voice on Reputation and Midnights incorporates hip-hop and R&B influences, resulting in a near-rap delivery that emphasizes rhythm and cadence over melody. She uses her lower register vocals extensively in Folklore and both her lower and upper registers in Evermore; the musicologist Alyssa Barca described her timbre in the upper register as "breathy and bright" and the lower register as "full and dark".

Swift's vocals have received more positive assessments since Folklore. The critic Amanda Petrusich commented in 2023 that her singing had become richer, with greater clarity and a stronger tone, even in live performances. Rolling Stone ranked her 102nd on their 2023 list "The 200 Greatest Singers of All Time"; the magazine argued that her breathy timbre allows for a broad range of delivery and commented: "A decade ago, including her on this list would have been a controversial move, but recent releases like Folklore, Evermore, and Midnights officially settled the argument." Powers attributed Swift's vocal versatility to her evolving artistry, mentioning her use of hip-hop cadences and country-influenced timbre.

=== Songwriting ===
Swift is credited as the lead songwriter on every song she has released and as the sole songwriter on over 60 tracks. Her fascination with songwriting began in her childhood; she credited her mother with igniting her early interest by helping her prepare for class presentations, and she would make up lyrics to Disney soundtrack songs once she had run out of words while singing them. Her early influences included the country musicians Patsy Cline, Loretta Lynn, Tammy Wynette, and Dolly Parton; the singer-songwriters Joni Mitchell, Melissa Etheridge, Sarah McLachlan, and Alanis Morissette; and the emo musicians Pete Wentz of Fall Out Boy and Chris Carrabba of Dashboard Confessional. She credited songs by the Dixie Chicks, Jeannie C. Riley, and Kenny Chesney with influencing her approach to narrative songwriting, and listed Paul McCartney, Bruce Springsteen, Emmylou Harris, and Kris Kristofferson as career role models for their consistent and evolving songwriting.

Swift considers herself a songwriter first and foremost. She divides her lyrics into three types: "quill lyrics", which feature antiquated words and phrasing; "fountain pen lyrics", which combine modern storylines with poetic twists and vivid imagery; and "glitter gel pen lyrics", which are lively and frivolous. Swift has used songwriting to cope with personal experiences; her songs are largely autobiographical and feature narratives that mostly revolve around love and romantic relationships. In her songwriting process, she would start by identifying an emotion she wanted to convey, and the story and melody would follow. Swift has characterized her songwriting as "confessional", and academics have linked her style to confessional poetry, noting that her songs reference personal events and express her internal feelings to her audience.

Where Taylor Swift and Fearless are rooted in adolescent feelings and detail an optimistic romance inspired by fairy tales, Speak Now reflects Swift's young adulthood, offering newfound wisdom on real-life heartbreak. Speak Now marked the beginning of increasingly intense media speculation about the subjects of her songs, particularly her dating history; Swift has described such scrutiny as sexist. Red explores the tumult of an intense breakup, and 1989 reflects on failed relationships with a wistful perspective; both incorporate lyrics that hint at sex, reflecting her personal growth. Reputation addresses the public controversies that tarnished Swift's wholesome image while portraying a blossoming romance with intimacy and vulnerability; its extensive references to sex and alcohol marked a departure from the youthful innocence that had informed her past albums. Swift described Lover as a "love letter to love", inspired by her realization of "love that was very real".

On Folklore and Evermore, Swift was inspired by escapism and romanticism to explore fictional narratives. She imposed her emotions onto imagined characters and story arcs, inspired by authors and poets of romantic and modernist literature like F. Scott Fitzgerald, Robert Frost, William Wordsworth, and Emily Dickinson; the last of whom was a distant cousin of Swift. The albums' characters construct their narratives from fragments of memory, symbolizing the nature of folktales and oral traditions that endure over time. Swift returned to autobiographical songwriting on Midnights, whose nocturnal ruminations encompass regrets and fantasies informed by her awareness of fame. The Tortured Poets Department explores heartbreak and other themes to extremes, including erotic desire, forbidden love, and escaping the public spotlight, while The Life of a Showgirl draws on Swift's experiences during the Eras Tour as informed by her fame and romantic life.

Critical reception of Swift's songwriting has been largely positive, and her melodic compositions have been highlighted for optimizing the verse-chorus form with memorable bridges. Several scholars have credited her with taking the confessional singer-songwriter tradition to new heights, and journalists have variously described her as a "poet laureate"—of puberty, of romance, and of her generation. In the view of the literary critic Stephanie Burt, Swift's writing is proficient at "placing inventive, evocative language into pop melodies designed to be sung". Some critics have dismissed her "confessional" style as material for tabloid gossip. Objection to the perceived poetic value of her songs, mostly from rockist critics, views her as a pop star using literary subtexts as a commercial ploy, with metaphors that are at times imprecise or self-indulgent. Scholars have attributed such criticisms to sexism. The musicologist Travis Stimeling argued that while Swift's autobiographical authenticity fits country and rock standards, her mostly male detractors view her depictions of young women's experiences as trivial and unworthy of serious merit. According to the English-language academic Ryan Hibbett, this gendered criticism bars Swift from receiving the artistic credentials granted to figures such as Bob Dylan, whose romantic themes and occasional literary imprecisions are not as harshly criticized.

=== Performances and stage ===
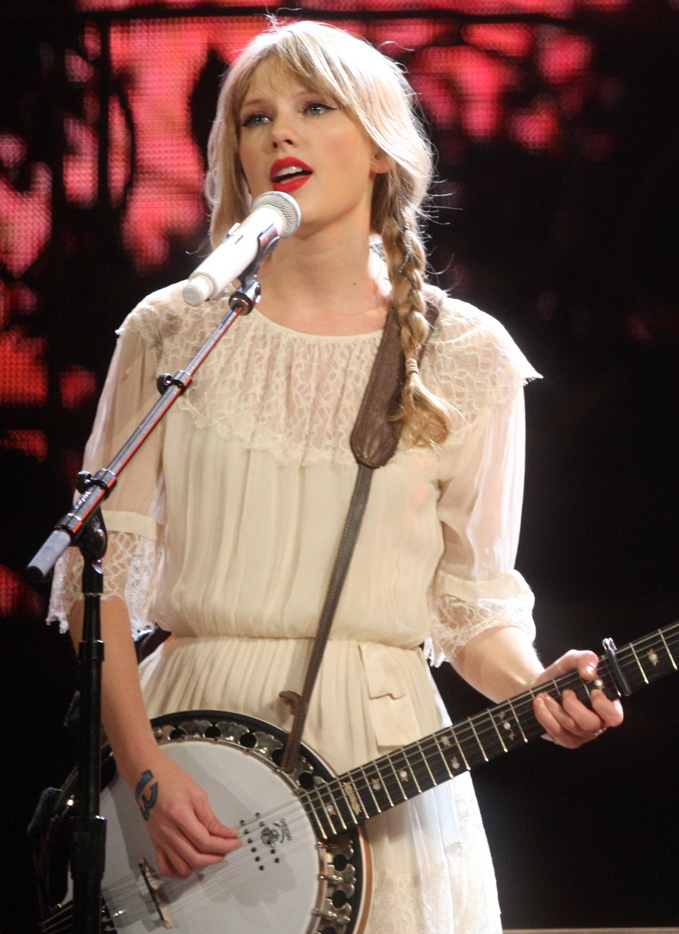
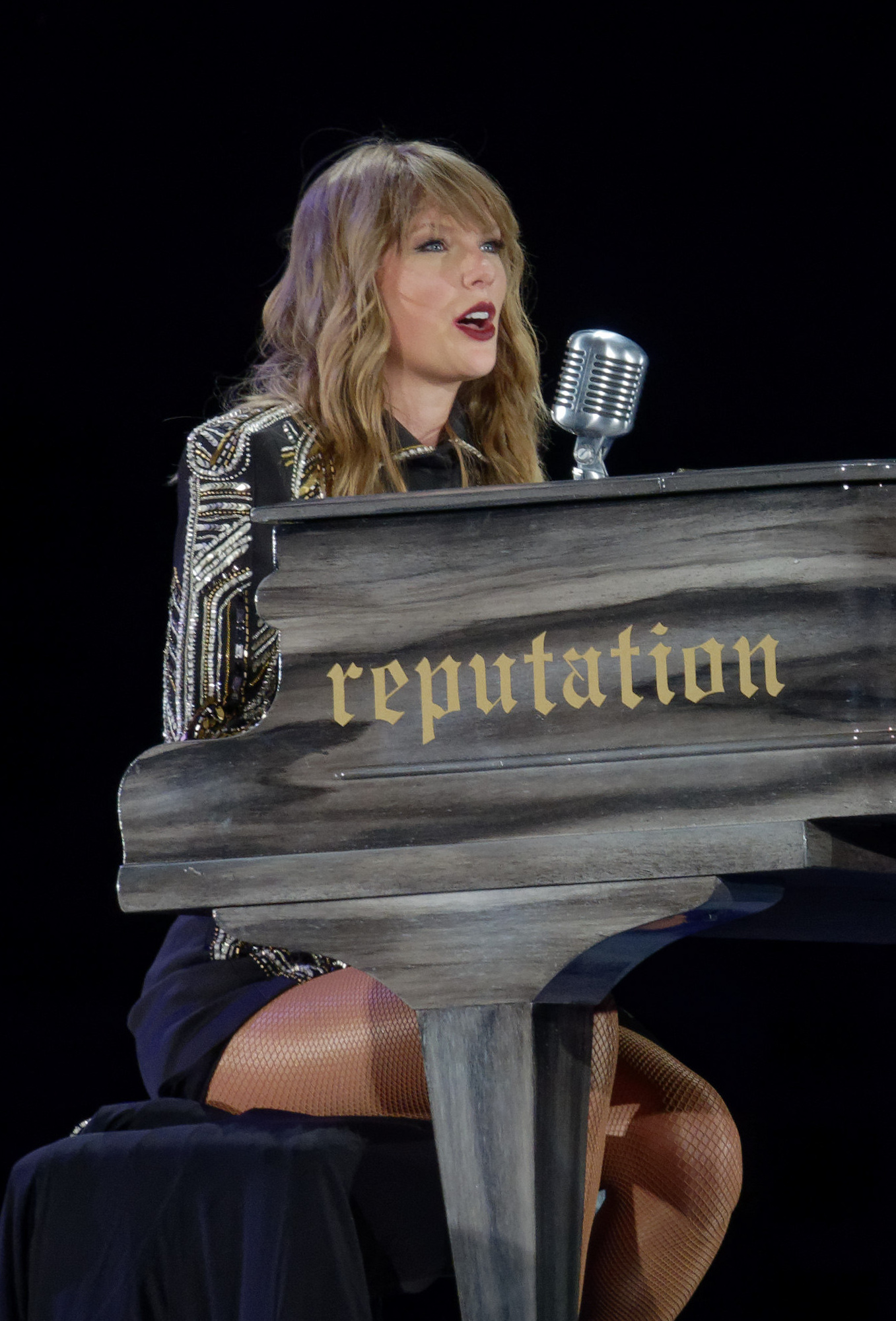
Swift playing a six-string banjo on the Speak Now World Tour (left, pictured in 2012) and a piano on the Reputation Stadium Tour (right, 2018)

Swift's concerts feature elaborate settings that incorporate elements of Broadway theatre and high tech. She does not rely on elaborate choreography and instead emphasizes connecting emotionally with her audience through storytelling and vocal delivery. Swift has used special guests and surprise songs or covers as recurring elements of her concerts; the acoustic "surprise song" segment, which originated during the Speak Now World Tour, has become a fan favorite and one of the most anticipated parts of her shows. Since 2007, she has toured with the same live band. She plays four instruments live: guitar (including electric, acoustic six-string, and twelve-string), six-string banjo, piano, and ukulele.

Critics have praised her stage presence, stamina, and ability to bring forth an intimate atmosphere for her audience, even in stadium settings. The critic Sasha Frere-Jones hailed her in 2008 as a "preternaturally skilled" entertainer who exerted professionalism with a vibrant energy. The journalist Sam Lansky wrote in 2023: "Swift is many things onstage—vulnerable and triumphant, playful and sad—but the intimacy of her songcraft is front and center."

=== Videos and filmmaking ===
Swift emphasizes visuals as a key creative component of her music. She established her production company, Taylor Swift Productions, in 2008. Her directorial debut was the music video for "Mine", co-directed with Roman White, in 2010; and she developed the concept and treatment for "Mean" in 2011. For the music videos of the 1989 and Reputation singles, she collaborated extensively with the director Joseph Kahn on eight videos; among them, she produced "Bad Blood", which won Best Music Video at the Grammy Awards in 2016. She worked with American Express for the "Blank Space" music video (which Kahn directed) and served as executive producer for the interactive app AMEX Unstaged: Taylor Swift Experience, for which she won a Primetime Emmy Award for Outstanding Interactive Program in 2015.

Swift has directed 16 of her music videos. "The Man" was her first solo directorial work and made her the first female artist to win the MTV Video Music Award for Best Direction. All Too Well: The Short Film, her filmmaking debut, made her the first artist to win the Grammy Award for Best Music Video as a solo director. In June 2023, Swift was invited to the Academy of Motion Picture Arts and Sciences. She has cited Joseph Kahn, Chloé Zhao, Greta Gerwig, Nora Ephron, Guillermo del Toro, John Cassavetes, and Noah Baumbach as filmmaking influences.

== Achievements ==
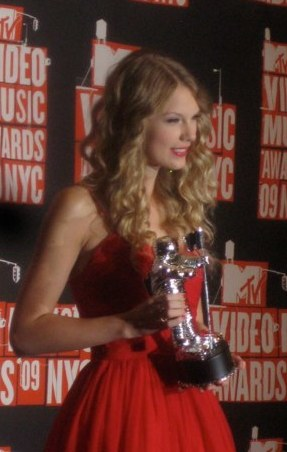
Swift with her Best Female Video trophy at the 2009 MTV Video Music Awards

Swift has won 14 Grammy Awards, including a record four Album of the Year wins; she has also received a record nine nominations for Song of the Year. Swift has additionally won 12 Country Music Association Awards, 8 Academy of Country Music Awards, 2 Brit Awards, and an Emmy Award. She is the most-awarded artist of the American Music Awards (40 wins), the Billboard Music Awards (49), and the MTV Video Music Awards (33). Swift is the first woman to be honored with the Pinnacle Award by the Country Music Association Awards in 2013 and with the Global Icon Award by the Brit Awards in 2021. At the 2026 MTV Video Music Awards, she became the first artist to receive the MTV VMA Artist Director Honors.

The youngest person on Rolling Stone's list "The 100 Greatest Songwriters of All Time" (2015), Swift was also named to The New York Times' list "The 30 Greatest Living American Songwriters" (2026), determined by votes from six of its critics and over 250 music experts. At the 64th BMI Pop Awards in 2016, Swift became the first female songwriter to receive an award named after its recipient. She received the Songwriter Icon Award from the National Music Publishers' Association in 2021 and was named Songwriter-Artist of the Decade by the Nashville Songwriters Association International in 2022. Swift is the youngest female inductee into the Songwriters Hall of Fame and the youngest inductee into the Nashville Songwriters Hall of Fame (both 2026), entering each in her first year of eligibility. She is set to be inducted into the Central Pennsylvania Music Hall of Fame in 2027.

The International Federation of the Phonographic Industry (IFPI) has named Swift the Global Recording Artist of the Year a record six times (2014, 2019, 2022–2025). She is the most-streamed artist of all time on Spotify as of April 2026, the most-streamed female artist of all time on Apple Music as of June 2026, and the highest-grossing touring act of all time, with cumulative revenue at $3.12 billion as of December 2024. Her chart records include the most number-one albums in the UK for a female artist and for a non-British artist; the most number ones on the Irish Albums Chart; the first artist to occupy the top five of the Australian albums chart, doing so twice, and the top 10 positions on the Australian singles chart; the most number-one songs on the Canadian Hot 100; and the most entries, most top-10 entries, and most number-one entries (tied with BTS) on the Billboard Global 200.

In the US, Swift has sold 116.7 million album units, including 54 million pure sales, as of May 2025. She is the solo artist with the most Billboard 200 number-one albums (15, tied with Drake) and the most weeks at number one on the chart (101); the artist with the most Billboard Hot 100 number-one debuts (10, tied with Drake) and the most number-one songs on Adult Pop Airplay and Pop Airplay (both 16); the first living artist to chart five albums in the top 10 of the Billboard 200; and the first artist to spend one hundred weeks atop the Billboard Artist 100. Swift is the first woman to have both an album and a song receive diamond certifications from the Recording Industry Association of America (RIAA), and also to have 100 million RIAA-certified album units. Billboard ranked Swift at number eight on its list "Greatest of All Time Artists" (2019), number three on "Top Country Artists of the 21st Century" (2025), number two on "Greatest Pop Stars of the 21st Century" (2024), and number one on "Top 100 Women Artists of the 21st Century" and "Top Artists of the 21st Century" (both 2025).

Swift has appeared in power listings. In 2024, she became the first solo artist to top Billboard's annual Power 100 ranking of the top music industry executives. Time included her on its annual list of the 100 most influential people in 2010, 2015, and 2019. Swift was one of the "Silence Breakers" that the magazine spotlighted as Person of the Year in 2017 for speaking up about sexual assault. In 2023, she became the first individual from the arts to be named Time Person of the Year and the first woman to appear on a Person of the Year cover more than once. Swift received an honorary Doctor of Fine Arts degree from New York University and served as its commencement speaker on May 18, 2022.

== Public image ==
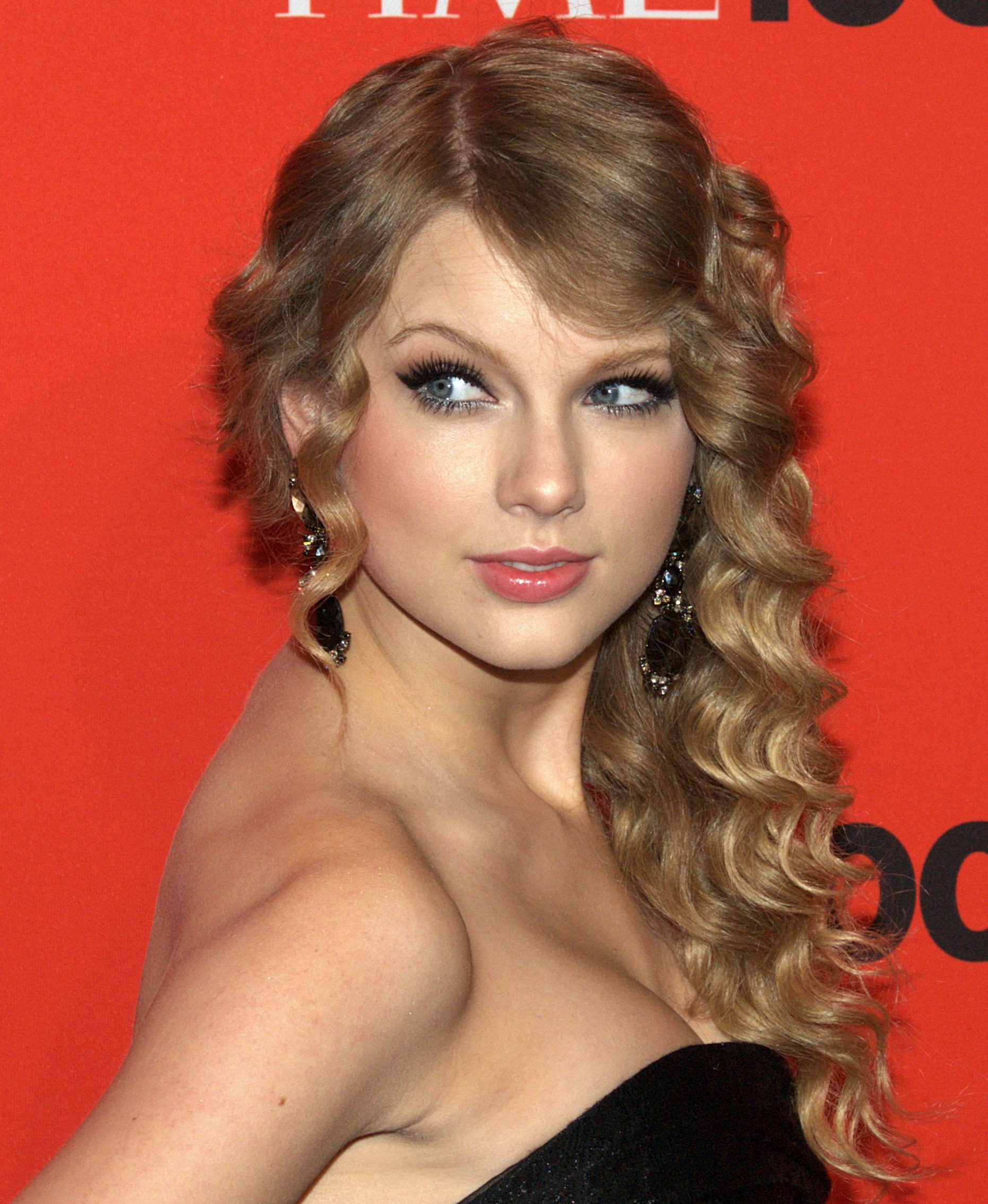
Swift at the 2010 Time 100 Gala

Swift is an enduring figure of 21st-century popular culture. Her career trajectory from a country singer-songwriter to a pop star in the 2000s and 2010s was the subject of extensive commentary. Deemed "America's Sweetheart" in her early career, she was described in the press as a "media darling" with a girl-next-door's polite demeanor and open-hearted conversations. Swift displayed a feminine image but refrained from the "aggressively sexualized feminist pop" of her contemporaries, leading publications to comment that her sex appeal was modest, subtle, and sophisticated. The adolescent themes of Swift's music contributed to her status as a teen idol, although several feminist authors at the time took issue with her songs about romantic relationships as narrow-minded and detrimental to girls and women, who made up the majority of her fanbase known as Swifties. Retrospective commentary has largely praised Swift's works for tackling topics of femininity, gaslighting, mistreatment, and patriarchy.

Upon recalibrating her artistry to pop music, Swift has identified as a feminist and achieved a pop icon status. In 2013, the author Jody Rosen labelled Swift the "Queen of Pop" due to her popularity that defied traditional boundaries between "genres, eras, demographics, paradigms, trends". Her feminist public image garnered varied reactions from the public, including praise for her success in a male-dominated music industry as an inspiration for girls and women, and criticism that dismissed her feminist adoption as superficial and self-interested.

The 2016 dispute with Kanye West bolstered the narrative among Swift's detractors that she was a calculating and manipulative woman despite her sweetheart image, and deepened their feud that has resonated in their respective careers. Her artistic reinventions in the 2020s turned her into an acclaimed singer-songwriter. Buoyed by her enduring pop stardom, she has been recognized as a rare phenomenon that combines the pop star and singer-songwriter archetypes with unprecedented success.

Swift is a known triskaidekaphile, using the number 13 in her various works. She has also openly embraced the cat lady archetype, featured or referencing her cats in her works and music videos.

== Cultural impact ==
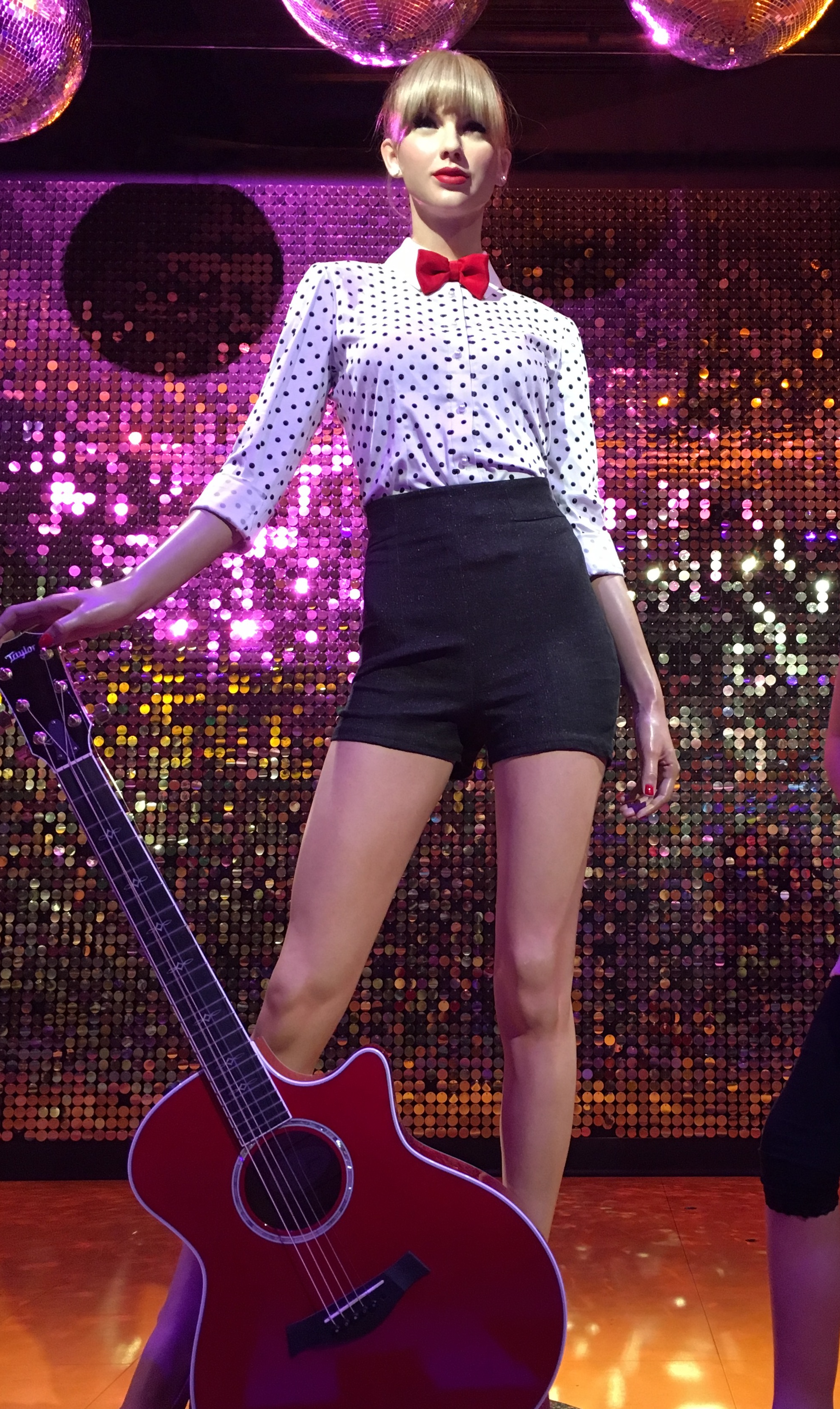
Wax figure of Swift at Madame Tussauds Sydney

Swift is one of the few artists to have consistently sold millions of albums across two decades despite the post-album era decline in record sales. Academics and journalists have therefore described her as "the last pop superstar" and "the last great rock star" of the 21st century. Her commercial strategies for albums and concert tickets have earned her a reputation as a savvy businesswoman, and her use of physical album variants and Easter eggs have become indicative of music marketing trends. The economist Alan Krueger described Swift as an "economic genius". Billboard has considered her one of the few artists who can simultaneously achieve chart success, critical acclaim, and fan support, and popularize any sound in mainstream music.

Swift's success in country music has been credited with popularizing the genre beyond the US and introducing it to adolescent women, a previously ignored demographic. The critic Kelefa Sanneh described her as the biggest country star since Garth Brooks, "and maybe since before him, too". Swift's guitar performances has resulted in increasing sales of guitars among women, which the media dubbed the "Taylor Swift factor". Her transition from country to pop has been credited as the catalyst for poptimism, and her songwriting and musical transitions have been credited with influencing a new generation of artists.

Swift's enduring popularity, particularly among women, has contributed to her status as a representation of millennials, or, more broadly, of her generation's zeitgeist. Her fanbase has been described by academics and journalists as one of the most loyal and dedicated. Time's Cady Lang credited Swift's sustained superstardom to her "savvy manipulation of both the industry and [her] personal brand". According to the popular-culture scholars Mary Fogarty and Gina Arnold, Swift is arguably the singular artist "whose story encapsulates many of the urgent conflicts in early twenty-first-century American culture". In a 2024 article for The New York Times, Joe Coscarelli wrote that her lasting popularity provoked debates comparing her not only to contemporaries like Drake or Beyoncé, but also to veteran artists like the Beatles, Michael Jackson, Elton John, or Madonna.

Swift's advocacy for artists' rights and re-recording projects have contributed to industry-wide discourses and reforms. Her artistry and career maneuvers have been the subject of various university courses in literary, cultural, and sociopolitical contexts. Swift's legacy has been both embraced and critiqued by groups ranging from feminist and queer communities to far-right and religious organizations, and studied by experts across various fields including musicology, literature, sociology, media theory, linguistics, and culture studies.

== Wealth and endorsements ==
Through her management company, TAS Rights Management, LLC, Swift has filed over 300 trademark applications in the US and holds more than 400 registrations worldwide, as of August 2025. Her filings include her name "Taylor Swift", her fanbase name "Swifties", album and tour titles, lyrics, slogans, artwork, and her cats' names. In 2026, Swift filed to trademark her voice and appearance against AI-generated reproductions, following unauthorized uses of her likeness in deepfake pornography and presidential election advertisements.

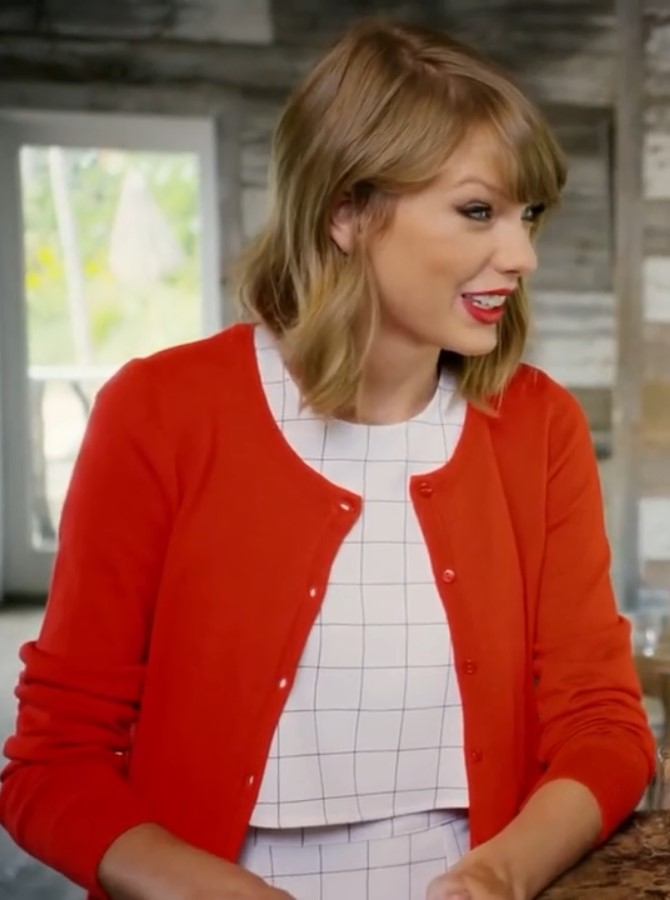
Swift in a promotional video for Keds in 2015

Swift was listed by Forbes as the world's highest-paid musician in 2016 and 2019, the highest-paid female musician of the 2010s, and the highest-paid female musician in 2021, 2022, and 2025. In October 2023, it was reported that Swift had become a billionaire. She was recognized as the first billionaire "primarily based on her songs and performances", with the majority of her sum coming from her releases and tours. As of July 2026, Forbes estimated her net worth at $2.1 billion, making her the world's richest female musician; the estimate included a $900 million music catalog and a $100 million real estate portfolio that spans Nashville, New York City, Los Angeles (Samuel Goldwyn Estate), and Rhode Island (High Watch).

Swift's use of private jets has drawn scrutiny for its carbon emissions. In 2023, a spokesperson for Swift stated that she had purchased more than double the required carbon credits to offset all tour travel and personal flights. In December 2023, Swift's lawyers sent a cease and desist letter to the American programmer Jack Sweeney, who uses publicly available data to track her private jet, alleging stalking and safety risks. In February 2024, it was reported that Swift had sold one of her two private jets.

Swift's album rollouts typically consist of multimedia promotional activities involving corporate tie-ins and product endorsements. Target is a long-standing business partner with Swift, offering exclusive physical albums and merchandise. In 2008–2011, her albums and tours were promoted with self-designed dolls with Jakks Pacific, fragrances with Elizabeth Arden, clothes with L.E.I., and holiday cards with American Greetings. Her partnership deals also included makeup products for CoverGirl and Cyber-shot cameras for Sony Electronics. In 2012–2015, she had tie-ins with Starbucks, Keds, Subway, Diet Coke, Walgreens, Walmart, and Papa John's. Other partnerships included New York City naming her its tourism ambassador in 2014, an exclusive Apple Music streaming deal in 2015, a multi-year AT&T deal in 2016, a United Parcel Service album distribution deal in 2017, and a multi-year Capital One deal and a clothing line with Stella McCartney in 2019. She became the first global ambassador for Record Store Day in 2022.

== Social activism ==
Swift avoided discussing politics in her early career. She said that she kept herself as educated as possible but did not want to influence others with her political opinions, later attributing her reluctance to the 2003 Dixie Chicks controversy and its impact on country musicians, especially women. Due to her apolitical stance, she was appropriated by the alt-right movement in the US, which sparked controversy. Swift voted for Barack Obama in the 2008 and 2012 US presidential elections, and for Hillary Clinton in the 2016 election; she did not publicly endorse Clinton because she believed that the backlash she was facing at the time could make her endorsement harmful to Clinton's likability.

Since 2018, Swift has been public about her political views and has abandoned her once-apolitical stance. She publicly endorsed two Democratic politicians for the 2018 US midterm elections, which resulted in headlines about how she finally dissociated herself from the alt-right and conservatives. In 2020, she urged her fans to check their voter registration ahead of elections, which resulted in 65,000 people registering to vote within one day of her post. Swift endorsed the Democratic ticket of Joe Biden and Kamala Harris in the 2020 US presidential election, and later endorsed Harris and Tim Walz for the 2024 election. She has openly criticized President Donald Trump and his policies.

A pro-choice feminist, Swift is a founding signatory of the Time's Up movement against sexual harassment and has criticized the US Supreme Court's 2022 decision to end federal abortion rights. A supporter of LGBTQ rights, she has donated to GLAAD and the Tennessee Equality Project, advocated for the Equality Act, and performed during WorldPride NYC 2019 at the Stonewall Inn, a gay rights monument. Swift has spoken up against white supremacy, racism, and police brutality in the US. She has donated to March for Our Lives and supported gun control and reform in the US, donated to the NAACP Legal Defense and Educational Fund and supported the Black Lives Matter movement, called for the removal of Confederate monuments in Tennessee, and advocated for Juneteenth to become a national holiday.

Swift's political engagements have been met with mixed reception: they have provoked further public discussion of political issues and empowered Swifties, but critics have questioned whether her political alignments were strategic in her career. While some publications have argued that Swift's stardom had a significant impact on political involvement in the US, others have viewed her influence as sizable but overstated. According to the popular culture scholar Simone Driessen, her political impact extended beyond the US to Australia and Europe.

== Philanthropy ==
Swift ranked first on DoSomething's "Gone Good" list in 2012, 2013, 2014, and 2015. She received the Star of Compassion from the Tennessee Disaster Services and the Big Help Award from the Nickelodeon Kids' Choice Awards for her "dedication to helping others" and "inspiring others through action". Especially early in her career, Swift donated to various relief funds following natural disasters. In 2009, she donated $100,000 to the Red Cross to help the victims of the Iowa flood of 2008. The same year, she performed at Sydney's Sound Relief concert, which raised money for those impacted by bushfires and flooding. In 2011, Swift used a dress rehearsal of her Speak Now tour as a benefit concert for victims of recent tornadoes in the US, raising more than $750,000. In response to the May 2010 Tennessee floods, she donated $500,000. In 2009, Swift sang at the BBC's Children in Need concert and raised £13,000 for the cause. In 2016, she donated $1 million to Louisiana flood relief efforts and $100,000 to the Dolly Parton Fire Fund. Swift donated to food banks after Hurricane Harvey struck Houston in 2017. She donated $1 million to Tennessee tornado relief in 2020 and again in 2023, as well as $5 million to relief efforts after Hurricane Helene and Hurricane Milton in 2024.

She has also donated to cancer research. As the recipient of the Academy of Country Music's Entertainer of the Year in 2011, Swift donated $25,000 to St. Jude Children's Research Hospital, Tennessee. In 2012, she participated in the Stand Up to Cancer telethon, performing the charity single "Ronan", which she wrote in memory of a four-year-old boy who died of neuroblastoma. She has also donated $100,000 to the V Foundation for Cancer Research and $50,000 to the Children's Hospital of Philadelphia. She has made donations to her fans several times to help cover their medical or academic expenses. During the COVID-19 pandemic, Swift donated to the World Health Organization and Feeding America and supported independent record stores. She performed "Soon You'll Get Better" on the One World: Together At Home television special, a benefit concert curated by Lady Gaga for Global Citizen to raise funds for the World Health Organization's COVID-19 Solidarity Response Fund.

Swift is a supporter of the arts. A benefactor of the Nashville Songwriters Hall of Fame, she has donated $75,000 to Hendersonville High School to help refurbish its auditorium; $4 million to the Country Music Hall of Fame and Museum in Nashville—the largest donation the museum had received from an artist—to establish the Taylor Swift Education Center, an exhibit and classroom space that opened in 2013; and $100,000 to the Nashville Symphony. In 2012, Swift partnered with Chegg for Good to donate $10,000 to the music departments of six US colleges.

Swift has also provided one-off donations. She has donated items, including signed guitars and concert tickets, to various charities for auction, among them MusiCares, Global's Make Some Noise, and Rare Impact Fund. In 2007, Swift partnered with the Tennessee Association of Chiefs of Police to launch a campaign to protect children from online predators. She has also encouraged youth to volunteer in their local communities as part of Global Youth Service Day. A promoter of children's literacy, Swift has donated money and books to schools across the US. In April 2018, Swift donated to the Rape, Abuse & Incest National Network in honor of Sexual Assault Awareness Month. She also donated to fellow singer-songwriter Kesha to help with her legal battles against Dr. Luke and to actress Mariska Hargitay's Joyful Heart Foundation.

Swift donated the equivalent of tens of thousands of meals to food banks at each stop of the Eras Tour; she also employed local businesses throughout the tour and gave $197 million in bonus payments to her entire crew. In February 2024, she donated $100,000 to the family of a woman who died in a shooting at the Kansas City Chiefs' Super Bowl parade. Swift donated $250,000 to Operation Breakthrough in December 2024; the funds were directed to workforce development, childcare, and early learning programs. In December 2025, she made donations to eight organizations including MusiCares, Operation Breakthrough, Feeding America, and the American Heart Association.

== Discography ==
Studio albums

- Taylor Swift (2006)
- Fearless (2008)
- Speak Now (2010)
- Red (2012)
- 1989 (2014)
- Reputation (2017)
- Lover (2019)
- Folklore (2020)
- Evermore (2020)
- Midnights (2022)
- The Tortured Poets Department (2024)
- The Life of a Showgirl (2025)

Re-recorded albums

- Fearless (Taylor's Version) (2021)
- Red (Taylor's Version) (2021)
- Speak Now (Taylor's Version) (2023)
- 1989 (Taylor's Version) (2023)

== Filmography ==
Films

- Valentine's Day (2010)
- The Lorax (2012)
- The Giver (2014)
- Cats (2019)
- All Too Well: The Short Film (2021)
- Amsterdam (2022)

Documentaries

- Miss Americana (2020)
- Taylor Swift: City of Lover (2020)
- Folklore: The Long Pond Studio Sessions (2020)
- Taylor Swift: The Eras Tour (2023)
- Taylor Swift: The Official Release Party of a Showgirl (2025)
- Taylor Swift: The End of an Era (2025)

== Tours ==
- Fearless Tour (2009–2010)
- Speak Now World Tour (2011–2012)
- The Red Tour (2013–2014)
- The 1989 World Tour (2015)
- Reputation Stadium Tour (2018)
- The Eras Tour (2023–2024)

== See also ==
- List of American Grammy Award winners and nominees
- List of celebrities by net worth
- List of music artists by net worth
- List of highest-certified music artists in the United States
