= As the Palaces Burn (film) =

Metal music documentary

- Directed by: Don Argott
- Produced by: Sheena M. Joyce
- Starring: Lamb of God
- Music by: Mark Morton
- Distributed by: Epic Records
- Release date: February 14, 2014
- Running time: 120 minutes
- Country: United States
- Language: English

As the Palaces Burn is a 2014 American documentary film about the heavy metal band Lamb of God, mainly focusing on vocalist Randy Blythe’s manslaughter case. The film was directed by Don Argott and the music was composed by the band’s guitarist, Mark Morton.

== Synopsis ==
As the Palaces Burn is split into two sections. The first part of the documentary is more light-hearted, highlighting the band’s fans from their 2012 international tour. The film starts with a profile of the band and then shows two fans, from India and Colombia, talking about the impact the band’s music had on them. The band is shown travelling across Europe on tour.

About 40 minutes into the film, the second half of the documentary begins and starts to take a more serious tone, focusing on vocalist Randy Blythe’s manslaughter case, giving a deep dive into his arrest, jail time, trial, and acquittal. Also shown are the perspectives of the other four band members as they auction off items to raise money for Blythe’s legal funds. The film ends with Blythe during his court hearing as he is told that he has been exonerated.

Additional appearances come from other musicians, such as Corey Taylor. The film also shines a light on and pays respects to the 19-year-old victim, Daniel Nosek.

== Cast ==
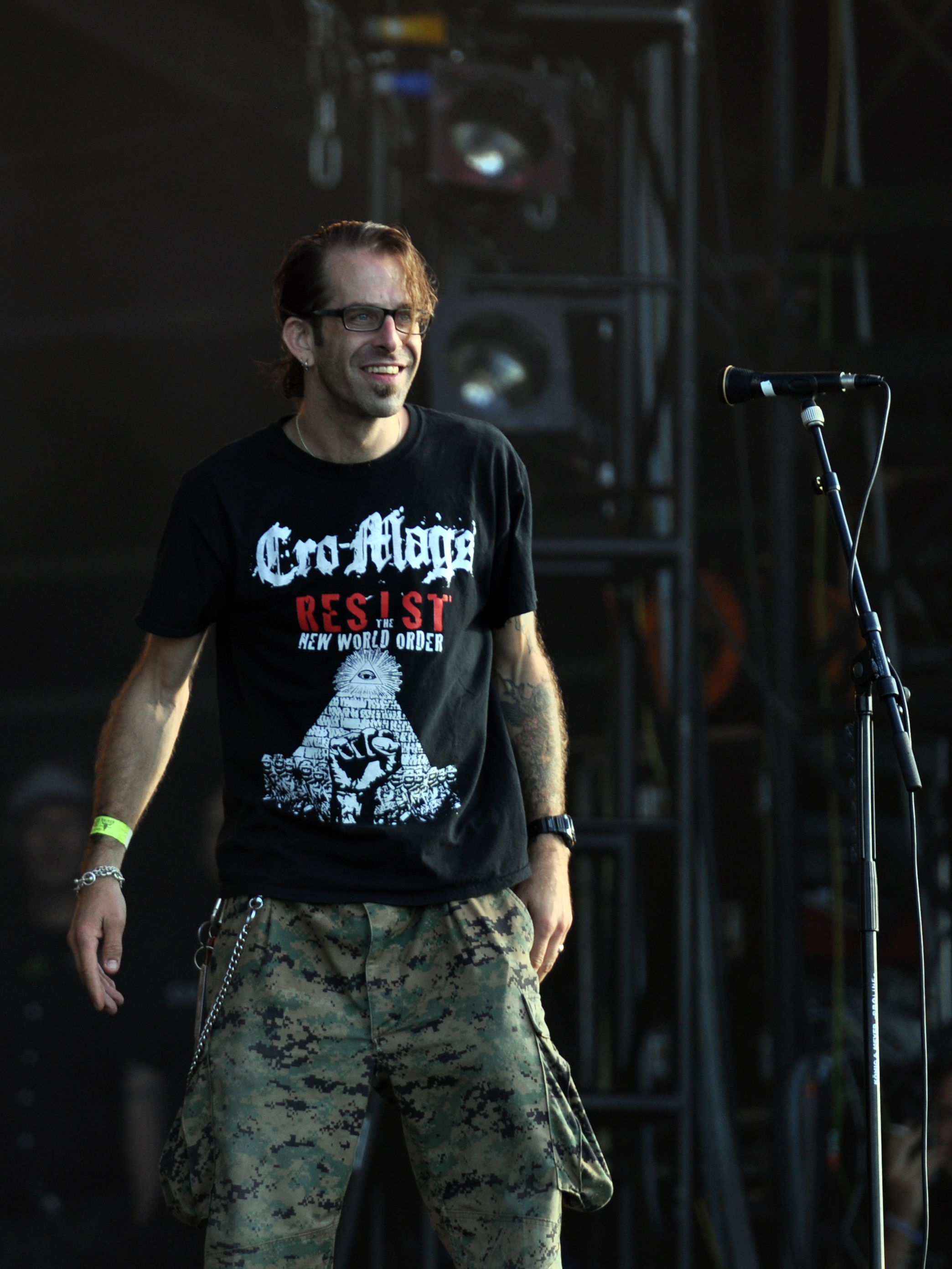
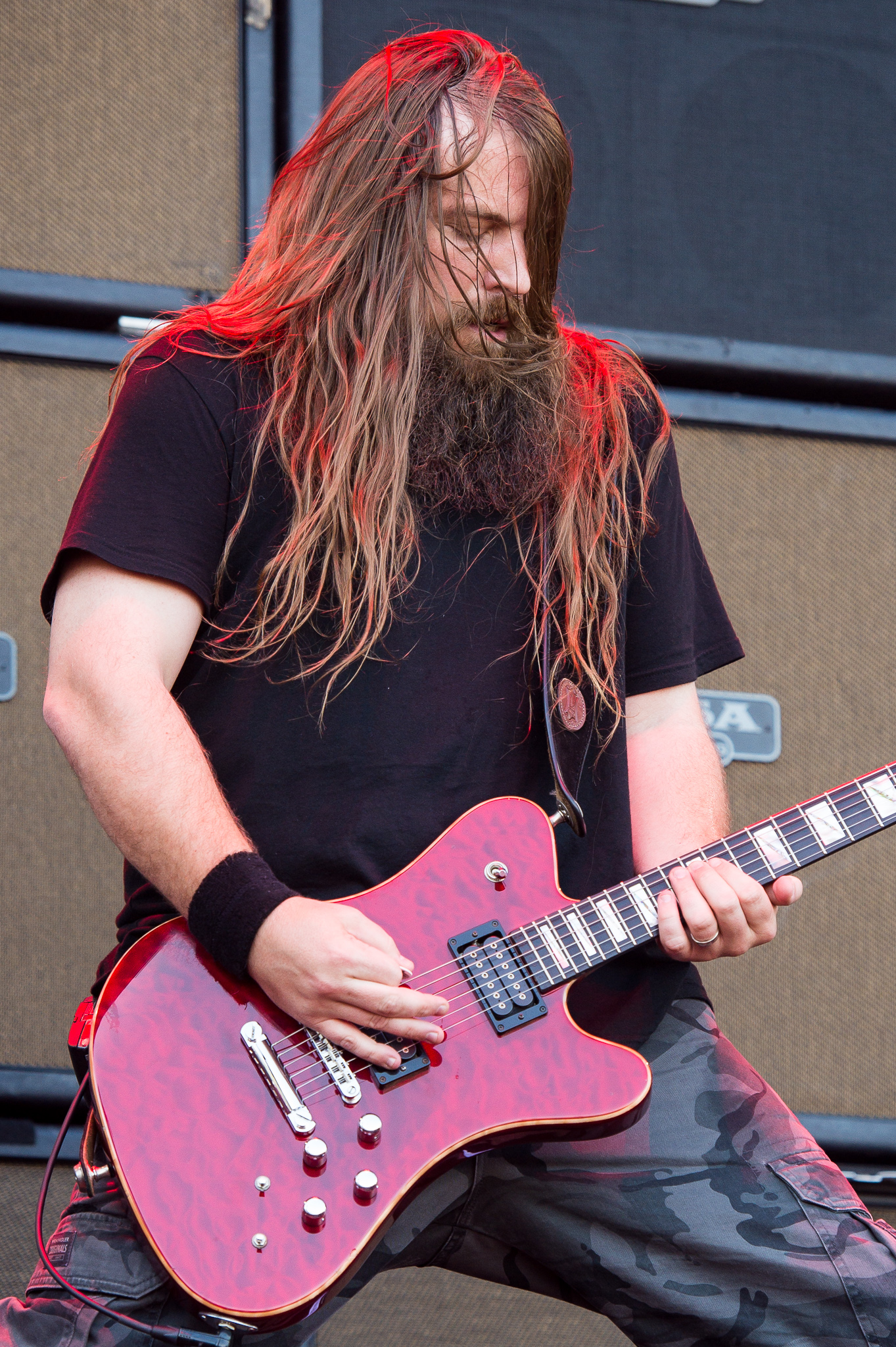
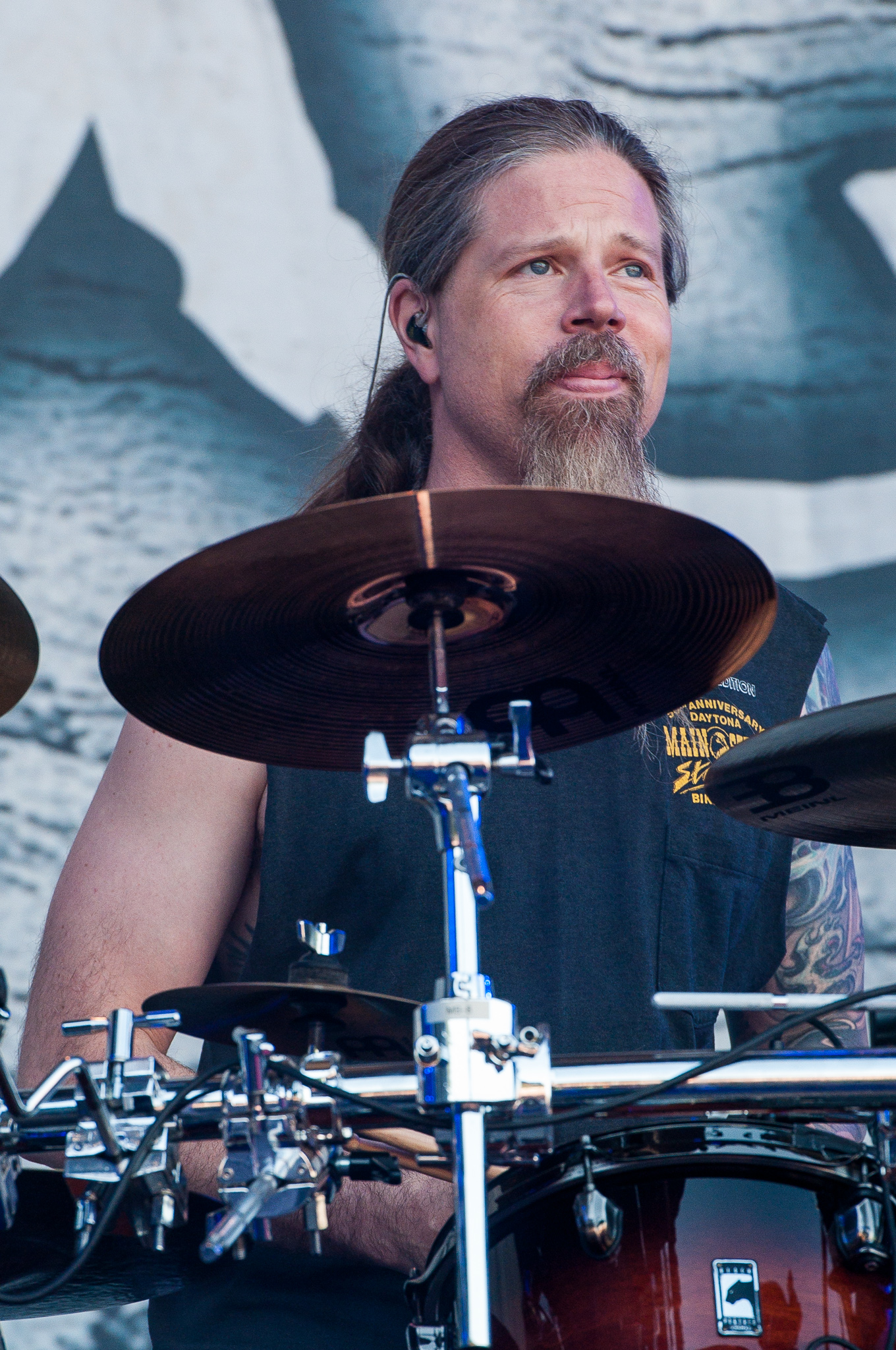
Left to right: Randy Blythe (pictured in 2016), Mark Morton (2015), and Chris Adler (2015)

Band members

- Chris Adler
- Willie Adler
- Randy Blythe
- John Campbell
- Mark Morton

Other musicians and appearances

- Dave Brockie
- Larry Mazer
- Jose Mangin
- Harley Flanagan
- Corey Taylor

Producers

- Don Argott — director
- Larry Mazer — executive producer
- Sheena M. Joyce — producer
- Mark Morton — composer
- Demian Fenton — editor
- Katie Griffin — casting director
- Jennifer Wessner — color department
- Chad Fisher — production assistant

== Production and Release ==
The documentary, directed by Don Argott, began filming in 2012 and was set to focus on fans of the band and their 2012 world tour. Argott’s original goal was to illustrate how Lamb of God, in particular, and metal in general unite fans in disparate countries. However, the plot was drastically altered near the end of production; lead singer Randy Blythe was arrested on charges of committing intentional bodily harm stemming from a concert in Prague two years earlier, when Blythe pushed 19-year-old Daniel Nosek off the stage. In 2014, Blythe told the Los Angeles Times that the change in the film’s direction was “irony at its heights,” as it went from celebrating the fans to discussing the death of one. Argott and his crew were with Blythe both during the trial and during his time at home. Some of the filming took place in the mountains and other outdoor areas, but for most of the recording, Blythe and Argott simply talked things out with one another.

Blythe he was going through a lot mentally during production and later stated "I was in prison, getting out of prison, and going through the trial, Had the director not been a friend of mine, I would have shut him out, physically and emotionally. It was a very serious situation."

As the Palaces Burn was officially released theatrically on February 27, 2014. On October 14, of that year the film was released on DVD via Epic records, it featured a bonus disc with two hours of unreleased footage.

== Reception ==
As the Palaces Burn was met with positive reception, it received a 80% on Metacritic and a 81% on Rotten Tomatoes.

The Hollywood Reporter gave the documentary a positive review stating "even if you already know how the case was resolved, As the Palaces Burn emerges as a gripping tale of a band whose existence was threatened by the very image they worked so hard to project." Graham Hartmann of Loudwire added "'As the Palaces Burn' is truly unique. The film's honesty fuels the viewing experience, documenting the abandonment of its own original concept without bailing on the fans. No matter how much you've read about Randy Blythe's Czech trial, 'As the Palaces Burn' offers a view never before experienced as Blythe extends his hand for a walk with him in Hell."

Stephen Miller of Metal Hammer gave the film a 4.5/5 claiming "As The Palaces Burn is a courageous, uplifting important and life-affirming look at one of the most troubled periods in the history of any band. It’s always more than just music and this is more than just a film." Robert Pasbani of Metal Injection wrote "If you followed this trial, you need to see this. If you are a Lamb of God fan, you absolutely need to see this. This trial is something that will be talked about for quite a while and this is the most definitive recounting of the entire ordeal told by the band who lived it. It gives you an incredibly honest look inside the world of the band and the insane rollercoaster ride the band and the family of Daniel Nosek went through."

The film was nominated for Best Film & Video at the 2014 Revolver Golden Gods Awards.
