= Kelce (film) =

- Directed by: Don Argott
- Produced by: Don Argott; Connor Barwin; Keith Cossrow; David Ellison; Sheena M. Joyce; Pat Kelleher; Ross Ketover; Larry Platt; Jesse Sisgold; Jon Weinback
- Cinematography: Jarred Alterman
- Edited by: Demian Fenton; Andrew Weigel
- Music by: West Dylan Thordson
- Distributed by: Amazon Prime Video
- Release date: September 12, 2023
- Running time: 103 minutes
- Country: United States
- Language: English

Kelce is a feature-length documentary film which follows Jason Kelce during the 2022 National Football League season. It was produced by Philadelphia-based studio 9.14 Pictures, Vera Y Productions, and NFL Films. It was released on Amazon Prime Video on September 11, 2023. Within 24 hours of its release, Kelce became the No. 1 most watched movie on Amazon in the United States. It was nominated for two Sports Emmy Awards in 2024.

It depicts Kelce in both his personal and professional life as he weighs the decision about whether to retire from the NFL. He frankly discusses balancing the financial benefits and the physical cost of playing in the NFL. Kelce is a famous underdog and the documentary has been described as the "most Philly sports movie ever" given Kelce's everyman likeable personality and underdog status.

The film culminates in Kelce playing against his brother Travis Kelce in Super Bowl LVII. They were the first brothers to play against each other in Super Bowl history and the game also became known as the "Kelce Bowl".
