= List of Hulu original films =

Beginning in 2019, streaming service Hulu began to produce its own original films. Its first film was Batman & Bill, a documentary about comic book writer Bill Finger. Its first narrative feature film was Little Monsters, an independently produced zombie comedy film.

On October 8, 2025, Hulu replaced Star on Disney+ in all territories outside of the United States except Japan, becoming a global brand, with films labeled as 'Star Original' being rebranded as 'Hulu Original' films.

== Original films ==
=== Feature films ===
Title	Release date	Genre	Runtime
Little Monsters	October 11, 2019	Horror comedy	1 h 34 min
Wounds	October 18, 2019	Horror	1 h 34 min
Big Time Adolescence	March 13, 2020	Coming-of-age comedy	1 h 31 min
Palm Springs	July 10, 2020	Romantic comedy	1 h 30 min
The Binge	August 28, 2020	Black comedy	1 h 38 min
Books of Blood	October 7, 2020	Horror anthology	1 h 47 min
Bad Hair	October 23, 2020	Satirical comedy horror	1 h 55 min
Run	November 20, 2020	Horror	1 h 30 min
Happiest Season	November 25, 2020	Christmas romantic comedy	1 h 42 min
The Ultimate Playlist of Noise	January 15, 2021	Musical comedy drama	1 h 39 min
The United States vs. Billie Holiday	February 26, 2021	Biographical drama	2 h 10 min
Boss Level	March 5, 2021	Science fiction action	1 h 40 min
Plan B	May 28, 2021	Comedy	1 h 48 min
False Positive	June 25, 2021	Horror	1 h 32 min
Vacation Friends	August 27, 2021	Comedy	1 h 45 min
Mother/Android	December 17, 2021	Science fiction thriller	1 h 50 min
Sex Appeal	January 14, 2022	Teen sex romantic comedy	1 h 30 min
No Exit	February 25, 2022	Horror	1 h 35 min
Fresh	March 4, 2022	Thriller	1 h 54 min
Deep Water	March 18, 2022	Erotic psychological thriller	1 h 55 min
Crush	April 29, 2022	Teen romantic comedy	1 h 32 min
The Valet	May 20, 2022	Romantic comedy	2 h 3 min
Fire Island	June 3, 2022	Romantic comedy	1 h 45 min
Good Luck to You, Leo Grande	June 17, 2022	Sex comedy drama	1 h 37 min
The Princess	July 1, 2022	Fantasy Action-thriller	1 h 34 min
Not Okay	July 29, 2022	Satirical Black comedy	1 h 43 min
Prey	August 5, 2022	Science fiction horror	1 h 39 min
Hellraiser	October 7, 2022	Horror	2 h
Grimcutty	October 10, 2022	Horror	1 h 41 min
Rosaline	October 14, 2022	Romantic comedy	1 h 37 min
Matriarch	October 21, 2022	Horror	1 h 25 min
Darby and the Dead	December 2, 2022	Supernatural teen comedy	1 h 40 min
It's a Wonderful Binge	December 9, 2022	Black comedy	1 h 38 min
The Drop	January 13, 2023	Black comedy	1 h 32 min
Three Ways	February 10, 2023	Romantic comedy	1 h 33 min
Bruiser	February 24, 2023	Drama	1 h 37 min
Boston Strangler	March 17, 2023	Historical crime thriller	1 h 53 min
Rye Lane	March 31, 2023	Romantic comedy	1 h 23 min
Quasi	April 20, 2023	Satirical comedy	1 h 40 min
Clock	April 28, 2023	Science fiction horror	1 h 33 min
White Men Can't Jump	May 19, 2023	Sports comedy	1 h 42 min
Flamin' Hot	June 9, 2023	Biopic	1 h 38 min
Jagged Mind	June 15, 2023	Psychological horror	1 h 28 min
Miguel Wants to Fight	August 16, 2023	Coming-of-age comedy	1 h 15 min
Vacation Friends 2	August 25, 2023	Comedy	1 h 46 min
No One Will Save You	September 22, 2023	Science fiction horror	1 h 33 min
Appendage	October 2, 2023	Horror comedy	1 h 34 min
The Mill	October 9, 2023	Science fiction thriller	1 h 46 min
Quiz Lady	November 3, 2023	Comedy	1 h 40 min
Suncoast	February 9, 2024	Coming-of-age drama	1 h 49 min
Prom Dates	May 3, 2024	Coming-of-age comedy	1 h 25 min
The Supremes at Earl's All-You-Can-Eat	August 23, 2024	Drama	2 h 5 min
She Taught Love	September 27, 2024	Romance	1 h 42 min
Hold Your Breath	October 3, 2024	Horror	1 h 36 min
Mr. Crocket	October 11, 2024	Horror	1 h 28 min
Carved	October 21, 2024	Horror comedy	1 h 34 min
Nutcrackers	November 29, 2024	Comedy drama	1 h 44 min
Control Freak	March 13, 2025	Horror	1 h 44 min
O'Dessa	March 20, 2025	Post-apocalyptic musical drama	1 h 46 min
Summer of 69	May 9, 2025	Coming-of-age sex comedy	1 h 40 min
Predator: Killer of Killers	June 6, 2025	Adult animated sci-fi action anthology	1 h 26 min
Eenie Meanie	August 22, 2025	Heist thriller	1 h 48 min
Swiped	September 19, 2025	Biopic	1 h 52 min
The Man in My Basement	September 26, 2025	Thriller	1 h 55 min
Stay	October 8, 2025	Horror	1 h 24 min
The Hand That Rocks the Cradle	October 22, 2025	Thriller	1 h 44 min
In the Blink of an Eye	February 27, 2026	Science fiction drama	1 h 35 min
Mike & Nick & Nick & Alice	March 27, 2026	Buddy action comedy	1 h 47 min
Pizza Movie	April 3, 2026	Comedy	1 h 38 min
Never Change!	June 17, 2026	Comedy	1 h 44 min
They Fight	July 17, 2026	Sports drama	1 h 36 min
The Last Scene	August 28, 2026	Fantasy romantic drama	1 h 37 min

=== Documentaries ===
Title	Release date	Runtime
Batman & Bill	May 6, 2017	1 h 32 min
Becoming Bond	May 20, 2017	1 h 35 min
Dumb: The Story of Big Brother Magazine	June 3, 2017	1 h 19 min
Too Funny to Fail	October 21, 2017	1 h 35 min
Obey Giant	November 11, 2017	1 h 32 min
March of the Penguins 2: The Next Step	March 23, 2018	1 h 24 min
Tiny Shoulders: Rethinking Barbie	April 27, 2018	1 h 32 min
Ballet Now	July 20, 2018	1 h 13 min
Minding the Gap	August 17, 2018	1 h 33 min
Crime + Punishment	August 24, 2018	1 h 52 min
Fyre Fraud	January 14, 2019	1 h 36 min
Ask Dr. Ruth	June 1, 2019	1 h 40 min
The Amazing Johnathan Documentary	August 16, 2019	1 h 31 min
Jawline	August 23, 2019	1 h 39 min
Untouchable	September 2, 2019	1 h 38 min
Margaret Atwood: A Word After a Word After a Word Is Power	March 20, 2020	1 h 33 min
We Are Freestyle Love Supreme	July 17, 2020	1 h 30 min
I Am Greta	November 13, 2020	1 h 37 min
69: The Saga of Danny Hernandez	November 16, 2020	1 h 42 min
Kid 90	March 12, 2021	1 h 11 min
WeWork: Or the Making and Breaking of a $47 Billion Unicorn	April 2, 2021	1 h 44 min
Changing the Game	June 1, 2021	1 h 28 min
Homeroom	August 12, 2021	1 h 30 min
Jacinta	October 8, 2021	1 h 45 min
The Informant: Fear and Faith in the Heartland	November 1, 2021	1 h 16 min
The Housewife & the Shah Shocker	November 29, 2021	48 min
Dead Asleep	December 16, 2021	1 h 26 min
Two Men at War	March 6, 2022	54 min
Look at Me	May 26, 2022	1 h 53 min
Leave No Trace	June 16, 2022	1 h 48 min
Machine Gun Kelly's Life in Pink	June 27, 2022	1 h 41 min
Aftershock	July 19, 2022	1 h 26 min
The Ivana Trump Story: The First Wife	July 22, 2022	47 min
God Forbid: The Sex Scandal That Brought Down a Dynasty	November 1, 2022	1 h 49 min
House of Grucci	January 2, 2023	49 min
Rap Trap: Hip Hop on Trial	February 23, 2023	51 min
Grand Knighthawk: Infiltrating the KKK	April 27, 2023	1 h 16 min
Aaron Carter: The Little Prince of Pop	May 1, 2023	56 min
Queenmaker: The Making of an It Girl	May 17, 2023	1 h 27 min
The Randall Scandal: Love, Loathing, and Vanderpump	May 22, 2023	1 h 30 min
Jelly Roll: Save Me	May 30, 2023	1 h 27 min
Anthem	June 28, 2023	1 h 39 min
CMA Fest: 50 Years of Fan Fair	July 5, 2023	1 h 15 min
The Jewel Thief	July 13, 2023	1 h 40 min
Sound of the Police	August 11, 2023	1 h 25 min
Trap Jazz	August 23, 2023	1 h 34 min
Monster Inside: America's Most Extreme Haunted House	October 12, 2023	1 h 27 min
The Lady Bird Diaries	November 13, 2023	1 h 40 min
Cypher	November 24, 2023	1 h 21 min
We Live Here: The Midwest	December 6, 2023	52 min
Sacred Soil: The Piney Woods School Story	February 23, 2024	1 h 45 min
Freaknik: The Wildest Party Never Told	March 21, 2024	1 h 22 min
Sins of the Parents: The Crumbley Trials	April 18, 2024	1 h
Hip-Hop and The White House	April 22, 2024	58 min
The Contestant	May 2, 2024	1 h 30 min
Making of an Activist	May 14, 2024	37 min
Lainey Wilson: Bell Bottom Country	May 29, 2024	1 h 6 min
Brats	June 13, 2024	1 h 32 min
Breakin' On The One	June 24, 2024	44 min
Diane von Furstenberg: Woman in Charge	June 25, 2024	1 h 37 min
Child Star	September 17, 2024	1 h 37 min
Patrice: The Movie	September 30, 2024	1 h 42 min
Fanatical: The Catfishing of Tegan and Sara	October 18, 2024	1 h 39 min
Road Diary: Bruce Springsteen and the E Street Band	October 25, 2024	1 h 39 min
Sly Lives! (aka The Burden of Black Genius)	February 13, 2025	1 h 52 min
Memes & Nightmares	February 20, 2025	1 h 21 min
Last Take: Rust and the Story of Halyna	March 11, 2025	1 h 30 min
The Quincy Avery Effect	April 23, 2025	1 h 31 min
Barbara Walters: Tell Me Everything	June 23, 2025	1 h 35 min
Ruby Red Handed: Stealing America's Most Famous Pair of Shoes	August 26, 2025	1 h 25 min
Imported	August 28, 2025	1 h 25 min
Blood & Myth	September 4, 2025	1 h 14 min
Lilith Fair: Building a Mystery	September 21, 2025	1 h 39 min
Hoops, Hopes & Dreams	January 19, 2026	21 min
Breaking Glass: The Pat Summitt Story	March 25, 2026	82 min
#SkyKing	April 14, 2026	1 h 31 min
Travis Barker: Louder Than Fear	August 13, 2026	1 h 41 min
The Swan: Behind the Mirror	September 29, 2026	1 h 40 min
Oasis: Don't Look Back in Anger	October 9, 2026	2 h 2 min
Clown Panic	October 12, 2026	1 h 24 min
Darius Rucker: They Called Me Hootie	November 16, 2026	1 h 31 min
Awaiting release
The Symphony of Dance	November 23, 2026	TBA

=== Specials ===
These programs are one-time events or supplementary content related to original films.

Title	Release date	Genre	Runtime
Derek DelGaudio's In & of Itself	January 22, 2021	Mentalism	1 h 30 min
Out of the Shadows: The Man Behind the Steele Dossier	October 18, 2021	Interview	1 h 6 min
Behind the Table: A View Reunion	June 20, 2022	Reunion	30 min
Huluween Dragstravaganza	October 1, 2022	Variety	42 min
The Paloni Show! Halloween Special	October 17, 2022	Animated sitcom	1 h 2 min
Imagine Dragons Live in Vegas	July 14, 2023	Concert	2 h
Family Guy: A Little Fright Music	October 14, 2024	Animated sitcom	21 min
Jim Gaffigan: The Skinny	November 22, 2024	Stand-up comedy	1 h
Family Guy: Gift of the White Guy	November 25, 2024	Animated sitcom	21 min
Ilana Glazer: Human Magic	December 20, 2024	Stand-up comedy	56 min
Roy Wood Jr.: Lonely Flowers	January 17, 2025	Stand-up comedy	1 h
Carrie Underwood: Reflection	January 24, 2025	Concert	1 h 32 min
Chris Distefano: It's Just Unfortunate	February 21, 2025	Stand-up comedy	52 min
Bill Burr: Drop Dead Years	March 14, 2025	Stand-up comedy	1 h 9 min
Jessica Kirson: I'm the Man	April 25, 2025	Stand-up comedy	48 min
Matteo Lane: The Al Dente Special	May 16, 2025	Stand-up comedy	58 min
Atsuko Okatsuka: Father	June 13, 2025	Stand-up comedy	1 h 2 min
Zarna Garg: Practical People Win	July 18, 2025	Stand-up comedy	1 h 7 min
Ralph Barbosa: Planet Bosa	August 8, 2025	Stand-up comedy	58 min
Andrew Santino: White Noise	September 12, 2025	Stand-up comedy	51 min
Family Guy: A Little Fright Music	October 6, 2025	Animated sitcom	21 min
Frankie Quiñones: Damn That's Crazy	October 10, 2025	Stand-up comedy	50 min
Sebastian Maniscalco: It Ain't Right	November 21, 2025	Stand-up comedy	57 min
Family Guy: Disney's Hulu's Family Guy's Hallmark Channel's Lifetime's Familiar Holiday Movie	November 28, 2025	Animated sitcom	21 min
Kumail Nanjiani: Night Thoughts	December 19, 2025	Stand-up comedy	57 min
Nikki Glaser: Good Girl	April 24, 2026	Stand-up comedy	58 min
Lisa Ann Walter: It Was an Accident	May 15, 2026	Stand-up comedy	56 min
Hannah Berner: None of My Business	June 5, 2026	Stand-up comedy	52 min
Vanessa Gonzalez: Mamona	September 15, 2026	Stand-up comedy	59 min
Family Guy: Happy Hell-o-ween	October 4, 2026	Animated sitcom	24 min
Jamie Foxx: Take Care of Yourself	October 7, 2026	Stand-up comedy	59 min
Heather McMahan: By a Thread	October 16, 2026	Stand-up comedy	1 h 4 min
Marrakech Comedy Festival	October 16, 2026	Stand-up comedy	1 h 30 min
Awaiting release
Bobby Lee: Finally	November 27, 2026	Stand-up comedy	TBA
Family Guy: The Peter Clause	November 30, 2026	Animated sitcom	TBA
Bob's Burgers: On the Fort Day of Christmas	December 7, 2026	Animated sitcom	TBA

== Co-distributed films ==
These films premiered in theatres, or in one film's case another streamer, but were co-distributed on Hulu when they received wide releases.

Title	Release date	Genre	Co-distributed with	Runtime
Summer of Soul	July 2, 2021	Documentary	Searchlight Pictures	1 h 57 min
On the Count of Three	August 17, 2022	Black comedy drama	United Artists Releasing	1 h 26 min
Self Reliance	January 12, 2024	Comedy thriller	Neon	1 h 25 min
The Greatest Hits	April 12, 2024	Romance	Searchlight Pictures	1 h 35 min

== Upcoming original films ==
=== Feature films ===
Title	Release date	Genre	Runtime	Notes
Painter	2026	Action	TBA	
Romy and Michele 2	2027	Comedy	TBA	

=== Documentaries ===
Title	Release date	Runtime	Notes
Fair Play: The Jordan Chiles Story	2027	TBA	
Breaking Spencer Matthews	TBA	TBA	
Untitled Duffy documentary	TBA	TBA	
