= Framing John DeLorean =

2019 documentary

- Theatrical release poster
- Directed by: Don Argott; Sheena M. Joyce
- Screenplay by: Dan Greeney; Alexandra Orton
- Story by: Tamir Ardon; Don Argott; Sheena M. Joyce
- Produced by: Tamir Ardon; Nick Spicer; Don Argott; Sheena M. Joyce
- Starring: Alec Baldwin; Morena Baccarin; Josh Charles; Dean Winters; Michael Rispoli; Jason Jones
- Cinematography: Matthew Santo
- Edited by: Demian Fenton
- Music by: Brooke Blair; Will Blair
- Production companies: XYZ Films; 9.14 Pictures
- Distributed by: Sundance Selects
- Release dates: April 30, 2019 (Tribeca); June 7, 2019 (United States)
- Running time: 109 minutes
- Country: United States
- Language: English
- Box office: $145,626

Framing John DeLorean is a 2019 American documentary film directed by Don Argott and Sheena M. Joyce and written by Dan Greeney and Alexandra Orton, about the life of John DeLorean. The film stars Alec Baldwin, Morena Baccarin, Josh Charles, Dean Winters, Michael Rispoli and Jason Jones. The film was released on June 7, 2019, by Sundance Selects.

While the film is structured as a documentary with a number of involved people as interview subjects, the film also features reenactments of certain important scenes of DeLorean's story. It also features behind the scenes footage of the participants of the reenactment scenes with the cast and crew, who provide their views on DeLorean out-of-character.

== Cast ==
- Alec Baldwin as John DeLorean
- Morena Baccarin as Cristina Ferrare
- Josh Charles as Bill Collins
- Dean Winters as John Valestra
- Michael Rispoli as Jim Hoffman
- Jason Jones as Jerry West
- Dana Ashbrook as Ben Tisa
- Josh Cooke as Howard Weitzman
- Sean Cullen as Roy
- William Hill as GM executive
- Eli Tokash as Zach DeLorean
- Kayla Foster as Colleen
- Grayson Eddey as Zach DeLorean
- Porter Kelly as Court clerk

Interviews for the documentary segments include Baldwin and Baccarin, as well as Bill Collins, Zach DeLorean, and Bob Gale.

== Release ==
The film premiered at the Tribeca Film Festival on April 30, 2019. It was released on June 7, 2019, by Sundance Selects, and was given a limited release in the UK on July 19 through Universal Studios.

=== Home media ===
Shout! Factory released the film in the United States and Canada on DVD and Blu-ray on October 1, 2019. It was released in the United Kingdom on digital download SD and HD on July 28, 2019.

== Reception ==
=== Box office ===
Framing John DeLorean has grossed $145,626 in the United States and Canada, for a total worldwide gross of $145,626 against an unknown production budget.

=== Critical response ===
On review aggregator Rotten Tomatoes, the film holds an approval rating of 90% based on 51 reviews, with an average rating of 7.2/10. The website's critical consensus reads, "Stranger than fiction and just as engrossing, Framing John DeLorean tells its incredible true story in appropriately freewheeling fashion." On Metacritic, the film has a score of 67 out of 100, based on 17 critics, indicating "generally favorable" reviews.

Owen Gleiberman of Variety wrote: "An absorbing documentary, with Alec Baldwin popping up in dramatic re-enactments, adds new insight to the inspiring and scandalous saga of John DeLorean, the auto magnate who got too high on his dream." Glenn Kenny for The New York Times wrote "Framing John DeLorean tells a quintessentially American story of ambition and greed, with plot twists a fiction writer might consider outlandish." Allan Hunter, writing for Screen International, said, "The film is hugely impressive. DeLorean is a persuasive advocate of his own greatness, the hero of his own narrative". Adding "Baldwin provides a running commentary on DeLorean’s nature and motivations, while we witness Baldwin being fitted with prosthetics and the jet black caterpillar eyebrows that were a DeLorean feature. All very meta but perhaps not entirely essential."

In contrast, Rafer Guzman of Newsday called it "an uneven blend of fact and fiction", noting that "scenes are really just elaborate re-enactments that distract us and stop the flow of information. Even less welcome are several “meta” moments in which Baldwin pontificates about the man he's playing"
