= Milkboy =

Recording studio and venue in Philadelphia

Coordinates: 39.95906°N 75.14976°W

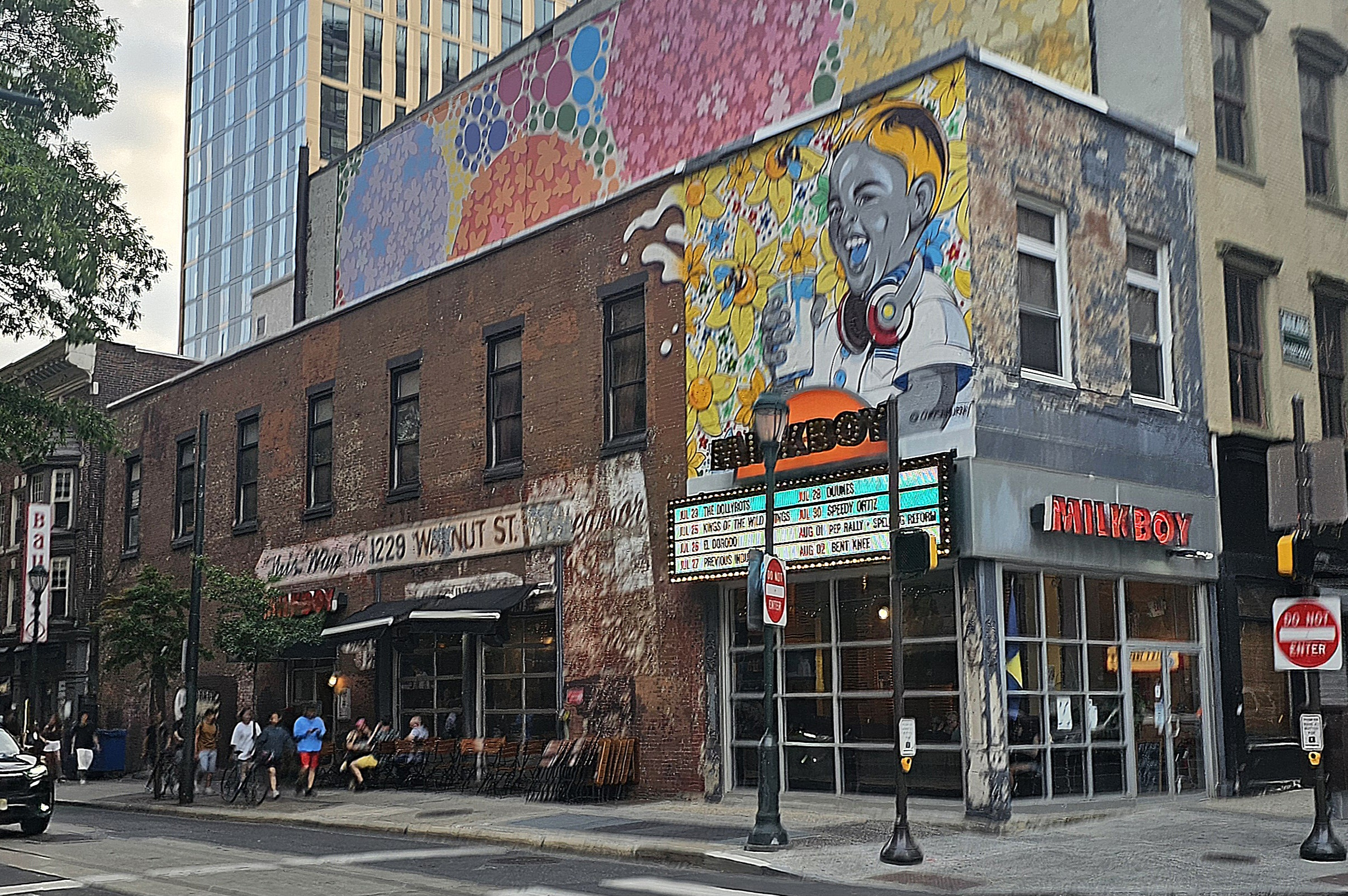
Milkboy in Center City, Philadelphia, 2024

MilkBoy is an American recording studio and entertainment company founded in 1994 by Tommy Joyner. Company headquarters is located at MilkBoy the Studio, at 413 North 7th Street in Philadelphia, Pennsylvania. The original "MilkBoy Recording" was located in north Philadelphia at 5th and Olney above Zapf's music.

MilkBoy hosts three open mic competitions each year. The event kicks off at their south street location on Monday nights where ten finalists are chosen to move on to a live Competition at the Chestnut St. Location. The winner of this final event receives a recording contract at the studio on callowhill.

== 2002 ==
In 2002 after partnering with composer Jamie Lokoff in 1999 Joyner moved to the Philadelphia "main line" area and opened the second studio at 44 West Lancaster Avenue in Ardmore, Pennsylvania.

== 2006 ==
In 2006, MilkBoy opened its first food and beverage operation, a coffee shop and acoustic music venue on Cricket Avenue in Ardmore, right around the corner from the recording studio. A few years later they opened another MilkBoy Coffee in Bryn Mawr, Pennsylvania, which changed ownership in 2012.

== 2010 ==
In 2010, partners Lokoff and Joyner formed the production company BBCG Films, LLC with co-producers Tammy Tiehel-Stedman and Brian O'Connor to produce the movie "Slow Learners," a romantic comedy starring Adam Pally and Sarah Burns. The movie was released by IFC Films' Sundance Selects on August 19, 2015.

== 2011 ==
In late 2011, MilkBoy Coffee obtained a liquor license and changed locations to Center City, Philadelphia. The newly named "MilkBoy" ("Coffee" was dropped from the business) a bar, restaurant, and live music venue, opened at 1100 Chestnut Street in Center City Philadelphia.

== 2012 ==
In January 2012, Joyner and Lokoff left the Ardmore studio, bought what had previously been "The Studio," at 413 North 7th, and rebranded as MilkBoy the Studio, taking over operations from the previous owner producer/arranger Larry Gold. In his 2013 profile for Philadelphia Weekly, Kyle Cassidy touts the enterprising MilkBoy group as a Philly institution in entertainment and hospitality, writing "what’s most defined their success, especially over the last year, is their willingness to diversify and seek business outside of the obvious realm of straightforward music production."

== 2017 ==
In 2017, the MilkBoy brand expanded to College Park, Maryland opening MilkBoy ArtHouse in partnership with the University of Maryland, College Park. MilkBoy decided to end their partnership with UMD at the end of 2019.

== Notable Artists ==
Artists who have had projects produced at MilkBoy Recording, in Ardmore, and MilkBoy the Studio, in Philadelphia include:

- Bruno Mars
- Silk Sonic
- Jazmine Sullivan
- Meek Mill
- Ariana Grande
- Miley Cyrus
- Florence + the Machine
- Gomez
- Dave Matthews
- Trey Songz
- James Taylor
- Ashanti
- The Dixie Hummingbirds
- Marsha Ambrosius
- Lil Uzi Vert
- Saleka
