= Marc Tyler Nobleman =

American writer

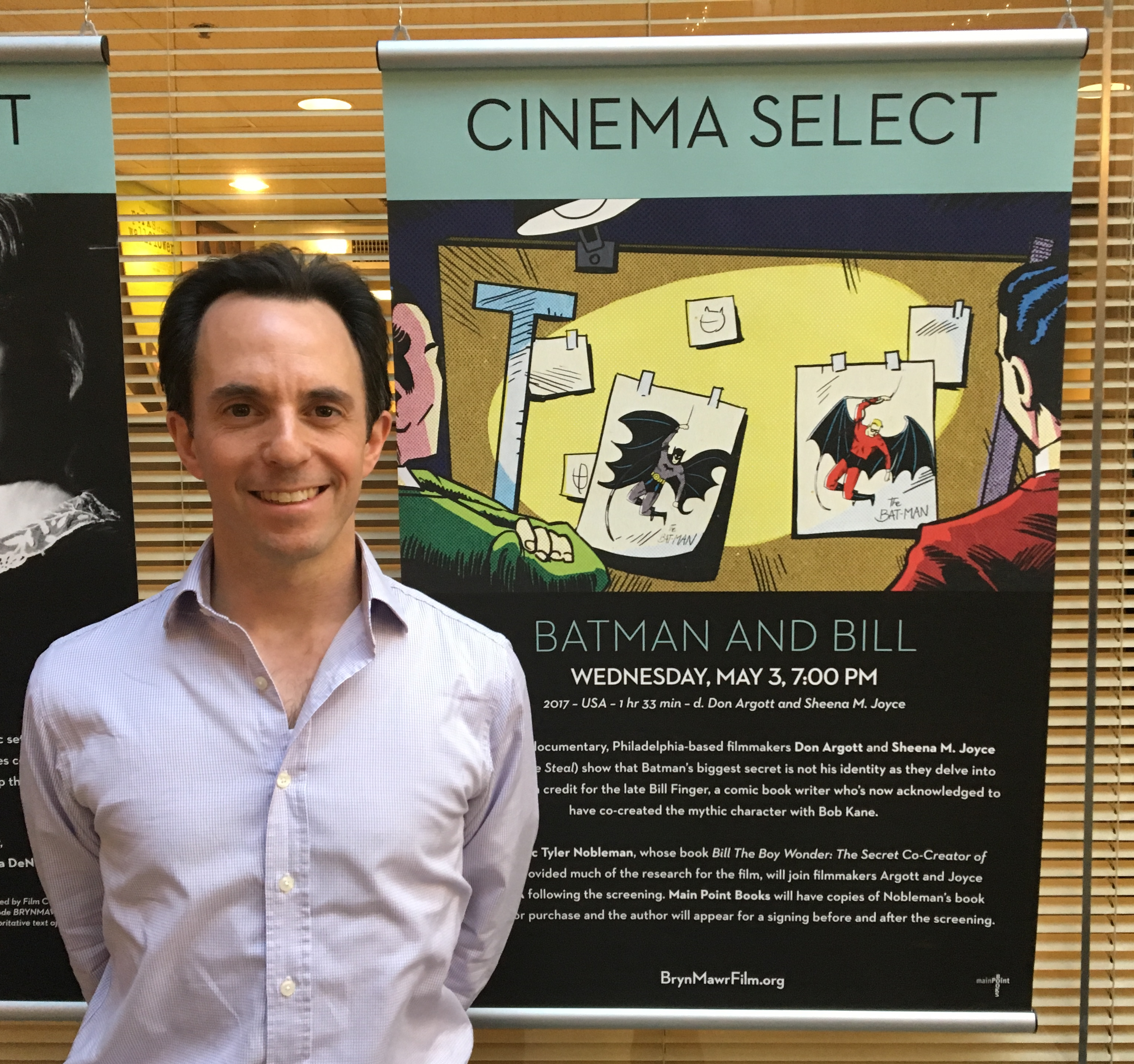
- Nobleman at the Bryn Mawr Film Institute in Pennsylvania, 2017
- Born: March 14, 1972 (age 54); Hartford, Connecticut, US
- Education: Brandeis University
- Occupations: Author, speaker
- Children: 2
- Writing career
- Years active: 1996-present
- Website: www.noblemania.com

Marc Tyler Nobleman (born March 14, 1972) is an American author and speaker. His book Bill the Boy Wonder: The Secret Co-Creator of Batman is the first published biography of Bill Finger, the initially anonymous co-creator and original writer of Batman. It is the basis of the Hulu documentary Batman & Bill, which chronicles Nobleman's nine-year campaign to get Finger's name added to the official Batman credit line. (Note: Attributed to multiple references:)

== Personal life ==
Nobleman is Jewish. He spent his early childhood in Avon, Connecticut, then moved to Cheshire, Connecticut. His first published writing was a Mother's Day poem in The Cheshire Herald when he was nine. In high school, he was a member of the B'nai B'rith Youth Organization (BBYO) and held two regional board positions. He graduated from Cheshire High School and Brandeis University.

== Career ==
Nobleman is the author of numerous nonfiction and fiction books for young readers. His publishers include Penguin Random House, Scholastic, and Houghton Mifflin Harcourt. His first title, The Felix Activity Book, based on characters created in Germany by author Annette Langen and illustrator Constanza Droop, was published in 1996.

Nobleman's other writing credits include humor articles for Nickelodeon Magazine, an episode of the TV show Daniel Tiger’s Neighborhood, and a reference book for adults (What's the Difference?: How to Tell Things Apart That Are Confusingly Close).

He has spoken worldwide at schools, conferences, and other venues including the U.S. State Department, the Queen Mary 2 cruise ship, and the 92nd Street Y. He has given a TED Talk and a Google Talk.

Nobleman created, wrote, directed, and produced Songbook, a part-scripted, part-reality children's web series, in partnership with the Kennedy Center for the Performing Arts, Kwame Alexander, and Mary Rand Hess.

He is also a cartoonist whose single-panel gag cartoons have appeared in publications including The Wall Street Journal, Harvard Business Review, Forbes, Good Housekeeping, Punch, and the Chicken Soup for the Soul book series.

== Effort for Batman co-creator Bill Finger ==
In 2006, Nobleman began researching for a nonfiction picture book about Bill Finger's role in the creation of Batman, who debuted in 1939. Finger was also the original writer of characters including Robin, the Joker, and Catwoman; he named Gotham City and nicknamed Batman “the Dark Knight.” DC Comics did not include Finger's name in the Batman credit line during Finger's lifetime; the character was attributed solely to cartoonist Bob Kane. In 1974, Finger died with little money and almost no public acknowledgement.

Finger had one known child, Fred, who died in 1992. Nobleman's extensive source material did not mention any living Finger heirs. In 2007, Nobleman discovered that, to the contrary, Fred had a daughter, and therefore Finger had a granddaughter, named Athena, born two years after Finger died. Nobleman contacted her via her MySpace page and encouraged her to contact DC Comics to discuss credit for her grandfather. At first she hesitated, then changed her mind.

In 2008, at which time Nobleman had not yet found a publisher for his Finger manuscript, he started advocating for Finger's name to be added to the Batman credit line. This effort began on Nobleman's blog (eventually surpassing 300 posts on Finger) and social media. It later expanded to podcasts including Kevin Smith’s Fatman on Batman, speaking engagements, and other live events including the Paley Center for Media panel in celebration of Batman’s 75th anniversary.

After the manuscript received 34 rejections, Charlesbridge published Bill the Boy Wonder: The Secret Co-Creator of Batman (illustrated by Ty Templeton) in 2012.

Nobleman rallied the public to lobby for a Google Doodle to commemorate Finger’s 100th birthday in 2014. Though a substantial number of comic book fans, celebrities, and media heeded the call, the campaign was ultimately unsuccessful.

In 2015, after negotiating with Athena, DC Entertainment announced that the company would begin crediting Finger alongside Kane in movies including Batman v Superman: Dawn of Justice and TV shows including Gotham. The updated credit also appears in Batman-related comic books, graphic novels, and other print publications. It reads “Batman created by Bob Kane with Bill Finger.” Prior to this, DC had added creator names to characters who were originally uncredited. This was the first time DC amended an existing credit.

In 2017, Hulu released Batman & Bill, a documentary based on Bill the Boy Wonder. With no known footage of Finger in existence, the film tells Finger's story via Nobleman's research and efforts to preserve Finger's legacy. It is the first documentary based on a nonfiction picture book and Hulu's first original documentary. The film has also aired in countries including Spain, France, Australia, and New Zealand. It has been called “Citizen Kane with a twist” and “probably the most important comic book movie ever made.”

Later that year, as a result of a proposal Nobleman submitted to the office of Ritchie Torres, then a New York City Council member, the Bronx renamed a portion of East 192nd Street “Bill Finger Way.” Though New York City was the birthplace and for decades the center of American superhero comic book publishing, this was the first time New York honored a superhero creator with a street renaming. Nobleman spoke at the sign unveiling ceremony, which drew supporters from as far as Utah.

== Selected books ==
- Boys of Steel: The Creators of Superman (2008), illustrated by Ross MacDonald
- Bill the Boy Wonder: The Secret Co-Creator of Batman (2012), illustrated by Ty Templeton
- Brave Like My Brother (2016)
- The Chupacabra Ate the Candelabra (2017), illustrated by Ana Aranda
- Fairy Spell: How Two Girls Convinced the World That Fairies Are Real (2018), illustrated by Eliza Wheeler
- Thirty Minutes Over Oregon: A Japanese Pilot’s World War II Story (2018), illustrated by Melissa Iwai

== Selected honors ==
- American Library Association Notable—Boys of Steel: The Creators of Superman (2008)
- Orbis Pictus Honor—Thirty Minutes Over Oregon: A Japanese Pilot’s World War II Story (2019)
- Catholic Library Association St. Katharine Drexel Award (2025)
