= Rock School (film) =

- Official movie poster
- Directed by: Don Argott
- Produced by: Don Argott; Sheena M. Joyce
- Starring: Paul Green
- Edited by: Demian Fenton
- Production company: Icon Productions
- Distributed by: Newmarket Films; Picturehouse
- Release date: June 3, 2005
- Running time: 93 minutes
- Country: United States
- Language: English

Rock School is a 2005 documentary film about The Paul Green School of Rock Music.

== History ==
Philadelphia based filmmaker Don Argott noticed colorful posters advertising concerts by the Paul Green School of Rock Music around the Philadelphia area, and contacted Green. He and his producing partner Sheena M. Joyce attended a concert featuring the music of Frank Zappa. Shortly after the concert began, Argott heard C.J. Tywoniak playing a guitar part that he "didn't think could be played" and decided he had to make a documentary.

They began shooting their documentary in January 2003, using money that DreamWorks had paid Argott for his musical contributions to the Will Ferrell comedy Old School. In the "fourth or fifth month" of the nine month shooting schedule, Argott and Joyce first heard of the Paramount film with Jack Black, a narrative film featuring a lead character who bore a strong resemblance to Green. One third of the $600,000 budget for the film was spent on music rights.

== Synopsis ==
The film opens with the a title card and the sound of Carlos Santana's guitar solo from the song "Black Magic Woman". Paul Green, the primary subject of the film introduces the evening's concert. The camera pans to reveals that the guitarist is twelve-year-old C.J. Tywoniak. The School is then introduced, with Green re-enacting a scene from the film The Silence of the Lambs as Jame Gumb for a group of students. This is followed by the first of a number of interview segments with Green throughout the film. He explains why he started a performance-based program. 9 year old twin boys Asa and Tucker Collins are interviewed, followed by an interview with Tywoniak and his parents about his future in music, teenage girl Madi Diaz-Svalgard, a Quaker singer/songwriter who frequently clashes with Green and finally Will O'Conner a less-successful student who credits the School with saving his life. These students are followed closely through the rest of the film.

Green talks about various students and then introduces the All-Star program, which is concentrating on the music of Frank Zappa, and including concert footage of the students playing a Zappa song. He then leads the camera on a tour of the School, dropping in on various classroom lessons including Asa trying to learn Black Sabbath's "The Wizard". The film moves to the Collins' home and introduces the twins' mother Andrea Collins, followed by O'Conner at home with his mother Lisa.

There is a montage of scenes of the students rehearsing for a beginner's Black Sabbath show, and an 80's show by the intermediate students, and interviews with other students including Eric and Julie Slick, and keyboard teacher Eric Svalgard, father of Madi Diaz. Green confesses that, if the school is successful, the students will become better musicians than himself, followed by his personal history and introduces his wife Lisa.

A clip of Zappa musician Napoleon Murphy Brock is played for the students, and Green talks about getting the students to play Zappa's notoriously difficult music. The All-Stars have been invited to play the annual Zappa music festival Zappanale. Green and various students are interviewed about the upcoming event.

Diaz is interviewed about a side project with her Quaker friends, the Friendly Gangstaz who rap traditional Quaker hymns, which Green mocks. Tywoniak's parents discuss their son's focus and drive. Andrea applies make-up to her son Tucker and dresses Asa's hair into the Mohawk hairstyle seen on the film poster in preparation for the twins' Black Sabbath show while singing the song "Sweet Leaf". Several Black Sabbath songs are performed at the concert including "Sweet Leaf", "Paranoid" and "Iron Man". Green delivers a ranting, profanity-laden halftime speech during the intermission of the show. On the commentary track, the directors reveal that the MPAA informed them that the film was rated R, and had 38 usages of the word "fuck". The location switches to Green's home and a scene with his infant son Walden, who dances enthusiastically to a Zappa song.

A title card reveals that Tywoniak had to undergo emergency orthopedic surgery two days before a concert. Green introduces him at the concert, revealing that Tywoniak would not undergo the operation unless he could play the concert. Back at the school, Green tells the students that Melissa Dribben, a reporter from the Philadelphia Inquirer newspaper, is to do a feature story on the school. The article is critical of Green and his methods and O'Conner says that it "was written with the composition of a fourth grader". Dribben had called O'Conner "the sad Eeyore of Rock School", and revealed a Green joke about the "Will O'Conner Award for the Student Most Likely To Kill Himself". This caused considerable friction at O'Conner's home, resulting in him leaving the school.

There is another montage of rehearsals for the 80s tribute show which was not going well, a situation exacerbated by a broken air conditioner on a very hot day. Diaz and Green are interviewed about their relationship, Green stating that he believes she is "an extraordinary talent". Green is interviewed in his car in a calmer, more reflective mood, revealing that he created Rock School so that he "had something that he could be the best at".

Tywoniak is shown at the Guitar Gods show playing Eddie Van Halen's cover of the Kinks song "You Really Got Me", followed by more interview footage of Green in the backyard of his home and O'Conner after he had left the school. Another montage of the fraught 80s show rehearsals with Green ranting and slamming doors, screaming "Don't fucking make mistakes! Not on 'Rebel Yell'!" Green is interviewed about his relationship with the students, and motivation. O'Conner is interviewed at an art space screen-printing T-shirts, reflecting on his time at the school.

The All-Stars are shown rehearsing Zappa songs for their trip to Germany and the Zappanale festival, aboard the flight, arriving at the Berlin airport and traveling to Bad Doberan. Green gives a long pep talk about the upcoming concert at the youth hostel at which the kids are staying, followed by a trip to the festival. The next day, Green wakes the kids, followed by interviews with each of the All-Stars about the upcoming show, performing technically difficult music before an audience very familiar with that music.

The All-Stars rehearse "Inca Roads" with Napoleon Murphy Brock, who is interviewed about his experience, recalling being incredulous when first informed of the school and the material the students were playing. Green gives a last-minute set of performance notes before they take the stage. They perform Zappa's "Zomby Woof", followed by an original solo by Tywoniak, intercut with shots of audience members with incredulous looks on their faces. Brock then takes the stage, dropping to his knees, genuflecting to Tywoniak before going to the front of the stage and leading the audience in a mass genuflection before leading the band on "Inca Roads".

As the All-Stars leave the stage, they are greeted by a collection of other festival performers including Jimmy Carl Black of the Mothers of Invention who thanks Green for his work and describes the All-Stars as "phenomenal". The All-Stars are jamming with other festival performers in final concert scene, and Green hugs his performers.

The end of the film features interviews with O'Conner, Tywoniak, Diaz, Green and the Tucker twins trying to sum up their Rock School experience. The credit sequence features the students playing "School's Out" with Alice Cooper at the film's premiere at the Sundance Film Festival, intercut with additional scenes of Green and the students of the school.

== Reception ==
The film had a successful run on the festival circuit, screenings often followed by concerts by the students of the school. A showing at Seattle's Egyptian theater was followed by a concert featuring Ann Wilson and Eddie Vedder, and a sold-out screening at the Experience Music Project. It did not do as well in regular theatrical distribution, possibly due to consumer confusion with the similarly named Jack Black film. It was withdrawn from distribution after a single weekend.

Manohla Dargis, writing for The New York Times, notes that "Mr. Green's pedagogic style appears predicated on the idea that if you spare the insults, derision and eardrum-piercing assaults, you spoil the child" while Roger Ebert points out that "What is important is that he doesn't talk down to the students, and he is deadly serious about wanting them to work hard, practice more, and become good musicians. He rants and raves, but at least he doesn't condescend."

Michael O'Sullivan of The Washington Post called the film "fascinating and funny" and an "entertaining portrait of a volatile but effective educator". Philadelphia Weekly called it an "utterly charming crowd pleaser", described the direction as "inspired" and said the film "makes Jack Black's turn in School of Rock look as punk as Mr. Belvedere".

NPR rock critic Ken Tucker said, "I'd hand out DVDs of Rock School to everyone in the country with a teaching degree, and dare them to match this level of commitment."

== Soundtrack ==
The soundtrack for the film was released May 31, 2005 featuring the students of the School performing with Gregg Rolie of Santana, Alice Cooper, Deep Purple's Ian Gillan, Yes' Jon Anderson, The Police's Stewart Copeland, The Ramones' Marky Ramone, Heart's Ann Wilson, Megadeth's Dave Mustaine, and Billy Idol.

1. "Black Magic Woman" – Gregg Rolie
2. "I Wanna Be Sedated" – Marky Ramone, Tyson Ritter of the All-American Rejects
3. "School's Out" – Alice Cooper
4. "Barracuda" – Ann Wilson
5. "Highway Star" – Ian Gillan
6. "L.A. Woman" – The Paul Green School of Rock Music
7. "Heart Of The Sunrise" – Jon Anderson
8. "Rebel Yell" – Billy Idol
9. "Don't Stand So Close to Me" – Stewart Copeland
10. "Iron Man" – The Paul Green School of Rock Music
11. "Peace Sells" – Dave Mustaine
12. "Hocus Pocus" – The Paul Green School of Rock Music

== See also ==
- List of documentaries
