= Track of the Moon Beast =

1976 horror film

- Theatrical release poster
- Directed by: Richard Ashe
- Written by: Bill Finger; Charles Sinclair
- Produced by: Ralph T. Desiderio
- Starring: Chase Cordell; Leigh Drake; Gregorio Sala
- Cinematography: R. Kent Evans
- Music by: Robert G. Orpin
- Production company: Lizard Productions Inc.
- Release date: June 1, 1976 (US)
- Running time: 81 minutes
- Country: United States
- Language: English
- Budget: $300,000

Track of the Moon Beast is a 1976 horror film directed by Richard Ashe and written by Bill Finger and Charles Sinclair. It tells the story of a mineralogist who is hit in the head by a meteorite, which subsequently turns him in to a vicious, reptilian creature during a full moon. The film was shot during the month of July 1972 on a $300,000 budget. It was set and filmed in Albuquerque, New Mexico and featured locals as extras. Its production company kept the film under wraps during filming.

Planned for a 1973 release in theaters, it ended up airing on television in 1976. Retrospective reviews for the film have been negative. Track of the Moon Beast was featured in a tenth season episode of the comedy television series Mystery Science Theater 3000 in 1999.

== Plot ==
Track of the Moon Beast

The film takes place in Albuquerque, New Mexico, where mineralogist Paul Carlson (Chase Cordell) is struck by a lunar meteorite while observing a meteor shower. Lodged in his brain, a fragment from the meteorite causes him to transform into a strong and vicious lizard (the titular "Moon Beast") whenever the Moon comes out. His large, pet lizard vanishes, the implication that somehow the pet's DNA serves as a template for Paul's transformed self. In his lizard form, Paul loses all trace of his human self and goes about killing people at random. While human, Paul is subject to spells of dizziness and nausea, causing his girlfriend Kathy Nolan (Donna Leigh Drake) and friend and former anthropology professor Johnny "Longbow" Salinas (Gregorio Sala) to become concerned.

Eventually it is shown that Paul is actually the Moon Beast; later, it is deduced that the meteorite fragment in his brain is the cause of his transformation. Plans are made to remove it from his skull, but the NASA brain surgeons realize—after another X-ray and Johnny's recollection of some Native American legends documenting similar phenomena—that the meteorite fragment has disintegrated and will eventually cause Paul to self-combust. When Paul learns of this, he escapes into the desert on a stolen motorcycle, presumably to kill himself so that he will not cause any more harm. When Johnny recalls that Paul's favorite place was always Sandia Crest, Kathy, Johnny, and local law enforcement officers follow him there. Johnny eventually shoots him with an arrow tipped with the original meteorite, which causes him to explode.

== Cast ==
- Chase Cordell as Paul G. Carlson
- Leigh Drake as Kathy Nolan (credited as Donna Leigh Drake)
- Gregorio Sala as Prof. Johnny "Longbow" Salinas
- Patrick Wright as Police Captain McCabe
- Francine Kessler as Janet Price
- Timothy Wayne Brown as Dr. Sutton
- Crawford MacCallum as Dr. Lawrence
- Jeanne Swain as Caroline Harris
- Alan Swain as Sid Harris
- Fred McCaffrey as Dr. Rizzo
- Tim Butler as Budd Keeler
- Gary Kanin as Newscaster
- Frank Larrabee as Lead Singer
- Joe Blasco as the Moon Beast

== Production ==
Track of the Moon Beast was directed by Richard Ashe, produced by Ralph T. Desiderio and written by Bill Finger and Charles Sinclair. Its setting and location was in Albuquerque, New Mexico as Finger had written the story in the city despite never visiting, instead basing it on brochures. Frank Larrabee and his band, who were staying at the same Ramada Inn as the movie crew, performed the song "California Lady" in the movie. The performance was shot at the hotel.

The budget for the film was $300,000. It was produced by Lizard Productions and received help from New Mexico's chamber of commerce. The production company kept the film under wraps during filming. Local Albuquerqueans were used for small speaking parts or as extras. Filming was from July 3 to the 27th of 1972, finishing two days ahead of schedule. The film was expected to be released in the spring of 1973. It ended up being shown on television in 1976.

== Release ==
Track of the Moon Beast was copyrighted in 1972 with the expectation that it would be released theatrically. It was never picked up by a distributor, however, and finally premiered on television on June 1, 1976. It was released on VHS by Prism Entertainment, DVD in 2001 by American Home Treasures, along with Creature and Snowbeast, in the set Classic Creature Movies II. It has since been packaged with other public domain movies in several DVD releases, including Chilling Classics (Mill Creek Entertainment, 2005), 50 Fright Classics (Emson, 2006), and Drive-In Classics (St. Clair Entertainment Group, 2007).

== Reception and legacy ==
Critical response has been predominantly negative. John Kenneth Muir considered the film to be "a failure in every way," criticizing its special effects, acting, and story. Muir did note that despite its numerous negative aspects, the movie had a quirky charm to it, similar to that of other low-budget 1970s films such as The Crater Lake Monster and The Giant Spider Invasion. TV Guide panned the film, saying, "Although this premise is ripe with comedic opportunities, the production is hampered by classically inept film-making, and the story unfolds so slowly one begins to think the film is running in reverse. The acting is even worse. Still, horror fanatics might find some interest in Joe Blasko's lizard makeup." Oh the Horror! gave it a negative review, panning the film's execution, dialogue, and script, and deeming the movie "embarrassing" and its ending "ridiculous." It would later be on IMDb's "Bottom 100" list, at one point in the 53rd slot.

=== Mystery Science Theater 3000 ===
The film is featured in a tenth season episode (#1007) of Mystery Science Theater 3000. In 2017, Track of the Moon Beast was included in the Volume 38 DVD set, alongside Invasion USA, Colossus and the Headhunters, and High School Big Shot.

== See also ==
- Redsploitation
- List of films in the public domain
- Stew
