= Slow Learners =

- Film poster
- Directed by: Don Argott; Sheena M. Joyce
- Screenplay by: Heather Maidat, as Matt Serword
- Produced by: Tammy Tiehel-Stedman; Tommy Joyner; Jamie Lokoff; Brian O'Connor
- Starring: Adam Pally; Sarah Burns; Reid Scott; Catherine Reitman; Kate Flannery; Marceline Hugot; Kevin Dunn
- Cinematography: Chase Bowman
- Edited by: Demian Fenton
- Music by: The Wellspring
- Production companies: BBCG Films; 9.14 Pictures; Milkboy Entertainment
- Distributed by: Sundance Selects
- Release dates: April 20, 2015 (Tribeca Film Festival); August 19, 2015
- Country: United States
- Language: English

Slow Learners is a 2015 American romantic comedy film directed by Don Argott and Sheena M. Joyce and starring Adam Pally, Sarah Burns, Reid Scott, Catherine Reitman, and Kevin Dunn. An indie, romantic comedy film, it follows two friends who embark on a journey of self-discovery when they decide to help each other become "bad" and "crazy."

== Cast ==
- Adam Pally as Jeff Lowry
- Sarah Burns as Anne Martin
- Reid Scott as Max
- Catherine Reitman as Julia
- Mary Grill as Beth
- Kate Flannery as Principal Miller
- Kevin Dunn as Darren Lowry
- Marceline Hugot as Joyce Lowry
- Frances Callier as Robin
- Ursula Parker as Little Miss Trooper
- Angela Shelton as Michelle
- Gil Ozeri as Dan
- Cecily Strong as The Ex
- Bobby Moynihan as Lenny
- Peter Grosz as Dr. Mark Sonderskov

== Production ==
In October 2011, producer Brian O'Connor provided the seed money for the movie to get started while O'Connor and the other producers spent 2012 trying to acquire the funding necessary to begin filming.

=== Casting ===
On April 16, 2014, Adam Pally was cast in the lead role.

=== Filming ===
Principal photography began in May 2014 and was conducted in and around Media, Philadelphia.

Filming ended on May 28, 2014, after a month-long shoot.

== Release ==
Tammy Tiehel-Stedman said of producers: "they will have the task to shop the film to festivals and look for distribution opportunities. It will take nearly 18 months in post production before general audiences have their chance to laugh" thus suggesting theatrical release of Bad Boys Crazy Girls in late 2015.

== Critical reception ==
- https://www.nytimes.com/2015/08/19/movies/review-in-slow-learners-aspirational-hedonists-doff-their-glasses.html
- https://www.hollywoodreporter.com/movies/movie-reviews/slow-learners-tribeca-review-790967/
- https://www.latimes.com/entertainment/movies/la-et-mn-slow-learners-review-20150904-story.html
