= Taylor Swift: The End of an Era =

- Official poster
- Genre: Documentary
- Created by: Taylor Swift
- Directed by: Don Argott; Sheena M. Joyce
- Creative directors: Taylor Swift; Stu Dingley; Moath Hattab; Parker Genoway; Melissa Garcia; Dan Norman; Nolan Padilla
- Starring: Taylor Swift
- Narrated by: Taylor Swift
- Composer: West Dylan Thordson
- Country of origin: United States
- Original language: English
- No. of seasons: 1
- No. of episodes: 6

Production
- Executive producers: Rob Booth; Dom Thomas
- Cinematography: Jarred Alterman
- Editors: Judah-Lev Dickstein; Demian Fenton; Arielle Shermon; Alyse Ardell Spiegel
- Running time: 42–49 minutes
- Production companies: Object & Animal

Original release
- Network: Disney+
- Release: December 12 – December 23, 2025

Related
- Taylor Swift: The Eras Tour: The Final Show

Taylor Swift: The End of an Era (stylized as Taylor Swift | The End of an Era) is a 2025 American documentary miniseries about the singer-songwriter Taylor Swift's sixth concert tour, The Eras Tour (2023–2024), directed by filmmakers Don Argott and Sheena M. Joyce. The series consists of six episodes that follow the lives of Swift and her crew during the tour. The show began streaming on Disney+ on December 12, 2025.

In the series, Swift and crew discuss the creative development, logistics, cultural impact and personal sentiments of the Eras Tour, which became Swift's most profitable tour and the highest-grossing tour of all time. It features interviews and archive footage of her family, backup dancers, band, and other personnel, as well as her friends and guest performers, such as Ed Sheeran, Florence Welch, Sabrina Carpenter and Gracie Abrams.

The End of an Era is a follow-up to Swift's 2023 concert film, Taylor Swift: The Eras Tour, which documented the Los Angeles shows of the tour. The first two episodes of the series premiered alongside a second concert film, subtitled The Final Show, which captures the tour's last show in Vancouver. The remaining episodes were released on December 19 and 23. The series received praise from critics for its narration, depicting of the inner workings, emotional topics, and Swift's comportment.

== Premise ==
The series is a look at the conception, behind-the-scenes and the final moments of the Eras Tour, the sixth concert tour by Taylor Swift and the highest-grossing concert tour of all time. It focuses on the scale, creative development, backstage emotions, and personal challenges of Swift and her touring crew. Composed of behind-the-scenes footage, concert clips, interviews, news, and social media reactions, it captures the emotional highs and lows of the cultural phenomenon and revealing the human side of the massive production.

== Cast ==
- Taylor Swift
- Andrea Swift
- Scott Swift
- Austin Swift
- Travis Kelce
- Ed Sheeran
- Florence Welch
- Sabrina Carpenter
- Gracie Abrams
- Mandy Moore
- Amanda Balen
- Robert Allen
- Matt Billingslea
- Amos Heller
- Paul Sidoti
- David Cook
- Max Bernstein
- Mike Meadows
- Kamilah Marshall
- Melanie Nyema
- Eliotte Nicole
- Jeslyn Gorman
- Jan Ravnik
- Kameron Saunders
- Kim Hamilton
- Audrey Douglass
- Taylor Banks
- Sam McWilliams
- Raphael Thomas
- Karen Chuang
- Tori Evans
- Whyley Yoshimura
- Natalie Peterson
- Eliotte Nicole
- Sydney Moss
- Kevin Scheitzbach
- Tamiya Lewis
- Jason Kelce (archive footage)
- Marjorie Finlay (archive footage)

== Background and release ==
Swift released the concert film, Taylor Swift: The Eras Tour, via cinema theatres on October 13, 2023. It documented the Los Angeles shows of the Eras Tour, filmed from August 3 to 5, 2023, at SoFi Stadium in Inglewood, California. It became the most profitable concert film of all time, and was subsequently released on Disney+. Swift's fans had demanded and suspected an upcoming documentary about the tour, showing the inner workings and technical aspects of the tour. In 2024, fans noticed the prominent presence of filming crew and equipments at the shows of the Eras Tour's last leg, fueling beliefs that a documentary about the tour is in the making. Some fans were also interviewed and reportedly signed non-disclosure agreements.

On October 13, 2025, Swift announced on the daytime television show Good Morning America two more Eras Tour-inspired releases via Disney+ on December 12, a day before her 36th birthday: the six-episode docuseries, Taylor Swift: The End of an Era, and a concert film capturing the tour's final show at Vancouver, Canada, titled The Eras Tour: The Final Show. A trailer of the series was also released, teasing behind-the-scenes, rehearsals, backstage moments, and other clips of Swift's family and friends, including her parents Scott and Andrea, now husband Travis Kelce, and fellow artists Ed Sheeran, Sabrina Carpenter, and Gracie Abrams. A preview special, featuring the first episode of The End of an Era and one hour of The Final Show, aired on ABC on December 12. After the first two episodes premiered on the same date, the next two followed on December 19 and the final two on December 26. On December 9, Swift held an intimate advance screening of the first two episodes for her touring crew, family, and friends, in New York City.

== Episodes ==
No.	Title	Original release date
1	"Welcome to the Eras Tour"	December 12, 2025
Swift gives her band and dancers an emotional pep talk before the final show of the Eras Tour. She and her team delve into the early development and planning of the tour, and its outcomes and cultural impact. Swift grapples with the aftermath of a foiled terror attack in Vienna and a deadly stabbing at a Swift-themed dance class in Liverpool. She and Ed Sheeran practice and perform a surprise medley in London.
2	"Magic in the Eras"	December 12, 2025
Swift and crew integrate The Tortured Poets Department into the Eras Tour, learning the reworked setlist and choreography before the Paris shows. Associate choreographer Amanda Balen and dancer Kameron Saunders discuss overcoming personal struggles. Swift surprises the crew with bonuses, and rehearses with Florence Welch for the performance of "Florida!!!" in London.
3	"Kismet"	December 19, 2025
Swift's mother Andrea recollects her daughter's childhood. Swift and crew take a break after the European leg. Her stylist Joseph Cassell experiments with new costumes, including the new bodysuit for Reputation set of the tour. Backup singer Jeslyn Gorman discusses her breast cancer diagnosis and treatment. Swift recounts her ordeal with the stage management, rigorous workout regimen, and impact of harsh weather. The band, dancers and backup singers appraise their familial bond. They regroup, rehearse, and resume the tour in Miami.
4	"Thank You for the Lovely Bouquet"	December 19, 2025
Swift creates and records The Tortured Poets Department amidst the tour. She talks about meeting her boyfriend Travis Kelce and newfound interest in American football. Kelce joins her on-stage for the "I Can Do It with a Broken Heart" skit. Swift surprises the crowd with a performance with Sabrina Carpenter. Dancer Whyley Yoshimura reflects on his identity after given the opportunity to perform "...Ready for It?". The Eras Tour visits its last US stops, New Orleans and Indianapolis, laden with eager Swifties.
5	"Marjorie"	December 23, 2025
The Eras Tour heads to Toronto, Balen's hometown. Andrea draws parallels between her daughter and late mother. Balen and Swift emphasize the importance of family in pursuing dreams. The crew reflects on personal losses, including backup singer Kamilah Marshall's late mother. Swift performs "Marjorie" and becomes emotional. Gracie Abrams talks looking up to Swift, and they mashup "Us" and "Out of the Woods". Swift creates and records The Life of a Showgirl in Sweden.
6	"Remember This Moment"	December 23, 2025
Emotions culminate at the last stop of the Eras Tour, Vancouver. Swift, family, and crew are struck with joy and sadness, and tell how the tour altered their lives. Swift explains the "22" hat tradition. She rehearses and performs a mashup of "Long Live", "New Year's Day" and "The Manuscript", and takes a bow.

== Reception ==
=== Viewership ===
Streaming analytics firm FlixPatrol, which monitors daily updated VOD charts and streaming ratings across the globe, announced that The End of an Era was the No. 1 series on Disney+ globally as of December 15, 2025. Nielsen Media Research, which records streaming viewership on certain U.S. television screens, reported that it garnered 377 million minutes of watch time from December 22–28, ranking it as the tenth most-streamed original series that week.

=== Critical response ===
Upon release, The End of an Era was met with positive reviews. On the review aggregator website Rotten Tomatoes, 88% of 17 critics' reviews are positive. The website's critical consensus is "This celebratory documentary takes a deeper look at the process, wholesomeness and overall industry behemoth that is Taylor Swift: The Eras Tour; aptly spending time with Swift's steadfast crew and dedicated fans to sweetly bookend The End of an Era". Metacritic, which uses a weighted average, assigned the series a score of 79 out of 100, based on 8 critics.

Various reviews praised the emotional heft. Common Sense Media's Joly Herman called it an excellent series documenting "momentum, vision, perseverance, and professionalism". Amber Fowling of The Globe and Mail called it a moving "must-see" documentary. Angie Han of The Hollywood Reporter described the docuseries' as a "juicy tell-all". She commended the "unguarded, emotional and off the cuff" scenes for making The End of an Era a compelling and endearing watch. Similarly, NME journalist Nick Levine felt it was an emotionally moving and "illuminating" television. TheWrap's Matthew Creith considered it a revealing and hearty watch.

Many reviews highlighted Swift's comportment. According to Rose Gallagher of Stylist, the series is "the most candid access we have ever had to Swift." Johnny Loftus of Decider said the series chronicles Swift's "emotional state" whilst on tour. Laura Snapes of The Guardian complimented Swift as an "endearingly, absolute maniac" due to her persistence and creativeness for the Eras Tour despite the terror incidents that happened during the tour. Neil McCormick, in a five-star review published in The Daily Telegraph, said that the series has the potential to convert sceptics, highlighting Swift's "all-conquering" entertainership. Similarly, Alci Rengifo of Entertainment Voice felt that The End of an Era spotlights the uniqueness of Swift's persona and personality.

Chris Willman of Variety and Mamta Naik of Mashable found the series entertaining and emotionally absorbing, and praised the spotlight on the crew of the Eras Tour—especially the stories of Saunders and Balen. India Block of The Standard praised the episodes' authenticity, stating that they achieved "what Lana Wilson couldn't with the tightly controlled messaging Miss Americana". Sophie Brookover of The A.V. Club praised the crew's "storytelling structural support" and "quotable" interviews. Levine and Creith opined that the series is a tribute to the cultural phenomenon and serves fans who want to relive it.

Few reviews of the first two episodes were lukewarm. Finn McRedmond of New Statesman called it a dull and self-indulgent documentary. The Observer columnist Barbara Ellen dubbed it "bland and perfunctory". Jesse Hassenger of The Daily Beast felt that the series is mostly process-based narrative, sometimes a "little disjointed".

=== Accolades ===
Accolades received by Taylor Swift: The End of an Era
Award	Year	Category	Recipient(s)	Result	Ref.
Astra TV Awards	2026	Best Docuseries or Nonfiction Series	Taylor Swift: The End of an Era	Nominated	
iHeartRadio Music Awards	2026	Favorite On Screen	Taylor Swift	Nominated	

== See also ==
- Folklore: The Long Pond Studio Sessions, a 2020 documentary concert film providing insight into the making of Swift's eighth studio album
- Miss Americana, a 2020 autobiographical documentary film about Swift's life and career
