= Pissgrave =

American death metal band

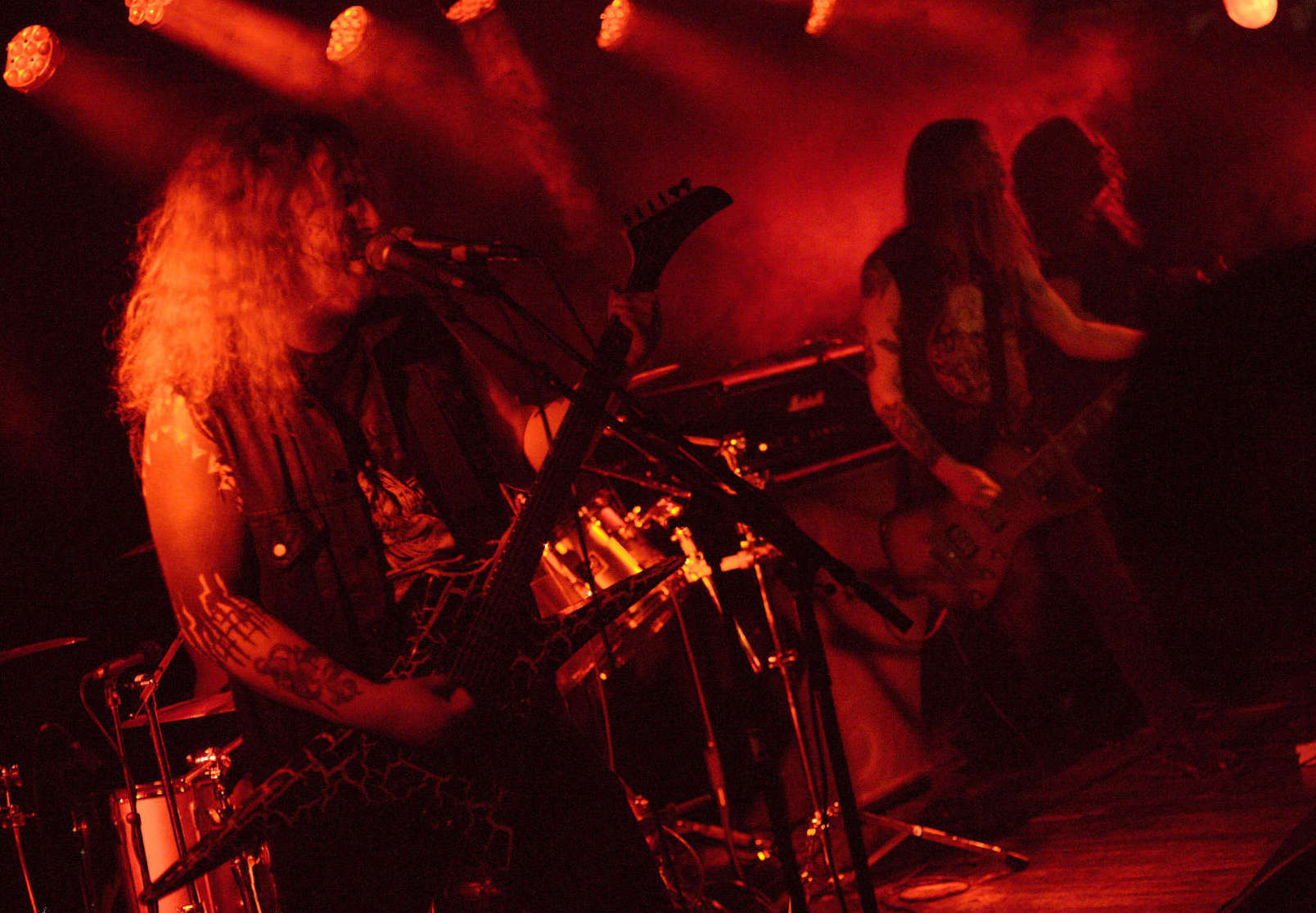
- Pissgrave in 2016

Background information
- Origin: Philadelphia, Pennsylvania, U.S.
- Genres: Death metal, war metal
- Years active: 2013–present
- Labels: Graceless; Profound Lore
- Members: Matt Mellon; Tim Mellon; Demian Fenton; Brad Dumville
- Past members: John Guarracino
- Website: pissgrave.bandcamp.com

Pissgrave is an American death metal band formed in 2013 in Philadelphia, Pennsylvania. The current line-up consists of Tim Mellon (guitar, vocals), Demian Fenton (guitar, vocals), Matt Mellon (drums) and Brad Dumville (bass). The band is known for its "extreme old-school death metal" sound and graphic album covers depicting actual gore.

== History ==
Guitarists Tim Mellon and Demian Fenton, drummer Matt Mellon, and bassist John Guarracino formed Pissgrave in 2013. The band released its self-titled demo tape in 2014 on Graceless Recordings, gaining attention for its "primitive production" and extreme sound. Following its release, the band signed to Profound Lore Records, which issued their 2015 debut album Suicide Euphoria, produced by Arthur Rizk.

After their North American tour, founding bassist John Guarracino left to focus on Hæthen and was replaced with Brad Dumville. The band collaborated with Rizk on its second studio album, 2019's Posthumous Humiliation. Pitchfork and Exclaim! called the record "one of the best death metal albums of 2019." The former included it on its "Best Metal Albums of 2019" list.

== Musical style ==
Pissgrave's sound has been characterized primarily as death metal, with AllMusic's Thom Jurek describing the band as "one of the more outrageous acts to emerge from the barebones ethos of old-school death metal with a war metal production aesthetic." The band's sound has been compared to that of Deicide, Revenge and Cannibal Corpse. The band's cover arts feature graphic violence.

On the band's sound and aesthetic, guitarist Tim Mellon has stated: "The overall aesthetic is reality-based death. Pissgrave are rooted in reality rather than fantasy. Images of violent, offensive death [are] what is necessary to portray us musically and visually."

== Members ==
Current members

- Matt Mellon – drums (2013–present)
- Tim Mellon – guitar, vocals (2013–present)
- Demian Fenton – guitar, vocals (2013–present)
- Brad Dumville – bass (2017–present)

Former members

- John Guarracino – bass (2013–2017)

== Discography ==
Studio albums

- Suicide Euphoria (2015)
- Posthumous Humiliation (2019)
- Malignant Worthlessness (2025)

Demos

- Pissgrave (2014)
