= Travis Wilson (wide receiver) =

American football player (born 1984)

No. 81
- Position: Wide receiver

Personal information
- Born: February 11, 1984 (age 42); Carrollton, Texas, U.S.
- Listed height: 6 ft 1 in (1.85 m)
- Listed weight: 213 lb (97 kg)

Career information
- High school: Creekview (Carrollton, Texas)
- College: Oklahoma
- NFL draft: 2006: 3rd round, 78th overall pick

Career history
- Cleveland Browns (2006–2007); Denver Broncos (2008)*; Dallas Cowboys (2008–2009)*
- * Offseason or practice squad member only

Awards and highlights
- Second-team All-Big 12 (2005)

Career NFL statistics
- Receptions: 2
- Receiving yards: 32
- Stats at Pro Football Reference

Travis Wilson (born February 11, 1984) is an American former professional football player who was a wide receiver in the National Football League (NFL) for the Cleveland Browns, Denver Broncos and Dallas Cowboys. He was selected by the Browns in the third round of the 2006 NFL draft. He played college football for the Oklahoma Sooners.

== Early life ==
Wilson attended Creekview High School. As a junior, he had 27 receptions for 400 yards and 7 touchdowns.

As a senior, he was rated as one of the nation's top 25 receivers, setting school single-season records with 42 catches for 1,098 yards (26.1 avg.) and fourteen touchdowns. He also was a cornerback, making 17 tackles and 4 interceptions. He returned five kickoffs for 166 yards, including an 87-yard kickoff return for a touchdown and a 77-yard punt return for a touchdown.

He also practiced track and basketball.

== College career ==
Wilson accepted a football scholarship from the University of Oklahoma. As a freshman, he played in 8 games, making 5 receptions for 50 yards (10.0-yard avg.) and one touchdown.

As a sophomore, he appeared in 14 games with 2 starts. He had 25 receptions for 295 yards (11.8-yard avg.) and 4 touchdowns.

As a junior, he had a breakout season, playing in 13 games with 8 starts. He registered 50 receptions (thirteenth in school history) for 660 yards (13.2-yard avg.), 11 touchdown receptions (second in school history) and 9 kickoff returns for 135 yards.

As a senior, he suffered a mid-season injury that limited him to 25 receptions for 310 yards (12.4-yard avg.), one touchdown, 2 carries for 61 yards, one rushing touchdown and 9 kickoff returns for 168 yards (18.7-yard avg.).

Despite sharing time with three other future NFL receivers -- Mark Clayton, Mark Bradley, and Brandon Jones, he finished his career as one of the top receivers in school history, with 105 receptions (eighth in school history) for 1,315 yards (thirteenth in school history) and 17 touchdowns (second in school history) in 42 games; he started 17. He returned 18 kicks for 303 yards, and rushed for 77 yards, scoring one touchdown. He was a University Studies major.

== Professional career ==
Pre-draft measurables
Height	Weight	Arm length	Hand span	40-yard dash	10-yard split	20-yard split	20-yard shuttle	Three-cone drill	Vertical jump	Broad jump
6 ft 2 in (1.88 m)	214 lb (97 kg)	31 3/8 in (0.80 m)	9 1/2 in (0.24 m)	4.52 s	1.60 s	2.65 s	3.99 s	6.70 s	36.5 in (0.93 m)	10 ft 0 in (3.05 m)
All values from NFL Combine

=== Cleveland Browns ===
Wilson was selected by the Cleveland Browns in the third round (78th overall) in the 2006 NFL draft. His draft preparation with IMG was chronicled in the film Two Days in April. He made his NFL debut in the third game of the season against the Baltimore Ravens on September 24, 2006. Wilson played in his second NFL game versus the Ravens on December 17, catching one pass for 16 yards. He played his third game against the Tampa Bay Buccaneers on December 24, but did not receive any passes. The next week, Wilson started his first game against the Houston Texans on December 31, catching one more pass for another 16-yard gain. He appeared in 4 games (one start), making 2 receptions for 32 yards (16.0-yard avg.). He was declared inactive in 9 contests and was active but did not play in 3 others.

In 2007, he was declared inactive in all 16 regular season games. He was released on August 31, 2008.

=== Denver Broncos ===
On September 1, 2008, he was signed by the Denver Broncos to the practice squad. He was released on September 23.

=== Dallas Cowboys ===
On October 1, 2008, he was signed to the Dallas Cowboys practice squad after wide receiver Mike Jefferson was suspended four games. After finishing the season on the team's practice squad, he was re-signed to a future contract on December 31. He was subsequently waived injured (knee) on July 28, 2009, and reverted to injured reserve. He was released with an injury settlement on September 3.
