= Batman & Bill =

- Directed by: Don Argott; Sheena M. Joyce
- Based on: Bill the Boy Wonder: The Secret Co-Creator of Batman by Marc Tyler Nobleman
- Produced by: Don Argott; Sheena M. Joyce
- Cinematography: Don Argott
- Edited by: Demian Fenton
- Music by: Brooke Blair; Will Blair
- Production companies: 9.14 Pictures; Thruline Entertainment
- Distributed by: Hulu
- Release date: May 6, 2017
- Running time: 92 minutes
- Country: United States
- Language: English

Batman & Bill is an American documentary film that premiered on Hulu on May 6, 2017. Directed, written and produced by Don Argott and Sheena M. Joyce, the film explores the creation of the Batman, how Bob Kane was accepted as the sole creator, and how Bill Finger was never credited for his work despite creating much of the Batman mythos.

== Premise ==
"Everyone thinks that Bob Kane created Batman, but that's not the whole truth. One author makes it his crusade to seek justice for Bill Finger, a struggling writer who was the key figure in creating the iconic superhero, from concept to costume to the very character we all know and love. Bruce Wayne may be Batman's secret identity, but his creator was always a true mystery."

The documentary focuses on the efforts of Marc Tyler Nobleman to find out about the history of Bill Finger, his involvement with creating the Batman mythos, how Bob Kane got all the initial and subsequent credit and then refusing, until his later years, to acknowledge Finger as being a key contributor, and Nobleman's efforts to find Finger's descendants and the legal battle to get Finger recognized as a co-creator of Batman. His efforts were rewarded with finding Finger's granddaughter, and DC Entertainment reaching an agreement with Finger's family in 2015, wherein all future Batman media will list the character as "created by Bob Kane with Bill Finger."

== Persons featured ==
The documentary features interviews with Marc Tyler Nobleman, Michael E. Uslan, Roy Thomas, Kevin Smith, Todd McFarlane, Charles Sinclair, Thomas Andrae, Fred Van Lente, Arlen Schumer, Carmine Infantino, Jerry Robinson, Bob Kane, Travis Langley, Athena Finger, Benjamin Zaido Cruz, Stacey C. Friends, and Alethia Mariotta.

== Production ==
For more than 75 years, Bob Kane had been the sole legally acknowledged creator of Batman. The 2012 book Bill the Boy Wonder: The Secret Co-creator of Batman by Marc Tyler Nobleman challenged that notion by pointing out how Bill Finger is actually the person behind Batman and its mythos. Upon the release of the book, other comic book historians and industry figures also offered their thoughts about Finger. In 2015, DC Entertainment and the family of Bill Finger reached an agreement that recognizes Finger's contributions to the Batman family. Finger received credit in season 2 of the TV series Gotham as well as 2016's Batman v Superman: Dawn of Justice, and now receives on-screen credit for the co-creation of Batman in DC films and television projects.

Nobleman's book served as the inspiration for the documentary. The development of the documentary was announced in 2016. The first trailer was released on April 21, 2017.

== Reception ==
On review aggregator website Rotten Tomatoes, the film has an approval rating of 88% based on eight reviews and an average rating of 7.1/10.

== See also ==
- List of original programs distributed by Hulu
