= Volodymyr Mula =

Ukrainian filmmaker and producer (born 1989)

- Володимир Мулà
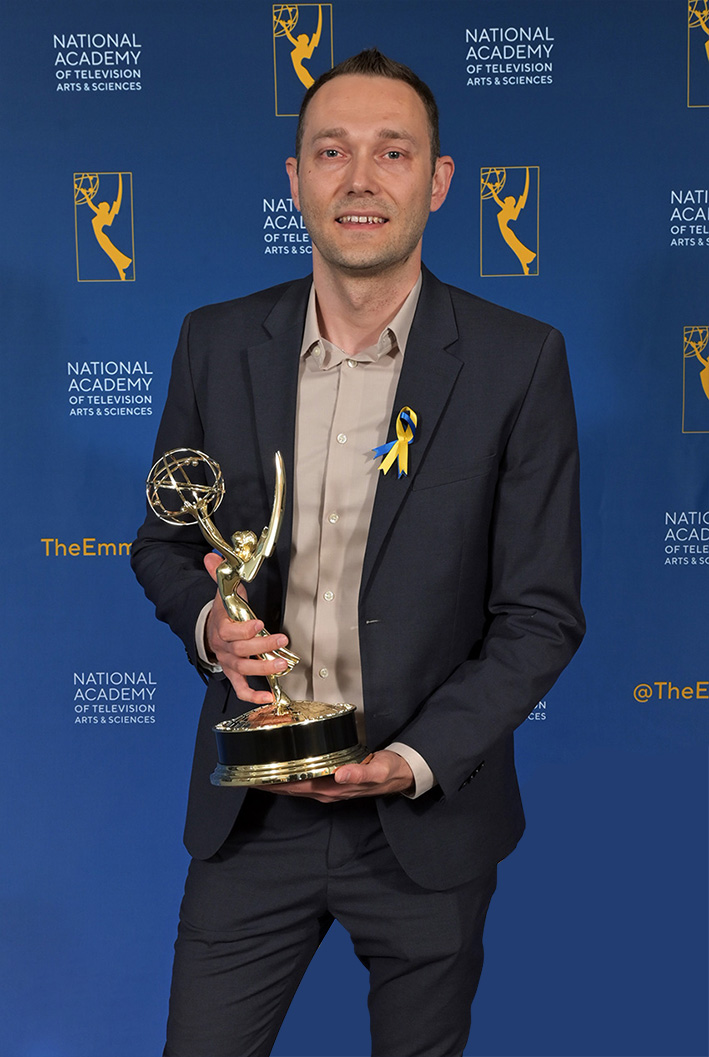
- Born: 22 October 1989 (age 36); Horodenka, Ivano-Frankisk Oblast, Ukrainian SSR, Soviet Union
- Education: Kyiv Polytechnic Institute
- Occupation: Filmmaker
- Years active: 2014–present
- Awards: Sports Emmy Awards; Honored Art Worker of Ukraine
- Website: volodymyrmula.com

Volodymyr Romanovych Mula (Ukrainian: Володимир Романович Мулà; born 22 October 1989) is a Ukrainian filmmaker, producer, writer, journalist, TV reporter. First Ukrainian director to win an Emmy Award, and is an Honored Art Worker of Ukraine.

== Early life ==
Volodymyr Mula was born in the town of Horodenka in the Ivano-Frankivsk Oblast, Ukraine.

In June 2006, he graduated from the Horodenka Gymnasium with a gold medal. He subsequently enrolled in the Faculty of Physical Engineering at the National Technical University of Ukraine "Igor Sikorsky Kyiv Polytechnic Institute". Six years later, Mula earned a master's degree in Materials Science and Engineering.

== Career ==
In September 2009, Volodymyr Mula founded TeleProstir, a new Ukrainian-language online publication. The website provided a platform for diverse media content, including news, articles, and multimedia elements.

In April 2011, Volodymyr Mula received his first accreditation for the Eurovision Song Contest, held in Düsseldorf, Germany.

In June 2014, Volodymyr Mula covered the FIFA World Cup in Rio de Janeiro, Brazil, working for several media outlets, including the Ukrainian "1+1" TV channel, the TSN web portal, Lviv Radio, and Hromadske TV.

In January 2015, Volodymyr Mula began work on a personal project, creating a documentary film titled American Dream. The following year, he released a sequel titled American Dream: In Search of the Truth.

In June and July 2016, Volodymyr Mula served as a special correspondent for BBC News Ukrainian during UEFA Euro 2016. Later that year, in August, he covered the Summer Olympic Games in Rio de Janeiro, Brazil.

In February 2018, Volodymyr Mula worked as a reporter for XSPORT.ua and ICTV, a major television network in Ukraine, during the PyeongChang 2018 Winter Olympic Games.

In April 2018, Volodymyr Mula began work on a documentary film celebrating the achievements of Ukrainians who had won the NHL Stanley Cup. The film, titled UKE, was named after the Ukrainian heritage of the players who accomplished this significant feat in the National Hockey League. The production faced significant challenges, including funding issues that led to multiple halts in filming. Despite these obstacles, the Ukrainian State Film Agency provided crucial support, enabling the project to continue. With this assistance, the film was completed and released in theaters across Ukraine on 3 December 2020. The documentary highlights Ukrainian athletes who achieved success on the international stage, a theme that resonated strongly with audiences in Ukraine. Following its release, UKE became the highest-grossing documentary in Ukraine, underscoring the public's interest in stories celebrating national accomplishments. Notably, UKE became the first Ukrainian film to be made available in its original language on four global platforms simultaneously: Amazon Prime Video, Apple TV, Google Play, and YouTube Movies & Shows.

In December 2021, Volodymyr Mula completed the production of Football Nation, a documentary film exploring the history and achievements of Ukraine's National Football Team. The film was created with the support of the Ukrainian State Film Agency and highlights the significance of the national team's 30th anniversary.

In April 2022, Volodymyr Mula worked as a director and field producer on the documentary series We're The Zoomers: Inside The World Of Today's Teens for the CNA television network. The series follows four teenagers from China, Indonesia, Singapore, and Ukraine as they navigate and define their futures on their own terms.

In August 2022, Volodymyr Mula, at the invitation of British director and producer Alex Gale, joined the international documentary project Football Must Go On as a co-director. This four-part documentary chronicles the journey of Shakhtar Donetsk, a Ukrainian football club, as they compete in the 2022–23 UEFA Champions League season amidst the ongoing war in Ukraine. The series premiered on 12 September 2023, on the Paramount+ platform.

== Films ==
Type	Year	Film					
Type	Year	Film	Director	Screenwriter	Producer	Cinematographer	Notes
Documentary	2015	American Dream	✓	✓	✓	✓	In Ukrainian
Documentary	2017	American Dream. In Search of the Truth	✓	✗	✓	✗	In Ukrainian English subtitles
Documentary	2020	UKE	✓	✗	✓	✗	In English
Documentary	2021	National Team	✓	✗	✓	✗	In Ukrainian
Docuseries	2023	Football Must Go On	✓	✗	✗	✗	The 45th Sports Emmy Awards winner in the category of "Outstanding Documentary Series – Serialized"

== Awards ==
In May 2021, Volodymyr Mula's documentary UKE was recognized as the main media event of the year at the Ukraine Sports Media Awards – 2020, organized by the Association of Sports Journalists of Ukraine.

In September 2021, Volodymyr Mula was awarded the title of Honored Art Worker of Ukraine in recognition of his significant contributions to cinematography, creative achievements, and professional excellence. This prestigious title is conferred by the President of Ukraine to individuals who have demonstrated exceptional contributions to the arts and culture of the nation.

In May 2024, at the 45th Sports Emmy Awards held at Lincoln Center's Frederick P. Rose Hall in New York City, Volodymyr Mula received the Emmy award in the category of "Outstanding Documentary Series – Serialized" for his television documentary project Football Must Go On. This honor was presented by the National Academy of Television Arts & Sciences (NATAS), marking one of the highest distinctions in U.S. television.

=== Nominations ===
In February 2021, the UKE documentary by director Volodymyr Mula was shortlisted for the AIPS Sport Media Awards 2020.

In April 2021, the UKE documentary was nominated for "Best Documentary Film of the Year" at the Golden Dzyga Ukrainian Film Academy Awards.

In January 2024, director Volodymyr Mula was nominated for the Shevchenko National Prize

In June 2024, director Volodymyr Mula was nominated for the Oleksandr Dovzhenko State Prize

== Volunteering ==
On 24 April 2022, in Baltimore, US, Volodymyr Mula organized a charity screening of his documentary UKE. All proceeds from the screening were donated to support the Armed Forces of Ukraine

In June 2023, Volodymyr Mula became an ambassador for the Unbroken Sport project, joined the initiative Lviv Mayor Andriy Sadovyy.

== The book "Wayne Called Me" ==
Volodymyr Mula's debut book, Wayne Called Me, was published in Ukraine on 1 January 2024. The book chronicles the events surrounding the creation of the UKE documentary. The foreword to the book was written by Wayne Gretzky.

== Trivia ==
- In 2015, the Security Service of Ukraine included Volodymyr Mula's report "Star Wars", which covered a match between Zorya and Legia in Kyiv, in their investigation into the clash between Ukrainian and Polish fans in downtown Kyiv in August of that year.
- Following Brazil's 1–7 defeat to Germany in the 2014 World Cup semi-final, a Brazilian fan attacked Volodymyr Mula, a correspondent for the Ukrainian channel "1+1", during a live broadcast. Mula, who was wearing a German national team shirt at the time, managed to calm the fan and continue the broadcast shortly after the incident.
- Volodymyr Mula is the only Ukrainian journalist to have worked at three major international events in 2016: the Rio 2016 Olympics, Stockholm Eurovision 2016, and UEFA Euro 2016 France.
