= Two Days in April =

- Directed by: Don Argott
- Produced by: Sheena M. Joyce; Dave Broome; Liesl Copland; Ted Sarandos; Jack Tiernan
- Starring: Derek Hagan; Clint Ingram; DonTrell Moore; Travis Wilson
- Cinematography: Don Argott
- Edited by: Demian Fenton
- Production companies: 25/7 Productions; 9.14 Pictures
- Distributed by: Red Envelope Entertainment
- Release date: April 9, 2007 (United States)
- Running time: 90 minutes
- Country: United States
- Language: English
- Budget: $550,000 (est)

Two Days in April is a 2007 documentary film by director Don Argott that follows four NFL prospects (Derek Hagan, Clint Ingram, DonTrell Moore and Travis Wilson) through the process of preparing for and participating in the 2006 NFL draft. The film received its name in reference to the NFL draft weekend, and focuses on the intense training leading up to the NFL draft and the emotional roller coaster of draft day. Three of the players were selected within six picks of each other in the third round.

Other individuals in the documentary include Bruce Allen, Tom Condon, Chuck Cook, Jon Gruden, Steve Hale, Michael Johnson, Mel Kiper Jr., Andy Reid, Marty Schottenheimer, Dick Selcer, Rob Stone, Lionel Taylor, Travis Wilson, and Wendy Wilson.

== Background ==
In the fall of 2005, Dave Broome, executive producer of The Biggest Loser, learned of the Tom Condon film concept where cameras would follow Condon's latest clients as they prepared for the 2006 NFL draft. Condon himself did not expect payment, but requested being listed as an executive producer on the project. After studying the idea, Broome decided the concept would be better suited for a documentary than for a feature film, modifying the original Condon concept of simply following the subjects to include interviews and personal vignettes within the narrative. Upon Condon's agreeing, Broome arranged financing and distribution. When Red Envelope Entertainment gave the go-ahead, Broome in 2005 hired Don Argott to direct, and in winter 2006, Argott and Condon went to the IMG training academy in Bradenton, Florida to meet the players and begin filming.

However, during production, Condon left IMG to join Creative Artists Agency, taking his clients with him. One of the contractual conditions for filming IMG athletes at the IMG Academy, was that the film would be subject to IMG's artistic approval. With Condon leaving the project, Broome and Argott were worried that IMG would invoke this clause to shut down the project.

After completion of principal filming, Argott spent several months editing more than 150 hours of video to create the 92-minute film. Red Envelope Entertainment promoted the film to home video and television distribution contacts, and even considered trimming the film to a 42-minute length for ESPN to include as part of their 2007 NFL draft coverage. However, during the film's post-production, Netflix learned that Condon refused to sign a release to appear on film.

According to his attorney, Condon was unhappy after seeing a screening of the film, believing that it did not reflect his clients or the draft processes properly, and asserting that the production company had verbally promised him the final right to artistic sign-off. Broome contended that Condon wished to sabotage the project because he did not do well in the draft and was worried other sports agents might use this as leverage against him. Broome further denied that he or any producer would ever verbally give away final approval to a subject in a documentary. In 2007, the NFL and NFL Properties expressed concerns about whether the filmmakers had obtained rights to certain used footage, and shortly thereafter ESPN broke off negotiations.

Broome felt this was because ESPN would rightly question why an executive producer would disavow a project and why the NFL would question rights to air footage. And when the 2007 NFL draft passed without the film being able to be aired, Broome's production company, First and Ten Productions, filed a lawsuit against Condon and NFL Productions. Included among their charges were "intentional interference with a contractual relationship," alleging that "Condon willfully and maliciously interfered ... by falsely representing to the National Football League that Plaintiff had not obtained all necessary rights to the combine footage or to the use of Condon's name, image and likeness." The suit against the NFL was settled for undisclosed terms and they were subsequently removed as defendants in the lawsuit, leaving Condon as sole defendant.
