= Sarah Burns =

American actress (born 1981)

- Born: Long Island, New York, U.S.
- Occupation: Actress
- Years active: 2005–present
- Children: 1

Sarah Burns is an American film and television actress and comedian, best known for playing Krista on HBO's Enlightened.

== Early life ==
Born on Long Island, New York, Burns has performed improvisational comedy regularly at the Upright Citizens Brigade Theatre in New York City, New York.

== Career ==
Burns is known for her appearances in comedic films and television series. Her film roles include Anne in Slow Learners (2015) opposite Adam Pally, Hailey in I Love You, Man (2009), Harper in Going the Distance (2010) and Janine Groff in Life as We Know It (2010).

She has also appeared in television productions including Damage Control (one episode; 2005), Flight of the Conchords (one episode; 2007), Party Down (one episode; 2010) and Ben and Kate (one episode; 2012). She had a costarring role in the short film Cried Suicide (2010), which was screened at the 2010 Tribeca Film Festival. Her short film "The First Step" (2012) premiered at the 2013 Seattle International Film Festival.

She appears as part of a recurring cast of sketch players for the Comedy Central television series Drunk History, which premiered in July 2013. In 2015, Burns was a series regular in second season of the FX comedy series Married. Burns was cast as Assistant District Attorney Emily Sinclair in Season Two of the show How to Get Away With Murder.

In 2009, Entertainment Weekly named her one of the "25 Funniest Actresses in Hollywood". In June 2013, Entertainment Weekly named Burns one of "15 Actresses We're Rooting For" as part of its "Emmy Watch".

In 2016, Burns appeared as Margie Turley in the Lorne Michaels-produced Brother Nature. In 2017, Burns appeared as Gabrielle in the HBO original miniseries Big Little Lies and in the Netflix series Wet Hot American Summer: Ten Years Later.

In 2020, Burns appeared as Kaylie in the Netflix film Desperados as well as a major role in the Netflix series Aunty Donna's Big Ol' House of Fun.

== Filmography ==
=== Film ===
Year	Title	Role	Notes
2007	Serial	Moira Haggerty	
2009	I Love You, Man	Hailey	
2010	Cop Out	Mortuary Attendant	Uncredited
2010	Monogamy	Ella	
2010	Going the Distance	Harper	
2010	Life as We Know It	Janine Groff	
2013	A.C.O.D.	Margo	
2013	Enough Said	Female Hiker #1	
2015	Grandma	Protester	
2015	Slow Learners	Anne Martin	
2016	Brother Nature	Margie Turley	
2017	Unforgettable	Sarah	
2020	Desperados	Kaylie	
2020	Eat Wheaties!	Kate Drew	
2021	Werewolves Within	Gwen	
2022	Moving On	Allie	
2024	Unfrosted	Mrs. Schwinn	

=== Television ===
Year	Title	Role	Notes
2004	Jump Cuts	Faye	Episode #1.2
2005	My Wife, the Ghost	Sally Wilson	4 episodes
2005	I Love the '30s	Faye Grey	Episode: "The Legend of Babe Ruth"
2007	Bronx World Travelers	Reporter #1	Episode: "Press Conference"
2007	Flight of the Conchords	Summer	Episode: "New Fans"
2010	Party Down	Donna Mullens	Episode: "Not on Your Wife Opening Night"
2011–2013	Enlightened	Krista Jacobs	16 episodes
2013	Ben and Kate	Stephanie	Episode: "Bake Off"
2013	The New Normal	Megan	Episode: "Dairy Queen"
2013	First Dates with Toby Harris	Caroline	Episode: "Hello"
2013	Drunk History	Various	8 episodes
2013	Friend Us	Claire Ridings	Episode: "Pilot"
2013	The Mindy Project	Amy	Episode: "You've Got Sext"
2013	The Eric Andre Show	Herself	Episode: Wink Martindale/Sarah Burns
2014	Garfunkel and Oates	Cheryl	2 episodes
2015	New Girl	Deb	Episode: "Coming Out"
2015	Married	Amy	8 episodes
2015	How to Get Away with Murder	Emily Sinclair	10 episodes
2017	Big Little Lies	Gabrielle	6 episodes
2017	Wet Hot American Summer: Ten Years Later	Claire	8 episodes
2017	Speechless	Marci	Episode: "J-J'S D-R-- DREAM"
2017	Do You Want to See a Dead Body?	Sarah	Episode: "A Body and a Crater"
2017	The Oversharer	Woman	Episode: "Thong"
2018	The 5th Quarter	Janet Jaronski	Episode: "A Lift of Their Own"
2018	Me, Myself & I	Lisa	3 episodes
2018	Sideswiped	Nicole	Episode: "The Party"
2018	American Vandal	Angela Montgomery	6 episodes
2019–2023	Barry	Detective Mae Dunn	13 episodes
2020	Hot Spot	Julie	Episode: "In the Wee Small Hours of the Morning"
2020	Aunty Donna's Big Ol' House of Fun	Pirate	Episode: "Treasure"
2021	Immoral Compass	Kimberly	Episode: "Part 2: Secrets"
2024	Chad	Jocelyn	Episode: "New Brother"

=== Video games ===
Year	Title	Role	Notes
2025	Goodnight Universe	Wendy	
