= Tiny Shoulders: Rethinking Barbie =

- Directed by: Andrea Blaugrund Nevins
- Produced by: Andrea Blaugrund Nevins; Cristan Crocker
- Starring: Gloria Steinem; Roxane Gay; Peggy Orenstein
- Cinematography: Geoffrey Franklin
- Edited by: Azin Samari
- Music by: Craig Richey
- Production company: Rare Bird Films
- Distributed by: Hulu
- Release dates: April 25, 2018 (TFF); April 27, 2018
- Running time: 92 minutes
- Country: United States
- Language: English

Tiny Shoulders: Rethinking Barbie is an American documentary film that premiered on April 27, 2018 on Hulu. Directed, written, and produced by Andrea Blaugrund Nevins, it explores the creation of the Barbie doll, the effect it has had on culture, and its evolution over the decades. For years, Barbie for some can spark unrealistic expectations for younger girls and even cause body image issues. According to Time, this petite, tall and curvy doll known as Barbie, constitutes as a major figure of the feminist movement and symbolizes male oppression. She has sparked debate and controversy for a variety of reasons which this documentary aims to capture.

== Premise ==
Tiny Shoulders: Rethinking Barbie takes "a retrospective look at the doll’s unexpected origins and what she represents today — part fashion icon, part lightning rod. It included interviews with Gloria Steinem, Roxane Gay, Peggy Orenstein, Mattel insiders, cultural historians, and others and feature newly discovered footage and unprecedented access to the inner workings of Mattel during Barbie’s biggest reinvention."

== Production ==
=== Development ===
On July 27, 2017, it was announced at the annual Television Critics Association summer press tour that Hulu had greenlit a feature documentary from Andrea Blaugrund Nevins and her production company Rare Bird Films. Nevins is producing alongside Cristan Crocker and the film is expected to include interviews with people such as Gloria Steinem, Roxane Gay, Peggy Orenstein.

== Release ==
=== Marketing ===
On April 5, 2018, Hulu released the first trailer for the film.

=== Premiere ===
On April 25, 2018, the film held its world premiere during the annual Tribeca Film Festival at the Festival Hub at Spring Studios in New York City. Its premiere was part of the festival's "Spotlight Documentary" series of films that were being screened.

=== Distribution ===
On May 9, 2018, it was announced that Entertainment One had secured international distribution rights for the film.

== Reception ==
Tiny Shoulders: Rethinking Barbie has been met with a positive response from critics. On the review aggregation website Rotten Tomatoes, the film holds an 81% approval rating with an average rating of 7.2/10 based on 16 reviews. The site's critical consensus reads, "A thoughtful rumination on beauty standards and feminism, Tiny Shoulders goes beyond plastic observations to create an even-handed examination of Barbie's role in the broader culture."

== See also ==
- List of original programs distributed by Hulu
- United States in the 1950s
- Barbie Liberation Organization
