= Sheena M. Joyce =

American film producer (born 1976)

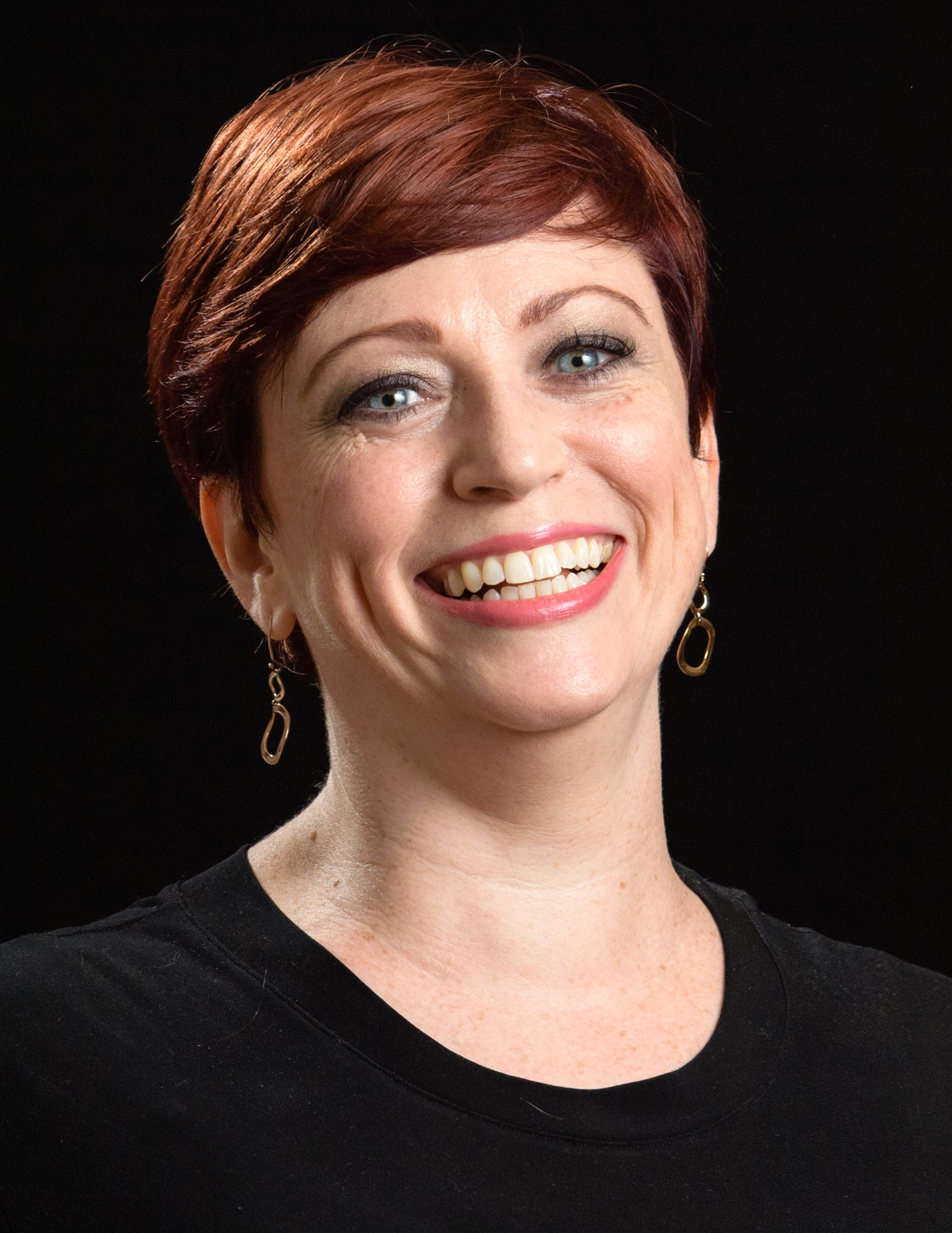
- Joyce in 2019
- Born: July 26, 1976 (age 49)
- Occupations: Producer; director
- Notable work: The Atomic States of America (2012); Batman & Bill (2017); Believer (2018); Bill Maudin:If It's Bit, Hit It (2021)
- Website: https://www.914pictures.com

Sheena M. Joyce (born July 26, 1976) is an American film producer and director currently based in Philadelphia, Pennsylvania, United States.

Joyce made her co-directorial debut with Don Argott with 2012's The Atomic States of America and has since co-directed/directed the romantic comedy Slow Learners (2015), Framing John DeLorean with Alec Baldwin (2019), Taylor Swift: The End of an Era (2025) and others.

Joyce has produced many TV series including The Home Team: NYJets, and In the Kitchen with Harry Hamlin. She has also produced documentaries including Kelce (2023), Dio: Dreamers Never Die (2022), Rock School (2005), Head Space (2006), Two Days in April (2007), The Art of the Steal (2009), Last Days Here (2011), Batman & Bill (2017), and Bill Mauldin: If It's Big, Hit It (2021).

Joyce has been nominated for several Emmy Awards. She formed Philadelphia-based 9.14 Pictures with director and cinematographer Don Argott in 2002.

Joyce is a graduate of Bryn Mawr College and a lifelong Philadelphia Eagles fan.

== Filmography ==
Film
Year	Title	Director	Writer	Producer	Notes	Ref.
2005	Rock School			Yes		
2006	Head Space			Yes		
2006	Of Darkness			Yes	Executive producer	
2007	Two Days in April			Yes	co-producer	
2009	The Art of the Steal			Yes		
2011	Last Days Here			Yes		
2012	The Atomic States of America	Yes		Yes	co-directed by Don Argott	
2014	As the Palaces Burn			Yes		
2015	Signals			Yes		
2015	Slow Learners	Yes			co-directed by Don Argott	
2016	A Hug from Paul Ryan	Yes		Yes	co-directed by Don Argott; Short producer	
2017	Batman & Bill	Yes		Yes	co-directed by Don Argott	
2017	11/8/16	Yes		Yes	co-directed by; Duane Andersen; Don Argott; Yung Chang; Garth Donovan; Petra Epperlein; Vikram Gandhi; Raul Gasteazoro; J. Gonçalves; Andrew Grace; Alma Har'el; Daniel Junge; Alison Klayman; Ciara Lacy; Martha Shane; Elaine McMillion Sheldon; Bassam Tariq; Michael Tucker; Segment producer	
2019	Framing John DeLorean	Yes		Yes	co-directed by Don Argott	
2019	Maybe This Year (2019)			Yes	Executive producer	
2021	Keep Sweet (2021)			Yes		
2021	Cat People (2021)	Yes			co-directed by Don Argott	
2021	Bill Mauldin: If It's Big, Hit It	Yes		Yes	co-directed by Don Argott	
2021	Slugfest	Yes	Yes		co-directed by Don Argott	
2022	Dio: Dreamers Never Die			Yes		
2022	The Bond	Yes			co-directed by Don Argott	
2022	Spector	Yes			co-directed by Don Argott	
2023	Kelce			Yes		
2023	Thick Skin			Yes		
2023	In the Kitchen with Harry Hamlin	Yes		Yes	co-directed by Don Argott; Executive producer	
2025	Taylor Swift: The End of an Era	Yes			co-directed by Don Argott	
