= Bill Finger =

American comics writer (1914–1974)

- Finger in 1933
- Born: Milton Finger; February 8, 1914 Denver, Colorado, U.S.
- Died: c. January 18, 1974 (aged 59) New York City, U.S.
- Area: Writer
- Notable works: Batman; Detective Comics; Green Lantern
- Awards: Jack Kirby Hall of Fame (1994); Will Eisner Comic Book Hall of Fame (1999); Inkpot Award (2014)
- Spouses: Ethel "Portia" Finger (née Epstein; 1943–1950s); Lyn Simmons (about 1968–1971)
- Children: 1

Signature
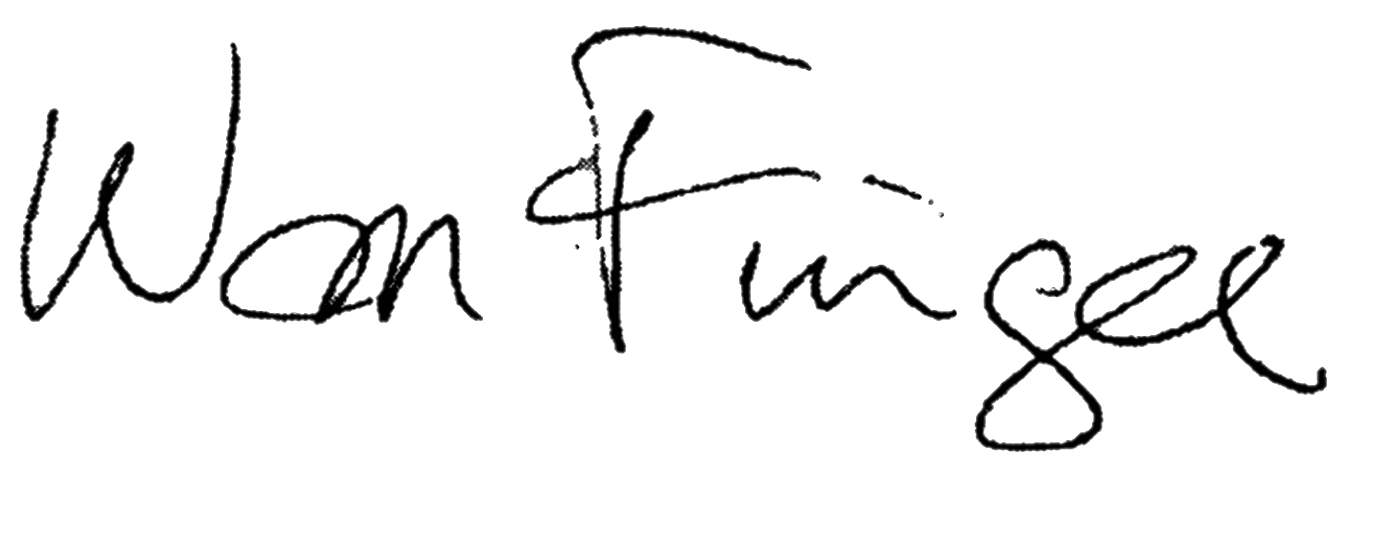

Milton "Bill" Finger (February 8, 1914 – c. January 18, 1974) was an American comic book writer who is credited with co-creating the DC Comics character Batman with Bob Kane. Despite making major (sometimes, signature) contributions as an innovative writer, visionary mythos/world builder and illustration architect, Finger (like other creators of his era) was often given "ghostwriter" status on comics he created or co-created, including those featuring Batman and the original Green Lantern. In recent years, Finger has received recognition for his contributions.

While Kane privately admitted in a 1980s audio interview with his autobiographer that Finger was responsible for "50–75% of all the creativity in Batman", he publicly denied Finger had been anything more than a subcontractor executing Kane's ideas for decades. As a result, Finger died in obscurity and poverty while the Batman brand, and Kane, amassed international fame and wealth. In the 2000s, Finger biographer Marc Tyler Nobleman's research uncovered previously unknown heirs. At the urging of Nobleman, the online comics fan community, and others, Finger's granddaughter revived the campaign to have Finger recognized for his work, which continued for years. In 2015, DC Comics's parent company conditionally agreed to recognize Finger's intellectual property claim as co-creator of the Batman characters and mythos, officially adding his name, going forward, to the "created by" credit line Kane had been contractually guaranteed in 1939.

== Early life ==
Bill Finger was born in Denver, Colorado, in 1914 to an Ashkenazi Jewish family. His father, Louis Finger, was born in Austria-Hungary in 1890 and emigrated to the U.S. in 1907. Little is known about his biological mother Rosa Rosenblatt. His stepmother Tessie was born in 1892 in New York City. The family also included two daughters (or possibly nieces raised as daughters), Emily and Gilda. The family moved to the Bronx, New York City, where during the Great Depression Louis Finger was forced to close his tailor shop. Finger graduated from DeWitt Clinton High School in The Bronx in 1933.

== Career ==
=== Comics ===
An aspiring writer and a part-time shoe salesman, Finger joined Bob Kane's nascent studio in 1938 after having met Kane, a fellow DeWitt Clinton alumnus, at a party. Kane later offered him a job ghost writing the strips Rusty and Clip Carson.

==== Batman ====
Early the following year, National Comics' success with the seminal superhero Superman in Action Comics prompted editors to scramble for similar heroes. In response, Kane conceived the "Bat-Man". Finger recalled Kane

... had an idea for a character called 'Batman', and he'd like me to see the drawings. I went over to Kane's, and he had drawn a character who looked very much like Superman with kind of ... reddish tights, I believe, with boots ... no gloves, no gauntlets ... with a small domino mask, swinging on a rope. He had two stiff wings that were sticking out, looking like bat wings. And under it was a big sign ... BATMAN.

Finger offered such suggestions as giving the character a cowl with pointed bat-ears instead of the domino mask, a cape instead of wings, adding gloves, and changing the red sections of the costume to gray. Finger later said his suggestions to have his eyes covered by white lenses was influenced by Lee Falk's popular The Phantom, a syndicated newspaper comic strip character with which Kane was also familiar, and that he devised the name Bruce Wayne for the character's secret identity. Finger said, "Bruce Wayne's first name came from Robert Bruce, the Scottish patriot. Wayne, being a playboy, was a man of gentry. I searched for a name that would suggest colonialism. I tried Adams, Hancock ... then I thought of Mad Anthony Wayne." Kane decades later in his autobiography described Finger as "a contributing force on Batman right from the beginning ... I made Batman a superhero-vigilante when I first created him. Bill turned him into a scientific detective." Nobleman said, "Bob [Kane] showed Bat-Man to [editor] Vin [Sullivan]—without Bill. Vin promptly wanted to run Bat-Man, and Bob negotiated a deal—without including Bill."

Finger wrote both the initial script for Batman's debut in Detective Comics #27 (May 1939) and the character's second appearance in Detective Comics #28 (June 1939), while Kane provided art. Batman proved a breakout hit, and Finger went on to write many of the early Batman stories, including making major contributions to the Joker character. Batman background artist and letterer George Roussos recalled:

What was good about Bill was that whenever he wrote a plot, he did a lot of research for it. Whether the setting was a railroad station or a factory, he would find a photo reference, usually from National Geographic, and give Bob all the research to draw from. He was very orderly and methodical. His only problem was that he couldn't sustain the work ... he couldn't produce material regularly enough.

Robin was introduced as Batman's sidekick in Detective Comics #38 (April 1940). When Kane wanted Robin's origin to parallel Batman's, Finger made Robin's parents circus performers murdered while performing their trapeze act. Finger recalled:

Robin was an outgrowth of a conversation I had with Bob. As I said, Batman was a combination of Douglas Fairbanks and Sherlock Holmes. Holmes had his Watson. The thing that bothered me was that Batman didn't have anyone to talk to, and it got a little tiresome always having him thinking. I found that as I went along Batman needed a Watson to talk to. That's how Robin came to be. Bob called me over and said he was going to put a boy in the strip to identify with Batman. I thought it was a great idea".

Comics historian Jim Steranko wrote in 1970 that Finger's slowness as a writer led Batman editor Whitney Ellsworth to suggest Kane replace him, a claim reflected in Joe Desris' description of Finger as "notoriously tardy". During Finger's absence, Gardner Fox contributed scripts that introduced Batman's early "Bat-" arsenal (the utility belt, the Bat-gyro/-plane and the Batarang). Upon his return, Finger is credited with providing the name "Gotham City". Finger wrote the debut issue of Batman's self-titled comic book series which introduced the Joker and the Catwoman. Among the things that made his stories distinctive were a use of giant-sized props: enlarged pennies, sewing machines, or typewriters. Finger seemed to avoid having Batman operate out of a cave in the early stories, to circumvent being too similar to the Phantom and Zorro. Instead Finger indicated that Wayne merely used "underground hangars" on the property to store vehicles. The Batcave first appeared in the 1943 Columbia serial starring Lewis Wilson and the comics followed suit thereafter. Donald Clough Cameron created the concept of Batman having a trophy section in the Batcave. One of the prevalently featured trophies in Batman's Batcave, the giant replica of a Lincoln cent, was introduced in a story written by Finger. He was one of the writers of the syndicated Batman comic strip from 1943 to 1946.

Eventually, Finger left Kane's studio to work directly for DC Comics, where he supplied scripts for characters including Batman and Superman. A part of the Superman mythos which had originated on the radio program made its way into the comic books when kryptonite was featured in a story by Finger and Al Plastino in Superman #61 (Nov. 1949). As writer of the Superboy series, Finger created Lana Lang, a love-interest for the teenage superhero. Continuing his Batman work, he and artist Sheldon Moldoff introduced Ace the Bat-Hound in Batman #92 (June 1955), Bat-Mite in Detective Comics #267 (May 1959), Clayface in Detective Comics #298 (December 1961), and Betty Kane, the original Bat-Girl in Batman #139 (April 1961). Finger wrote for other companies, including Fawcett Comics, Quality Comics and Marvel Comics' 1940s predecessor, Timely Comics. Finger created the All-Winners Squad in All Winners Comics #19 (Fall 1946) for Timely.

==== Batman villains ====
Finger provided an account on the creation of Joker in 1966, though admittedly unsure if it was Robinson or Kane who initiated the initial concept:

I got a call from Bob Kane ... He had a new villain. When I arrived he was holding a playing card. Apparently Jerry Robinson or Bob, I don't recall who, looked at the card and they had an idea for a character ... the Joker. Bob made a rough sketch of it. At first it didn't look much like the Joker. It looked more like a clown. But I remembered that Grosset & Dunlap formerly issued very cheap editions of classics by Alexandre Dumas and Victor Hugo ... The volume I had was The Man Who Laughs — his face had been permanently operated on so that he will always have this perpetual grin. And it looked absolutely weird. I cut the picture out of the book and gave it to Bob, who drew the profile and gave it a more sinister aspect. Then he worked on the face; made him look a little clown-like, which accounted for his white face, red lips, green hair. And that was the Joker!

Finger also asserted that the creation of Penguin was fully his in the same interview, outright refuting Kane's claims:

Oh, he never came off a package of Kools...I happened to be looking at an old copy of the old Saturday Evening Post that had an article on the Emperor Penguin. It had photographs of Emperor Penguins waddling about. To me they looked exactly like portly Englishmen on their way to their private clubs. Naturally when you think of an Englishman, you think of the perpetual umbrella. So, I decided to make a character who...well, it can't be just an umbrella. I decided to gimmick them. I gave him a top hat, make him looking like the Englishman, and gave him a thousand umbrellas, gimmicked. Alas, we have the Penguin.

Finger created the Scarecrow and it is believed that Sheldon Moldoff penciled his first appearance. Kane created Two-Face and Finger expanded his characterization in the first script for Detective Comics #66 (Aug. 1942). The Riddler was created by Finger and designed by Dick Sprang in issue #140 (Oct. 1948). The Calendar Man was another villain created by Finger without input from Kane.

==== Green Lantern ====
Finger collaborated with artist and character creator Martin Nodell on the original Green Lantern, Alan Scott, who debuted in All-American Comics #16 (July 1940). Both writer and artist received a byline on the strip, with Nodell in the earliest issues using the pseudonym "Mart Dellon".

According to Nodell, Finger was brought in to write scripts after Nodell had already conceived the character. Nodell recalled in an undated, latter-day interview:

When I sent it in, I waited into the second week before I heard the word to come in. I was ushered into Mr. [Max] Gaines' office, publisher, and after sitting a long time and flipping through the pages of my presentation, he announced, "We like it!" And then, "Get to work!" I did the first five pages of an eight-page story, and then they called in Bill Finger to help. We worked on it for seven years [through 1947].

=== Screenwriter ===
As a screenwriter, Finger wrote or co-wrote the films Death Comes to Planet Aytin, The Green Slime, and Track of the Moon Beast, and contributed scripts to the TV series Hawaiian Eye and 77 Sunset Strip. He and Charles Sinclair wrote the two-part episode "The Clock King's Crazy Crimes / The Clock King Gets Crowned", airing October 12–13, 1966, in season two of the live-action Batman TV series. It was his first public credit for any Batman story.

== Credit ==
Artist Bob Kane negotiated a contract with National Comics (the future DC Comics) that signed away ownership of the character in exchange for, among other compensations, a sole mandatory byline on all Batman comics (and adaptations thereof). Finger's name, in contrast, did not appear as an official credit on Batman stories or films until 2015. Finger began receiving limited acknowledgment for his writing work in the 1960s; the letters page of Batman #169 (Feb. 1965), for example, features editor Julius Schwartz naming Finger as creator of the Riddler.

Additionally, Finger did receive credit for his work for National's sister company, All-American Publications, during that time. For example, the first Wildcat story, in Sensation Comics #1 (Jan. 1942), has the byline "by Irwin Hasen and Bill Finger", and the first Green Lantern story (see above) is credited to "Mart Dellon and Bill Finger". National later absorbed All-American. National's practice in the 1950s made formal bylines rare in comics, with DC regularly granting credit only to Kane; William Moulton Marston, creator of Wonder Woman, under his pseudonym of Charles Moulton; and to Sheldon Mayer.

In 1989, Kane acknowledged Finger as "a contributing force" in the character's creation, and wrote, "Now that my long-time friend and collaborator is gone, I must admit that Bill never received the fame and recognition he deserved. He was an unsung hero ... I often tell my wife, if I could go back fifteen years, before he died, I would like to say. 'I'll put your name on it now. You deserve it.'" Comics historian Ron Goulart referred to Batman as the "creation of artist Bob Kane and writer Bill Finger".

Finger's contemporary, artist and writer Jerry Robinson, who worked with Kane from the beginning, said, "[Bill] had more to do with the molding of Batman than Bob. He just did so many things at the beginning, ... creating almost all the other characters, ... the whole persona, the whole temper." Batman inker George Roussos, another contemporary, said, "Bob Kane had rough ideas, but Bill was the man behind Batman." A DC Comics press release in 2007 said, "Kane, along with writer Bill Finger, had just created Batman for DC predecessor National Comics." Likewise, DC editor Paul Levitz wrote, "The Darknight [sic] Detective debuted in [Detective] #27, the creation of Bob Kane and Bill Finger."

Writer John Broome and penciler Gil Kane created the comic-book villain William Hand, a.k.a. Black Hand, as a tribute to Finger, on whom the character's name and likeness were based.

In September 2015, DC Entertainment announced Finger would receive credit on the 2016 superhero film Batman v Superman: Dawn of Justice and the second season of Gotham, following a deal between the Finger family and DC. Finger received his first formal credit as a creator of Batman in the October 2015 comic books Batman and Robin Eternal #3 and Batman: Arkham Knight Genesis #3. The updated acknowledgement for the character appeared as "Batman created by Bob Kane with Bill Finger".

== Awards ==
Finger was posthumously inducted into the Jack Kirby Hall of Fame in 1994 and the Will Eisner Award Hall of Fame in 1999. In 1985, DC Comics named Finger as one of the honorees in the company's 50th anniversary publication Fifty Who Made DC Great. In his honor, Comic-Con International established in 2005 the Bill Finger Award for Excellence in Comic Book Writing, which is given annually to "two recipients — one living and one deceased — who have produced a significant body of work in the comics field". Finger posthumously received an Inkpot Award in 2014.

== Legacy ==
On December 8, 2017, the southeast corner of East 192nd Street and the Grand Concourse in the Bronx was named "Bill Finger Way". The corner was chosen for its proximity to Poe Park, where Finger and Kane used to meet to discuss their Batman character. Finger is the subject of the Hulu original documentary, Batman & Bill, which premiered in 2017.

== Personal life ==
Finger married twice. He and his first wife, Portia, had a son: Frederick (nicknamed "Fred"). After their divorce, Finger married Edith "Lyn" Simmons in the late 1960s, but they were no longer married when he died in 1974.

Finger was last seen alive on January 16, 1974. His friend and longtime writing partner Charles Sinclair found Finger dead at his home on January 18 at the condominium Allen House at 340 East 51st Street in Manhattan. The cause of death was occlusive coronary atherosclerosis. His death was not widely reported at the time. Finger had suffered three heart attacks, in 1963, 1970, and 1973. Although it was long believed by Sinclair and others that Finger was buried in an unmarked potter's field grave, his body was actually claimed by his son, Fred, who honored his wish to be cremated, and spread his ashes in the shape of a bat on a beach in Oregon. The first story of the issue Batman #259 in December 1974 would be dedicated to Finger's memory.

Fred Finger had a daughter, Athena, born two years after Bill Finger's death. Fred died of complications from AIDS on January 13, 1992. Athena and her son are his only known living heirs, and her attempts (at the prompting of Nobleman and comics fans, and aided by her attorney half-sister) to restore Bill's legacy resulted in Warner Bros.'s 2015 decision to officially recognize Finger as co-creator of Batman on film and TV projects going forward.
