= Don Argott =

American film director

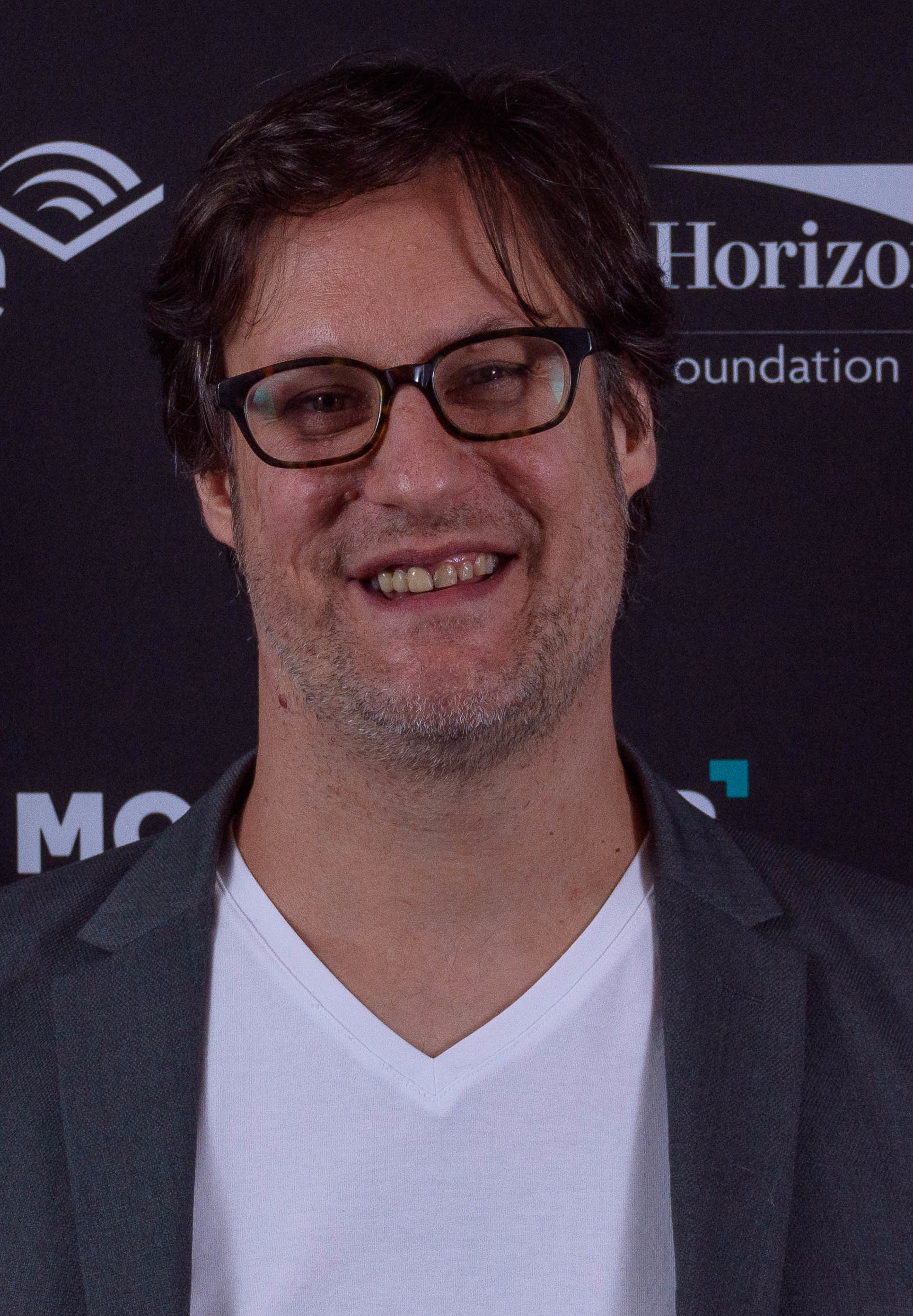
- Argott at the 2018 Montclair Film Festival
- Born: September 14, 1972 (age 53); Pequannock Township, New Jersey, U.S.
- Occupations: Film director, producer, screenwriter, cinematographer, musician
- Website: www.914pictures.com

Don Argott (born September 14, 1972) is an American documentary filmmaker and musician. He has directed several documentary films and has also worked as a producer and cinematographer. He co-owns the production company 9.14 Pictures with producer Sheena M. Joyce.

== Biography ==
Originally from Pequannock Township, New Jersey, Argott currently resides in Philadelphia, Pennsylvania.

He has worked with film score in a rock band format, releasing original music under the name Pornosonic. Pornosonic's work has been featured in numerous films, including Old School. Argott currently plays guitar in the proto-metal band Serpent Throne along with 9.14 Pictures editor Demian Fenton.

== Filmography ==
- Rock School (2005)
- Two Days in April (2007)
- The Art of the Steal (2009)
- Last Days Here (2011) (co-directed with Demian Fenton)
- The Atomic States of America (2012, co-directed with Sheena M. Joyce)
- Slow Learners (2015, co-directed with Sheena M. Joyce)
- As The Palaces Burn (2014)
- Batman & Bill (2017, co-directed with Sheena M. Joyce)
- Taylor Swift: The End of an Era (2025, co-directed with Sheena M. Joyce)
