= Demian Fenton =

American filmmaker and musician

- Born: March 6, 1975 (age 51)
- Occupations: Editor, director, musician
- Website: http://www.914pictures.com

Demian Fenton (born March 6, 1975) is an American filmmaker and musician from the Pocono Mountains region of Pennsylvania, and currently residing in Philadelphia.

Fenton edited the films Rock School (2005), Head Space (2006) (which he also appeared in,) Two Days in April (2007), and The Art of the Steal (2009), and The Atomic States of America (2012). He made his co-directorial debut with 2011's Last Days Here.

As a musician, Fenton has also played guitar in the heavy metal bands Otesanek, Pissgrave, Puritan and Facedowninshit. Until recently, he played guitar in the metal band Serpent Throne with Don Argott, a frequent film collaborator.

== Filmography ==
Director

- Last Days Here (2011) (co-directed with Don Argott)

Editor

- Rock School (2005)
- Head Space (2006)
- Two Days in April (2007)
- The Art of the Steal (2009)
- The Atomic States of America (2012)
- Taylor Swift: The End of an Era (2025)
