= Dominick the Donkey =

Song by Lou Monte
- Language: English
- B-side: "Christmas At Our House"
- Released: December 1960; September 28, 2011 (re-release)
- Recorded: 1960
- Genre: Christmas; folk
- Length: 2:31
- Label: Roulette Records, Dexterity Records
- Songwriters: Ray Allen, Sam Saltzberg, Wandra Merrell

"Dominick the Donkey" (subtitled "The Italian Christmas Donkey") is a Christmas song written by Ray Allen, Sam Saltzberg and Wandra Merrell, and was recorded by Lou Monte in 1960, on Roulette Records. The song describes Dominick, a donkey who helps Santa Claus bring presents ("made in Brooklyn") to children in Italy due to the reindeer, despite their flight, being unable to climb the mountainous terrain. The song was re-released onto Amazon on September 26, 2011, on Dexterity Records. The spelling of "Dominick" was modified to "Dominic" for the re-release. It was included in Volume 2 of the Ultimate Christmas Album series produced by Collectables Records and on the Christmas compilation album Merry Xmas 2011 by Cinquenta Musica.

The song was listed at No. 14 in Billboard's "Bubbling under the Hot 100" list in December 1960.

== Christmas 2011 number 1 campaign ==
In the United Kingdom, the song was used extensively on the BBC Radio 1 morning programme The Chris Moyles Show in reference to Newsbeat newsreader and regular show contributor Dominic Byrne around the Christmas 2011 period. It appeared on the UK Singles Chart following a campaign by Chris Moyles. In the week leading up to Christmas of 2011, the show hinted at listeners to download the song from iTunes and Amazon. This led to the song being the No. 2 song on the British iTunes chart between December 19–25, 2011. The song eventually peaked at No. 3 on the UK Singles Chart for the week ending December 31, 2011.

== Cover versions ==
In 2023, the song was covered by The Philly Specials – a vocal trio composed of Philadelphia Eagles offensive linemen Lane Johnson, Jason Kelce, and Jordan Mailata – featuring Jason's brother and Kansas City Chiefs tight end Travis Kelce. It was released as a part of the trio's second Philadelphia-themed Christmas album, A Philly Special Christmas Special. The lyrics in this release are altered slightly to state that the presents Dominick is carrying for the children of Italy were "made in South Philly" – Philadelphia's traditional Italian immigrant neighborhood – rather than in New York City's traditional Italian immigrant borough of Brooklyn.

The recording became a fan favorite of the album, with Jason Kelce citing it as a favorite in his household. The War on Drugs's drummer Charlie Hall, who produced the full album, said of the song: "We turned it into this lysergic fever dream. It's one of these things where the song is so bizarre anyway, why not lean into it and make the most wild and strange version of it imaginable."

== Charts ==
=== Weekly charts ===
Chart (1960)	Peak position:
US Bubbling Under Hot 100 Singles (Billboard)	14

Chart (2011)	Peak position:
Scottish Singles Sales (Official Charts)	3
UK Singles (Official Charts)	3
UK Indie (Official Charts)	1

Chart (2014)	Peak position:
US Holiday Digital Songs (Billboard)	23
US Holiday 100 (Billboard)	69

=== Year-end charts ===
Chart (2011)	Position
UK Singles (OCC)	178

== Certifications ==
Region	Certification	Certified units/sales
United Kingdom (BPI)	Silver	200,000^{‡}
^{‡} Sales+streaming figures based on certification alone.
