= The Philly Specials =

American musical group

- Origin: Philadelphia, Pennsylvania, US
- Genres: Christmas music
- Years active: 2022–present
- Label: Vera Y Records
- Members: Lane Johnson; Jason Kelce; Jordan Mailata
- Website: phillyspecialchristmas.com

The Philly Specials is an American musical group formed by three football players from the Philadelphia Eagles of the National Football League: offensive linemen Lane Johnson, Jason Kelce, and Jordan Mailata. They are known for recording three albums of Christmas music with the proceeds being donated to charity. The group was named for the Philly Special trick play used by the Eagles to score a touchdown in Super Bowl LII in 2018.

The Philly Specials' albums have been produced by Charlie Hall, drummer for the War on Drugs, with Philadelphia Eagles executive Connor Barwin as executive producer. Their albums have featured numerous guest performers. The Philadelphia Eagles have been represented on the albums by other players such as A. J. Brown, Jordan Davis, Nakobe Dean, Landon Dickerson, Brandon Graham, Jalen Hurts, and Haason Reddick; offensive line coach Jeff Stoutland; general manager Howie Roseman; and play-by-play announcer Merrill Reese. Among the musical artists who have appeared on the Philly Specials' albums are Eric Bazilian and Rob Hyman (of the Hooters), Patti LaBelle, Amos Lee, Stevie Nicks, and Boyz II Men.

Jason Kelce and his brother Travis Kelce of the Kansas City Chiefs performed a duet version of "Fairytale of New York", rewritten as "Fairytale of Philadelphia", on the group's second album. The song reached No. 1 on two of Billboard magazine's specialty charts, Rock Digital Song Sales and Holiday Digital Song Sales.

The group's 2024 album, A Philly Special Christmas Party, has been announced as being their last. It reached No. 1 on Billboard's Independent Albums chart, selling 32,000 copies in its first week of release, of which 22,000 copies were on vinyl. This marked the biggest sales week for any holiday album on vinyl since Nielsen SoundScan began keeping records in 1991.

== Discography ==
=== Studio albums ===
List of albums, with selected chart positions
Title	Album details	Peak chart positions	Label
Title	Album details	US	Label
A Philly Special Christmas	Released: December 22, 2022; Format: EP, CD, Digital download	80	Vera Y Records
A Philly Special Christmas Special	Released: December 1, 2023; Format: LP, CD, Digital download	25	Vera Y Records
A Philly Special Christmas Party	Released: November 22, 2024; Format: LP, CD, Digital download	16	Vera Y Records

=== Compilations ===
List of albums, with selected chart positions
Title	Album details	Peak chart positions	Label
Title	Album details	US	Label
A Philly Special Christmas Special (The Deluxe Album 2022 & 2023)	Released: 2023; Format: LP	55	Vera Y Records
