= Philly Special =

Notable American football play in Super Bowl LII

Coordinates: 44.97334°N 93.25726°W

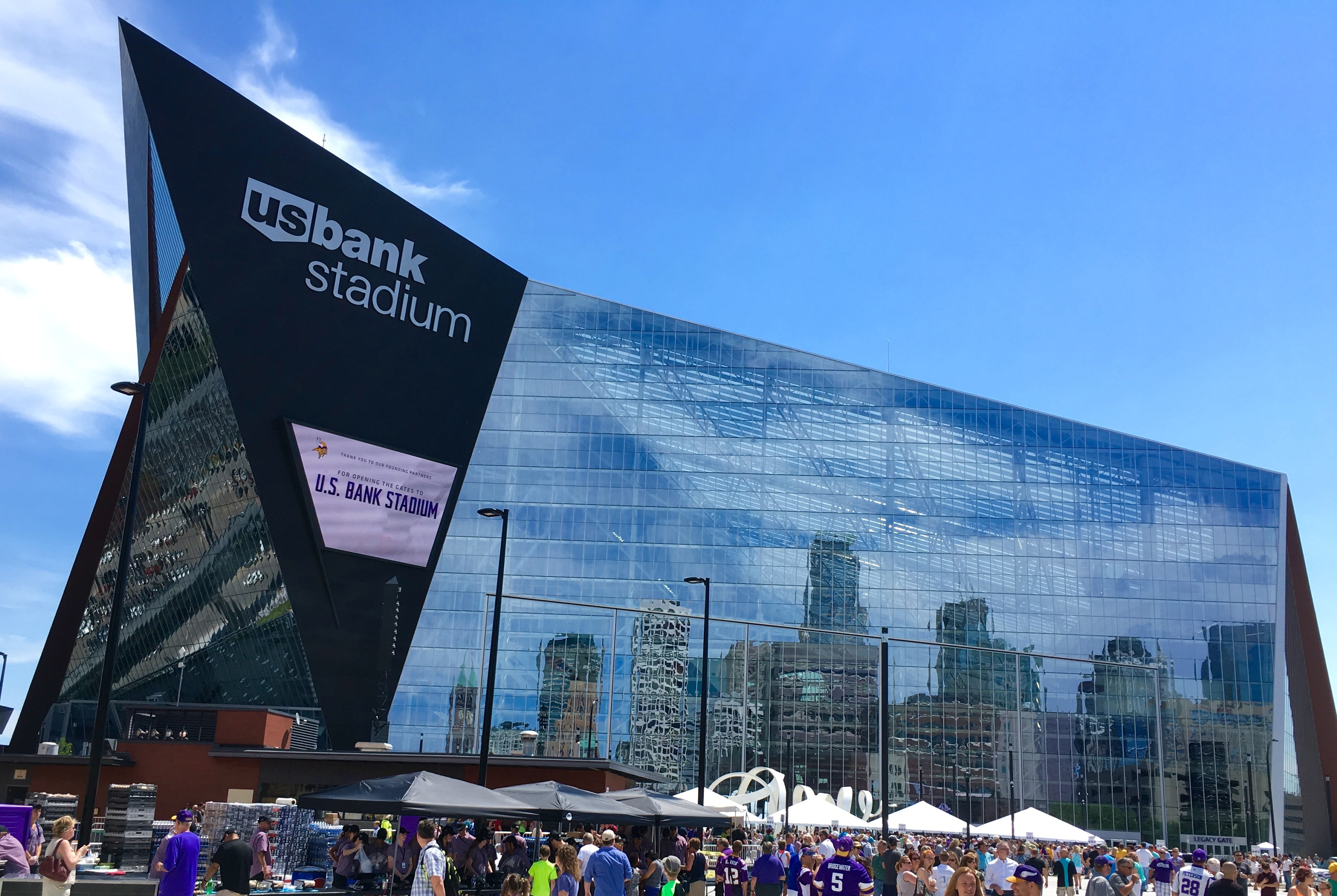
- U.S. Bank Stadium in Minneapolis, the site of the game
Philadelphia Eagles (1) (NFC) (13–3)	New England Patriots (1) (AFC) (13–3)
41	33
Head coach: Doug Pederson	Head coach: Bill Belichick
	1	2	3	4	Total
PHI	9	13	7	12	41
NE	3	9	14	7	33
- Date: February 4, 2018
- Stadium: U.S. Bank Stadium; Minneapolis, Minnesota
- Favorite: Patriots by 5
- Referee: Gene Steratore
- Attendance: 67,612

TV in the United States
- Network: NBC
- Announcers: Al Michaels, Cris Collinsworth, and Michele Tafoya

The Philly Special, also known as Philly Philly, was an American football trick play between Philadelphia Eagles players Corey Clement, Trey Burton, and Nick Foles on fourth-down-and-goal toward the end of the second quarter of Super Bowl LII on February 4, 2018 at U.S. Bank Stadium in Minneapolis.

On the play, quarterback Nick Foles moved up behind his offensive line, and Jason Kelce snapped the ball directly to running back Corey Clement. Clement pitched the ball to Trey Burton who passed it to a wide open Foles for a touchdown. Foles became the first player in Super Bowl history to throw and catch a touchdown pass during a Super Bowl game.

Eagles coach Doug Pederson's decision to attempt a touchdown rather than a field goal on the play helped put the Eagles in a better position to defeat the New England Patriots, which they did, 41–33. The victory was the Eagles' first championship in 57 years. Many analysts have since called the play one of the gutsiest play-calls in Super Bowl history.

The play was described by NFL Films as "a play that the Eagles had never called before, run on 4th down by an undrafted rookie running back pitching the football to a third-string tight end who had never attempted an NFL pass before, throwing to a backup quarterback who had never caught an NFL (or college) pass before, on the biggest stage for football," whilst also remarking that "there isn't a play in the playbook that illustrates what makes this Philly team special more than the Philly Special."

== Background ==
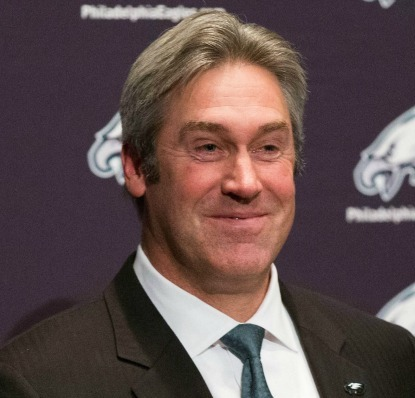
Eagles coach Doug Pederson who called the play

A play identical to the Philly Special had been successfully run at the college level on a two-point conversion attempt in 2012 by Clemson with Andre Ellington, DeAndre Hopkins and Tajh Boyd against Georgia Tech. The Patriots also pulled off a version of the Philly Special against the Eagles in 2015. Tom Brady wandered out of the pocket and the ball was snapped to James White. White then pitched the ball to Danny Amendola who connected with Brady for a 36-yard pass. In 2016, the play was run in the NFL by the Chicago Bears against the Minnesota Vikings, at U.S. Bank Stadium, the same stadium in which the Philly Special also took place. Like Clemson, the Bears' attempt, led by Matt Barkley, Jeremy Langford and Cameron Meredith, was a success as they scored a touchdown on the play. Eagles receiver Alshon Jeffery, who was a member of the Bears at the time, stated his team's wide receivers coach Mike Groh, a former Bears coach in the same position, introduced the play to Doug Pederson. During the Detroit Lions Week 17 game against the Green Bay Packers, the Lions ran a nearly identical play to the Philly Special on a two point conversion late in the game. Ameer Abdullah took a direct snap, reversed to Golden Tate, who completed a pass to Matthew Stafford for a successful conversion. Eagles offensive coordinator Frank Reich considered running the play against the Vikings in the NFC Championship Game before Super Bowl LII, but relented due to the lopsided score.

Nick Foles had played as a tight end in high school during his sophomore year. After the Super Bowl, he stated that the last time he had caught a pass for a touchdown was when he was in high school. Trey Burton, at his high school, had been a first team all-state quarterback during his junior and senior years. During his freshman year at the University of Florida, he scored six touchdowns in a single game, breaking the team record set by Tim Tebow.

Foles' experience as quarterback and tight end was at Westlake High near Austin, Texas. Sam Ehlinger, who went on to start as quarterback at the University of Texas, also played at Westlake and ran this same play during his junior year on November 28, 2015. Soon after the Super Bowl, Ehlinger tweeted a video of his high school touchdown catch, saying "It's a Westlake thing."

== Super Bowl LII game action prior to the play ==
During the second quarter, the Patriots had attempted a trick play with quarterback Tom Brady running a pattern as a receiver. The ball was thrown on target by Danny Amendola, but it slipped through Brady's hands. The drive ended after the next play with the Eagles taking possession.

During Philadelphia's drive previous to their attempt at a trick play at the end of the second quarter, Nick Foles's pass was intercepted by Patriots defensive back Duron Harmon. The Patriots, led by Tom Brady, drove down the field and scored on a James White 26 yard touchdown run to cut the Eagles lead to 3. After a Kenjon Barner kick return to the 30 yard line and two plays for 7 yards, the Eagles were faced with 3rd and 3. Nick Foles was able to find Corey Clement on a wheel route for 55 yards, which set up first-and-goal, but the Eagles' drive stalled, which brought up fourth-and-goal on the Patriots' 1-yard line. Foles and the Eagles were lining up to run a fourth-down play before Pederson called for a timeout (Philadelphia's first timeout).

When Foles and Pederson met during the timeout, Foles suggested to use the Philly Special, which Pederson then gave his approval.

== The play ==
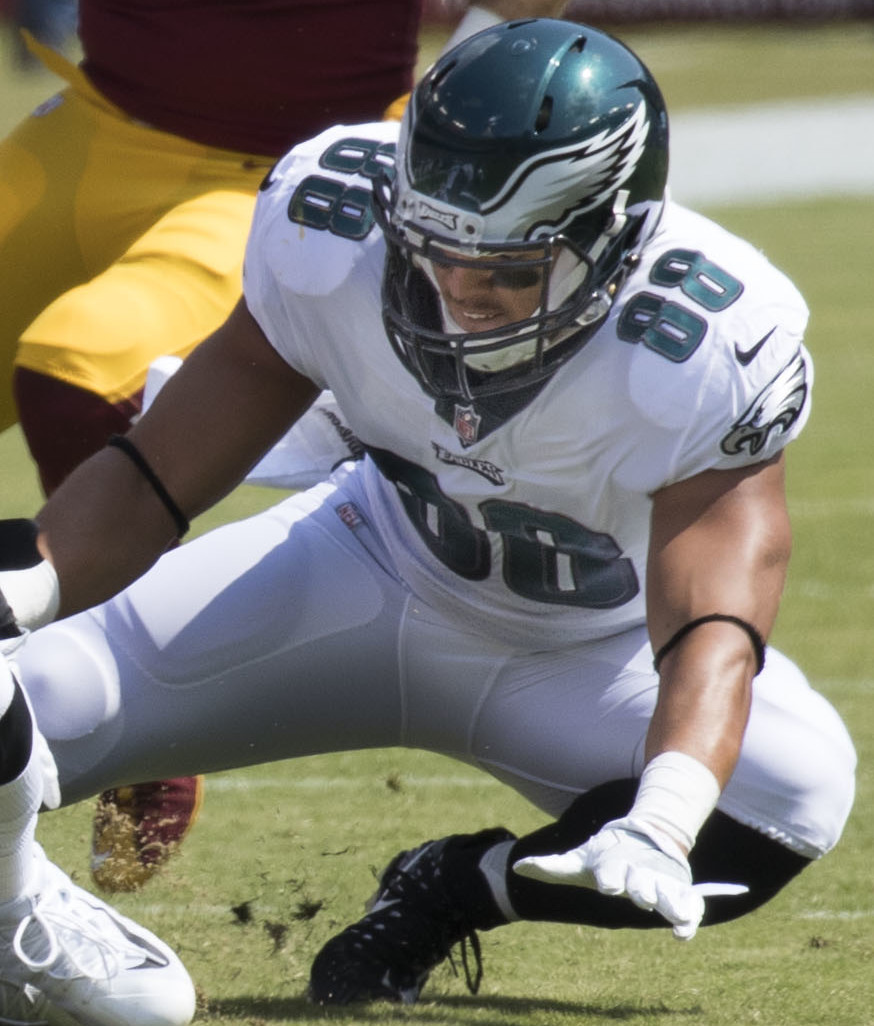
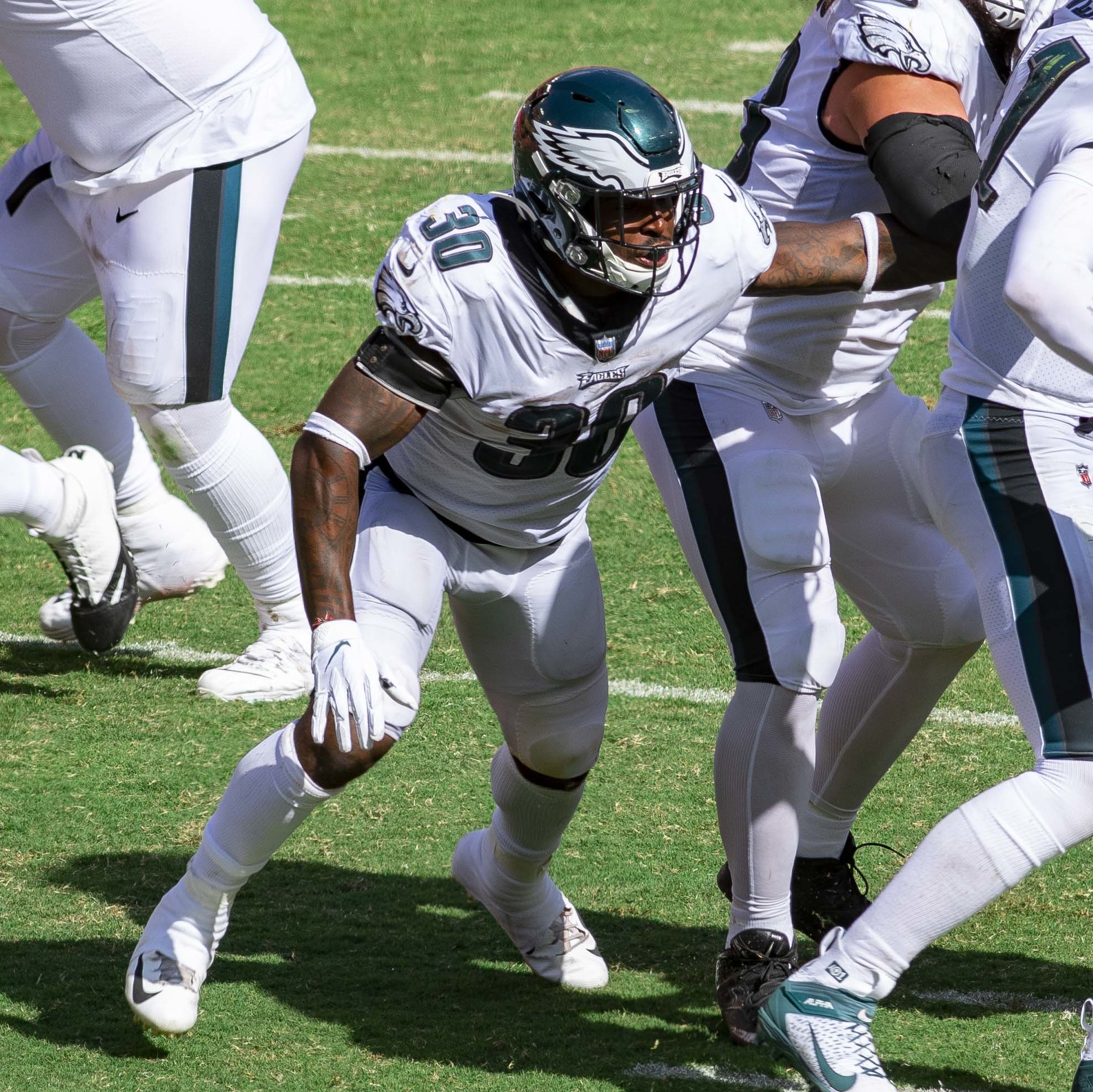
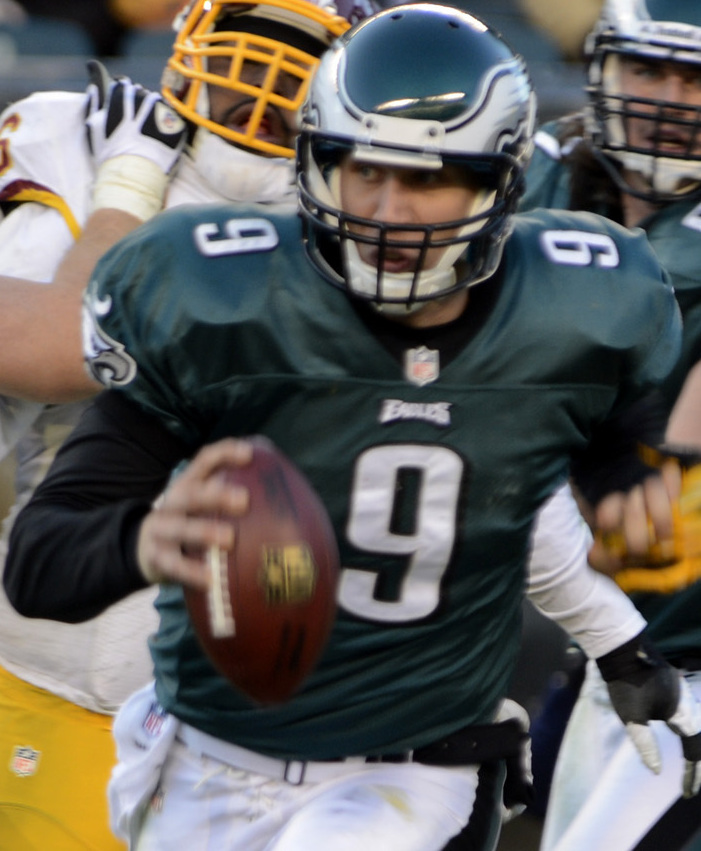
Trey Burton, Corey Clement, and Nick Foles, the ball handlers in the play

During Super Bowl LII against the New England Patriots, as Foles walked up from the shotgun to line up behind tackle Lane Johnson on the right side of the formation, he gave a wing-flapping gesture to signal and rally his teammates but moved up to the right side of the offensive line behind right tackle Lane Johnson. Foles then stayed on the right side of the offensive line and the ball was snapped to running back Corey Clement. Clement then ran left and flipped the ball to Trey Burton, to complete a reverse to the right side of the field. Finally, Burton threw the ball to Foles, who ran a route to the right corner of the end zone and made the catch for a Philadelphia touchdown. After the extra-point was successfully kicked by Jake Elliott, the Eagles went up 22–12, maintaining the score into halftime.

=== Legality ===
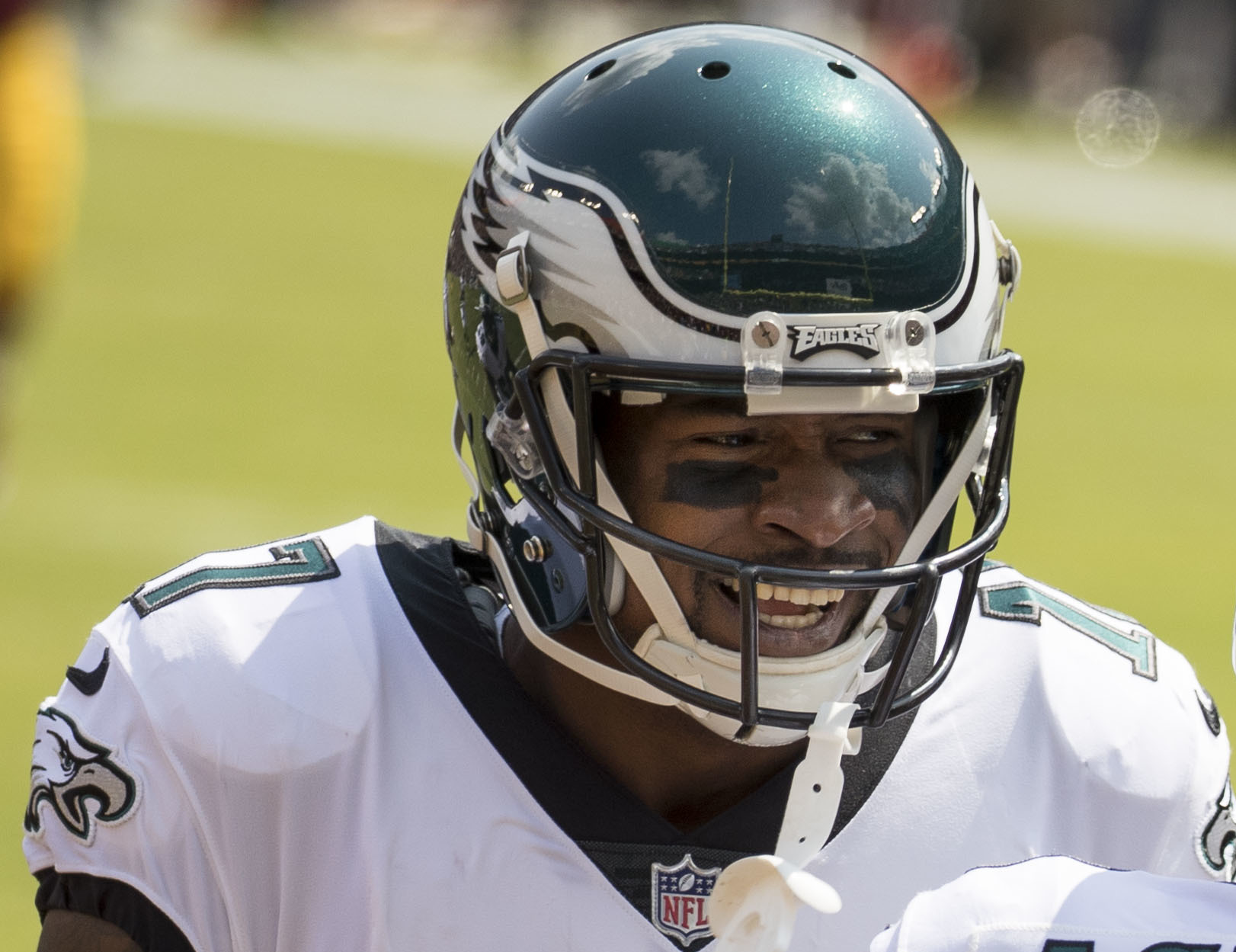
Alshon Jeffery with the Eagles during the 2017 regular season

Following the play, some questioned if it was legal. The NFL rule states that the "offensive team must have at least seven players on line" and defines that a non-snapper player is on the line if his helmet "break[s] a vertical plane that passes through the beltline of the snapper." However, they argued that Eagles' wide receiver Alshon Jeffery was slightly off the line of scrimmage. Therefore, some argued that the Eagles had only six players on the line instead of the required seven. Fox Sports rules expert and former NFL referee Mike Pereira even said "...They lined up wrong ... Not only that, [but] it's a trick play. And if you're going to run a trick-type play, then you have to be lined up properly ... It's kind of one of those [penalties] that has no effect on the play. I get it. But they didn't line up properly. And it really should've been called." However, before the snap, Jeffery pointed to the down judge several times to confirm he lined up correctly and got a head nod in return each time, indicating he was properly aligned. This practice is typical at all levels of the sport for confirming proper alignment.

== Broadcasting calls ==
Before the play was called, NBC broadcaster Cris Collinsworth expressed his shock on-air that the Eagles would go for it, as he said, "This is an unbelievable call ... This is like going for an onside kick. This could decide the game." He then noticed the alignment just prior to the snap, and uttered, "Uh-oh," quietly.

=== Television ===
Al Michaels made the call with Collinsworth for NBC.

4th and Goal. And they're gonna snap it, and it's Trey Burton who throws, caught! Foles, touchdown! How do you figure? They go to the very, very, very back of the playbook for the touchdown!

— Al Michaels

=== Radio ===
Eagles broadcasters Merrill Reese and Mike Quick made the call for 94.1 WIP, the team's flagship station.

Foles in the gun. Clement to his right. Now lines up behind Foles. Foles moves to the right and it goes directly to Clement and Clement reverses it and it goes into the end zone ... AND IT'S A TOUCHDOWN BY NICK FOLES.

— Merrill Reese

== Aftermath ==
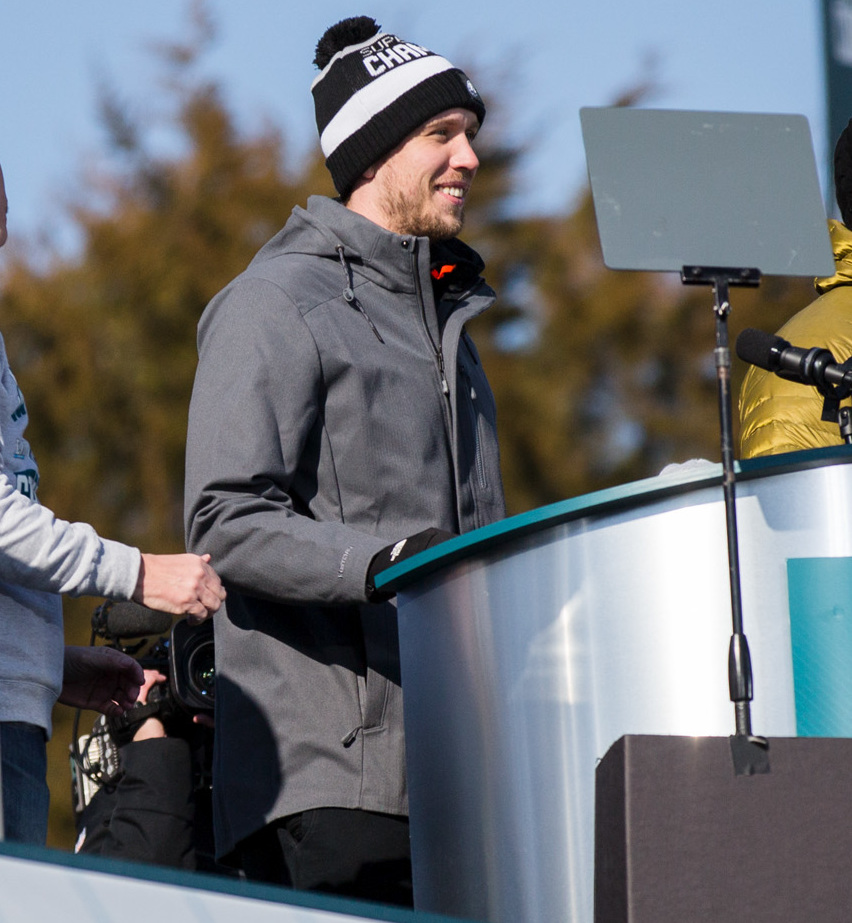
Nick Foles addressing crowds at the Super Bowl LII victory parade in Center City Philadelphia

The Eagles went on to win Super Bowl LII, 41–33. It was the team's first NFL championship since 1960, and first ever Super Bowl win.

After the game, coach Doug Pederson told reporters, "We call [the play] the Philly special." Pederson also noted that the play came from "[looking] at different plays around the league and the collegiate ranks, and things that over the years that might fit what we do. We found this one that fit, and we've been working on it for the last couple of weeks and tonight was the night."

Two days after the game, Showtime's Inside the NFL released footage with audio between Coach Doug Pederson and Nick Foles. It showed Foles suggesting the Philly Special, saying "You want Philly Philly?", and Pederson responding, after a thoughtful pause, by saying "Yeah, let's do it."

On February 20, ESPN's Darren Rovell announced that the Philadelphia Eagles had filed for a trademark for the term "Philly Special." Seven other groups, including Yuengling, also filed for the trademark. Yuengling later retracted their file for the trademark. The Eagles successfully secured a trademark registration for the term on October 5, 2021. The team uses the term for apparel and other paraphernalia.

At the 2018 NFL owners meetings in Houston Texas, Pederson said that the play is being unofficially retired for at least one season due to other teams' awareness of the play.

On June 14, 2018, the Eagles received their Super Bowl rings. The bezel of the ring contained 127 diamonds, which is the total from the numbers of the jerseys of the three players who handled the ball after the snap on the Philly Special—Corey Clement (30), Trey Burton (88) and Nick Foles (9).

In September 2018, a statue commemorating the Philly Special, showing the moment of discussion between Nick Foles and Doug Pederson, was unveiled at Lincoln Financial Field. The statue was commissioned by Bud Light and sculpted by Raymond Gibby.

In 2022, Eagles' offensive linemen Lane Johnson, Jason Kelce and Jordan Mailata released a Christmas album named A Philly Special Christmas. The album's name is inspired by the Philly Special. The trio released a second Christmas album in 2023, called A Philly Special Christmas Special.

=== Similar plays ===
==== NFL ====
On September 6, 2018, during the first game of the 2018 season, the Eagles ran a similar trick play against the Atlanta Falcons successfully, gaining a first down. Despite the Philly Special being occasionally called "Philly Philly" due to the conversation Foles and Pederson had regarding calling that play, Pederson indicated the play in the Falcons–Eagles game is called "Philly Philly."

On September 20, 2018, the Cleveland Browns ran the play successfully for a two-point conversion against the New York Jets. Running back Duke Johnson took the snap and handed the ball off to wide receiver Jarvis Landry, who threw a pass to quarterback Baker Mayfield. As Landry is left-handed, the play was run to the left side of the field, rather than the right side. This play has earned nicknames "Baker Special" after Mayfield, "Cleveland Special," and the "Dilly Special" in reference to Bud Light's "Dilly Dilly" ad campaign. This play tied the game that the Browns went on to win, ending a 19-game winless streak. Bud Light placed "victory fridges" in several Cleveland-area taverns that unlocked upon the Browns winning.

On December 2, 2018, the Chicago Bears successfully ran the play for a touchdown against the New York Giants as time expired in the fourth quarter to tie the game and force overtime. Trey Burton, who signed with the Bears during the 2018 offseason, flipped the ball to Tarik Cohen, who threw the touchdown. However, the Giants would go on to win the game in overtime.

On October 11, 2020, the Dallas Cowboys successfully ran a very similar play to score a touchdown in their week 5 game against the New York Giants, but with a couple of key differences: The snap went to QB Dak Prescott who handed the ball off to RB Ezekiel Elliott instead of directly to Elliott, and thrower Cedrick Wilson was a Wide Receiver instead of a Tight End.

On September 19, 2021, the Eagles attempted a similar play against the San Francisco 49ers. Greg Ward, a quarterback in college, attempted to throw to Jalen Hurts, but the pass was incomplete.

On October 18th, 2021, the Buffalo Bills successfully attempted a very similar play on a two point conversion against the Tennessee Titans on Monday Night Football; quarterback Josh Allen took the snap and pitched the ball to wide receiver Isaiah McKenzie on what looked like reverse, but then McKenzie flipped the ball to Dawson Knox (who played QB in high school), who found a wide-open Allen in the end zone. Play-by-play announcer Steve Levy coined the play "The Buffalo Special."

On October 31st, 2021, the New York Jets successfully converted a similar play on a two point conversion in the fourth quarter against the Cincinnati Bengals in an upset win. Backup quarterback Mike White, filling in for the injured Zach Wilson, took the snap in shotgun and handed the ball to Michael Carter, who proceeded to pitch it back to Jamison Crowder. Crowder promptly threw the ball to White, who was waiting on the right side of the end zone for the successful conversion. That attempt ended up being the final scoring play of the game, and the Jets ended up winning 34-31. White, who threw for 405 yards, was named the AFC Offensive Player of the Week.

In Super Bowl LVI, the Cincinnati Bengals ran a trick-play where running back Joe Mixon threw a touchdown to wide receiver Tee Higgins. Mixon was the first non-quarterback to throw a touchdown in the Super Bowl since Burton. The Los Angeles Rams tried to run a similar trick play to the Philly Special later in the game. Rams quarterback Matthew Stafford handed off the ball to running back Darrell Henderson, who flipped the ball to wide receiver Cooper Kupp, but Kupp overthrew an open Stafford.

On October 2, 2022 the New York Jets successfully ran a similar play for a touchdown against the Pittsburgh Steelers. Wide receiver Braxton Berrios took the handoff on a reverse and rolling to his right. He then threw a touchdown pass to quarterback Zach Wilson, who was wide open in the end zone.

On September 30, 2024, the Detroit Lions pulled off the play against the Seattle Seahawks. Quarterback Jared Goff tossed the ball backwards to wide receiver Amon-Ra St. Brown, who lobbed a high ball back to Goff, who was found in the end zone, while a defender was scrambling after Goff.

==== AAF ====
Steve Spurrier called the "Orlando Special" during the inaugural game of the Alliance of American Football; it was a success, propelling the Orlando Apollos to a 40–6 win over the Atlanta Legends.

==== NCAA ====
On September 21, 2019, the Pittsburgh Panthers college football team called the "Pitt Special" during a matchup against the then-unbeaten UCF Knights, leading the Panthers to a 35–34 victory over the Knights.

The North Carolina Tar Heels ran an adaptation of the play on two occasions, first in the 2019 Military Bowl against Temple, and secondly against Miami in the final game of the 2020 regular season. The Tar Heels' variation was run from under center, with wide receiver Rontavius "Toe" Groves throwing the pass to quarterback Sam Howell both times. Both instances resulted in touchdowns.

On September 11, 2021, Notre Dame tried to execute a Philly Special against Toledo, but quarterback Jack Coan was covered on the play. Avery Davis instead improvised, finding running back Kyren Williams for a successful two-point conversion.

On September 18, 2021, San Diego State and backup quarterback Lucas Johnson successfully executed the Philly Special to defeat the Utah Utes in the third overtime.

On November 20, 2021, the Cincinnati Bearcats executed the Philly Special in the third quarter against the SMU Mustangs. The play resulted in quarterback Desmond Ridder's first collegiate touchdown reception.
