= A Philly Special Christmas Special =

2023 Christmas album

Studio album by The Philly Specials
- Released: December 1, 2023
- Recorded: May–July 2023
- Studio: Elm Street Studio in Conshohocken, Pennsylvania
- Genre: Christmas music
- Length: 39:16
- Label: Vera Y Records
- Producer: Charlie Hall

The Philly Specials chronology
A Philly Special Christmas (2022)	A Philly Special Christmas Special (2023)	A Philly Special Christmas Party (2024)

Singles from A Philly Special Christmas Special
- 1. "All I Want For Christmas Is You" Released: November 3, 2023; 2. "This Christmas" Released: November 10, 2023; 3. "Fairytale of Philadelphia" Released: November 15, 2023

A Philly Special Christmas Special is the second studio album released by The Philly Specials, a vocal trio composed of Philadelphia Eagles offensive linemen Lane Johnson, Jason Kelce, and Jordan Mailata. A sequel to A Philly Special Christmas, the album consists of covers of classic Christmas songs, and was released by Vera Y Records on December 1, 2023. It features appearances by Amos Lee, Patti LaBelle, The Philly Special Children's Choir, Waxahatchee, Howie Roseman, Jordan Davis, Travis Kelce, and The Silver Ages. Proceeds from the album are donated to the Children's Crisis Treatment Center and Children's Hospital of Philadelphia. The album raised more than $3 million.

== Production ==
The album was recorded at Elm Street Studios in Conshohocken, Pennsylvania, between May and July 2023. The album artwork was designed by Hannah Westerman, based on Charles M. Schulz's Peanuts comic strip.

== Promotion ==
On November 23, an animated stop motion video was released, featuring the singers "attempting to rally their friends together for a holiday performance", and includes snippets of songs from the album.

== Release ==
The album was released on December 1, 2023, and was available through digital download and vinyl. A double album named A Philly Special Christmas Special (The Deluxe Album 2022 & 2023), which combined A Philly Special Christmas Special with its prequel A Philly Special Christmas, was also made available on vinyl only.

== Commercial performance ==
The album sold 28,000 copies in the US in its first week, with nearly 17,500 sold on vinyl. It debuted on the Billboard 200 chart at No. 25. The deluxe album sold nearly 20,000 copies and debuted at No. 55 on the Billboard 200.

== Track listing ==
A Philly Special Christmas Special track listing
No.	Title	Writer(s)	Producer(s)	Length
1.	"The Christmas Song" (featuring Amos Lee)	Mel Tormé; Robert Wells	Charlie Hall; Connor Barwin	3:26
2.	"This Christmas" (The Philly Specials, Jordan Mailata, featuring Patti LaBelle)	Donny Hathaway; Nadine Theresa McKinnon	Hall; Barwin	3:11
3.	"Dominick the Donkey" (featuring Jason Kelce)	Ray Allen; Wandra Merrell; Sam Saltzberg	Hall; Barwin	2:47
4.	"Santa's Night" (featuring Jason Kelce)	Jason Kelce	Hall; Barwin	3:05
5.	"Christmas Time Is Here" (featuring The Philly Special Children's Choir)	Vince Guaraldi; Lee Mendelson	Hall; Barwin	2:59
6.	"All I Want for Christmas Is You" (featuring Jordan Mailata)	Walter Afanasieff; Mariah Carey	Hall; Barwin	4:13
7.	"Pretty Paper" (The Philly Specials, Lane Johnson, featuring Waxahatchee)	Willie Nelson	Hall; Barwin	2:38
8.	"The Dreidel Song" (featuring Howie Roseman)	Samuel E. Goldfarb; Samuel S. Grossman	Hall; Barwin	3:46
9.	"Have Yourself a Merry Little Christmas" (featuring Jordan Davis)	Ralph Blane; Hugh Martin	Hall; Barwin	2:40
10.	"Fairytale of Philadelphia" (The Philly Specials, Jason Kelce, Travis Kelce)	Jim Finer; Shane MacGowan	Hall; Barwin	4:46
11.	"Auld Lang Syne" (The Philly Specials, The Silver Ages, featuring Jason Kelce)	Robert Burns	Hall; Barwin	5:45
Total length:				39:16

== Personnel ==
- Charlie Hall – producer
- Nick Krill – audio engineer
- Connor Barwin – executive producer
- Lane Johnson – vocals
- Jason Kelce – vocals, writer (track 4)
- Jordan Mailata – vocals

Recorded and engineered at

- Elm Street Studios, Conshohocken, Pennsylvania

Instrumentation

- Eric Bazilian
- Brandon Beaver – guitar
- Robbie Bennett
- Dan Blacksberg
- Mike Brenner – pedal steel guitar
- Matt Cappy
- Jay Davidson – harmonica
- Nasir Dickerson – saxophone
- DMHotep
- Brennen Ernst
- Justin Faulkner – drums
- Kevin Hanson – guitar
- Eliza Hardy Jones
- Thomas Hughes
- Rob Hyman
- James Lavino
- Zach Miller – piano
- Luke Carlos O'Reilly – piano
- Anthony Tidd – bass

Featured vocals

- Jordan Davis (track 9)
- Travis Kelce (track 10)
- Patti LaBelle (track 2)
- Amos Lee (track 1)
- Howie Roseman (track 8)
- The Silver Ages (track 11)
- Waxahatchee (track 7)
- Jalen Hurts, Brandon Graham, Landon Dickerson, Nakobe Dean, Jeff Stoutland (track 11)

Artwork

- Hannah Westerman
