= A Philly Special Christmas =

Christmas album

Studio album by The Philly Specials
- Released: December 23, 2022
- Recorded: July 2022
- Studios: Elm Street Studio in Conshohocken, Pennsylvania; Rittenhouse Soundwork and Silent Partners Studio in Germantown, Philadelphia
- Genre: Christmas music
- Length: 26:00
- Label: Vera Y Records
- Producer: Charlie Hall

The Philly Specials chronology
A Philly Special Christmas (2022)	A Philly Special Christmas Special (2023)

Singles from A Philly Special Christmas
- 1. "Christmas (Baby Please Come Home)" Released: November 25, 2022; 2. "Blue Christmas" Released: December 2, 2022; 3. "Merry Christmas Baby" Released: December 9, 2022; 4. "Silent Night" Released: December 16, 2022

A Philly Special Christmas is the debut studio album by The Philly Specials – a vocal trio composed of Philadelphia Eagles offensive linemen Lane Johnson, Jason Kelce, and Jordan Mailata. It was released on December 23, 2022, by Vera Y Records. The Christmas album is produced by Charlie Hall, drummer for the band The War on Drugs. Former Eagles linebacker Connor Barwin served as executive producer. Johnson, Kelce and Mailata returned to record their second studio album, A Philly Special Christmas Special, which was released on December 1, 2023.

The album consists of covers of classic Christmas songs and features duets with Eagles play-by-play announcer Merrill Reese and other players, including Jalen Hurts, A. J. Brown, Brandon Graham, Haason Reddick, and Jordan Davis. All proceeds from the album go towards the Children's Crisis Treatment Center in Philadelphia, with more than $250,000 raised.

== Background ==
Kelce said that the group of offensive linemen first considered writing the album in 2021. Both Mailata and Kelce have had a background in singing. In 2015, Kelce performed a cover of Cover Me Up by Jason Isbell and his original song Homes Change on WXPN. In 2022, Mailata appeared on the television series The Masked Singer. Mailata has been described as "evoking Frankie Valli in his singing."

Kelce and Barwin reached out to Charlie Hall, the drummer for The War on Drugs and the leader of the indie rock chorus The Silver Ages, for direction on the creation of the album. Hall stated that he first met with the offensive linemen and "wanted to suss out what they were after. Was this a goof, or was it a sincere thing? I saw right away that it’s truly sincere. They just wanted to make something that’s a love letter to Philly."

The album was recorded during summer 2022 and was finished in July, prior to the start of training camp. The title of the album is inspired by the Philly Special, a trick play run by the Eagles in Super Bowl LII, as well as A Very Special Christmas, a holiday compilation album series. The album cover is derived from the artwork of Vince Guaraldi's 1965 album A Charlie Brown Christmas, with permission from the estate of Peanuts creator Charles M. Schulz.

The Philly Specials released a music video for "White Christmas" in November 2025.

== Commercial performance ==
According to Billboard, the album sold 3,000 copies between December 1, 2022 and December 22. In the week ending December 29, the album sold 11,000 copies. It entered the Billboard 200 chart at No. 80. By September 2023, it had sold 25,000 copies on vinyl.

In December 2023, the album was released as a double album on vinyl with its sequel A Philly Special Christmas Special as A Philly Special Christmas Special (The Deluxe Album 2022 & 2023). In its first week, it sold nearly 20,000 copies and debuted at No. 55 on the Billboard 200.

== Track listing ==
A Philly Special Christmas track listing
No.	Title	Writer(s)	Producer(s)	Length
1.	"White Christmas"	Irving Berlin	Charlie Hall; Connor Barwin	3:08
2.	"Blue Christmas"	Billy Hayes; Jay W. Johnson	Hall; Barwin	2:59
3.	"Merry Christmas Baby"	Lou Baxter; Johnny Moore	Hall; Barwin	4:18
4.	"The Night Before Christmas"	Clement Clarke Moore	Hall; Barwin	3:57
5.	"Christmas (Baby Please Come Home)"	Jeff Barry; Ellie Greenwich; Phil Spector	Hall; Barwin	3:19
6.	"Silent Night"	Franz Xaver Gruber	Hall; Barwin	2:53
7.	"Santa Claus Is Coming to Town"	John Frederick Coots; Haven Gillespie	Hall; Barwin	5:26
Total length:				26:00

== Personnel ==
Production

- Producer: Charlie Hall
- Recorded, mixed and additional production: Nick Krill
- Mastered: Alex DeTurk
- Executive Producer: Connor Barwin
- Additional engineering and assistant engineer at Elm St. Studios: Brendan McGeehan
- Assistant engineer at Rittenhouse Soundworks: Mike Richelle
- Additional engineering for Lady Alma at Worship Recordings: Rob Paine
- Album artwork: Hannah Westerman at Avenue West

Recorded and engineered at

- Germantown, Philadelphia (Rittenhouse Soundworks and Silent Partners Studios)
- Conshohocken, Pennsylvania (Elm Street Studios)

Performance credits from NFL figures

- A. J. Brown – featured vocals
- Jordan Davis – featured vocals
- Brandon Graham – featured vocals
- Jalen Hurts – featured vocals
- Lane Johnson – all vocals
- Jason Kelce – all vocals
- Jordan Mailata – all vocals
- Haason Reddick – featured vocals
- Merrill Reese – featured vocals

Other performance credits

- The Silver Ages
- Marshall Allen
- Lady Alma
- Eric Bazilian
- Brandon Beaver
- Robbie Bennett
- Mike Brenner
- Dave Wayne Daniels
- Nasir Dickerson
- Heyward Howkins
- Eliza Hardy Jones
- Thomas Hughes
- Randy Huth
- Rob Hyman
- Nick Krill
- Zach Miller
- Josh Newman
- Todd Starlin
- Kaila Vandever

== Charts ==
Chart performance for A Philly Special Christmas
Chart (2023)	Peak position
US Billboard 200	80

== See also ==
- A Charlie Brown Christmas (soundtrack), a 1965 album whose cover inspired this one
