= Kylie Kelce =

American podcaster and media personality (born 1992)

- Born: Kylie Alyssa McDevitt; March 23, 1992 (age 34); Narberth, Pennsylvania, U.S.
- Education: Cabrini University
- Occupation: Podcaster
- Spouse: Jason Kelce (m. 2018)
- Children: 4

Kylie Alyssa Kelce (née McDevitt; born March 23, 1992) is an American podcaster and media personality. She is the creator and host of the podcast Not Gonna Lie, which debuted at the top of podcast charts in December 2024.

== Early life and education ==
Kylie Alyssa McDevitt was born on March 23, 1992, in Narberth, Pennsylvania. She began playing field hockey in the second grade. She experienced hip issues during her time at Lower Merion High School that required surgery, allowing her to continue playing without pain.

McDevitt attended Montgomery County Community College before transferring to Cabrini University. At Cabrini, she majored in communications and expressed an interest in pursuing a career in sports broadcasting. During her time at Cabrini, McDevitt was a member of the field hockey team, which competed at the NCAA Division III level. A four-year starter on defense, she was recognized as the Colonial States Athletic Conference (CSAC) Rookie of the Year and received All-CSAC honors four times, including three first-team selections. She graduated in 2017.

== Career ==
Kelce was head coach of the field hockey team at her alma mater, Lower Merion High School. She supports the Eagles Autism Foundation by helping to organize an annual fundraising event at Ocean Drive in Sea Isle City, New Jersey, and by making personal financial contributions. She was in Amazon's documentary Kelce, which followed her husband Jason Kelce's life during the 2022 Philadelphia Eagles season. She appeared in the film while pregnant with the couple's third child.

=== Not Gonna Lie podcast ===
Kelce started a podcast, Not Gonna Lie, in December 2024. The podcast, produced by Wave Sports + Entertainment, debuted at the top of podcast charts on platforms like Spotify and Apple TV+. The show includes weekly interviews with guests from pop culture, sports, and entertainment, as well as discussions on topics such as 2020s parenting, social media, and women in sports. Kelce announced the podcast as an opportunity to address public interest in her family and provide her perspective on various issues.

In January 2025, Kelce responded to critics of her podcast. She humorously explained how algorithms amplify engagement, noting that critics searching her name only boost her online presence. Laughing off claims her podcast is "amateur", she quipped that she has said the same herself. In September 2025, Sports Illustrated magazine included her on its list of "The 50 Most Influential Figures in Sports", under the influencer category.

== Personal life ==
In 2014, Kylie McDevitt met NFL player Jason Kelce using the dating app Tinder. They married in Philadelphia on April 14, 2018. They have four daughters: Wyatt, born in 2019, Elliotte, born in 2021, Bennett, born in 2023, and Finnley, born in 2025. She contributed vocals alongside her husband to the song "Loud Little Town" on the 2024 charity Christmas album A Philly Special Christmas Party.

In May 2024, she delivered a commencement speech at Cabrini University during the institution's final graduation ceremony. In her speech, she reflected on her experiences as a parent and Cabrini alumna. The following December, Kelce described herself as a Democrat whose views "aggressively lean" to the left.
