= Howie Roseman =

American football executive (born 1975)

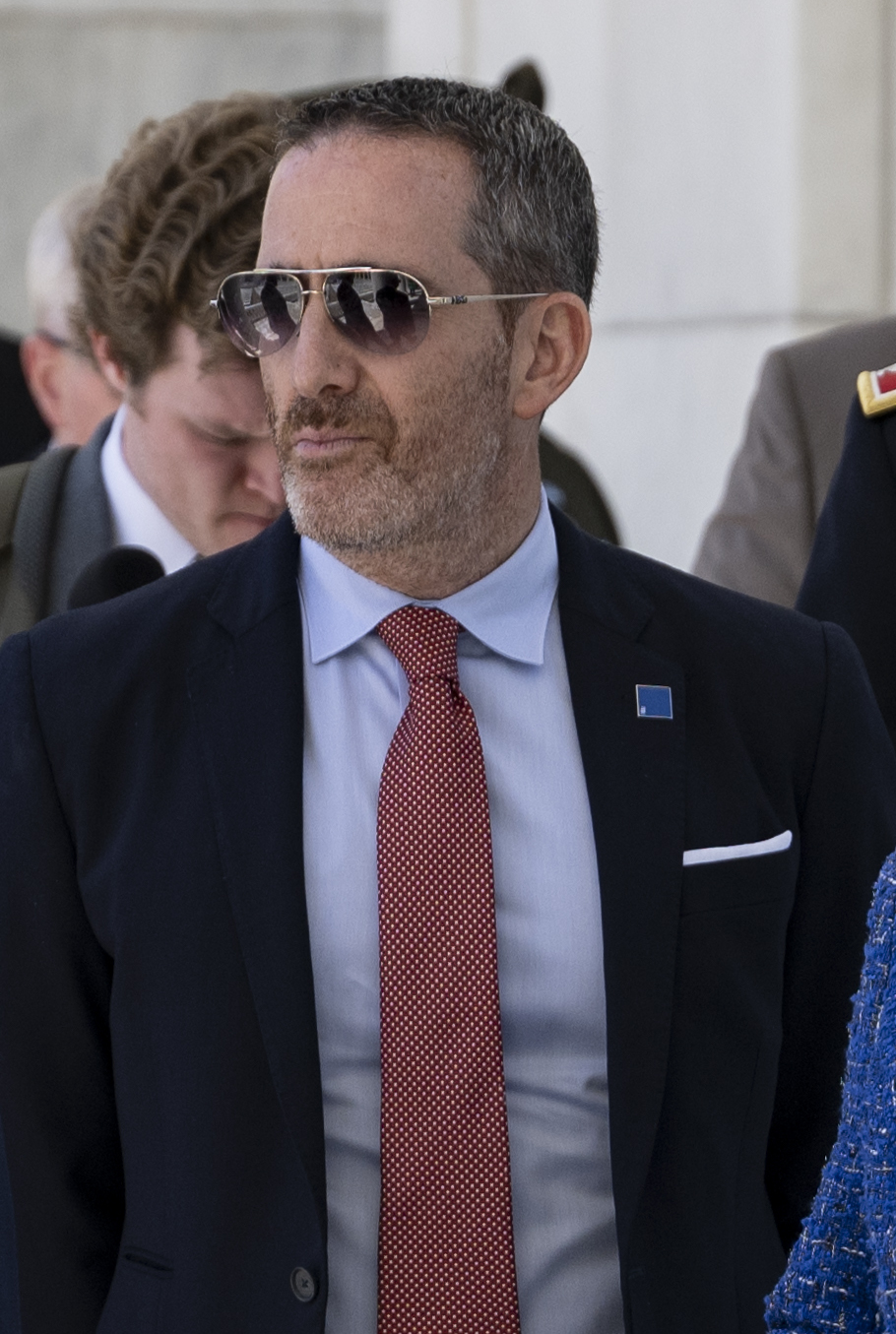
- Roseman in 2025

Philadelphia Eagles
- Title: Executive vice president, General manager

Personal information
- Born: June 23, 1975 (age 51); Brooklyn, New York, U.S.

Career information
- High school: Marlboro
- College: Florida; Fordham Law School

Career history
- Philadelphia Eagles (2000–present); Front office intern (2000); Salary cap staff counsel (2001–2002); Director of football administration (2003–2005); Vice president of football administration (2006–2007); Vice president of player personnel (2008–2009); General manager (2010–2014); Executive vice president of football operations (2015); Executive vice president/de facto general manager (2016–2018); Executive vice president/general manager (2019–present)

Awards and highlights
- 2× Super Bowl champion (LII, LIX); 2× PFWA Executive of the Year (2017, 2022)
- Executive profile at Pro Football Reference

Howard Roseman (born June 23, 1975) is an American professional football executive who is the executive vice president and general manager for the Philadelphia Eagles of the National Football League (NFL). He was hired by the team in 2000 and served in various administrative and executive roles before being promoted to general manager in 2010 and executive vice president of football operations in 2015.

Roseman's current tenure as both the team's executive vice president and general manager has been regarded among the most successful in the entire NFL during that span. Since taking on both roles in 2016, the Eagles have qualified for the postseason in eight of ten seasons, and have won five NFC East titles, three NFC championships, and two Super Bowls (LII and LIX). He was named Executive of the Year by the Pro Football Writers of America in 2017 and 2022.

== Early life ==
Roseman was born in Brooklyn, New York City on June 23, 1975, and is Jewish. He grew up in Marlboro Township, New Jersey, and later graduated from Marlboro High School.

Roseman began sending letters to every NFL team while he was still in high school. His persistence increased while he was an undergraduate at the University of Florida and throughout his time at Fordham University School of Law. His job inquiries led him to connect with Mike Tannenbaum, then the pro personnel director of the New York Jets. Tannenbaum interviewed Roseman for a player personnel intern position in 1999, but he did not get the job.

== Professional career ==
After another pursuit, Roseman was hired by the Philadelphia Eagles as an intern to work on salary cap issues in 2000. He was promoted to director of football administration in 2003 and was later promoted to vice president of football administration in 2006. Roseman continued to climb the Eagles front office ladder, serving as the vice president of player personnel for two years before being named the Eagles general manager on January 29, 2010 after Tom Heckert was hired by the Cleveland Browns in the same role. Although he had the title of general manager, Roseman served mainly in an advisory role to head coach and executive vice president of football operations Andy Reid, who had the final say in football matters.

Within his first season as general manager, Roseman went to work on the Eagles’ roster, building it into one of the youngest in the league. That revamped Eagles squad earned an NFC East division championship in 2010.

Three years later, Roseman assisted Eagles chairman Jeffrey Lurie in the team's search for a new head coach in 2013, which ended with University of Oregon coach Chip Kelly coming to Philadelphia. Kelly, like Reid, had the final say over the 53-man roster, so Roseman continued to serve mainly in an advisory role.

In their first season together in Philadelphia, Roseman and Kelly oversaw an Eagles team that won 10 games and a division championship, in a considerable turnaround from the team's 4–12 record in 2012.

Among Roseman's responsibilities as the general manager, he oversaw the Eagles’ college and pro scouting departments, the team's medical, equipment, and video staffs, while also controlling the team's salary cap and supervising team security.

In a change of front office structure, on January 2, 2015, Kelly was given general manager duties while Roseman was promoted to executive vice president of football operations. In this role, Roseman continued directing contract negotiations, managing the team's salary and also overseeing the team's medical staff, equipment staff and more. After Kelly's dismissal, Roseman became the de facto general manager again in 2016, and hired Doug Pederson as the Eagles' new head coach. Roseman helped the Eagles win Super Bowl LII when the team defeated the New England Patriots 41–33 in 2018. He was promoted to executive vice president and general manager on June 13, 2019. He won a second Super Bowl championship when the Eagles defeated the Kansas City Chiefs 40–22 in Super Bowl LIX.

Roseman also plays a large role in the Eagles' community efforts, contributing to a number of initiatives involving military and children. Roseman's charitable endeavors have benefited Eagles Youth Partnership, the team's public charity which serves over 50,000 low-income children in the Greater Philadelphia region every year with a focus on health and education programming, as well as Eagles Care. In addition, Roseman has also worked with Alex's Lemonade Stand Foundation, the Boys & Girls Clubs of America, USA Football, Pop Warner, and Cop Wheels.

== Personal life ==
Roseman earned his bachelor's degree from the University of Florida before earning a JD degree from Fordham Law School. He was roommates and fraternity brothers with Jedd Fisch during their time at Florida. Howie and his wife, Mindy, reside in the Philadelphia suburbs with their four children. Roseman is a featured artist on "The Dreidel Song" as covered by The Philly Specials, a vocal trio composed of Philadelphia Eagles offensive linemen Lane Johnson, Jason Kelce, and Jordan Mailata, on their second album A Philly Special Christmas Special. Proceeds from the album were donated to the Children's Crisis Treatment Center and Children's Hospital of Philadelphia.
