= A Philly Special Christmas Party =

2024 Christmas album

Studio album by The Philly Specials
- Released: November 22, 2024
- Genre: Christmas music
- Length: 42:45
- Label: Vera Y Records
- Producer: Charlie Hall

The Philly Specials chronology
A Philly Special Christmas Special (2023)	A Philly Special Christmas Party (2024)

Singles from A Philly Special Christmas Party
- 1. "It's Christmas Time (In Cleveland Heights)" Released: November 1, 2024; 2. "Loud Little Town" Released: November 27, 2024

A Philly Special Christmas Party is the third and final studio album from The Philly Specials, a vocal trio composed of Philadelphia Eagles offensive linemen Lane Johnson, Jason Kelce, and Jordan Mailata. The album was released on November 22, 2024, by Vera Y Records. Proceeds from the album funded an initiative to gift every student in the Philadelphia public school system a present. The album featured appearances by Stevie Nicks, Boyz II Men, Travis Kelce, Kylie Kelce, Devon Gilfillian, Immanuel Wilkins, and Mt. Joy.

== Commercial performance ==
The album debuted at No. 16 on the Billboard 200.

== Track listing ==
A Philly Special Christmas Party track listing
No.	Title	Writer(s)	Producer(s)	Length
1.	"Last Christmas"	George Michael	Charlie Hall	6:07
2.	"Rudolph the Red-Nosed Reindeer"	Johnny Marks	Hall	3:17
3.	"Having a Party" (featuring Devon Gilfillian)	Sam Cooke	Hall	4:11
4.	"It's Christmas Don't Be Late"	Ross Bagdasarian	Hall	3:06
5.	"Feliz Navidad"	José Feliciano	Hall	3:27
6.	"Maybe This Christmas" (featuring Stevie Nicks)	Ron Sexsmith	Hall	2:13
7.	"It's Christmas Time (In Cleveland Heights)" (featuring Boyz II Men and Travis Kelce)	Zach Miller	Hall	4:04
8.	"Loud Little Town" (featuring Kylie Kelce)	Brandon Beaver	Hall	3:30
9.	"Please Come Home for Christmas"	Charles Brown; Gene Redd	Hall	3:44
10.	"Sleigh Ride" (featuring Immanuel Wilkins)	Mitchell Parish; Leroy Anderson	Hall	3:00
11.	"Santa Drives an Astrovan" (featuring Mt. Joy)	Matt Quinn; Sam Cooper	Hall; Caleb Nelson	3:37
12.	"Parting Glass"		Hall	2:29
Total length:				42:45
