= Connor Barwin =

American football player (born 1986)

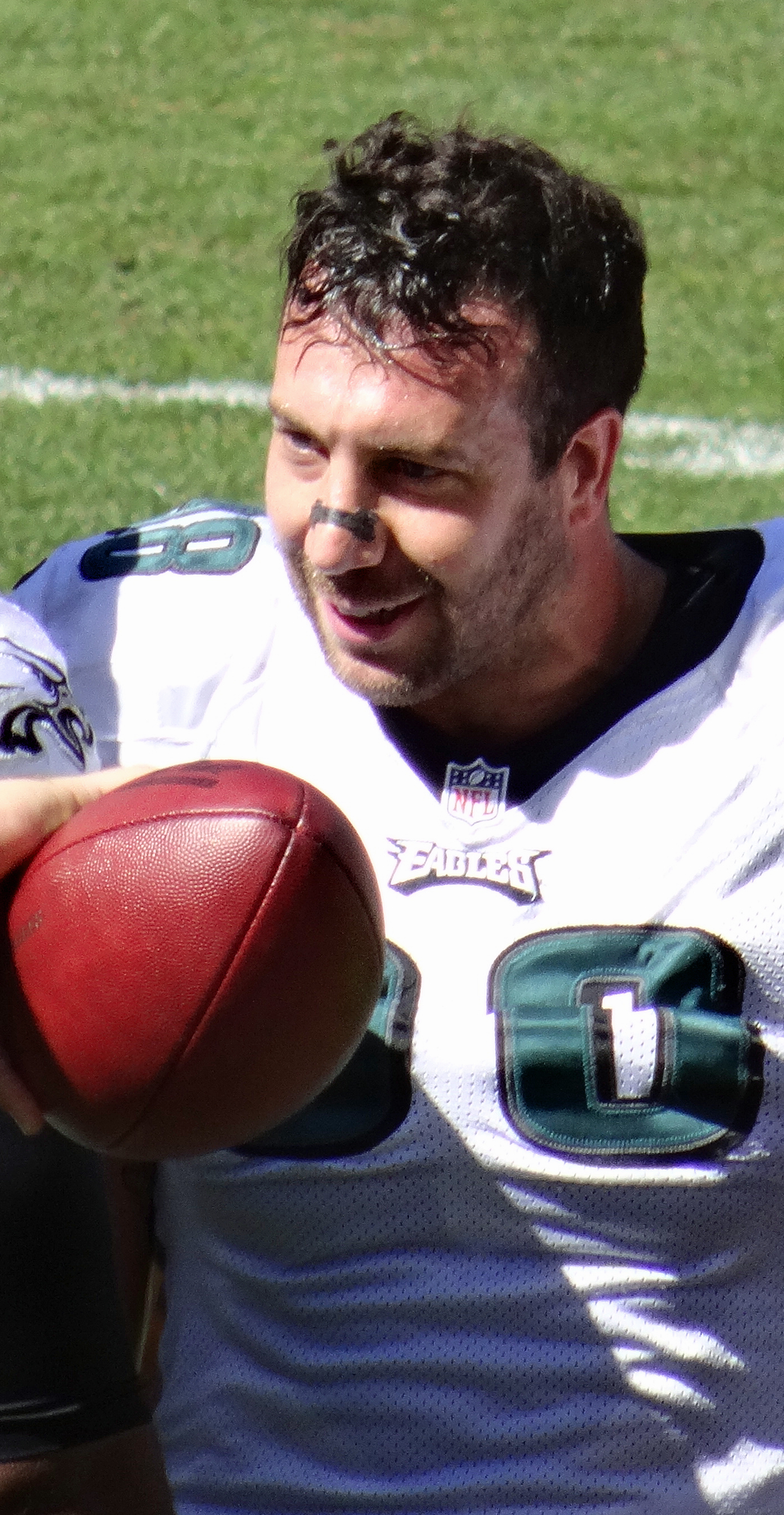
- Barwin with the Philadelphia Eagles in 2013

Philadelphia Eagles
- Title: Head of football development and strategy

Personal information
- Born: October 15, 1986 (age 40); Hazel Park, Michigan, U.S.
- Listed height: 6 ft 4 in (1.93 m)
- Listed weight: 255 lb (116 kg)

Career information
- Positions: Defensive end, Outside linebacker (No. 98, 53)
- High school: Jesuit (Detroit, Michigan)
- College: Cincinnati (2005–2008)
- NFL draft: 2009: 2nd round, 46th overall pick

Career history

Playing
- Houston Texans (2009–2012); Philadelphia Eagles (2013–2016); Los Angeles Rams (2017); New York Giants (2018)

Operations
- Philadelphia Eagles (2020–present); Special assistant to the general manager (2020–2021); Director of player development (2022–2023); Head of football development and strategy (2024–present)

Awards and highlights
- As a player: Second-team All-Pro (2014); Pro Bowl (2014); First-team All-Big East (2008); As an executive: Super Bowl champion (LIX)

Career NFL statistics
- Total tackles: 366
- Sacks: 56.5
- Forced fumbles: 6
- Pass deflections: 43
- Interceptions: 1
- Stats at Pro Football Reference

Connor Alfred Barwin (born October 15, 1986) is an American professional football executive and former player who is the head of football development and strategy for the Philadelphia Eagles of the National Football League (NFL). He played in the NFL as a defensive end in a 4–3 defensive scheme and outside linebacker in a 3–4 defense. Barwin played college football for the Cincinnati Bearcats, and was selected by the Houston Texans in the second round of the 2009 NFL draft. He also played for the Eagles, Los Angeles Rams, and New York Giants.

== Early life ==
Barwin is the youngest of four sons of Thomas Barwin and Margaret Bailey and was born in Hazel Park, Michigan. His favorite team growing up were the Detroit Lions, with his favorite player being running back Barry Sanders.

Barwin was born deaf, which was not confirmed until he was two years old. While his right ear was curable with surgery and tubes, treatment of his left ear was complicated by a benign tumor near the ossicles. As an adult, he has complete hearing in his right ear but only "10–15 percent" hearing in his left ear.

Barwin attended the University of Detroit Jesuit High School. As a senior, he was an All-state selection and earned All-League, All-Catholic, and All-District honors. He was also an All-League selection in basketball as a junior and All-Catholic as a senior.

== College career ==
Barwin attended and played college football at the University of Cincinnati, where he was a history major. As a freshman in 2005, Barwin played in all 11 games as a backup tight end, finishing with eight receptions for 144 yards and one touchdown. The starting tight end during Barwin's freshman and sophomore seasons was Brent Celek.

In early January, after injuries had decimated the Cincinnati basketball team, he joined the team, playing in 18 games as a backup forward and averaging 9.9 minutes per game. That season, he tallied highs of nine rebounds against South Carolina and six points against Pittsburgh.

As a sophomore in 2006, Barwin played in all 13 Bearcats football games as a regular on special teams and as a backup tight end. He totaled 13 receptions for 148 yards and two touchdowns. He also played in 22 games for the basketball team, with highs of five rebounds vs. DePaul and four points each against Providence and Villanova. As a junior in 2007, Barwin played special teams, as well as a starting tight end, playing in 12 games. He caught 31 passes for 399 yards and two touchdowns.

In 2008, Barwin was moved to defensive end after head coach, Brian Kelly, felt he had more potential at that position in the NFL. He finished the season with 53 tackles, and a Big East and team-leading 12 sacks. He also had 20 quarterback pressures, eight pass deflections, three fumble recoveries, and three blocked kicks. His play helped him earn First-team All-Big East honors and honorable mention All-America, as well as the Claude Rost Award, given to the team's Most Valuable Player.

Barwin finished his college career with 16 starts in 51 games (14 at defensive end, one at tight end, one at H-Back) recording 66 tackles, 12 sacks, three fumble recoveries, eight deflected passes, five blocked kicks, and 53 receptions for 692 yards and six touchdowns.

== Professional career ==
=== Pre-draft ===
Pre-draft measurables
Height	Weight	Arm length	Hand span	40-yard dash	10-yard split	20-yard split	20-yard shuttle	Three-cone drill	Vertical jump	Broad jump	Bench press	Wonderlic
6 ft 3 5/8 in (1.92 m)	256 lb (116 kg)	33 3/4 in (0.86 m)	10 in (0.25 m)	4.47 s	1.53 s	2.58 s	4.18 s	6.87 s	40.5 in (1.03 m)	10 ft 8 in (3.25 m)	23 reps	23
All values from NFL Combine/Cincinnati Bearcats Pro Day

Barwin ran a 4.47-second 40-time at his Pro Day, according to the University of Cincinnati's timer.

=== Houston Texans ===
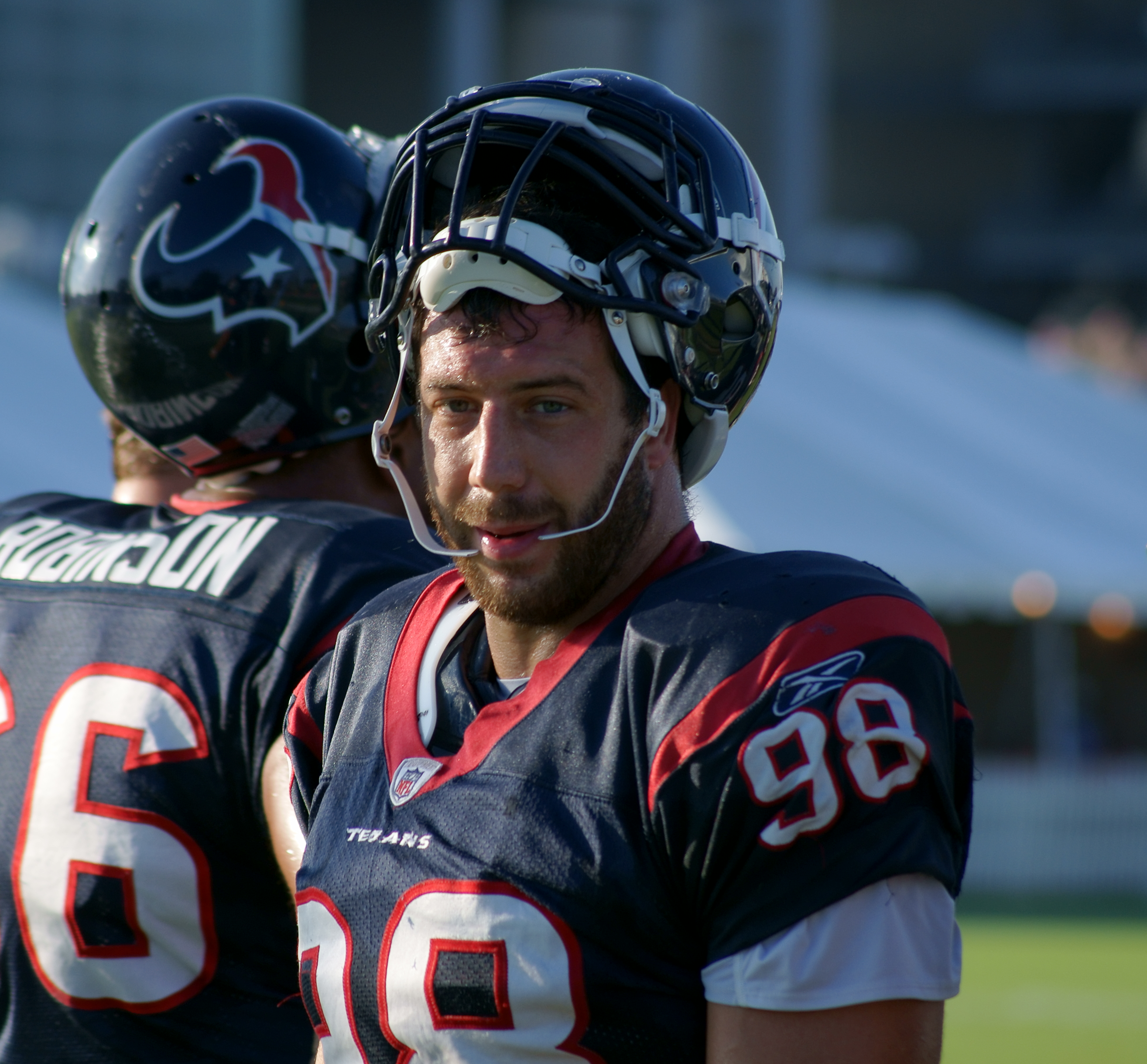
Barwin with the Texans in 2010

Barwin was selected by the Houston Texans in the second round, with the 46th overall pick, of the 2009 NFL draft. On October 18, 2009 Barwin recorded his first NFL sack against Cincinnati Bengals quarterback Carson Palmer. For the season, he played in all 16 Texans games and totaled 16 tackles, 4.5 sacks and four passes defensed.

Barwin's 2010 season was cut extremely short when he left the Texans' 2010 opener against the Indianapolis Colts with an ankle injury and was announced out for the season the next day.

Barwin returned from injury and moved from defensive end to outside linebacker in 2011, starting all 16 of the Texans' games as the Texans advanced to the second round of the AFC Playoffs. On November 27, 2011 Barwin established a career-best 10 tackles and a new franchise record for sacks in a game with four in the Texans' 20–13 victory over the Jacksonville Jaguars at EverBank Field; Mario Williams had previously held the Texans' single-game sack mark with 3.5. He was named AFC Defensive Player of the Month for November. Barwin finished the regular season with 49 tackles, 11.5 sacks, seven passes defensed, and a forced fumble.

Barwin played in all 16 games for the Texans in 2012, starting in 15, as the Texans again advanced to the second round of the AFC Playoffs. For the regular season, he totaled 45 tackles, 3.5 sacks, five passes defensed, and one safety, the first of his career on October 21 when he tackled Baltimore Ravens quarterback Joe Flacco in the end zone.

=== Philadelphia Eagles ===
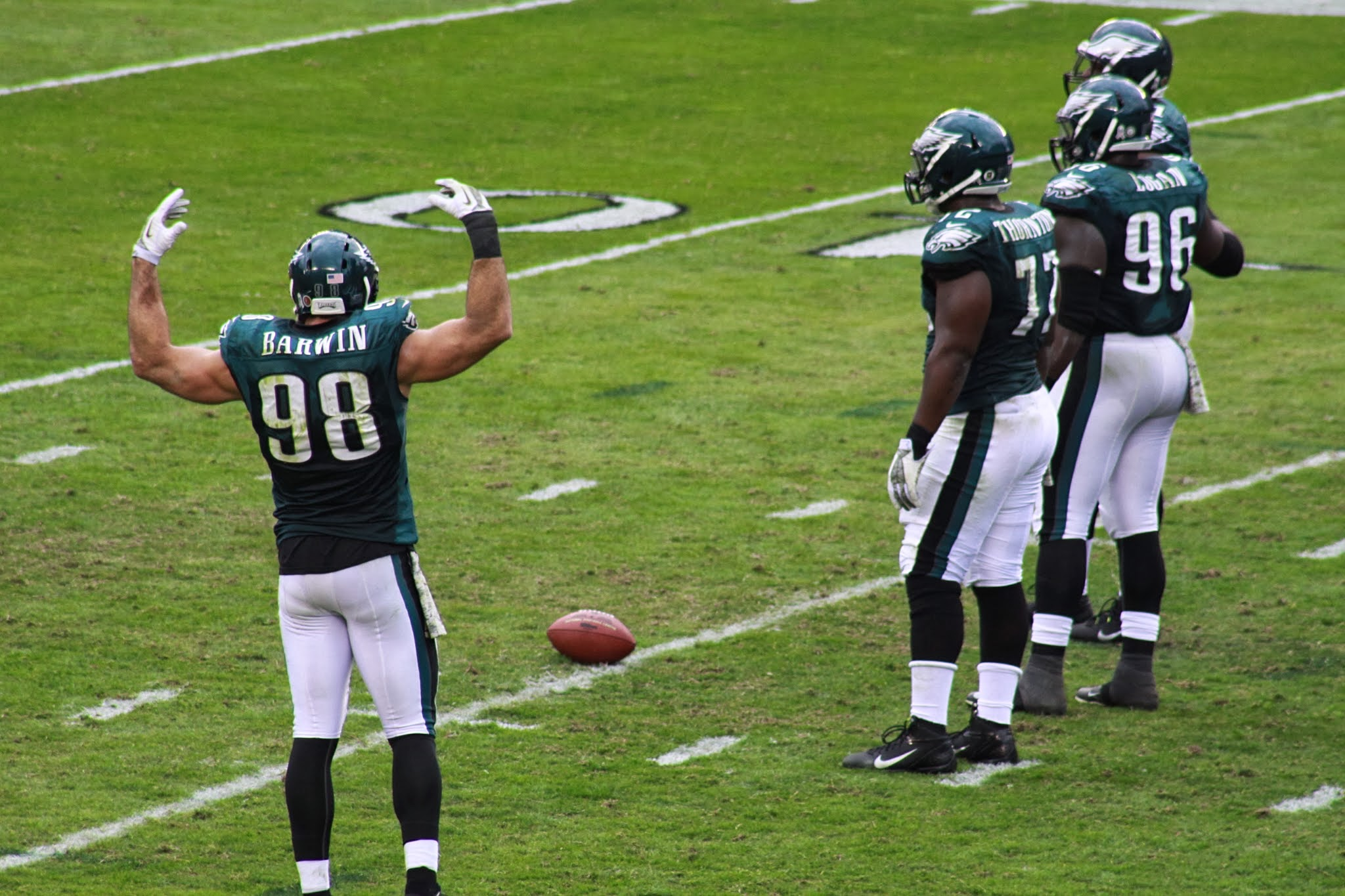
Barwin gesturing to the crowd during a game in 2013.

==== 2013 season ====
On March 14, 2013, Barwin signed a six-year, $36 million contract with $8 million guaranteed with the Philadelphia Eagles.

Barwin became the fourth Cincinnati Bearcat on the Eagles' roster, joining former roommate Jason Kelce and former teammate Brent Celek as well as Trent Cole. Barwin started all 16 games for the NFC East champion Eagles. On November 3, he intercepted his first NFL pass against the Oakland Raiders' Terrelle Pryor. On November 17, he totaled a career single-game high of 12 tackles against the Washington Redskins.

His season totals included career highs of 82 tackles, 12 passes defensed, one interception and one forced fumble. He also tallied five sacks. He had five tackles in the Eagles' playoff loss to the New Orleans Saints.

==== 2014 season ====
A March 31, 2014 column on NJ.com previewing the NFL draft called Barwin the Eagles' "MVP of the defense, and a leader in the locker room." Barwin started off the season strong, registering six sacks by week 6, with three sacks and one forced fumble in the October 12 shutout of the New York Giants (27–0). In a week 9 Monday Night Football matchup with the Carolina Panthers, Barwin sacked quarterback Cam Newton 3.5 times, totaling 10.5 on the season.

Barwin was named NFC Defensive Player of the Month for November. Barwin recorded 6.5 sacks, 24 tackles, two batted passes, and a forced fumble during the month. At the time of the award, Barwin had a season high total of 12.5 sacks. After only 2 sacks in December, Barwin still led the NFC in sacks with 14.5, but he had dropped to 4th overall in the NFL.

Barwin earned Associated Press second-team All-Pro honors and was named to his first Pro Bowl.

==== 2015 season ====
In the 2015 season, Barwin played in all 16 games. He recorded 54 tackles, 7.0 sacks, one forced fumble, and eight passes defended.

==== 2016 season ====
2016 was Barwin's last season with the Eagles. He played in all 16 games and recorded 34 tackles, 5.0 sacks, one forced fumble, and two passes defended.

On March 9, 2017, the Eagles released Barwin, saving them $7.75 million in cap space.

=== Los Angeles Rams ===
On March 16, 2017, Barwin signed a one-year, $6.5 million deal with the Los Angeles Rams.

=== New York Giants ===
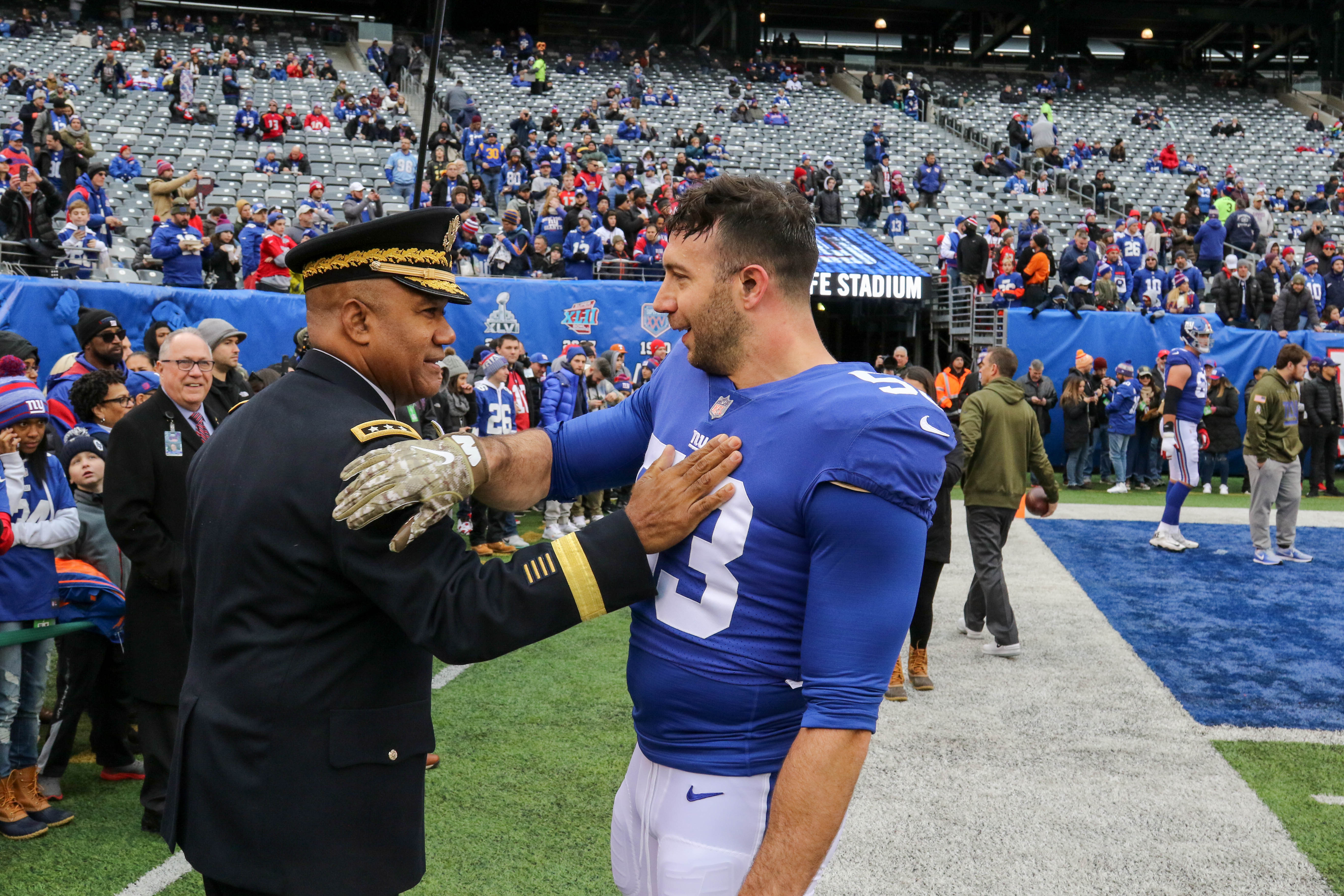
Barwin with the Giants in 2018.

On July 23, 2018, Barwin agreed to terms with the New York Giants. The next day he signed a two-year contract worth up to $5 million.

On February 4, 2019, Barwin was released by the Giants.

=== Retirement ===
On October 14, 2019, Barwin announced his retirement from playing.

== Executive career ==
=== Philadelphia Eagles ===
On January 17, 2020, Barwin returned to the Eagles as a special assistant to general manager Howie Roseman. On June 3, 2022, the Eagles moved Barwin to the role of player development director. On June 9, 2024, Barwin was again promoted, shifting to the role of head of football development and strategy. He was part of the staff when the Eagles defeated the Kansas City Chiefs 40–22 in Super Bowl LIX.

== Career statistics ==
Year	Team	GP	GS	COMB	TOTAL	AST	SACK	FF	FR	FR YDS	INT	IR YDS	AVG IR	LNG	TD	PD
2009	HOU	16	0	18	12	6	3.5	0	1	0	0	0	0	0	0	4
2010	HOU	1	0	Did not record any statistics due to injury												
2011	HOU	16	16	47	34	14	11.5	1	0	0	0	0	0	0	0	7
2012	HOU	16	16	44	37	9	3.0	0	1	0	0	0	0	0	0	5
2013	PHI	16	15	59	45	14	5.0	1	1	0	1	−2	−2	−2	0	10
2014	PHI	16	16	64	47	17	14.5	2	0	0	0	0	0	0	0	5
2015	PHI	16	16	54	44	10	7.0	1	0	0	0	0	0	0	0	7
2016	PHI	16	16	34	20	14	5.0	1	0	0	0	0	0	0	0	2
2017	LAR	14	13	34	26	8	5.0	0	1	0	0	0	0	0	0	0
2018	NYG	15	3	12	6	6	1.0	0	1	0	0	0	0	0	0	4
Career		142	112	366	270	96	56.5	6	4	0	1	−2	−2	−2	0	44

== Post-playing career ==
In 2022, Barwin served as executive producer of the Christmas album A Philly Special Christmas, recorded by his former Eagles teammates.
