= Jordan Davis (defensive tackle) =

American football player (born 2000)

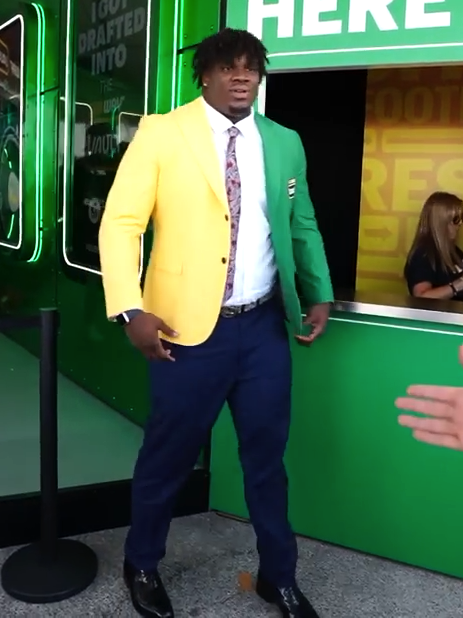
- Davis at the 2022 NFL draft

No. 90 – Jacksonville Jaguars
- Position: Defensive tackle
- Roster status: Active

Personal information
- Born: January 12, 2000 (age 26); Charlotte, North Carolina, U.S.
- Listed height: 6 ft 6 in (1.98 m)
- Listed weight: 336 lb (152 kg)

Career information
- High school: Mallard Creek (Charlotte)
- College: Georgia (2018–2021)
- NFL draft: 2022: 1st round, 13th overall pick

Career history
- Philadelphia Eagles (2022–2026); Jacksonville Jaguars (2026–present)

Awards and highlights
- Super Bowl champion (LIX); PFWA All-Rookie Team (2022); CFP national champion (2021); Chuck Bednarik Award (2021); Outland Trophy (2021); Unanimous All-American (2021); First-team All-SEC (2021); Second-team All-SEC (2020)

Career NFL statistics as of Week 9, 2026
- Total tackles: 193
- Sacks: 9.5
- Forced fumbles: 1
- Fumble recoveries: 1
- Pass deflections: 11
- Touchdowns: 1
- Stats at Pro Football Reference

Jordan Xavier Davis (born January 12, 2000) is an American professional football defensive tackle for the Jacksonville Jaguars of the National Football League (NFL). He played college football for the Georgia Bulldogs, where he was a part of the team that won the 2022 College Football Playoff National Championship while being named the Chuck Bednarik Award and Outland Trophy winner as a senior in 2021. Davis was selected by the Eagles in the first round of the 2022 NFL draft.

== Early life ==
Davis was born on January 12, 2000, in Charlotte, North Carolina. He played basketball at Hopewell High School before transferring to Mallard Creek High School as a junior, where he began to play football. He committed to play college football at Georgia, turning down offers from Clemson, Florida, Miami (Florida) and North Carolina.

== College career ==
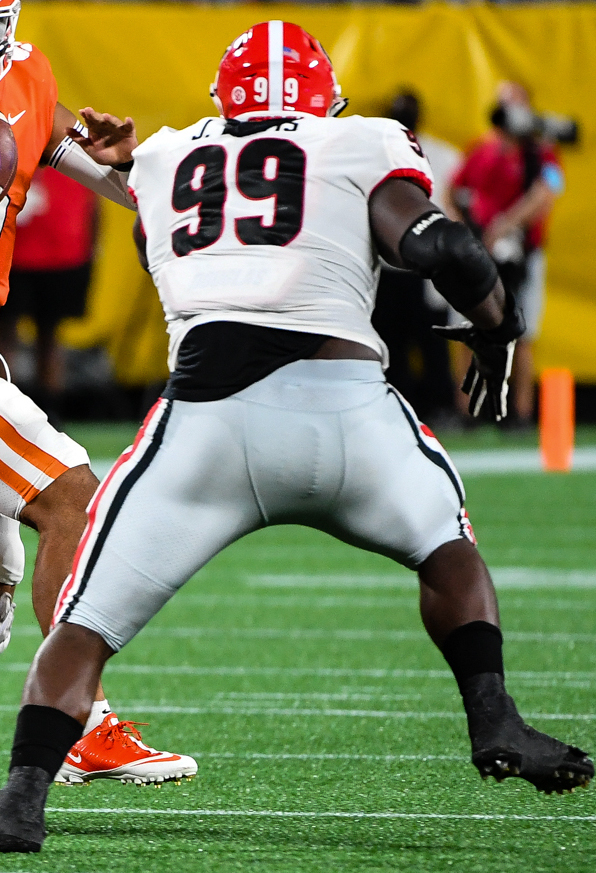
Davis with the Georgia Bulldogs in 2021

Davis played in 11 games with four starts as a true freshman, recording 25 tackles with 1.5 sacks and was named to the Southeastern Conference (SEC) All-Freshman team and a Freshman All-American by the Football Writers Association of America. As a sophomore, he had 18 tackles, 4.5 tackles for loss and 2.5 sacks. During the COVID-19 shortened 2020 season, Davis had 16 tackles and a sack while leading his team to a win in the 2021 Peach Bowl over Cincinnati. Davis had his best season as a senior with 32 tackles (17 solo), two sacks, one pass defended, and a rushing touchdown. After completing a perfect regular season, Davis and the Bulldogs fell to the Alabama Crimson Tide in the 2021 SEC Championship 41–24. Despite their loss, Georgia was ranked as the third seed in the 2021 College Football Playoffs. They went on to defeat the second-ranked Michigan Wolverines in the 2021 Orange Bowl, creating a rematch against Alabama in the 2022 College Football Playoff National Championship. Georgia defeated Alabama in the National Championship 33–18, claiming their first national championship since 1980. Davis earned Consensus All-American honors for the 2021 season. He won the Chuck Bednarik Award and the John Outland Trophy.

== Professional career ==
=== Pre-draft ===
Davis ran a 4.78-second 40-yard dash at the 2022 NFL Combine, making him just the third player over 330 pounds to run under five seconds after Dontari Poe (2012) and Greg Robinson (2014).

Pre-draft measurables
| Height | Weight | Arm length | Hand span | Wingspan | 40-yard dash | 10-yard split | 20-yard split | Vertical jump | Broad jump |
|---|---|---|---|---|---|---|---|---|---|
| 6 ft 6 3/8 in (1.99 m) | 341 lb (155 kg) | 34 in (0.86 m) | 10 3/4 in (0.27 m) | 6 ft 9 1/8 in (2.06 m) | 4.78 s | 1.63 s | 2.74 s | 32.0 in (0.81 m) | 10 ft 3 in (3.12 m) |
All values from NFL Combine

=== Philadelphia Eagles ===
Davis was selected by the Philadelphia Eagles in the first round of the 2022 NFL draft with the 13th overall pick. Davis signed a four-year, fully guaranteed $17 million contract, including a $9.55 million signing bonus. He was part of a modern-day single-draft record 15 draft picks for the Georgia Bulldogs.

==== 2022 season ====
Davis made his NFL debut in Week 1 of the 2022 season and contributed as a rotational player on the defensive line. On November 2, 2022, Davis was placed on injured reserve after suffering an ankle injury in Week 8. Davis ended his rookie season with 18 tackles and one pass defensed in 13 games and five starts. He was named to the PFWA All-Rookie Team. He helped the Eagles reach Super Bowl LVII where they lost 38–35 to the Kansas City Chiefs. Davis had a quarterback hit in the game.

==== 2023 season ====
In 2023, Davis took on a larger role in the Eagles' defense alongside former Georgia teammate Jalen Carter. He recorded his first NFL sack in the Eagles' Week 2 victory against the Minnesota Vikings. At the conclusion of the 2023 NFL season, Davis recorded 45 tackles, 2.5 sacks, one pass deflection, and one forced fumble. He expressed frustrations over his performance in the second half of the Eagles' season as the team went 11–6 and lost 9–32 in the Wild Card round to the Tampa Bay Buccaneers.

==== 2024 season ====
During the 2024 season, Davis would continue to serve as a rotational defensive linemen on the Eagles roster. His ability to disrupt opposing offenses, particularly in stopping the run, remained an asset for Philadelphia as they went 14–3 in the regular season. Davis recorded 27 tackles, one sack, two pass deflections, and one fumble recovery in the regular season. During the playoffs, he played a pivotal role in the defensive line, contributing significantly to their Super Bowl victory. Throughout the postseason, he recorded two sacks in his final two games, including a sack in the Eagles' 40–22 win over the Chiefs in Super Bowl LIX.

==== 2025 season ====
On April 30, 2025, the Eagles exercised the fifth-year option on Davis' contract, ensuring he will stay with the team through the 2026 season. Davis will receive $12.9 million for the 2026 season.

In Week 3 against the Los Angeles Rams, while the Eagles held a 27–26 lead in the final seconds of the game, Davis blocked a field goal attempt by Joshua Karty. He returned it 61 yards for his first career NFL touchdown, sealing a 33–26 win. He was named NFC Special Teams Player of the Week following this performance.

In Week 11 against the Detroit Lions, Davis deflected three passes from the line of scrimmage, one of which was tipped and intercepted by teammate Cooper DeJean. He was named NFC Defensive Player of the Week following this performance, becoming the first player in Eagles history to win Special Teams Player of the Week and Defense Player of the Week in the same season. He finished the 2025 season with 4.5 sacks, 72 total tackles (34 solo), and six passes defended.

==== 2026 season ====
On March 8, 2026, Davis signed a three-year, $78 million contract extension with the Eagles with $65 million guaranteed.

=== Jacksonville Jaguars ===
On November 9, 2026, Davis was traded to the Jacksonville Jaguars in exchange for a 2027 first-round pick and a 2029 second-round pick.

== Career statistics ==
=== NFL ===
Legend
| | Won the Super Bowl |
| **Bold** | Career high |

==== Regular season ====
| Year | Team | Games | | Tackles | | | | | Fumbles | | | | Interceptions | | | | | |
| Year | Team | GP | GS | Cmb | Solo | Ast | Sck | TFL | FF | FR | Yds | TD | Int | Yds | Avg | Lng | TD | PD |
|---|---|---|---|---|---|---|---|---|---|---|---|---|---|---|---|---|---|---|
| 2022 | PHI | 13 | 5 | 18 | 8 | 10 | 0.0 | 1 | 0 | 0 | 0 | 0 | 0 | 0 | 0 | 0 | 0 | 1 |
| 2023 | PHI | 17 | 17 | 45 | 18 | 27 | 2.5 | 2 | **1** | 0 | 0 | 0 | 0 | 0 | 0 | 0 | 0 | 1 |
| 2024 | PHI | 17 | 17 | 27 | 15 | 12 | 1.0 | 3 | 0 | **1** | 0 | 0 | 0 | 0 | 0 | 0 | 0 | 2 |
| 2025 | PHI | 17 | 17 | **72** | **34** | **38** | **4.5** | **9** | 0 | 0 | 0 | 0 | 0 | 0 | 0 | 0 | 0 | **6** |
| 2026 | PHI | 9 | 9 | 31 | 11 | 20 | 1.5 | 2 | 0 | 0 | 0 | 0 | 0 | 0 | 0 | 0 | 0 | 1 |
| Career | | 73 | 65 | 193 | 86 | 107 | 9.5 | 17 | 1 | 1 | 0 | 0 | 0 | 0 | 0 | 0 | 0 | 11 |

==== Postseason ====
| Year | Team | Games | | Tackles | | | | | Fumbles | | | | Interceptions | | | | | |
| Year | Team | GP | GS | Cmb | Solo | Ast | Sck | TFL | FF | FR | Yds | TD | Int | Yds | Avg | Lng | TD | PD |
|---|---|---|---|---|---|---|---|---|---|---|---|---|---|---|---|---|---|---|
| 2022 | PHI | 3 | 0 | 4 | 3 | 1 | 0.0 | 0 | 0 | 0 | 0 | 0 | 0 | 0 | 0 | 0 | 0 | 0 |
| 2023 | PHI | 1 | 1 | 2 | 1 | 1 | 0.0 | 0 | 0 | 0 | 0 | 0 | 0 | 0 | 0 | 0 | 0 | 0 |
| 2024 | PHI | 4 | 4 | **6** | **4** | **2** | **2.0** | **2** | 0 | 0 | 0 | 0 | 0 | 0 | 0 | 0 | 0 | **1** |
| 2025 | PHI | 1 | 1 | **6** | **4** | **2** | 0.0 | 1 | 0 | 0 | 0 | 0 | 0 | 0 | 0 | 0 | 0 | 0 |
| Career | | 9 | 6 | 18 | 12 | 6 | 2.0 | 3 | 0 | 0 | 0 | 0 | 0 | 0 | 0 | 0 | 0 | 1 |

=== College ===
| Season | GP | Tackles | | | | | Sacks | | Interceptions | | | | Fumbles | | | Blk | | Scoring |
| Season | GP | Solo | Ast | Comb | TFL | Yds | Sck | Yds | Int | Yds | PD | QBH | FR | Yds | FF | Kick | Saf | TD |
|---|---|---|---|---|---|---|---|---|---|---|---|---|---|---|---|---|---|---|
| 2018 | 11 | 6 | **19** | 25 | 1.5 | 6 | 1.5 | 6 | 0 | 0 | 0 | 3 | 0 | 0 | 0 | 0 | 0 | 0 |
| 2019 | 14 | 7 | 11 | 18 | 4.5 | **27** | **2.5** | **22** | 0 | 0 | 0 | 5 | 0 | 0 | 0 | 0 | 0 | 0 |
| 2020 | 7 | 7 | 9 | 16 | 1.0 | 3 | 1.0 | 3 | 0 | 0 | 0 | 4 | 0 | 0 | 0 | **1** | 0 | 0 |
| 2021 | **15** | **17** | 15 | **32** | **5.5** | 15 | 2.0 | 10 | 0 | 0 | **1** | **14** | 0 | 0 | 0 | 0 | 0 | **1** |
| Career | 47 | 37 | 54 | 91 | 12.5 | 51 | 7.0 | 41 | 0 | 0 | 1 | 26 | 0 | 0 | 0 | 1 | 0 | 1 |

== Personal life ==
In 2022, Davis provided vocals on the Christmas album A Philly Special Christmas Special.
