= Jordan Mailata =

Australian football player (born 1997)

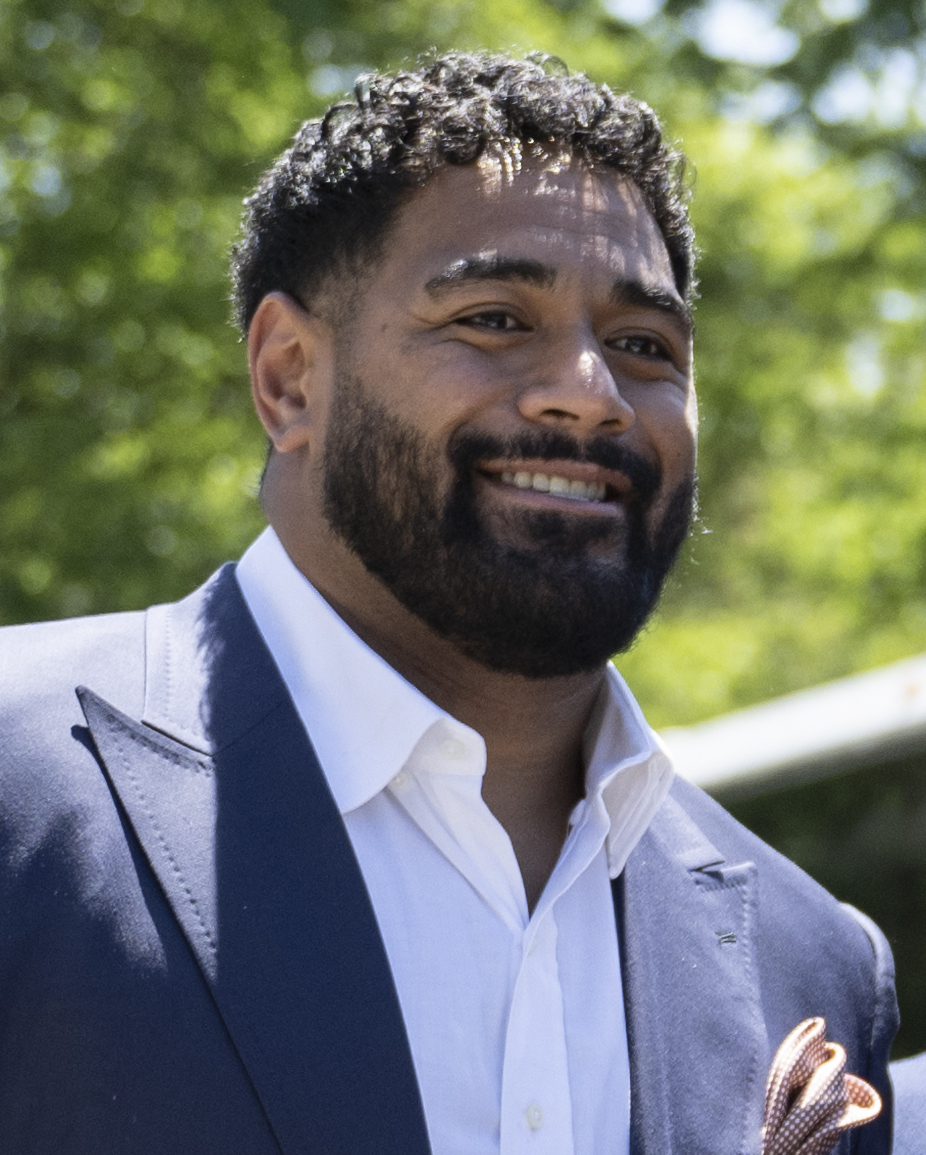
- Mailata in 2025
- Football career

No. 68 – Philadelphia Eagles
- Position: Offensive tackle
- Roster status: Active

Personal information
- Born: 31 March 1997 (age 29); Bankstown, New South Wales, Australia
- Listed height: 6 ft 8 in (2.03 m)
- Listed weight: 365 lb (166 kg)

Career information
- High school: Condell Park (Condell Park, New South Wales)
- College: None
- NFL draft: 2018: 7th round, 233rd overall pick

Career history
- Philadelphia Eagles (2018–present)

Awards and highlights
- Super Bowl champion (LIX); Second-team All-Pro (2024)

Career NFL statistics as of Week 9, 2026
- Games played: 99
- Games started: 94
- Stats at Pro Football Reference
- Rugby league career

Playing information
- Position: Prop
Club
Years	Team	Pld	T	G	FG	P
2017	South Sydney U-20s	12	8	0	0	32
- Source: As of 24 December 2018

Lafoga Jordan Mailata (/maɪˈlɑːtə/ my-LAH-tə; born 31 March 1997) is an Australian professional American football offensive tackle for the Philadelphia Eagles of the National Football League (NFL) and former rugby league player. He previously played rugby league for the Canterbury-Bankstown Bulldogs under-18s team and the South Sydney Rabbitohs on their under-20s team. He joined the NFL via the league's International Player Pathway Program and was selected in the seventh round, 233rd overall by the Eagles in the 2018 NFL draft. In 2025, Mailata was an integral part of the Eagles team that won Super Bowl LIX, the second title in the team's history.

== Rugby league career ==
Jordan Mailata grew up playing rugby league for the Bankstown Bulls, and was selected for the Canterbury-Bankstown Bulldogs' Under 18s team in 2015. The Canterbury-Bankstown Bulldogs are a professional rugby league side founded in 1934, and participate in the National Rugby League (NRL) in Australia. In 2014, Mailata fainted during a pre-season training session, one week before the Bulldog's first scheduled game in the S.G. Ball Cup. The S.G. Ball Cup is an Under-18s rugby league football competition which is hosted in New South Wales. This required surgery to repair both the upper and lower chambers of his heart. He went on hiatus from rugby league for over a year. During this time, it was reported that Mailata had jumped from 147 kilograms to 166 kilograms. After coming back from surgery, Mailata and his two brothers Daniel and Moana played rugby league for Five Dock RSL Junior Rugby League in Five Dock, at the A-grade level in the Balmain competition. It was in this competition that Mailata attracted the attention of Ben Rogers, a recruitment agent for the South Sydney Rabbitohs.

Mailata was then offered the opportunity to join the South Sydney Rabbitohs' U20s team in 2017. The South Sydney Rabbitohs offered Mailata a one-year contract worth AU$5,000 to play for the North Sydney Bears. The North Sydney Bears had a partnership with the South Sydney Rabbitohs in which they served as the Rabbitohs reserve grade team. This partnership was intact from 2007 until 2018, when the agreement ended. It has been stated that Mailata was only offered a reserve-grade contract due to fitness and conditioning concerns. The South Sydney coaching staff did not believe that Mailata would be able to physically keep up with the pace and nature of professional rugby league, due to the free-flowing play and limited stoppages in games. Mailata was given the advice from his agency to "play a sport that appreciates his size". Ultimately, Mailata declined the contract from the South Sydney Rabbitohs. There was no bad sentiment between Mailata and the Rabbitohs after the contract offer, as Mailata stated "They gave me a chance. Without them, I wouldn't be here".

== American football career ==
=== Pre-draft ===
Pre-draft measurables
Height	Weight	Arm length	Hand span	40-yard dash	20-yard shuttle	Three-cone drill	Vertical jump	Bench press
6 ft 7 3/4 in (2.03 m)	346 lb (157 kg)	35 1/2 in (0.90 m)	11 in (0.28 m)	5.12 s	4.67 s	6.76 s	28.5 in (0.72 m)	22 reps

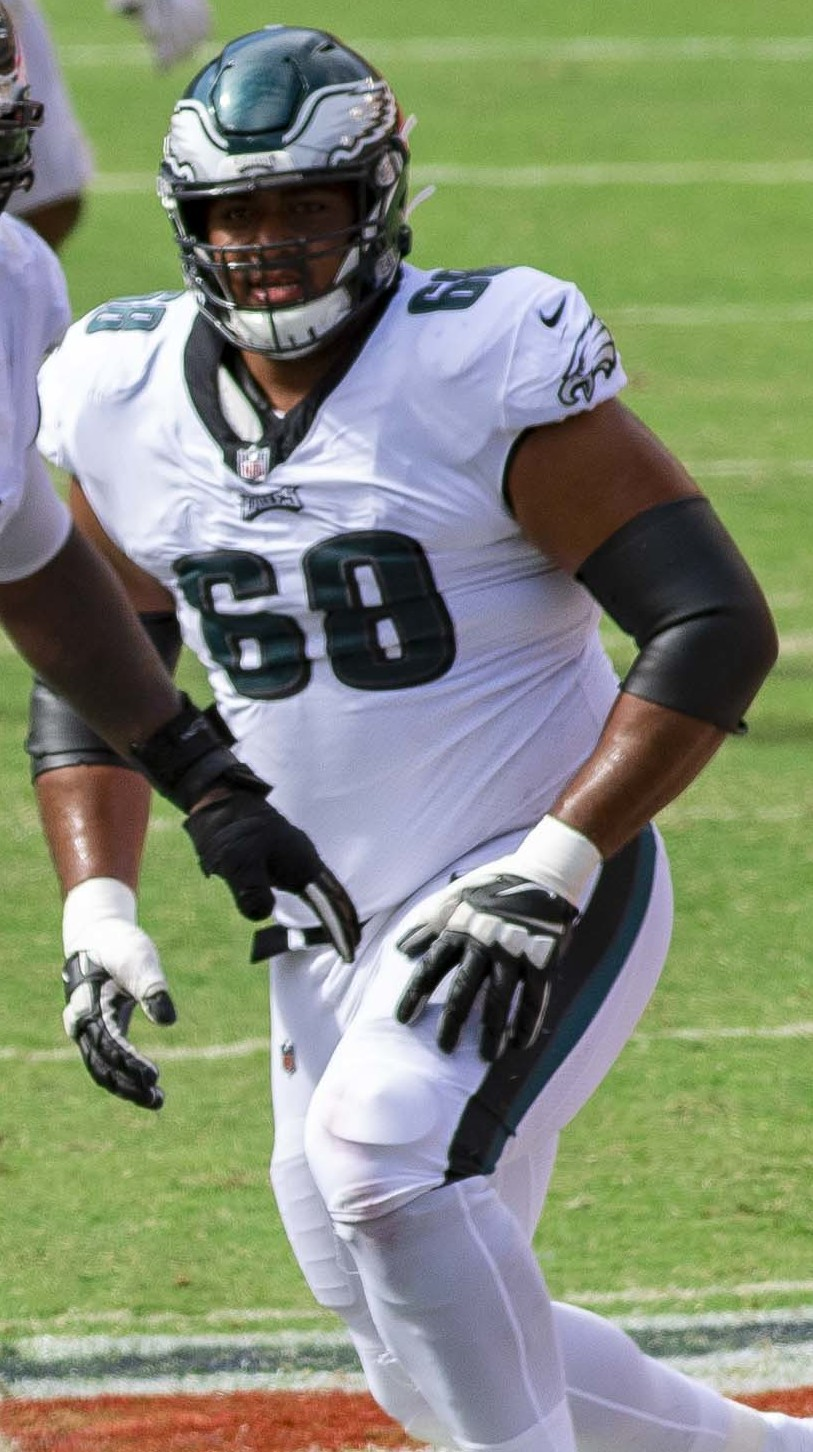
Mailata playing for the Philadelphia Eagles in 2020.

After seeing video clips of him playing rugby league, NFL executives invited Mailata to try out for their International Player Pathway Program. Mailata had never played American football and admitted that his knowledge of the game was minimal, and also stated that he would watch only one NFL game a year, the Super Bowl. In February 2018, he went to IMG Academy in Florida to train under the supervision and guidance of coach Aden Durde. While training, he was scouted by Philadelphia Eagles offensive line coach Jeff Stoutland. In the player introductions for NBC Sunday Night Football, Mailata pays credit to Stoutland's mentorship, saying he attended "Jeff Stoutland University", having had no collegiate football experience before entering the NFL.

NFL scouts evaluated Mailata as a 5.5 prospect grade, which equates to a practice squad player with a chance to make the bottom-end of the official NFL roster. Pre-draft scouting reports written about Mailata evaluated him as a "work in progress", and gave him the pro player comparison of then-Buffalo Bill OT Conor McDermott.

In March 2018, Mailata attended a combine at the Tampa Bay Buccaneers' practice facility, One Buc Place. The combine participants included five other international NFL prospects like Mailata, as well as a host of top-ranked college football prospects who did not receive an invite to the official NFL Combine. Several NFL team general managers were present, including Jason Licht of the Buccaneers and Rick Spielman of the Minnesota Vikings.

Mailata received doubts from scouts through the NFL drafting process and combine, as his weaknesses were listed as "will require an extensive period of development to learn technique", and "has never played a single down of American football". However, scouts did see positives in Mailata as they described him to have "very good physical traits" and "a tremendous size with a frame that carries weight well" due to his 6-foot-8 stature. IMG Academy strength and conditioning trainer Jay Butler stated that he had "never had anybody that looks like that," in reference to Mailata's sub-20% body fat percentage and physical attributes. Mailata was extremely quick for his frame, as he recorded a 5.12 second time in the 40-yard dash at the combine, the 7th-best time recorded for tackles at the February 2018 NFL combine. He managed to record a 4.67-second time for the short shuttle, which would have equated to a top-10 score amongst left tackles at the official NFL combine. Additionally, Mailata was able to achieve 22 reps at the combine bench press.

In response to his own performance, Mailata felt optimistic as he hoped that coaches would get "a chance to see the progress I have made as I try to master the position."

=== Philadelphia Eagles ===
Mailata was selected by the Philadelphia Eagles with the 233rd overall pick in the seventh round of the 2018 NFL draft. He became the second player to be selected with no American high school or college experience (the first being German Moritz Böhringer), following the path of fellow rugby league convert Jarryd Hayne. Mailata signed a four-year deal worth $2.5 million with a signing bonus of $89,392.

Mailata said that the biggest mental hurdle when transitioning from the rugby league to the NFL was the extensive playbook. He stated that when he first started training camp with the Eagles, he was handed a playbook and that it felt like "a different language." On 1 September 2018, Mailata made the initial 53-man roster for the Eagles. On 14 December, Mailata was placed on injured reserve after sustaining a back injury categorised as a stress fracture, which ended his rookie season before appearing in any games.

After missing the first two games of the 2019 season with a back injury, Mailata spent another season on injured reserve starting 21 September 2019.

Mailata was placed on the reserve/COVID-19 list by the Eagles on 29 July 2020. He was activated from the list on 13 August. On 13 September, Mailata made his NFL debut against the Washington Football Team, replacing injured rookie Jack Driscoll in the third quarter. Mailata made his first start for the Eagles in Week 4 of the 2020 season against the San Francisco 49ers, filling in for injured Jason Peters. On 1 November against the Dallas Cowboys, Mailata sustained a concussion in a helmet-to-helmet hit from Jaylon Smith. On 2 January 2021, Mailata was deemed unable to play against Washington due to the concussion, ending Mailata's season playing in 15 appearances with 10 starts for the Eagles. Mailata ended the 2020 season as a top-15 offensive tackle in the NFL from Week 11, as graded by Pro Football Focus. Over the course of the 2020 season, Mailata led the Eagles in fewest sacks allowed amongst offensive linemen (7). He also led Eagles' offensive linemen in pass pro snaps with 502, equating to a pass pro snaps per sack score of 71.7, which was third-best on the team behind Lane Johnson and Jack Driscoll.

On 31 August 2021, Eagles' head coach Nick Sirianni named Mailata the starting left tackle for the 2021 NFL season. On 11 September, Mailata signed a four-year, US$64 million contract including $40.85 million guaranteed.

Mailata helped the Eagles reach Super Bowl LVII where they lost to the Kansas City Chiefs 38–35.

His success has seen him frequently described by the media as a human "wrecking ball".

On 4 April 2024, Mailata signed a three-year, $66 million extension that includes $48 million guaranteed and a $20 million signing bonus. His contract extension will keep him with the team through the 2028 season. His new extension put him behind only Laremy Tunsil, Trent Williams and Andrew Thomas amongst the NFL’s highest-paid offensive tackles. After helping the Eagles to a second seed playoff position in the NFC, Mailata was named in the 2024 All Pro Second Team.

Mailata and the Eagles returned to the Super Bowl at the end of the 2024 season, defeating the Kansas City Chiefs, 40–22, to win Super Bowl LIX. As a result, Mailata became the second Australian player to win the Super Bowl, 11 years after Jesse Williams won Super Bowl XLVIII with the Seattle Seahawks in 2014. However, Mailata is the first Australian Super Bowl champion to start and play in a Super Bowl game, as Williams was on injured reserve.

== Music ==
Since joining the Eagles, Mailata has been noted for his singing ability.

In 2022, Mailata competed in season 7 of The Masked Singer as "Thingamabob" of Team Cuddly. He was eliminated alongside Jorge Garcia as "Cyclops" of Team Bad.

During the 2022 offseason, he formed the vocal group The Philly Specials along with teammates Jason Kelce and Lane Johnson and recorded a Christmas album titled A Philly Special Christmas. The sequel, A Philly Special Christmas Special, was released in December 2023. Their third and final album, A Philly Special Christmas Party, was released on 22 November 2024.

== Personal life ==
Mailata is the son of Samoan immigrants to Australia and was born in Bankstown, an area of Sydney characterised by its high concentration of Samoan immigrants. He retains New Zealand citizenship, owing to his mother coming from there. Mailata's middle name, Jordan, was given to him by his sister after the basketball superstar Michael Jordan.

Mailata is sponsored by Australian clothing company Johnny Bigg, which specialises in clothes for people with large frames. He graduated at Condell Park High School. In July 2023, Mailata married his longtime partner Niki Ikahihifo-Bender, a lawyer from Alaska.

After Mailata appeared on his teammate Jason Kelce's podcast and mentioned that he identifies as Australian but he's not a citizen of the country, Australia's Prime Minister Anthony Albanese said he would "fast track" citizenship for Mailata.

As a child Mailata supported the Wests Tigers in the NRL and has described Benji Marshall, James Maloney, and Sonny Bill Williams as his favourite rugby league footballers. He is also a self-professed Wallabies fan.

== Filmography ==
Mailata was featured in Kelce as one of Jason Kelce's teammates during the 2022–2023 season.

=== Philanthropy ===
Mailata and his wife Niki Ikahihifo-Bender Mailata created the Mailata Family Foundation in 2026. The foundation provides scholarships, mentorship and resources to Philadelphia youth.

== See also ==
- List of players who have converted from one football code to another
