= Lane Johnson =

American football player (born 1990)

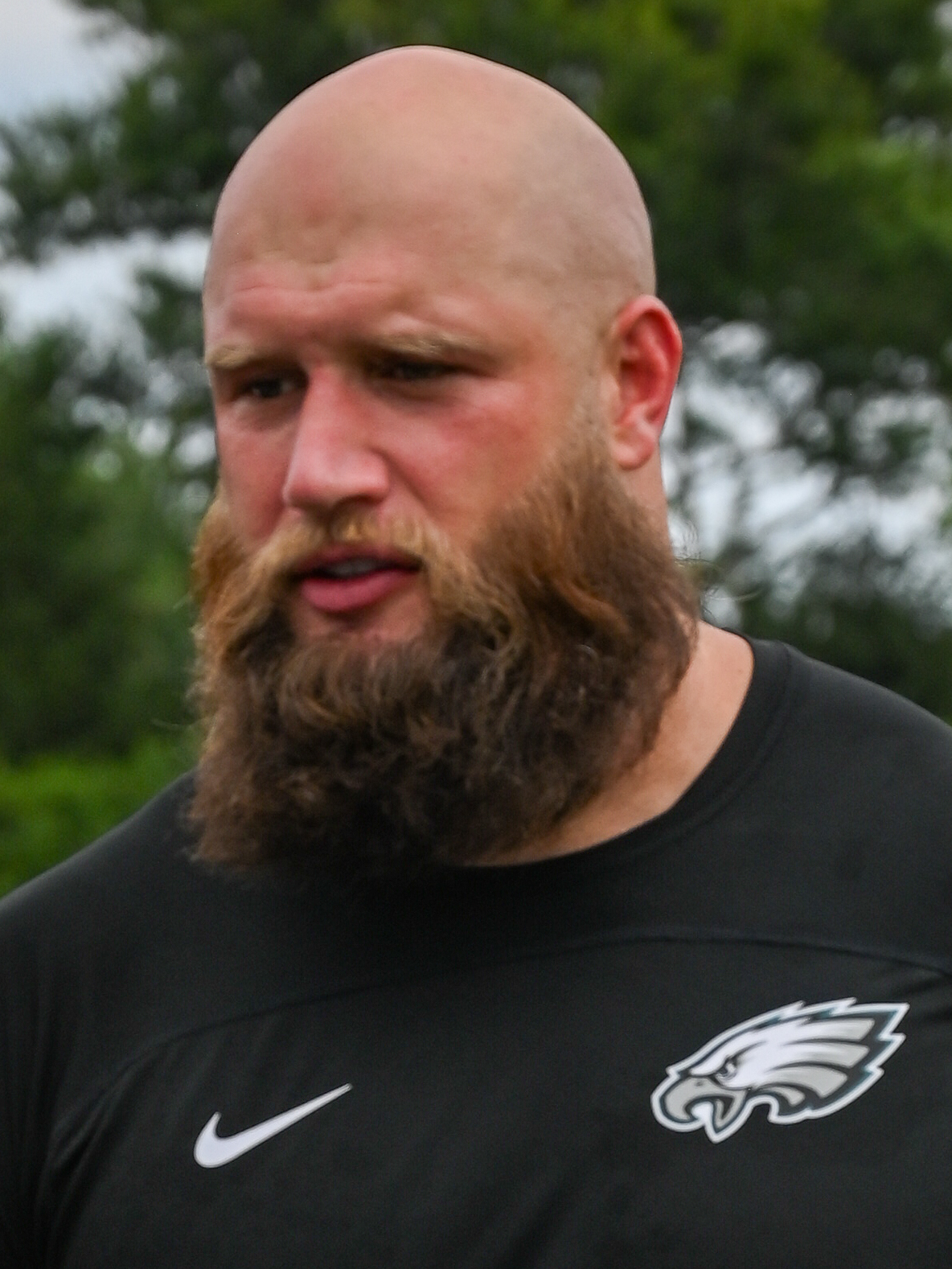
- Johnson with the Philadelphia Eagles in 2025

No. 65
- Position: Offensive tackle

Personal information
- Born: May 8, 1990 (age 36); Groveton, Texas, U.S.
- Listed height: 6 ft 6 in (1.98 m)
- Listed weight: 325 lb (147 kg)

Career information
- High school: Groveton
- College: Kilgore (2008); Oklahoma (2009–2012)
- NFL draft: 2013: 1st round, 4th overall pick

Career history
- Philadelphia Eagles (2013–2026)

Awards and highlights
- 2× Super Bowl champion (LII, LIX); 2× First-team All-Pro (2017, 2022); 3× Second-team All-Pro (2021, 2023, 2024); 6× Pro Bowl (2017–2019, 2022–2024); Built Ford Tough Offensive Line of the Year (2017); Second-team All-Big 12 (2012)

Career NFL statistics
- Games played: 171
- Games started: 171
- Fumble recoveries: 4
- Stats at Pro Football Reference

David Lane Johnson (born May 8, 1990) is an American former professional football offensive tackle who played 14 seasons in the National Football League (NFL) with the Philadelphia Eagles. He played college football for the Kilgore Rangers before transferring to the Oklahoma Sooners, and was selected by the Eagles fourth overall in the 2013 NFL draft. Johnson made three Super Bowl appearances with the Eagles, winning two (LII, LIX). He was a two-time first-team All-Pro, three-time second All-Pro, and six-time Pro Bowl selection.

== Early life ==
Johnson was born in Groveton, Texas, and attended Groveton High School, where he played football and competed in track. In football, he was an honorable mention All-state selection as a quarterback, and was named All-district.

In track and field, Johnson competed in the throwing events. He earned a fourth-place finish in the shot put event at the 2008 UIL 1A State Championships, with a top-throw of 15.21 meters (49 ft 7 in).

== College career ==
Johnson attended Kilgore College, a junior college in East Texas, and played quarterback and tight end for the Kilgore Rangers football team for the 2008 season. In his sole year at Kilgore, Johnson amassed 510 passing yards for 3 touchdowns and 7 interceptions with a 52.4% completion rate while at quarterback.

After his freshman year, he transferred to the University of Oklahoma, where he played for the Oklahoma Sooners football team from 2009 to 2012. Originally serving as a practice squad quarterback during his redshirt season, he transitioned to tight end in the fall of 2010 and switched again to defensive end for the spring of 2011. After two starting linemen went down with injuries at the beginning of the 2011 fall season, offensive line coach Bruce Kittle asked multiple players, including Johnson, to try out as back-up linemen to fill in the missing roster depth. Kittle was amazed by Johnson's footwork and natural pass blocking abilities and immediately switched him to offensive tackle. Two games later, Johnson would be named the Sooners' starting right tackle, and he would start the remaining 12 games of the season. As a senior in 2012, he switched to left tackle and started 11 of 13 games. and was named a third-team All-American by CBSSports.com. He was inducted into the Senior Bowl Hall of Fame on June 25, 2023. Johnson was named to the Senior Bowl 75th Anniversary Team in November 2023.

== Professional career ==
=== Pre-draft ===
On December 21, 2012, it was announced that Johnson and teammate Landry Jones had accepted their invitations to the 2013 Senior Bowl. Throughout Senior Bowl practices, Johnson demonstrated impressive footwork, body control, and balance while diagnosing pass rushes and disrupting them. He was named a top standout during practice by NFL analyst Bucky Brooks and immensely helped his draft stock to put himself in the first round discussion. On January 26, 2013, he played offensive tackle in the Reese's Senior Bowl and was part of Detroit Lions' head coach Jim Schwartz's South team that defeated the North 21–16. Johnson was one of 57 collegiate offensive linemen that attended the NFL Scouting Combine in Indianapolis, Indiana. He completed all of the combine drills and finished first in the vertical jump and second amongst all offensive linemen in the 40-yard dash and broad jump. On March 13, 2013, Johnson attended Oklahoma's pro day, along with Landry Jones, Tony Jefferson, Demontre Hurst, Kenny Stills, Stacy McGee, and 19 other prospects. During the draft process, Johnson attended multiple private workouts and visits, including the Carolina Panthers, New York Jets, and Philadelphia Eagles. At the conclusion of the pre-draft process, Johnson was projected to be a guaranteed first-round pick by NFL draft experts and scouts and was projected be a top ten selection. He was ranked the third best offensive tackle prospect in the draft by NFLDraftScout.com, NFL analyst Mike Mayock, and NFL analyst Josh Norris.

Pre-draft measurables
Height	Weight	Arm length	Hand span	Wingspan	40-yard dash	10-yard split	20-yard split	20-yard shuttle	Three-cone drill	Vertical jump	Broad jump	Bench press
6 ft 6 in (1.98 m)	303 lb (137 kg)	35 1/4 in (0.90 m)	10 1/8 in (0.26 m)	6 ft 11 3/8 in (2.12 m)	4.72 s	1.68 s	2.73 s	4.52 s	7.31 s	34 in (0.86 m)	9 ft 10 in (3.00 m)	28 reps
All values from NFL Combine

=== 2013 ===
The Eagles selected Johnson in the first round (fourth overall) of the 2013 NFL draft. He was the third offensive tackle selected in 2013, behind Central Michigan's Eric Fisher and Texas A&M's Luke Joeckel. On July 20, 2013, the Eagles signed Johnson to a four-year, $19.85 million contract with a signing bonus of $12.81 million.

He entered training camp behind veteran Dennis Kelly on the Eagles depth chart. He competed against Kelly for the starting right tackle role throughout training camp. He became the apparent starting right tackle during training camp when it was reported that Kelly would miss the majority of the season after undergoing back surgery.

He made his first career start and professional regular season debut in the Eagles' season-opening 33–27 victory at the Washington Redskins. He started all 16 regular season games as a rookie and helped the Eagles finish first in the NFC East with a 10–6 record. On January 4, 2014, Johnson started his first career playoff game as the Eagles lost to the New Orleans Saints 26–24 in the NFC Wildcard game. He was ranked as the 26th best right tackle by Pro Football Focus in 2013.

=== 2014 ===
On June 30, 2014, it was reported that Johnson had tested positive for performance-enhancing drugs and would be suspended for the first four games of the 2014 season. Although Johnson missed the first four games of the season, he allowed only one sack in the remainder of the year and started 14 consecutive games while being graded as the second best right tackle and was ranked the 13th overall offensive linemen by Pro Football Focus. Pro Football Focus named Johnson to the 2014 PFF All-Pro Team. The Eagles finished second in the NFC East with a 10–6 record and did not qualify for the playoffs.

=== 2015 ===
Johnson played through numerous injuries, but started all 16 games, including two games at left tackle after Jason Peters was inactive after suffering a back injury. Pro Football Focus ranked Johnson tenth best right tackle in 2015 with an overall grade of +14.5. Offensive coordinator Pat Shurmur was named interim head coach for Week 17 after head coach Chip Kelly was fired after Week 16 with the Eagles finishing 7–9.

=== 2016 ===
On January 29, 2016, Johnson signed a six-year, $63 million extension with $35.5 million guaranteed. This contract made Johnson the highest paid right tackle in the NFL. Johnson entered training camp slated as the Eagles' starting right tackle, opposite Jason Peters.

On August 9, 2016, it was reported that Johnson would face a ten-game suspension due to PED violations. Johnson stated that he was unaware the substance he failed for was banned and that the NFLPA's player app didn't have the banned substance listed. On October 11, 2016, his ten-game suspension was upheld. The suspension voided the last year of his contract and also voided all remaining base salary guarantees that totaled $7.74 million. Allen Barbre replaced Johnson during his absence.

Johnson returned to the team for their Week 16 game against the New York Giants on December 22, 2016. Johnson has an ongoing lawsuit against the NFL and the NFL Players Association stemming from his 10-game suspension for his second failed drug test.

The Eagles' offensive line was ranked eighth in the league by Pro Football Focus. They also gave Johnson a run blocking grade of 86.7 and he was ranked sixth among all right tackles. Due to the suspension, Johnson only started six games in 2016 (Week 1–5, 16–17). The Eagles finished fourth in the NFC East with a 7–9 record in their first season under head coach Doug Pederson.

=== 2017 ===
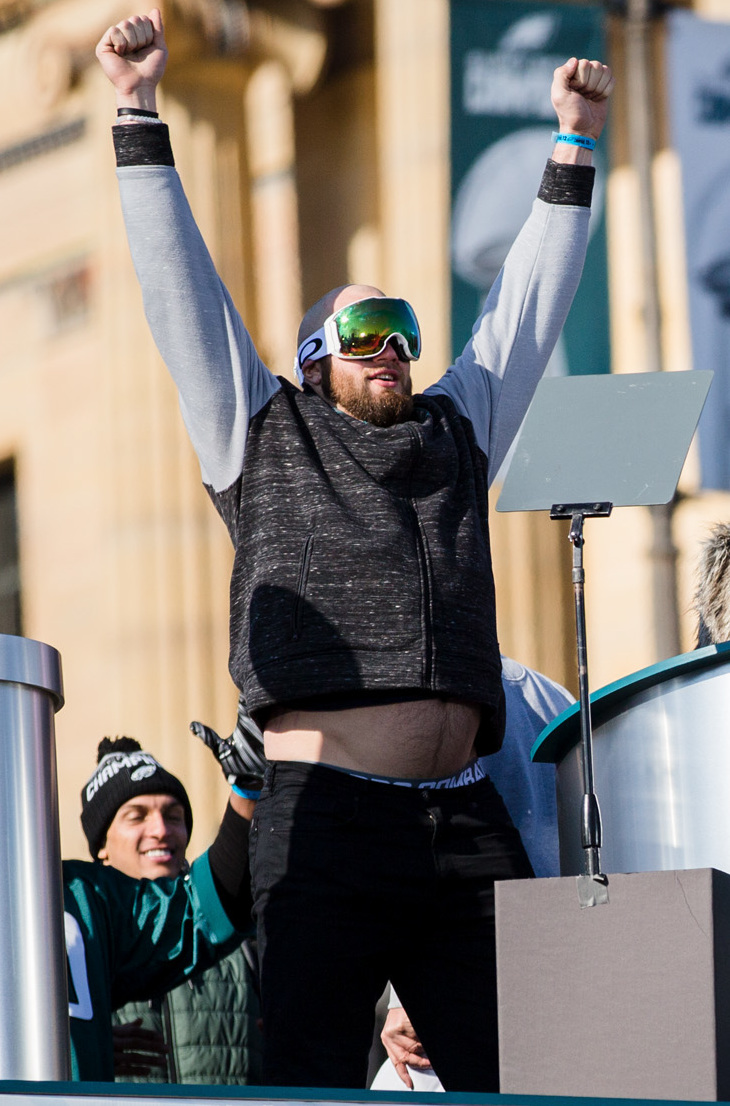
Johnson during the Eagles' Super Bowl LII victory parade

Johnson remained the Eagles' starting right tackle in 2017. He suffered a concussion during a Week 5 victory over the Arizona Cardinals. Johnson remained in the concussion protocol and missed the Eagles' next game that took place five days later on Thursday Night Football. He started 15 games to help the Eagles achieve a 13–3 record and go from worst to first, finishing atop the NFC East division after finishing last in 2016.

On December 19, 2017, Johnson was named to his first Pro Bowl along with right guard Brandon Brooks. Near the end of the season, Johnson received an overall grade of 85.2 and ranked fifth amongst all offensive tackles by Pro Football Focus. He was ranked the top right tackle and received a $250,000 bonus for making the Pro Bowl. Johnson did not attend the Pro Bowl as the Eagles would play in Super Bowl LII. He was ranked 95th by his peers on the NFL Top 100 Players of 2018.

Johnson and Chris Long wore rubber masks of a German Shepherd (symbolic of the team's underdog status) after the 2017 Divisional playoff game versus the Atlanta Falcons, as the Falcons were considered favorites to win. Following the game, Eagles fans bought so many dog masks from Amazon that they were sold out. In Super Bowl LII, the Eagles defeated the New England Patriots 41–33 to give Johnson his first Super Bowl ring.

=== 2019–2020 ===
On November 29, 2019, Johnson signed a four-year, $72 million contract extension with the Eagles with $54.595 million guaranteed, making him the highest-paid offensive lineman in the NFL.

Johnson was placed on the reserve/COVID-19 list by the Eagles on July 29, 2020. He was activated on August 11, 2020. He was placed on injured reserve on December 2, 2020.

=== 2021 ===
In the middle of the season, Johnson sat out 3 games due to a battle with depression.

In the December, 26th division match vs the New York Giants, Johnson was declared an eligible receiver for a play and caught a pass from Jalen Hurts for a 5-yard touchdown, his first ever touchdown catch.

The Associated Press named him a second-team All Pro for the 2021 season.

=== 2022 ===
On December 11, 2022, Johnson set an NFL record of not allowing a sack in 26 consecutive games. On December 26, it was announced that Johnson would miss the remainder of the regular season after suffering a torn tendon in his abdomen. Johnson and the Eagles reached Super Bowl LVII, which they lost to the Kansas City Chiefs, 38–35. He earned Pro Bowl and first team All-Pro honors for the 2022 season. He was ranked 41st by his fellow players on the NFL Top 100 Players of 2023.

=== 2023 ===
On March 24, 2023, the Eagles signed Johnson to a one-year contract extension through the 2026 season with $30 million guaranteed. He started in 16 games and was named to his second consecutive Pro Bowl. He also earned second team All-Pro honors. He was ranked 41st by his fellow players on the NFL Top 100 Players of 2024.

=== 2024 ===
In the 2024 season, Johnson started 15 games for Philadelphia, and won another Super Bowl championship when the Eagles defeated the Kansas City Chiefs 40–22 in Super Bowl LIX. He is one of four Eagles to appear on both Super Bowl-winning teams, along with Brandon Graham, Jake Elliott, and Rick Lovato. He was graded as the fifth best tackle in the league by Pro Football Focus with an 88.9 grade. He was named to his third consecutive Pro Bowl making it the sixth time he had earned the honor in his career. He also earned second team All-Pro honors for the second consecutive season. He was ranked 23rd by his fellow players on the NFL Top 100 Players of 2025.

=== 2025 ===
On March 17, 2025, Johnson signed a one-year contract extension with the Eagles, which added $8 million over the next two years and an additional $30 million in guarantees. During a Week 11 game against the Detroit Lions, Johnson sprained his foot, causing him to miss the rest of the season.

=== 2026 and retirement ===
In August 2026, Johnson announced that the upcoming season would "probably" be his last.

Prior to the Eagles' Week 4 game against the Los Angeles Rams, Johnson was made inactive for personal reasons. Two days after the game, he announced his immediate retirement from professional football via social media.

== Personal life ==
Johnson was married to Chelsea Goodman from January 2013 raising three children together until a 2019 separation. Goodman attended the NFL draft with Johnson, as they met at the University of Oklahoma, where Goodman was a high jumper. Johnson's former father-in-law is John Goodman, who played defensive end for the Pittsburgh Steelers from 1980 to 1985.

On May 22, 2019, Johnson donated $500,000 to Kilgore College for the development of "The Lane" Athletic Performance Center, a 3,800 square-foot training facility that opened March 3, 2021, on the Kilgore College campus. Johnson attended the grand opening of the facility.

Johnson and Eagles teammates Jason Kelce and Jordan Mailata formed the vocal group The Philly Specials, and in 2022, released the Christmas album A Philly Special Christmas. Its sequel, A Philly Special Christmas Special, was released in December 2023. Their third and final album, A Philly Special Christmas Party, was released on November 22, 2024.

On April 6, 2024, Johnson and former Eagles teammate Jason Kelce (wearing Luchador masks) participated in WrestleMania XL, helping Rey Mysterio and Andrade win their match. The event was held in Philadelphia at Lincoln Financial Field.
