= Jason Kelce =

American football player (born 1987)

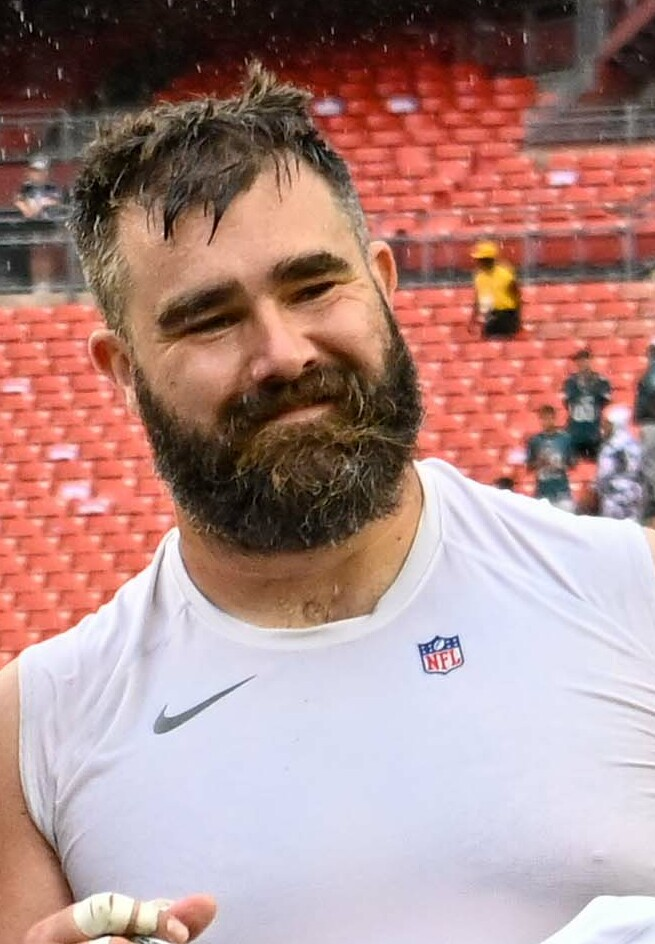
- Kelce with the Philadelphia Eagles in 2022

No. 62
- Position: Center

Personal information
- Born: November 5, 1987 (age 39); Greenville, North Carolina, U.S.
- Listed height: 6 ft 3 in (1.91 m)
- Listed weight: 295 lb (134 kg)

Career information
- High school: Cleveland Heights (Cleveland Heights, Ohio)
- College: Cincinnati (2006–2010)
- NFL draft: 2011: 6th round, 191st overall pick

Career history
- Philadelphia Eagles (2011–2023)

Awards and highlights
- Super Bowl champion (LII); 6× First-team All-Pro (2017–2019, 2021–2023); 7× Pro Bowl (2014, 2016, 2019–2023); Built Ford Tough Offensive Line of the Year (2017); 2× Second-team All-Big East (2009, 2010)

Career NFL statistics
- Games played: 193
- Games started: 193
- Fumble recoveries: 7
- Stats at Pro Football Reference

Jason Daniel Kelce (/ˈkɛlsi/ KEL-see; born November 5, 1987) is an American former professional football center who spent 13 seasons in the National Football League (NFL) with the Philadelphia Eagles. Kelce played college football for the Cincinnati Bearcats and was selected by the Eagles in the sixth round of the 2011 NFL draft. He won Super Bowl LII, was a seven-time Pro Bowl selection, and six-time first-team All-Pro selection. Kelce is widely regarded as one of the greatest centers in NFL history.

Outside of football, Kelce and his brother, Travis, co-host the podcast New Heights, on which they discuss their playing careers and various other topics. In 2024, Kelce joined ESPN's Monday Night Countdown pregame crew.

== Early life ==
Jason Daniel Kelce was born in Greenville, North Carolina, and grew up in Cleveland Heights, Ohio, to Ed Kelce, a sales representative in the steel business, and Donna (née Blalock), who works in banking. He is the older brother of Travis Kelce, a tight end for the Kansas City Chiefs. In their January 2025 podcast, the Kelce brothers revealed their partial Croatian background; two of their maternal grandparents, a great-grandmother and a grandmother, were born to parents of Croatian descent. However, another maternal great-grandmother, Helen Henrietta Sadlowski, was born to Polish immigrants, while a maternal great-grandfather named Frank Petranck was born to Czech immigrants.

Jason attended Cleveland Heights High School, where he played both running back and linebacker and was twice named All-Lake Erie League. At Cleveland Heights, he played baritone saxophone in the symphonic and jazz bands. Kelce also played hockey and lacrosse in high school.

== College career ==
A former walk-on running back, Kelce switched to fullback and then finally to offensive line after redshirting his initial year at the University of Cincinnati (UC), seeing action at center and guard in nine games in 2007 as the Bearcats went 10–3 and defeated Southern Mississippi 31–21 in the PapaJohns.com Bowl.

As a sophomore in 2008, he made 13 starts at left guard, as part of an offensive line that also included future NFL linemen Jeff Linkenbach and Trevor Canfield, which helped the UC offense average 27.3 points and 375.3 yards of total offense per game. The Bearcats went 11–3 overall, were Big East Conference champions, and played in the FedEx Orange Bowl, where the Bearcats fell to Virginia Tech 20–7. In 2008, his brother, Travis, began playing alongside him at Cincinnati.

In 2009, Kelce earned second-team All-Big East honors after starting 13 games at left guard as the Bearcats went undefeated in the regular season (12–0) and were again Big East Champions, once again earning a BCS Bowl berth, losing to Florida 51–24 in the Allstate Sugar Bowl.

He was moved to center for his senior season in 2010 as the Bearcats went 4–8 under new coach Butch Jones. He started the final 38 games of his 47-game Bearcats career, 26 at left guard and 12 at center. He was named Honorable Mention All-America and second-team All-Big East.

== Professional career ==
Despite lacking true NFL size, Kelce was projected a fourth round pick. He ran the fastest 40-yard dash time of all offensive linemen at the 2011 NFL Scouting Combine, with a 4.89-second time. On March 11, 2011, Kelce had an appendectomy after he was diagnosed with appendicitis.

Pre-draft measurables
Height	Weight	Arm length	Hand span	Wingspan	40-yard dash	10-yard split	20-yard split	20-yard shuttle	Three-cone drill	Vertical jump	Broad jump
6 ft 2 5/8 in (1.90 m)	280 lb (127 kg)	32 1/2 in (0.83 m)	9 1/2 in (0.24 m)	6 ft 5 1/4 in (1.96 m)	4.93 s	1.76 s	2.89 s	4.14 s	7.22 s	30.5 in (0.77 m)	9 ft 2 in (2.79 m)
All values from 2011 NFL Scouting Combine

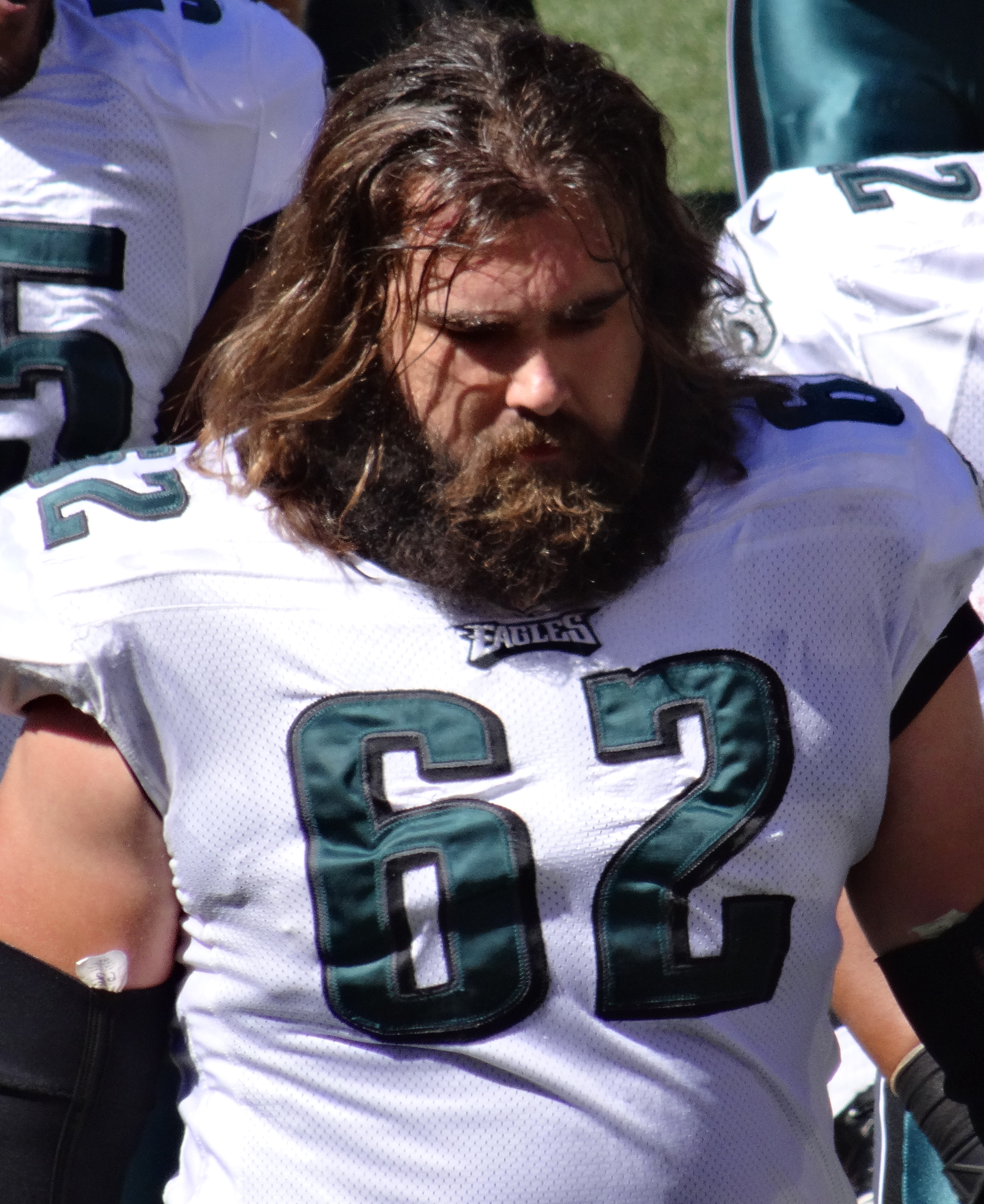
Kelce with the Philadelphia Eagles in 2013

Kelce was selected by the Philadelphia Eagles in the sixth round (191st overall) of the 2011 NFL draft. Kelce was unable to practice or sign a contract until the NFL lockout was lifted on July 25, 2011. He signed a four-year contract on July 27. New offensive line coach Howard Mudd envisioned Kelce as in the mold of Indianapolis Colts five-time Pro Bowl center Jeff Saturday, whom Mudd coached in Indianapolis for 11 seasons. First-round pick and fellow rookie Danny Watkins compared Kelce to a hedgehog due to his spiky hair and facial hair, in addition to his quickness and stoutness. Kelce battled incumbent starter Jamaal Jackson for the center job early in training camp in August. Kelce received all of the first-team reps in the week before the team's third preseason game. He started in the third preseason game against the Cleveland Browns, and allowed a sack and was penalized for holding. Kelce was named the starter for the season on August 29. He became the first rookie in Eagles history to start all 16 games at center.

In 2012, Kelce was named the starting center for the second consecutive year. On September 16, he suffered a partially torn MCL and a torn ACL in a win over the Baltimore Ravens. Kelce would miss the rest of the 2012 season. In the 2013 season, Kelce started all 16 games. The Eagles reached the playoffs, and set team season records of 442 points and 6,676 yards. He led the way for the NFL's leading rusher, LeSean McCoy, who rushed for 1,607 yards. Kelce was graded by Pro Football Focus (PFF) as the best center in the NFL for the season. He was also honored with the Ed Block Courage Award.

On February 27, 2014, Kelce agreed to a six-year, $37.5 million contract extension, with $13 million guaranteed, according to agent Jason Bernstein. On September 23, Kelce underwent surgery for a sports hernia and missed four games. Despite missing time, he was selected to his first Pro Bowl. He followed his 2014 Pro Bowl campaign by starting in all 16 games in 2015. He was graded by PFF as the 7th-ranked center in the NFL. The next season, he started in all 16 games and was selected to his second Pro Bowl.

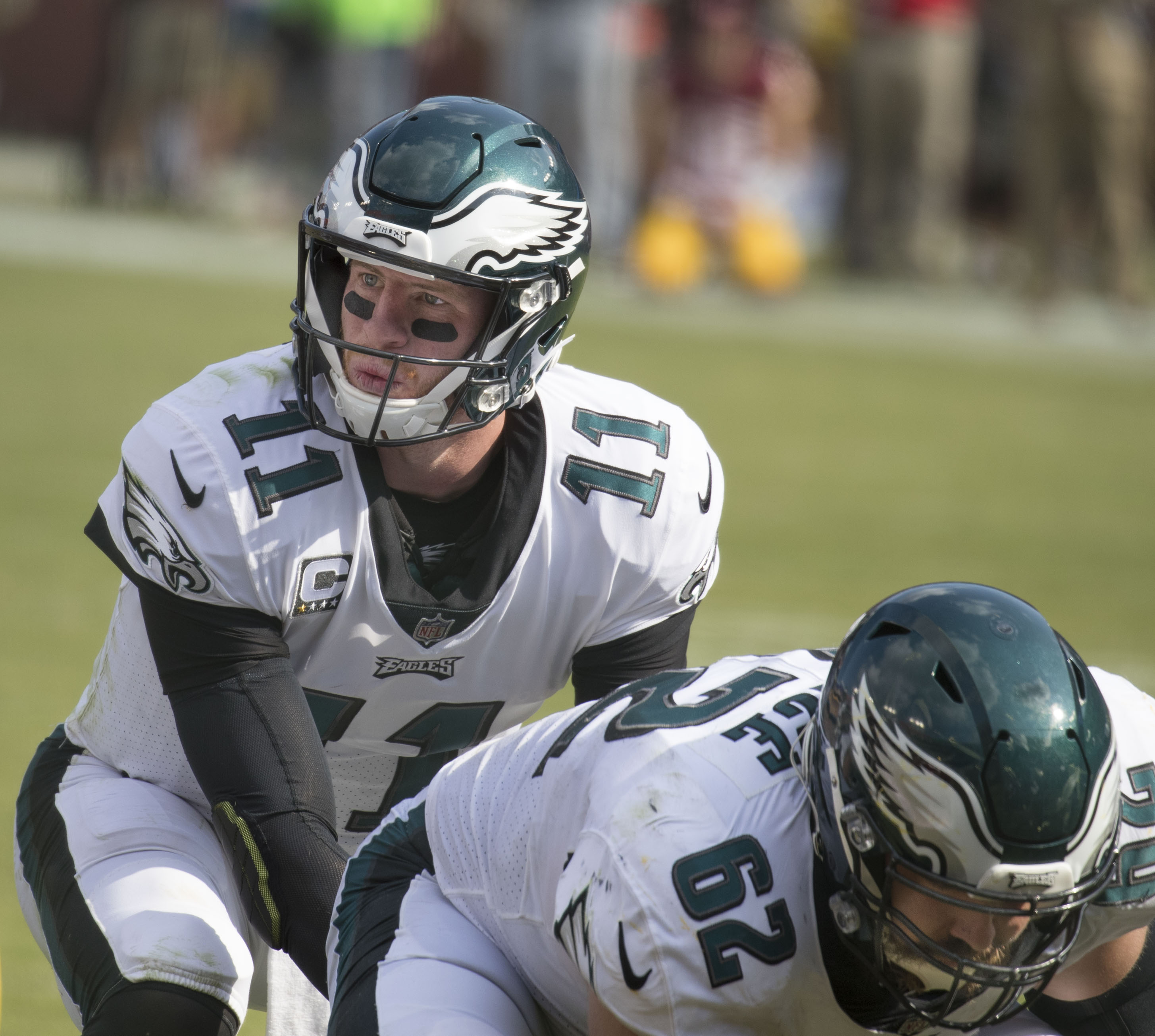
Kelce prepares to snap the ball to Eagles' quarterback Carson Wentz in a 2017 game against the Washington Redskins.

In 2017, Kelce started in all 16 games and had his best season as a professional. He was selected as a First-team All-Pro and was the highest rated offensive lineman by PFF. He also won Run Blocker of the Year by PFF. He won Super Bowl LII with the Eagles, defeating the New England Patriots 41–33. During the Eagles' Super Bowl parade on February 8, 2018, Kelce garnered national attention after giving an impassioned speech where he defended his teammates, coaches, and front office and compared Eagles fans to hungry dogs who "for 52 years have been starved of this championship," while dressed as a mummer. In 2018, Kelce was given his second First-team All-Pro honor.

On March 2, 2019, Kelce signed a one-year contract extension with the Eagles through the 2021 season. During the 2019 season, Kelce was elected to his third Pro Bowl and received his third straight First-team All-Pro Honor. In 2020, Kelce started his 100th straight game with the Eagles. The offensive line saw a franchise-record 14 different starting combinations, but Kelce was the lone man to start every game. He was elected to his 4th Pro Bowl, and was one of the eight finalists for the Art Rooney Award in 2020.

On March 5, 2021, Kelce signed a new deal with the Philadelphia Eagles. He was placed on the COVID list on January 3, 2022, and activated four days later, allowing him to keep his consecutive starts streak alive. He went in for the team's first offensive snap then was benched for the rest of the game. In 2021, Kelce was selected to his fifth Pro Bowl, marking his third straight selection, and was the Eagles finalist for the Walter Payton Man of the Year Award. He was also named a first-team All-Pro by the Associated Press for the fourth time in his career. He was ranked 71st by his fellow players on the NFL Top 100 Players of 2022. On March 11, 2022, after mulling retirement before the 2022 offseason, Kelce signed a new one-year deal with the Eagles worth $14 million, which made him the highest paid center in the NFL. Kelce earned Pro Bowl and first team All-Pro honors for the 2022 season.

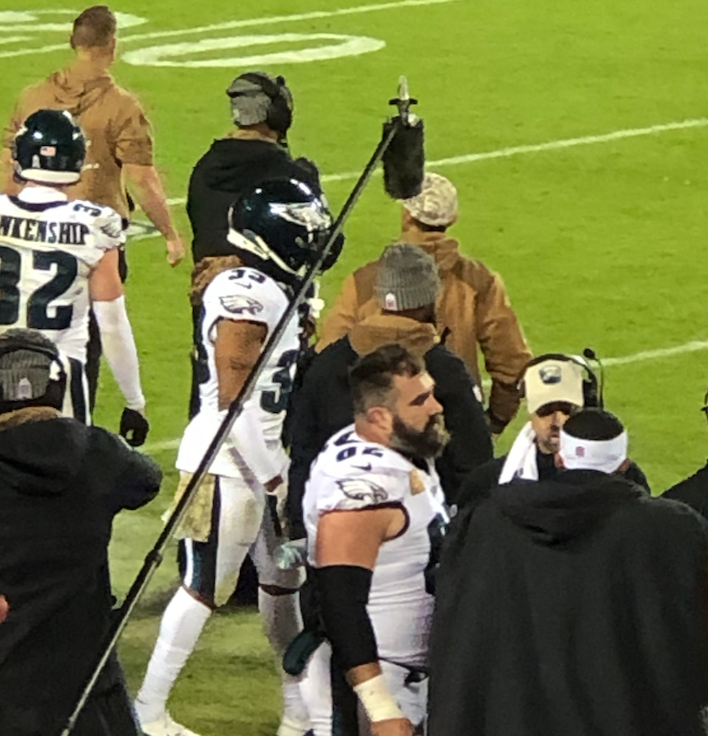
Kelce on the sideline with Eagles teammates, 2023

Kelce appeared in his second Super Bowl with Super Bowl LVII against the Kansas City Chiefs. Kelce's brother, Travis, played for the Chiefs, making it the first Super Bowl to feature two brothers on opposing teams as players. The Eagles would lose the game 38–35. After considering retirement, Kelce re-signed with the Eagles on a one-year contract on March 15, 2023. In Week 6, Kelce broke the Eagles record for most consecutive starts that was previously held by Jon Runyan. He received his third consecutive Pro Bowl selection and First Team All-Pro honors that year as well. Kelce ended the season starting all 17 regular season games as the Eagles finished with a record of 11–6 and earned a playoff berth. He and the Eagles ended their season with a 32–9 loss to the Tampa Bay Buccaneers in the NFC Wild Card playoff game.

Kelce announced his retirement on March 4, 2024. During his career, Kelce was named to seven total Pro Bowls and six first-team All Pros, making him one of the most decorated offensive linemen in NFL history. All six of his All-Pro selections were accomplished in his 30s, giving him the most All-Pro selections of any player in their 30s. He is one of just two centers in league history to make both the Pro Bowl and be named an All-Pro in three consecutive seasons along with Dwight Stephenson of the Miami Dolphins.

== Awards and honors ==
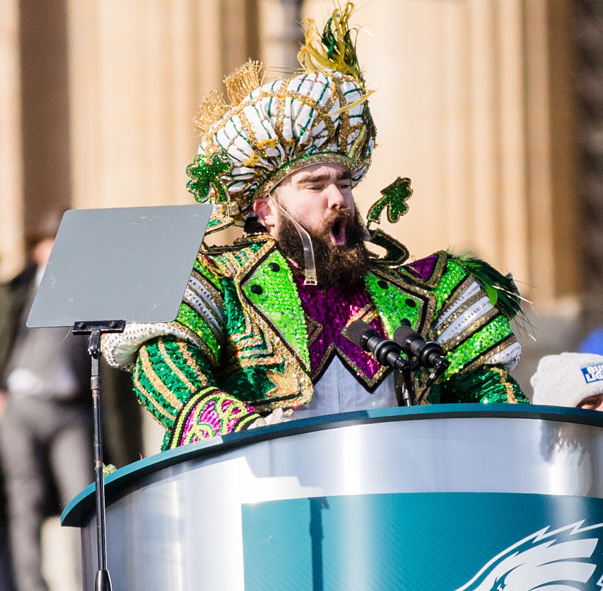
Kelce, dressed as a mummer, gives a speech at the Eagles' Super Bowl LII victory parade.

=== NFL ===
- Super Bowl champion (LII)
- 6× First-team All-Pro (2017–2019, 2021–2023)
- 7× Pro Bowl (2014, 2016, 2019–2023)
- PFWA Good Guy Award (2023)
- Built Ford Tough Offensive Line of the Year (2017)
- 5× NFL Top 100 — 72nd (2019), 94th (2020), 92nd (2021), 71st (2022), 37th (2023)

=== College ===
- 2× Second-team All-Big East (2009, 2010)

== Other ventures ==
Along with then-teammate Beau Allen, Kelce appeared in the Super Bowl LII-themed two-part episodes of It's Always Sunny in Philadelphia, "Charlie's Home Alone" and "The Gang Wins the Big Game" as Charlie Kelly's blood-loss hallucination. On March 4, 2023, Jason appeared on Saturday Night Live (SNL) when Travis was that episode's host, and appeared as both an audience member with his parents and in a sketch with his brother and SNL cast members Heidi Gardner and Chloe Fineman.

In September 2022, Kelce and his brother, Travis, launched a weekly podcast called New Heights. In the podcast, they discuss the NFL as well as each other's games. The show also features occasional guest stars. In November 2024, Apple announced that New Heights was the 8th most popular podcast show on Apple Podcasts in 2024.

During the 2022 NFL season, Philadelphia-based studio 9.14 Pictures filmed and produced the feature-length documentary Kelce, examining Kelce's football career and private life. The documentary was released on Amazon Prime Video on September 11, 2023. Within 24 hours of its release, Kelce became the No. 1 most watched movie on Prime Video in the United States. On November 9, 2023, Kelce joined Al Michaels and Kirk Herbstreit in the commentary booth during the live broadcast of the Week 10 NFL game between the Chicago Bears and the Carolina Panthers on Thursday Night Football, broadcast on Prime Video.

Along with Eagles teammates Lane Johnson and Jordan Mailata, Kelce formed the vocal group The Philly Specials and collaborated on the Christmas album A Philly Special Christmas, which was released in December 2022. A sequel, A Philly Special Christmas Special, was released in December 2023. A third and final album, A Philly Special Christmas Party, was released in December 2024.

On April 6, 2024, Kelce and former Eagles teammate Lane Johnson (wearing Luchador masks) participated in WrestleMania XL, helping Rey Mysterio and Andrade win their match. The event was held in Philadelphia at Lincoln Financial Field.

On April 29, 2024, it was announced that Kelce would join ESPN's Monday Night Countdown.

In June 2024, Kelce joined forces with his brother Travis to become significant owners and operators of the light beer company Garage Beer.

On November 21, 2024, while a guest on Jimmy Kimmel Live!, Kelce announced he would host a late-night sports talk show on ESPN called They Call It Late Night with Jason Kelce. The show debuted on January 4, 2025.

In 2026, Kelce joined the pit crew for Hendrick Motorsports in the NASCAR O'Reilly Auto Parts Series No. 17 for Corey Day at the 2026 Ag-Pro 300 at Talladega Superspeedway, where his team ended up winning the race. It stemmed from a series where his YouTube channel takes on other sports.

In October 2026, Kelce, alongside former teammate Beau Allen played in an amateur rugby game in London for Old Streetonians in a 30-minute friendly against Hackney RFC. The game followed a coaching session from former Harlequins and England prop Joe Marler and former USA Eagles centre Ilona Maher.

== Personal life ==
Kelce is the elder son of Ed and Donna Kelce and brother of Chiefs tight end Travis Kelce. Ed Kelce was a sales representative in the steel business. Donna Kelce has a master's degree, and has worked in banking at Mastercard, and then with banks building housing for the less fortunate using low-income tax credits. Donna Kelce is known for attending both of her sons' games and is often seen wearing a two-sided jersey featuring both of their numbers. She traveled from Tampa to Kansas City to attend both of her sons' Wild Card round games on January 16, 2022.

Kelce met his wife, Kylie McDevitt, on Tinder. They were married on April 14, 2018. They have four daughters, born in October 2019, March 2021, February 2023, and March 2025. Kylie was 38 weeks pregnant with their third child at the time of Super Bowl LVII.

In 2023, Kelce was a finalist in People's "Sexiest Man Alive" list.

During the 2021 offseason, Travis Kelce said their immediate family pronounces their last name /ˈkɛlsi/ KEL-see because that is the way their father pronounces it, although the rest of the paternal side of the family pronounces it /kɛls/ KELSS. Jason elaborated that their father "at some point ... got tired of correcting everyone calling him 'Kell-see.' ... And now I think we're both at the point where we're riding with Ed 'Kell-see.'"

== Filmography ==
=== Film ===
Year	Title	Role	Notes	Ref.
2023	Kelce	Self		

=== Television ===
Year	Title	Role	Notes	Ref.
2018	It's Always Sunny in Philadelphia	Self	Season 13 (Episodes 8 and 9)	
2023	Saturday Night Live	Self		
2024	Abbott Elementary	Self		
2024	Jeopardy!	Self	Clue giver	
2024	Jeopardy! Masters	Self	Clue giver	
2024	Jimmy Kimmel Live!	Self		
2025	They Call It Late Night with Jason Kelce	Self		
2026	A Course Called Ireland		Episode 6: "Leave Me Right Here"	
