= NFL Top 100 Players of 2022 =

NFL Players List

- Season 2022
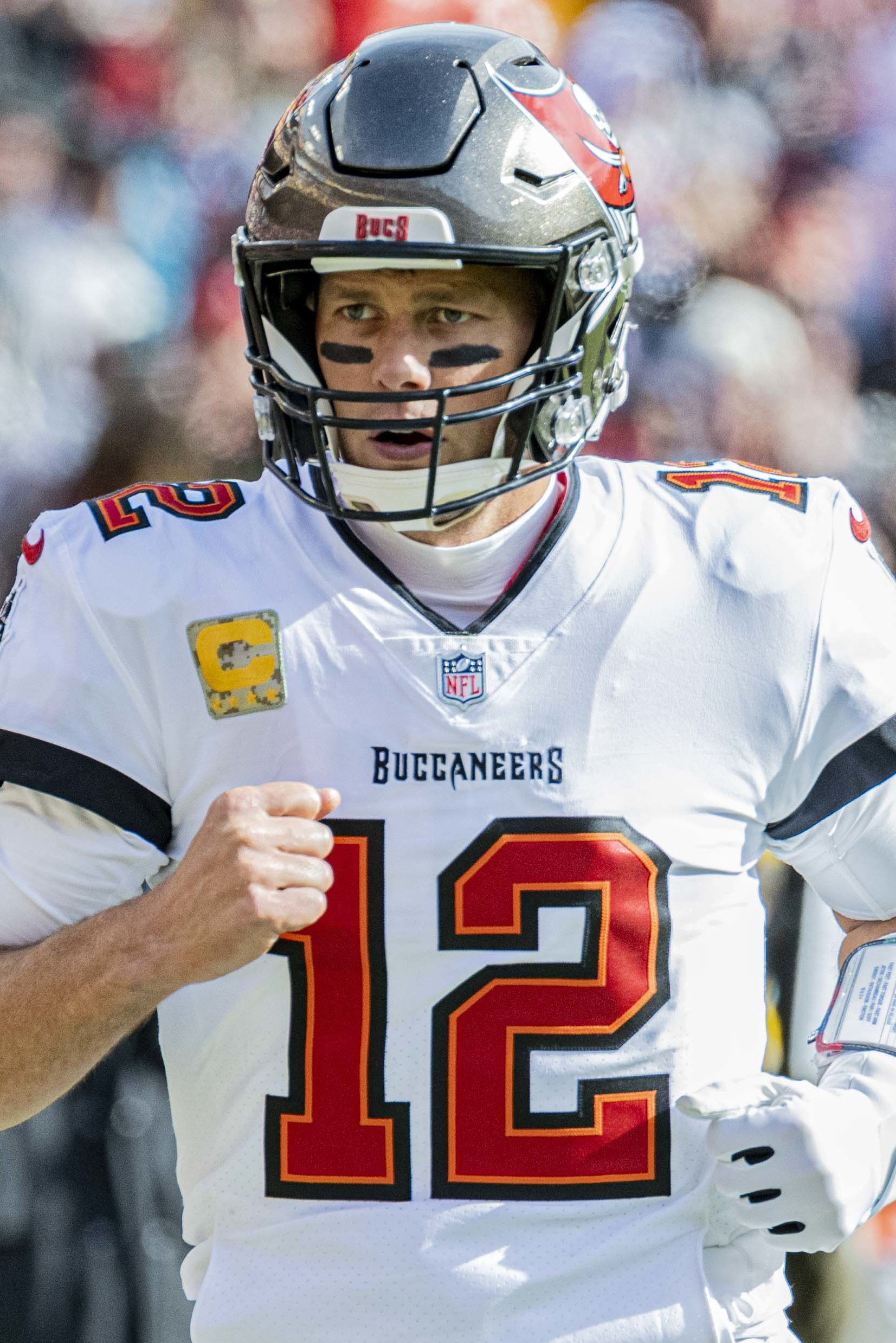
- Tom Brady, the number 1 ranked player

Release
- Original network: NFL Network
- Original release: August 14 – August 28, 2022

Season chronology
- ← Previous; 2021 Next → 2023

The NFL Top 100 Players of 2022 is the twelfth season in the NFL Top 100 series. It premiered on August 14, 2022 and concluded on August 28, 2022. Tampa Bay Buccaneers quarterback Tom Brady was the number one player for the fourth and final time. Four teams failed to have a player on the list: Detroit Lions, Houston Texans, Jacksonville Jaguars, New York Jets.

== Episode list ==
Episode No.	Air date	Numbers revealed
1	August 14	100–91
2	August 14	90–81
3	August 14	80–71
4	August 14	70–61
5	August 14	60–51
6	August 21	50–41
7	August 21	40–31
8	August 21	30–21
9	August 28	20–11
10	August 28	10–6
11	August 28	5–1

== The list ==
Rank	Player	Position	2021 team	2022 team	Rank change	Reference	Year accomplishments
1	Tom Brady	Quarterback	Tampa Bay Buccaneers		▲6		3rd Second-team All-Pro selection; 15th Pro Bowl; 5,316 yards passing; 43 TD passes; rushed for 2 TDs & 81 yards on 28 carries
2	Aaron Donald	Defensive tackle	Los Angeles Rams		0		Super Bowl champion; 7th First-team All-Pro selection; 8th Pro Bowl; 84 tackles; 12 1/2 sacks; 4 passes defensed; 4 forced fumbles
3	Aaron Rodgers	Quarterback	Green Bay Packers		0		NFL MVP (4th time in career); 4th First-team All-Pro selection; 10th Pro Bowl; 4,115 yards passing; 37 TD passes; rushed for 101 yards & 3 TDs on 33 carries
4	Cooper Kupp	Wide receiver	Los Angeles Rams		NR		Super Bowl champion; Super Bowl MVP; NFL Offensive Player of the Year; First-team All-Pro; 1st Pro Bowl; 145 receptions; 1,947 yards receiving; 16 TD receptions
5	Jonathan Taylor	Running back	Indianapolis Colts		NR		First-team All-Pro; 1st Pro Bowl; 1,811 yards rushing; 18 rushing TDs; 40 receptions for 360 yards & 2 TDs
6	T. J. Watt	Outside linebacker	Pittsburgh Steelers		▲3		NFL Defensive Player of the Year; 3rd First-team All-Pro selection; 4th Pro Bowl; 64 tackles; 22 1/2 sacks (tied single-season record); 7 passes defensed; 5 forced fumbles; 3 fumbles recovered
7	Davante Adams	Wide receiver	Green Bay Packers	Las Vegas Raiders	▼1		2nd First-team All-Pro selection; 5th Pro Bowl; 123 receptions; 1,553 yards receiving; 11 TD receptions
8	Patrick Mahomes	Quarterback	Kansas City Chiefs		▼7		4th Pro Bowl; 4,839 yards passing; 37 TD passes; rushed for 381 yards and 2 TDs on 66 carries
9	Jalen Ramsey	Cornerback	Los Angeles Rams		▲4		Super Bowl champion; 3rd First-team All-Pro selection; 5th Pro Bowl; 77 tackles; 4 interceptions; 1 forced fumble; 1 fumble recovered
10	Travis Kelce	Tight end	Kansas City Chiefs		▼5		3rd Second-team All-Pro selection; 7th Pro Bowl; 92 receptions; 1,125 yards receiving; 9 TD receptions; rushed for 3 yards and 1 TD on 2 carries
11	Myles Garrett	Defensive end	Cleveland Browns		▲5		2nd First-team All-Pro selection; 3rd Pro Bowl selection; 51 tackles; 16 sacks; forced fumble, recovered fumble & scored TD off fumble in one single play
12	Derrick Henry	Running back	Tennessee Titans		▼8		937 yards rushing; 10 rushing TDs
13	Josh Allen	Quarterback	Buffalo Bills		▼3		4,407 yards passing; 36 TD passes; 6 rushing TDs
14	Trent Williams	Offensive tackle	San Francisco 49ers		▲28		First-team All-Pro; 9th Pro Bowl selection
15	Tyreek Hill	Wide receiver	Kansas City Chiefs	Miami Dolphins	0		6th Pro Bowl; 111 receptions; 1,239 yards receiving; 9 TD receptions
16	Micah Parsons	Linebacker	Dallas Cowboys		NR		NFL Defensive Rookie of the Year; First-team All-Pro; 1st Pro Bowl; PFWA All-Rookie Team; 84 tackles; 13 sacks; 3 forced fumbles; 3 passes defensed
17	Justin Jefferson	Wide receiver	Minnesota Vikings		▲36		2nd Second-team All-Pro selection; 2nd Pro Bowl; 108 receptions; 1,616 yards receiving; 10 TD receptions
18	Darius Shaquille Leonard	Linebacker	Indianapolis Colts		▲19		3rd First-team All-Pro selection; 3rd Pro Bowl; 122 tackles; 8 passes defensed; 4 interceptions; 8 forced fumbles (league leader); 3 fumbles recovered
19	Deebo Samuel	Wide receiver	San Francisco 49ers		NR		First-team All-Pro; 1st Pro Bowl selection; 77 receptions; 1,405 yards receiving; 6 TD receptions; 365 yards rushing; 8 rushing TDs
20	J. C. Jackson	Cornerback	New England Patriots	Los Angeles Chargers	▲29		2nd-Team All-Pro; Pro Bowl; 58 tackles; 8 interceptions, including 1 for TD; 1 forced fumble
21	Joe Burrow	Quarterback	Cincinnati Bengals		NR		Comeback Player of the Year; 4,611 yards passing; 34 TD passes
22	George Kittle	Tight end	San Francisco 49ers		▲28		3rd Pro Bowl selection; 71 receptions; 910 yards receiving; 6 TD receptions
23	Trevon Diggs	Cornerback	Dallas Cowboys		NR		First-team All-Pro; Pro Bowl; NFL-leading 11 interceptions, including 2 for TDs
24	Ja'Marr Chase	Wide receiver	Cincinnati Bengals		NR		Offensive Rookie of the Year; Second-team All-Pro; Pro Bowl; 81 receptions; 1,455 yards receiving; 13 TD receptions
25	Nick Bosa	Defensive end	San Francisco 49ers		NR		2nd Pro Bowl; 52 tackles; 15 1/2 sacks; 1 pass defensed; 4 forced fumbles
26	Stefon Diggs	Wide receiver	Buffalo Bills		▼15		2nd Pro Bowl; 1,225 yards receiving; 10 TD receptions
27	Matthew Stafford	Quarterback	Los Angeles Rams		NR		Super Bowl LVI Champion; 4,886 yards passing; 41 TD passes; 43 yards rushing
28	Quenton Nelson	Guard	Indianapolis Colts		▲5		Second-team All-Pro
29	Bobby Wagner	Middle linebacker	Seattle Seahawks	Los Angeles Rams	▼4		2nd Second-team All-Pro selection; 8th Pro Bowl; 170 tackles; 1 sack; 5 passes defensed; 1 interception
30	Joey Bosa	Defensive end	Los Angeles Chargers		▲2		4th Pro Bowl; 51 tackles; 10 1/2 sacks; 7 forced fumbles
31	Dalvin Cook	Running back	Minnesota Vikings		▼11		3rd Pro Bowl; 1,159 yards rushing; 6 rushing TDs; 34 receptions; 224 yards receiving
32	Mark Andrews	Tight end	Baltimore Ravens		NR		First-team All-Pro Team; 2nd Pro Bowl; 107 receptions; 1,361 yards receiving; 9 TD receptions
33	Nick Chubb	Running back	Cleveland Browns		▼7		First-team PFWA All-Pro; 3rd Pro Bowl; 1,259 yards rushing; 8 rushing TDs; 20 receptions; 174 yards receiving; 1 TD reception
34	Kevin Byard	Safety	Tennessee Titans		NR		2nd First-team All-Pro selection; 2nd Pro Bowl; 88 tackles; 13 passes defensed; 5 interceptions, including 1 for TD; 2 forced fumbles; Fumble recovered for TD
35	Keenan Allen	Wide receiver	Los Angeles Chargers		▲20		5th Pro Bowl; 106 receptions; 1,138 yards receiving; 6 TD receptions
36	Lamar Jackson	Quarterback	Baltimore Ravens		▼12		2nd Pro Bowl; 2,882 yards passing; 16 TD passes; 767 yards rushing; 2 rushing TDs
37	DeAndre Hopkins	Wide receiver	Arizona Cardinals		▼29		42 receptions; 572 yards receiving; 8 TD receptions
38	Joe Mixon	Running back	Cincinnati Bengals		NR		1st Pro Bowl; 1,205 yards rushing; 13 rushing TDs; 42 receptions; 314 yards receiving; 3 TD receptions
39	Chris Jones	Defensive tackle	Kansas City Chiefs		▼5		3rd Second-team All-Pro selection; 3rd Pro Bowl; 27 tackles; 9 sacks; 5 passes defensed; 1 forced fumble; 1 fumble recovered
40	Justin Herbert	Quarterback	Los Angeles Chargers		▲16		1st Pro Bowl selection; 5,014 yards passing; 38 TD passes
41	Tristan Wirfs	Offensive tackle	Tampa Bay Buccaneers		▲48		First-team All-Pro; 1st Pro Bowl
42	Cameron Heyward	Defensive tackle	Pittsburgh Steelers		▲15		3rd First-team All-Pro selection; 89 tackles; 10 sacks; 1 Fumble recovered; 1 Interception
43	Derwin James	Strong safety	Los Angeles Chargers		NR		2nd First-team All-Pro selection; 2nd Pro Bowl; 118 tackles; 2 sacks; 2 interceptions
44	Dak Prescott	Quarterback	Dallas Cowboys		NR		4,449 yards passing; 37 TD passes; 1 rushing TD
45	Jordan Poyer	Strong safety	Buffalo Bills		NR		First-team All-Pro; 93 tackles; 3 sacks; 4 passes defensed; 5 interceptions
46	Austin Ekeler	Running back	Los Angeles Chargers		NR		911 yards rushing; 12 rushing TDs; 8 TD receptions
47	Fred Warner	Middle linebacker	San Francisco 49ers		▼26		137 tackles & 1/2 sack; 4 Passes defensed; 1 Forced fumble; 3 Fumbles recovered
48	Robert Quinn	Defensive end	Chicago Bears	Chicago Bears / Philadelphia Eagles	NR		Second-team All-Pro; 3rd Pro Bowl; 49 tackles; 18 1/2 sacks; 4 Forced fumbles
49	De'Vondre Campbell	Linebacker	Green Bay Packers		NR		First-team All-Pro; 146 tackles; 2 sacks; 2 Interceptions
50	Micah Hyde	Free safety	Buffalo Bills		NR		2nd Second-team All-Pro selection; 74 tackles; 1 sack; 5 Interceptions, including 1 for TD
51	Alvin Kamara	Running back	New Orleans Saints		▼37		Selected to 5th Pro Bowl; Rushed for 898 yards & 4 TDs; Caught 47 passes for 439 yards & 5 TDs; Returned 3 kicks for 29 yards
52	Matthew Judon	Linebacker	New England Patriots		NR		Selected to 3rd Pro Bowl; Recorded 60 tackles & 12 1/2 sacks; Recovered 1 fumble; Defensed 1 pass
53	Mike Evans	Wide receiver	Tampa Bay Buccaneers		▼5		Selected to 4th Pro Bowl; Caught 74 passes for 1,035 yards and 14 TDs; Rushed for 10 yards
54	Jeffery Simmons	Defensive tackle	Tennessee Titans		▲24		Selected 2nd-Team All-Pro; Selected to 1st Pro Bowl; Recorded 54 tackles & 8 1/2 sacks; Defensed 6 passes
55	Joel Bitonio	Guard	Cleveland Browns		NR		Selected 1st-Team All-Pro; Selected to 4th Pro Bowl
56	Xavien Howard	Cornerback	Miami Dolphins		▼39		Selected to 3rd Pro Bowl; Recorded 50 tackles & 1 sack; Recorded 5 interceptions, including 1 for TD; Forced 2 fumbles & recovered 2 more, including 1 for TD
57	Kyler Murray	Quarterback	Arizona Cardinals		▼18		Selected to 2nd Pro Bowl; Threw for 3,787 yards & 24 TDs; Rushed for 423 yards & 5 TDs
58	Darren Waller	Tight end	Las Vegas Raiders		▼23		Caught 55 passes for 665 yards & 2 TDs
59	Maxx Crosby	Defensive end	Las Vegas Raiders		NR		Selected 2nd-Team All-Pro; Selected to 1st Pro Bowl; Selected to PFWA All-AFC Team; Recorded 56 tackles & 8 sacks; Defensed 7 passes
60	Corey Linsley	Center	Los Angeles Chargers		0		Selected to 1st Second-team All-Pro; Selected to 1st Pro Bowl
61	Russell Wilson	Quarterback	Seattle Seahawks	Denver Broncos	▼49		Selected to 9th Pro Bowl; Threw for 3,113 yards & 25 TDs; Rushed for 50 yards
62	Chandler Jones	Defensive end	Arizona Cardinals	Las Vegas Raiders	NR		Selected to 4th Pro Bowl; Recorded 41 tackles & 10 1/2 sacks; Forced 6 fumbles & recovered 1 more; Defensed 4 passes
63	Jaylen Waddle	Wide receiver	Miami Dolphins		NR		Caught 104 passes for 1,015 yards & 6 TDs; Rushed for 3 yards & 1 TD
64	Devin White	Linebacker	Tampa Bay Buccaneers		▼36		Selected to 1st Pro Bowl; Recorded 128 tackles & 3 1/2 sacks; Defensed 3 passes; Recovered 1 fumble
65	Derek Carr	Quarterback	Las Vegas Raiders		NR		Threw for 4,804 yards and 23 TDs
66	DeForest Buckner	Defensive tackle	Indianapolis Colts		▼39		Selected to 2nd Pro Bowl; Recorded 68 tackles & 7 sacks; Defensed 3 passes
67	Budda Baker	Safety	Arizona Cardinals		▼48		Selected 2nd-Team All-Pro; Selected to 4th Pro Bowl; Recorded 98 tackles & 2 sacks; Defensed 7 passes; Recorded 3 interceptions
68	Zack Martin	Guard	Dallas Cowboys		▲17		Selected to 5th First-team All-Pro; Selected to 7th Pro Bowl
69	Cameron Jordan	Defensive end	New Orleans Saints		▼23		Selected to 7th Pro Bowl; Recorded 59 tackles & 12 1/2 sacks; Forced 2 fumbles; Defensed 6 passes
70	Tyrann Mathieu	Safety	Kansas City Chiefs	New Orleans Saints	▼12		Selected to 3rd Pro Bowl; Recorded 76 tackles & 1 sack; Recorded 3 interceptions, including 1 for TD; Recovered 3 fumbles
71	Jason Kelce	Center	Philadelphia Eagles		▲21		Selected to 4th First-team All-Pro Team; Selected to 5th Pro Bowl
72	Quandre Diggs	Free safety	Seattle Seahawks		▲5		Selected to 2nd Pro Bowl; Recorded 94 tackles; Recorded 5 interceptions
73	Cordarrelle Patterson	Running back	Atlanta Falcons		NR		Caught 52 passes for 548 yards & 5 TDs; Rushed for 618 yards & 6 TDs; Returned 18 kicks for 434 yards
74	Demario Davis	Inside linebacker	New Orleans Saints		▼10		Selected to second 2nd-Team All-Pro; Won Bart Starr Award; Recorded 105 tackles & 3 sacks
75	Antoine Winfield Jr.	Free safety	Tampa Bay Buccaneers		NR		Selected to 1st Pro Bowl; Recorded 88 tackles & 2 sacks; Recorded 2 interceptions; Forced 2 fumbles & recovered 3 more
76	Brian Burns	Defensive end	Carolina Panthers		NR		Selected to 1st Pro Bowl; Recorded 50 tackles & 9 sacks; Defensed 4 passes; Forced 2 fumbles
77	Darius Slay	Cornerback	Philadelphia Eagles		NR		Selected to 4th Pro Bowl; Recorded 52 tackles; Defensed 9 passes; Recorded 3 interceptions, including 1 for TD; Recovered 2 fumbles, both returned for TDs
78	Trey Hendrickson	Defensive end	Cincinnati Bengals		▼5		Selected to 1st Pro Bowl; Recorded 34 tackles & 14 sacks; Forced 3 fumbles
79	Rashawn Slater	Offensive tackle	Los Angeles Chargers		NR		Named 2nd-Team All-Pro; Selected to 1st Pro Bowl
80	James Conner	Running back	Arizona Cardinals		NR		Named to 2nd Pro Bowl; Rushed for 752 yards and 15 TDs; Caught 37 passes for 375 yards & 3 TDs
81	Justin Simmons	Free safety	Denver Broncos		▼36		Named to second 2nd-Team All-Pro Team; Recorded 80 tackles & 1 1/2 sacks; Recorded 5 interceptions
82	Kenny Moore II	Cornerback	Indianapolis Colts		NR		Selected to 1st Pro Bowl; Recorded 102 tackles & 1 sack; Recorded 4 interceptions & forced 1 fumble
83	Wyatt Teller	Guard	Cleveland Browns		NR		Selected to Second 2nd-Team All-Pro Team; Selected to 1st Pro Bowl
84	Roquan Smith	Inside linebacker	Chicago Bears	Chicago Bears / Baltimore Ravens	NR		Named to second 2nd-Team All-Pro Team; Recorded 163 tackles & 3 sacks; Recorded 1st career interception, which was returned for TD
85	Mac Jones	Quarterback	New England Patriots		NR		Selected to 1st Pro Bowl; Named to PFWA All-Rookie Team; Threw for 3,801 yards & 22 TDs
86	Shaquil Barrett	Outside linebacker	Tampa Bay Buccaneers		▲2		Selected to 2nd Pro Bowl; Recorded 51 tackles & 10 sacks; Recorded 1 interception; Forced 3 fumbles & recovered 2 more
87	Denzel Ward	Cornerback	Cleveland Browns		NR		Selected to 2nd Pro Bowl; Recorded 43 tackles & 1/2 sack; Recorded 3 interceptions, including 1 for touchdown
88	Jonathan Allen	Defensive tackle	Washington Commanders		NR		Selected to 1st Pro Bowl; Recorded 62 tackles & 9 sacks
89	Marshon Lattimore	Cornerback	New Orleans Saints		▼3		Selected to 4th Pro Bowl; Recorded 68 tackles; Recorded 3 interceptions; Recovered 1 fumble
90	Odell Beckham Jr.	Wide receiver	Cleveland Browns / Los Angeles Rams	Free Agent	NR		Super Bowl LVI champion; Caught 44 passes for 537 yards and 5 TDs
91	Kyle Pitts	Tight end	Atlanta Falcons		NR		Selected to 1st Pro Bowl; Named to PFWA All-Rookie Team; Caught 68 passes for 1,026 yards & 1 TD
92	Tyron Smith	Offensive tackle	Dallas Cowboys		NR		Selected to 8th Pro Bowl
93	Von Miller	Linebacker	Denver Broncos / Los Angeles Rams	Buffalo Bills	NR		Recorded 50 tackles & 9 1/2 sacks
94	Justin Tucker	Placekicker	Baltimore Ravens		NR		5th First-team All-Pro selection; 5th Pro Bowl selection; Kicked Record 66-yard game-winning field goal
95	CeeDee Lamb	Wide receiver	Dallas Cowboys		NR		Selected to 1st Pro Bowl; Caught 79 passes for 1,102 yards and 6 TDs
96	Jimmie Ward	Free safety	San Francisco 49ers		NR		Recorded 77 tackles; Recorded 2 interceptions, including 1 for touchdown
97	Leonard Williams	Defensive end	New York Giants		▼13		Recorded 81 tackles & 6 1/2 sacks
98	David Montgomery	Running back	Chicago Bears		NR		Ran for 849 yards and 7 TDs
99	Kirk Cousins	Quarterback	Minnesota Vikings		NR		Selected to 3rd Pro Bowl; Threw for 4,221 yards and 33 TDs
100	Kyle Juszczyk	Fullback	San Francisco 49ers		▼3		22 yards & 1 TD on 8 carries

=== Sources ===
- 2022 Pro Bowl rosters:
- 2021 All-Pro Team:
- PFWA All-Rookie Team:

== Reception ==
Andrew Whitworth, former Tackle for the Los Angeles Rams, criticized the list and its voting process, calling it a "joke" and "content filler". Kyle Shanahan, coach of the San Francisco 49ers, said that he doesn't pay attention to it. Myles Garrett, All-Pro defensive end for the Cleveland Browns, said that he should be ranked first, but also noted that he does not vote.
