= Garage Beer =

Lager by Braxton Brewing Company

- Type: American lager
- Manufacturer: Founders Brewing Co.
- Origin: United States
- Introduced: 2018; 8 years ago Covington, Kentucky
- Alcohol by volume: 4%, U.S.
- Website: drinkgaragebeer.com

Garage Beer is an American-style light lager brand that was originally created by Braxton Brewing Company in 2018 before becoming an independent company in 2023. Garage Beer is available in Classic and Lime flavors and contains 4% alcohol by volume, 95 calories, and 3 grams of carbohydrates per 12-ounce serving.

In June 2024, Travis Kelce and Jason Kelce became Garage Beer's largest individual investors and co-owners of the beer brand alongside CEO Andy Sauer. As of September 2025 the beer company is valued at US$200 million. As of July 2026, Garage Beer is the fastest growing light lager in the United States.

In June, 2025 it was announced that Garage Beer had bought a stake in TAL team, the St. Joseph Goats. On July 27, 2026, it was announced that restaurant chain Red Robin had partnered with Garage Beer, making it the first national restaurant chain to serve the brand's light lager.
