= Donna Kelce =

American public figure (born 1952)

- Born: Donna Blalock; October 9, 1952 (age 74); Cleveland, Ohio, U.S.
- Education: Ohio University (BA); Baldwin Wallace University (MBA)
- Occupation: Bank executive
- Spouse: Ed Kelce (m. 1979; div. 2015)
- Children: Jason; Travis
- Relatives: Kylie Kelce (daughter-in-law); Taylor Swift (daughter-in-law)

Donna Kelce (née Blalock; born October 9, 1952) is an American former bank executive. Her sons are National Football League players Jason Kelce and Travis Kelce. In addition to raising them, she has been involved in charitable initiatives and appeared in media roles, including acting in Hallmark Channel films and being named one of Glamour's women of the year in 2024. She appeared as the ‘Secret Traitor’ in the fourth season of ‘The Traitors’ US.

== Early life and education ==
Donna Kelce (née Blalock) was born on October 9, 1952, and raised in Cleveland. Her mother Marie Petranek's maternal grandparents, George Stajduhar and Mary Jurkovich, emigrated to the United States from Croatia. However, Donna's grandfather Frank Petranck, who was her mother's father, was born to Czech immigrants. Donna's paternal grandmother Helen Henrietta Sadlowski was born to Polish immigrants. Kelce was raised in a small house downtown with her grandparents living in the upstairs.

When Donna was 12, her mother died. The family, which included her father Donald Roy Blalock and younger brother Don, relocated from Cleveland to Moreland Hills, Ohio. Her father later remarried a woman named Mary, who played a key role in Kelce's upbringing. Kelce credited Mary with helping her and her brother maintain stability during their formative years. She remained an influential figure in Kelce's life until her death in 2023.

Although her father opposed women participating in sports, Kelce pursued track and field with the support of her stepmother. During high school, she competed in the Junior Olympics, where she competed in track and field events. Kelce became the first in her family to graduate from college, earning a degree in radio and television from Ohio University. She completed an M.B.A. at Baldwin Wallace University.

== Career ==
Kelce pursued a 30-year career in banking, working for Mastercard and later specializing in commercial real estate finance at a Cleveland-based bank. She has participated in charitable efforts connected to her public persona as the mother of Jason and Travis Kelce. In one initiative, mugs featuring her likeness and a recipe were sold to raise funds for student lunch debt relief. Kelce approved the project and supported its mission.

In 2024, Kelce appeared in two Hallmark Channel holiday films, Christmas on Call and Holiday Touchdown: A Chiefs Love Story. In the former, she portrayed the owner of a cheesesteak shop in Philadelphia, wearing an Eagles jersey with her son Jason Kelce's number. In the latter, she played the manager of a Kansas City barbecue restaurant while wearing a Chiefs jersey customized with a message from her son Travis Kelce. These marked her first acting roles, and Kelce described the experience as enjoyable and approached it with humor.

In 2024, Kelce was named one of Glamour's women of the year. The recognition highlighted her role as the mother of two professional football players and her reflections on motherhood, ambition, and perseverance.

In 2026, Kelce appeared as a contestant on season 4 of the American reality competition series The Traitors. Kelce was the second person "banished" and the first "traitor" of the season banished. Kelce was the "secret traitor", a player pulling strings of the game whose identity was not only concealed from the "faithfuls", but also the other traitors and the audience.

== Personal life ==
Donna met Ed Kelce at Fagan's, a bar in Cleveland. They married in the 1970s and remained together for twenty years before divorcing. They are the parents of Jason Kelce, who played as a center for the Philadelphia Eagles, and Travis Kelce, a tight end for the Kansas City Chiefs. In 2022, they became the first brothers to play against each other in a Super Bowl, an event that drew public attention to Kelce as their mother.

She has spoken about her experiences raising her sons, emphasizing the challenges of parenting and her efforts to instill responsibility and independence in them. Kelce also discussed her pride in their accomplishments and their grounded personalities despite their public success. As of 2024, she resides in Orlando, Florida.

== Filmography ==
Year	Title	Role	Notes
2024	Holiday Touchdown: A Chiefs Love Story	Barbecue shop manager	
2026	The Traitors	Contestant	Eliminated; 20th place
