= George Phang =

George Phang (born 29 March 1956 in Saint Andrew, Kingston) is a Jamaican reggae record producer, famously known for owning the Powerhouse label.

Phang started his reggae label Powerhouse in the early 1980s. His first hits were Little John's "True Confessions" and "Roots Girl", both released in 1983. He followed suit with Sugar Minott's "Buy off the Bar" and Barrington Levy's "Money Move" which were both major hits that year. In the summer of 1984 he released Michael Palmer's "Lick Shot" which became one of the biggest tunes that summer. Many of the most successful dancehall stars of the 1980s recorded for Phang. Half Pint's all-time greatest hit "Greetings" was released on Powerhouse in 1986. Conroy Smith's first song "Indian Lady" was also released on Phang's label.

Other Powerhouse artists include Josey Wales, Freddie McGregor, Nitty Gritty, Tenor Saw, Little John, Brigadier Jerry, Barrington Levy, Admiral Bailey, Al Campbell, Charlie Chaplin, Cutty Ranks, Dominic, Echo Minott, Frankie Paul, Gregory Isaacs, John Wayne, Yellowman, Super Cat , and General Echo. Phang mostly used riddims produced by Sly & Robbie, giving him a significant advantage over other producers. His sound is characterized by the abundant use of reverb on the snare drums.

In the late 1980s, he stopped producing music. Phang was a key influence on Philip "Fatis" Burrell's move into record production.

== Selected discography ==
- George Phang Presents Powerhouse Vol. 1 (2006) EMI/Front Line
