= Clint Eastwood (musician) =

Jamaican reggae musician

- Born: Robert Anthony Brammer
- Origin: Jamaica
- Genres: Reggae
- Instrument: Vocals

Clint Eastwood (born Robert Anthony Brammer) is a Jamaican reggae musician, who recorded as a solo artist in the late 1970s and early 1980s before teaming up with UK deejay General Saint as the duo Clint Eastwood & General Saint.

== Biography ==
The younger brother of Trinity, Brammer took the trend of adopting the names of characters from Spaghetti Westerns as stage names a step further by recording and performing under the name of one of the genre's most successful actors, Clint Eastwood. Eastwood recorded three albums in 1978 - African Youth and Step It in a Zion for producer Bunny Lee, and Death in the Arena for Channel One. Further albums followed in 1979 and 1980, including Sex Education for Greensleeves Records, Eastwood one of a group of deejays who led the move from 'cultural' chants to dancehall chat and 'slackness'. 1981 saw the release of a live album recorded with Dillinger and the start of a partnership with General Saint. The duo's first release, "Tribute to General Echo" remembered the recently killed slack deejay, and they would later hit the UK chart with their version of "Stop That Train". Both of the duo's albums made the top 5 of the UK Independent Chart.

== Albums ==
- African Youth (1978) Third World/Gorgon
- Death in the Arena (1978) Cha Cha
- Step It in a Zion (1978) Live & Love
- Jah Lights Shining (1979) Jamaica Sound
- Love & Happiness (1979) Burning Vibrations
- Clint Eastwood (Jamaica Sun) (1980) Amo
- Sex Education (1980) Greensleeves
- Live at London (1981) Vista (Dillinger & Clint Eastwood)
- Two Bad D.J. (1981) Greensleeves (Clint Eastwood & General Saint)
- Stop That Train (1983) Greensleeves (Clint Eastwood & General Saint)
- BBC Radio 1 In Concert (199?) Windsong (Clint Eastwood & General Saint)
- The Best of Clint Eastwood (1984) Culture Press
- The Real Clint Eastwood (199?) Culture Press/Lagoon
