= Culture Press =

British record label

Culture Press is an independent record label from UK specialized in Jamaican music.

It was founded in 1984 in UK by Enzo Hamilton with Webster Shrowder and was relocated, in 1987, to Paris, France.

== LP Discography ==
- VSLP5000 – Bob Marley – Interviews
- VSLP5001 – Clint Eastwood – The Best of Clint Eastwood – 1984
- VSLP5002 – Dillinger – Blackboard Jungle – 1984
- VSLP5003 – David Isaacs – Place in the Sun – 1984
- VSLP5004 – Max Romeo Meets Owen Gray At King Tubby's Studio – 1984
- VSLP5005 – U Brown – Superstar – 1984
- VSLP5006 – Barry Brown – The Best of Barry Brown – 1984
- VSLP5007 – Cornell Campbell – Meets The Gaylads (With Sly And Robbie) – 1985
- VSLP5008 – Winston Jarrett – Rocking Vibration – 1984
- VSLP5009 – Horace Andy – The Best of Horace Andy – 1985
- VSLP5014 – Sly and Robbie Meet King Tubby – 1985
- VSLP5017 – Trinity – The Best of Trinity – 1984

== Incomplete CD Discography ==
- CP304 – The Cimarons – People Say
- CP305 – U Roy – Super Boss
- CP306 – Jacob Miller – With The Inner Circle Band & Augustus Pablo
- CP312 – Skatalites – Musical Communion: Duke Reid Sessions (2000)
- CP314 – Various – Jamaican Beat 1968–1973
- CP315 – Various – Top Rock Steady 1966–1971
- CP407 – Jackie Mittoo – Show Case
- CP502 – I Roy – Crisis Time (1976)
- CP503 – The Aggrovators – Meets The Revolutionaries at Channel One
- CP504 – Dillinger – Three Piece Suit
- CP506 – Clint Eastwood – Real Clint Eastwood
- CP512 – Tommy McCook – Show Case (with The Aggrovators) (1975)
- CP601 – Toyan – Ghetto Man Skank (1988)
- CP602 – Various – Midnight Rock Classics Vol 01 (1981–1982)
- CP603 – Triston Palma – Entertainment
- CP604 – Jah Thomas – Dance Hall Connection
- CP605 – Early B – Send in the Patient
- CP0301 – Black Uhuru – Love Dub (1990)
- CP0308 – Various – Jazz in Jamaica (2001)
- CP0505 – Augustus Pablo – Meets King Tubby in Roots Vibes
- CP0508 – Leroy Smart – Super Star (2001)
- CP0511 – Jackie Mittoo – Showcase (2001)
- CP0606 – Anthony Johnson – Reggae Feelings 1982–1984
- CP1014 – Bob Marley- Mr Chatterbox
- CP1034 – Bob Marley – Rock Steady & Early Reggae Sides (2001)
- CP3001 – I Roy – Sincerely Yours (Straight to the Heart & Sunshine For I)
- CP3002 – Gregory Isaacs – Cool Ruler (I'll Never Trust You Again & No Luck)
- CP3003 – Yellowman – Just Cool (Fantastic Yellowman & Saturday Night)
- CP3004 – Dillinger – Reble with a Cause (Funky Ounk & Killer Man Jaro
- CP3005 – Various – Bunny lee Meets King Tubby and The Aggrovators
- CP3009 – Dennis Brown – Here I Come Again 1971–1976
- CP3010 – Bad Manners – Best Baddest & Ugliest
- CP3012 – Johnny Osbourne – Dancing Time (2000)
- CP3011 – Desmond Dekker – Action (2000)
- CP3014 – Heptones – Heptones Dictionary (2000)
- CP3015 – Ethiopians – Meets Sir JJ & Friends (2000)
- CP3016 – Lee Perry – Meets Mad Professor
- CP3017 – Various – Creation Rebel + Dub (2000)
- CP3016 – Lee Perry – Meets The Mad Professor
- CP4002 – King Tubby – Fatman Tapes
- CP4003 – Don Carlos – Lazer Beal (1982–1983)
- CP4004 – Prince Lincoln – Unite The World (1983)
- CP4006 – King Tubby – Fatman Tapes Part 2 1978–1982
- CP4009 – Alton Ellis – Many Moods of Alton Ellis 1978–1980
- CP4010 – Barry Brown – BarryBrown Meets Cornell Campbell 1977–1982
- CP4011 – Johnny Clarke – King in the Arena (1978)
- CP4012 – Heptones – King of the Town (2001)
- CP4013 – Horace Andy – Zion Gate 1973–1978
- CP4015 – Zap Pow – Now
- CP6003 – Bob Marley – Soul Captives 1969–1970
- CP6010 – Bob Marley – Jamaican Singles Volume 1969–1972
- CP6012 – King Tubby – Roots & Society (with Lee Perry)
- CP6013 – Toots & the Maytals – Don't Trouble (2000)
- CP6017 – Sly & Robbie – Meet King Tubby 1974–1977
- CP6020 – Lee Perry – Glory Dub (2000)
- CP6021 – Various – Reggae Collection Vol 03 (2000)
- CP6022 – Various – Reggae Collection Vol 04 (2000)
- CP6023 – Various – Reggae Collection Vol 05 (2000)
- CP6024 – Ras Michael – New Name
- CP6027 – I Roy – Meet at King Tubby's Studio (2000) (with Dillinger)
- CP6028 – Various – Leroy Smart & Friends 1976–1978
- CP6030 – King Tubby – Bionic Dub 1975–1977
- CP8001 – Ras Michael – Trilogy 1975–1979
- CP8002 – Jacob Miller – Trilogy (2000)
- CP8003 – Skatalites – Trilogy (2000)
- CP8004 – Lee Perry – Trilogy 1975–1977
- CP8006 – I-Roy – DJ Trilogy 1975-1979 (with Clint Eastwood & Jah Stitch)
- CP8010 – Various – – Ska To Rock Steady Trilogy (2000)
- CP9001 – Dennis Brown – Reggae Best (2001)
- CP9002 – Cimarons – Reggae Best (2001)
- CP9003 – Jimmy Cliff – Reggae Best (2001)
- CP9004 – Dillinger – Reggae Best (2001)
- CP9005 – King Tubby – Fatman Meet Tubby – Reggae Best (2001)
- CP9006 – Heptones – Reggae Best (2001)
- CP9007 – Gregory Isaacs – Reggae Best (2001)
- CP9008 – Israel Vibration – Reggae Best (2001)
- CP9009 – Bob Marley – Reggae Best (2001)
- CP9010 – Ras Michael – Reggae Best (2001)
- CP9011 – Augustus Pablo – Reggae Best (2001)
- CP9012 – Lee Perry – Reggae Best (2001)
- CP9013 – I Roy – Reggae Best (2001)
- CP9014 – U Roy – Reggae Best (2001)
- CP9015 – Toots & the Maytals – Reggae Best (2001)
- CP9016 – King Tubby – Reggae Best (2001)
- CP9017 – Yellowman – Reggae Best (2001)
- CP9018 – Various – Reggae Best – The DJ's (2001)
- CP9019 – Various – Reggae Best – Rub A Dub Style (2001)
- CP9020 – Various – Reggae Best – The Singers (2001)
- CPBX804 – Lee Perry – Trilogy 1975–1977
- CPBX8005 – King Tubby – Trilogy 1974–1979
- CPBX8007 – Toyan – Midnight Rock Trilogy 1981-1983 (with Jah Thomas & Early B)
- CPBX8011 – Various – Reggae From Jamaica (2001)
- CPBX8012 – Bob Marley – First Tracks (2001)
- BBCP2001 – Bob Marley – War Album (With Haile Selassie-Wailers-Etc.)
- Bob Marley – Complete Soul Rebels & Upsetter Record Shop
- Dillinger – Cornbread (1981)
- Leroy Smart – Superstar
- Lee Perry – In Dub Confrontation Vol 01 & 02 (with King Tubby)
- Lee Perry – Heart of the Dragon (1975)
- Jah Stitch – The Killer (1975–1977)
- Keith Tippett, Hugh Hopper, Elton Dean, Joe Gallivan – Mercy Dash (1996 CD / 1985 LP)

== See also ==
- List of record labels
