= Fun in the Son =

Gospel music festival held in Jamaica

Fun in the Son, also known as Best Dressed Fun in the Son, is an annual gospel music festival held in Jamaica.

== History ==
First held in March 2002 as a free event, it was originally staged at King's House and Heroes Circle in Kingston. It became a three-week festival and moved to Kingston in 2005. It is organised by Tommy Cowan and Carlene Davis's Glory Music organisation. Cowan described the aim of the festival as to "win this generation for Christ".

The event attracted sponsorship from the Jamaican Broilers Group and was renamed "Best Dressed Fun in the Son", a reference to the group's Best Dressed Chicken brand. In 2012, Fun in the Son was staged at National Heroes Park in Kingston, one of the official events held as part of the celebrations of Jamaica's 50 years of independence. An event was also held in Haiti in 2013, and an autumn tour of schools in Jamaica took place that year.

As well as musical performances, the event includes religious ministry and expanded to include fairground rides and other attractions. The 2014 event featured extreme sports, football, marching bands, and a Gospel jazz concert.

In 2014, the event was staged in July at the Jamworld Entertainment Complex in Portmore, St. Catherine.

Headline artists over the years have included Papa San, Carlene Davis, Kirk Franklin, and Goddy Goddy. Other artists to perform include Lieutenant Stitchie, Prodigal Son, The Grace Thrillers, Hezekiah Walker, and Ron Kenoly.
