= Clint Eastwood & General Saint =

Reggae deejay duo

Clint Eastwood & General Saint were a reggae deejay duo of the early 1980s, consisting of Clint Eastwood (born Robert Anthony Brammer) and General Saint (born Winston Hislop).

Eastwood was already an established solo deejay who had recorded several albums when he teamed up with British deejay Saint. Their first release was "Tribute to General Echo", about the recently killed slack deejay. They hit the UK Singles Chart with their version of "Last Plane (One Way Ticket)" in 1984. Both of the duo's studio albums made the Top 5 of the UK Independent Chart. Saint went on to have a solo career, releasing singles such as "Save the Last Dance for Me" and "Oh Carol" (both featuring Don Campbell). One of the duo's live performances was recorded by the BBC for their In Concert programme, and this was later released as an album.

The duo reunited to perform at the Luton Love Music Hate Racism festival. They made a video for Love Music Hate Racism featuring Luton band Shabby Tinkerz, and performed live on Mark Lamarr's BBC Radio 2 show. They undertook a UK tour in 2011.

== Discography ==
=== Albums ===
- Two Bad D.J. (1981) Greensleeves (UK No. 99)
- Stop That Train (1983) Greensleeves (UK No. 98)
- BBC Radio 1 in Concert (1993) Windsong

=== Singles ===
- "Tribute to General Echo" (1981), Greensleeves
- "Another One Bites the Dust" (1981), Greensleeves
- "Talk About Run" (1981), Greensleeves
- "Shame & Scandal in the Family" (1982), Greensleeves
- "Matty Gunga Walk" (1982), Greensleeves
- "Stop That Train" (1983), Greensleeves (UK No. 81)
- "Rock with Me" (1983), Greensleeves
- "Shame & Scandal!" (1984), Greensleeves
- "Last Plane (One Way Ticket)" (1984), MCA (UK No. 51)
- "Kool & Deadly" (1986), Rhino/Creole - as "Eastwood & Saint"
- "Super-Cale-Frajie-Listic-Expie-Ali-Doshus" (198?), Legal Light
