= Tenor Saw =

Jamaican singer (1966–1988)

- Born: Clive Bright; 2 December 1966; Kingston, Jamaica
- Died: 13 August 1988 (aged 21) Houston, Texas, United States
- Genres: Reggae, dancehall
- Occupations: Singer-songwriter, singjay
- Years active: 1984-1988

Clive Bright (2 December 1966 – 13 August 1988), better known as Tenor Saw, was a Jamaican dancehall singjay in the 1980s, considered one of the most influential singers of the early digital reggae era. His best-known song was the 1985 hit "Ring the Alarm" on the "Stalag" riddim.

== Biography ==
Born in Victoria Jubilee Hospital, Kingston, Jamaica, Bright was raised as the fourth of six children in the Payne Land, Maverley and Olympic Gardens areas of West Kingston before the family settled in Duhaney Park. Bright had a religious upbringing and sang in the Seventh-day Adventist Church of God choir in Olympic Gardens. Seeking to make it as a recording artist, Bright approached several of Kingston's producers. After being rejected by several others, George Phang gave the youngster a chance; His first single, "Roll Call" was recorded in 1984 for Phang's Powerhouse label, on the "Queen Majesty" riddim. He moved on, with his friend Nitty Gritty, to work with Sugar Minott's Youth Promotion sound system and Black Roots Records label, having hits in Jamaica with the prophetic, symbolic, visionary "Lots of Sign" social awareness discomix, the Jamaican proverb-based "Pumpkin Belly", built on the Sleng Teng rhythm, "Run Come Call Me", and "Fever". His most successful single, however, was "Ring the Alarm", voiced over the "Stalag" riddim for Winston Riley's Techniques label. The singles' success saw Tenor Saw work with King Jammy, recording "Pumpkin Belly" on Jammy's (then) new "Sleng Teng" rhythm. Further hits followed in 1986 with "Golden Hen" (on the Uptempo label), and Minott issued Tenor Saw's debut album, Fever, that year. In common with most dancehall albums of the period, most of the rhythms were digital adaptions of older tunes from the 1960s and 1970s, usually produced originally by Coxsone Dodd or Duke Reid. Thus, "Shirley Jones" is based on the "Rougher Yet" riddim (named after Keith "Slim" Smith's "Rougher Yet"), and "Eeni Meeni Mini Mo" uses the "Real Rock" riddim from Studio One, while "Roll Call" versions The Techniques' "Queen Majesty" from Duke Reid, and "Lots of Sign" uses the bassline of "Tonight" by Keith & Tex, produced by Derrick Harriott.

By the time the album was released, Tenor Saw had relocated to Miami, joining the Skengdon crew, where he recorded "Dancehall Feeling" and "Bad Boys". He recorded "No Work On a Sunday" for Donovan Germain, before moving to New York, where he recorded with Freddie McGregor ("Victory Train"). His last recording, "Chill Out Chill Out", was a duet with General Doggie.

On 31 July 1988, Tenor Saw was seriously injured in a hit and run accident in Houston, Texas. He received treatment at the Ben Taub General Hospital, but succumbed to his injuries two weeks later, on 13 August 1988. He died at 21 years of age. Although other sources insist that he was murdered, his official cause of death was a closed head injury and bumper injuries complicated by a lung infection. Strangely on 26 October 1988, the newspaper Jamaica Gleaner reported that Tenor Saw was shot and killed in New York City (Tenor Saw had been dead for around two months by this point).

Tenor Saw is regarded as one of the most influential singers of the early digital reggae era of the mid-1980s.

== Influence ==
Tenor Saw's friends and colleagues Nitty Gritty ("Who Killed Tenor Saw?") and King Kong ("He was a Friend") both recorded tributes the year after his death.

Super Cat's song "Nuff man a Dead" is about the death of Tenor Saw and other superstars of the time.

Big Audio Dynamite sampled "Ring the Alarm" in their song "Rewind" on their 1989 album Megatop Phoenix.

English Hip Hop duo The Nextmen also references Tenor Saw, as well as the song "Ring the Alarm" on their 2000 composition Amongst the Madness.

A short excerpt from "Ring the Alarm" ("Watch the soundman a-tremble, watch the soundman afraid...") is used in the opening credits of Mark Ronson's 2021 six-episode docuseries Watch the Sound with Mark Ronson, about the use of various types of technology in modern pop music.

Sublime's cover of the Bob Marley and Wailers song "Jailhouse", is essentially a medley, heavily borrowing from the song "Roll Call".

Sublime's song "Caress Me Down" uses the Sleng Teng riddim – which Tenor Saw helped to popularize with his song "Pumpkin Belly".

== Albums ==
- Clash (1985) Witty (with Don Angelo)
- Fever (1986) Blue Mountain/RAS
- Wake the Town: Tribute to Tenor Saw (1992)
- Strictly Livestock (1986) Greensleeves (with Various Artists)
- Clash (1987) Witty (with Cocoa Tea)
- Tenor Saw Lives On (1992) Sky High
- With Lots Signs (2003) Jet Star (Tenor Saw meets Nitty Gritty)
- Tenor Saw Meets Nitty Gritty (2008) VP
