= Carlene Davis =

Jamaican singer

- Born: 23 February 1953 (age 73); Colonels Ridge, Clarendon Parish, Jamaica
- Genres: Reggae, gospel
- Occupation: Singer-songwriter
- Instrument: Vocals
- Years active: Late 1970s–present
- Labels: VP, Gee Street, Glory Music
- Website: www.carlenedavis.net

Carlene Davis (born c. 1953) is a Jamaican gospel and reggae singer active since the 1970s. Successful since the early 1980s as a reggae artist, she survived cancer in the mid-1990s, after which she dedicated her career to gospel music. She has released over ten albums.

== Biography ==
Davis was born in Colonels Ridge, Clarendon Parish and moved to England with her parents at the age of fourteen, where she began to perform professionally a year later, playing guitar in an all-female band before joining the pop trio Toreadores. She then moved to Toronto, Ontario, Canada, where she lived for eight years. Davis initially found fame as a reggae singer. She recorded her debut single in Toronto, a version of "Leaving on a Jet Plane", and had a local hit with a version of Jimmy Cliff's "The Harder They Come".

In 1980, she returned to Jamaica to advance her career, and performed at the Reggae Sunsplash festival in 1981. Also in 1981, she finished runner-up in the Festival Song Contest with "Peace and Love". She had hits in Jamaica with "Like Old Friends Do", "It Must Be Love", "Winnie Mandela", "Stealing Love on the Side", "Dial My Number" and "Going Down to Paradise", and released a string of albums in the 1980s and first half of the 1990s, becoming one of Jamaica's more established female reggae artists. In 1985, she recorded a duet with Gregory Isaacs titled "Feeling Irie" on his Private Beach Party album. In 1990, she was named Best Female Vocalist at the Caribbean Music Awards. She toured as part of the Reggae Sunsplash World Peace Tour in 1991.

In 1996, she was diagnosed with breast cancer and her Christian faith became a more important part of her life. She returned to recording gospel music, which she had first recorded in the early 1990s. She released the album Vessel in 1998, and in 2000 her single "This Island Needs Jesus" was a major hit in several Caribbean countries. She became involved in cancer charity work, with half of the proceeds from her 2003 album Author and Finisher going to the Jamaica Cancer Society. Davis has continued to perform regularly, including appearances at the Redbones Blues Revue, Fun in the Son, and Live on the Waterfront.

In 2000, Davis was named minister of music for The Family Church on the Rock in Kingston. In 2006, she gained a doctorate in pastoral counselling from the Trinity Theological Seminary in South Florida.

By the mid-2000s, Davis had her own recording studio, Judah Recording, and the Glory Music productions record label, run with her husband Tommy Cowan. Her daughter is Naomi Cowan, a reggae musician who won the Juno Award for Reggae Recording of the Year in 2026.

In 2014, Davis released the album Dripping Blood, and announced that 25% of royalties would go to U.S.-based charity Samaritan's Purse to fund its work fighting Ebola in Liberia. The album reached number 3 on the Billboard Reggae Albums chart.

Her latest album, The Assignment, released in 2018, includes a duet with Marion Hall and features contributions from Tyrone Downie, Steven "Cat" Coore, Dean Fraser, and Lloyd Parks.

== Discography ==
- I Remember (19??), Pioneer International
- Ism Schism (1978), Sonic Sounds
- At the Right Time (1980), Carib Gems
- Paradise (1984), Orange
- Yesterday Today Forever (198?), Nicole Music
- Taking Control (1987), Nicole Music
- Reggae Songbird (1990), Peter Pan
- Gospel Reggae (1991), VP
- No Bias (1991), Sonic Sounds
- Carlene Davis (1992), Gee Street
- Taking Control (1992), VP
- Songs of Bob Marley (1993), Eko/VP
- Christmas Reggae Rock (1992), Orchard
- Jesus Is Only a Prayer Away (1992)
- Songs of Freedom (1993), Lagoon
- Echoes of Love (1995), VP
- Passion & Pain (1995), Avex
- Vessel (1998), Jet Star
- Redeemed (2000), VP
- Alive for Jesus (2002), Gospel Times
- Christmas Everyday (2002)
- Author and Finisher (2003), Glory/VP
- Rock Me Jesus (2005), VP/Universal
- True Worship (2009), VP/Glory
- Dripping Blood (2014), VP/Glory
- The Assignment (2018), VP

Compilations

- The 15 Classics (1991), Sonic Sounds
- Best of Glory (2009), VP

Songs in other projects

- Caribbean Gospel: Book One, "One Day at a Time", "Give All to Jesus" (2001), VP
- Caribbean Gospel: Book Two, "I Saw the Light" (with Junior Tucker), "I Surrender All" (2006), VP
- Caribbean Gospel: Book Three, "Rivers of Babylon/I Shall Not be Moved" (2009), VP

=== Charted singles ===
List of charted singles, showing year released, chart positions and album name
Title	Year	Peak chart position	Album
Title	Year	JAM Air.	Album
"My Forever Friend"	1998	10	Vessel
"My Forever Friend"	1998	10	Alive for Jesus
