= Peppermint Beach Club =

Music venue in Virginia Beach, Virginia, US

Coordinates: 36.8468°N 75.9742°W

The Peppermint Beach Club was a 1,000-capacity music venue located in Virginia Beach, Virginia. The club hosted numerous artists before closing its doors in 1994. A few of the artists that performed at the Peppermint Beach Club include B.B. King, Pantera, Nine Inch Nails, Blue Öyster Cult, Motörhead, Body Count, Dave Matthews Band, Bob Seger, Ziggy Marley, Yellowman, and Ace Frehley. The structure was completed in 1926 and has seen many different uses over the years. It was not until the early-1960s that it received its name.

== See also ==
- List of music venues in the United States
