= Pascalli =

American singer, songwriter, and producer

Pascalli is an American singer, songwriter and producer of the Bahamian and Dominican descent. She got started in music when dancehall musician Red Rat discovered her while working on a movie set in 2010. In 2020, she released her first music production project called the "Kwarantine" riddim featuring artists such as Red Rat, Ding Dong, Bay-C formerly of T.O.K. and many others.

== Early life ==
Pascalli was born in Miami, Florida and moved with her mother and step-father to Switzerland. In 1997, her family moved back to the Bahamas. After graduating high school, Pascalli moved to Miami, Florida to further studies and focus on the arts.

== Entertainment career ==
In December 2018, she reached over 20 million streams and counting on Spotify for a song she co-wrote called "Higher" for Red Rat and was awarded a plaque for her accomplishments.

In 2020, Pascalli released her first project as a producer called the "Kwarantine" riddim featuring Dancehall artists such as Red Rat, Ding Dong, Bay-C formerly of T.O.K. and many others. Pascalli has two songs on the riddim, one featuring Ding Dong called "Mad Head" and her solo song called "Hardcore Love".

== Personal life ==
Pascalli and Red Rat have been dating since 2008.
