= Private Beach Party =

Studio album by Gregory Isaacs
- Released: 1985
- Studio: Dynamic Sound Studios, Kingston; Music Mountain Studios, Stony Hill, Kingston
- Genre: Reggae
- Label: Greensleeves
- Producer: Gussie Clarke

Gregory Isaacs chronology
Easy (1984)	Private Beach Party (1985)	All I Have Is Love Love Love (1986)

Private Beach Party is a 1985 studio album by the Jamaican reggae singer Gregory Isaacs. The album continued Isaacs' working relationship with producer Augustus "Gussie" Clarke, to whom he would return in 1988 for the hugely successful "Rumours" and Red Rose for Gregory. Clarke employed Carlton Hines to write several of the songs on the album, and the musicians featured include Sly Dunbar, Robbie Shakespeare, Lloyd Parks, and Willie Lindo.

The album features duets with Carlene Davis (on "Feeling Irie") and Dennis Brown (on "Let off Supm").

Originally released by Greensleeves Records in 1985, it was released in the US by Ras Records.

== Reception ==
Allmusic's Jo-Ann Greene called the album a "masterpiece", stating "There's not a mis-step within the entire set, and every song is so high-caliber that's it's useless to try to pick favorites". Robert Christgau rated the album B+, commenting "there's a light touch to this music--Isaacs whispering and murmuring around diffident horn-section filigrees--that I'd call sexy". Trouser Press described Private Beach Party as "his best album in years — a fresh, diverse package". Steve Barrow & Peter Dalton selected the album as one of their recommendations in The Rough Guide to Reggae, calling the duet with Davis "outstanding".

== Track listing ==
All tracks composed by Carlton "Tetrack" Hines; except where noted

1. "Private Beach Party" (Hines, Willie Lindo)
2. "Wish You Were Mine" (Gregory Isaacs)
3. "Feeling Irie" - Gregory Isaacs & Carlene Davis
4. "Bits and Pieces"
5. "Let Off Supm" - Gregory Isaacs & Dennis Brown
6. "No Rushings" (Phipps)
7. "Better Plant Some Loving"
8. "Special to Me" (Lloyd Forest, Willie Lindo)
9. "Got to Be in Tune"
10. "Promise Is a Comfort"

== Personnel ==
- Gregory Isaacs - vocals
- Lloyd Parks - bass guitar
- Robbie Shakespeare - bass guitar
- Sly Dunbar - drums
- Willie Stewart - drums
- Willie Lindo - guitar, arrangements
- Robert Lyn - piano, synthesizer
- Franklyn "Bubbler" Waul - piano, synthesizer
- Lloyd Forest - backing vocals
- David Harvey - backing vocals
- Carlton Hines - backing vocals
- Dean Fraser - horns
- David Madden - horns
- Ronald "Nambo" Robinson - horns
- Rass Brass - horns
- Junior "Chico" Chin - horns
- Carlene Davis - vocals
- Dennis Brown - vocals
