= Brigadier Jerry =

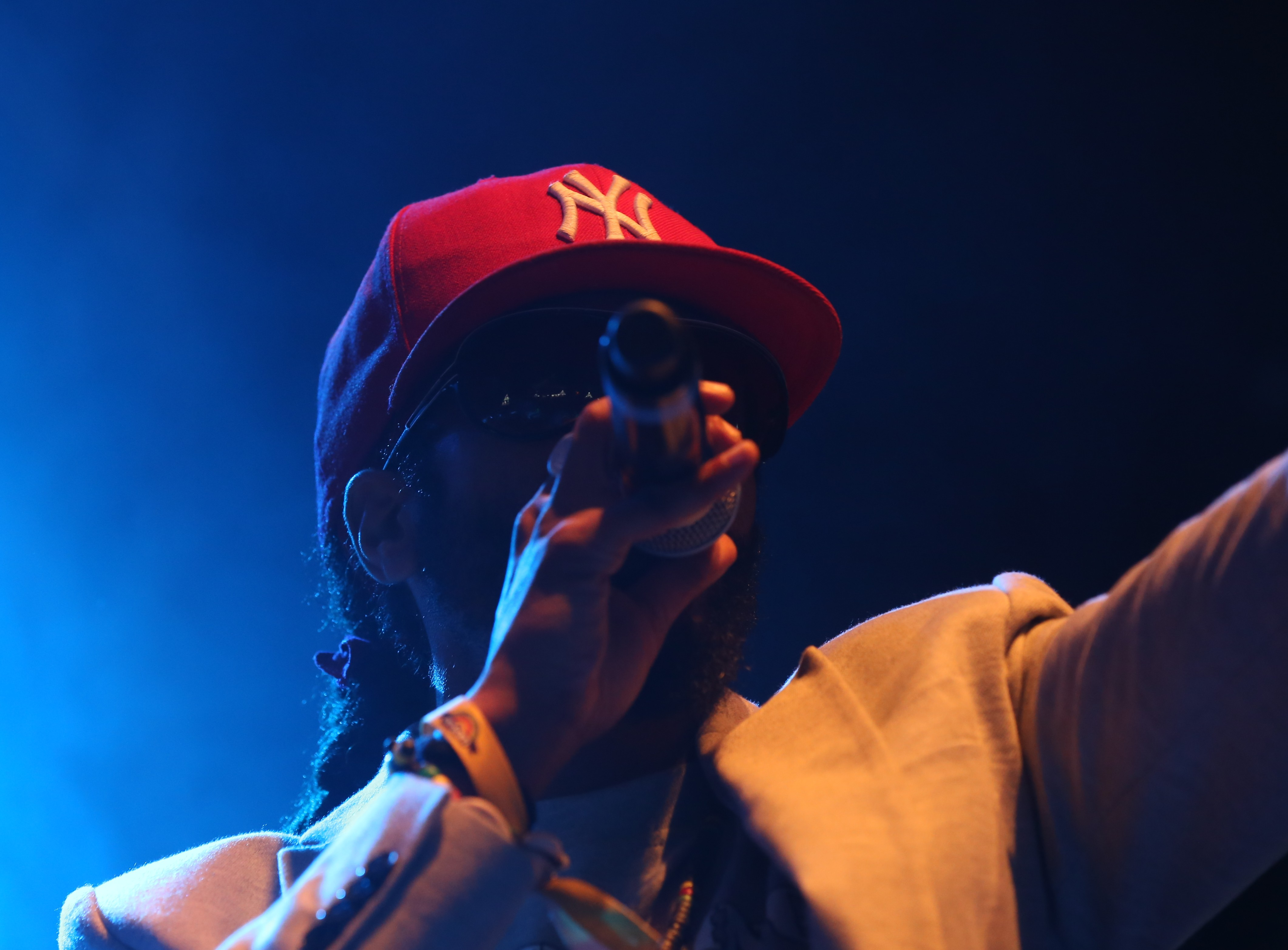
- Brigadier Jerry in 2013

Background information
- Also known as: The General
- Born: Robert Russell; 28 September 1957 (age 68)
- Origin: Kingston, Jamaica
- Genres: Reggae; Dancehall
- Occupation: Deejay
- Years active: 1975 – present
- Labels: Jwyanza, RAS

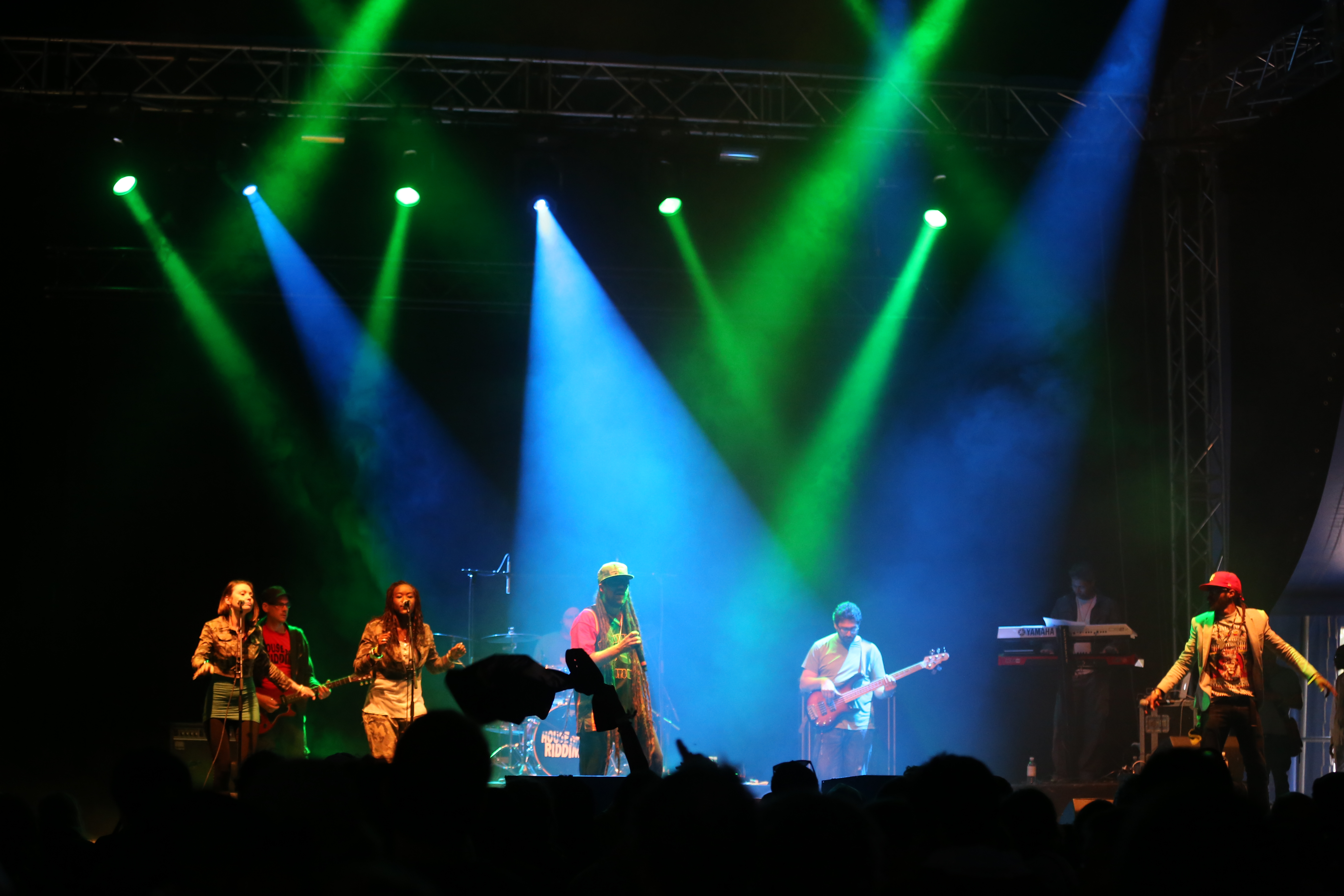
Brigadier Jerry with Jah Sun (2013)

Robert Russell (born 28 September 1957), better known by the stage name Brigadier Jerry, is a Jamaican dancehall reggae deejay known for his "cultural" lyrics.

== Biography ==
Brigadier Jerry, often nicknamed "Briggy" and "The General", was born in the Papine area of eastern Kingston in 1957, and he became interested in music at an early age, initially linking with U Roy's King Stur-Gav Hi-Fi sound system. Jerry's earliest stage appearances were as a young man performing stand-up comedy, but he soon switched to deejaying for local sound systems. He became a member of the Rastafarian organisation Twelve Tribes of Israel by 1978 and spread their message on the Jah Love Muzik sound system. By 1980, Brigadier Jerry was one of Jamaica's most sought-after performers by sound systems across the island, and a well-respected deejay among his peers. He recorded for Studio One in the early 1980s before having his first hits with "Pain" (on the Answer/Never Let Go riddim) and "Gwan a School" for producer Delroy Stansbury on the Jwyanza label in 1982. His first album was the live recording Live at the Controls in 1983, and his debut studio album, Jamaica Jamaica, was released in 1985. He often chats verses directly from the Bible, and preaches against the evils of slackness in dancehall music when performing. He attributes his unique pattern to melding together the styles of a few artists who came before him, including U-Roy, Prince Jazzbo, Big Youth, and Dennis Alcapone.

Jerry has recorded five albums over the years, but the bulk of his career has been spent touring the world, as well as Jamaica, performing over countless sound systems. He still records the occasional single, most recently for the Ranking Joe label, but remains primarily a live performer (mostly for King Sturgav). He is considered by many to be U-Roy's greatest student; a stable which includes Ranking Joe, Josey Wales, Charlie Chaplin, U Brown on down to modern-day deejays such as Buju Banton.

He lived in New York with his wife and children Jermaine, and many more between 1988 and 1991 before returning to Jamaica and performing again on the Jah Love Muzik sound system. In the late 1990s, U-Roy revived his Stur-Gav sound and Jerry returned as a touring deejay. He is now based in the United States.

Jerry also nurtured the career of his sister Ophlin Russell, who performs and records as Sister Nancy.

In November 2019 he was arrested in Connecticut on charges of first-degree robbery, first-degree reckless endangerment, illegal discharge of a firearm, carrying a pistol without a permit, illegal transfer of a pistol and altering a serial number on a firearm, after a shooting incident at a restaurant.

== Discography ==
- Live at the Controls (1983), Dance Hall
- Jamaica Jamaica (1985), RAS
- On the Road (1986), RAS
- Hail Him (1992), Tappa
- Freedom Street (1995), VP
