= General Echo =

- Born: Earl Anthony Robinson; 8 December 1955
- Origin: Kingston, Jamaica
- Died: 22 November 1980 (aged 24)
- Genres: Reggae
- Instrument: Vocals

Earl Anthony Robinson (8 December 1955 – 22 November 1980), better known as General Echo, a.k.a. Ranking Slackness, was one of the first reggae deejays to move away from 'cultural' lyrics towards 'slackness' (risqué or sexually explicit lyrics).

== Biography ==
Born in the Fletcher's Land area of Kingston, Jamaica, General Echo was regarded by some as the most original deejay since Big Youth. He had a profound influence on many of the deejays that followed, particularly in the United Kingdom.

After coming to prominence on sound systems such as Gemini, Stereo Phonic, and Ray Symbolic, he operated his own Echo Tone Hi Fi sound system, and was one of the first major artists to achieve popularity on 'yard tapes'. Echo had achieved success with "Drunken Master" for George Phang, and had a number one hit in Jamaica with "Arleen", on Winston Riley's "Stalag" rhythm, which was followed by the album The Slackest. This was followed by 12 Inches of Pleasure for producer Henry "Junjo" Lawes.

Echo was shot dead by police in Kingston, Jamaica, in 1980, along with selector Flux (who also worked on his Echo Tone sound system), and Stereo Phonic owner Leon 'Big John' Johns, after they had stopped the car they were travelling in. The whole incident was never satisfactorily explained. Echo's death inspired Clint Eastwood & General Saint to team up and release the "Tribute to General Echo" single.

== Discography ==
=== Albums ===
- People Are You Ready (1978) Ballistic (Prince Mohammed & General Echo)
- Rocking & Swing (1979) Manzie
- Slackest LP (1979) Techniques (as Ranking Slackness)
- 12 Inches of Pleasure (1980) Greensleeves
- Tribute To General Echo (1983) Mandingo
- Teacher Fe Di Class (2007) Equalizer (expanded edition of Rocking & Swing)
- Stereo Phonic Live Session (with Madoo)

=== Contributing artist ===
- The Rough Guide to Reggae (1997) World Music Network
