= Young, Gifted and Yellow =

Compilation album by Yellowman
- Released: 22 April 2013
- Recorded: c. 1970 – c. 1984
- Genre: Dancehall reggae
- Length: 145:58
- Label: 17 North Parade; Greensleeves Records; VP Records
- Producer: Lloyd Campbell; Christopher Chin; Augustus "Gussie" Clarke; Burtland Dixon; Henry 'Junjo' Lawes

Young, Gifted and Yellow is a compilation album by Yellowman, released originally in the United Kingdom on 22 April 2013, and subsequently in other European countries in the following days by VP Records. It features rarities, outtakes and live performances from the period 1970–84, including songs with Fathead and Sister Nancy. It contains "Zunga Zeng", which is commonly known as the most popular song by Yellowman.

The album was released individually in numerous European countries, including a bonus DVD of a live-performance of Yellowman at the Reggae Sunsplash in 1988.

== Content ==
The album includes material from Yellowman from his albums Mister Yellowman, Nobody Move, and more. Spanning two discs, 40 songs all-together from his prime years, the production company remastered the tracks before release.

== Track listing ==
=== CD 1 ===
All lyrics are written by Winston Foster.

No.	Title	Length
1.	"Mad over Me"	3:25
2.	"Shorties"	4:36
3.	"Soldier Take Over"	4:01
4.	"Lost Me Love"	5:11
5.	"Mister Chin"	3:07
6.	"Mr. Wong"	3:11
7.	"Herbsman Smuggling"	2:56
8.	"Eventide Fire"	2:55
9.	"Operation Eradication"	3:37
10.	"Out of Hand"	3:33
11.	"Them a Fight I"	3:02
12.	"Death of Barnabas"	3:08
13.	"King and Queen" (featuring Sister Nancy)	3:20
14.	"I'm Getting Married"	3:36
15.	"I'm Getting Divorced"	3:32
16.	"Morning Ride"	3:54
17.	"Night Flight"	3:45
18.	"Top Form"	3:19
19.	"Water Rock" (featuring Fathead)	3:36
20.	"Duppy or Gunman"	4:00

=== CD 2 ===
All lyrics are written by Winston Foster.

No.	Title	Length
1.	"Zunga Zeng"	1:22
2.	"Who Can Make the Dance Ram"	4:28
3.	"Quiet"	3:36
4.	"Bunn the Kootchie"	7:21
5.	"The Girl Is Mine" (featuring Peter Metro)	3:33
6.	"Ram Jam Master"	3:10
7.	"Body Moves"	3:37
8.	"Nobody Move Nobody Get Hurt"	3:41
9.	"Galong Galong Galong"	3:18
10.	"Walking Jewelry Store"	3:23
11.	"Gregory Free"	3:55
12.	"Jah Make Us Fi a Purpose" (featuring Sister Nancy)	4:10
13.	"Love Struck"	2:48
14.	"Rub a Dub a Play"	3:28
15.	"Rub and Go Down" (featuring Fathead)	3:51
16.	"Bim and Bam"	3:16
17.	"One Yellowman Ina the Yard" (featuring Fathead)	3:35
18.	"Strong Mi Strong"	3:50
19.	"Blueberry Hill"	3:46
20.	"Where Is Santa Claus"	4:06
