= Nobody Move, Nobody Get Hurt =

Nobody Move, Nobody Get Hurt may refer to:

- Nobody Move (album), a 1983 album by Yellowman, released in a slightly altered form outside Jamaica in 1984 as Nobody Move Nobody Get Hurt and its corresponding title track
- "Nobody Move", a song by Eazy-E from 1988's Eazy-Duz-It which samples the Yellowman track
- "Nobody Move, Nobody Get Hurt", a song by We Are Scientists from their 2005 album With Love and Squalor
