= The Bush Chemists =

British reggae group

- Origin: London, England
- Genres: Reggae, Dub
- Years active: 1993–present
- Labels: Conscious Sounds, ROIR, Fashion, Universal Egg
- Members: Dougie Wardrop; Paul Davey; Kevin Roberts; Colture Freeman

The Bush Chemists are a British dub reggae group.

== History ==
Wardrop formed The Bush Chemists in 1993 as a side-project to his other band Centry. He had run a record stall in Camden Market since 1988, . He began creating his own dub tracks using a 4-track recorder in 1989, setting up his own Conscious Sounds label shortly afterwards. His main collaborator is Paul Davey, and they have worked regularly with singers including Kenny Knots and Culture Freeman. The debut album Dubs from Zion Valley was a collaboration with Jonah Dan, released in 1994, and their first US release was Dub Outernational, recorded in Wardrop's attic studio, and released in 1996 on ROIR. The band mix traditional reggae with digital dub. Albums followed regularly through the late 1990s and early 2000s, including 2005's Raw Raw Dub, also released on ROIR. Wardrop also engineers the Jah Warrior releases.

== Discography ==
=== Albums ===
- Strictly Dubwise (1994), Conscious Sounds/Universal Egg
- Dub Outernational (1996), ROIR
- Light Up Your Spliff (1996), Conscious Sounds
- In Dub: Light Up Your Chalice (1999), Dubhead
- Dub Fire Blazing (2001), Dubhead
- Raw Raw Dub (2005), ROIR
- Bush Chemists Singles (2010), Conscious Sounds

Collaborations

- Dubs From Zion Valley (1994), JKPD – Jonah Dan meets The Bush Chemists
- Fashion Records & Conscious Sound Present a Dub Convention: The Bush Chemists Meet The Dub Organiser (1996), Fashion/Conscious Sounds
- Money Run Things (1996), Conscious Sounds – credited to 'King General Bucks Up Pon De Bush Chemists'
- The Conqueror (1998), Dubhead – Culture Freeman Meets The Bush Chemists
- Gime De Music (2003), Conscious Sounds – Kenny Knots meets De Bush Chemists
- King General Re Encounters The Bush Chemists – Broke Again (2009), Conscious Sounds – with King General

=== Singles ===
- "Dread Inna Babylon" (1996), Conscious Sounds – Culture Freeman & The Bush Chemists
- Dub Clash '96 EP (1996), Universal Egg – Jah Free & The Bush Chemists
- "Joker Smokin'" (1996), Conscious Sounds – King General & The Bush Chemists
- "Dub Fire Blazing" (2001), Dubhead – split with Mungo's Hifi
- "16 Years"/"King Davids House" (2003), Conscious Sounds – feat. Lutan Fyah and Culture Freeman
- "Technology" (2003), Conscious Sounds – Pablo Gad & The Bush Chemists
- "Tribal Warriors" (2003), Conscious Sounds – Bobby Blue & The Bush Chemists
- "Beat Around The Bush" (2004), Conscious Sounds – Lutan Fyah & The Bush Chemists
- "East of Jaro" (2004), Conscious Sounds – The Love Grocer meets The Bush Chemists
- "Original Spread Out" (2005), Conscious Sounds – Kenny Knots/The Bush Chemists
- "The Middle Way" (2005), Conscious Sounds – Chazbo/The Bush Chemists
- "Up There" (2005), Lush – Kenny Knots Meets The Bush Chemist
- "Babylon Fall Down" (2006), Jah Tubbys – Kenny Knots & The Bush Chemists
- "Meditation Master" (2006), Roots Temple – Ital Horns meets The Bush Chemists
- "Roots Temple" (2006), Roots Temple – Ital Horns meets The Bush Chemists
- "Star Dub" (2006), Jah Tubbys
- "This Train" (2006), Diop Side – King Kong/The Bush Chemists
- "Victory" (2006), Conscious Sounds – Singer Blue/The Bush Chemists
- "Gold Chain" (2007), Conscious Sounds – Dandelion/The Bush Chemists
- Rewind & Remix Vol.2 EP (2007), Scoops – Vibronics meets The Bush Chemists
- "Seven Winds From The East" (2008), Roots Temple – Makiko & The Bush Chemists
- "Wicked Men" (2009), Vibescreator – Fu-steps/The Bush Chemists
- "Collie Weed" (????), Conscious Sounds – The Bush Chemists & Disco Dread
- "Going Home" (????), Conscious Sounds – Kenny Knots & The Bush Chemists
- Gunman/The Fittest EP (????), Conscious Sounds – feat. King General & Culture Freeman
- "Some People" (????), Dubology – King General & the Bush Chemists
