= Pablo Gad =

- Genres: Reggae, roots reggae, dub
- Years active: 1977–present
- Labels: Caribbean, Klik Records, Burning Sounds, Celluloid, FORM, Greensleeves, Reggae On Top, Twinkle Music

Pablo Gad is a British Jamaican Conscious Roots reggae singer and songwriter. He is considered one of the UK's most militant and outspoken vocalists in roots reggae music.

== Biography ==
Pablo Gad was born in Jamaica and came to live in the United Kingdom in 1974. With a voice reminiscent of singer Fred Locks, Gad began recording in the late 1970s. His first singles were "International Dread" and "Kunta Kinte" on the Caribbean label in 1977. In 1978 Gad emerged with "Bloodsuckers" on the Burning Sounds label.

Further singles included "Natty Loving", "Trafalgar Square", "Throw Your Dreams" and "Riddle I Dis". His first album Trafalgar Square was released in 1979 riding on the "Bloodsuckers" hit. The album was composed, produced and arranged by Pablo himself.

1980 was a prolific year for Pablo, releasing a string of hits such as the discomix "Gun Fever", "Nursery Rhyme", "Oh Jah", "Fly Away Home" and "Hard Time", all of which were enthusiastically received by the devoted followers of Lloyd Coxsone and Jah Shaka sounds. The Hard Times album that featured some of these hits was released in 1980 on the FORM label. The single "Hard Time" was inspired by a visit back "home" to Jamaica where Gad noticed that there was a different type of suffering experienced. He had noticed that life in the UK was not as bad as it seemed as people "got their Giro every week". Gad toured regularly with Black Slate as the main backing band. The band's Ras Elroy played bass on "Hard Time" with Keith and Tony Douglas on harmonies and Gooseberry Sound Studios' Mark Lusardi, renowned for his groundbreaking work with Creation Rebel and Prince Far I, as sound engineer.

The records helped him win two gold discs for best album and best male vocalist in the Black Echoes magazine readers poll in 1980.

Gad continued to record songs through the 1980s, 1990s and 2000s and he is still recording currently. The Best of Pablo Gad compilation album on the Reggae On Top label in 1993 featured his early singles. He recorded with Conscious Sounds label with The Bush Chemists.

== Sampled ==
In 1990s some of Pablo Gad's tunes were sampled by Breakbeat hardcore artists. "Hard Time" has been sampled by The Prodigy, on their "Fire" single and also Nu Matic on their "Hard Times" single.

== Discography ==
=== Albums ===
- 1979: Trafalgar Square aka Blood Suckers (Burning Sounds/Celluloid)
- 1980: Hard Times (FORM)
- 1983: Bloodsuckers (Sound Products Holland)
- 1993: Epistles of Dub - Chapter One (Reggae On Top)
- 1993: Life Without Death (Reggae On Top)
- 2003: Don't Push Jah (Reggae On Top)
- 2012: Armageddon Dawn “Raw” At King Earthquake Studio (Reggae On Top)
- 2012: Armageddon Dawn “Refined” At Conscious Sounds Studio (Reggae On Top)
