= Josey Wales (singer) =

Jamaican singer

Josey Wales OD
- Also known as: The Outlaw; The Colonel
- Born: Joseph Winston Sterling; 8 October 1959 (age 67) (Note: Josey has several birth-dates: In some news/social media posts it is 9 October, others 24 June. In the song "Bible Never Fail Me Yet", he claims he was born in June.)
- Origin: St. Mary, Jamaica
- Genres: Dancehall; Toasting; Reggae
- Years active: 1977–present (Note: His first official release was in 1982, but his career dates back to 1977 when he joined the sound-system Roots Unlimited.)

Josey Wales OD (born Joseph Winston Sterling, (Note: In some ASCAP records, he is credited as Joseph Alphonso Sterling.) 8 October 1959) is a Jamaican dancehall singer. He has been called, along with Brigadier Jerry, Yellowman and sound system partner Charlie Chaplin, one of the best Jamaican dancehall deejays of the 1980s. Wales is named after the 1976 Western movie character from The Outlaw Josey Wales, played by Clint Eastwood, and subsequently nicknamed "The Outlaw".

His career began in 1977, first starting as a deejay on the Roots Unlimited sound-system where he often sparred with Burro Banton, and later performing over U-Roy-owned King Sturgav sound system. He gained even more popularity in the early 1980s performing over Henry "Junjo" Lawes's Volcano sound system, and recording singles such as "Bobo Dread" and "Leggo Mi Hand" (which peaked at number four on the Jamaican singles chart) for Lawes' label of the same name, as well as later hits for George Phang's Power House label, most noticeably "Undercover Lover".

He was shot and robbed in a Kingston bar in 1997, an incident that he dealt with in the country and western song "Bushwacked". He survived the robbery, and after his discharge from a hospital, he went to the United States and bought an ambulance to donate for the Kingston Public Hospital.

He appeared in Shaggy's "Bad Man Don't Cry" video, and by 2014 had begun recording new material.

In October 2017, he was awarded the Order of Distinction by the Jamaican government. (Note: His official status has never been disputed since 2017, although: In several live-performances dating back earliest to 1987 at the Bigga Ford Xmas Show, Wales often chatted that he had the Order of Distinction from the Governor-General. (then Florizel Glasspole))

== Personal life ==
Josey is a Rastafarian and has been since 1975 but also retains a major influence of Christianity. He was baptized in May 1959. He currently resides in Kingston.

== Discography ==
This discography is incomplete; you can help by adding missing albums/singles. (Note: Due to many singles and LPs released by different sound-systems/labels and considering the amount of publishing in the 1980s in Jamaica, it is hard to identify the full amount of works Wales has created. His most-complete discography is available on Discogs.)

=== Albums and later single ===
- 1983 – Josie Wales Meets Early-B
- 1983 – Outlaw, also called The Outlaw Josey Wales
- 1983 – King Yellowman Meets The Mighty Josey Wales (Note: Jamaican import version of Two Giants Clash, features majority of the same songs.)
- 1984 – No Way No Better Than Yard
- 1984 – Two Giants Clash (split with Yellowman)
- 1985 – Undercover Lover
- 1986 – Rules, also called Ruling
- 1986 – Ha Fi Say So
- 1988 – Special Prayer
- 1988 – Na Lef Jamaica
- 1989 – How Yu Mouth Tan So
- 1991 – Code of Conduct
- 1994 – Outlaw (reissue)
- 1994 – Charlie Chaplin and Josey Wales – Kings of the Dancehall
- 1994 – Cowboy Style
- 2001 – Rulin (reissue)
- 2015 – "Loving Pauper" b/w "Sista Sensi"
