= Charlie Chaplin (singer) =

Jamaican musician

Charlie Chaplin OD
- Born: Richard Patrick Bennett
- Origin: Jamaica
- Genres: Dancehall reggae
- Labels: RAS; Tamoki Wambesi; Trojan; Crown Production

Richard Patrick Bennett OD, better known by the stage name Charlie Chaplin, is a Jamaican dancehall and ragga singer and deejay. It was common for Jamaican deejays of the era to name themselves after film stars or characters. Bennett, however, had been nicknamed after the comedian since his youth. His career began in 1980 when he began working with U-Roy's Stur-Gav Hi-Fi collective. He became extremely popular throughout Jamaica, memorable for his focus on cultural and social themes instead of the "slack" (rough, violent) lyrics that were popular at the time. His popularity as a live performer prompted Roy Cousins to produce some recording sessions with the young DJ. Chaplin's debut album was the Cousins-produced Presenting Charlie Chaplin in 1982, with several albums following for the producer over the next three years.

The contrast between Chaplin's "culture" lyrics and the other major deejays of the day led to the 1984 "clash" album with Yellowman Slackness Vs Pure Culture.

Que Dem (1985), was produced by George Phang and he continued recording, working with Bunny Roots, Josey Wales, Sly & Robbie, Henry "Junjo" Lawes, Roots Radics and Doctor Dread.

In 2013, Bennett was awarded the Order of Distinction by the Jamaican government.

Bennett started his own Crown Production label, on which he released his own music. An album, Armageddon, was set for release in Summer 2016.

== Discography ==
- Presenting Charlie Chaplin (1982), Kingdom
- Red Pond (1982), Tamoki Wambesi
- Chaplin Chant, Tamoki Wambesi
- One of a Kind (1983), Trojan
- Fire Burn Them Below (1984), Power House
- Roots & Culture (1984), Vista Sounds
- Sound System (1984), Arrival
- Que Dem (1985), Sonic Sounds
- Quenchie, Tamoki Wambesi
- Yellowman Meets Charlie Chaplin, Power House – with Yellowman
- Live at Maypen Clarendon (1988), Tamoki Wambesi
- Two Sides of Charlie Chaplin (1989), RAS
- Take 2 (1990), RAS
- Cry Blood (1991), RAS
- Old and New Testament (1992), RAS
- Kings of the Dancehall (1994), VP – with Josey Wales
- Too Hot to Handle (1994), RAS
- The Negril Chill (1997), Shellshock – with Yellowman
- Gwaan U Ways (2001), P.O.T.
- Free Africa, Sonic Sounds

Compilations

- 20 Super Hits (1991), Sonic Sounds
- Dance Hall Rockers, Sunset
- Dance Hall Rockers vol. 2, Harry J
- Ras Portraits (1997), RAS
- Face to Face (2000), Cactus
- Respect Due (2000), Creole
- DJ Roll Call (2006), RAS
- Kings of Reggae, Nocturne

== Bibliography ==
- Bradley, Lloyd (2001). This is Reggae. New York: Grove Press.
- Chang, Kevin O'Brien and Wayne Chen (1998). Reggae Routes. Philadelphia: Temple University Press.
- Weber, Tom and Brian Jahn (1998). Reggae Island: Jamaican Music in the Digital Age. New York: Da Capo Press.
