= Out Deh! =

Studio album by Gregory Isaacs
- Released: 1983
- Studio: Tuff Gong
- Genre: Reggae
- Label: Island
- Producer: Gregory Isaacs, Flabba Holt

Gregory Isaacs chronology
Crucial Cuts (1983)	Out Deh! (1983)	Live at Reggae Sunsplash (1983)

Out Deh! is an album by the Jamaican musician Gregory Isaacs, released in 1983. Its title refers to Isaacs's release from prison, where he had served time for various charges. "Love Me with Feeling" was released as a single. Isaacs supported the album with a North American tour.

== Production ==
The album was recorded with the Roots Radics band at Tuff Gong. Synthesizers and overdubs were added later, in London. Isaacs wrote all of the album's songs. "Dieting" was written while Issacs was in prison. "Love Me with Feeling" incorporates elements of disco.

== Critical reception ==
Professional ratings
Review scores
Source	Rating
All Music Guide	3/5 stars
Robert Christgau	B+
The Encyclopedia of Popular Music	4/5 stars
Midweek	3/5 stars
Reggae & Caribbean Music	6/10
Rolling Stone	3/5 stars

The Evening Advertiser said, "The album effectively merges Isaacs's sweet and sensual soul feel with the clash and clatter of metallic synthesizers." The Guardian called "Star" and "Sheila" "cool, elegant love songs". Midweek praised Isaacs's "distinctive, melancholy voice". The North Bay Nugget concluded that Isaacs "remains miles ahead of the competition" but criticized his "insistence of remaining within the cosy confines of soft reggae". The Blade-Tribune called Out Deh! "one of the freshest albums of pure reggae out in a long time."

Rolling Stone opined that "the grooves are all tidily in place and the singing is impeccable." USA Today considered the music to be "smooth, easy-going, confident." The Boston Globe labeled Isaacs "the world's loneliest and sexiest lover doing what he does best." Robert Christgau praised "the Roots Radics' profound angularity and Isaacs's smooth concentration and subtle hooks."

== Track listing ==
No.	Title	Length
1.	"Good Morning"
2.	"Private Secretary"
3.	"Yes I Do"
4.	"Sheila"
5.	"Out Deh"
6.	"Star"
7.	"Dieting"
8.	"Love Me with Feeling"
