= Two Giants Clash =

Studio album by Yellowman, Josey Wales
- Released: 1984
- Recorded: c. 1973 – c. 1984
- Genre: Dancehall reggae
- Length: 32:58
- Label: Greensleeves
- Producer: Henry "Junjo" Lawes

Alternative cover
- Jamaican release cover

Professional ratings
Review scores
Source	Rating
AllMusic	4.5/5 stars
The Encyclopedia of Popular Music	4/5 stars

Yellowman Versus Josey Wales – Two Giants Clash, colloquially known as Two Giants Clash, is a single split album by the Jamaican reggae and dancehall deejays Yellowman and Josey Wales. In 1984, it was released as Two Giants Clash in the United States by Greensleeves Records.

== Content ==
The album includes five songs from both Yellowman and Josey Wales, pitting them in a "rap battle" against each other. Stephen Cook of AllMusic called the album a highlight of the dancehall era of the late 1970s and early 1980s, and said that "besides some top toasting, the album also features superb backdrops from Lawes and the Roots Radics."

== Track listing ==
=== Yellowman side A ===
All lyrics are written by Winston Foster.

No.	Title	Length
1.	"Society Party"	3:20
2.	"Strictly Bubbling"	4:03
3.	"Mr. Big Shot"	3:53
4.	"King Of The Crop"	3:49
5.	"Wrong Girl to Play With"	5:11

=== Josey Wales side B ===
All lyrics are written by Josey Wales.

No.	Title	Length
1.	"Bobo Dread"	3:07
2.	"Mi Have Fi Get You"	4:01
3.	"Cure For The Fever"	3:24
4.	"Jah A Mi Guiding Star"	2:16
5.	"Sorry To Say"	2:50
