= King Kong (musician) =

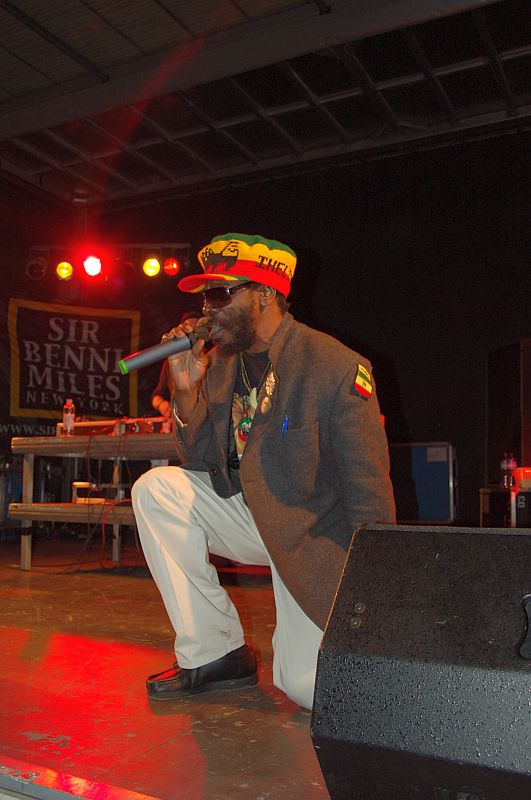

Background information
- Born: Dennis Anthony Thomas; 26 March 1962 (age 64); Kingston, Jamaica
- Genres: Reggae, dancehall
- Years active: 1982–present
- Labels: Greensleeves, Jammy's, Firehouse

Dennis Anthony Thomas (born 26 March 1962), better known as King Kong, is a Jamaican deejay/singer best known for his work in the 1980s.

== Biography ==
Born in Kingston, Thomas first recorded as a deejay at Tuff Gong studios in 1982, initially working under the name Junior Kong, named after his father. His debut single was "Pink Eye". He worked with GT and then his own Love Bunch sound system and then recorded for King Tubby's Firehouse label, now singing in a similar style to Tenor Saw. The early King Kong recordings for Tubby were over early digital rhythms, and included songs such as "AIDS" and "Babylon", and established him as a popular artist. His first album release was split with another of Tubby's singers, Anthony Red Rose, with Two Big Bull Inna One Pen issued on Firehouse. During 1986 and 1987, Kong recorded for several of Jamaica's top producers, including Prince Jammy, with whom he enjoyed his biggest hits with "Trouble Again" (the title track from his Jammy-produced debut album proper) and "Legal We Legal", Black Scorpio, Harry J, Errol Thompson, Ossie Hibbert, Bunny Lee, and Prince Jazzbo. While many of his songs were typical in content of the era, several of his songs had political and cultural themes. He released several albums during this period before relocating first to New York, and then to Canada in the late 1980s, where he released material occasionally on his Conscious Music label. The death of Tenor Saw in 1988 prompted King Kong to release "He Was a Friend" as a tribute, and in 1989 he relocated to England and recorded with Mafia & Fluxy and Gussie P in the early 1990s. He began recording more regularly again in the 2000s.

== Discography ==
=== Albums ===
Title	Year	Label	Notes
Trouble Again	1986	Greensleeves / Jammy's	Released 10 November 1986; reissued 2008 on Greensleeves with bonus tracks; issued in the UK as Trouble Again
Two Big Bull Inna One Pen	1986	Firehouse	Split release with Anthony Red Rose
Legal We Legal	1986	Jammy's	
Dancehall Session	1986	Striker Lee	
Musical Confrontation	1986	Jammy's	With Nitty Gritty
Big Heavy Load	1987	Striker Lee	
Identify Me	1987	Black Solidarity	
Musical Terrorist	1980s	Our Land Sound Productions	
Rumble Jumble Life	2005	Massive B	
Ethiopian Dream	2012	King Shiloh	

=== Singles ===
Title	Year	Label	Notes
"Pink Eye"	1982	56 Hope Road	
"Sensimania Is Walking"	1985	R:E:M	
"Ninja"	1985	Sunset	
"You Pack Up and Gone"	1986	Jammy's	
"Can't Ride Computer"	1986	Jammy's	Riddim: Tempo
"AIDS"	1986	Firehouse	
"Babylon"	1986	Firehouse	
"Trouble Again"	1986	Greensleeves / Jammy's	
"Mix Up"	1986		
"Legal We Legal"	1986	Greensleeves	
"Paro Them Paro"	1986	Greensleeves	
"Niceness"	1986	Black Scorpio	
"Rich & Switch"	1986	Java	
"Rip and Run Off"	1986	Big M	
"Don't Touch My Boops"	1986	Jammy's	
"Big Boy"	1986	Oneness	
"Rocky Road"	1986	Fresh Roses	
"Raggamuffin A Pass"	1986	Ujama	
"Have Some Approach"	1980s	Black Solidarity	
"Identify Me"	1980s	Black Scorpio	
"Nice Christmas"	1980s	Firehouse	
"Step on My Corn"	1980s	Firehouse	
"No Call Me No Boops"	1980s	Firehouse	
"Good Fi Nuttin"	1980s	Firehouse	
"Girls Dem A Come"	1980s	Ujama	
"Can't Distress Me"	1980s	Parish	
"Toots Boops"	1987		
"Eden a Come"	1987	Black Scorpio	
"Can't Tan It"	1987	Sunset	
"Musical Terrorist"	1987	Sunset	
"Time Is the Master"	1987	Upsetter Music	
"No Touch De Gorilla"	1987		
"Reggae Mylitis"	1980s	Sunset	
"Over Cover Lover"	1980s	Live & Love	
"Dollars Strong"	1980s	MCM	
"Highest Grade"	1980s	Black Scorpio	
"Ragamuffin A Pass"	1980s	Now Generation	
"Predominent"	1980s	Now Generation	
"Du No Get High"	1980s	Ottey's	
"Song of Love"	1980s	Pisces	
"Don't Trouble Trouble"	1980s	Striker Lee	
"Glamour Boy in Mi Life"	1980s	Striker Lee	
"Must Work on Sunday"	1980s	Striker Lee	
"Moving on African Border"	1980s	Striker Lee	
"Four Year Old"	1980s	Apple Tree	
"Job"	1980s	Apple Tree	
"Agony and Pain"	1980s	Jah Life Time	
"Here I Am"	1980s–1990s	Bugu B	
"He Was a Friend"	1988	Conscious Music	
"Magic Moment"	1989	Taurus	
"Identify Me"	date unknown	Digikal	
"Digital We Digital"	date unknown	Digikal	
"Once Upon a Time"	1980s	King Kong	With Leroy Mafia
"Progress"	1980s	Thunderbolt	
"Break Down the Walls"	date unknown	Jammy's	
"Jah Jah Rule"	date unknown	Thompson Sound	
"Who Say"	date unknown	Thompson Sound	
"Dem A Fake"	date unknown	Jammy's	
"Imagine"	date unknown	Jammy's	
"Seize All Guns"	date unknown	Jammy's	
"Try Not I"	date unknown		
"Not a Bwoy Caan Test We"	1991	Gussie P	
"Trouble Again Pt. 2"	1990s	Jammy's	
"Unity Medley"	date unknown	Massive Sounds	With Anthony B and Burro Banton
"Unfortunate Children"	date unknown	Ffrench	
"Have a Little Sound"	date unknown	Sinbad	
"Bag Juice & Cheese Chips"	1990s	Massive B	
"Call Mr. Madden"	1995	Massive B	
"Earth Is the Lord"	date unknown	Massive B	
"Ethiopia"	date unknown	Massive B	
"Free Speech"	date unknown	Massive B	
"Legalize It"	date unknown	Massive B	
"Troubles"	date unknown	Massive B	
"Unity"	date unknown	Massive B	
"Seem Dem There"	date unknown	Reggae Explorer	
"My Darling"	1998	Jammy's	
"Works of Jah"	2001	Roots Foundation	
"Jah Is My Best Friend"	2002	Massive B	
"Big Money Pay"	2000s	Badd	
"Big Bad Sound"	2000s	Sweet Beat	
"Paradise Lost"	2004	Massive B	
"Higher High"	2004	Conscious Music	
"African Border"	2005	Flash	
"Rumble Jumble Life"	2005	Massive B	
"Free De Herb"	2005	Inkalink	
"1922"	2005	Rashanco	
"Who Say"	2005	Thompson Sound	
"I Feel a Joy"	2005	Massive B	
"Evolution"	2006	Jahspora	
"Dem Nah Do Nuttun"	2006	Run Things	
"This Train"	2006	Diop Side	
"Jah Is the Ruler"	2000s	Koogah Sound	
"Flirt"	2008	Phantom	
"Not a Bwoy Caan Test We"	2008	Sip a Cup	
"Mi Ave a Likkle Sound"	2008	Sip a Cup	
"Missin Africa"	2009	Massive B	
"Chosen One"	2009	Uplift	B-side of Lutan Fyah's "Babylon a Fiss"
