= Ding Dong (reggae musician) =

Jamaican dancehall musician (born 1980)

- Also known as: Ding Dong
- Born: Kemar Christopher Dwaine Ottey; 29 September 1980 (age 46); Kingston, Jamaica
- Origin: Nannyville, Kingston
- Genres: Dancehall; reggae
- Occupations: Singer, songwriter, dancer
- Years active: 2005–present
- Label: Romeich Entertainment
- Website: www.instagram.com/dingdongravers www.facebook.com/dingdongraversja

Kemar Christopher "Ding Dong" Dwaine Ottey (born September 29, 1980) is a Jamaican dancehall reggae musician and dancer. He was a dancer before becoming a dancehall recording artist. His notable songs "Bad Man Forward / Bad Man Pull Up" (2006), "Fling" and "Genna Bounce" (2017) have assisted in his global recognition. He founded the dancing syndicate Ravers Clavers.

== Personal life ==
Kemar Christopher Dwaine Ottey was born at Jubilee Hospital in Kingston, Jamaica, to Denise Bennett and Ferdinand Ottey. Ottey grew up in the community of Nannyville. Raised by his grandmother and aunt after being taken by his father from his mother in Fletchers Land, he was given the name "Ding Dong" by his father and was also affectionately known as "Alla Ding".

At the age of three, Ottey's father died, and he began selling empty alcohol bottles he found at local dance events to assist his struggling family. His precocious hustling laid the foundation for his future success. Ottey has two sons.

== Dancing career ==
Dancing and football were Ding Dong's passions, until the demands of each forced him to choose between them.

In early 2000, he joined the Flatbush Dance crew and spent many days and nights performing for community members and onlookers alike. Dancing soon consumed his life and in 2002, Ding Dong decided to commit his all in this art form, putting football on the back burner.

It was an event called Early Monday in the community of Standpipe where Ding met selector Tony Matterhorn who upon seeing his talent promised to take three days to make him known. Ding became a popular household name in the world of dancing and has since been the creator of numerous dances including Swing Song, Badman Fawad, Part Di Crowd, Chakka Chakka, Flowers a Bloom, Monument, Oh My Swing, Paranoid, and Dip again. Ding also became a main staple in the lyrics of dancing songs over the years. Gerald "Bogle" Levy gave Ding Dong the nod after seeing his skills in various dancehall events.

In early 2003, Ding Dong created the dance group Ravers Clavers with a group of friends. Members have come and gone along the way, but the number remains about 12-13 members. "We have other members that deal with the IT and promotional aspect of business, which put our team up to 16 members," he told Flair. The crew, all inhabitants of the Nannyville community are all talented in their own and have been instrumental in creating popular dances known today, including 'Sivva', 'Shampoo', 'Lebeh Lebeh', 'Lowe Mi', ‘Fling’ and ‘Flairy’. Dance is a way to pass on cultural knowledge through the Dance Syndicate 'Ravers Clavers", Jamaican dancehall dancing culture has been preserved.

Ding Dong claims, "I think I have brought it (dancing) to the forefront again, not just in Jamaica, but across the entire Caribbean. People are dancing to dancehall again in schools, at weddings. Even the Prime Minister is dancing, and that is something I've always wanted to do as a dancer, get the Prime Minister dancing," he said.

== Music career ==
Ding Dong stated that at first he did not take music seriously, now he makes music out of love rather than financial gain. He released his first single "Bad Man Forward Bad Man Pull Up", in 2006. He was also known as "Mr BadMan Forward" because of the dance associated with the title of the record.

Having dabbled in music as a recording artist over the years; he was instrumental in the concept behind the single "Wacky Dip", an ode to the late Gerald "Bogle" Levy performed by dancehall group Voicemail. Ding Dong also made music with the late Danny Champagne and Elephant Man as well as winning several dancing titles.

2009 saw the release of "Holiday", a collaboration with Jamaican singer Chevaughn. Since its release, Ding Dong has continued recording with songs such as "Hustler", "Shampoo", "Wul Up", "Syvah", "Gas", "Lowe Mi", "Fling", "Rock the Floor" (alongside labelmate Shenseea), "Flairy", and "Lebeh Lebeh". He has performed in the US, Europe and the Caribbean, and appeared in Rebel Salute 2018, the first dancer-turned-dancehall artist ever billed for the show in its 24-year history. He has recorded on the BigShip and Emudio labels.

In February 2018, Ding Dong appeared on BBC 1Xtra with the Ravers Clavers, teaching Seani B how to dance at Big Yard Studios, Jamaica.

== Advertising work ==
Social media has enabled musicians like Ding Dong to reach audiences independently Ding Dong is present on his social media platforms and uses his platform to promote his music on platforms such as TikTok.

Grace Foods' brand campaign Flava with a Beat gave Ding Dong a major role as the voice behind the campaign jingle, and his latest dance move, Flairy, became the official dance for the campaign. Other brands he has advertised include; Magnum Tonic Wine, GraceKennedy and Western Union. "It is a blessing, especially for me representing the dancehall community and as a male from the garrison," Ding Dong said. "It shows that it is not where you are from, but how you carry yourself," Ding Dong said. In 2022, Ding Dong launched his clothing brand DNDG. In that same year Magnum Tonic Wine gave him the title chief dancing officer of dancehall.

== Discography ==
- Bad Man Forward / Bad Man Pull Up (2006)
- Skip (2014)
- Shampoo (2014)
- Gas (2015)
- Syvah (2015)
- Fling (2017)
- Flairy (2017)
- Hustler (2017)
- Rock the Floor (2017)
- Dweet (Genna Bounce) (2018)
- Lowe Mi (2018)
- Bounce (2022)
