= Anthony Red Rose =

Jamaican singer (born 63)

- Born: Anthony Cameron c. 19 December 1962 (age 63); St. Mary, Jamaica
- Genres: Dancehall
- Years active: 1985–present

Anthony Cameron (born 19 December c. 1962), better known as Anthony Red Rose, is a Jamaican singjay.

== Biography ==
Born in St. Mary, Cameron initially recorded under the name Tony Rose, adopting 'Anthony Red Rose' to avoid confusion with roots reggae singer, Michael Rose, who at the time also performed under the name Tony Rose. He was one of the first artists to record at the studio that King Tubby opened in the mid-1980s, and had a huge hit in Jamaica in 1985 with "Tempo", which followed "Under Mi Fat Thing", another take on Prince Jammy's and Wayne Smith (musician) "Sleng Teng" riddim. He continued to have further hit singles in the 1980s and 1990s and released the albums Anthony Red Rose Will Make You Dance in 1986 and Family Man in 1994 on VP Records, as well as split albums with Papa San and King Kong.

In the 1990s he began working as a producer together with Anthony Malvo, setting up the 'How Yu Fi Say Dat' label and working with artists such as Beenie Man, Red Dragon, and Simpleton. As the decade saw the rise of Jungle music, "Tempo" enjoyed a rebirth when it was remixed in Jungle fashion.

== Discography ==
- Anthony Red Rose Will Make You Dance (1986), Firehouse
- Family Man (1994), VP
- Good Friends Better Than Pocket Money (2003), 2B1
- My Name Is Red Rose (2008), Red Rose

Split albums

- Frontline: Papa San Meets Anthony Red Rose (1986), Weed Beat - with Papa San
- King Tubbys Presents Two Big Bull in a One Pen (1986), Firehouse - with King Kong
