= Singjay =

Jamaican style of reggae vocals

Singjaying is a Jamaican style of reggae vocals combining toasting and singing in an elastic format that encourages rhythmically compelling and texturally impressive vocal embellishments. The performer is called a singjay, a combination of singer and deejay.

The fusion of singing and deejaying occurred early in reggae music. Artists like Big Youth combined singing and toasting on tracks like "Sky Juice", "Every Negro Is a Star" and "Hit the Road Jack". However, the term "singjay" more accurately describes the transition from singer to deejay, rather than deejay to singer. This phenomenon happened years after the deejay style had gone mainstream. Among the earliest performers of what would later be known as singjaying is Michael Rose, who used to integrate highly rhythmic but completely meaningless deejay "scatting" in his roots songs. As the rhythm of reggae changed in the late 1970s and became what is now known as "rockers" style reggae, the themes changed as well. The classic roots themes were slowly being replaced by songs inspired by life at the dancehall. A change in vocal delivery accompanied this thematic change. Artists such as Echo Minott and Little John represent this "rockers" singjay style. Half Pint, known mostly for his "lovers" style, incorporated a singjay vocal style into his classic hit "Greetings". Around the mid-'80s, the singjay style became the dominant and mainstream form of expression in Jamaican music. Dennis Alcapone, Prince Hammer, Prince Jazzbo, Dillinger, Clint Eastwood, Trinity, U Brown, U-Roy, I-Roy, Eek-A-Mouse, Anthony Red Rose, King Kong, Pinchers, Wayne Smith, Courtney Melody, Conroy Smith, Lilly Melody, Eccleton Jarrett, Nitty Gritty and Yami Bolo are all original singjays. Today's singjays include artists such as Shalkal Carty, Mr. Vegas, and Mavado, among others.
