= David Isaacs (singer) =

- Born: 9 June 1946; Denham Town, Kingston, Jamaica
- Died: December 2009 (aged 63) Denham Town, Kingston, Jamaica
- Genres: Reggae
- Instrument: Vocals
- Years active: 1960s–2000s
- Labels: Trojan, Culture Press

David Isaacs (9 June 1946 – c. 21 December 2009) was a Jamaican reggae singer who worked with Lee "Scratch" Perry in the late 1960s and early 1970s, and went on to release several albums between the mid-1970s and early 1980s.

== Biography ==
Isaacs was born in Denham Town in 1946, and was the first of 16 children for his mother. Isaacs recorded a version of Stevie Wonder's "A Place in the Sun" in 1968 for producer Lee Perry, and this was one of the records that established Trojan Records as a major force in reggae. The song was later re-recorded and included in Isaacs' album Place in the Sun, issued in the 1980s.

In 1979, Isaacs recorded "Just Like a Sea", in combination with Roots Radics and deejay Jah Thomas, and released his debut album of the same name (also issued as More Love), produced by Witty Reid. In 1982, he teamed up with Winston "Niney" Holness for the album Happy Ending, released on Dynamic Sounds, which had been preceded by the Love & Devotion set.

Isaacs also toured extensively with The Itals, as Lloyd Ricketts was unable to tour. In 1987, upon the nomination of the Itals for the American Grammy Awards, David toured extensively with the Itals line up of Keith Porter and Ronnie Davis. This line-up would continue for over two decades, and the last tour was in 2009, with a cross-country tour that ended in the fall. Because Lloyd Ricketts was unable to get a visa for all of these years, David supported the three-part harmony, and added his own special qualities. The "Itals" also toured without Ronnie Davis often, as Keith Porter, living in the United States did try various line-ups, including his family to perform under the "Itals" name. However, over the course of time, the importance of having David Isaacs and Ronnie Davis tour with the band became known by audience response. David Isaacs toured more over the years than Ronnie Davis or, of course, Lloyd Ricketts because he did work with Keith Porter when Keith Porter was promoting the Itals as his particular line-up which consisted of his daughter and usually included David Isaacs.

Articles in the Gleaner and other places are reporting that David Isaacs along with his great personal achievements did a "brief stint" with the Itals, however that brief stint was over two decades, and his contributions to the Itals touring group cannot be described as brief.

Isaacs died in December 2009. His sister Beverley found him dead at their Denham Town home on the morning of 21 December.

== Discography ==
=== Singles ===
- "I'd Rather Be Lonely" (1966), BMN/Island
- "See That Man" (1966), BMN/Island
- "Place in the Sun" (1968), Upsetter/Trojan
- "Give Me Your Love" (1968), Supersonics – Alton Ellis & David Isaacs
- "Good Father" (1968), Upsetter
- "Can't Take It Anymore" (1969), Upsetter
- "Give Love a Try" (1969), Upsetter
- "He'll Have To Go" (1969), Upsetter
- "I'm Leaving (on a Jet Plane)" (1969), Upsetter
- "I've Got Memories" (1969), Upsetter
- "Since You are Gone" (1969), Jackpot/Upsetter
- "Knock Three Times" (1971), Punch
- "Dark Moon"
- "Good Father"
- "Love Has Joined Us Together" (1971), Jackpot
- "Who To Tell"
- "You'll Be Sorry" (1971), Upsetter/Punch
- "Just Enough" (1973), Upset/Bread
- "We Are Neighbors" (1973), Upset/Bread
- "Stranger on the Shore" (1973), Justice League/Upsetter
- "Breaking Up" (1975), Hulk
- "You'll Be Sorry" (1975), Sunshot
- "Hard Road to Travel" (1977), Roots From The Yard
- "Seems I'm Losing You" (1977), VP
- "Think That You're Smart", Roots Rock International
- "I Went to Your Wedding" (1978), Ossie Sounds
- "Linger Awhile" (1978), Hulk
- "Just Like a Sea" (1978). Moodisc
- "Just Like A Sea" (1978), Cartridge/Errol T/Steppers (with Jah Thomas)
- "Place in the Sun" (1978), Rattie Soul/Jama
- "More Love" (1979), Errol T/Cartridge
- "More Love", Steppers
- "We've Got to Make It", Steppers
- "Hush Not a Word to Mary" (1979), Music Cave
- "She Loves Me Now" 12" (19??), Striker Lee
- "Love Me With All Your Heart" (1979), Bushays – with Trinity
- "Sometimes When We Touch", Top Rankin' Muzik
- "Jah Love I" (1979), Wild Flower
- "What You Gonna Do" (1979), Gorgon
- "Brand New Style" (19??), New Star
- "Bye My Love" (1981), Express
- "Just Like a Sea" (1981), Deep Groove
- "Margaret" (1981), Deep Groove
- "I'm Gonna Get You", Errol T
- "Just Like a Sea" (19??), Rattie Soul
- "Sitting and Watching", Carl's
- "Words", Carl's
- "Someone New Dancing With You", Jackpot
- "You Got To Come Home Back", Lucky Star

=== Albums ===
- Just Like a Sea (1979), Steppers – also issued as More Love (1979), J&M
- Love & Devotion (1981), Imperial
- Happy Ending (1982), Dynamic Sounds
- Place in the Sun (1984), Culture Press, also released as Til I Can't Take It on Hulk
- To Sir With Love, Jamaica Authentic
