= King Isaac =

Zimbabwean singer (born 1965)

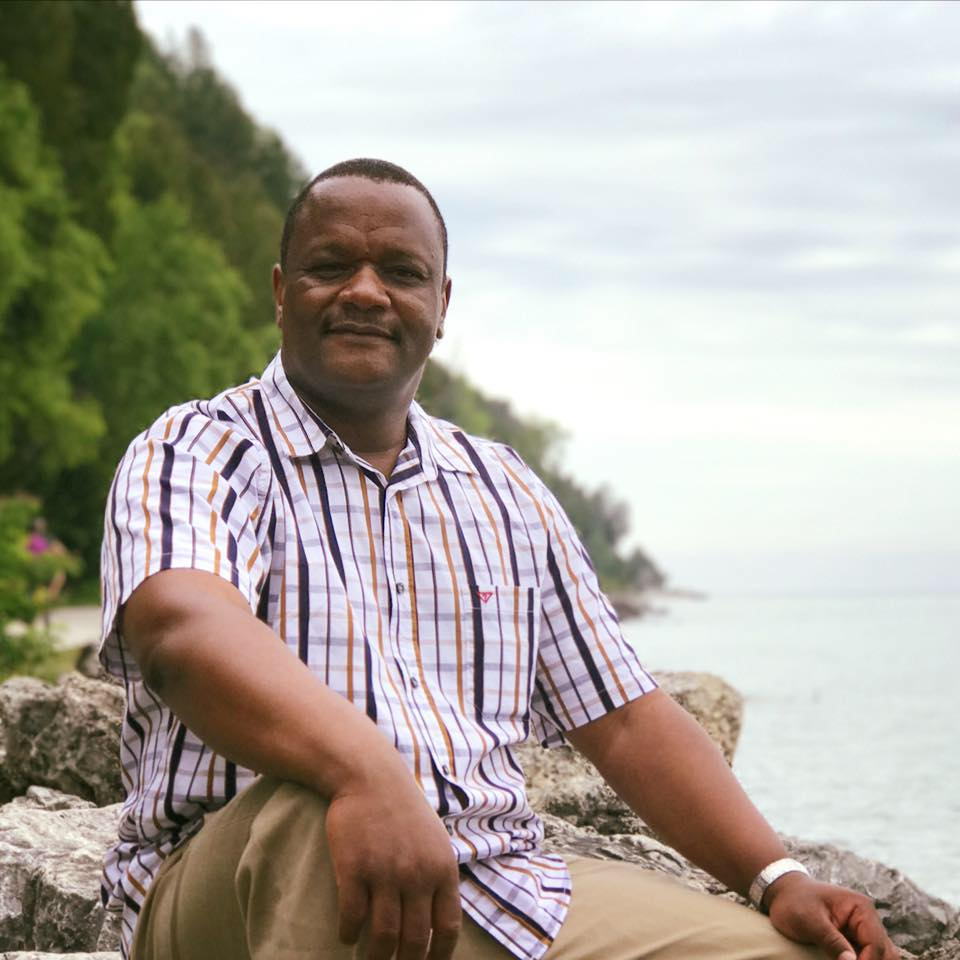

Background information
- Born: Isaac Gabriel Kalumbu; 1965 (age 60–61); Harare, Zimbabwe
- Genres: Reggae
- Occupations: singer; songwriter; professor of ethnomusicology

King Isaac (born Isaac Gabriel Kalumbu; 1965) is a Zimbabwean reggae singer, songwriter and a professor of ethnomusicology, now working in administration, at Michigan State University, United States. As a lyricist, his music revolves around love, spirituality, and promotes the pursuit of peaceable living amongst the various peoples of the world. During the singer's first visit to Jamaica in 1998, the name "King Isaac" was bestowed upon him by Joseph “Bragga” Russell, a former aide of Bob Marley at the Bob Marley Museum.

== Early life ==
King Isaac was born Isaac Gabriel Kalumbu in the high-density suburb of Mufakose, in Harare, Zimbabwe in 1965. His family moved to Gweru when he was six years old. He started writing poems at the age of 14. At about the same time, the censorship of reggae was lifted in Zimbabwe when the nation attained independence in 1980. Subsequent visits to Zimbabwe by reggae stars such as Bob Marley, Jimmy Cliff, Gregory Isaacs and Dennis Brown helped to fuel Kalumbu's love for reggae music. He has explained that "At around that time, Bob Marley came to Zimbabwe, and he was followed by many other reggae acts including Jimmy Cliff, Gregory Isaacs, Aswad, UB40, Dennis Brown, Culture, I Jah Man, Eric Donaldson, Don Carlos and many others. Reggae was the in-thing when I was young and impressionable. Singers like Peter Tosh, Sugar Minott, and Bunny Wailer were played on the radio. We heard the best reggae, so it was natural to be drawn to this ‘new’ music." The young poet soon turned to writing lyrics for songs, and by the mid to late 1980's, he was singing in local reggae bands. In 1986 he recorded his first song, "Simuka," a reggae piece about the liberation struggle in South Africa. At the same time he was studying at the University of Zimbabwe and in 1987, earned a bachelor's degree in Economic History and History. In January 1991, Kalumbu left Zimbabwe to study at Indiana University Bloomington, United States. Although he was interested in an academic career, Kalumbu also knew that a move to the USA would bring him closer to Jamaica and to the reggae world at large.

== Music career ==
Upon arrival in the United States, he immediately formed a reggae band named Zimbeggae (Zimbabwe + reggae). The group performed in many venues in Indiana, focusing on both original and cover material, and King Isaac wrote and recorded several more original songs. Later, in 1993, he received an Master of Arts in ethnomusicology from Indiana University. In 1997 he was appointed to the faculty at Michigan State University in East Lansing, Michigan. His continuing graduate education culminated in his earning a Ph.D. in Folklore/Ethnomusicology in 1999 from Indiana University. In the meantime, King Isaac reached a milestone in his singing career when reggae music promoter Gwen Clemens introduced him to Leroy Sibbles, for whom he opened up shows in 1998 in Detroit, Michigan, United States. That same year he embarked on his first pilgrimage to reggae's Mecca, Kingston, Jamaica to make his first recordings there, thus fulfilling a long-held dream. Since then, King Isaac has visited Jamaica at least once a year.

Between 1999 and 2001, veteran bassist Danny “Axeman” Thompson and King Isaac collaborated on the King's self-titled debut album, which was released in Zimbabwe in 2002. Riding on the success of his first album, King Isaac recorded a new album that was released in Zimbabwe in 2004. This album, "Munokokwa Mese," was recorded mostly in Zimbabwe and featured a mixture of various Southern African musical styles and reggae; sung in the local Shona and Ndebele languages, and English. In December 2004, King Isaac was invited by veteran singer Sugar Minott to perform at Minott's annual, "Reggae in The Hills" concert in St Catherine Parish. This crowd response was rewarding and reassuring. It was during this same trip that Kalumbu met Gregory Isaacs, with whom he would begin recording music the following year. In October 2005, he returned to Jamaica to deliver a paper on the contribution of Peter Tosh to the Southern African liberation struggle at the University of the West Indies, and to perform at the international annual Peter Tosh Commemoration Concert in Kingston. Both appearances were received positively.

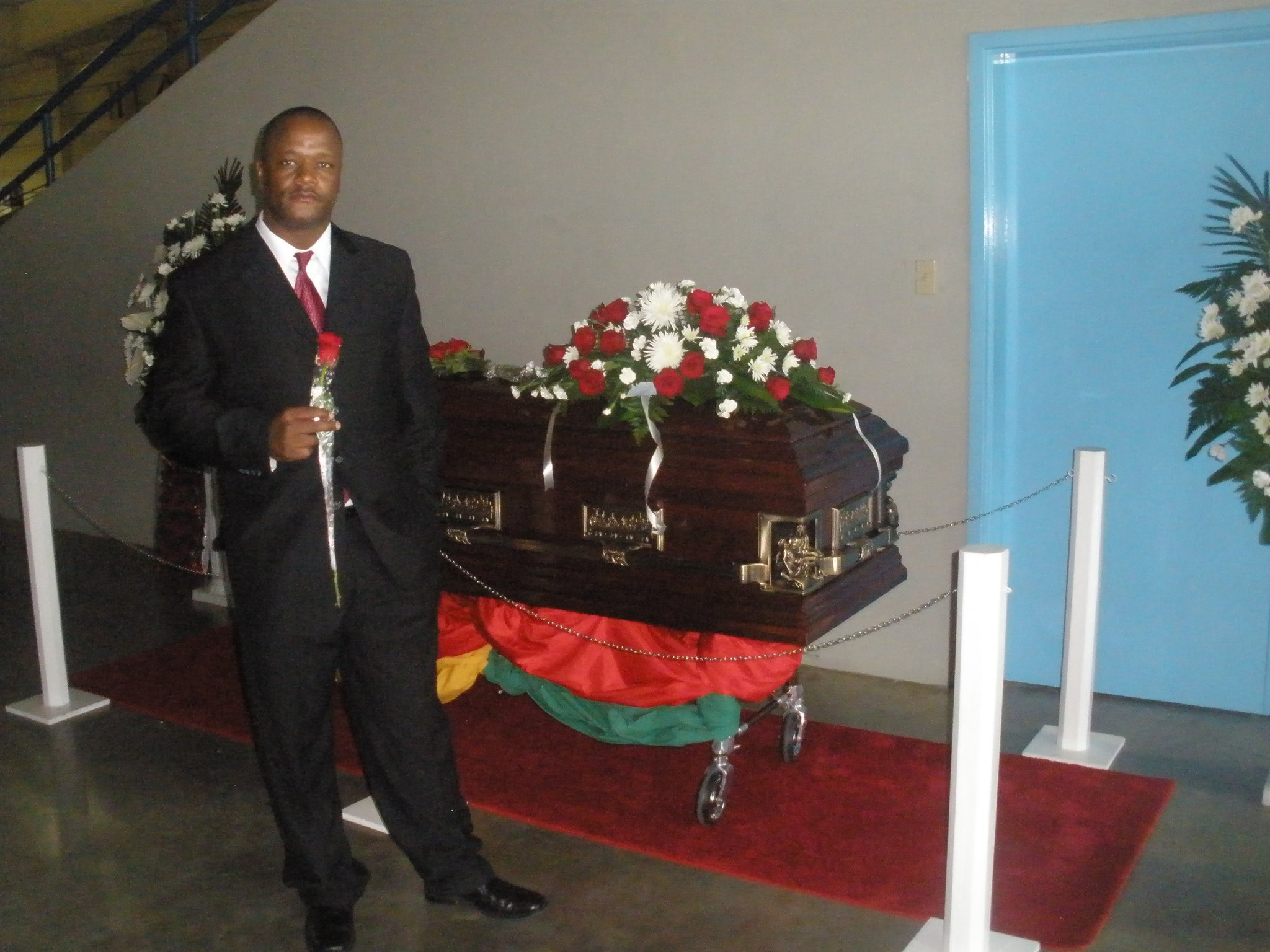
King Isaac at Gregory Isaacs's Funeral, November 20, 2010

In the summers of 2005 and 2006, Kalumbu traveled to Kingston Jamaica, where he worked with many veteran reggae artists, including Gregory Isaacs, Dean Fraser and the legendary U Roy. These recordings culminated in King Isaac's third album, Legends of Reggae Present King Isaac, which contains a special appearance by South Africa's royal ladies of song, the Mahotella Queens.

Since then, King Isaac has released a string of other albums, namely Love of All Senses (2008), Isaacs Meets Isaac with Gregory Isaacs (2010), and Here I Go Again (2011.) The 2010 album Isaacs Meets Isaac, collaborated on with the legendary Gregory Isaacs, was nominated for a GRAMMY Award in the best Reggae Album category. Released the same year Gregory Isaacs died, the collaborative album was the final released offering in his extensive discography. King Isaac has recalled how, prior to recording with Gregory Isaacs, many had been skeptical. "People were always discouraging me, saying he would never show up for (recording) sessions. They said he was moody," Kalumbu said. The recordings, however, went ahead without a hitch. King Isaac described how, in August 2010—at the album's release and two months before Gregory Isaacs's passing—the legendary Jamaican crooner had told him "he liked the songs" and that this had "really boosted my confidence"

King Isaac released his seventh album entitled Makuwerere (King Isaac's Coat of Many Colours) in 2019, which reflects on his musical journey. Recorded in three countries – Jamaica, United States and Zimbabwe – King Isaac's offering is also a celebration of the singer/crooner's achievements as a musician, pastor and mentor. Leroy Sibbles, as well as Zimbabwean music producer, composer, and multi-instrumentalist Mono Mukundu and Kalumbu are the three producers behind this project.

Early in 2021, King Isaac released two singles. The first one, 'Mugore Wangye', is an afrobeat tune that blends Kinyarwanda, Swahili, Shona, Ndebele/Zulu, and English. The video for the song was shot in Uganda. The second single,"Ida Inini", is a collaboration with veteran Zimbabwean dancehall chanter, Edwin 'Potato' Mbatatisi. Later that year, he released the single and video, 'Chimhandara/Partner for Life." Both 'Chimhandara/Partner for Life" and 'Mugore Wangye' featured on the Classic 263 End of Year Top 50 charts for 2021, coming in at 44 and 26 respectively.

In 2022, King Isaac released three singles: "The Score", a January release on which he collaborated with Jamaican chanter Chaka Demus, and was produced by Leroy Sibbles; 'Uye Uye', a love song released on Valentine's Day; and "Rova Ngoma", a Jiti song released in October. On that year's Classic 263 End of Year Top 50 Chart, three songs from King Isaac charted. "The Score" came first on the annual chart, while "Uye Uye" was number four. In addition, "Chimhandara (Partner for Life.)", which had been released and also charted the previous year, came in at number 35. With three songs, King Isaac had the most songs on the year-end chart.

In February 2023, King Isaac released his eight studio album, 'Love Talk', with previously released singles "The Score" and "Uye Uye" among the 12 album songs. In July 2023, he released the anti-drug anthem and video 'Usatore Mutoriro,' which was accompanied by five versions of the music video: the original, and four versions with subtitles in English, French, Swahili, and Zulu. The song would go on to top the annual Classic 263 charts in 2024, after having also charted in 2023. In February 2024, King Isaac continued in his four-year tradition of love-centered Valentine's Day releases, debuting "Time for Love", a collaboration with Zimbabwean songstress Nicholar, and "Mukoma Woye", a jiti single.

After releasing a string of singles, including Humbe Kumbe, Manyati, Jesus is Great, and Ndayesera to begin 2025, King Isaac released the album, "Zvaida Kutendwa" in June 2025. The album combined many of these earlier singles, as well as earlier ones such as "Usatore Mutoriro" and "Chimhandara (Partner for Life.)"

== Discography ==
=== Albums ===
- King Isaac (2002)
- Munokokwa Mese (2004)
- Legends of Reggae present King Isaac (2006)
- Love of All Senses (2008)
- Isaacs Meets Isaac (2010)
- Here I Go Again (2011)
- Makuwerere! King Isaac's Coat of Many Colours (2018)
- Love Talk (2023)
- Zvaida Kutendwa (2025)

=== Select singles ===
- King Isaac- Mugore Wangye (2021)
- King Isaac & Potato- Ida Inini (2021)
- King Isaac- Chimhandara (Partner for Life) (2021)
- King Isaac & Chaka Demus- The Score (2022)
- King Isaac- Uye Uye (2022)
- King Isaac- Rova Ngoma (2022)
- King Isaac- Usatore Mutoriro (2023)
- King Isaac & Nicholar- Time for Love (2024)
- King Isaac- Mukoma Woye (2024.)
- King Isaac- Humbe Kumbe (2025)
- King Isaac- Manyati (2025)
- King Isaac - Jesus Christ is Great (2025)
