= Gregory Isaacs =

Jamaican reggae musician (1950–2010)

Gregory Isaacs OD
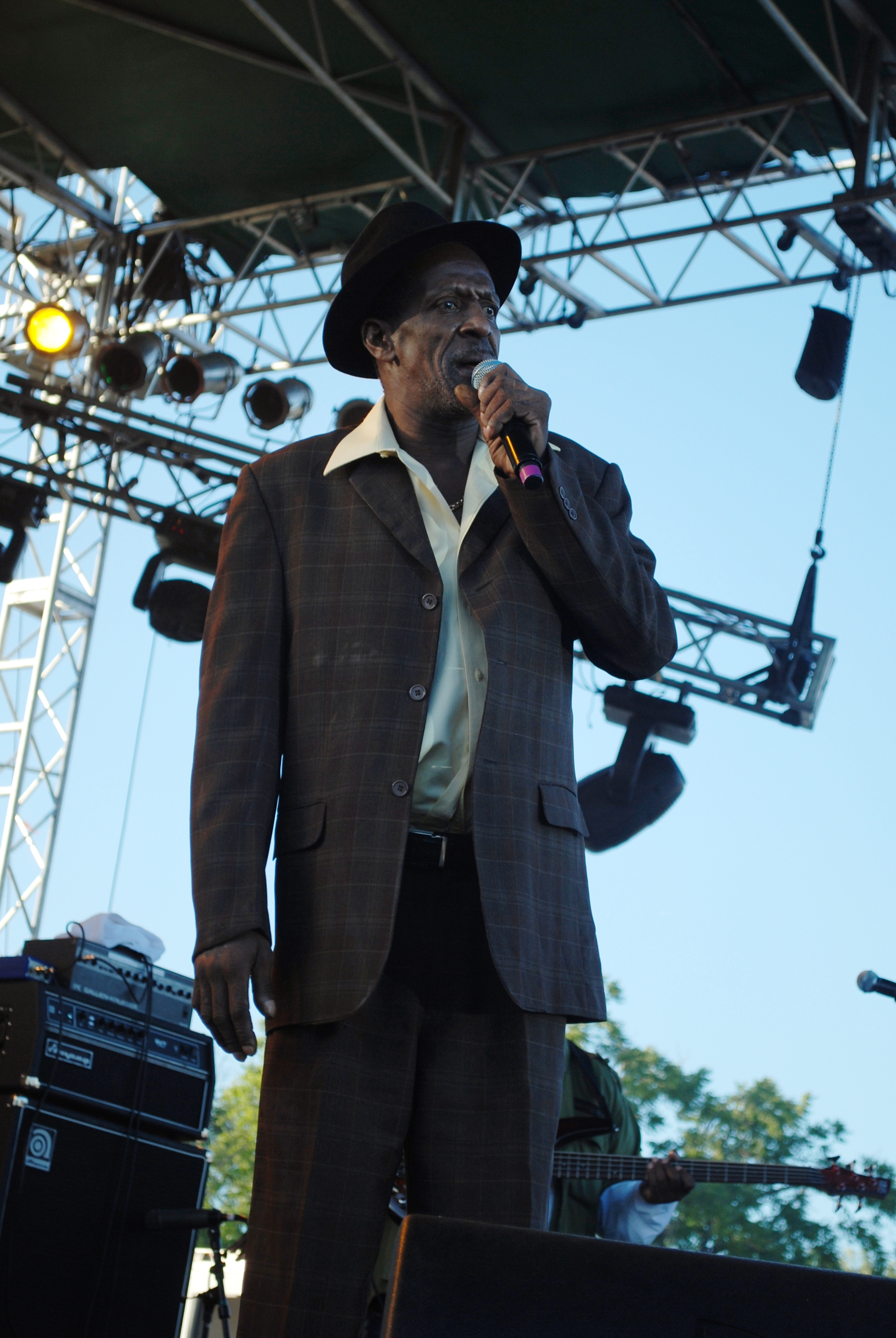
- Isaacs performing at the Sierra Nevada World Music Festival in June 2010

Background information
- Also known as: Cool Ruler; Lonely Lover
- Born: Gregory Anthony Isaacs; 15 July 1950; Kingston, Jamaica
- Died: 25 October 2010 (aged 60) London, England
- Genres: Reggae; lovers' rock; dub
- Occupations: Singer; songwriter
- Years active: 1968–2010
- Labels: African Museum; Cash and Carry; Trojan; VP; RAS

Gregory Anthony Isaacs OD (15 July 1950 – 25 October 2010) was a Jamaican reggae musician. Milo Miles, writing in The New York Times, described Isaacs as "the most exquisite vocalist in reggae".

== Early career ==
In his teenage years, Isaacs became a veteran of the talent contests that regularly took place in Jamaica. In 1968, he made his recording debut as Winston Sinclair, with the single "Another Heartache", recorded for producer Byron Lee. The single sold poorly and Isaacs went on to team up with Errol Dunkley to start the African Museum record label and shop, and soon had a hit with "My Only Lover", credited as the first lovers' rock record ever made. He recorded for other producers to finance further African Museum recordings, having a string of hits in the three years that followed, ranging from ballads to roots reggae, including "All I Have Is Love", "Lonely Soldier", "Black a Kill Black", "Extra Classic" and his cover version of Dobby Dobson's "Loving Pauper". In 1974, he began working with producer Alvin Ranglin, and that year he had his first Jamaican no. 1 single with "Love Is Overdue".

Isaacs recorded for many of Jamaica's top producers during the 1970s, including Winston "Niney" Holness, Gussie Clarke ("My Time"), Lloyd Campbell ("Slavemaster"), Glen Brown ("One One Coco"), Harry Mudie, Roy Cousins, Sydney Crooks and Lee "Scratch" Perry ("Mr. Cop"). By the late 1970s, Isaacs was among the most prominent reggae performers, touring the US and the UK, and performing alongside Dennis Brown and Bob Marley. Between 1977 and 1978, Isaacs again teamed up with Alvin Ranglin, recording a string of hits including "Border" and "Number One" for Ranglin's GG's label.

He opened the Cash and Carry shop at 118 Orange Street, later moving to no. 125, next door to Prince Buster's Record Shack, which was also the base for the Cash and Carry record label that he ran with Trevor "Leggo" Douglas.

== 1980s-1990s career ==
In 1978, Isaacs signed with Virgin Records’ offshoot Front Line Records, and appeared in the film Rockers, in which he performed "Slavemaster". The Cool Ruler (which became one of his nicknames) and Soon Forward albums failed to sell as well as expected, although they are now considered among his best work. In 1981, he made his first appearance at the Reggae Sunsplash festival (returning annually until 1991), and he moved on to the Charisma Records offshoot Pre, who released his The Lonely Lover and More Gregory albums along with a string of increasingly successful singles including "Tune In", "Permanent Lover", "Wailing Rudie" and "Tribute to Waddy". He signed to Island Records and released the record that broke through to a wider audience, "Night Nurse", the title track from his first album for the label (Night Nurse (1982)). Although "Night Nurse" was not a chart hit in either the UK or US, it was popular in clubs and received heavy radio play, and the album reached number 32 in the UK. It was also used in adverts for an over the counter cold & flu remedy of the same name.

This success for Isaacs coincided with problems with cocaine. He served a six-month prison sentence in Kingston in 1982 for possession of unlicensed firearms. Isaacs claimed that he had the weapons only for protection, but it emerged that this was his 27th arrest and that he had become involved in drug dealing and was addicted to crack cocaine. He celebrated his release from prison with his second album for Island, Out Deh! (1983). Yellowman wrote the song "Gregory Free" also celebrating Isaacs's release, and was later featured on the Young, Gifted and Yellow album. He was featured in the 1982 documentary Land of Look Behind.

When his contract with Island ended, Isaacs returned in 1984 with the "Kool Ruler Come Again" single, and began a period of prolific recording, working with producers including Prince Jammy, Hugh "Redman" James, Bobby Digital, Tad Dawkins and Steely & Clevie, while continuing to release a large volume of work. Isaacs then built a strong relationship with Gussie Clarke of the Music Works label. They began with Isaacs's 1985 album Private Beach Party, and had a hit with "Rumours" in 1988, which was followed by further popular singles including "Mind Yu Dis", "Rough Neck", "Too Good To Be True" and "Report to Me". The association with Clarke continued into the early 1990s, teaming up with singers including Freddie McGregor, Ninjaman and J.C. Lodge. He dueted with Beres Hammond on the 1993 Philip "Fatis" Burrell-produced "One Good Turn", Burrell also producing Isaacs's 1994 album Midnight Confidential.

In the 1990s, the African Museum label continued to release all of Isaacs's music, and that of artists he produced. In 1997 Simply Red covered "Night Nurse". Isaacs continued to record and perform live in the 2000s. In 2005 Lady Saw produced another version of "Night Nurse" with her toasting over the original lyrics.

His drug use had a significant impact on his health, and Isaacs later stated that he lost most of his teeth as a result Isaacs said of his addiction in 2007: "Drugs are a debasing weapon. It was the greatest college ever, but the most expensive school fee ever paid – the Cocaine High School. I learnt everything, and now I've put it on the side."

He performed at the ICC Cricket World Cup 2007 Inauguration at Jamaica, and in 2007 he collaborated with the Spanish rap group Flowklorikos/Rafael Lechowski album Donde Duele Inspira.

In 2008, Isaacs released a new studio album, Brand New Me, which was nominated for the Grammy Awards for 2010. The album received positive reviews from critics; Reggae Vibes wrote: "Gregory is back, and how! 'Brand New Me' is a very suitable album title for the cool ruler's new album. He is back in a different style, more or less like we were used to from this great 'lovers & roots' artist". This was followed in 2009 by the album My Kind Of Lady.

In 2010, Isaacs put out the last of his albums to be released while he was still living: Isaacs Meets Isaac, with Zimbabwean reggae singer King Isaac. In November 2010, Isaacs Meets Isaac was nominated for Best Reggae Album for the 2011 Grammy Awards, Isaacs's fourth Grammy nomination, and King Isaac's first.

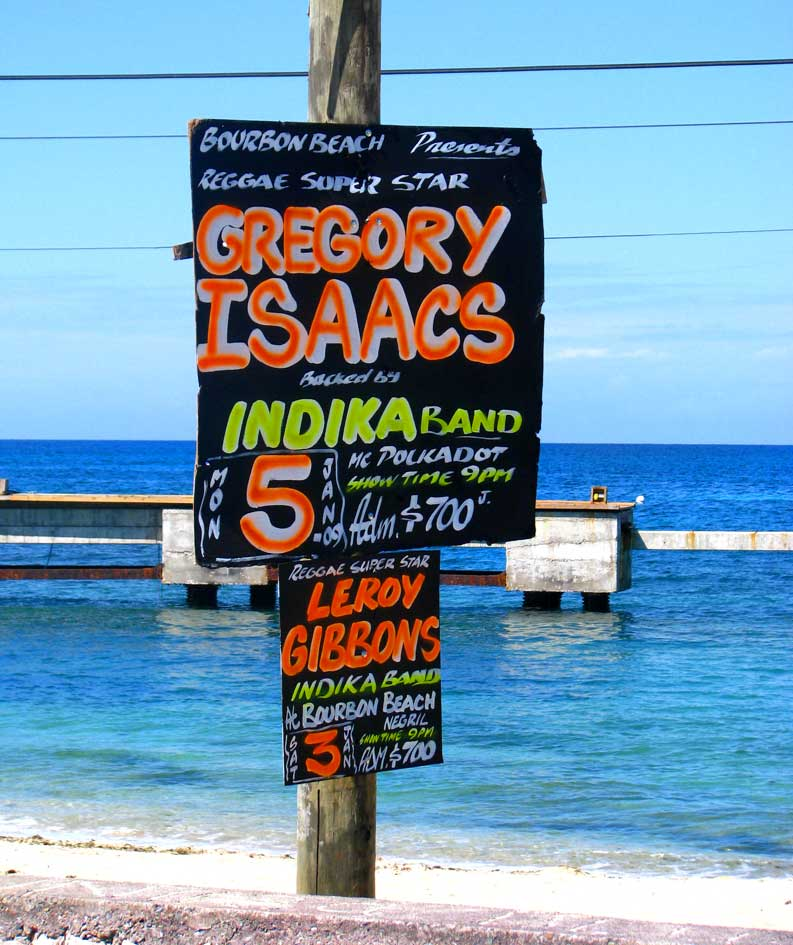
An advertisement for a Gregory Isaacs concert in Negril, 2009

== Death ==
Isaacs died of lung cancer on 25 October 2010 at his home in Harrow Weald, London. A memorial service was held on 20 November at Kingston's National Indoor Sports Centre, including a musical tribute from artists including Lloyd Parks and We the People Band, Ken Boothe, Freddie McGregor, Shaggy, Judy Mowatt, Mavado, the Tamlins and Bongo Herman, before his remains were interred at Dovecot Memorial Park & Crematorium.

== Legacy ==
The Gregory Isaacs Foundation was set up on 15 July 2011 (Isaacs's birthday) by his wife June Wyndham, with the intention of continuing his charitable work. A year later a free concert was staged featuring artists such as U-Roy, Big Youth, and the Mighty Diamonds, to raise funds for two schools.

In July 2015, a mural by Junior Moore depicting Isaacs was unveiled at 125 Orange Street, the former site of his Cash and Carry shop and now the Leggo Recording Studios. The unveiling also saw the launch of "Cool Ruler" spring water.

In 2016, the Jamaican government announced that it would posthumously award Isaacs the Order of Distinction (Officer Class) in recognition of his contribution to the country's music.

In October 2016 the UK branch of the Gregory Isaacs Foundation installed a commemorative blue plaque at 59 Weald Lane, Harrow, the house where Isaacs lived for the last three years of his life, with his British wife Linda Diane Isaacs (16.01.1948 - 21.06.2023). It was Linda's house, her son and grandchildren still live there. In February 2018, a blue plaque was unveiled at Isaacs's former home at 15 Sunrise Crescent in St. Andrew, with the foundation also announcing plans to open a museum dedicated to Isaacs at the site.

== Discography ==
=== Solo albums ===
More than 500 Gregory Isaacs albums have been released to date, a great many of them being compilations of previously released material. Only studio albums of original material are listed below:

- 1974: In Person (Trojan)
- 1976: All I Have Is Love (Trojan)
- 1977: Extra Classic (African Museum)
- 1977: Mr Isaacs (DEB)
- 1978: Cool Ruler (Front Line)
- 1978: Slum (Gregory Isaacs in Dub) (Burning Sounds)
- 1978: The Best of Gregory Isaacs (GG's)
- 1979: Soon Forward (Front Line)
- 1979: Gregory Isaacs Meets Ronnie Davis (Plant), with Ronnie Davis
- 1980: Showcase (Taxi)
- 1980: Lonely Lover (Pre)
- 1981: More Gregory (Pre)
- 1982: Night Nurse (Island/Mango)
- 1983: The Sensational Gregory Isaacs (Vista)
- 1983: Out Deh! (Island/Mango)
- 1984: Let's Go Dancing
- 1985: Judge Not (Greensleeves), with Dennis Brown
- 1985: Private Beach Party (Greensleeves & RAS)
- 1985: Easy (Tad's)
- 1986: Double Dose (Blue Trac), with Sugar Minott
- 1987: All I Have is Love Love Love (Tad's)
- 1987: Victim (VP)
- 1987: Watchman of the City (Rohit)
- 1988: Come Along (Live & Love)
- 1988: Red Rose for Gregory (Greensleeves & RAS)
- 1989: Warning (Firehouse)
- 1989: Feature Attraction (VP for Mixing Lab Records)
- 1989: No Contest (Greensleeves & VP), with Dennis Brown
- 1989: I.O.U. (Greensleeves & RAS)
- 1990: Dancing Floor (Heartbeat)
- 1990: Call Me Collect (RAS)
- 1991: Set Me Free (VP, Digital B & Vine Yard)
- 1991: No Intention (VP)
- 1991: Boom Shot (Shanachie)
- 1991: State of Shock (RAS)
- 1991: Past and Future (VP)
- 1992: Pardon Me! (RAS)
- 1992: Cooyah! (label unknown)
- 1992: Can't Stay Away (VP & Xterminator)
- 1992: Rudie Boo (Star Trail)
- 1993: Unattended // Absent (Pow Wow & Greensleeves)
- 1993: Unlocked (RAS)
- 1994: Midnight Confidential (Greensleeves for Xterminator Records)
- 1995: Dreaming (Heartbeat)
- 1995: Not a One Man Thing (RAS)
- 1996: Private Lesson (Heartbeat)
- 1996: Come Closer
- 1996: Mr. Cool (VP)
- 1996: Maximum Respect (House of Reggae)
- 1997: Hold Tight (Heartbeat)
- 1997: Hardcore Hits (Ikus)
- 1997: Dance Curfew (Acid Jazz), with Dread Flimstone
- 1998: Kingston 14 Denham Town (Jamaican Vibes)
- 1998: Do Lord (Xterminator)
- 1997: Happy As A King (Raven)
- 1999: New Dance (Prestige)
- 1999: Turn Down The Lights (Artists Only)
- 2000: So Much Love (Joe Gibbs Music)
- 2000: Future Attraction (VP)
- 2000: Father & Son (2B1 – Gregory Isaacs & Son)
- 2002: It Go Now (2B1)
- 2003: Here By Appointment (Jet Star Music)
- 2004: Life's Lonely Road
- 2004: Give It All Up (Heartbeat)
- 2004: One 2 One Volume 2 (High Power Music, VP Records), with (George Nooks)
- 2004: Rat Patrol (African Museum)
- 2004: Masterclass (Greensleeves for Blacker Dread Records)
- 2005: Gregory Isaacs Sings Dennis Brown( Sanctuary Records Group LTD)
- 2005: Revenge (P.O.T.)
- 2005: Substance Free (Vizion Sounds)
- 2006: Come Take My Hand (Mun Mun)
- 2007: Gregory Isaacs In Dub
- 2007: Substance Free
- 2008: Hold Tight (Mafia & Fluxy)
- 2008: Brand New Me (African Museum)
- 2009: My Kind of Lady (Rude Productions)
- 2010: Isaacs Meets Isaac, with King Isaac (King Isaac Music)

=== Remix albums ===
- 2023: Rebirth of the Cool Ruler (VP)
