= Mister Yellowman =

Studio album by Yellowman
- Released: October 1982
- Studio: Channel One
- Genre: Reggae
- Length: 37:38
- Label: Greensleeves
- Producer: Henry "Junjo" Lawes

Yellowman chronology
Mister Yellowman (1982)	Zungguzungguguzungguzeng (1983)

Mister Yellowman is the debut studio album by the Jamaican reggae and dancehall deejay Yellowman.

In October 1982 it was released as Mister Yellowman in the United Kingdom by Greensleeves Records and as Duppy or Gunman in Jamaica by Jah Guidance / VP Records, also in 1982.

== Critical reception ==
Professional ratings
Review scores
Source	Rating
AllMusic	4.5/5 stars
The Encyclopedia of Popular Music	4/5 stars

A 1982 review in Billboard states "Yellowman strips reggae down to the minimum here. The vocals are rapped almost as much as sung, whilst the instrumentation is down to almost the rhythm track. This bare bones approach works a lot better than one would think, primarily because Yellowman, who is getting better known all the time, has the presence and innate sense of rhythm and song to make it work."

Jo-Ann Greene in AllMusic wrote "Mister Yellowman was the DJ's first album with Lawes, and remains one of his best. Backed by the seminal Roots Radics and Earl "Chinna" Smith's Hi Times band, the deep roots that both created were further finessed by Lawes into a simmering stew of dancehall-inflected rhythms shot through with dub. Yellowman spoke directly to the lives of regular Jamaicans while effortlessly riding the rootsy rhythms. Today overshadowed by many of his contemporaries, Mister sets the record straight; a masterly DJ set that just can't be beat."

Harry Hawks, from ReggaeCollector.com, wrote: "In 1982, at the height of his fame, he released more albums than Bob Marley had put out in his entire career and his plethora of albums, seven and twelve inch singles can prove very confusing to a newcomer to Yellowman's oeuvre. His most accomplished and consistent studio work was with Henry 'Junjo' Lawes and their 1982 album 'Mister Yellowman', released on Greensleeves in London, began to establish his reputation beyond the confines of Jamaica's dance halls."

Pat Gilbert and the Mojo staff listed the album at number 45 of MOJO's 50 greatest reggae albums. They wrote: "Sometimes ridiculous, often very rude but always mesmerising dancehall classic from albino JA star."

Bud Kliment and Amy Wachtel in Trouser Press state that "Mister Yellowman, the album that helped launch his international fame, remains among his best. Nearly every cut is strong, including "Mister Chin," "Two to Six Supermix" and the My Fair Lady-inspired "Yellowman Getting Married" (in the morning). While they often come close, none of his other records equal this consistency and easy versatility."

Pitchfork included the album as No. 170 in their 200 best albums of the 1980s, commenting that the album "illustrates his seismic impact".

Vibe stated the album was "an entrancing and not all together lascivious collection that sways just as often as it shimmies."

== Track listing ==
=== Mister Yellowman ===
All lyrics are written by Winston Foster

No.	Title	Length
1.	"Natty sat upon a Rock"	3:26
2.	"Lost Mi Love"	5:11
3.	"Mr. Chin"	4:02
4.	"Two to Six Supermix"	4:17
5.	"Morning Ride"	3:52
6.	"How You Keep a Dance"	3:17
7.	"Jamaica a Little Miami"	3:04
8.	"Yellowman Getting Married"	3:35
9.	"Duppy or Gunman"	3:57
10.	"Cocky did a Hurt Me"	3:18

=== Duppy or Gunman ===
All lyrics are written by Winston Foster

No.	Title	Length
1.	"Lost Mi Love"	5:14
2.	"Mr. Chin"	4:05
3.	"Two To Six Supermix"	4:21
4.	"Morning Ride"	3:53
5.	"Cocky did a Hurt Me"	3:20
6.	"Natty sat upon a Rock"	3:27
7.	"How You Keep a Dance"	3:19
8.	"Jamaica a Little Miami"	3:07
9.	"Duppy or Gunman"	4:00
10.	"Yellowman Getting Married"	4:15

In the album Duppy or Gunman the song "Yellowman Getting Married" features an extra verse before the end. In the album Mister Yellowman this verse was edited out.
