= Nitty Gritty =

- Born: Glen Augustus Holness; 1957
- Origin: Kingston, Jamaica
- Died: 24 June 1991 (aged 34)
- Genres: Reggae, roots reggae, digital reggae, dubplate, dancehall
- Instrument: Vocals
- Years active: Early 1970s–1991

Glen Augustus Holness (1957 – 24 June 1991), otherwise known by his stage name Nitty Gritty, was a popular Jamaican reggae singer. Born in the August Town section of Kingston, Jamaica, he was the second of eleven children born to religious parents.

== Biography ==
Holness formed The Soulites in the early 1970s and recorded his first solo single in the early 1980s for producer Sugar Minott. He worked on the Zodiac sound system and recorded further singles, working with George Phang before moving on to King Jammy in 1985, with whom he had his breakthrough success with "Hog inna Minty", a composition based on Jamaican folk music song. Nitty Gritty was the first to record the song and was an instant success. He enjoyed further successful singles produced by Jammy, and his debut album, Turbo Charged was released in 1986, as was the split album with King Kong, Musical Confrontation. He moved to live in London before relocating to New York City, where he continued to record but less frequently. Further albums followed with General Penitentiary (1987), Nitty Gritty (1988), and Jah in the Family (1989).

On 24 June 1991, he was shot dead in front of Super Power Record Shop in Brooklyn, New York, at the age of 34, for which deejay Super Cat was initially suspected yet later cleared.

== Discography ==
- Turbo Charged (1986), Greensleeves
- Musical Confrontation (1986), Jammy's – with King Kong
- General Penitentiary (1987), Black Victory
- Nitty Gritty (1988), Witty's
- Jah in the Family (1989), Blacka Dread
- Powerhouse Presents (1989), with Tenor Saw

Compilations

- Tribute to Nitty Gritty: Trials & Crosses (1994), VP
- We Run Things (2002), Rhino – with Tenor Saw
