= The Grace Thrillers =

Jamaican gospel group

- Origin: Jamaica
- Genres: Gospel
- Years active: 1971–present

The Grace Thrillers is a Jamaican gospel group. The group was founded in 1971 by Noel Willis. Although the members have changed over the years, the group remains one of the most internationally recognized Jamaican gospel groups and has performed in many countries including the United States, United Kingdom, and Canada.

Current membership includes founder Noel Willis Jr. Alrick O' Connor, Mary Lewis, Shalli Burchell, Natalie Foster, Cadian Brown, Althea Hemmings and Larry Snow. They have performed with some of the biggest gospel acts, including the Hawkins Family, the Commissions, the Richard Smallwood Singers, Candi Staton, Shirley Caesar, Jesse Dixon and The Williams Brothers.

== History ==
In 1984, the group represented the Caribbean in the World Gospel Festival in Chicago. In 1986 they were awarded the Rainbow Production Awards for most consistent gospel group and best gospel album, as well as the Tibby's Auto Supplies Award for Spiritual Ministry through Music and Song. In 1987 they won the Rockers Award for Best Gospel Album.

They won the Jamaica Music Industry Award (JAMIA) for Best Performing Gospel Group in 1988, and again in 1992, as well as a Gospel Celebrations Award, in 1991, awarded for their contribution and pioneering role in gospel music. In 1991 groups from across Jamaica paid tribute to The Grace Thrillers at the Ranny Williams Entertainment Centre in Kingston. That same year the Mayor of Opa-Locka, Florida proclaimed July 1 as "Grace Thrillers Day".

== Discography ==
=== Charted singles ===
List of charted singles, showing year released, chart positions and album name
Title	Year	Peak chart position	Album
Title	Year	JAM Air.	Album
"Can't Even Walk"	1994	5	Can't Even Walk (Without You Holding My Hand)
