= Windsong International Records =

Independent record label

Windsong International Records was an independent record label in the United Kingdom active in the early 1990s. It specialised in releasing recordings made for or by BBC Radio One for broadcast on the In Concert radio programme.

BBC Radio 1 Live in Concert is a series of albums licensed to Windsong International.

== BBC Radio 1 Live in Concert series ==
- WINCD001 – Family
- WINCD002 – The Sensational Alex Harvey Band
- WINCD003 – Caravan
- WINCD004 – Wishbone Ash – Paris Theatre, 25 May 1972
- WINCD005 – Nazareth
- WINCD006 – Echo & the Bunnymen – Empire Theatre, Liverpool 11 January 1988
- WINCD007 – Hawkwind – Paris Theatre, 28 September 1972
- WINCD008 – The Skids
- WINCD009 – The Ruts, Penetration – Paris Theatre, 7 July 1979
- WINCD010 – Q-Tips
- WINCD011 – New Order
- WINCD012 – John Martyn
- WINCD013 – Robin Trower
- WINCD014 – Steve Hillage
- WINCD015 – Racing Cars
- WINCD016 – UFO
- WINCD017 – Pat Travers
- WINCD018 – Kevin Ayers
- WINCD019 – Stackridge
- WINCD020 – Steve Earle – 29 November 1988
- WINCD021 – John Miles
- WINCD022 – The Screaming Blue Messiahs
- WINCD023 – Fields of the Nephilim
- WINCD024 – Thin Lizzy – Reading Festival, 28 August 1983
- WINCD025 – Paice Ashton Lord
- WINCD026 – XTC – 22 December 1980
- WINCD027 – Amon Düül 2 – 1973
- WINCD028 – Ultravox
- WINCD029 – The Incredible String Band
- WINCD030 – The Selecter / The Specials – Paris Theatre, 5 December 1979
- WINCD031 – Soft Machine – 1971
- WINCD032 – Tyrannosaurus Rex – 1970
- WINCD033 – Ashton-Lord
- WINCD034 – Richard Thompson
- WINCD035 – The Mission – No Snow, No Show (For The Eskimo)
- WINCD036 – Vibrators / The Boys
- WINCD037 – Stiff Little Fingers – Paris Theatre, 8 April 1981
- WINCD038 – The Fall – Rock City, Nottingham, 25 May 1987
- WINCD039 – Bert Jansch
- WINCD040 – Magazine
- WINCD041 – The Albion Country Band
- WINCD042 – Atomic Rooster
- WINCD043 – Michael Schenker Group
- WINCD044 – All About Eve
- WINCD045 – Deke Leonard's Iceberg / Man
- WINCD046 – Clint Eastwood & General Saint
- WINCD047 – Dexys Midnight Runners – 6 June 1982
- WINCD048 – Lone Justice – Town & Country Club, 11 June 1986
- WINCD049 – Sham 69
- WINCD050 – Rick Wakeman
- WINCD051 – New Model Army
- WINCD052 – Curtis Mayfield – Town & Country Club, 1990
- WINCD053 – Icicle Works
- WINCD054 – Frankie Miller
- WINCD055 – Spear of Destiny
- WINCD056 – Soft Machine – 1972
- WINCD057 – Ruby Turner – Glastonbury Festival, 1986
- WINCD058 – The Long Ryders – Mayfair Club, Newcastle, 3 June 1987; Chester Rendezvous Club, Chester, 15 October 1985
- WINCD059 – Lone Star
- WINCD060 – The Bothy Band
- WINCD061 – Streetwalkers
- WINCD062 – Eddie and the Hot Rods
- WINCD063 – Matching Mole
- WINCD064 – The Groundhogs
- WINCD065 – Be-Bop Deluxe
- WINCD066 – Gentle Giant
- WINCD067 – Argent
- WINCD068 – Killing Joke – Paris Theatre, 6 March 1985 & Reading Festival, 22 August 1986
- WINCD069 – Strawbs
- WINCD070 – Jethro Tull
- WINCD071 – Gay and Terry Woods
- WINCD072 – Dire Straits
- WINCD073 – Steve Harley
- WINCD074 – The Wonder Stuff
- WINCD075 – Big Country
- WINCD076 – Jack Bruce
- WINCD077 – Judie Tzuke
- WINCD078 – Hunter Ronson Band
- WINCD079 – Colin Blunstone
- WINCD080 – The Only Ones
- WINCD081 – Chris Farlowe
- WINCD082 – The Blues Band
- WINCD083 – Graham Parker
- WINCD084 – Mott the Hoople
