= Red Rose for Gregory =

Studio album by Gregory Isaacs
- Released: August 1, 1988
- Recorded: Music Works Studio, Kingston
- Studio: Music Works Recording Studio, Kingston, Jamaica
- Genre: Reggae
- Length: 52:28
- Label: RAS Records, Greensleeves
- Producer: Augustus "Gussie" Clarke

Gregory Isaacs chronology
Come Along (1988)	Red Rose for Gregory (1988)	Nickles and Dimes (1988)

Red Rose for Gregory is an 11-track album by reggae artist, Gregory Isaacs released in 1988 by RAS Records. The album combines the style and sound of lovers rock with roots reggae and it features the hit, "Rumours".

== Track listing ==
1. "Red Rose for Gregory" (Hopeton Lindo) - 4:09
2. "Teacher's Plight" (12" Promo Mix) - 6:05
3. "Break the Date" - 3:31
4. "Rumours" (12" Hit Mix) (Carlton Hines) - 6:12
5. "Slow Down" (Hopeton Lindo) - 4:19
6. "All I Need Is You" - 3:58
7. "Rough Neck" (Featuring The Mighty Diamonds)(12" Street Mix)- 6:53
8. "Intimate Potential" (Allan Clarke, Lloyd Ferguson) - 4:19
9. "Me No In A Dat" - 3:45
10. "Closer Than a Brother" - 3:58
11. "Mind Yu Dis" (12" Manners Mix) (Hopeton Lindo) - 5:22

== Personnel ==
- Gregory Isaacs - vocals
- The Mighty Diamonds - harmony vocals on "Rough Neck"
- Cleveland "Clevie" Browne - drums
- Dalton Brownie - guitar
- Dean Fraser - saxophone
- Wycliffe "Steely" Johnson - bass, piano
- J.C. Lodge - harmony vocals
- Mikey Bennett - backing vocals
- Robert Lyn - synthesizer, piano, synth horns, programming
- Dwight Pinkney - guitar
- Danny Browne - bass

Technical

- Courtney Small - assistant producer, engineer
- Steven Stanley - mixing, engineer
