= Nobody Move (album) =

Studio album by Yellowman
- Released: 1983
- Recorded: 1983
- Studio: Channel One Studios/Harry J's Studio
- Genre: Dancehall
- Label: Volcano
- Producer: Henry "Junjo" Lawes

Alternative cover
- 1984 Greensleeves release

Nobody Move is an album by Jamaican dancehall deejay Yellowman, released by Volcano Records in 1983. It was released in a slightly altered form outside Jamaica in 1984 as Nobody Move Nobody Get Hurt.

== Background, recording, and releases ==
Produced by Henry "Junjo" Lawes, the album features rhythms recorded by the Roots Radics at Channel One Studios. The album was then voiced and mixed by Sylvan Morris at Harry J's studio. The 1983 Volcano release included the hit single "Nobody Move", and a sleeve featuring a Wilfred Limonius painting on the rear side. The album was picked up by Greensleeves Records, who altered the running order and replaced "Yellowman Have Some Skill" with "Body Move" (released in Jamaica as a single) and "Wreck a Pum Pum", which was released as a single by Greensleeves.

The 1984 version of the album was also released in France on the Carrere and Blue Moon labels, and in the US as a Greensleeves/Shanachie Records co-release. "Nobody Move" gave Yellowman his breakthrough in the US market.

The album was first released on CD in 1988 by Greensleeves with the same tracklisting as the 1984 release. Greensleeves reissued it in 2004 as part of its 'Reggae Classics' series, with the 12-inch mix of "Rub & Go Down" added as a bonus track.

"Nobody Move" was sampled by Eazy-E on his 1988 track of the same name.

== Reception ==
Professional ratings
Review scores
Source	Rating
AllMusic	5/5 stars
The Encyclopedia of Popular Music	2/5 stars

Reviewing the 1984 release, Jo-Ann Greene for Allmusic awarded it five stars, calling it "A phenomenal set from a world-class DJ at the top of his game, a band at its best, and a producer who was absolutely unbeatable." The BBC, reviewing the 2004 issue, called the album "one that could rock the dance twenty years ago and still can now".

== Track listing ==
=== Nobody Move ===
1. "Nobody Move"
2. "Hill & Gully Rider"
3. "Yellowman a the Lover Boy"
4. "Why You Bad So"
5. "Bedroom Mazurka"
6. "Strictly Mi Belly"
7. "Good Loving"
8. "Yellowman Have Some Skill"
9. "Watch Your Words"

=== Nobody Move Nobody Get Hurt ===
1. "Nobody Move"
2. "Strictly Mi Belly"
3. "Bedroom Mazurka"
4. "Body Move"
5. "Good Loving"
6. "Wreck a Pum Pum"
7. "Hill & Gully Rider"
8. "Yellowman a the Lover Boy"
9. "Watch Your Words"
10. "Why You Bad So"

2004 bonus track:

1. "Rub & Go Down" (12" mix)
