= Fletchers Land =

- Community
- Location within Jamaica
- Coordinates: 17°58′40.16″N 76°47′20.03″W
- Country: Jamaica
- City: Kingston
- Time zone: UTC-5 (EST)

Fletchers Land, sometimes written as Fletcher's Land, is a neighborhood in downtown Kingston, Jamaica. The area, served by the Central Kingston Police Division, has a reputation for being dangerous. The no longer active Land Raiders Gang emerged in Fletchers Land.

== Notable people ==
- Reggae artist Linval "Ashaka" Thomas is from Fletchers Land.
