= Burro Banton =

Jamaican reggae deejay (born 1956)

- Born: Donovan Spalding; 27 December 1956 (age 69); Kingston, Jamaica
- Genres: Reggae
- Instruments: Vocalist, Songwriter
- Years active: 1976–present

Burro Banton (born Donovan Spalding; 27 December 1956 in Kingston, Jamaica) is a dancehall/reggae deejay popular in the mid-1980s and 1990s.

He is most famous for his anthem "Boom Wah Dis", which was recorded on the Steely & Clevie riddim called "Street Sweeper".

Burro emerged during the mid-1980s at the beginning of the digital dancehall craze started by King Jammy that also featured artists like Cutty Ranks. He is known for his very aggressive style; deep, gruff voice; and was the inspiration for many modern dancehall artists like Buju Banton, Bounty Killer, and Elephant Man.

== Biography ==
Banton's career began in 1976 when he entered a talent contest at the Skateland discothèque in Kingston. His early influences included Ranking Joe, Dillinger, Trinity, U Brown, and Ranking Trevor. It was around 1978 he first worked with the sound system called Black Hoover, later moving to the Roots Unlimited sound system where he worked alongside Josey Wales. He finally established his public reputation and career in 1982 as a DJ for the Gemini sound system and continued in their employment for a further two years. Through the middle and late-1980s, his skills as a DJ enabled him to work for Volcano, Stero Mars and the Kilimanjaro sound system, where he was featured with Super Cat and Nicodemus.

Banton's first recording was with the legendary producer Henry "Junjo" Lawes, owner of the Volcano sound-system. Banton released his first LP, Buro, in 1983. In 1984 he toured Canada with John Wayne and began to nurture the career of his protégé, Little Burro.

His single Praise Up Jah Jah released in 1987 was greatly in demand amongst the conscious roots reggae sound system fraternity in England, thanks to Jah Shaka regularly playing the tune on dubplate at his dances. As the 1990s approached, Burro Banton continued working with Super Cat and Nicodemus. Super Cat formed the "Wild Apache" label, where Burro recorded his first recording of a #1 hit, "Boom Wah Dis." When Super Cat signed with Columbia/SME Records, Burro Banton joined forces with the ace producer Bobby Konders and the Massive B label in 1991. Here, Burro Banton recorded numerous #1 hits including "Washington Session", "Tek a Set", "Westmoreland Sensi", and many more.

Massive B released Burro's second LP, The Original Banton in 1995. Burro continued recording with Massive B until 1998 and during this period worked with Steely and Clevie, one of Jamaica's most respected production teams, for whom he reworked his earlier hit "Boom Wah Dis" on their "Street Sweeper" riddim, scoring another #1 hit from Kingston, Jamaica, to New York to Miami and beyond. It was in heavy rotation around the world for many months in reggae and Caribbean-music circles.

=== 2000 and Beyond ===
Extending his recording career with Massive B in 2000, his releases titled "Politicians" on the "Lickshot Rewind" riddim delves into hard time in the ghetto of Kingston and wishes the politicians would keep their promises of a better life. In addition, he released "Phenomenon 2" on the Dun Dem riddim, in which he praises the role played by people involved in the ganja trade. His latest efforts on Massive B's Rock, Penicillin, and Tempo riddims features a #1 European single called "Jah Jah Rules".

Burro Banton has been touring constantly over the last ten years across Asia, Europe, and throughout North America. He has shared the stage with Capleton and Bounty Killer.

Burro Banton continues to record commercially successful and critically acclaimed music, including his hit song Badder Den Dem, which is featured on the dedicated Massive B radio station in the videogame Grand Theft Auto IV.
