= Yellowman =

Jamaican reggae singer

Yellowman OD
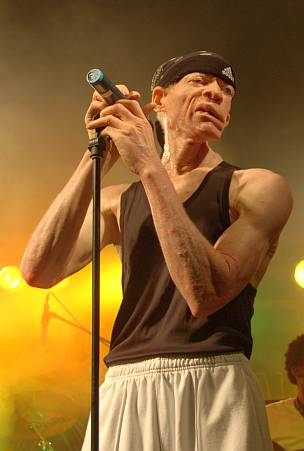
- Yellowman performing in 2007

Background information
- Also known as: King Yellowman
- Born: Winston Foster; Kingston, Jamaica
- Genres: Reggae; dancehall
- Occupations: Musician; songwriter; deejay
- Years active: 1974–present
- Labels: Columbia/CBS; Greensleeves; Artist Only; VP; RAS/Sanctuary
- Website: Official website

Winston Foster OD, (born 15 January 1956) better known by the stage name Yellowman and also known as King Yellowman, is a Jamaican reggae and dancehall deejay. He first became popular in Jamaica in the 1980s, rising to prominence with a series of singles that established his reputation.

Yellowman is considered to be one of the genre's pioneers and has been credited with "almost single-handedly [creating] the coarse, crude and fearlessly direct sound of today's dancehall." Spearheading the first generation of dancehall deejays, he brought the genre to an international audience.

== Career ==
Winston Foster was abandoned by his parents and grew up in the Maxfield Children's Home and the Catholic orphanage Alpha Boys School in Kingston, the latter known for its musical alumni. He was shunned due to having albinism, which was not typically socially accepted in Jamaica.

Yellowman attributes his early success to the encouragement of well-known PNP-affiliated gangster General Starky aka Anthony Tingle. He recalls that it was Starky who ensured that he got his chance on the ‘mike’, so that he could show his skills, giving him the space to develop into the superstar he became.

In the late 1970s Yellowman first gained wide attention when he finished second to Nadine Sutherland in the 1978 Tastee Talent Contest, a competition he would go on to win in the following year's edition, launching his professional career. Like many Jamaican deejays, he honed his talents by frequently performing at outdoor sound-system dances, prominently with Aces International. He had success as a recording artist, working with producer Henry "Junjo" Lawes during the early 1980s. In 1981, after becoming popular throughout Jamaica, Yellowman became the first dancehall artist to be signed to a major American label (Columbia Records).

His first studio album release was in 1982 entitled Mister Yellowman followed by Zungguzungguguzungguzeng in 1983 earning instant success. Yellowman's sexually explicit lyrics in popular songs such as "Mad Over Me", boasting, like other reggae singers/deejays, of his sexual prowess, earned Yellowman criticism in the mid-1980s. In response he has proclaimed: "I never know why they call it slackness. I talk about sex, but it's just what happens behind closed doors. What I talk is reality."

During his time at Aces, Yellowman would often perform at live shows with Vernon "Fathead" Rainford, whom which he would collaborate in some studio releases over the following years. Overall, the 1980s were Yellowman's most productive decade, going on to release around twenty albums under different labels, such as Mister Yellowman, Duppy or Gunman, Bad Boy Skanking, Zungguzungguguzungguzeng, among others.

Yellowman appeared in Jamaican Dancehall Volcano Hi-power 1983 which featured other major dancehall musicians such as Massive Dread, Josey Wales, Burro Banton and Eek-A-Mouse. His 1984 release and debut under the Columbia label proper, King Yellowman, was met with negative reception and proved a commercial failure. Yellowman was persuaded to incorporate elements from rhythm and blues and disco which did not please international dancehall fans. Ultimately, CBS dropped Yellowman, who returned to his classic riddims and slackness, and his career quickly recovered.

He had success in 1987 with a version of "Blueberry Hill", that topped the charts for several weeks in Jamaica. Yellowman had met Fats Domino when the American performed on the island earlier in the decade, and Domino had presented him with a copy of his version.

By the mid-1990s, Yellowman released socially conscious material, rising to international fame along with singers such as Buju Banton. Yellowman became the island's most popular deejay. During the early 1980s, Yellowman had over 40 singles and produced up to five albums per year.

Foster re-invented himself with his 1994 album Prayer, which stepped away from the slackness that gave him his initial fame in favour of a more religious theme as a way to thank God for his success in music as well as in surviving cancer. His latest albums are New York (2003), Round 1 (2005), and No More War (2019). Yellowman was also a featured guest vocalist on the Run-DMC track "Roots Rap Reggae". Yellowman continues to perform internationally with his Sagittarius Band, and has toured through places such as Nigeria where he retains a following of fans, as well as Spain, Peru, Sweden, Italy, Germany, Britain, France, Kenya, the United States and Canada. He also featured on OPM's 2004 album, Forthemasses.

Yellowman was nominated for the Grammy Award for Best Reggae Album in two occasions; in 1985 for King Yellowman, and in 1998 for Freedom of Speech. He was the first dancehall artist to be nominated for this category.

In 2018, it was announced that he would be awarded the Order of Distinction (Officer Class) by the Jamaican government.

== Personal life ==
Yellowman and his wife Rosie have been together since the beginning of his musical career. Together, they have raised multiple children.

Yellowman is a fan of the NBA and attended some games in the mid-1980s. He named one of his sons after Kareem Abdul-Jabbar.

Foster's daughter Kareema followed him into a career in music, and has collaborated with her father in live shows and studio productions.

=== Philosophy ===
He has spoken against violence. In the Montreal Mirror in 2005 he said, "Now it's not your entertainment or teaching. If you notice the hip hop and dancehall artists today, all they do they sing about drugs, clothes, car, house—when they can't get it, they start get violent. I know what violence is like and what it contain and what it can do. I'm glad that the roots is coming back." The slackness style with which Yellowman is associated sometimes has homophobic lyrics. However, in the same Montreal Mirror article he spoke against it: "Everybody listen to me... I don't do songs against gay people, I don't do violent lyric against gay people. If you don't like a person or you don't like a thing, you don't talk about it. You don't come on stage and say kill them or burn them because everybody have a right to live."

=== Cancer ===
In 1982, Yellowman was diagnosed with skin cancer. After several surgeries, Yellowman was able to continue his career. The cancer went into apparent remission during this time. Between late 1984 and 1986 it was diagnosed that the cancer had spread to his jaw; Yellowman underwent invasive jaw surgery to remove a malignant tumor. This surgery permanently disfigured Yellowman's face, as a large portion of the left side of his lower jaw had to be removed to successfully remove the tumor. He spent some time in convalescence before returning to music and performing live shows again in 1987.

== "Zungguzungguguzungguzeng" ==
The instrumental for Yellowman's 1982 "Zungguzungguguzungguzeng", the "Diseases" riddim by "Junjo" Lawes, has been sampled and imitated repeatedly since its original release. The original version of this riddim was performed by Alton Ellis for a song called "Mad, Mad, Mad" produced by Coxsone Dodd in 1967. Coxsone Dodd had already released two dub cuts, "Talking Dub" and "Lusaka", plus a 1980 cut by Jennifer Lara, "Hurt So Good". This riddim came to be known as the 'Diseases' riddim after Michigan and Smiley recorded their song, "Diseases", with Lawes in 1981.

"Zungguzungguguzungguzeng" was remade by Beenie Man and released on 3 July 2020. Yellowman said of the release, "I wish somebody else did do Zungguzungguguzungguzeng, maybe Shaggy or Sean Paul... Me nuh even hear it."

The vocal melody of "Zungguzungguguzungguzeng" has also been sampled heavily in various reggae and hip hop songs.

Timeline:

- Bonehead, "Zungguzungguguzungguzeng" (see also, Live at Aces version, w/ Fathead) (1982)
- Sister Nancy, "Coward of the Country" (1982)
- Frankie Paul, "Alesha" (1984)
- Toyan, "Hot Bubble Gum" (1984)
- Cocoa Tea, "I Lost My Sonia" (1985)
- Super Cat, "Boops" (1985)
- BDP, "Remix For P Is Free" (1987)
- BDP, "Tcha Tcha" (1988)
- Nice & Smooth, "Nice & Smooth" (1989)
- Nice & Smooth, "Dope on a Rope" (1989)
- K7, "Zunga Zeng" (1993)
- KRS-One, "P Is Still Free" (1993)
- Us3, "I Got It Goin' On" (1993)
- Buju Banton, "Big It Up" (1993)
- Ninjaman, "Funeral Again" (1994)
- Bounty Killer, "Kill Or Be Killed" (1994)
- Sublime, "Greatest Hits" (1994)
- Just My Imagination w/Sista Sensi (2013)
- Frosty the Dopeman w/Sista Sensi
- Buju Banton, "Man a Look Yu" (1995)
- Junior M.A.F.I.A. (feat. The Notorious B.I.G.), "Player's Anthem" (1995)
- Sublime, "Roots of Creation" (1995)
- 2Pac, "Hit 'Em Up" (1996)
- Black Star, "Definition" (1998)
- Mr. Notty, "Sentencia de Muerte" (1998)
- Dead Prez, "It's Bigger than Hip-Hop" (2000)
- Beenie Man, featuring Wyclef Jean, "Love Me Now" (2000)
- Nejo, track 14 (DJ Joe's Fatal Fantasy 1)(2001)
- Joe Budden, "Pump It Up" (2003)
- Tego Calderón, "Bonsai" (2003)
- Jin, "Learn Chinese" (2004)
- Vybz Kartel, "Tight Pussy Gyal" (2004)
- Josey Wales, "Leggo Mi Hand" (2005)
- P.O.D., featuring Matisyahu, "Roots in Stereo" (2006)
- White Rappers, "One Night Stand" (2007)
- Kraff, featuring Jiggy D “Narly” (2024)

== Discography ==
=== Studio albums ===
Album year	Album title
1982	Mister Yellowman / Duppy Or Gunman
1982	King Mellow Yellow Meets Yellowman
1982	Superstar Yellowman Has Arrived With Toyan
1982	Jack Sprat / Life In The Ghetto
1982	Just Cool
1982	Them A Mad Over Me
1982	Bad Boy Skanking
1983	Divorced! (For Your Eyes Only)
1982	One Yellowman And Fathead
1982	The Yellow, The Purple & The Nancy
1982	Yellow Man, Fat Head And The One Peter Metro
1983	Zungguzungguguzungguzeng
1983	Nobody Move (1983) / Nobody Move Nobody Get Hurt (1984)
1984	King Yellowman
1984	Operation Radication / One In A Million
1984	Showdown Vol. 5
1984	Two Giants Clash
1985	Galong, Galong, Galong
1985	Walking Jewellery Store
1986	Girls Them Pet / Rambo
1985	Yellow Man Meets Charlie Chaplin
1986	Going To The Chapel
1987	Yellow Like Cheese
1987	Blueberry Hill
1988	Yellowman Rides Again
1988	Yellowman Sings The Blues
1988	King Of The Dancehall
1988	Don't Burn It Down
1989	Strikes Again
1990	A Feast Of Yellow Dub
1991	Mi Hot
1991	Party
1992	Reggae On The Move
1993	In Bed With Yellowman / Mellow Yellow
1993	A Man You Want
1993	Reggae On Top
1994	Prayer
1995	Good Sex Guide
1995	Kiss Me
1995	Message To The World
1997	Freedom of Speech
1998	A Very, Very Yellow Christmas
1999	Yellow Fever
2003	New York
2019	No More War

=== Live albums ===
Album year	Album title
1982	Live At Reggae Sunsplash
1982	Live At Aces
1983	Live At Killamanjaro
1983	Live in London (1983) / Live In England (1992)
1983	Live Stage Show At Ranny Williams Entertainment Center
1987	The Negril Chill Challenge
1994	Best Of Live In Paris
1994	Live In Paris
1998	Live At Maritime Hall

=== Compilations ===
Year	Title
1987	A Reggae Calypso Encounter
1991	20 Super Hits
1993	Fantastic Yellowman
1996	Best Of Yellowman
1996	Yellowman Meets The Paragons
1997	RAS Portraits
2001	Look How Me Sexy
2004	Just Cool (Compilation)
2004	Yellow Fever (Compilation)
2006	Reggae Chronicles
2007	Most Wanted
2013	Reggae Anthology: Young, Gifted & Yellow (1981-1985)

=== Videos ===
Year	Title
1998	Yellowman Peace Tour (VHS)
1998	Live In San Francisco (DVD)
2004	Kingston Signals, Vol. 1: 3 The Hard Way (DVD)
2007	Stars in Action, Part 2 (DVD)
2007	Yellowman / Chaka Demus & Pliers: Living Legends In Concert (DVD)
