= Slackness (Jamaican music) =

Vulgarity in West Indian culture, behavior and the music

Slackness refers to vulgarity in West Indian culture, behavior, and music. It also refers to a subgenre of dancehall music with straightforward sexual lyrics performed live or recorded. Its form and pronunciation varies throughout the Caribbean.

With the decline of roots reggae music, sound systems regained popularity. DJs performed over extended grooves produced by a new mixing style of selecting called "juggling." The energy in the dance halls became very sexual, with increasingly revealing clothing, scandalous dance styles, and cruder lyrics from the DJs. Previously, sexual lyrics had been merely suggestive, but the new "slack" lyrics, part of the rebellion against fading Rastafari movement ideals, left nothing to the imagination. The term reflects the derisive attitude typified by the Nyabinghi toward reggae music seen as lacking a deeper message.

The rise of dancehall music coincided with important shifts in Jamaican society. Politically, the Jamaican people had rejected the originally revolutionary democratic socialist regime of Michael Manley and the People's National Party, placing their hopes instead on Edward Seaga and the Jamaica Labour Party. Since Bob Marley's death there has been little mainstream media representation of disadvantaged Jamaicans and Rastafari in popular culture. Political and cultural changes along with shifting public tastes led to a new dancehall culture that became an increasingly important institution for West Indians, Jamaicans in particular.

Yellowman proclaimed, "I never know why they call it slackness. I talk about sex, but it's just what happens behind closed doors. What I talk is reality".

== Bibliography ==
- Stolzoff, Norman C. (2000). Wake the Town & Tell the People. Duke University Press. ISBN 0-8223-2514-4.
- Cooper, Carolyn (1995). Noises in the Blood. Duke University Press. ISBN 0-8223-1595-5.
