= Patrick Andy =

- Born: c. 1960; Clarendon Parish, Jamaica
- Origin: Clarendon Parish, Jamaica
- Died: April 28, 2022
- Genres: Reggae
- Instrument: vocals

Patrick Andy (born c. 1960, Clarendon Parish, Jamaica) was a reggae singer, whose stage name is a reference to his similarity to the older reggae singer Horace Andy.

== Biography ==
Patrick Andy began singing at church and in school, and began his recording career working with spiritually conscious Roots Reggae vocalist, engineer and producer Yabby You in the mid-1970s, often covering socially aware songs by Horace Andy, such as "Every Tongue Shall Tell" and "Youths of Today", which Yabby You released on his own label as King Tubby's vocal and dub 45s, giving the artist his distinctive, respected and authoritative imprimatur.

In 1978 he had a hit on the UK based Grove label, run by King Sounds and Michael Reuben Campbell with "Woman, Woman, Woman", in combination with Ranking Barnabas, and a solo hit with "My Angel". In the early 1980s he began recording with producer Joseph Hoo Kim at Channel One Studios, and further hits followed with "Tired Fe Lick Weed Inna Bush" and "Pretty Me".

By the mid 1980s the musical style and fashion was gradually moving from the Roots Radics Scientist (musician) engineered slower, spacious dancehall style towards digital reggae sounds, but Patrick Andy still continued to enjoy further hits in a dancehall style, with "Get Up Stand Up" (1984, based on Half Pint's hit "Greeting" ) , "Smiling", and "Sting Me a Sting, Shock Me a Shock", recorded for Prince Jammy in 1985, the latter based on the digital Sleng Teng rhythm, but played on real instruments. More hits followed and Andy recorded a number of "clash" albums, where tracks were split between Andy and a series of "opponents", including Sleng Teng star Wayne Smith, Frankie Jones, Half Pint, and Horace Andy.

== Discography ==
- Showdown vol. 7 (1984) Channel One/Hitbound (with Wayne Smith)
- Two New Superstars (1985) Burning Sounds (with Frankie Jones)
- Clash of the Andys (1985) Thunder Bolt (with Horace Andy)
