= List of Casio keyboards =

Casio electronic musical keyboards were first manufactured in June 1979 and continue to be made by Casio today. Older units in the Casio line, despite being limited, were and still are popular with independent artists like Jack Stauber and Outkast for their unique sounds, particularly their pulse-code modulation keyboards. The original Casiotone line was abbreviated to CT in the mid-1980s but has continued to feature full-sized keys. MT and PT lines typically feature mini keys and the VL line features push-button keys. Most Casio keyboards feature automated accompaniment sections which may include drums, bass, chords and harmonies. Many Casio keyboards can be run on both mains electricity and battery power. Some Casio keyboards were integrated into other electronic audio equipment, including AM/FM radios and cassette decks. Casio keyboards from the 1980s and 1990s are occasionally used by ambitious sound designers who use circuit bending, a process in which a person rewires the circuitry in innovative ways in an attempt to increase functionality, to extend the keyboard's sound palettes. The following list includes some of the instruments' basic specifications and is not exhaustive.

== Casiotone keyboards (1980–present) ==
Series	Model	Year	Keys	Key size	Preset Tones	Polyphony (notes)	Batteries	MIDI	Notes	References
Casiotone	101	1981	49	full	25	8		-	Voices only (no rhythm section). Sustain and vibrato effects only. Four tones of choice can be stored for press-button access.	
Casiotone	201	1980	49	full	29	8		-	Vibrato, sustain effects and tape echo to/from input/output.	
Casiotone	202	1981	49	full	49	8		-	Vibrato and sustain effects.	
Casiotone	301	1980	49	full	14	8		-	Vibrato effects.	
Casiotone	401	1981	49	full	14	8		-	Vibrato, sustain and hold effects.	
Casiotone	403	1982	49	full	25	8		-	Sustain and vibrato. Mandolin and Music Box sounds repeat at a fixed interval. Four tones of choice can be stored for press-button access. 'Frog' preset	
Casiotone	405	1983	49	full	20	8		-	Vibrato, sustain and reverb. Modulation effects.	
Casiotone	501	1983	49	full		8	AA (x3)*	-	Sustain and vibrato. *Batteries only protect memory.	
Casiotone	601	1981	61	full	20	8		-	Sustain and vibrato. 2 additional sound effects triggers.	
Casiotone	610	1981	61	full	20	8		-	Stereo chorus and sustain effects.	
Casiotone	701	1981	61	full	20	8		-	Sustain and vibrato (with options, including vibrato delay). 2 additional sound effects (one is a laser). Had barcode reader accessory to program the on-board sequencer.	
Casiotone	1000p	1982	61	full	10	8		-	Vibrato, delayed vibrato, heavy vibrato, sustain. Interesting arpeggiator. 10 presets, 10 user programmable patches.	
Casiotone	7000	1983	61	full	20	8	AA (x3)*	-	Vibrato and sustain effects. Sequencer with 1855 note memory. *Batteries only protect memory.	
CT	102	1984	49	full	6	8	D (x6)		Sustain effect only.	
CT	310	1984	49	full	12	8	D (x6)		Vibrato, sustain and reverb effects.	
CT	320	1985	49	full	12					
CT	350	1986	49	full	12	8	D (x6)	-	Sustain effect only.	
CT	360	1987	49	full	12	8	D (x6)	-	"Songbank" keyboard. No effects or pedal inputs. Also released as Radio Shack Concertmate 660.	
CT	370	1988	49	full	210	10	D (x6)			
CT	380	1988	49	full	210	10	D (x6)	in/out	Also released as the PMP-300 as part of Casio's "Professional" line.	
CT	390	1989	49	full	210	10	D (x6)			
CT	395	1989	49	full	110	12	AA (x6)			
CT	400		49	full	100	16	AA (x6)		Has 5 sound effect pads.	
CT	410V	1984	49	full	20	8	D (x6)		Has analog filter with cutoff, envelope and resonance controls. Input for BFC-1 Breath Filter Controller which allows control the filters with breath.	
CT	420	1990	49	full	210	10	D (x6)			
CT	430	1986	49	full	20	8	D (x6)			
CT	450		49	full	12	8	D (x6)			
CT	460	1988	49	full	465	10	D (x6)	MIDI	Has PCM "Sound Effect" section. Has MIDI in/out only (no thru). Similar to MT-540.	
CT	470	1989	49	full	220	12	D (x6)	MIDI	Has "Tone Editor" with detune, delay, attack/decay and release and "Multi-Accompaniment System"	
CT	510	1987	49	full	12	8	D (x6)			
CT	599	2007	61	full						
CT	605	1985	61	full	20	8	D (x6)			
CT	607	1987	61	full	20	10	D (x6)			
CT	615	1990	61	full	210		D (x6)			
CT	620	1985	61	full	20	8	D (x6)			
CT	625	1989	61	full	210	10	D (x6)			
CT	630	1987	61	full	30	8	D (x6)	in/out/thru	Preset-only home version of Casio's Spectrum Dynamic (SD) synthesizers.	
CT	636	1990	61	full	465	10	D (x6)		"Auto harmonise" effect.	
CT	638	1990	61	full	465					
CT	640	1988	61	full	465	10	D (x6)	in/out/thru	Tonebank allows layering of two sounds with reduced polyphony. Can "register" 4 patches for quick access, similar to the earlier Casiotone 101.	
CT	647	1992	61	full	120	16	D (x6)		Two reverb effects and stereo panning. Forty-song "jukebox".	
CT	648	1992	61	full						
CT	650	1989	61	full	465	10	D (x6)	in/out/thru	Tonebank allows layering of two sounds with reduced polyphony. Can "register" 4 patches for quick access, similar to the earlier Casiotone 101.	
CT	655	1989	61	full	110	12	D (x6)	in/out	Has "Tone Editor" with detune, delay, attack/decay and release. Has sustain pedal input. Not velocity sensitive. Also released as the PMP-600 as part of Casio's "Professional" line.	
CT	657	1989	61	full	110	12	D (x6)	-	Has "Tone Editor" with delay, attack/decay and release.	
CT	660	1988	61	full	465	10	D (x6)	in/out/thru	Has PCM "Sound Effect" section. Can "register" 4 patches for quick access, similar to the earlier Casiotone 101. Also released as the PMP-500 as part of Casio's "Professional" line.	
CT	670	1989	61	full	220	12	D (x6)	in/out/thru	Has "Tone Editor" with detune, delay, attack/decay and release and "Multi-Accompaniment System". Has pitch-bend wheel, MIDI in/out/thru, and tuning fine adjustment. Keyboard is not velocity sensitive. Paula Abdul Demo Song	
CT	680	1990	61	full	220	12	D (x6)	in/out/thru	Has Digital Reverb and "Tone Editor" with detune, delay, attack/decay and release. Also released as the PMP-700 as part of Casio's "Professional" line.	
CT	700	1992	61	full	100	12	D (x6)	in/out	Has sustain jack.	
CT	770	1992	61	full	100	12	D (x6)	in/out	Has Digital Reverb with editable parameters.	
CT	800		32		100				5 SFX pads and plays songs from Casio ROM Packs.	
CT	805	1986	49	full	12	8	D (x6)	-	Sustain effect.	
CT	810	1985	49						Plays songs from Casio ROM Packs.	
CT	840		49	full	100	8	AA (x6)			
CT	870	1995	61	full	100			in/out	Has portamento, pitch bender, three reverb effects, velocity sensitive keyboard.	
CT	888	2002	73	full				MIDI		
CT	6000	1985	61	full	20	8		in/out	8 tone effects, pitch bender wheel with full octave range, velocity sensitive keyboard.	
CT	6500	1986	61	full	48	8		MIDI	3 tone effects, modulation wheel and other features.	
CTK	50	1995	49	full	100	8	AA (x6)			
CTK	80		49							
CTK	100	1994	49	full	100	8	AA (x6)			
CTK	120		49	full	100	8	AA (x6)			
CTK	130		49	full	100	8	AA (x6)			
CTK	150	1993	49	full	100	16	AA (x6)			
CTK	200	1992	49	full	100	16	AA (x6)			
CTK	220L	1996	49	full	100	12	AA (x6)			
CTK	230	2003	49	full	100	12	AA (x6)			
CTK	240		49	full	100	12	AA (x6)			
CTK	300		49	full	100	16	AA (x6)			
CTK	330	1996	49	full	100	12	AA (x6)			
CTK	401	1997	49	full	100	12	AA (x6)			
CTK	411	2006	49	full	100	12	AA (x6)	MIDI		
CTK	431	2007	49	full	100	12	AA (x6)	MIDI		
CTK	450	1988	61	full	64	16	AA (x6)			
CTK	451	2001	61	full	100	12	AA (x6)	MIDI		
CTK	471	2001	61	full	100	12	AA (x6)	MIDI		
CTK	480	2002	61	full	100	12	D (x6)		100 tones, 50 rhythms, 20 songs	
CTK	481	2002-2004	61	full	100	12	AA (x6)		100 tones, 100 rhythms, 100 songs	
CTK	485		61	full	100	12	AA (x6)			
CTK	491	2002	61	full	100	12	AA (x6)	MIDI		
CTK	495	2006	61	full	100	12	AA (x6)			
CTK	496	2004	61	full	100	12	AA (x6)	MIDI		
CTK	500	1992	61	full	120	16	D (x6)			
CTK	501	1998	61	full	100	12	D (x6)	MIDI		
CTK	511	1998	61	full	100	12	D (x6)	MIDI		
CTK	515	1998	61	full	100					
CTK	518	1997	61	full	100		D (x6)	MIDI		
CTK	519	1998	61	full	100					
CTK	520L	1996	61	full	100	12	AA (x6)			
CTK	530	1995	61	full	64	24	D (x6)	MIDI	Similar 550, 650, 750 models.	
CTK	531	1999	61	full	100	16	D (x6)	MIDI		
CTK	533	1999	61	full	100	16	D (x6)	MIDI		
CTK	540	1995	61	full	64	24	D (x6)	MIDI		
CTK	541	1999	61	full	100	16	D (x6)	MIDI	aka OPTIMUS MD-1150	
CTK	550	1999	61	full	100	16	D (x6)	no	Velocity Sensitive, Sustain Pedal Input, Stereo 1.1W x 1.1W Speakers, 40 songs, pred to CTK-650 and CTK-750	
CTK	551	2000	61	full	100	16	D (x6)	MIDI	100 tone, 100 rhythm, 100 song bank, song bank controller, Pitch Bend, 551/558 manual, larger backlit LCD, chord book	
CTK	558	2000	61	full	100	16	D (x6)	MIDI	100 tone, 100 rhythm, 100 song bank, song bank controller, Pitch Bend, 551/558 manual, larger backlit LCD, chord book	
CTK	560L	1998	61	full	100	12	AA (x6)			
CTK	571	2001-2004	61	full	128	24	D (x6)	MIDI	Same as CTK-573 but Black	
CTK	573	2001-2004	61	full	128	24	D (x6)	MIDI	Same as CTK-571 but Silver	
CTK	591	2003	61	full	255	24	D (x6)	MIDI		
CTK	593	2003	61	full	255	24	D (x6)	MIDI		
CTK	601	1997	61	full	168	24	D (x6)	MIDI	200 tone (128 gm, 32 synth, 32 user), 100 rhythm, pad type pitch bend, ctk-601/611/631/concertmate 990, A2 sound	
CTK	611	1997	61	full	168	24	D (x6)	MIDI	Same as 601 but has backlit LCD, A2 sound	
CTK	620L	1997	61	full	137	24	D (x6)	MIDI		
CTK	630		61	full	100	24	D (x6)	MIDI	Has reverb and velocity sensitive keys.	
CTK	631	1999	61	full	200	24	D (x6)	in/out	Reverb (3 types), 100 rhythms, 16 part multitimbral, 5200 notes sequencer., A2 sound, pitch bend wheel	
CTK	650	1994-1995	61	full	128	32	D (x6)	MIDI	Has 10 digital effects. Very good rhythms, magical presets in additional to normal presets, GM support, lofi powerhouse	
CTK	651	2001-2002	61	full	200	24	D (x6)	MIDI	similar to CTK-601/611/631, pitch bend wheel, 32 registrations, 6 drum pads	
CTK	671	2000-2001	61	full	348	32	D (x6)	MIDI	little brother to ctk-691, scaled down ctk-900, zpi processor, better rhythms, 2000 note memory, casio music site downloads via MIDI	
CTK	680		61	full	128	32	D (x6)	MIDI		
CTK	691	2003	61	full	790	32	D (x6)	MIDI	little brother to ctk-900, zpi processor, strong rhythms, groundbreaking in 2003, casio music site downloads via MIDI	
CTK	700	2003	61	full	100	12	AA (x6)	MIDI		
CTK	710		61	full	242	32	AA (x6)			
CTK	720	2006-2007	61	full	242	32	AA (x6)		very common	
CTK	731	1997-1999	61	full	232	32	D (x6)	MIDI		
CTK	750	1993-1994	61	full	128	32	D (x6)	MIDI	Big brother to ctk-650, 6 control pads, pitch bend wheel, GM, 1 more sequencer track, excellent rhythms, came out just 2 months after the CTK-1000 and uses A2 (A-Square) Synthesis, which is just a PCM playback, but with the polyphony doubled to 32.	
CTK	800	2004-2005	61	full	500	32	D (x6)			
CTK	810	2007	61	full	515	32	AA (x6)			
CTK	811EX	1998	61	full	200	32	D (x6)	MIDI		
CTK	850IN		61	full	600	48	AA (x6)	MIDI		
CTK	860IN		61	full	600	48				
CTK	900	2005	61	full	824	32	D (x6)	MIDI	ZPI processor, no pitch or mod wheels, synth functions, drawbar organ sounds, many user sounds can be saved, 10000 note memory, 4MB flash memory (same as wk-3200/wk-3700), casio music site downloads via MIDI	
CTK	1000	1993	61	full	100	16		MIDI	"IXA Sound Source". It's "Integrated Cross-Sound Architecture" Large Bulky Keyboard with touch sensitivity. Large 2MB ROM. No MIDI dump or sysEX. Elaborate sequencer but no way to store. This was released a few months before the CTK-750. Casio was being sued by Yamaha over FM synthesis patents. There is some mystery around the keyboard and its synth capabilities.	
CTK	1100		61	full	100	12	AA (x6)			
CTK	1150		61	full	100	12	AA (x6)			
CTK	1200		61	full	100	12	AA (x6)			
CTK	1300ES	2013	61			12	AA (x6)			
CTK	1500		61	full	120	32	AA (x6)			
CTK	1550		61	full	120	32	AA (x6)			
CTK	2000	2004-2008	61	full	400	48	AA (x6)	MIDI		
CTK	2080		61	full	400	48	AA (x6)	MIDI		
CTK	2090	2014	61	full	400	48	AA (x6)	MIDI	sampling, 2w speakers	
CTK	2100		61	full	400	48	AA (x6)	MIDI		
CTK	2200		61	full	400	48	AA (x6)	MIDI		
CTK	2300		61	full	400	48	AA (x6)	MIDI		
CTK	2400		61	full	400	48	AA (x6)	MIDI		
CTK	2500	2016	61	full	400	48	AA (x6)	MIDI	100 rhythms, 50 dance mode presets, 60 songs, 30 user songs, 2.0w speakers, same as CTK-2550	
CTK	3000	2004	61	full	400	48	AA (x6)	MIDI		
CTK	3200	2012	61	full	400	48	AA (x6)	MIDI		
CTK	3400SK		61	full	200	48	AA (x6)	MIDI		
CTK	3500	2017	61	full	400	48	AA (x6)	MIDI		
CTK	4000	2008	61	full	570	48	D (x6)	MIDI		
CTK	4200	2011-2013	61	full, weighted	600	48	AA (x6)	MIDI	Has sampling and rhythm editing functions, among others. CTK-4200/WK-220/WK-225, 2.5w speakers	
CTK	4400	2014	61	full	600	48	AA (x6)	MIDI		
CTK	5000	2008	61	full	670	48	D (x6)	MIDI	Has 10 seconds of sampling memory for 5 sounds plus 3 drum sets (of up to 8 sounds each)	
CTK	5200	2013	61	full	600	48	AA (x6)	MIDI		
CTK	6000		61	full	670	48	D (x6)	MIDI		
CTK	6200	2012	61	full	700	48	D (x6)	MIDI	Keyboard two level touch response. Assignable pedal jack. CTK-6200, WK-6000 in 2012	
CTK	6300IN		61	full	700	48	D (x6)	MIDI		
CTK	7000	2010	61	full	800	64	D (x6)	MIDI (via USB)	CTK-7000 (61 key), WK-7500 (76 keys) in 2010, 7.0w speakers	
CTK	7200	2010-2012	61	full	820	64	D (x6)	MIDI	CTK-7200 (61 key), WK-7600 (76 key) in 2012	
CTK	7300IN		61	full	820	64	D (x6)	MIDI		
CT-S	1	2021	61	full	61	64	AA (x6)	MIDI	Available in red, white or black.	
CT-S	100	2019	61	full	122	32	AA (x6)	MIDI		
CT-S	200	2019	61	full	400	48	AA (x6)	MIDI	Available in red, white or black.	
CT-S	300	2019	61	full	400	48	AA (x6)	MIDI	Keyboard two level touch response.	
CT-S	400	2021	61	full	600	48	AA (x6)	MIDI	Keyboard three level touch response. Assignable pedal jack.	
CT-S	500	2022	61	full	800	64	AA (x6)	MIDI		
CT-X	1	1990	61	full	220	12	D (x6)	in/out/thru		
CT-X	700	2018	61	full	600	48	AA (x6)	MIDI	Keyboard three level touch response. Assignable pedal jack.	
CT-X	800	2018	61	full	600	48	AA (x6)	MIDI	Pitch bend wheel / USB port for saving recorded songs	
CT-X	3000	2018	61	full	800	64	D (x6)	MIDI		
CT-X	3100	2018	61	full	800	64	D (x6)	MIDI		
CT-X	5000	2018	61	full	800	64		MIDI		
CT-X	5100	2018	61	full	800	64		MIDI		

== Synthesizers (1984–1988) ==
Line	Model	Year	Keys	Key type	Patches	Polyphony (notes)	Batteries	MIDI	References
CZ	1	1986		full				MIDI	Only CZ with aftertouch.
CZ	101	1984	49	mini			1.5V (x 6)	MIDI	phase distortion synthesis
CZ	230S	1986	49	mini					
CZ	1000	1984	49	full	32			MIDI	
CZ	2000S	1986	61	full				MIDI	
CZ	2600S								
CZ	3000	1986	61	full				MIDI	
CZ	5000	1985	61	full		8		MIDI	8 track sequencer, juno like sounds, built in chorus (lowers poly), heavy and huge, phase distortion synthesis
HT	700	1987	49	mini		8		in/out	
HT	3000	1987	61	full		8	D (x6)	MIDI	Programmable synthesizer with additional RAM card slot. Has pitch bender and modulation wheels. Doesn't send or receive SysEx.
HT	6000	1987	61	full		8	D (x6)	MIDI	Programmable synthesizer with additional RAM card slot. Has pitch bender and modulation wheels. 50% more memory than HT3000.
HZ	600	1987	61	full		8	D (x6)	MIDI	Pro version of HT series synth.
VZ	1	1988	61	full		up to 16		MIDI	Successor of the CZ series. Second generation of Interactive Phase Distortion synthesis.

== K Series (kids keyboards) ==
Series	Model	Year	Keys	Key type	Preset Tones	Polyphony (notes)	Batteries	MIDI	Notes	References
KA	2	1995	32	mini	16	2			Similar to SA-2.	
KA	10	1993	24	mini						
KA	20	1993	32	mini	16	2			Has 5 drum buttons.	

== LK Series (light keyboards with illuminated keys) ==
Series	Model	Year	Keys	Key type	Preset Tones	Polyphony (notes)	Batteries	MIDI	Notes	References
LK	40	2001	61							
LK	43	2002	61	Full		12		MIDI		
LK	94TV	2005	61	full	264	32	D (x6)	MIDI	Keyboard two level touch, RCA TV connections, Assignable pedal jack	
LK	100	2006	61	Full size, waterfall (no velocity detection)	100	12	AA (x6)	MIDI (No GM)	100 Tones, 50 Rhythms, and 100 song Song Bank	
LK	110		61	full	100	12	AA (x6)		100 tones, 100 rhythms, 100 song bank	
LK	135		61	full	120	32	AA (x6)		120 tones, 70 rhythms, 50 Dance Music Rhythms, 100 song bank	
LK	136		61							
LK	165		61		400	48	AA (x6)	MIDI	400 sounds, 150 rhythms, 110 songs, 16 part multitimbral	
LK	175		61	full	400	48	AA (x6)	USB	400 tones, 150 rhythms, 110 songs	
LK	190									
LK	200S		61			32	AA (x6)			
LK	260		61	Touch sensitive			AA (×6)	USB		
LK	265		61	Piano-style	400	48			Digital effects. Compatible with Chordana mobile app.	
LK	270				570					
LK	280	2011	61		600	48				
LK	300TV		61	full w/ velocity	514	32	D (x6)	USB	SD Card, "We Got The Beat" by The Go-Go's	
LK	S250	2019	61	full	400	48	AA (x6)	MIDI	Keyboard two level touch, Assignable pedal jack	
LK	S450	2021	61	full	600	48	AA (x6)	MIDI	Keyboard three level touch, Assignable pedal jack	
ML	1	1994	24	mini	25	2	AA (x6)			
ML	2	1994	32	Mini	25	2	AA (x6)			

== M Series (mini keyboards) ==
Series	Model	Year	Keys	Key type	Preset Tones	Polyphony (notes)	Batteries	MIDI	Notes	References
M	10		32	mini						
MA	100		49	mini	100	8	AA (x5)			
MA	120	1993	49	mini	100	8	AA (x5)			
MA	150		49	mini	50	8	C (x6)	MIDI	MIDI out only. Has 5 drum pads.	
MT	11		32	mini	8	8	AA (x5)			
MT	18	1986	32	mini	8		AA (x5)		Semi-analogue monophonic sound generator with simple analog percussion. Polyphonic chord buttons. Plays songs from Casio ROM Packs.	
MT	28	1987	32	mini	12	6	AA (x5)		Plays songs from Casio ROM Packs.	
MT	30	1980	37	mini	22	8	D (x5)			
MT	31		37	mini		8	D (x5)			
MT	35	1984	44	mini			AA (x5)			
MT	36	1986	44	mini		8	AA (x5)		Toshiba TMP8049P CPU for voices and HD43720 CPU for accompaniment	
MT	40	1981	37	mini	22	8	D (x5)		Includes bass section of 15 button keys. Analogue programming. Keyboard on which the Sleng Teng riddim was originally composed.	
MT	41	1984	37	mini	22	8	D (x5)		Includes bass section of 15 button keys. A minor update to the MT-40 including slower decay on the bass, a thinner sound, etc. Analogue programming.	
MT	45	1982	49	mini	8	8	D (x5)	-	Analogue square-wave based tones.	
MT	46	1982	49	mini	8	8	D (x5)	-	Colour variation of MT-45.	
MT	52	1985	44	mini			AA (x5)			
MT	55		44	mini			AA (x5)			
MT	60	1982	49	mini		8	D (x5)		Arpeggiator can be played without rhythm accompaniment, MJ Thriller used 'Frog' preset	
MT	65	1983	49	mini	20	8	D (x5)		Upgraded MT-100	
MT	68	1983	49	mini	20		D (x5)		Colour Variation of MT-65	
MT	70	1982	49	mini		8	D (x5)		Uses sine wave programming instead of the more favored square waves (by Casio).	
MT	85		49	mini	12	8	D (x5)		Plays songs from Casio ROM Packs.	
MT	86		49	mini	12	8	D (x5)		Colour variation of MT-85.	
MT	90	1986	49	mini		8			Larger version of MT-36.	
MT	100	1983?	49	mini		8	D (x5)		Has a 5-band graphic equalizer	
MT	105		44	mini			AA (x6)			
MT	110		49	mini			AA (x6)			
MT	140		49	mini	210	10	AA (x6)			
MT	200		49	mini	8					
MT	205		49	mini		8	AA (x6)		Has PCM-based "Super Drums".	
MT	210		49	mini			D (x6)			
MT	220	1987	49	mini		8	AA (x6)		Has PCM-based "Super Drums".	
MT	240		49	mini	210		AA (x6)	MIDI	MIDI in/out only (no thru).	
MT	260		49	mini	210	10	AA (x6)	MIDI	MIDI in/out only (no thru).	
MT	400V	1984	49	mini	20	8 (4 when accompaniment is selected).	D (x6)		Has analog filter controls.	
MT	500	1986	49	mini			D (x6)		Has PCM-based "Super Drums".	
MT	540		49	mini	210	10	AA (x6)	MIDI	Has PCM "Sound Effect" section. When used as a MIDI tone generator, 30 tones are available, as per the CT-460.	
MT	600	1987	49	mini	40	8	D (x6)	MIDI	Preset-only home version of Casio's Spectrum Dynamic (SD) synthesizers.	
MT	640	1988	49	mini	210	10	D (x6)	MIDI	MIDI in/out only (no thru).	
MT	750	1989	61	mini	220	12	D (x6)	MIDI	Has "Tone Editor" with detune, delay, attack/decay and release.	
MT	800	1983	49	mini		8	D (x6)		Plays songs from Casio ROM Packs.	
MT	820		49	mini		8			Plays songs from Casio ROM Packs.	

== P Series (petite keyboards) ==
Series	Model	Year	Keys	Key type	Preset Tones	Polyphony (notes)	Batteries	MIDI	Notes	References
PA	31		32	mini	100	4				
PA	81		32	mini	100					
PK	1	1985	32	petite	16				PCM tones.	
PK	5		32	petite	16					
PT	1	1985	29	petite		1	AA (x4)		Stripped-down version of VL-1.	
PT	7	1984	29	foil		8			Box with cabled, detachable foil keyboard	
PT	10	1987	29	mini	4	1	AA (x4)	–		
PT	12		29	mini	4		AA (x4)			
PT	20	1983	29	mini	7	1	AA (x5)		Mildly stripped-down version of the PT-30. No transpose function, and combined balance slider between Rhythm and Melody volumes.	
PT	22	1990	29	mini	4	1				
PT	30	1983	31	mini	8	1	AA (x5)		Has small LCD. Has chord button section.	
PT	31	1983	31	mini	8	1	AA (x5)		As the PT-30 with a dark grey case instead of white.	
PT	50	1983	31	mini		1	AA (x5)		Has small LCD. Has chord button section. Plays songs from Casio ROM Packs.	
PT	80	1984	32	mini	8	1	AA (x5)		Plays songs from Casio ROM Packs.	
PT	82		32	mini		1	AA (x5)		Plays songs from Casio ROM Packs.	
PT	87		32	mini		1	AA (x5)		Plays songs from Casio ROM Packs.	
PT	88		32	mini					5 drum pad buttons. Plays songs from Casio ROM Packs. Similar to Casio SA-1.	
PT	100	1987	32	mini	8	8	AA (x5)		8 note main voice polyphony (only 6 with rhythm, only 4 with accompaniment) No ROM pack.	
PT	180		32			6			Plays songs from Casio ROM Packs.	
PT	280		32						Plays songs from Casio ROM Packs. Has sampling function (similar to SK-1).	
PT	380		32			6(3)	AA (x5)		Only some of the instruments support 6 tone polyphony, most just cut off the first 3 notes.	
PT	480		32							

== S Series (sampler keyboards) ==
Series	Model	Year	Keys	Key type	Preset Tones	Polyphony (notes)	Batteries	MIDI	Notes	References
SA	1	1989	32	mini	100	2	AA (x4)			
SA	2	1995	32	mini	16	2	AA (x4)		Severely crippled SA-5 with only two volume levels.	
SA	3	1993	32	mini	25	2			Has 4 drum buttons.	
SA	5	1991	32	mini	100	2	AA (x4)	-		
SA	6	1993	32	mini	100	4			Curvy chassis with 5 drum pads and drum illustration.	
SA	7	1989	32	mini	100	2				
SA	8	1993	32	mini	25	2	AA (x4)		Has 4 drum buttons. Similar to SA-3.	
SA	9	1989	32	mini	100	4				
SA	10	1990	32	mini	100	4	AA (x5)			
SA	11	1990	32	mini	100	4	AA (x5)			
SA	20	1990	32	mini	100	4	AA (x5)			
SA	21	1992	32	mini	100	4	AA (x5)		Has 5 drum buttons.	
SA	25	1991	32	mini	100	4			Has 5 drum buttons.	
SA	35	1992	32	mini	100	4	AA (x5)			
SA	38	1997	32	mini	100	4			Has 5 drum buttons.	
SA	39	1997	32	mini	100	4	AA (×5)		Has 5 drum buttons.	
SA	40	1995	32	mini						
SA	41	1997	32	mini	100	4			Has 5 drum buttons.	
SA	45	2000	32	mini	100	4	AA (x5)		Has 5 drum pads.	
SA	46	2010	32	mini	100	8	AA (x6)		Has 5 drum pads.	
SA	47	2010	32	mini	100	8	AA (x6)		Has 5 drum pads.	
SA	50	2022	32	mini	100	32	AA (x6)			
SA	51	2022	32	mini	100	32	AA (x6)			
SA	65	1997	37	mini	100	4	AA (x5)			
SA	67	1997	37	mini	100	4	AA (x5)			
SA	75	2000	37	mini	100	4	AA (x5)			
SA	76	2010	44	mini	100	8	AA (x6)		Has 5 drum buttons.	
SA	77	2010	44	mini	100	8	AA (x6)		Has 5 drum buttons.	
SA	78	2010	44	mini	100	8	AA (x6)		Has 5 drum buttons.	
SA	80	2023	44	mini	100	32	AA (x6)			
SA	81	2023	44	mini	100	32	AA (x6)			
SK	1	1985	32	petite		4			Holds 1 sample. Also released by Radioshack as Realistic Concertmate 500	
SK	2		32	petite	5	4			No line out	
SK	5	1987	32	petite	8				Holds 4 samples. Reverse, loop and tune samples with four envelopes	
SK	8		32	petite	8	4			Plays Casio ROM Packs	
SK	8A		32	petite					Similar to SK-8 but aimed at middle eastern market	
SK	10		32	petite	5				Trimmed down SK-1	
SK	60		32	petite						
SK	100		49	mini	14	8			Can record up to 1.62 seconds of sound at 10.113 kHz.	
SK	200		49	mini	12	8			Same as SK-100 but has stereo speakers	
SK	2100	1987	49	full size	12	8	D (x6)		Same as SK200 but with full size keys	

== T Series (tape keyboards) ==
Series	Model	Year	Keys	Key type	Preset Tones	Polyphony (notes)	Batteries	MIDI	Notes	References
TA	10	1992	32	mini	25				Has 3 drum buttons. Cassette Tape	

== VL Series (button keyboards) ==
Series	Model	Year	Keys	Key type	Preset Tones	Polyphony (notes)	Batteries	MIDI	Notes	References
VL	1(known as VL-tone)	1979	29	button	11 (5+5+1) (5 tones with switch button, another 5 tones in CAL programming ADSR mode and one memory tone to save ADSR sound)	1		No	ADSR synth function in memory	
VL	5		37	button	10	4		No	With barcode reader. It possible play notes while a memory recording is playing at same times. Not includes ADSR but conserve a button to configure sustain.	
VL	10		29	button	3	1		No		
VL	80		16 (full tones) includes another button to convert to semi-tones.	calculator button	1	1		No	It's a micro calculator. It has capacity to record, play demo music, vibrato switch, and tempo function. Demo -melody is same VL-1 and it hasn't rhythms.	

== CDP Series (88-key digital pianos) ==
Series	Model	Year	Keys	Key type	Preset Tones	Polyphony (notes)	Batteries	MIDI	Notes	References
CDP	130R		88	full						
CDP	200R		88	full	670	48				
CDP	220R		88	full	700	48				
CDP	230R		88	full	700	48				
CDP	235R		88	full	700	64				
CDP	240R		88	full	700	64				
CDP	S150		88	full						
CDP	S350		88	full	700	64				

== Other ==
Series	Model	Year	Keys	Key type	Preset Tones	Polyphony (notes)	Batteries	MIDI	Notes	References
CA	100	1989	49	full size	100	8	AA (x6)		PCM Tonebank keyboard. Poly/texture effect button toggles polyphony between 4 and 8 notes to provide thin/thick variations of tone.	
CA	110	1992	49	full size	100	8	AA (x6)		PCM Tonebank keyboard. Poly/texture effect button toggles polyphony between 4 and 8 notes to provide thin/thick variations of tone.	
CA	301		49	full size	100			-	PCM Tonebank keyboard. Poly/texture effect button toggles polyphony between 4 and 8 notes to provide thin/thick variations of tone.	
CA	401	1989	49	full size	100			-	PCM Tonebank keyboard. Poly/texture effect button toggles polyphony between 4 and 8 notes to provide thin/thick variations of tone.	
CPS	7		76	full size	5	24	D(x6)	In/Out	Touch sensitive. Sounds can be layered. Transposable +/- 1 octave. Can be powered through automobile (12V) power.	
CPS	101		61	full size	10	8	D(x6)	In/Out/Thru	Touch sensitive. Sustain pedal support. Sounds cannot be layered. Tunable, but not transposable. Can be powered through automobile (12V) power. Excellent MIDI support.	
CPS	85		88	full size	10	24				
CPS	201	1986	61	full size	5	24	D(x6)	In/Out/Thru	Touch sensitive.	
CK	10		29	petite	4	1	AA (x4)	-	Built-in AM/FM radio and permanently attached antenna.	
CK	200	1985	29	petite					Boombox with built-in keyboard and cassette deck.	
CK	500		49	mini	8				Built in AM/FM radio, keyboard and dual cassette decks.	
DJ	1		32	mini					Successor to RAP-1, with added cassette deck and second platter controller.	
DM	100	1985?	49/32	mini	210				Double deck sampling keyboard (mt-240 below with the 210 tone bank and a sk1 above).	
GZ	5		32	mini	0		AA (x4)	out	Midi master keyboard only. Has slider controls for velocity and octave, many buttons and two wheel controllers.	
KX	101			mini	9	4			Boombox with built-in keyboard and cassette deck.	
PA	31	1992	32	mini	100	4	AA (x5)	-	8 voice buttons and voice pad controller. Curvy chassis.	
RAP	1	1991	32	mini	30				"Rapman" with turntable controller, drum pads and mini keyboard.	
VA	10	1994	32	mid sized	100	6			"Voice arranger" with vocoder and other effects.	
WK	110	2007	76	full, weighted	515	32	D (x6)	MIDI (via USB)	CTK-810 (61 keys)/WK-110 (76 keys), 2.5w speakers	
WK	200	2008	76	full	570	48	D (x6)	MIDI (via USB)	2.5w speakers, 9v, USB B, 180 rhythms, no pitch wheel, silver	
WK	210	2009	76	full	570	48	D (x6)	MIDI (via USB)	2.5w speakers, silver	
WK	220	2011	76		600	48	D (x6)	MIDI (via USB)	CTK-4200/WK-220/WK-225, 2.5w speakers. Has sampling and rhythm editing functions, among others.	
WK	225	2011	76		600	48	D (x6)	MIDI (via USB)	CTK-4200/WK-220/WK-225, 2.5w speakers. Has sampling and rhythm editing functions, among others.	
WK	240	2014	76	full, weighted	600	48	D (x6)	MIDI (via USB)	AHL sound source.	
WK	245	2014								
WK	500	2008	76	full	670	48	D (x6)	MIDI (via USB)	6.0w speakers, 12v, line out L&R jacks, USB B, SD Card, 200 rhythms, pitch bend wheel, black	
WK	1200	1997	73	full	200	24	D (x6)	MIDI	8 preset drum kits, 100 rhythms, 2-song, 6-track memory, related: wk-1250	
WK	1250	1997	73	full	200	24	D (x6)	MIDI	8 preset drum kits, 100 rhythms, 2-song, 6-track memory, related: wk-1200	
WK	1600	2000	76	full	232	32	D (x6)	MIDI	16 part multitimbral, 8 preset drum kits, 130 rhythms, 2-song, 6-track memory, related: wk-1600/wk-1630/wk-1800	
WK	1630	2000	76	full	232	32	D (x6)	MIDI	16 part multitimbral, 8 preset drum kits, 130 rhythms, 2-song, 6-track memory, related: wk-1600/wk-1630/wk-1800/radio shack md-1700	
WK	1800	2000	76	full	232	32	D (x6)	MIDI	16 part multitimbral, 8 preset drum kits, 130 rhythms, related: wk-1600/wk-1630/wk-1800	
WK	3000	2003	76	full	790	32		MIDI	3.3v smartmedia	
WK	3100	2004	76	full	790	32		MIDI	3.3v smartmedia	
WK	3200	2005	76	full	824	32	D (x6)	MIDI	Pitch Bend Wheel; Nearly identical to the WK-3700 except no modulation wheel, drawbar organ controls, ZPI processor, strong DSP effects, no floppy	
WK	3300	2006			894				wk-3300, wk-3800, wk-8000 all 2006 models, SD memory card. DSP modulation settings	
WK	3500	2003	76	full	790	32		MIDI	3.3v smartmedia, floppy drive, 2 additional outputs	
WK	3700	2005	76	full	824	32	D (x6)	MIDI	CTK-900, WK-3200 and WK-3700 are related ZPI processor, 3700 has mod wheel and pitch bend wheel, floppy and smart media, drawbar organ controls, strong DSP effects, 2 additional audio outs. no SD card	
WK	3800	2006	76	full	894	32	D(x6)	MIDI	wk-3300, wk-3800, wk-8000 all 2006 models, up to 1GB SD card, floppy drive	
WK	6600	2012	76	full	700	48	D (x6)	MIDI	Keyboard two level touch response. Assignable pedal jack. CTK-6200, WK-6600 models in 2012	
WK	7500	2010	76	full	800	64	D (x6)	MIDI (via USB)	CTK-7000 (61 key), WK-7500 (76 keys) in 2010, 7.0w speakers	
WK	7600	2012	76	full, weighted	820	64		MIDI (via USB)	CTK-7200 (61 key), WK-7600 (76 key) in 2012	
WK	8000	2006	88		894	48			wk-3300, wk-3800, wk-8000 all 2006 models, SD memory card	
XW	G1	2012	61					MIDI	Professional synthesizer	
XW	P1	2012	61					MIDI	Professional synthesizer	
