= Okuda Hiroko =

Japanese inventor and musicologist

- 奥田 広子
- Born: Okuda Hiroko c. 1957; Nagasaki, Japan
- Education: Kunitachi College of Music, 1980
- Occupations: Inventor and musicologist
- Known for: Composition of the Sleng Teng Riddim; Numerous electronic instrument inventions

Okuda Hiroko (Japanese: 奥田 広子, romanized: Okuda Hiroko) is a Japanese inventor and musicologist. At the start of her career in 1980, she composed the rhythm and bass preset backing tracks included in Casio's electronic keyboards. These included the "rock" rhythm, which became the ubiquitous Sleng Teng Riddim, heralded the ragga movement, and has since underpinned hundreds of hit reggae songs. Okuda and Casio have allowed her backing-rhythm work to proliferate under a free attribution-only license, which have contributed to their widespread use. Okuda holds more than a dozen patents in the fields of electronic musical instruments and presently works at the intersection of electronic music and visual art.

== Childhood and education ==
Okuda, a pianist from childhood, became a fan of British rock music in middle school, and this developed into a deep interest in Jamaican reggae in the 1970s. Okuda attended a musical high school, and then Kunitachi College of Music, where she studied musicology with an emphasis on Reggae, the topic upon which she wrote her graduation thesis. While a college student in 1979, Okuda attended several of Bob Marley's concerts, on his only visit to Japan.

"Reggae is generally agreed to lie at the roots of hip-hop and rap and other styles of DJ music. The music also had a huge influence on British rock. The lyrics had a strong social and political message, but they were performed in this light, breezy style. I think that contrast was what attracted me to the music."

== Early career ==
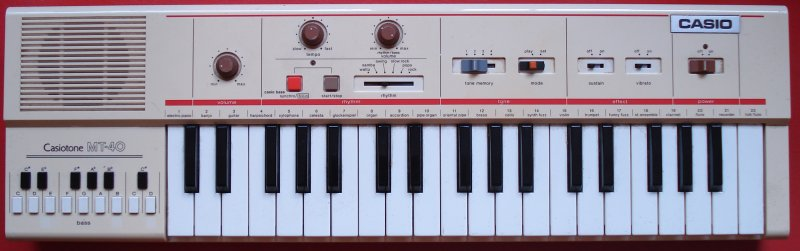
Casio's 1981 Casiotone MT-40, the first electronic keyboard to include Okuda's backing tracks.

Okuda joined Casio in April 1980, upon graduation. Her first assignment was to develop six two-bar rhythm and bass preset backing tracks which would be used in the Casiotone Casio MT-40 and Casio's other contemporaneous keyboards. The six styles were "rock," "samba," "disco," "waltz," "swing," and "pop." The "rock" style was soon to be made famous in Jamaican dancehalls. The MT-40's "rock" preset, along with the keyboard's suggested 1/16 note fill for that preset, formed the basis of Wayne Smith and King Jammy's 1985 reggae hit "Under Me Sleng Teng", which went on to spawn nearly 500 cover versions. This song's success is widely credited with single-handedly transitioning reggae from analog to computerized production. The preset is accessed by pressing the "synchro" button and then the "D" bass button (second from left) while the MT-40 rhythm slider is in the "rock" position. Although the original MT-40 was only produced for about a year, and its "rock" rhythm was retired with it, its ongoing popularity led Casio to bring it back in 2010 in their SA-46 and SA-76 keyboards, this time under the name "MT40 Riddim".

The process Okuda used to create these presets was highly technical and far removed from traditional musical composition. To compose the presets involved converting "a musical score into code, record[ing] the code onto a ROM, and then insert[ing] the memory into a specialized machine. Only then could you listen to the rhythm pattern you had written."

== Sleng Teng and use in popular music ==
The "rock" preset is not usable at a normal rock and roll tempo (around 172 bpm). Only when the tempo knob is turned down to the 80-110 bpm range, home to reggae and dub, does it become possible to play an accompaniment to the "rock" preset. Okuda only learned of her part in "Under Me Sleng Teng"'s global success in August 1986, when she read an article titled "The Sleng Teng Flood" in Japan's Music Magazine. The article described the wave of dozens and dozens of reggae songs being produced in Jamaica, all based on a Casiotone keyboard preset.

=== Speculation about the source of the "rock" preset ===
After the worldwide success of Sleng Teng many speculated as to the ultimate source of the "rock" preset. At first Eddie Cochran's 1958 song "Somethin' Else" or the Sex Pistols' 1976 track "Anarchy in the UK" were thought to be prime candidates, with "Somethin' Else" being widely accepted for decades by connoisseurs. In 2015 Okuda was quoted as saying the source was a track on an unnamed 1970's British rock album. This was later speculated to be the intro to David Bowie's "Hang On to Yourself", the 8th track on his 1972 album The Rise and Fall of Ziggy Stardust and the Spiders from Mars. However, referring to the question in 2022, Okuda said, "I did use to listen to a lot of British rock, so I'm sure there must have been songs that influenced me. But really, the bassline was something I came up with myself. It wasn't based on any other tune."

Okuda has said that she had in mind to create a drum-and-bass line that would be easy to "toast" over, and attributes much of the success of the backing track to its simplicity, which allowed musicians to flexibly layer many types of compositions over it. She recalled that, "[i]n those days, my head was full of reggae. Even when I was trying to come up with a rock beat, I think it just naturally came out as something that would work in reggae as well."

=== Aftermath ===
According to Okuda, there was some talk at the Casio corporation of attempting to defend their intellectual property from its free use in "Under Me Sleng Teng" with lawsuits. In response, Okuda and her supervisor at the time discussed how to handle the Sleng Teng riddim. Believing that widespread use of the rhythm would help increase recognition of the Casiotone brand, they decided not to charge licensing fees for use of the "rock" preset. To the present day Casio's response to clearance requests for the "rock" preset has been an acknowledgement that the song "uses a sound file taken from a Casio MT-40", and no fee.

Since this breakthrough, Okuda's influence has become widespread, with her samples appearing in hip-hop and rap music, like 2 Live Crew's Reggae Joint and then rave music, like Moby's remix of Everybody in the Place.

== Present work ==
Okuda works in Casio's R&D Center in Hamura, in the Tokyo suburbs.

Her recent work includes real-time automated visual accompaniment for music performance, which she calls "music tapestry."

- "Music Tapestry" on YouTube

== Patents ==
- US patent 10803844, "Electronic musical instrument", published 30 May 2019
- US patent 10360884, "Electronic wind instrument and method of controlling electronic wind instrument", published 20 September 2018
- US patent 9384716, "Automatic key adjusting apparatus and method", published 13 August 2015
- US patent 9018505, "A method of automatically playing accompaniment", published 18 September 2014
- US patent 8907197, "Performance information processing apparatus, determining tempo and meter based on performance", published 6 March 2014
- US patent 8648241, "Key determination apparatus", published 29 March 2012
- US patent 8324493, "Electronic musical instrument", published 4 August 2011
- US patent 8314320, "Automatic accompanying apparatus", published 4 August 2011
- US patent 5375501, "Automatic melody composer", published 27 December 1994
- US patent 5302777, "Music apparatus for determining tonality from chord progression for improved accompaniment", published 12 April 1994
- US patent 5179241, "Apparatus for determining tonality for chord progression", published 12 January 1993
- US patent 4875400, "Electronic musical instrument with touch response function", published 24 October 1989
- US patent 4685370, "Automatic rhythm playing apparatus having plurality of rhythm patterns", published 11 August 1987
- US patent 4643068, "Electronic musical instrument with automatic rhythm playing unit", published 17 February 1987
