= Michael Palmer (musician) =

Jamaican singer (b1960)

- Born: 1960 (age 65–66); Maxfield Park, Kingston, Jamaica
- Genres: Reggae, dancehall
- Occupations: Singer, record producer
- Instrument: Vocals
- Years active: Late 1970s–present
- Labels: Greensleeves; Power House; Midnight Rock; Vista Sounds; Negus Roots

Michael Palmer (born 1960), also known as Palma Dog, is a Jamaican reggae musician who released several albums in the 1980s.

== Biography ==
He was born in the Maxfield Park area of Kingston in 1960, Palmer began his career in the late 1970s by performing with sound systems, including Stereophonic Sound with General Echo. He took inspiration from the success of his neighbor, Leroy Smart. The shooting death of Echo and Stereophonic's owner Big John in 1980 was a blow to Palmer's career. His debut single, "Mr Landlord" (1975), recorded for producer Oswald Thomas was not successful, and it was not until a couple of years later when he found success with "Smoke the Weed", recorded at Channel One, and with producer Jah Thomas on tracks such as "Ghetto Dance" and "Different Love". He went on to work with a variety of producers including George Phang, Sugar Minott, Prince Jammy, and Joseph Hoo Kim, and enjoyed a number one single in Jamaica in 1984 with the Phang-produced "Lick Shot". He also performed at the Reggae Sunsplash festival that year. His recordings led to a series of mid-1980s albums, including split albums with Frankie Jones, Frankie Paul, Johnny Osbourne, and Kelly Ranks.

Palmer moved into production, achieving success with Neville Brown's "Haul and Pull Up", and returned to recording himself in the early 1990s, with singles such as "Juggling" and "Everyone Makes Love". After being advised to give up singing due to vocal problems, Palmer moved to the United States and was out of the music industry for almost 20 years.

Michael Palmer's distinctive vocal styling had a significant influence on the emerging digital reggae scene of the mid 1980s, an influence that extended into the early ragga, jungle music and drum and bass scenes in London in the early to mid 1990s.Palmer returned to music in the 21st century, performing in the US, and released new music in 2017. Michael Palmer has teamed up with his new manager Barrington Gray, Cedar Valley Records (Sweden) and producer/engineer Andre "Tripple T" Daley (Jamaica) the magician behind some of the Exterminator Label most memorable mixes, a number of new tracks will be released in 2018 by this team.

== Discography ==
- Lickshot (1982), Power House
- Star Performer (1984), Tonos
- Pull It Up Now (1985), Greensleeves
- Angella (1984), Vista Sounds
- Showdown vol. 4 (1984), Hitbound/Empire – with Frankie Jones
- Double Trouble (1985), Greensleeves – with Frankie Paul
- Ghetto Living (1985), Bebo's
- I'm So Attractive (1985), Jammy's
- Sweet Daddy (1985), Black Scorpio
- We Rule (1985), Power House
- Michael Palmer Meets Kelly Ranks at Channel One (1985), Dancefloor
- Wicked (1985), Vibes & Vibes – with Johnny Osbourne
- Showcase – I'm Still Dancing (198?), Midnight Rock
- Joint Favourites (1986), Greensleeves – with Half Pint
- Where Is That Love (2018), Cedar Valley Records

Compilations

- Triston Palma Meets Michael Palmer, Midnight Rock – with Triston Palmer
