= Frankie Jones (reggae singer) =

Jamaican reggae singer

Frankie Jones, also known as Jah Frankie Jones, is a Jamaican reggae singer best known for his recordings of the late 1970s and 1980s.

== Biography ==
Jones was born in the Greenwich Farm area of Kingston. He had his first hit in the late 1970s with "Sweeten My Coffee", recorded at Channel One Studios, and also recorded for Bunny Lee, Lee producing his debut album Satta An Praise Jah, released in 1977. He also recorded for Bertram Brown's Freedom Sounds label in the late 1970s. In 1984 he had several hits including "Settle for Me", "Modelling Girl", and the same another album was released, a split Showdown with Michael Palmer. Another split album, with Patrick Andy, was released in 1985, along with the album Settlement. In 1986 Trojan Records released a collection of earlier Keith Wignall-produced recordings as The Best of Frankie Jones volume one. Jones also recorded for Prince Jammy, and George Phang. the latter producing his 1986 album Old Fire Stick. Another split album was released in 1986, the Hell in the Dance set split with Pad Anthony, on which the singers were backed by the Roots Radics.

== Discography ==
- Satta An Praise Jah (1977), Third World
- Showdown Volume 4 (1984), Hitbound/Empire – with Michael Palmer
- Two New Superstars (1985), Burning Sounds – with Patrick Andy
- Settlement (1985), Blue Mountain
- Them Nice (1985), Sunset
- Old Fire Stick (1986), Power House
- Who Nuh Hear Me Yet (19??), Wackies

Compilations

- The Best of Frankie Jones volume one (1986), Trojan
- Sings Roots and Culture vol. 2 (2002), Fatman – with Johnny Clarke
