= Wayne Smith (musician) =

Jamaican reggae and dancehall musician (1965–2014)

- Wayne Smith

Background information
- Born: 5 December 1965; Kingston, Jamaica
- Died: 17 February 2014 (aged 48) Kingston, Jamaica
- Genres: Reggae, dancehall
- Occupation: Musician
- Years active: Late 1970s–2014

Wayne Smith (born Ian Flemmings Smith; born 5 December 1965 – 17 February 2014) was a Jamaican reggae and dancehall musician best known for his 1985 hit "Under Me Sleng Teng", which is regarded as the track which initiated the digital era of reggae.

== Biography ==
Smith grew up in the Waterhouse area of Kingston, Jamaica. He performed with sound systems and began recording in 1980 at age 14, initially working with producer Prince Jammy, his next door neighbour, who produced his debut album Youthman Skanking (1982) and the 1985 follow-up Smoker Super. Wayne Smith's early musical styles and lyrical meditations are consciously educated in, and grounded in an earlier roots reggae awareness, but slowed down in the spacious dancehall style of the time, backed by Earl "Chinna" Smith's High Times Players, Roots Radics, and with Scientist and King Tubby at the controls.

By the mid-1980s, Wayne Smith embarked on the most influential period of his career, as reggae studios, sound engineers and producers moved away from the use of real instruments to a digitally based approach to sound. The change to digital was to have long term effects in music, namely in its significant influence on ragga and the creation of jungle music, rave and drum and bass, and Smith's 1985 recording of "(Under Mi) Sleng teng", is generally regarded as the beginning of ragga style reggae. The rhythm was a preset pattern programmed into the Casio MT-40 by Okuda Hiroko who was still in her first year with the company after producing one of Japan's first master's theses on reggae. The lyrics were inspired by Barrington Levy's "Under Mi Sensi". Although there are a number of conflicting stories about how it was first found, the commonly accepted view is that Wayne Smith and Noel Davey discovered it. Smith had further hits with "Come Along," which used the Stalag riddim, and "Ain't No Meaning in Saying Goodbye".

After leaving Jamaica for New York in 1989, he established his own record label, Sleng Teng Records. He worked as well with several record producers from New York, Jamaica and Europe, such as Heartical Sound and Evidence Music. In 2011, Smith made his first European tour with Little Lion Sound from Switzerland. He returned to live in Jamaica in 2013 with his youngest daughter Arella and fiancé Fiona, settling in Mandeville.

At the time of his death he was married to an American citizen named Valerie Weighall. Smith was admitted to Kingston Public Hospital on 14 February 2014 with severe stomach pains, and died on 17 February 2014, aged 48. He was survived by five children and three grandchildren.

== Discography ==
- Youthman Skanking (1982), Black Joy
- Smoker Super (1985), Chartbound
- Wicked Inna Dancehall, Rohit
- Showdown Vol. 7 (1986), Hitbound – split with Patrick Andy
- Sleng Teng (1986), Greensleeves
- Sleng Teng + Computerised Dub (1986), Greensleeves – split with Prince Jammy
