= Arnold Corns =

British band formed by David Bowie in 1971

Arnold Corns was a band, formed by David Bowie in 1971, the name of which was inspired by the Pink Floyd song "Arnold Layne".

== History ==
This was one of Bowie's side projects and something of a dry run for Ziggy Stardust. The band was formed in Dulwich College and Bowie agreed to write for them. At the same time he also agreed to write for the 19-year-old designer Freddie Burretti (born: Frederick Burrett, aka Rudi Valentino). Bowie came up with the idea of combining Burretti and Arnold Corns, and with the help of the trio of Mick Ronson, Mick Woodmansey and Trevor Bolder, a revised version of Arnold Corns was created during the spring of 1971. Bowie was writing material that later became Hunky Dory, as well as songs earmarked for Burretti, and Oliver Abraham was briefly given credit for helping with the majority of the songs. Burretti as the frontman was a total fabrication.

The first session by the band, on 10 March 1971, which included "Lady Stardust", "Right on Mother" and "Moonage Daydream" was recorded at the Radio Luxembourg Studios. This was followed by a session, recorded at the Trident Studios on 4 June 1971, which included "Man in the Middle" and "Looking for a Friend".

The band's first single, "Moonage Daydream" (with a spoken intro "whenever you're ready") / "Hang On to Yourself", was released on B&C Records on 7 May 1971 and was a flop. Both these songs later reappeared on Ziggy Stardust in new versions with updated lyrics. The Arnold Corns versions appeared as bonus tracks on the Rykodisc CD re-release of The Man Who Sold the World (minus the spoken intro on "Moonage Daydream").

A second single, "Looking for a Friend" / "Man in the Middle" (vocals by Valentino), was planned but scrapped (it was released in 1985 by Krazy Kat Records). In August 1972, B&C Records issued "Hang on to Yourself" / "Man in the Middle" as the second single.

Burretti designed a number of suits with Bowie, now displayed at the Victoria and Albert Museum.

== Band members ==
- David Bowie – vocals, guitar, piano
- Freddie Burretti – vocals
- Mick Ronson – guitar
- Mark Carr-Pritchard – guitar, vocals
- Trevor Bolder – bass guitar
- Mick Woodmansey – drums

The core band members were Bowie, Carr-Pritchard (real name Mark Pritchett), bassist Peter 'Polak' DeSomogyi, and drummer Tim 'St Laurent' Broadbent.

Burretti never sang on any of their recordings. The above personnel appear on the "Moonage Daydream" / "Hang Onto Yourself" session. Ronson, Bolder and Woodmansey participated in later recording sessions.

Carr-Pritchard is the lead-vocalist on "Man in the Middle", which he reportedly wrote (though the song is attributed to Bowie).

A third vocalist heard with Bowie and Carr-Pritchard on "Looking For a Friend" is assumed to be Micky King (who recorded the Bowie composition "Rupert the Riley").
