= Ragga =

Sub-genre of dancehall music and reggae

- Stylistic origins: Dancehall; reggae; electronic; rocksteady; ska
- Cultural origins: 1980s, Jamaica

Fusion genres
- Ragga hip-hop; bouyon-muffin; ragga jungle

Raggamuffin music (or simply ragga) is a subgenre of dancehall and reggae music. The instrumentals primarily consist of electronic music with heavy use of sampling.

Wayne Smith's "Under Mi Sleng Teng", produced by King Jammy in 1985 on a Casio MT-40 synthesizer, is a seminal ragga song. "Sleng Teng" boosted Jammy's popularity immensely, and other producers quickly released their own versions of the riddim, accompanied by dozens of different vocalists.

== Origins ==
Ragga originated in Jamaica during the 1980s, at the same time that electronic dance music's popularity was increasing globally. It differs marginally from its dancehall predecessor "other than a slightly more aggressive attitude, and an alignment with the kind of concerns of its youthful audience". Ragga spread to Europe, North America, and Africa, eventually spreading to Japan, India, and the rest of the world. Ragga heavily influenced early jungle music, and also spawned the syncretistic bhangragga style when fused with bhangra. In the 1990s, ragga and breakcore music fused, creating a style known as raggacore.

Ragga also brought with its own fashion designers. Andrew Dunbar working in London produced designs, one of which showed at the Victoria & Albert Museum's 1994 'Street Style' Street Style exhibition.

The term "raggamuffin" is an intentional misspelling of "ragamuffin", a word that entered the Jamaican Patois lexicon after the British Empire colonized Jamaica in the 17th century. Despite the British colonialists' pejorative application of the term, Jamaican youth appropriated it as an ingroup designation. The term "raggamuffin music" describes the music of Jamaica's "ghetto dwellers".

== Ragga and hip-hop ==
King Jammy produced the 1985 hit, "(Under Mi) Sleng Teng" by Wayne Smith. In the late 1980s, Jamaican deejay Daddy Freddy and Asher D's "Ragamuffin Hip-Hop" became the first multinational single to feature the word "ragga" in its title.

== See also ==
- Reggae
- Ska
- Bouyon-muffin

== Bibliography ==
- Todd Souvignier: The World of DJs and the Turntable Culture
- Stascha (Staša) Bader: Worte wie Feuer: Dancehall Reggae und Raggamuffin. Words Like Fire. Dancehall Reggae and Raggamuffin. Dissertation Thesis at the Zurich University, 1986. Buchverlag Michael Schwinn, Neustadt, Deutschland, 1. Aufl. 1988, 2. Aufl. 1992
- René Wynands: Do The Reggae. Reggae von Pocomania bis Ragga und der Mythos Bob Marley. Pieper Verlag und Schott. 1995 ISBN 3-492-18409-X (Pieper), ISBN 3-7957-8409-3 (Schott) Online-Version
- Norman C. Stolzoff: Wake the Town and Tell the People. Dancehall Culture in Jamaica. Durham; London: Duke University Press, 2000. ISBN 0-8223-2478-4
