= Sonjah Stanley Niaah =

Jamaican scholar

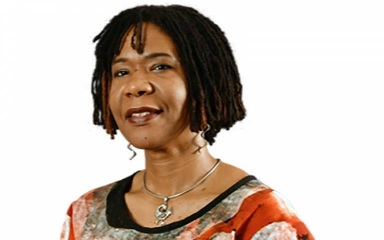

Academic background
- Education: University of the West Indies
- Thesis: Kingston's dancehall : a story of space and celebration (2004)

Sonjah Stanley Niaah is a Jamaican scholar, cultural activist, and writer. She is known for her work on dancehall, old and new Black Atlantic performance geographies, ritual, dance, festivals, cultural and creative industries, as well as popular culture and the sacred.

== Education and career ==
Stanley Niaah holds a B.A. in Geography from the University of the West Indies (1991), a diploma in Sociology (1997) and a Ph.D. in Cultural Studies from the University of the West Indies (2004), which made her the first Ph.D. cultural studies graduate from the University of the West Indies. She was also the first to be appointed lecturer, senior lecturer and professor in Cultural Studies, and in 2015, Stanley Niaah was appointed director of the Institute of Caribbean Studies and the Reggae Studies Unit. She is also the inaugural Rhodes Trust Rex Nettleford Fellow in Cultural Studies. Stanley Niaah is the current Director of the Centre for Reparation Research at the UWI.

== Work ==
Stanley Niaah is a Jamaican nationalist and Caribbean regionalist at heart, she is involved in efforts to promote cultural and creative industries, and speaks up for respect for all cultures. She is an advocate for connecting education and music in Jamaica. and has spoken on the actions taken by women to improve their presentation to the public. Her 2010 book on Dancehall was reviewed by multiple venues, including Caribbean Quarterly and Caribbean Studies. More recently, her commentary can be viewed in documentary films or film series such as Samuel L. Jackson's Enslaved and Move (Netflix).

== Selected publications ==
- Stanley Niaah, Sonjah (2010). Dancehall : from slave ship to ghetto. Canadian Electronic Library. Ottawa [Ont.]: University of Ottawa Press. ISBN 978-0-7766-1905-7. OCLC 759157157.
- Stanley Niaah, Sonjah (2008-05-08). "Performance Geographies from Slave Ship to Ghetto". Space and Culture. 11 (4): 343–360. Bibcode:2008SpCul..11..343S. doi:10.1177/1206331207308334. ISSN 1206-3312. S2CID 220749640.
- Stanley-Niaah, Sonjah (2004). "Kingstons's Dancehall". Space and Culture. 7 (1): 102–118. Bibcode:2004SpCul...7..102S. doi:10.1177/1206331203257100. ISSN 1206-3312. S2CID 145093911.
- Hendrickson, Michael; Stanley Niaah, Sonjah (2018-03-26). "A study on the creative industry as a pillar of sustained growth and diversification : the film and music sectors in Jamaica : lessons from case studies of successful firms and ventures".
