= David Jahson =

- Born: Everald Pickersgill; 4 November 1954 (age 71); Kingston, Jamaica
- Died: October 29, 2021
- Genres: Reggae
- Occupation: Singer-songwriter
- Instrument: Vocals
- Years active: Early 1970s-present
- Labels: Top Ranking, Spy, Pick A Skill

Everald Pickersgill (born 4 November 1954), better known as David Jahson, is a Jamaican reggae singer, active since the early 1970s.

== Biography ==
Born in Kingston, Jamaica in 1954, Pickersgill first recorded in 1970 for Clement "Coxsone" Dodd's Studio One, but the results were only released on sound system dub plates. In 1972 he recorded "Far I" for Byron Lee's Dynamic studio, which was released on the Jaguar label, miscredited to 'David Janson' and mis-titled "For I", reaching number seven on the JBC singles chart. Feeling that Dynamic had mishandled the single, his next release was the self-produced "Child of a King", released on the Ital Lion label through Pete Weston's Micron label. In 1975 he recorded his most well-known song, "Natty Chase the Barber", using a new version of John Holt's "Ali Baba" rhythm recorded by a band including his friend Sly Dunbar at Channel One Studios and mixed at King Tubby's. The single was released by Tommy Cowan on his Arab label, miscredited this time to 'David & Jahson'. The song inspired several similarly themed singles by other artists, including Dr Alimantado's "I Killed The Barber", also using the "Ali Baba" rhythm, and Jah Stitch's "Bury The Barber". At the time, he was also working as a deejay with the 'Jah Love Muzik' sound system, and several of Jahson's singles also featured his own deejay versions on the B-side.

Jahson was also a member of the vocal group Well Pleased & Satisfied along with Jerry Baxter. He also played percussion and sang backing vocals with Inner Circle on their tour to support the Everything Is Great album, and members of the band backed him on his Natty Chase the Barber album in 1978, released on the Lewis brothers' Top Ranking label. The album also featured Sly & Robbie and was mixed by Prince Jammy.

In the 1980s he settled in the United Kingdom, continuing to record, and also releasing his old material on his own 'Pick A Skill' label.

== Discography ==
- Natty Chase the Barber (1978), Top Ranking
- Past and Present (1982), Spy
- Come Again (1985), Top Ranking
- Roots of David (1997), Pick A Skill
- Child of the King (2000), Pick A Skill
- In Charge (2007), Pick A Skill
