= Kunitachi College of Music =

Private music conservatory in Tokyo, Japan

Coordinates: 35.73229°N 139.41144°E

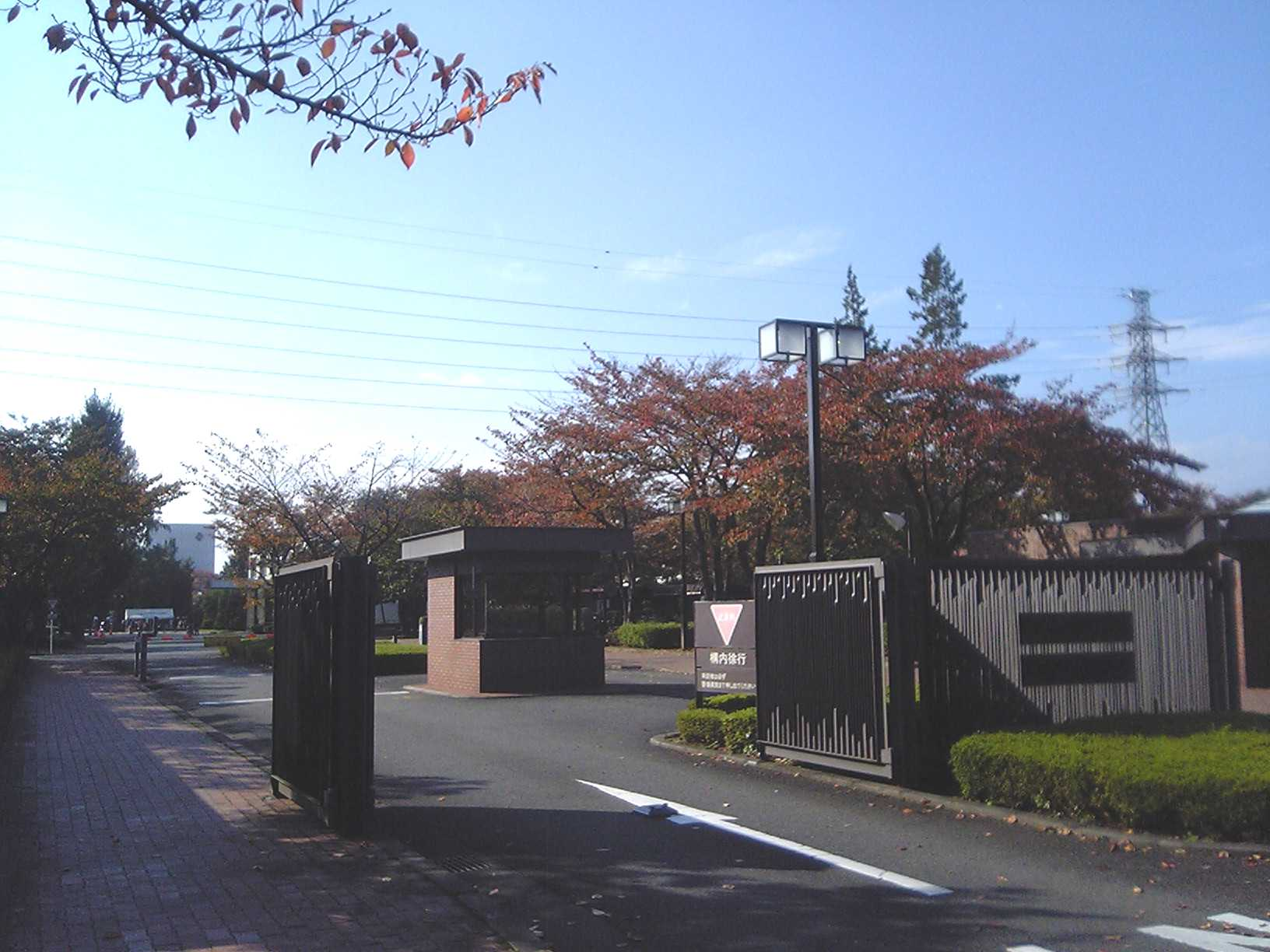
Kunitachi College of Music

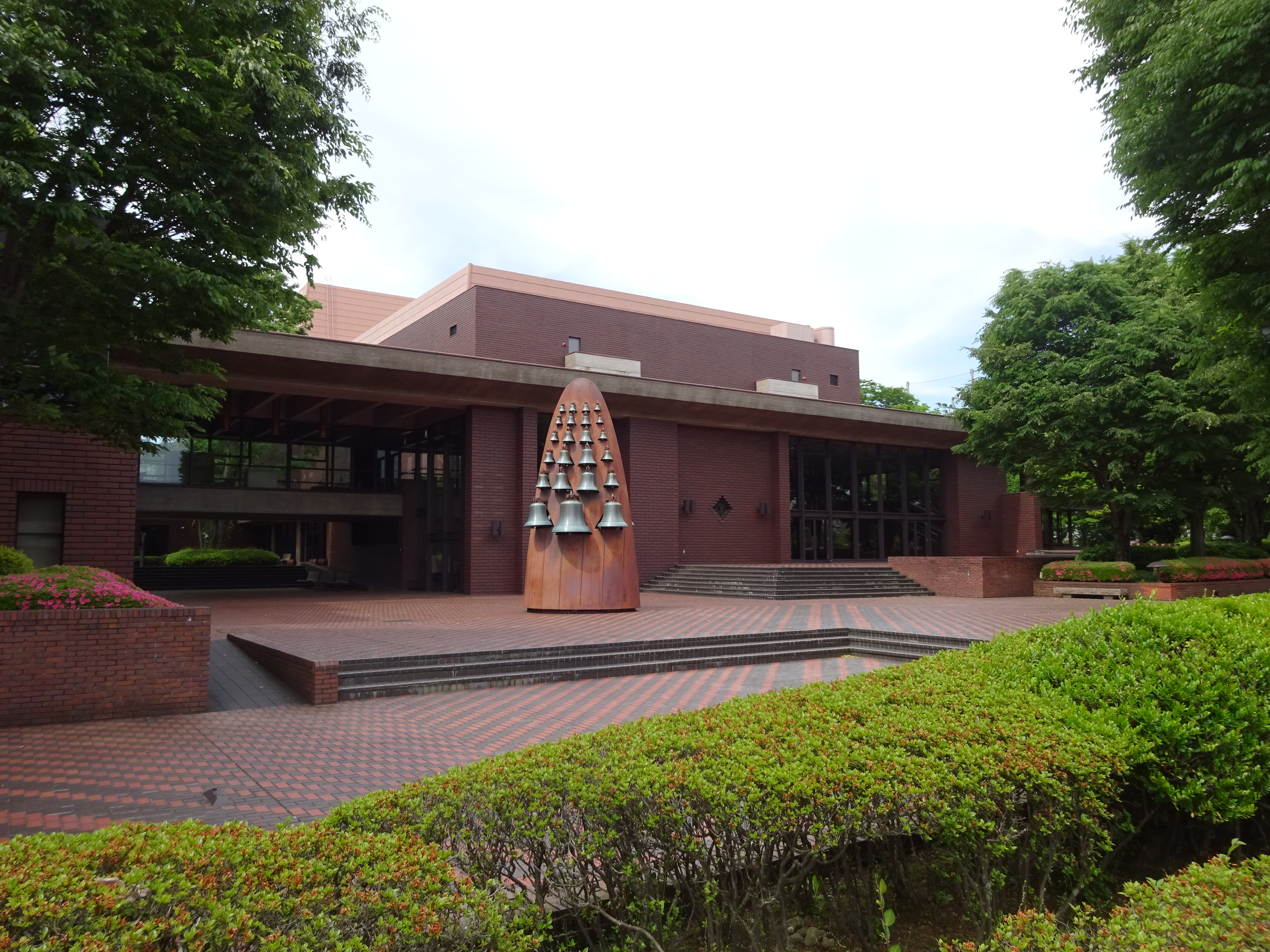
A lecture hall of Kunitachi College of Music

The Kunitachi College of Music (国立音楽大学, Kunitachi Ongaku Daigaku) is a private music conservatory in Tachikawa, Tokyo, Japan. Founded in 1926 as the Tokyo Conservatory of Music, Kunitachi now offers study programs in performance, music education, composition, computer music, and musicology, for bachelor's degree, post-bachelor's diploma, master's degree, and doctorate. It has signed cooperation agreements with notable music schools around the world, such as Geneva University of Music, California Institute of Arts, among others.

== Notable alumni ==
- Masamichi Amano, composer
- Ahn Eak-tai, composer and conductor
- Masashi Fujimoto, actor, singer, musician, and entertainer
- Okuda Hiroko, inventor and composer
- Kohmi Hirose, singer
- Joe Hisaishi, composer and director
- Masato Honda, saxophonist and multi-instrumentalist
- Yukihiro Ikeda, tubist
- Ichiyo Izawa, pianist of Tokyo Jihen; frontman of Appa; dropped out
- Motohiro Kawashima, composer
- Mayumi Miyata, shō player
- Michiru Oshima, composer
- Nozomi Takeuchi, gravure idol
- Yōsuke Yamashita, jazz pianist
- Seiji Yokoyama, composer
- Mimori Yusa, singer-songwriter
- Maiko Iuchi, composer
- Kazumi Totaka, composer and voice actor
- Ooi Takashi, jazz vibraphonist
- Masahiro Sayama, jazz pianist; member of Prism
- Mari Iijima, composer, voice actor, writer, model and singer
- Takatsugu Muramatsu, composer, pianist
- Yaffle, music producer, composer, arranger
