= Casiotone MT-40 =

Electronic keyboard

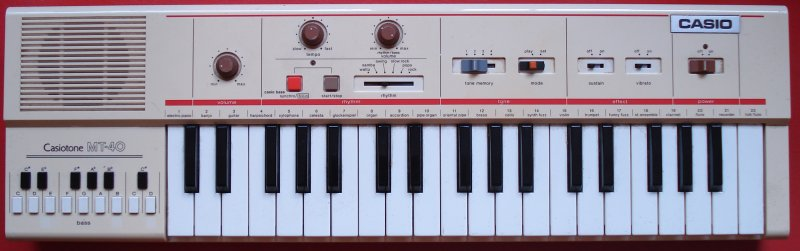
- Manufacturer: Casio
- Dates: 1981—1982
- Price: $150 USD

Technical specifications
- Polyphony: 9

Input/output
- Keyboard: 37
- Left-hand control: Mini keyboard

The Casiotone MT-40 is an electronic keyboard produced by Casio, released in 1981 and retired about a year later. It cost around $150 USD. Its "rock" preset, also known as the Sleng Teng riddim, has been used in hundreds of reggae tracks.

== Sounds and features ==
The MT-40 features 37 keys, 22 instrument sounds and six preset rhythms. It also features a second mini keyboard, which can be used for bass notes or to allow the main keyboard to be played alongside the preset basslines. It is not a synthesiser, as it can only play prerecorded sounds rather than generate them. The presets are limited to a length of two bars and only use drum and bass sounds. The presets were created by the Casio engineer Hiroko Okuda.

== Users ==
The MT-40 was used by the Jamaican reggae musicians Wayne Smith, Noel Davey and King Jammy on the 1985 song "Under Mi Sleng Teng". Davey used a MT-40 as he was unable to afford a Yamaha DX-7 synthesiser, and he and Smith used its "rock" preset to create the backing track. The preset became known as the Sleng Teng riddim (a backing track used in reggae music) and had been used in more than 400 tracks by 2015. It has been widely remixed and used in TV shows, album skits, and video games such as Saints Row IV (2013) and DJ Hero (2009).

The British songwriter Julian Cope used a MT-40 to create the demo for his single "World Shut Your Mouth" (1987). He also used it in a live Peel Session performance and on his 1984 album World Shut Your Mouth. After the success of "Sleng Teng", the MT-40 was used in hip hop tracks such as "Reggae Joint" by 2 Live Crew from the album As Nasty as They Wanna Be (1989). In the UK, it was used in "Way in My Brain" by SL2 and Moby's remix of "Everybody in the Place" (1991) by the Prodigy, and on "Charger" (2017) by Gorillaz.

Engadget compared the MT-40 to the Amen break, a 1969 drum break that began to be widely sampled around the time the MT-40 was rising in popularity. Like the Amen break, the MT-40 was accessible and allowed musicians to create music alone without expensive equipment: "anyone with a microphone, tape machine and a modest keyboard or sampler could make 'pro' riddims". In 2015, Casio released new models, the SA-46 and SA-76, with the "rock" preset renamed "MT40 riddim".
