= Dancehall =

Genre of Jamaican popular music

- Stylistic origins: Reggae; dub; toasting; electronic; ska; rocksteady
- Cultural origins: Late 1970s Jamaica, especially Kingston
- Derivative forms: Reggaeton; dembow; afroswing

Fusion genres
- Reggae fusion; oldschool jungle; tropical house

Regional scenes
- Jamaica; United Kingdom; United States; Canada; Trinidad and Tobago; Antigua and Barbuda; Barbados; St. Kitts and Nevis; Bahamas; Guyana; Grenada; Dominica; Haiti; Belize; Saint Lucia; Saint Vincent and the Grenadines; Suriname; Cayman Islands; Anguilla; Montserrat; Guadeloupe; Martinique; Sint Maarten; Saint Martin; French Guiana; Turks and Caicos Islands; Aruba; Bonaire; Curaçao; Saint Barthélemy; Saba; Sint Eustatius

Dancehall is a genre of Jamaican popular music that originated in the late 1970s. Initially, dancehall was a more sparse version of reggae than the roots style, which had dominated much of the 1970s. This music genre was not officially named until the 1980s, when the two words Dance and Hall (referring to the common venue) were joined to form Dancehall, which was then promoted internationally for the first time. At that time digital instrumentation became more prevalent, changing the sound considerably, with digital dancehall (or "ragga") becoming increasingly characterized by faster rhythms. Key elements of dancehall music include its extensive use of Jamaican Patois rather than Jamaican standard English and a focus on the track instrumentals (or "riddims").

Dancehall saw initial mainstream success in Jamaica in the 1980s; by the 1990s, it became increasingly popular in Jamaican diaspora communities. In the 2000s, dancehall experienced worldwide mainstream. By the 2010s, it began to heavily influence the work of established Western artists and producers, which has helped to further bring the genre into the Western music mainstream.

== History ==
=== Lead ===
Dancehall is named after Jamaican dance halls in which popular Jamaican recordings were played by local sound systems. It both refers to the music and dance style. It faced criticism for negatively influencing Jamaican culture and portraying gangster lifestyles in a praiseworthy way.

=== Early developments - Early 1970s ===
Dancehall music, also called ragga, is a style of Jamaican popular music that had its genesis in the political turbulence of the late 1970s and became Jamaica's dominant music in the 1980s and '90s. It was also originally called Bashment music when Jamaican dancehalls began to gain popularity.

They began in the late 1970s among lower and working-class people from the inner city of Kingston, who were not able to participate in dances uptown. Social and political changes in late-1970s Jamaica, including the change from the socialist government of Michael Manley (People's National Party) to Edward Seaga (Jamaica Labour Party), were reflected in the shift away from the more internationally oriented roots reggae towards a style geared more towards local consumption and in tune with the music that Jamaicans had experienced when sound systems performed live.

Themes of social injustice, repatriation and the Rastafari movement were overtaken by lyrics about dancing, violence and sexuality. Though the revolutionary spirit was present in Jamaica due to this social upheaval, the radio was very conservative and failed to play the people's music. It was this gap that the sound system was able to fill with music that the average Jamaican was more interested in. Alongside this music was the addition of the fashion, art, and dance that came along with it. This made Dancehall both a genre, and a way of life.

In contrast to roots reggae, which aimed for respectability and international recognition, dancehall did not hesitate in dealing with the day-by-day realities and basal interests of the average Jamaican—especially that of lower classes—and observing society in a provocative, gritty, and often vulgar manner. Since this put spreading via radio out of the question, dancehall initially gained popularity only through live performances in sound systems and specialized record dealing.

Dancehall's violent lyrics, which garnered the genre much criticism since its very inception, stem from the political turbulence and gang violence of late 1970s Jamaica.

In the early days of dancehall, the prerecorded rhythm tracks (bass guitar and drums) or "dub" that the deejay would rap or "toast" over came from earlier reggae songs from the 1960s and 1970s. Ragga, specifically, refers to modern dancehall, where a deejay particularly toasts over digital (electrical) rhythms.

=== Origination from the DJ scene ===
Sound systems and the development of other musical technology heavily influenced dancehall music. The music was needed to "get where the radio didn't reach" because Jamaicans often were outside without radios. Yet they eventually found their way into the streets. However, because the audience of dancehall sessions were lower-class people, it was extremely important that they be able to hear music. Sound systems allowed people to listen to music without having to buy a radio. Therefore, the dancehall culture grew as the use of technology and sound systems improved.

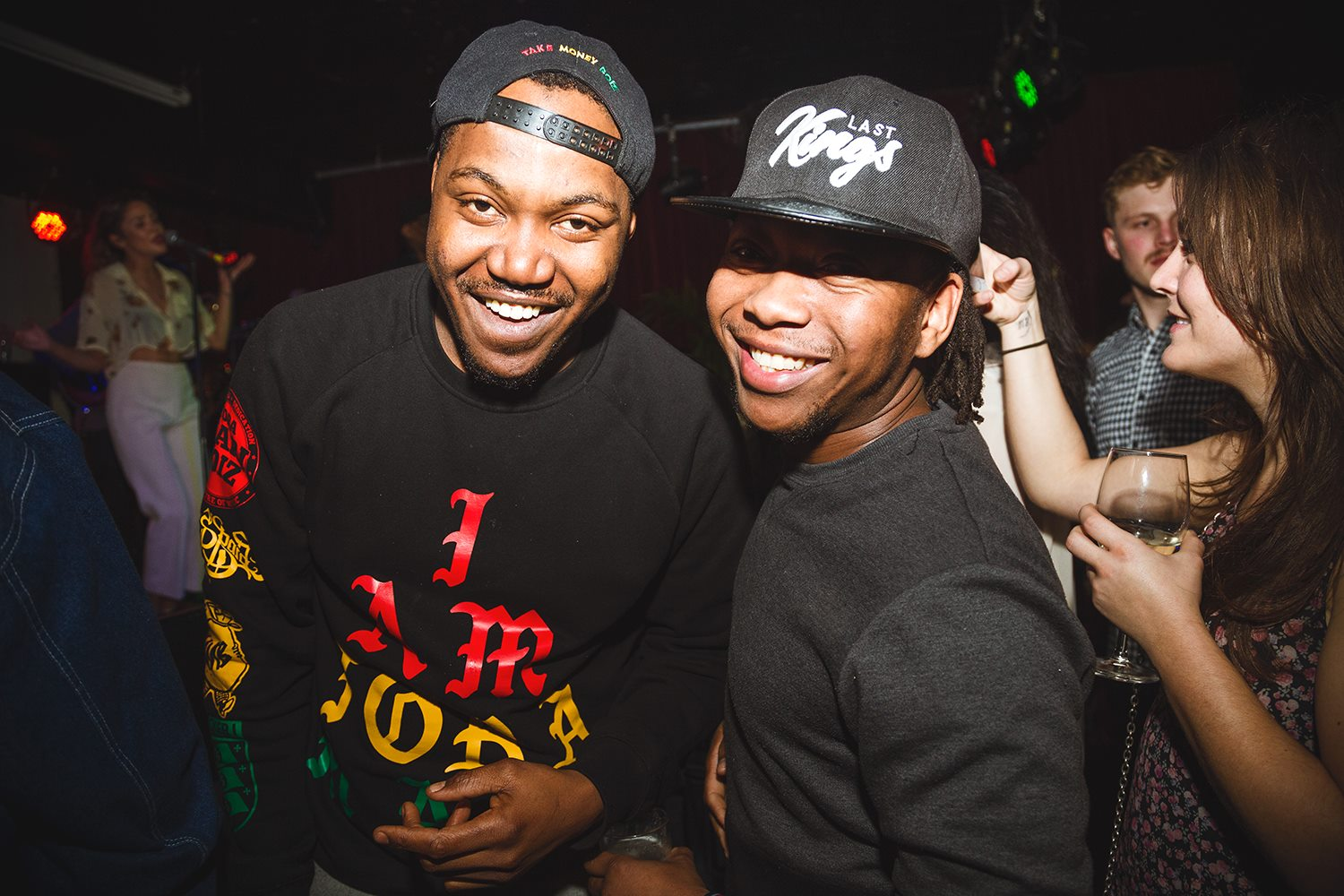
Dizzy Dee & Slicker

The Jamaican dancehall scene developed alongside sound system culture and was shaped by the use of accessible, mobile performance spaces. The term "Dancehall", now commonly associated with a Jamaican music genre, originally referred to the physical venues where DJs and later toasters performed for audiences using sound systems. These venues were often open-air, and the mobility of sound systems allowed performances to take place within inner-city communities, where dancehall events became important social and cultural gatherings.

Krista Thompson's book Shine further expresses the experience of this trendsetting movement and how, particularly, women were able to confront gender ideologies to enact change. The use of video light specifically was a way to express oneself and seek visibility in the social sphere in order to be recognized as citizens in a postcolonial Jamaican society.

In the early development of dancehall, sound systems were an important means through which Jamaican audiences could hear new recordings by popular artists. Over time, sound system operators increasingly became performers in their own right, attracting audiences with their own selections and performances. The high volume and strong low-frequency bass produced by sound systems meant that their vibrations could sometimes be felt before the music itself was clearly heard, while the sound could travel over considerable distances. This contributed to the distinctive role of sound systems in the experience and development of dancehall music.

Jamaica was one of the first cultures to pioneer the concept of remixing. As a result, production level and sound system quality were critical to Jamaica's budding music industry. Since many locals couldn't afford sound systems in their homes, listening to one at a dance party or at a festival was their entry into audible bliss. Stage shows were also an entry for exposing artists to bigger audiences.

Writer Brougtton and Brewster's book Last Night a DJ Saved My Life states that sound systems were a product of Jamaican social lifestyle. The success of music wasn't just in the hands of one person anymore, it was a factor of the DJ, speaking poetic words to the audience, the Selector, harmonizing beats in an aesthetically pleasing way, and the Sound Engineer, wiring the sound systems to handle deeper and louder bass tones. Music became a factor of many elements and the physicality of that sound was a strategic puzzle left for musicians to solve.

=== 1980s–1990s (The Naming) ===
If you read the archives of the Jamaica Gleaner Newspaper you will begin to realize the context written; there was a venue like the lawns where music was played and a style on the rhythms but it was different from what was being "projected" as Reggae and had no name until Michael Tomlinson head of InnerCity Promotion and Lois Grant(Partners at the time) staged an event that changed the culture titled "DanceHall" one word... Before this event Dance And Hall (two words) were used in Jamaican lingo; but it did not represent the music of the culture but rather the venue where music was played. Their promotion company through a series of concerts led to the then emerging music which they labelled, "DanceHall" with the year of its staging, creating a platform for artists to be seen and heard. From 1982 The team started a series called "Saturday Nite Live" at Harbour View Drive-In. Promoting one of Jamaica's finest acts alongside a US soul group. That year '83 it was Gladys Knight & the Pips that headlined the initial concert and the showcase also featured boxing presentations from Muhammad Ali. The tested events were so successful that the next step was to officially launch the name of the series "DanceHall."InnerCity Promotions was responsible for establishing and promoting numerous events which was significant because it marked the beginnings of the music's recognition as the "DanceHall" genre. Mr. Tomlinson triumph is one to share for generations as he opened the door for a new art in a sense to emerge from it beginnings. The journey began with massive opposition received from those who wanted to control the space of entertainment to journalist, radio and TV managers, some who refused to run the commercials or play the music to promote the DanceHall series. The series continued into the early 1990s, the team Michael "Savage" Tomlinson and Lois Grant played an important role in nurturing and promoting the young talents of the inner city and sound system culture. Through their DanceHall live concerts, many performers found a place to use their voice and make a mark due to the opportunities afforded by InnerCity Promotions.[26] This is from the International Reggae Awards special awarded honors(irawma awards).[26]

Sound systems such as Killimanjaro, Black Scorpio, Silver Hawk, Gemini Disco, Virgo Hi-Fi, Volcano Hi-Power and Aces International soon capitalized on the new sound and introduced a new wave of deejays. The older toasters were overtaken by new stars such as Captain Sinbad, Ranking Joe, Clint Eastwood, Lone Ranger, Josey Wales, Charlie Chaplin, General Echo and Yellowman — a change reflected by the 1981 Junjo Lawes-produced album A Whole New Generation of DJs, although many went back to U-Roy for inspiration. He utilized talking over or under a "riddim" which is now known as the deejay's seductive chant, part talking and part singing. Deejay records became, for the first time, more important than records featuring singers. Another trend was sound clash albums, featuring rival deejays or sound systems competing head-to-head for the appreciation of a live audience, with underground sound clash cassettes often documenting the violence that came with such rivalries.

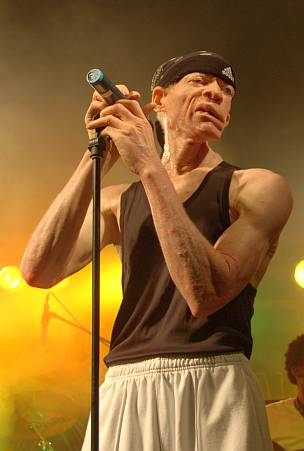
Yellowman backed by Sagittarius Band, Bersenbrueck 2007

Yellowman, one of the most successful early dancehall artists, became the first Jamaican deejay to be signed to a major American record label, and for a time enjoyed a level of popularity in Jamaica to rival Bob Marley's peak. Yellowman often incorporated sexually explicit lyrics into his songs, which became known as "slackness." He did this to address his radical opinions on society through sex and politics due to the failed Jamaican experiment of socialism while under Prime Minister Michael Manley.

The early 1980s also saw the emergence of female deejays in dancehall music, such as Lady G, Lady Saw, and Sister Nancy. Other female dancehall stars include artistes like Diana King and in the late 1990s to the 2000s Ce'cile, Spice, Macka Diamond and more. Beenie Man, Bounty Killer, Mad Cobra, Ninjaman, Buju Banton, and Super Cat becoming major DJs in Jamaica.

With a little help from deejay sound, "sweet sing" (falsetto voice) singers such as Pinchers, Cocoa Tea, Sanchez, Admiral Tibet, Frankie Paul, Half Pint, Courtney Melody, and Barrington Levy were popular in Jamaica.

Nearing the end of the 1980s, Jamaican Dancehall artists gained a lot of appeal through their no-nonsense music. This expanded the genre's reach beyond the Land of Wood and Water's borders. The main appeal of Dancehall was the music, and so it gained a lot of popularity overtime. Back in Jamaica hand-made posters were used not just to pull in would-be attendees to parties and dances. This process of making vibrant and colorful posters soon became an icon of the genre. It had helped in providing visual aesthetic of how Dancehalls had taken up the space and grown in the country.

King Jammy's 1985 hit "(Under Me) Sleng Teng" by Wayne Smith, with an entirely-digital rhythm hook took the dancehall reggae world by storm. Many credit this song as being the first digital rhythm in reggae, featuring a rhythm from a digital keyboard. However, The "Sleng Teng" rhythm was used in over 200 subsequent recordings. This deejay-led, largely synthesized chanting with musical accompaniment departed from traditional conceptions of Jamaican popular musical entertainment.

Dub poet Mutabaruka said, "if 1970s reggae was red, green and gold, then in the next decade it was gold chains". It was far removed from reggae's gentle roots and culture, and there was much debate among purists as to whether it should be considered an extension of reggae.

Shabba Ranks became the first dancehall artist to win at the Grammy Awards with his debut album As Raw as Ever in 1991. His second studio album X-Tra Naked in 1992 earned him back-to-back awards and multiple Billboard chart positions with standout singles like "Ting-A-Ling" and "Mr. Loverman".

This shift in style again saw the emergence of a new generation of artists, such as Sean Paul, Capleton and Beenie Man who became famous ragga stars. A new set of producers also came to prominence: Philip "Fatis" Burrell, Dave "Rude Boy" Kelly, George Phang, Hugh "Redman" James, Donovan Germain, Bobby Digital, Wycliffe "Steely" Johnson and Cleveland "Clevie" Brown (aka Steely & Clevie) rose to challenge Sly & Robbie's position as Jamaica's leading rhythm section.

The faster tempo and simpler electronic beat of late-1980s and early-1990s dancehall greatly influenced the development of Reggae en Español.

=== 2000s ===
By the early 2000s, Dancehall had gained mainstream popularity in Jamaica, as well as in the United States, Canada, Australasia and Western parts of Europe. There was also a big evolution in sound allowing artists to refine and broaden the genre. This was first seen with artists such as Sean Paul with his album Dutty Rock, whose album single "Get Busy" (2003) became the first dancehall single to reach number one on the US Billboard Hot 100.

Unlike earlier Dancehall, this new evolution was characterized by structures of music commonly heard in mainstream pop music, such as repeated choruses, melodic tunes, and hooks. Some lyrics were cleaner and featured less sexual content and profanity.

At this point it was a part of the public consciousness. Cross-genre collaborations soon became normalized, with songs such as Beyonce and Sean Paul's 2003 hit "Baby Boy" and Beenie Man and Mya's 2000 single "Girls Dem Sugar." Alongside this growth many crews were formed by men, women or a mixture of both. These crews created their own dances which developed fame in the Dancehall scene.

Some of the artists who popularized this new era of Dancehall were Bounty Killer, Beenie Man, Elephant Man, Shalkal Carty, Vybz Kartel, Mavado, Mr. Vegas, Wayne Wonder, Ward 21, Lady Saw and Spice, some of whom saw international success. This success brought forward mainstream appeal toward Dancehall which led into the genre's modern era.

=== Modern era: 2010—2019 ===
In 2010, Vybz Kartel became a leading figure in the genre with his larger-than-life persona. His hip-hop-influenced lyricism and fresh cadences shifted a new sound in the Dancehall space. He began working with Jamaican producers such as Rvssian, who released projects like Go-Go Club Riddim & Remedy Riddim. Other producers like Notnice released Street Vybz Riddim & S-Class Riddim. Vybz created a strong allegiance with his then "Portmore Empire". Popcaan, Tommy Lee Sparta, Shawn Storm & Venessa Bling were among many under the production. I-Octane, Charly Black, Aidonia, Dexta Daps & Konshens would also cement their name around this time.

By 2016, Dancehall had re-emerged into global popularity, artists such as Alkaline who became a juggernaut with the release of his debut Album New Level Unlocked in March. The project peaked at No.1 on the Reggae Billboard Charts and stood on the radar for 18 weeks. It broke a five-year hiatus being the only Dancehall album to top the reggae charts sins Shaggy's Summer in Kingston in 2011.

Dancehall saw a new wave of popularity in Western markets in the mid-late 2010s, with immense commercial success being achieved by a number of dancehall-pop singles, including Rihanna's "Work" (2016) and Drake's "One Dance" and "Controlla" (2016). Dancehall also reached the attention of many R&B artists who continued to change and evolve the genre.

A variety of western artists have spoken of being inspired by Dancehall music, including Major Lazer, whose commercially successful singles Lean On (2015), Light It Up (2015) and Run Up (2017) all heavily rely upon dancehall music. Several hip-hop and R&B artists have also released material inspired by dancehall music, including Drake, who has cited Vybz Kartel as one of his "biggest inspirations."

Since 2017, Dancehall artists from Jamaica have been frequently collaborating with UK acts such as Chip, Stefflon Don and J Hus. This is consistent with the increase of urban acts in the UK, and the rebirth of Grime in 2014.

There have also been prominent global collaborations with dancehall artist such as Beyoncé & Shatta Wale's "Already", Davido & Popcaan on "Story", Stefflon Don & French Montana on "Hurtin' Me", and French Montana & Swae Lee on "Unforgettable".

In the late 2010s, a new wave of artists rose to popularity in Jamaica. These artists come from rural parishes, especially Montego Bay, outside of the commercial center of the Jamaican music industry. They are influenced by American trap music and sometimes refer to lottery scamming in their lyrics. Some of the most popular artists in this style are Intence, Chronic Law, Rygin King, and Squash.

=== The streaming era: 2020—present ===
In the 2020s, Dancehall transitioned into the digital world, with platforms like YouTube, Instagram, and TikTok becoming tools for younger artists to develop more exposure for their brands. Skillibeng's single "Whap Whap" ft F.S. became one of those viral songs on social media and streaming platforms, influencing dance challenges and multiple different remixes from hip-hop artists. Nicki Minaj would contribute appreciation to the dancehall culture, Singles like "Crocodile Teeth Remix" (with Skillibeng) and "Likkle Miss Remix" (with Skeng) entered the radar internationally.

The genre began to influence more female artists such as Shenseea, Jada Kingdom, Stalk Ashley, and more.

Byron Messia's single Talibans released in January 2023 peaked at No.99 on the Billboard Hot 100. The song was certified gold by the British Phonographic Industry (BPI) and Music Canada (MC). Riddim's reemerged into full effect in 2023 with Big Bunx Riddim by Zimi Ent and Dutty Money Riddim by Rvssian. This new era of dancehall introduced artists like Skeng, Valiant, Rajahwild, and Kraff Gad.

Skillibeng and Shenseea were both featured on the single "Shake It to the Max (Fly)" by Moliy. The single went TikTok viral following a popular dance challenge, leading to the song becoming an international chart success globally peaking at No.1 on multiple weekly Billboard chart landings and certifying gold in the United Kingdom (BPI), New Zealand (RMNZ), France (SNEP) and Greece (IFPI Greece).

== Musical characteristics ==
Three major elements of Jamaican dancehall music are the use of digital instruments, particularly the Casio Casiotone MT-40 electronic keyboard, the Oberheim DX drum machine, and the use of riddims, instrumentals to which lyrics are added, resulting in an unusual process of creating songs from separate components. More specifically, many riddims are created using digital instruments like the MT-40, a practice that first became popular in 1985 with the release of 'Under Mi Sleng Teng,' whose success made the accessibility of digitally-composed riddims apparent (Manuel-Marshall, p. 453).

=== Riddims ===
A single riddim can be used in multiple songs, paired with different sets of lyrics; the inverse is also possible, with a single set of lyrics being attached to different riddims. Riddims and lyric sets are not exclusive to any one artist, and these can be and are spread around with one particular riddim, 'Real Rock,' first recorded in 1967 for a song of the same name, being used in at least 269 songs by 2006 over the course of 39 years. Peter Manuel and Wayne Marshall noted in 2006 that most songs were set to one of about a dozen riddims that were in vogue, with the exceptions being the work of individual, often high-ranked, artists. Recording over riddims forms the basis of dancehall, with modern dancehall layering vocals over ostinatos; the DJs providing the vocals thus, in the words of Manuel and Marshall, carry the song, unlike older dancehall where vocals were interwoven with full songs.

These practices' roots can be described with the concept of families of resemblance as coined by George Lipsitz in 1986 – similarities between other groups' experiences and cultures (Lipsitz, p. 160). Here, the term might describe the links between different artists via shared riddims and lyric sets and through common experiences incorporated into the music.

== Culture ==
Donna P. Hope defines dancehall culture as a "space for the cultural creation and dissemination of symbols and ideologies that reflect the lived realities of its adherents, particularly those from the inner cities of Jamaica." Dancehall culture actively creates a space for its "affectors" (creators of dancehall culture) and its "affectees" (consumers of dancehall culture) to take control of their own representation, contest conventional relationships of power, and exercise some level of cultural, social and even political autonomy.

Kingsley Stewart outlines ten of the major cultural imperatives or principles that constitute the dancehall worldview. They are:

1. It involves the dynamic interweaving of God and Haile Selassie
2. It acts as a form of stress release or psycho-physiological relief
3. It acts as a medium for economic advancement
4. The quickest way to an object is the preferred way (i.e., the speed imperative)
5. The end justifies the means
6. It strives to make the unseen visible
7. Objects and events that are external to the body are more important than internal processes; what is seen is more important than what is thought (i.e., the pre-eminence of the external)
8. The importance of the external self; the self is consciously publicly constructed and validated
9. The ideal self is shifting, fluid, adaptive, and malleable, and
10. It involves the socioexistential imperative to transcend the normal (i.e., there is an emphasis on not being normal).

Such a drastic change in the popular music of the region generated an equally radical transformation in fashion trends, specifically those of its female faction. In lieu of traditional, modest "rootsy" styles, as dictated by Rastafari-inspired gender roles; women began donning flashy, revealing – sometimes X-rated outfits. This transformation is said to coincide with the influx of slack lyrics within dancehall, which objectified women as apparatuses of pleasure. These women would team up with others to form "modeling posses", or "dancehall model" groups, and informally compete with their rivals.

The emphasis on material display was not limited to women or to clothing. Appearance at dance halls played an important role in peer acceptance and extended beyond dress and jewelry to the vehicles people drove and even the size of their respective gangs or "crews". These displays were significant for both men and women.

One major theme behind dancehall is that of space. Sonjah Stanley Niaah, in her article "Mapping Black Atlantic Performance Geographies", says

Dancehall occupies multiple spatial dimensions (urban, street, police, marginal, gendered, performance, liminal, memorializing, communal), which are revealed through the nature and type of events and venues, and their use and function. Most notable is the way in which dancehall occupies a liminal space between what is celebrated and at the same time denigrated in Jamaica and how it moves from private community to public and commercial enterprise.

In Kingston's Dancehall: A Story of Space and Celebration, she writes:

Dancehall is ultimately a celebration of the disenfranchised selves in postcolonial Jamaica that occupy and creatively sustain that space. Structured by the urban, a space that is limited, limiting, and marginal yet central to communal, even national, identity, dancehall's identity is as contradictory and competitive as it is sacred. Some of Jamaica's significant memories of itself are inscribed in the dancehall space, and therefore dancehall can be seen as a site of collective memory that functions as ritualized memorializing, a memory bank of the old, new, and dynamic bodily movements, spaces, performers, and performance aesthetics of the New World and Jamaica in particular.

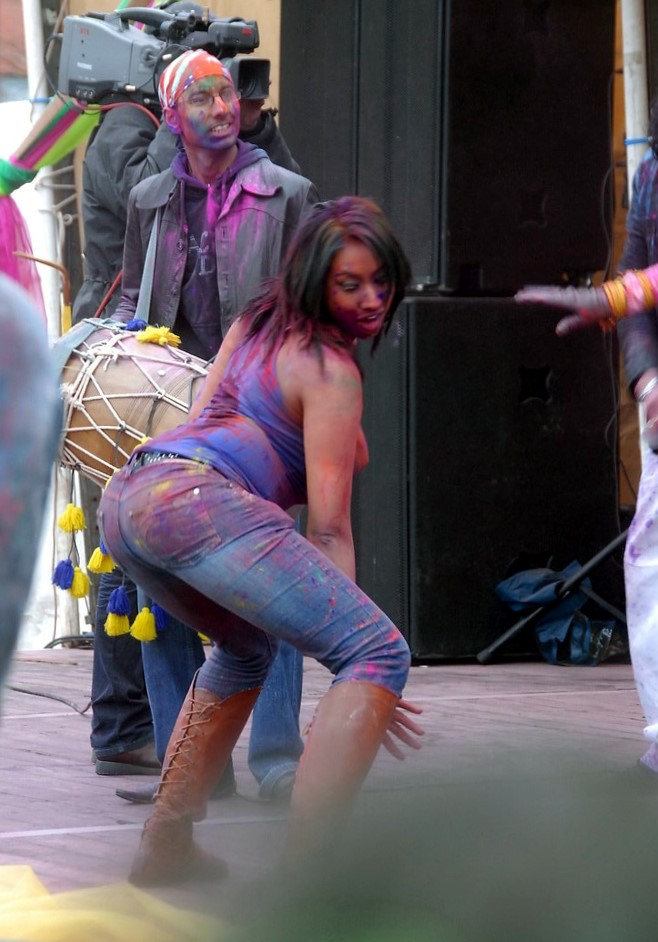
Dancehall-inspired dancing to music

These same notions of dancehall as a cultural space are echoed in Norman Stolzoff's Wake the Town and Tell the People. He notes that dancehall is not merely a sphere of passive consumerism, but rather is an alternative sphere of active cultural production that acts as a means through which black lower-class youth articulate and project a distinct identity in local, national, and global contexts. Through dancehall, ghetto youths attempt to deal with the endemic problems of poverty, racism, and violence, and in this sense the dancehall acts as a communication center, a relay station, a site where black lower-class culture attains its deepest expression. Thus, dancehall in Jamaica is yet another example of the way that the music and dance cultures of the African diaspora have challenged the passive consumerism of mass cultural forms, such as recorded music, by creating a sphere of active cultural production that potentially may transform the prevailing hegemony of society.

In Out and Bad: Toward a Queer Performance Hermeneutic in Jamaican Dancehall Nadia Ellis explicates the culture of combined homophobia and unabashed queerness within Jamaican dancehall culture. She details the particular importance of the phrase "out and bad" to Jamaica when she writes, "This phrase is of queer hermeneutical possibility in Jamaican dancehall because it registers a dialectic between queer and gay that is never resolved, that relays back and forth, producing an uncertainty about sexual identity and behavior that is usefully maintained in the Jamaican popular cultural context." In discussion of the possibility of a self identifying homosexual dancer performing to homophobic music she writes, "In appropriating the culture and working from within its very center, he produces a bodily performance that gains him power. It is the power or mastery, of parody, and of getting away with it."

Ellis not only examines the intersection of queerness and masculinity within the Jamaican dancehall scene, but suggests that the overt homophobia of certain dancehall music actually creates a space for queer expression. In general, homosexuality and queerness are still stigmatized in dancehalls. In fact, some of the songs used during dancehall sessions contain blatant homophobic lyrics. Ellis argues, however, this explicit, violent rhetoric is what creates a space for queer expression in Jamaica. She describes the phenomenon of all male dance groups that have sprung up within the dancehall scene. These crews dress in matching, tight clothing, often paired with makeup and dyed hair, traditional hallmarks of queerness within Jamaican culture. When they perform together, it is the bodily performance that give the homosexual dancers power.

=== Dances ===
The popularity of dancehall has spawned dance moves that help to make parties and stage performances more energetic. Dancing is an integral part of bass culture genres. As people felt the music in the crowded dancehall venues, they would do a variety of dances. Eventually, dancehall artists started to create songs that either invented new dances or formalized some moves done by dancehall goers. Many dance moves seen in hip-hop videos are actually variations of dancehall dances. Examples of such dances are: "Like Glue", "Bogle", "Whine & Dip", "Tek Weh Yuhself", "Whine Up", "Shake It With Shaun" (a mix of various genres), "Boosie Bounce", "Drive By", "Shovel It", "To Di World", "Dutty Wine", "Sweep", "Nuh Behavior", "Nuh Linga", "Skip to My Lou", "Gully Creepa", "Breakdancing" ,"Bad Man Forward Bad Man Pull Up", "Keeping it Jiggy", "Pon Di River", "One Drop", "Whine & Kotch", "Bubbling", "Tic Toc", "Willie Bounce", "Wacky Dip", "Screetchie", "One Vice" and "Daggering".

== Criticisms ==
=== Cultural elements ===
Dancehall combines elements of materialism and stories of hardships of Jamaica. This is seen in the use of gun talk by artists like Buju Banton and Capleton, or the sporting of bling-bling by "Gangsta Ras" artists like Mavado and Munga. The term Gangsta Ras, which combines thuggish imagery with Rastafari is according to Rasta critics, an example of how in dancehall, "the misuse of Rastafari culture has diluted and marginalised the central tenets and creed of the Rastafari philosophy and way of life".

Kingsley Stewart points out that artists sometimes feel an "imperative to transcend the normal", exemplified by artists like Elephant Man and Bounty Killer doing things to stand out, such as putting on a synthetic cartoonish voice or donning pink highlights while constantly re-asserting hypermasculine attributes. Donna P. Hope argues that this trend is related to the rise of market capitalism as a dominant feature of life in Jamaica, coupled with the role of new media and a liberalized media landscape, where images become of increasing importance in the lives of ordinary Jamaicans who strive for celebrity and superstar status on the stages of dancehall and Jamaican popular culture.

Another point of dissension of dancehall from reggae, and from its non-western roots in Jamaica, is on the focus on materialism. Dancehall has also become popular in regions such as Ghana and Panama. Prominent males in the dancehall scene are expected to dress in very expensive casual wear, indicative of European urban styling and high fashion that suggest wealth and status. Since the late 1990s, males in the dancehall culture have rivalled their female counterparts to look fashioned and styled. The female dancehall divas are all scantily clad, or dressed in spandex outfits that accentuate more than cover the shape of the body. In the documentary It's All About Dancing, prominent dancehall artist Beenie Man argues that one could be the best DJ or the smoothest dancer, but if one wears clothing that reflects the economic realities of the majority of the partygoers, one will be ignored, and later Beenie Man returned to perform as Ras Moses.

=== Guns and violent imagery ===
According to Carolyn Cooper in Sound Clash, written in 2004, dancehall music and its following were frequently attacked for frequent references to guns and violence in lyrics, with Cooper responding by arguing that the emergence of firearms was less a sign of genuinely violent undercurrents in dancehall and more a theatrical adoption of the role of guns as tools of power. That ties into the concepts of the badman, a defiant, rebellious figure who often use a gun to maintain a level of respect and fear. Said concepts, Cooper argues, originate in historical resistance to slavery and emulation of imported films, specifically North American action films with gun-wielding protagonists.

Adding to the concept of gunfire as theatrical element is the use of gunfire as a way to show support for a performing DJ or singer, which eventually gave way to flashing cigarette lighters, displaying glowing cellphone monitors, and igniting aerosol sprays. Gunfire as a form of cheering has extended beyond dancehall culture with the phrase "pram, pram!" becoming a general expression of approval or support.

However, Cooper's assessment of the presence of guns in Jamaican dancehall is not wholly uncritical, with a discussion of Buju Banton's 'Mr. Nine' interpreting the song as a denouncement of what Cooper describes as gun culture gone out of control.

Part of the criticism of Jamaican dancehall appears to be the product of cultural clash stemming from a lack of insider knowledge on the nuances of the music's content and the culture surrounding said music. This struggle is something ethnomusicologists struggle with, even within an academic setting, with Bruno Nettl describing in The Study of Ethnomusicology how "insider" and "outsider" viewpoints would reveal different understandings on the same music. Indeed, Nettl later mentions growing questions of who ethnomusicological studies benefited, especially from the groups being studied. And even then, in May It Fill Your Soul, Timothy Rice mentioned that even insider scholars required a level of distanciation to scrutinize their own cultures as needed.

=== Anti-gay lyrics ===
After the popularizing of Buju Banton's dancehall song "Boom Bye Bye" in the early 1990s, dancehall music came under criticism from international organizations and individuals over anti-gay lyrics. In some cases, dancehall artists whose music featured anti-gay lyrics have had their concerts cancelled. Various singers were investigated by international law enforcement agencies such as Scotland Yard, on the grounds that the lyrics incited the audience to assault gay people. For example, Buju Banton's 1993 hit "Boom Bye Bye" advocates the violent assaults and murders of gay people. Another example, T.O.K.'s song "Chi Chi Man," advocates the killing of gay men and women.

Some of the affected singers believed that legal or commercial sanctions were an attack against freedom of speech, often blaming racism, claiming that the response to their lyrics resulted from anti-black attitudes in the international music industry. However, many artists have over time apologized for their mistreatment of LGBTQ+ communities, particularly in Jamaica, and agreed to not use anti-gay lyrics nor continue to perform or profit off their previously anti-gay music. "Stop Murder Music" is/was a movement against homophobia in dancehall music. This movement actively targeted homophobia in dancehall music and was partially initiated by a controversial UK based group OutRage! and supported by the Black Gay Men's Advisory Group (UK based) and J-Flag (Jamaica based). It led to some dancehall artists signing the Reggae Compassionate Act. Dancehall artist Mista Majah P has created dancehall music more recently that celebrates and advocates for LGBTQ+ people.

Some artists agreed not to use anti-gay lyrics during their concerts in certain countries internationally because their concerts kept being protested and cancelled. However, some commentators claim this fails to address the most serious effects of the anti-gay lyrics in dancehall music, which are on the LGBTQ+ people of Jamaica, where this music is most present.

The progressive cultural critic Tavia Nyong'o argues that the criticism of homophobia in dancehall is simply an anti-black association of homophobia with blackness. At the same time, however, he argues that such criticism is still important to black communities, and that the international community acts as though it is not. To N'yongo, this represents an anti-black and anti-gay attitude that works to "erase" intersectional black LGBTQ+ identities.

Mista Majah P has claimed that artists who have never used anti-gay lyrics, and even write music advocating for gay rights, are often excluded from certain spaces due to the association between the genre and homophobia.

Dancehall music has had a significant and complex impact on many LGBTQ+ black people, particularly with connections to Jamaica, both in terms of cultural importance and at times deeply violent lyrics. This is demonstrated in the film "Out and Bad: London's LGBT Dancehall Scene" which discusses the experience of a group of LGBTQ+ black, and mostly Jamaican, people in London. Dancehall is important to their culture, both in connection with Jamaican heritage and in how social interactions are constructed around dance and music. However, the film discusses how many dancehall songs contain blatantly homophobic and transphobic lyrics. One interviewee comments, "we still enjoy ourselves to these kinds of music because [what matters to us is] the rhythm of the music, the beat, the way the music makes us feel."

Scholars have theorized around the significance and meaning around the use of anti-gay lyrics in dancehall music. Donna P. Hope argues that dancehall culture's anti-gay lyrics formed part of a macho discussion that advanced the interest of the heterosexual male in Jamaica, which is a Christian society with strong Rastafari movement influence as well. Dancehall culture in Jamaica often included imagery of men dressing and dancing in a way stereotypically associated with gay-male style. However, the cultural, religious, and social gender-norms continued to advance the ideal man as macho and heterosexual, any divergence from this would be identified as inadequate and impure portraits of true masculinity.

Some authors have suggested that this duality, the presentation of "queerness," in dance style and dress, and the violent homophobia, in dancehall spaces can be explained by the ritualistic "doing away with 'homosexuality'." Scholar Nadia Ellis suggests that when songs with homophobic lyrics are played, the environment of dancehall spaces can become serious and individuals can use the opportunity to reinstate their allegiance to heteronormativity. These songs thus act to "consecrate" the spaces as straight and masculine. In the safety this ritualized hetero-normativity creates, the space may be opened to more free expression and participants can then more openly engage with styles and dancing that might have been seen as queer. Ellis writes: "The songs are played; no one is 'gay'; everyone can turn a blind eye."

The backlash to Banton's violently anti-gay "Boom Bye-Bye", and the reality of Kingston's violence which saw the deaths of deejays Pan Head and Dirtsman saw another shift, this time back towards Rastafari and cultural themes, with several of the hardcore slack ragga artists finding religion, and the "conscious ragga" scene becoming an increasingly popular movement. A new generation of singers and deejays emerged that harked back to the roots reggae era, notably Garnett Silk, Tony Rebel, Sanchez, Luciano, Anthony B and Sizzla. Some popular deejays, most prominently Buju Banton and Capleton, began to cite Rastafari and turn their lyrics and music in a more conscious, rootsy direction. Many modern dancehall Rasta artists identify with Bobo Ashanti.

== Women's message of power and control ==
Dancehalls are used to communicate messages of women's power and control in a protest against their gendered experience embedded in Jamaican culture. Danger, a dancehall queen and the winner of the International Dancehall Queen Competition in 2014, expresses her power through dancehalls as she explains: "We are queens, we are not afraid to go out there to do what we want to, demand what we want, and to live how we want, and represent women all over the world and to let them know it is okay to be yourself and that it is ok to not hold back" Raquel, also known as Dancing Princess, describes her ability to communicate through the dancehall: "What you've lived, what you feel, put it in the dance. That's what dance is, expressing with your body what you feel and who you are. (...) dancehall is the way of the woman to say no, I am a woman respect me." As evidenced by these women, dancehall is a space that allows for women to be empowered and to communicate their liberation from the boundaries imposed on them. Rather by negotiating their own boundaries in the dancehall, by taking control of their bodies, and by communicating their power, they are demanding respect when confronted by those who do not believe they deserve it.
