= Under Mi Sleng Teng =

1985 song by Wayne Smith

Single by Wayne Smith

from the album Sleng Teng
- Released: 1985
- Genre: Reggae, dancehall
- Length: 4:06
- Label: Jammy's / Greensleeves
- Songwriters: Ian "Wayne" Smith, Noel Davey, Lloyd "King Jammy" James
- Producer: Prince Jammy

Wayne Smith singles chronology
"Borrow Borrow" (1984)	"Under Mi Sleng Teng" (1985)	"Come Along" (1985)

"Under Mi Sleng Teng" is a song by the Jamaican reggae singer Wayne Smith, released in 1985 on Jammy's Records. Smith and Noel Davey wrote it using a preset on the Casiotone MT-40 keyboard and completed it with the producer King Jammy. It was one of Jamaica's first digital music productions and is credited as a milestone in the history of Jamaican popular music, taking reggae closer to American hip hop production methods.

Soon after the release, numerous artists recorded songs using the same riddim (reggae backing track), which became known as the Sleng Teng riddim. It is likely the most recorded riddim in dancehall reggae, having been used in more than 500 songs. It has also been used in hip-hop, rock and electronica and in television shows and video games, and has been widely remixed.

== Production ==
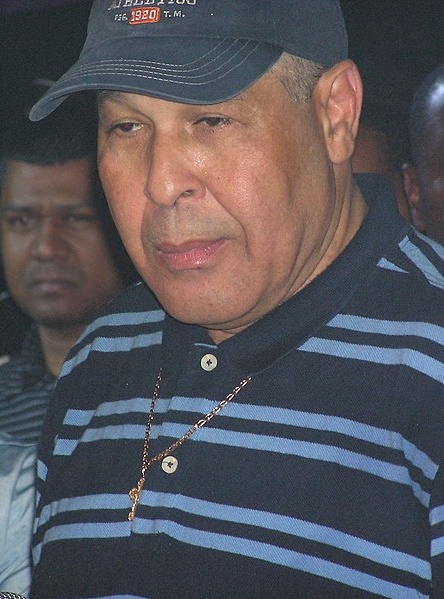
The producer, King Jammy, in 2007

In 1981, the reggae vocalist Wayne Smith, aged 14, began recording with the producer King Jammy in Kingston, Jamaica. They recorded two albums without commercial success. In 1984, Smith met Noel Davey and created a riddim (reggae backing track) using the "rock" preset on Davey's Casiotone MT-40 keyboard. Davey used an MT-40 as he was unable to afford a Yamaha DX-7 synthesiser. He and Smith triggered the preset by mistake and initially struggled to recreate it. Davey added chords, and Smith improvised lyrics.

Davey and Smith presented the track to various reggae producers, who dismissed its electronic sound. That December, they presented it to Jammy, who slowed the tempo to better suit reggae and had Smith rerecord his vocals. The group overdubbed piano, percussion and a Pollard Syndrum, an electronic drum. Jammy's associates, unused to the electronic production style, were critical. Smith was so upset that he left the studio to hide his tears.

== Lyrics ==
In Jamaican patois, "sleng teng" refers to a cannabis cigarette and a slim attractive woman. Smith's lyrics describe his love of marijuana and disapproval of cocaine. At the time, Smith's neighbourhood of Waterhouse, Kingston, was rife with cocaine and crack cocaine. Smith was inspired by the 1983 Barrington Levy song "Under Mi Sensi", which describes an arrest for possession of ganja.

== Release ==
According to Smith, Jammy hesitated to release "Under Mi Sleng Teng", but Smith convinced him he had nothing to lose. According to some reports, the week it was recorded, Jammy played it at a sound clash against the rival sound system Black Scorpio, where it was popular with the audience. However, an investigation by The Quietus suggested it was instead debuted at a dance in Kingston hosted by Jammy.

"Under Mi Sleng Teng" was released as a seven-inch single on Jammy's record label Jammy's Records. It entered the UK singles chart in February 1986. In 2025, the 40th anniversary of its release, "Under Mi Sleng Teng" was reissued on seven-inch vinyl by the independent reggae label VP Records and Greensleeves.

== Legacy ==
"Under Mi Sleng Teng" was one of Jamaica's first digital music productions. Previously, reggae songs were typically initiated by a singer presenting lyrics and a melody to a producer, who would use session players to create an arrangement. After "Under Mi Sleng Teng", most riddims were created electronically by keyboard players alone, "resulting in a tougher, more durable sound geared towards Jamaica's sound systems", according to The Guardian.

The new style was initially referred to as "digital reggae". It initially confused international listeners, but according to The Guardian it "made perfect sense" in Jamaica. Afterwards, reggae producers such as Sly and Robbie, Steely & Clevie and Mafia & Fluxy began using electronic instruments to create riddims. In 2025, Rodigan said it had revolutionised music production, likening it to the rise of artificial intelligence in music. Jammy said it "computerised the reggae business". The riddim moved reggae closer to American hip-hop production methods.

The Guardian described "Under Mi Sleng Teng" as a milestone in the history of Jamaican popular music, writing that it "kick-started a new genre and changed the island's culture almost overnight" and "catalysed an exchange of ideas that would soon spread even further afield". In 2011, The Guardian named the release of "Under Mi Sleng Teng" one of the 50 key events in the history of world and folk music. That year, Rolling Stone named "Under Mi Sleng Teng" the ninth-greatest "stoner anthem", saying its "deliciously stupefying preset ... creates a near-instant contact high". In 2015, Pitchfork named it the 184th-greatest song of the 1980s.

=== Sleng Teng riddim ===
According to Jammy, soon after "Under Mi Sleng Teng" was first played, he was inundated with requests from artists who wanted to use the riddim. He recorded songs with singers including Johnny Osbourne, Tenor Saw and Sugar Minott. Within months, hundreds of tracks using the riddim had been released. In February 1985, the British DJ David Rodigan and the Jamaican DJ Barrington "Barry G" Gordon competed in a sound clash in Montego Bay, Jamaica, in which they played several tracks based on the Sleng Teng riddim. The clash was broadcast by the Jamaica Broadcasting Corporation and the London radio station Capital Radio and helped popularise the riddim internationally.

The Quietus described Osbourne's "Buddy Bye" as among the most iconic of the first generation of Sleng Teng uses. Davey assisted Anthony Red Rose in recording "Under Mi Fat Ting". The UK record label Fashion Records recorded a version using a LinnDrum drum machine, with vocals by Smiley Culture. Tippa Irie released "Sleng Teng Finish Already", which expressed his exhaustion with the riddim. The riddim was used by the British duo Dr Calculus on their 1986 single "Perfume from Spain". In 2005, Jammy's Records released a compilation of songs that use the Sleng Teng riddim, 1985 Master Hits —Sleng Teng Extravaganza.

The Sleng Teng riddim is likely the most recorded riddim in dancehall reggae. According to Riddim-ID, a website that tracks the use of riddims, it has been used in more than 500 songs. It has also been in other genres, by acts including the hip hop groups 2 Live Crew, Snoop Dogg and 50 Cent, the rock band Sublime and the electronic group the Prodigy. The 1991 SL2 song "Way in My Brain", which samples "Under Mi Sleng Teng", was used in a 2021 ad campaign by the technology company Meta. The riddim has been widely remixed and used in TV shows, album skits and video games such as DJ Hero (2009) and Saints Row IV (2013). It was referenced by the American electronic duo Discovery in "Slang Tang" from their 2009 album LP, and by the Swedish singer Robyn in her 2010 song "Dancehall Queen".

The scholars Peter Manuel and Wayne Marshall argued that the Sleng Teng riddim was seminal for its fresh sound; its promotion of digital production methods, whereby electronic instruments could be used to create riddims without musicians or studios; and for its consolidation of the trend to create riddims based on short ostinatos.

=== MT-40 preset ===
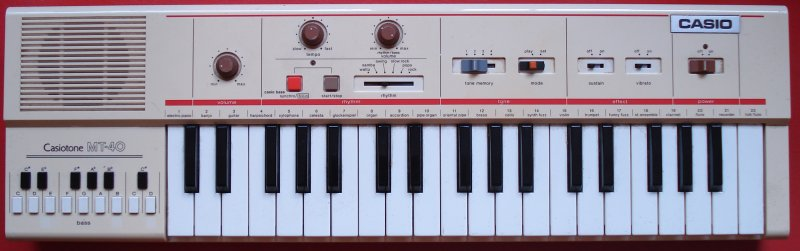
The Sleng Teng riddim originates in a preset created by Hiroko Okuda on the Casiotone MT-40 keyboard, released in 1981.

The riddim originates as a Casiotone MT-40 keyboard preset created by the engineer Hiroko Okuda. Okuda had studied at the Kunitachi College of Music and wrote her thesis on reggae. Creating presets was her first role after joining Casio in 1980.

Though the preset was labelled "rock", Okuda said: "In those days, my head was full of reggae ... I think it just naturally came out as something that would work in reggae as well." Okuda said she did not have reggae in mind when she wrote the bassline, but wanted to create a sound that would be easy to toast over. She kept the bassline simple to suit offbeat chords of reggae and to allow musicians to develop arrangements.

Okuda denied that the preset was modelled on "Somethin' Else" (1959) by Eddie Cochran or "Anarchy in the UK" (1976) by the Sex Pistols, and said it was based on a 1970s British rock record she refused to identify, triggering speculation. The Quietus suggested "Hang On to Yourself" (1972) by David Bowie as the influence. Okuda said the bassline was not based on any song.

Okuda discovered that the preset had inspired multiple songs while reading a music magazine in 1986. She credited the phenomenon to the fact that Casio was focused on exports and had been willing to give a new employee the task of creating the presets, and said the event did not get much attention inside Casio. Casio did not sue for copyright infringement as they believed it was more important for musicians to use their instruments and to build a reputation as instrument makers. When responding to requests for permission to use the preset, Casio only asks that the musician credits the source. Okuda said: "If I can give back even a little bit of what reggae has given me over the years, nothing could make me happier."
