= Riddim =

Rhythmic accompaniment in Jamaican music

In Jamaican dancehall music, a riddim is the instrumental accompaniment to a song and is synonymous with the rhythm section and of a song's "groove" in its bass and low drum parts. Jamaican music genres that use the term consist of the riddim plus the voicing (vocal part) sung by the deejay. A given riddim, if popular, may be used in dozens—or even hundreds—of songs, not only in recordings but also in live performances.

Since the 1970s, riddims have accompanied reggae music and through the 1980s, more widely known as dancehall. As seen in dancehall music, there is a voicing part—sung by the deejay—over a riddim that has likely been widely used in many other songs. There is a unique establishment in the combination of riddims and voicing.

By 1993, Jamaica finally established a copyright act, but producers still face difficulty in establishing profit. Through proper registration, many artists now work on negotiating their royalties and taking it more seriously. The unique nature of dancehall and riddims have been highly influential on the numerous remixes that now circulate throughout R&B and hip-hop music.

== Definition ==
Some classic riddims, such as "Nanny Goat" and "Real Rock", both produced by Clement "Coxsone" Dodd, are essentially the accompaniment tracks of the original 1960s reggae songs with those names. Since the 1980s, however, riddims started to be originally composed by producers/beatmakers, who give the riddims original names and, typically, contract artists to voice over them. Thus, for example, "Diwali" is the name not of a song, but of a riddim created by Steven "Lenky" Marsden, subsequently used as the basis for several songs, such as Sean Paul's "Get Busy" and Bounty Killer's "Sufferer".

Riddims are the primary musical building blocks of Jamaican popular songs. At any given time, ten to fifteen riddims are widely used in dancehall recordings, but only two or three of these are the now ting (i.e., the latest riddims that everyone must record over if they want to get them played in the dance or on radio). In dancehall performing, those whose timing is right on top of the rhythm are said to be "riding di riddim".

== Bass culture ==
The bass culture of Jamaican sonic sensibilities is characterized with less emphasis on melody and large emphasis on the drum beats and low frequency bass vibrations to draw attention to the social grounding to the culture. These aspects of Jamaican music are expressed visually through the Dancehall choreography and its African inspired folk traditions, which emphasize earthly connection through flat-footed stamping and "bumper-grinding sexually explicit choreography, where the bass note is struck by the body itself—displaying its fecundity and celebrating its fertility". This bass culture is also embodied sonically by the music's heartbeat, the bass lines often described as riddims, produced in the late 1960s and early 1970s. These riddims offer a sonic foundation on top of which different other sounds are incorporated to form innumerable versions.

== Usage ==
Riddims are the instrumental background (the rhythm section) of reggae, lovers rock, dub, ragga, dancehall, soca, bouyon, sega and also reggaeton, which itself is largely based on the "Dem Bow" / "Fish Market" riddims by Steely & Clevie, the "Fever Pitch" riddim by Bunny Lie Lie and E. Sharman and "Pounder (Dub Mix II)" by Dennis the Menace from the early 1990s.

In other musical contexts, a riddim would be called a groove or beat. In most cases, the term riddim is used in reference to the entire background track or rhythm section, but in older roots riddims, riddim is used to reference a certain bass line and drum pattern. Often a melody is associated with the riddim, and occasionally an artist will produce two different songs with the same riddim (e.g. Elephant Man's "Ele Melody" and "Father Elephant" were both produced using the Kopa riddim, produced by Supa Dups). Riddims began forming popular in the early 1960s with the evolving role of the DJ. The work of DJs became less of shouting throughout points during a song, but more focused on an aesthetic with the voicings over these instrumental riddims. A specific DJ, DJ U-Roy, revolutionized the practice with studio recordings of these DJ voicings as his recordings skyrocketed on the charts in Jamaica in the '70s, thus leading to the beginning stages of dancehall. Riddims, therefore, became the standard practice for dancehall as it has progressed. Today, the same practices combining riddim and voicing still takes precedence in dancehall. Other live performances like at clubs or along the streets feature the use of sound systems in which there are usually medleys of different songs that all use the instrumental accompaniment.

While a staple of mainly reggae-based music, an emerging electronic music genre as a sub-genre of dubstep, also called riddim, has recently emerged.

== Types ==
African in origin (see clave (rhythm) and bell pattern), riddims can generally be categorized into three types. One of the oldest types of riddim is the classical riddim providing roots reggae, dub, and lovers rock with instrumentals, such as "Bam Bam" produced by Sly & Robbie. The second type is the ragga riddim backing raggamuffin and dancehall songs, such as the "Juice" riddim, produced by Richard "Shams" Browne. The third type is the digital riddim, such as "Sleng Teng", "Punaany Riddim" and "Duck Riddim" produced by King Jammy.

A number of riddims take their name and influence from African-Jamaican religious drumming such as the "Kumina" riddim, created in 2002 by Sly and Robbie, and Burru.

== Producers ==
Different producers often develop their own versions of the same riddim, such as the "Punanny" riddim, which has distinct versions crafted by Steely & Clevie and by Ward 21; the "Buzz Riddim", which was produced by Troyton Rami and Roger Mackenzie and officially launched dancehall deejay Sean Paul into superstardom ("Gimme the Light" from Buzz Riddim won him his first Grammy for Best Reggae Album). Different artists often perform on top of the same riddims with different lyrics and different vocal styles, ranging from singing to toasting. As an example, Beenie Man's song "My Wish", Mr. Vegas' song "Go Up", and T.O.K.'s "Man ah Bad Man" are all based on the "Juice" riddim. Many riddims are named after the song that was recorded on that instrumental track for the first time (or, in some cases, the song that becomes the most popular on a given riddim). For example, the "Satta Massagana" riddim is named after the Abyssinians' original song "Satta Massagana".

== See also ==
- Music of Jamaica
- Sampling
