= King Jammy =

Jamaican record producer (born 1947)

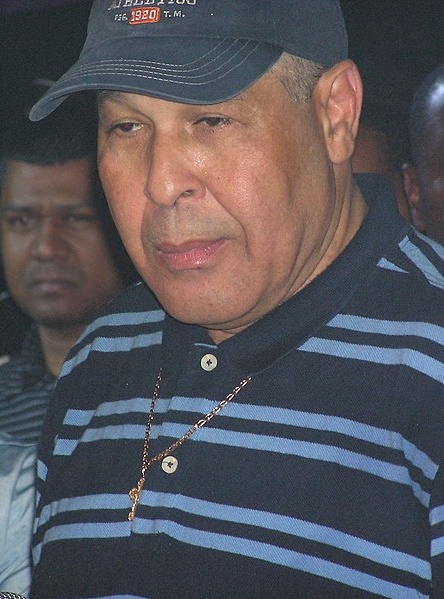
- King Jammy in 2007

Background information
- Born: Lloyd Woodrowe James; 26 October 1947 (age 78); Montego Bay, St. James, Colony of Jamaica
- Genres: Reggae; dub; dancehall; ragga
- Occupation: Record producer
- Labels: VP; Greensleeves; King Jammy's

Lloyd Woodrowe James (born 26 October 1947), better known as Prince Jammy or King Jammy, is a Jamaican dub mixer, sound system owner and record producer. He began his musical career as a dub master at King Tubby's recording studio. His dubs are known for their clear sound and use of effects.

== Biography ==
After earning money from building amplifiers and repairing electrical equipment from his mother's house in Waterhouse in the late 1960s, he started his own sound system. He also built equipment for other local systems. After leaving Jamaica to work in Canada for a few years in the early 1970s, he returned to Kingston in 1976 and set up his own studio at his in-laws' home in Waterhouse, and released a couple of Yabby You productions. When Philip Smart left King Tubby's team to work in New York City, Jammy replaced him, getting to work with Bunny Lee and Yabby You.

In the late 1970s, he began to release his own productions, including the debut album from Black Uhuru in 1977. In the 1980s, he became one of the most influential producers of dancehall music. His biggest hit was 1985's "Under Me Sleng Teng" by Wayne Smith, with an entirely digital rhythm hook. Many credit this song as being the first "digital riddim" in reggae, leading to the modern dancehall era. Later into 1980s, Jammy improvised reggae and dancehall: he digitalized old riddims, like Real Rock, and Far East. King Jammy then began working with top artists in Jamaica throughout the 1980s and 1990s such as Admiral Bailey, Admiral Tibet, Chaka Demus, Frankie Paul, Lieutenant Stitchie, Pinchers, and Dennis Brown. Jammy's productions and sound system dominated reggae music for the remainder of the 1980s and into the 1990s. He continues to work as a producer, working with some of today's top Jamaican artists, including Sizzla.

== Partial discography ==
=== Solo records or records with co-billing ===
Year	Album title	Artists	Label
1975	Prince Jammy vs King Tubbys – His Majestys Dub	Prince Jammy, King Tubby	Original Music, Carell Music, Sky Juice
1977	Prince Jammy in Lion Dub Style	Prince Jammy	VP
1979	Crucial Bunny vs Prince Jammy – Fatman Dub Contest	Crucial Bunny, Prince Jammy	Auralux UK
1979	Kamikazi Dub	Prince Jammy	VP, Trojan
1979	Harder Na Rass	The Rasses Band, Prince Jammy	Warrior UK
1980	Fatman vs. Jah Shaka in a Dub Conference	Prince Jammy, Barry Brown, Johnny Osbourne	Third World Recording Co. Ltd.
1980	Big Showdown	Scientist v. Prince Jammy	Greensleeves
1981	First, Second And Third Generation of Dub	King Tubby, Prince Jammy, Scientist	KG Imperial
1981	Strictly Dub	Prince Jammy	Pressure Sound, Arawak
1982	Black Uhuru in Dub	Black Uhuru, Prince Jammy	VP, Wesgram, CSA
1982	Prince Jammy Destroys The Invaders	Prince Jammy	Greensleeves
1982	Dub Landing Vol: 2	Scientist, Prince Jammy	Greensleeves, Starlight
1983	Dub Culture	Prince Jammy	Dressed To Kill
1983	Osbourne in Dub	Prince Jammy	VP, Charly
1983	Scientist & Jammy Strike Back	Scientist, Prince Jammy	Trojan, Music On Vinyl, Real Gone Music, Charly
1986	Computerised Dub	Prince Jammy	Greensleeves
2011	Crucial in Dub	Prince Jammy	Greensleeves/VP
2015	Alborosie Meets King Jammy – Dub of Thrones	Alborosie, King Jammy	Greensleeves/VP
2015	Jammy's Dub Encounter	King Jammy, Keith Hudson	VP
2016	Rasta State	King Jammy, Mykal Rose	VP
2016	King Jammy Presents: New Sounds of Freedom	King Jammy, Black Uhuru	VP
2017	Waterhouse Dub	King Jammy	VP
2018	King Jammy Presents Dennis Brown: Tracks of Life	Dennis Brown, King Jammy	VP
2022	King Jammy Destroys the Virus with Dub	King Jammy	VP
2023	Rebirth of the Cool Ruler	Gregory Isaacs, King Jammy	VP

=== Compilations ===
- Dub Gone 2 Crazy (King Tubby & Prince Jammy – 1975–79) Blood and Fire (record label)
- Dub The Old Fashioned Way (Lee Perry & Prince Jammy – 1998)
- Dubwise Revolution (King Tubby & Prince Jammy & Scientist – 2000)
- The Rhythm King (Prince Jammy & Various Artists – 2003)
- Umoja – 20th Century DEBwise (Dennis Brown Presents Prince Jammy – 1978)

==== Appearances on various artist compilations ====
- Big Showdown

1. Round 2
2. Round 4
3. Round 6
4. Round 8
5. Round 10

- Black Black Minds

1. Peace And Rest Version
2. How Long Version
3. Keep On Trying Version

- Bunny Lee Meets King Tubby & Aggrovators

1. Channel One A Boy

- Creation Rockers

1. You're No Good

- Don Letts Presents The Mighty Trojan Sound

1. Out Of Order

- Dub Chill Out

1. Slow Motion Dub
2. Black And White Dub
3. Dub It in the Dancehall Dub
4. Jump Song Dub

- Dub Massive Chapter 1

1. Out Of Order
2. Fist Of Fury

- Dub Massive Chapter 2

1. Throne Of Blood
2. Shaolin Temple

- Dub Sessions

1. Dub Investigation
2. Brothers of the Blade

- Dubwise & Otherwise

1. Wreck Up A Version

- Fat Man Dub Contest

1. Jammy A No Fool
2. Jammy's on the Move
3. Jammy's A Shine
4. Jammy's A Satta

- Fatman Presents Twin Spin Vol I

1. Second Generation

- First, Second And Third Generation Of Dub

1. Second Generation
2. On The Scene

- Flashing Echo

1. Fist Of Fury
2. Jammin For Survival
3. Out Of Order Dub

- Haul & Pull Up Selecta

1. You're No Good (12")
2. Jammin' For Survival (12")

- Heavyweight Sound

1. Problems Dub

- In Fine Style

1. A Useful Version

- King Jammy in Roots

1. Slaughterhouse Five
2. Born Free (Extended Mix)
3. Youth Man Dub

- Kung Fu !

1. Shaolin Temple
2. Throne Of Blood
3. Fist Of Fury

- Punky Reggae Party
- Run It Red

1. Chapter Of Money
2. Dub Ites Green & Gold
3. Higher Ranking
4. A Stalawatt Version
5. Mr. Bassie Dub
6. Music Dub

- Scratchy Sounds

1. Brothers of the Blade

- Straight To I Roy Head

1. Channel One A Boy

- The Crowning Of Prince Jammy

1. Life Is A Moment in Space
2. The Crowning Of Prince Jammy
3. Return Of Jammy's Hi-Fi

- The Rough Guide to Dub

1. Chapter of Money

- The Trojan Story Vol 1&2

1. Throne of Blood

- Third World Disco Vol 1

1. Love Can Conquer

- This Is Crucial Reggae Dub

1. Throne of Blood

- Trojan 12" Box Set

1. You're No Good
2. Born Free

- Trojan Dub Box Set Volume 2

1. Fist of Fury
2. Throne of Blood
3. Shaolin Temple

- Under Me Sleng Teng Extravaganza

1. Sweet Teng

- X-Ray Music

1. Step It Up in Dub
2. Dub There
3. The Champion Version
4. Dub Is My Occupation

=== Albums produced ===
- Anthony Johnson – A Yah We Deh (1985)
- Barry Brown – King Jammy Presents Barry Brown (1980)
- Barry Brown – Showcase (1980)
- Black Crucial – Mr. Sonny (1985)
- Black Sounds Uhro – Love Crisis (1977)
- Black Uhuru – Black Sounds of Freedom (1981)
- Black Uhuru & Prince Jammy – Uhuru in Dub (1982)
- Cocoa Tea – The Marshall (1985)
- Dennis Brown – History (1985)
- Dennis Brown – Slow Down (1985)
- Errol Holt – Vision of Africa (1978)
- Frankie Paul – Sara (1987)
- Frankie Paul & Michael Palmer – Double Trouble (1985)
- Half Pint – Money Man Skank (1984)
- Half Pint – One in a Million (1984)
- Kruxial Selecta- Long inna Time (1986)
- Horace Andy – Haul And Jack Up (1987)
- Hortense Ellis – Reflections (1979)
- Hugh Mundell Featuring Lacksley Castell – Jah Fire (1980)
- Johnny Osbourne – Folly Ranking (1980)
- Johnny Osbourne – Mr Body Bye (198?)
- Johnny Osbourne – Musical Chopper (1983)
- Johnny Osbourne – Water Pumping (1983)
- Jolly Brothers – Consciousness (1979)
- Junior Reid – Boom Shack A Lack (1985)
- King Tubby & Prince Jammy & Scientist – Dubwise Revolution (197?)
- Leroy Smart – She Just A Draw Card (1982)
- Leroy Smart – Showcase (1985)
- Leroy Smart – We Rule Everytime (1985)
- Little John – Clarks Booty (1985)
- Michael Palmer – I'm So Attractive (1985)
- Natural Vibes – Life Hard A Yard (1982)
- Niccademos (Nicodemus) – Dance Hall Style (1982)
- Noel Phillips – Youth Man Vibrations (1981)
- Peter Yellow – Hot (1982)
- Prince Jammy – Kamikazi Dub (1979)
- Prince Jammy – Osbourne in Dub (1983)
- Prince Jammy – Prince Jammy Destroys The Invaders (1982)
- Prince Jammy – Strictly Dub (1981)
- Prince Jammy & Various Artists – The Rhythm King (198?)
- Sugar Minott – A Touch of Class (1985)
- Sugar Minott – Bitter Sweet (1979)
- Tonto Irie – Jammy's Possee (198?)
- Travellers – Black Black Minds (1977)
- U Black – Westbound Thing A Swing (1977)
- U Brown – Mr Brown Something (1978)
- U Brown vs Peter Yellow – DJ Confrontation (1982)
- Various Artists – 10 To 1 (1985)
- Various Artists – 1985 Master Mega Hits (1985)
- Various Artists – 1985 Master Mega Hits Vol 2 (1985)
- Various Artists – King Jammy – A Man And His Music Vol 1 (197?–8?)
- Various Artists – King Jammy – A Man And His Music Vol 2 (198?)
- Various Artists – King Jammy – A Man And His Music Vol 3 (198?)
- Various Artists – King Jammy in Roots (197?–8?)
- Various Artists – King Jammy's at Channel 1 (1977–79)
- Various Artists – Prince Jammy Presents Vol 1 (1986)
- Various Artists – Superstar Hit Parade (1986)
- Various Artists – Under Me Sleng Teng Extravaganza (1985)
- Wayne Smith (musician) – Smoker Super (1985)
- Wayne Smith – Under Me Sleg Teng (1985)
- Wayne Smith – Youthman Skanking (1982)
- Ween – Friends EP (only track No. 4 "King Billy")

=== Albums engineered and/or mixed ===
- Agrovators – Kaya Dub (19770
- Alton Ellis – Many Moods of Alton Ellis (1978–80)
- Alton Ellis & Heptones – Alton Ellis Sings, Heptones Harmonise (1978–80)
- Augustus Pablo – El Rocker's (1972–75)
- Augustus Pablo – Rockers Meets King Tubby in a Fire House (1980)
- Augustus Pablo – Original Rockers (1972–75)
- Barrington Levy – Englishman (1979)
- Barrington Levy – Englishman – Robin Hood (1979–80)
- Barry Brown – King Jammy Presents Barry Brown (1980)
- Barry Brown – The Best of Barry Brown (197?)
- Barry Brown Meets Cornell Campbell – Barry Brown Meets Cornell Campbell (197?)
- Bim Sherman – Ghetto Dub (1988)
- Bim Sherman Meets Horace Andy And U Black – In A Rub A Dub Style (1982)
- Black Sounds Uhro – Love Crisis (1977)
- Black Uhuru – Black Sounds of Freedom (1981)
- Black Uhuru & Prince Jammy – Uhuru in Dub (1982)
- Carl Harvey – Ecstasy of Mankind (1978)
- Carlton Patterson & King Tubby – Psalms of Drums (197?)
- Cornell Campbell – Boxing (1982)
- Cornell Campbell – Follow Instructions (1983)
- Cornell Campbell – Turn Back The Hands of Time (1977)
- Creation Rebel – Close Encounters of the Third World (1978)
- Crucial Bunny Vs Prince Jammy – Fat Man Dub Contest (1979)
- DEB Music Players – 20th Century DEB-Wise (1978)
- David Jahson – Natty Chase The Barber (1978)
- Delroy Wilson – Go Away Dream (1982)
- Dennis Brown – Slow Down (1985)
- Dennis Brown Presents Prince Jammy – Umoja – 20th Century DEBwise (1978)
- Dillinger – Cornbread (1978)
- Earl "Chinna" Smith – Sticky Fingers (1977)
- Eek A Mouse – Wa Do Dem (1981)
- Frankie Paul & Michael Palmer – Double Trouble (1985)
- Gregory Isaacs – Slum in Dub (1978)
- Half Pint – One in a Million (1984)
- Horace Andy – In The Light / In The Light Dub (1977)
- Hortense Ellis – Jamaica's First Lady of Songs (1977)
- Hugh Mundell Featuring Lacksley Castell – Jah Fire (1980)
- I Roy – Can't Conquer Rasta (1976)
- Jah Frankie Jones – Satta An Praise Jah (1977)
- Jah Lloyd – Black Moses (1979)
- Jah Stitch – Original Ragga Muffin (1975–77)
- Johnny Clarke – Don't Stay Out Late (1977)
- Johnny Clarke – Dread Natty Congo(1977)
- Johnny Clarke – Sweet Conversation (1977)
- Johnny Osbourne – Folly Ranking (1980)
- Johnny Osbourne – Musical Chopper (1983)
- Johnny Osbourne – Water Pumping (1983)
- Junior Reid – Boom Shack A Lack (1985)
- Keith Hudson – Rasta Communication (1978)
- King Tubby – Dub Gone Crazy (1975–79)
- King Tubby – Dub Like Dirt (1975–77)
- King Tubby – Majestic Dub (197?)
- King Tubby's and the Agrovators – Dubbing in the Back Yard (1982)
- King Tubby & Aggrovators – Shalom Dub (1975)
- King Tubby & Prince Jammy – Dub Gone 2 Crazy (1975–79)
- King Tubby & Prince Jammy & Scientist – First, Second And Third Generation of Dub (1981)
- Leroy Smart – Reggae Showcase Vol 1 (197?)
- Leroy Smart – Superstar (1977)
- Leroy Smart – Superstar (1976)
- Linval Thompson & Wayne Jarrett & Ranking Trevor – Train To Zion Dub (1981)
- Lord Sassafrass – Horse Man Connection (1982)
- Michael Prophet – Serious Reasoning (1980)
- Mikey Dread – African Anthem (1979)
- Mikey Dread – Dread at the Controls (1979)
- Mother Liza With Kojak – Chant Down Babylon (198?)
- Noel Phillips – Youth Man Vibrations (1981)
- Paragons – Heaven & Earth (197?)
- Paragons – Now (1982)
- Pat Kelly – One Man Stand (1979)
- Peter Yellow – Hot (1982)
- Prince Far I – Cry Tuff Dub Encounter II (1979)
- Prince Hammer – World War Dub Part 1 (1979)
- Prince Jammy – Dub Culture (1983]
- Prince Jammy – Fatman vrs. Shaka in a Dub Conference (1980)
- Prince Jammy – Kamikazi Dub (1979)
- Prince Jammy – Prince Jammy Destroys The Invaders (1982)
- Prince Jammy – Strictly Dub (1981)
- Revolutionaries – Goldmine Dub (1979)
- Rockers All Stars – Chanting Dub with the Help of the Father (1978)
- Rod Taylor – Ethiopians Kings (1975–80)
- Scientist – Heavy Metal Dub (1982)
- Sly & Robbie – Raiders of the Lost Dub (1981)
- Sly and the Revolutionaries With Jah Thomas – Black Ash Dub (1980)
- Sugar Minott – Bitter Sweet (1979)
- Sugar Minott – Black Roots (1980)
- Sugar Minott – Ghetto-ology (1979)
- Tappa Zukie – Escape From Hell (1977)
- Tappa Zukie – Tapper Roots (1978)
- The Agrovators – Jammies in Lion Dub Style (1978)
- The Rass-es Band & Prince Jammy – Harder Na Rass (1979)
- Tommy McCook – Blazing Horns – Tenor in Roots (1976–78)
- Tommy McCook & Bobby Ellis – Blazing Horns (1977)
- Travellers – Black Black Minds (1977)
- Trinity – Dreadlocks Satisfaction (1978)
- U Brown – Mr Brown Something (1978)
- Uniques – Showcase (1978)
- Various Artists – Superstar Hit Parade (1986)
- Wayne Smith – Smoker Super (1985)
- Wayne Smith – Youthman Skanking (1982)
- Ween – Friends EP (only track No. 4 "King Billy")
- Yabby U – Jah Jah Way (1980)
- Yabby You – Beware (1978)
- Yabby You – Dub It to the Top (1976–79)
- Yabby You & Various Artists – Jesus Dread (1972–77)

=== As an arranger ===
- Black Crucial – Mr. Sonny (1985)
- Black Sounds Uhro – Love Crisis (1977)
- Dennis Brown – History (1985)
- Dennis Brown – Slow Down (1985)
- Johnny Osbourne – Folly Ranking (1980)
- Noel Phillips – Youth Man Vibrations (1981)
- The Agrovators – Jammies in Lion Dub Style (1978)

==== As a percussionist ====
- Dennis Brown – Slow Down (1985)
- Johnny Osbourne – Water Pumping (1983)

== Bibliography ==
- Lesser, Beth (1989). King Jammy's. Muzik Tree, UK. ISBN 1-55022-525-1.
- Bradley, Lloyd (2002). Reggae: The Story of Jamaican Music. London, UK: BBC Worldwide. ISBN 0-563-48807-7.
