= Stalag riddim =

Reggae riddim

"Stalag 17"

Song by Ansel Collins
- B-side: "Everybody Watching Everybody (Max Romeo)"
- Released: 1973
- Genre: Reggae
- Length: 3:00
- Label: Techniques
- Composer: Ansel Collins
- Producer: Winston Riley

The Stalag riddim (or Stalag version) is a popular reggae riddim, which came to prominence in the 1980s. It was originally written and recorded as "Stalag 17" (named after the 1953 war film) by Ansel Collins and released by Winston Riley's Techniques record label in 1973. The riddim has been used on hundreds of derivative records.

== History ==
Ansel Collins and Santa Davis both recalled in separate interviews that Winston Riley's brother Buster was the one who organized the recording session that produced "Stalag 17". The Rileys ran a jukebox business, and Davis recalls that Winston was busy with those on the day of the recording at Harry J Studio. Collins said Buster's idea was to have him play with the Soul Syndicate on seven tunes. He went into the session with the idea for "Stalag 17", told the musicians the style he wanted, and everyone came up with their own parts. Davis said the song "was a collaborative effort of everyone putting in their little ingredients in the pot". He also claimed Buster tried to pay him for his session work with coins straight out of the Riley's jukeboxes.

"Stalag 17" was a big seller in Jamaica. Other artists started to use it on B-sides of records for dub instrumentals. The Stalag riddim was used for songs by General Echo, Barrington Levy, Big Youth, and Prince Far I.

In 1980, the Wailers played Stalag riddim as an introduction on the Uprising Tour. Keyboardist Tyrone Downie chanted "Marley!" over the riddim while Bob Marley came onstage. This intro is commonly called the "Marley chant" among fans. The song was so influential that even Jamaican jazz artists like Monty Alexander felt compelled to interpret it.

== Personnel ==
- Ansel Collins, keyboards
- George "Fully" Fullwood, bass
- Carlton "Santa" Davis, drums
- Tony Chin, guitar
- Earl "Chinna" Smith, guitar

== Sister Nancy ==
Sister Nancy brought the Stalag riddim to dancehall with her 1982 hit "Bam Bam", which was produced by Winston Riley. Over Collins' track, she sang original lyrics with a chorus that quoted a 1966 song by the Maytals with Byron Lee and the Dragonaires called "Bam-Bam". Sister Nancy's song is one of the most widely sampled in the history of reggae, spreading the Stalag riddim even further. "Bam Bam" appears in "Famous" by Kanye West, Jay-Z's "Bam, and other records by artists like Lauryn Hill and Pete Rock.

== Legacy ==
In 1984, Winston Riley further built on the success of the Stalag riddim with an entire album of songs based on the track. Original Stalag 17–18 and 19 featured artwork by Wilfred Limonious and recordings by Yami Bolo, Michael Prophet, and other artists. "Stalag 17" was included as the last track and was now attributed to the "Technique All Star".

The album included "Ring the Alarm" by Tenor Saw, which relies on the Stalag riddim like every other track on the LP. It became the biggest song of Tenor Saw's career and his chorus became a touchstone in pop music, used by artists as diverse as Mos Def and Fugazi.

The riddim also influenced hip-hop, and can be discerned on Public Enemy's hit "Don't Believe the Hype" as well as on Too Short's "Blowjob Betty". Stalag riddim is so widely known that even a brief quote of it can be used to signify a connection to Jamaican culture, like the sample of the horns in the Blackout remix of "This Is Why I'm Hot" by Mims.

Steely & Clevie used Stalag riddim in their production for Reggie Stepper called "Drum Pan Sound", which has been sampled by Run-DMC, Nas, and Lords of the Underground.

Bounty Killer sampled the song on "Go Now", "Kill a Sound", and "Gun Down", because "Stalag is the wickedest rhythm." Despite not composing or performing on "Stalag 17", Winston Riley owned the copyright and got into a dispute with Bounty Killer over the sample, even though he gave the rapper permission to use it.

Reggaeton artists like DJ Playero often rely on the Stalag riddim.
