= Bam Bam (Sister Nancy song) =

Single by Sister Nancy

from the album One, Two
- Released: 1982
- Recorded: 1982
- Studio: Channel One Studios
- Genre: Reggae, dancehall
- Length: 3:17
- Label: Techniques Records
- Songwriters: Winston Riley; Ophlin Russell
- Producer: Winston Riley

Sister Nancy singles chronology
"One Two" (1982)	"Bam Bam" (1982)	"Transport Connection" (1982)

"Bam Bam" is a 1982 song by Jamaican dancehall recording artist Sister Nancy. The song's chorus was inspired by the 1966 song of the same name, by Toots and the Maytals and Byron Lee and the Dragonaires. The song's instrumental samples the 1974 song "Stalag 17", by Ansell Collins, a well known riddim, alternatively known as a backing track used repeatedly. The song has been labeled as a "well-known reggae anthem" by BBC and a "classic" by The Observer.

In 2016, Billboard called the song "a strong contender for the title of most sampled reggae song of all time." When asked her opinion of the many songs that have used her voice over the years, she responded: "I don’t know if I hear all of them. They sample it so much times but none of them is my favorite. The reason why I say that is they know how to contact me. They know I live in the U.S. and nobody try to contact me to do it in person. They always sample the tune. If they had contacted me and I would do it for them live then I would have a favorite."

In 2014, Sister Nancy's daughter pointed out that the song was playing on the TV in a Reebok commercial and, thus, she finally decided to seek legal advice and guidance on properly obtaining rights to her own music. For 32 years, Sister Nancy did not receive any royalties for her song. At the end of the settlement, she was unable to receive compensation for all 32 years of unpaid royalties, but did receive compensation for the last 10 years and 50% of the rights to her song “Bam Bam”.

In 2015, the song topped the iTunes Reggae Chart.

== Early influences ==
The Jamaican sampling culture repurposes one sound over and over again in a sort of "Call and Response" practice rooted in African oral traditions. These artists are called by one song or its artist to respond with their own versions and all are consequently brought together in an antiphonetic musical dialogue. Sister Nancy's "Bam Bam" is no exception to this musical dialogue.

The popular phrase "bam bam" was introduced into the music scene first in 1966 by Toots and the Maytals. The catchy hypnotic phrase, bam bam, led to its longevity that surpassed the popularity of roots reggae and was incorporated into the resurging dancehall genre, where many dancehall vocalists (or deejays) would use the lyrics and/or the popular phrase.

Mike Steyels states that Sister Nancy's immediate inspiration to sing the popular phrase was "hearing Yellowman and Fathead record their own version of 'Bam Bam' over the 'Taxi Riddim' in another studio just weeks before her own recording". Sister Nancy, however, sampled the Toots and the Maytals's "Bam Bam" over the Stalag riddim instead, a popular reggae riddim which came to prominence in the 1970s. The Stalag riddim was first introduced in a reggae song called "Stalag 17", written and performed by Ansell Collins and released by Winston Riley's Techniques record label in 1973.

The melody and cadence of the "Bam Bam" refrain in the chorus of Sister Nancy's version closely follows the original background melody of Toots and The Maytals' "Bam Bam". R. Henry Gordon, N. N. McCarthy and Frederick "Toots" Hibbert hold the copyright to the original version of the song, but were never compensated royalties for use of the song by Sister Nancy or any artist who sampled her cover.

== International success ==
Sister Nancy was unaware of "Bam Bam"'s success outside of Jamaica until she moved to the United States in 1996.

After Sister Nancy released her One, Two album, she recalls never hearing "'Bam Bam' play one time in Jamaica". However, her producer traveled all over the world during the recording of her album and after it was released. He knew how popular "Bam Bam" had gotten, yet he "never wanted [Sister Nancy] to know". Once Sister Nancy heard her song in the 1998 film Belly, she realized its impact and popularity. It also dawned on her that she had not been credited or given royalties for the past 16 years since the song had been released. Sister Nancy tried to contact and set up a meeting with her producer, but he never showed or tried to meet with her. She believed he avoided her all this time and kept her in the dark because he knew she would ask him for money.

Rolling Stone ranked "Bam Bam" at number 454 on its 2021 edition of the "500 Greatest Songs of All Time".

=== Charts ===
Chart (2024–2025)	Peak position
UK Physical Singles (OCC)	36
UK Vinyl Singles (OCC)	28

=== Certifications ===
Region	Certification	Certified units/sales
New Zealand (RMNZ)	Platinum	30,000^{‡}
United Kingdom (BPI) Sales since 2008	Gold	400,000^{‡}
^{‡} Sales+streaming figures based on certification alone.

== Samples and interpolations ==
"Bam Bam" has been sampled well over one hundred times, in different media alike, making it (arguably) one of the most-sampled reggae songs, ever. According to WhoSampled, a user-generated website cataloging samples, "Bam Bam" has appeared, in some form, in over 130 tracks as of 2022.

One of the most famous electronic songs that sampled "Bam Bam"—and is sometimes referred to as a remix of Sister Nancy's song—is "Waterman" by Olav Basoski (featuring Michie One), released in 2005. In the song, there is frequent use of the "Bam Bam" riddim in addition to use of Sister Nancy's own vocals.

Artists who have sampled or interpolated "Bam Bam" include:

- Chaka Demus & Pliers, on their 1992 song of the same name
- CL Smooth and Pete Rock, on their 1992 song "The Basement".
- Lauryn Hill, in her song "Lost Ones" from the 1998 hit album The Miseducation of Lauryn Hill.
- Too $hort, on his 1993 song "Blowjob Betty (Get In Where You Fit In)".
- Groove Armada, on their 2001 song "Fogma".
- Guerilla Black (featuring Beenie Man) on his 2004 debut single, "Compton".
- Chris Brown (featuring Wiz Khalifa), on the 2011 song "Bomb".
- Kat DeLuna, on her 2015 song "Bum Bum".
- Kanye West (featuring Rihanna), on the 2016 song "Famous", from The Life of Pablo. Sister Nancy has noted that she has missed-out on a large portion of royalties as a result of not receiving credit on this song, but thought that it was a positive thing West used it, saying: "When I heard [West] do it I just thought: 'Well, that’s good for me.' Whatever way he takes it, it’s very good for me because it keeps me moving. Do you know what I’m saying? It keeps me working."
- Beyoncé, with her live performance of "Hold Up", from her 2016 album Lemonade.
- Jay-Z, in the song "Bam" from the 2017 album 4:44. Jay-Z actually traveled to Jamaica to record the music video for the song. While on his visit, Jay-Z actually stopped to meet Sister Nancy, who is featured in the video. The rapper spent three days with her.
- Lizzo, on her 2017 song "Truth Hurts".
- Timaya, in his 2018 song by the same name in which interpolates the chorus.
- Logic (featuring My Dad), in the song "BOBBY", from the 2019 album Confessions of a Dangerous Mind.
- Hugel, on his 2025 track "Jamaican (Bam Bam)" with Solto.
- Main Source on "Just Hangin' Out", from the 1991 album Breaking Atoms.
- Spice, fellow Jamaican artist and "Queen of Dancehall", sang a version of the song's melody over her own lyrics in the song "Romantic Mood" from her 2018 mixtape, Captured.
- Ryan Castro (featuring Kapo and Gangsta), on the 2025 song “La Villa”, from the album Hopi Sendé. The song topped the Billboard Argentina and Colombia Hot 100 charts for six weeks in 2026 and reached No. 1 on Billboard’s US Latin Airplay chart.
- Olav Basoski (featuring Michie One), on the 2004 house track "Waterman".

== In other media ==
In 1998, "Bam Bam" was featured in the Hype Williams film Belly. In 2014, "Bam Bam" was featured in the Seth Rogen/Evan Goldberg film The Interview. The song was also featured in the EA's skateboarding video game Skate. In 2022, it was featured in the fourth season (first episode) of Ozark. The song also plays in a nightclub in season 3 episode 3 of Dexter.
