= One, Two =

Studio album by Sister Nancy
- Released: 1982
- Recorded: Channel One Studios
- Genre: Reggae
- Label: Techniques Records
- Producer: Winston Riley

One, Two is a 1982 album by Sister Nancy. Originally issued on vinyl, it was reissued on compact disc in 1992.

== Track listing ==
1. "One Two"
2. "I Am a Geddion"
3. "Aint No Stopping Nancy"
4. "Gwan a School"
5. "Coward of the Country"
6. "Bam Bam"
7. "Transport Connection"
8. "Pegion Rock"
9. "Roof Over Mi Head"
10. "Only Woman DJ with Degree"

== Personnel ==
- Errol "Flabba" Holt, Robbie Shakespeare - bass
- Carlton "Santa" Davis, Sly Dunbar, Lincoln "Style" Scott - drums
- Ansel Collins, Wycliffe "Steale" Johnson, Winston Wright - keyboards
- Marvin Brooks, Skully, Christopher "Sky Juice" Blake - percussion
- Bobby Ellis, Dean Frazer, Ronald "Namboo" Robinson - horns

== Charts ==
| Chart (2025) | Peak position |
|---|---|
| UK Independent Album Breakers (OCC) | 4 |

== Release history ==
Release history
| Date | Label | Format | Cat. No. |
|---|---|---|---|
| 1982 | Techniques | LP | WR 1990 |
| 1999 | Techniques | CD | WRCD 0039 |
| 12 April 2025 | Techniques/VPAL Music | LP (Blue vinyl) | VPALWR52270 |
| 22 August 2025 | Techniques/VPAL Music | LP | VPALWR52272 |
| 17 July 2026 | Techniques/VPAL Music | LP (Blue/Yellow vinyl) | VPALWR52275 |
