= Taylor Swift–Kanye West feud =

Music industry feud

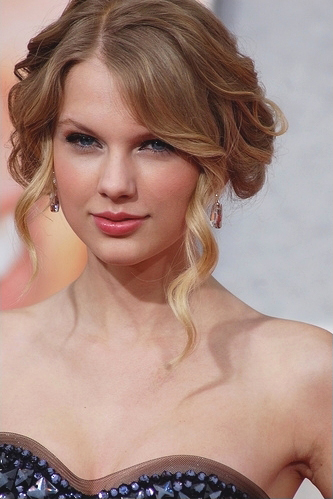
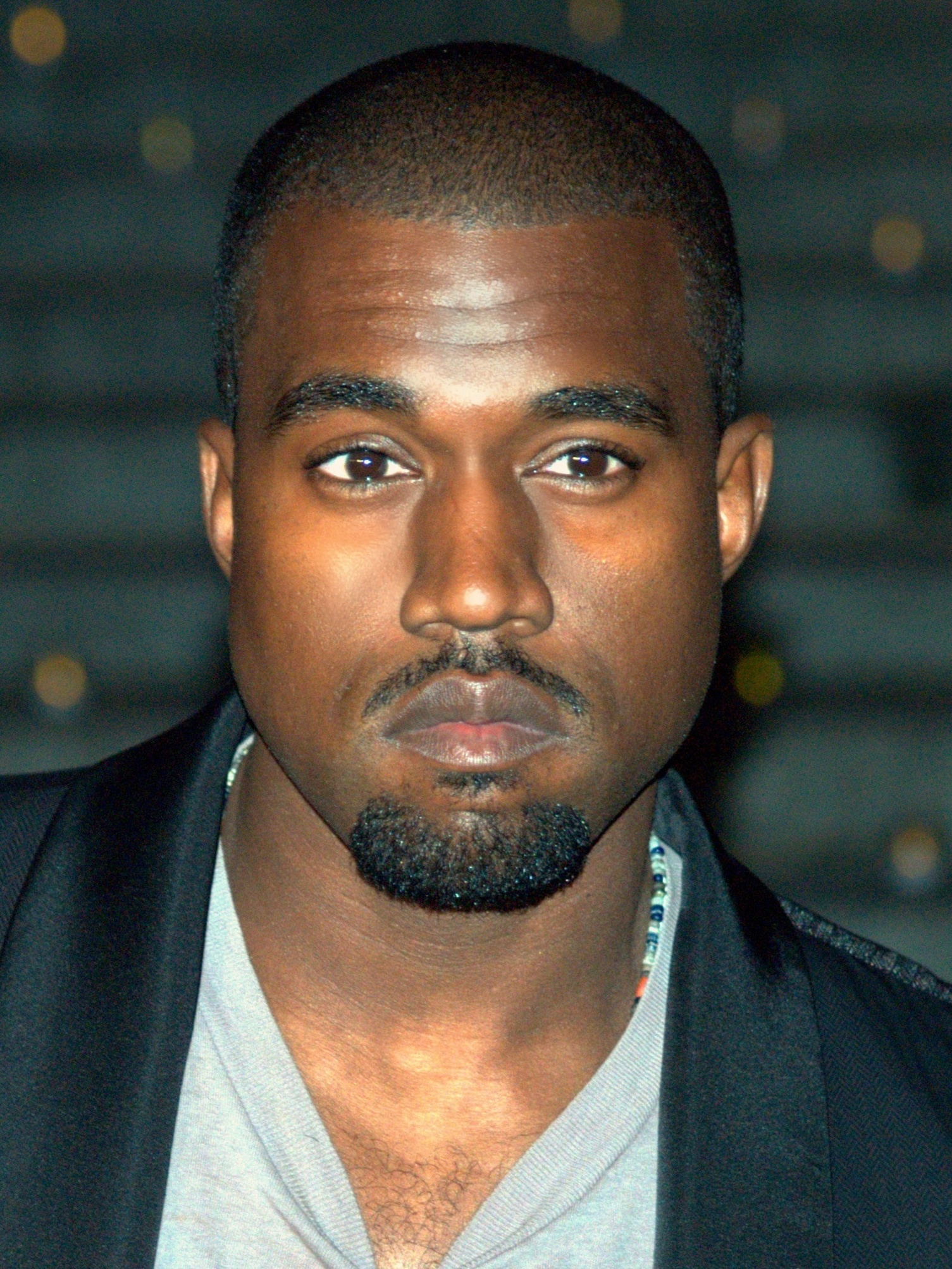
- Taylor Swift in 2009 Kanye West in 2009
- Date: September 13, 2009 – present (17 years, 2 months and 4 days)
- Caused by: West's interruption of Swift's speech at the 2009 MTV Video Music Awards; West's release of "Famous" in 2016
- Medium: Diss tracks, social media
- Status: Ongoing

Parties
| Taylor Swift; Selena Gomez; Jack Antonoff | Kanye West; Kim Kardashian; Ty Dolla Sign |

Works
| "Innocent"; "Look What You Made Me Do"; "This Is Why We Can't Have Nice Things"; "Thank You Aimee" | "See Me Again"; "Famous"; "Carnival"; "Lifestyle" |

American singer-songwriter Taylor Swift and American rapper Kanye West have been involved in highly publicized disputes since September 2009, when Swift won the MTV Video Music Award (VMA) for Best Female Video for "You Belong With Me" (2009) at the 2009 MTV Video Music Awards, and West interrupted her acceptance speech. The feud between Swift and West has been described as one of the music industry's most infamous and has been the subject of widespread coverage and debate.

When West interrupted Swift's speech, he took the microphone and claimed that Beyoncé's music video for "Single Ladies (Put a Ring on It)" (2008) is one of the greatest videos of all time. Swift left the stage amidst booing, which she thought was aimed at her. Later in the evening, Beyoncé invited Swift to complete her speech after winning Video of the Year for "Single Ladies". West was widely criticized on television and media outlets, and he later apologized and recanted multiple times. Critics interpreted Swift's 2010 song "Innocent" as sympathizing with West. The two eventually became amicable over the years. Swift presented West with the Video Vanguard Award at the 2015 MTV Video Music Awards and parodied the 2009 incident. West, who had personally asked Swift to present the award, implied in his acceptance speech that MTV had her present the award to him to increase the show's viewership, which upset Swift.

In 2016, West released the single "Famous", in which he referred to Swift as a "bitch" that he made famous. Swift protested the pejorative but West claimed he obtained prior approval of the lyrics from Swift, which she denied. The music video for "Famous" showcased naked wax sculptures of Swift amongst other celebrities; Swift stated she did not consent to it, calling it "revenge porn". Kim Kardashian, who was West's wife at the time, released trimmed video clips of a phone conversation which appeared to show Swift approving the lyrics, following which Swift was widely criticized on various media. In 2017, after a social media blackout, Swift responded with the single "Look What You Made Me Do" from her album Reputation, which was partly inspired by the negative press she received. The track "This Is Why We Can't Have Nice Things" also appeared to diss West.

The full video recording of the phone call between West and Swift leaked online in 2020, revealing Swift had approved to be name-dropped but was not informed about the lyrics and the pejorative used, and that Kardashian has edited the clip favorably. In 2024, West and Ty Dolla Sign released the single "Carnival", which contained sexually suggestive lyrics about Swift, and the track "Lifestyle", which referenced Swift and her husband, Travis Kelce. Swift also aimed at Kardashian in the track "Thank You Aimee" (2024). Throughout the 2020s, West made several claims about Swift, sometimes derogatory, on Instagram and Twitter (X).

== History ==
=== 2009–10: Initial controversy and apology ===
==== 2009 MTV Video Music Awards ====
Kanye West taking the microphone from Swift at the 2009 MTV Video Music Awards, marking the beginning of the feud

On September 13, 2009, Swift and West separately attended the 2009 MTV Video Music Awards. Swift subsequently won the MTV Video Music Award for Best Female Video for her song "You Belong With Me", becoming the first country singer to do so. At age 19, Swift was also one of the youngest artists to win an MTV Video Music Award. While Swift was delivering her acceptance speech, West, who was in the audience, climbed the stage, interrupted her, and took the microphone. He then declared, "Yo, Taylor, I'm really happy for you, and I'mma let you finish, but Beyoncé had one of the best videos of all time!" Beyoncé's song "Single Ladies (Put a Ring on It)" had also been nominated for the Best Female Video Award. While West was talking, the audience began booing, which Swift thought was aimed at her. Following West's declaration, Swift left the stage looking upset. Swift's then-boyfriend, Taylor Lautner, had presented the award to her and later revealed that he thought West's interruption was a rehearsed skit.

Shortly after the interruption, Swift performed "You Belong With Me" for the VMAs audience. Later that evening, Beyoncé won the Video of the Year Award and invited Swift on stage to finish her speech. After the ceremony, Swift was interviewed by reporters. She told them "I was standing on stage and I was really excited because I'd just won the award and then I was really excited because Kanye West was on stage... And then I wasn't excited anymore after that." They then asked if she was a fan of West prior to the incident; she stated that she was. The incident led to Internet photo memes using the phrase "I'mma let you finish". The media and people on the Internet began referring to the incident as "Kanye-gate". West's actions were met with widespread criticism. TMZ released a recording of the then-President of the United States, Barack Obama, calling West a "jackass" and saying the incident was "inappropriate". The audio was recorded immediately before Obama began a television interview with CNBC. Before the VMAs broadcast had finished, West posted an apology on his blog, saying he was wrong, that he would apologize to Swift, and that Beyoncé had the best video of the decade.

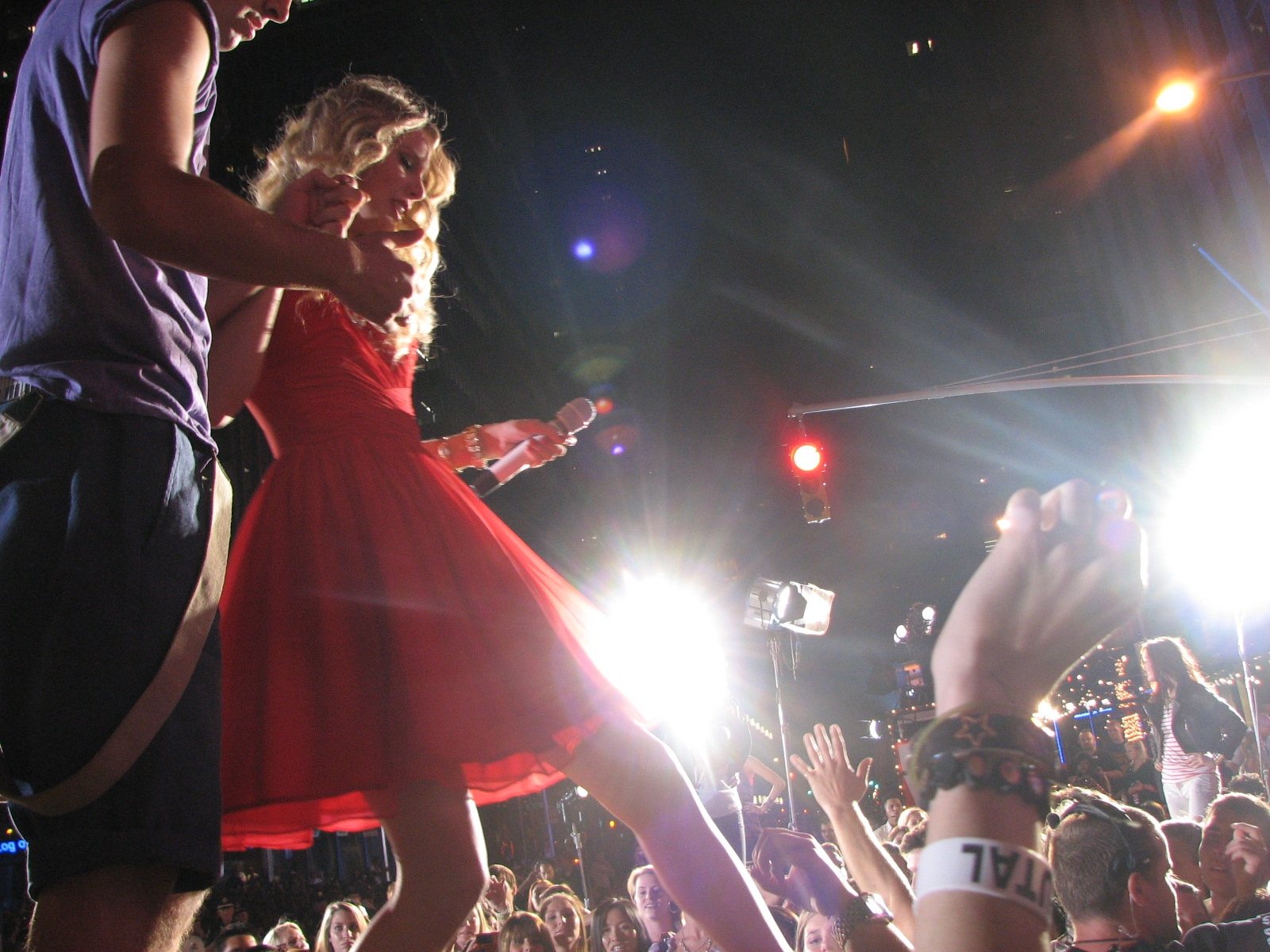
Swift performing at the 2009 MTV Video Music Awards shortly after winning the award for Best Female Video

The day after the VMAs, West made a pre-planned appearance on The Jay Leno Show, though the interview portion of his appearance was not previously planned. He apologized to Swift, stating "It's been extremely difficult. I'm just dealing with the fact that I hurt someone or took anything away [...] from a talented artist or from anyone, 'cause I only wanted to help people [...] I immediately knew in this situation that it was wrong [...] It's actually someone's emotions that I stepped on and it was very, it was just, it was rude, period. And [...] I'd like to be able to apologize to her in person." On September 15, 2009, Swift appeared on The View, explaining that West had still not called her personally to apologize. During her interview, Swift stated "I'm not going to say I wasn't rattled by it. I had to perform live five minutes later, so I had to get myself back to the place where I could perform... All the other artists who showed me love in the hours following that, I just never imagined there were that many people out there looking out for me." Following the episode, The View released a statement saying, West "spoke personally to the country music superstar via telephone and has apologized to the 19-year-old singer. She has accepted Mr. West's apology. The contents of the phone call are to remain private." Swift told ABC News Radio that West "was very sincere in his apology and I accepted that apology." That same year, Kim Kardashian, who would later become involved in the feud, told reporters that her favorite song was Swift's "Love Story".

On November 7, 2009, Swift hosted Saturday Night Live. Swift wrote her own opening monologue, joking about the incident. In what she titled the "Monologue Song (La La La)", Swift strummed her acoustic guitar and sang, "You might think I might say/ something bad about Kanye/ and how he ran up on the stage and ruined my VMA monologue/ but there's nothing more to say/ because everything's okay/ I’ve got security lining the stage." Following this line, Bill Hader and Jason Sudeikis appeared behind her, dressed as security guards and holding up a facial composite drawing of West. At the conclusion of the monologue, Swift said "We have a great show. Kanye West is not here!"

==== "Innocent" ====
In early September 2010, West again apologized on Twitter for his comments about Swift in a series of tweets. He then said that he had written a song for Swift, before subsequently deleting his Twitter account. On September 12, 2010, Swift debuted her new single "Innocent" during a performance at the 2010 MTV Video Music Awards. The performance began by playing footage of West interrupting Swift at the 2009 ceremony. Swift then started singing the chorus, which contained the lyrics, "It's all right/ Just wait and see/ Your string of lights is still bright to me/ Who you are is not where you've been/ You're still an innocent/ It's OK/ Life is a tough crowd/ 32 and still growing up now." West was 32 years old at the 2009 VMAs. Some felt that the song was deeply sympathetic toward West, while others felt it was patronizing. Others criticized Swift as playing the victim of the angry black man. A critic at the Los Angeles Times called the lyrics "slams disguised as 'forgiveness'". Swift had written the song between February and June 2010, with Swift stating the track took her longer to write than most of her other songs. The song was officially released on October 25, 2010, as part of her studio album Speak Now.

Also in October 2010, West appeared on the Ellen DeGeneres Show, claiming that after the 2009 VMAs controversy he had left the country to live overseas for a while. He told DeGeneres, "I feel in some ways I'm a soldier of culture. And I realize no one wants that to be my job. I'll never go onstage again, I'll never sit at an awards show again, but will I feel conflicted about things that meant something to culture that constantly get denied for years and years and years? I'm sorry, I will. I cannot lie about it in order to sell records." West said the incident was the result of "sincerity and alcohol". On October 23, "See Me Again", an unreleased song by West, leaked online. Journalists interpreted the lyrics, which feature vocals heavily processed through Auto-Tune, as West discussing the aftermath of the VMAs controversy.

=== 2011–early 2015: Favorable relationship ===
In March 2012, Swift appeared on the cover of Harper's Bazaar Australia, wearing a shirt from West's clothing line. During this time, the two were on good terms and would occasionally go to dinner together.

On June 11, 2013, West was promoting his sixth studio album, Yeezus, and discussed the VMAs controversy with The New York Times. He stated that he did not have any regrets about interrupting Swift. West claimed that his fifth studio album, My Beautiful Dark Twisted Fantasy (2010), was a "backhanded apology" and that he had fallen to "peer pressure", which many interpreted as West rescinding his 2009 apology. In August 2013, Swift gifted a jar of homemade jam to her friend Ed Sheeran. Sheeran posted a photo of the jar, on which Swift had written "Yo Ed, I'm really happy 4 you and I'm gonna let u finish but this is the best JAM OF ALL TIME. – T".

On February 8, 2015, at the 57th Annual Grammy Awards, West and Swift posed together for photographs on the red carpet. In an interview with Ryan Seacrest, West revealed that after Beck won the award for Album of the Year over Beyoncé, Swift approached West and jokingly told him that he should have gone on stage. West also stated that he wanted to record music with Swift. In August 2015, Swift appeared on the September issue of Vanity Fair. In the magazine, Swift stated that she and West had become friends, citing assistance from their mutual friend, rapper Jay-Z, the husband of Beyoncé. She stated that there was no plan to collaborate musically, but that she "like[d] him as a person".

=== Late 2015–20: Feud is reignited ===
==== 2015 MTV Video Music Awards ====
At the 2015 MTV Video Music Awards on August 30, 2015, West won the Michael Jackson Video Vanguard Award. Prior to the show, West called Swift to ask if she would present him with the award, which Swift was excited about doing. During her presentation, Swift stated that West's album The College Dropout was the first album she bought on iTunes when she was 12 years old. She ended her speech by saying, "I guess I have to say to all the other winners tonight: I'm really happy for you, and I'mma let you finish, but Kanye West has had one of the greatest careers of all time!" After accepting the award, West stated: "You know how many times they announced Taylor was going to give me the award 'cause it got them more ratings?" He also announced that he was running for President in 2020. Swift was upset by his comments since he had asked her to present the award, later reflecting on the incident and calling him "two-faced". West sent Swift a large floral arrangement to apologize. Swift posted a photograph of the arrangement on her Instagram, joking about being his running mate, and the duo briefly returned to good terms.

==== "Famous" and Kim Kardashian's release of recorded phone call clips ====
On February 9, 2016, West debuted the single "Famous" at a Yeezy fashion show. The song referenced the 2009 VMAs incident, containing the lyrics "I feel like me and Taylor might still have sex/ Why? I made that bitch famous." The lyrics were met with backlash, upset Swift, and re-ignited the feud. West claimed that he had called Swift prior to the song's release, and that Swift had approved the lyrics. He stated that he did not "diss" her with his new track. Swift's publicist, Tree Paine, released a statement on her Twitter account, claiming that "Kanye did not call for approval, but to ask Taylor to release his single 'Famous' on her Twitter account. She declined and cautioned him about releasing a song with such a strong misogynistic message. Taylor was never made aware of the actual lyric 'I made that bitch famous.'"

On February 12, 2016, several friends of Swift, including Karlie Kloss, Gigi Hadid, and Jaime King, addressed West's lyrics on social media. Swift's brother, Austin Swift, posted an Instagram video of himself trashing his Yeezy 350 Boosts. West also addressed the controversy, stating that "bitch" was an "endearing" term. On February 15, 2016, at the 58th Annual Grammy Awards, Swift won the Album of the Year Award for her fifth studio album, 1989. In her acceptance speech, Swift discussed not letting others take credit for her fame, a reference to West. On February 17, 2016, an audio recording of West at Saturday Night Live leaked in which he complained about Swift, calling her a "fake ass" and saying she should "let it go". "Famous" was officially released on February 14, 2016, as part of his studio album The Life of Pablo.

On June 16, 2016, West's then-wife, Kim Kardashian, appeared on the cover of GQ. In her interview with the magazine, Kardashian claimed that Swift had approved the lyrics in "Famous" prior to the song's release. She claimed that many people in the industry had been present during the phone conversation between West and Swift, including Rick Rubin. Kardashian referenced Swift's 2016 Grammys acceptance speech, claiming that Swift was just trying to "play the victim again." Kardashian also stated that West often referred to her as a "bitch" in his songs, and that it was not derogatory. Following Kardashian's interview, Paine released a statement to Billboard, claiming that Swift had no animosity toward Kardashian, but that much of what Kardashian was saying was not true. She agreed that West and Swift had talked on the phone in January 2016 and that West had asked Swift to release the song on her Twitter account. Paine emphasized that Swift had no knowledge of West's intention to call Swift a "bitch" in the song, and that Taylor had heard the song for the first time when it was released. Paine stated that Swift was "humiliated" by the lyrics. Swift also stated that the videos were recorded illegally without her knowledge or consent, in violation of California's telephone call recording law.

On June 24, 2016, West released the music video for "Famous" at an exclusive event hosted by Tidal at The Forum in Inglewood, California. The video was inspired by Vincent Desiderio's painting Sleep, and featured naked wax dolls of Swift and other celebrities in a large bed with West. Lena Dunham, a friend of Swift, described the video as "disturbing". In 2019, Swift described the wax doll as "revenge porn". The video was nominated for Best Male Video and Video of the Year at the 2016 MTV Video Music Awards, Best Hip-Hop Video at the 2016 MTV Video Music Awards Japan, Best Video at the 2016 MTV Europe Music Awards, and Best Video at the 2017 NME Awards.

On July 14, 2016, a trailer for the upcoming season of Keeping Up with the Kardashians was released. In the trailer, Kardashian was seen defending West, stating that people were "making him look a certain way" and that she will "do whatever to protect my husband." The episode premiered on July 17. It featured Kardashian discussing the "Famous" lyrics controversy with her sister, Kourtney Kardashian. During the episode, Kardashian claimed that Swift had helped West write some of the lyrics. Kardashian's mom, Kris Jenner, also appeared in the episode and advised Kardashian to call Swift and clear the air. Kardashian said she was not going to take the advice. On separate occasions, Charlamagne Tha God and Kenneth Ehrlich supported Kardashian's claim that Swift had helped write the lyrics and West tweeted that Swift had "inadvertently helped write the lyrics."

Immediately following the episode's release, Kardashian released trimmed video clips of Swift's phone call with West on Snapchat. She followed the clips by tweeting a series of snake emojis, claiming that it was National Snake Day, and that "they have holidays for everybody, I mean everything these days!" The clips appeared to support West's claim that Swift had approved the lyrics for "Famous", with the two speaking about the line "I feel like me and Taylor might still have sex." Taylor could be heard on the video stating "It's like a compliment", after West read her the lyrics. She also stated, "If people ask me about it, look, I think it would be great for me to be like, 'He called me and told me before it came out. Like, joke's on you, guys. We're fine.'" Consequently, "#TaylorSwiftisOverParty" became the top hashtag on Twitter. The hashtags "#KimExposedTaylorParty", "#TaylorSwiftIsASnake", and "#TaylorSwiftIsCanceled" also trended. Various media criticized, trolled, and "cancelled" Swift. Many people commented the snake emoji on Swift's social media posts. Swift responded on Twitter, arguing that there was still no video showing her approving the line in which West called her a "bitch" and stating that the release of the trimmed videos was "character assassination" and did not tell the whole story. She also released a statement on Instagram which included the line, "I would very much like to be excluded from this narrative, one that I have never asked to be a part of, since 2009." That line would go on to become a meme.

Ten days later, on July 27, 2016, West appeared at a Drake concert to perform their collaborative song "Pop Style". During the performance, West told the crowd "I'm so glad my wife has Snapchat, 'cause now y'all can know the truth." On August 2, 2016, Justin Bieber posted a photo of himself, West, and Scooter Braun to Instagram with the caption "Taylor Swift what up." On August 28, 2016, at the 2016 MTV Video Music Awards, West said that he was not trying to "take down" Swift. The next day, he tweeted a photograph with half of Swift's 1989 cover and half of West's My Beautiful Dark Twisted Fantasy cover. In October 2016, an earlier version of "Famous" was leaked, featuring more controversial lyrics. Years later, the full video recording of the phone call was released, supporting Swift's claims, but the backlash caused Swift to step away from the spotlight for a year and avoid being seen by the press. Swift later stated that she felt that "canceling" someone could be interpreted as telling them "kill yourself."

==== Reputation ====
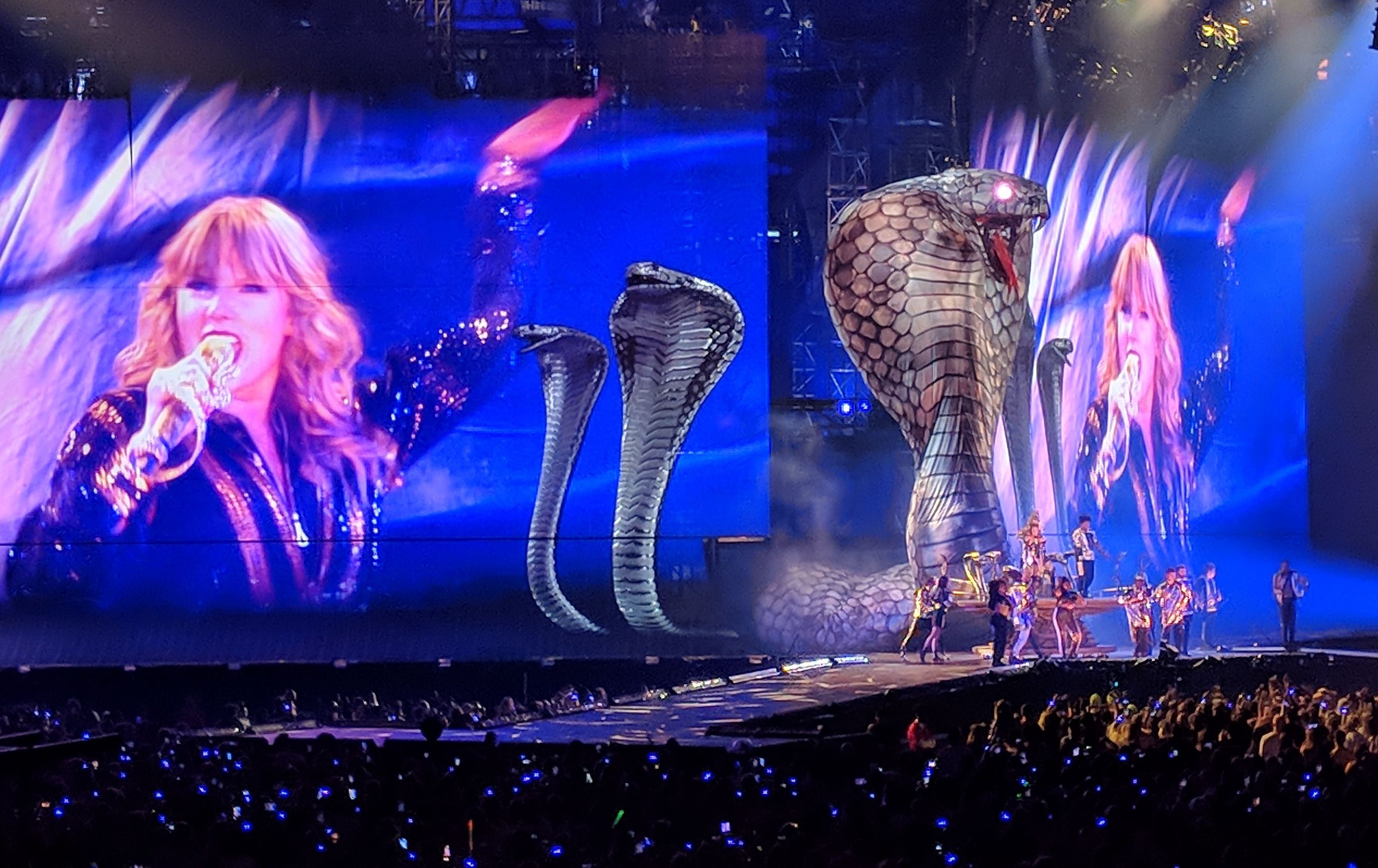
Swift's 63-foot inflatable snake on stage as she performs in Minneapolis for the Reputation Stadium Tour

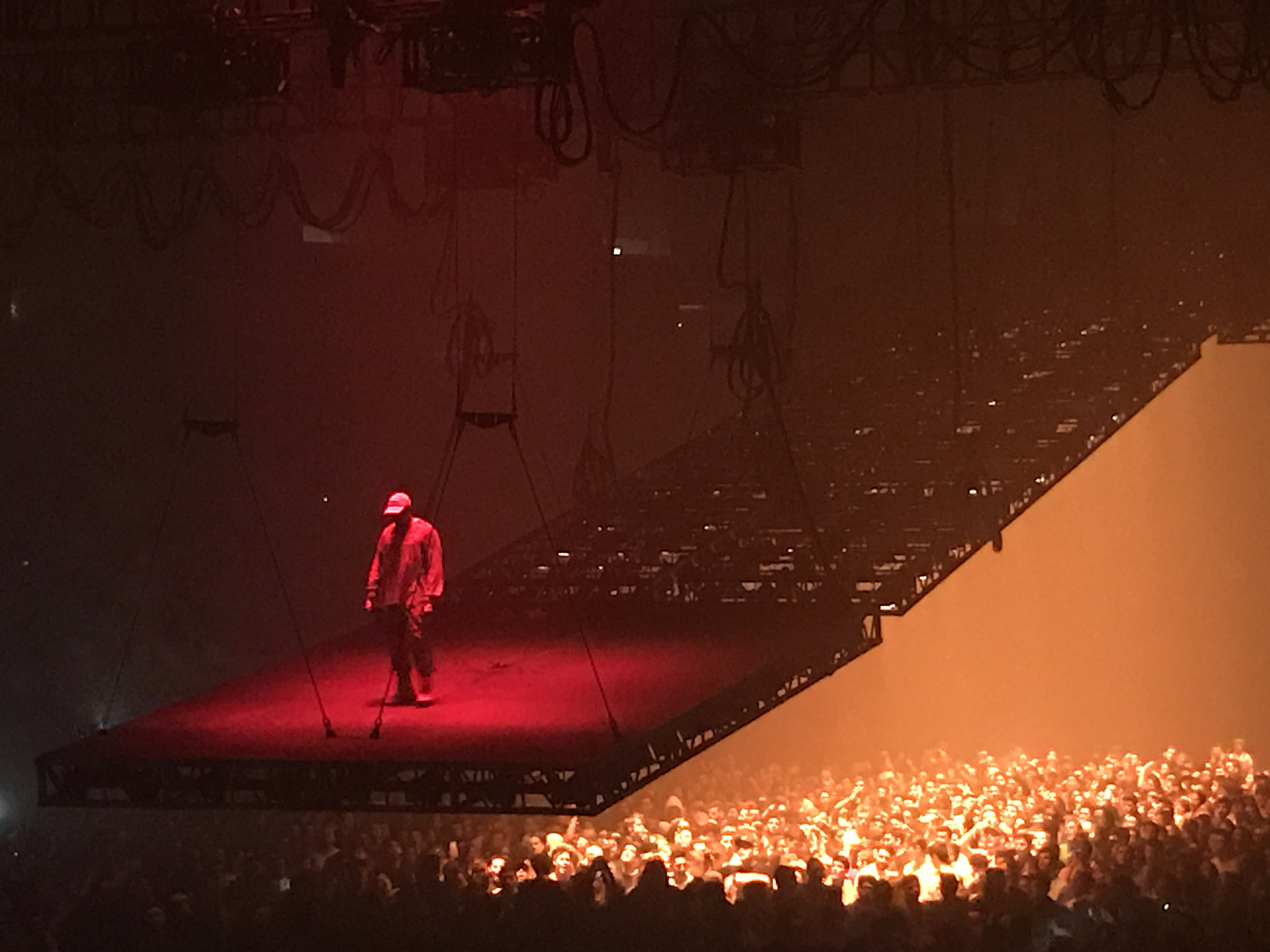
West performing for the Saint Pablo Tour in San Jose on his "tilted stage" that some believe is referenced in Swift's "Look What You Made Me Do"

On August 23, 2017, Swift announced the upcoming release of her sixth studio album, Reputation. The album was produced by Jack Antonoff, who has been vocal about his dislike of West throughout the years. Swift deleted all of the prior content on her Instagram account and released a series of videos depicting a CGI serpent, a reference to the snake emojis people had posted on Swift's social media following the release of the phone recordings. The next day, Swift released the single "Look What You Made Me Do". A lyric video was released simultaneously, featuring prominent snake imagery and depicting the chorus with an ouroboros. The song included the lyrics "The world moves on/ Another day another drama, drama/ But not for me, not for me/ All I think about is karma." The lyrics also referenced a "tilted stage"; Kanye had performed on a tilted stage during his 2016 Saint Pablo Tour.

The music video for "Look What You Made Me Do" premiered at the 2017 MTV Video Music Awards. The video had Swift wearing her 2009 VMAs outfit, referenced video editing and "playing the victim", and repeated the line "I would very much like to be excluded from this narrative" from her 2016 statement. In one scene, Swift is in a bathtub filled with diamonds. Some speculated that the bathtub scene referenced Kardashian's 2016 robbery, in which she was held at gunpoint at a hotel in Paris, France, and robbed of jewelry worth approximately $10 million. In another scene, Swift sits on a throne while a snake serves her tea. The song held the 2019 Guinness World Record for most-streamed track on Spotify in the first 24 hours, most streamed track in one week (female), and most streamed music video in the first 24 hours. "Look What You Made Me Do" won several accolades including, Best Western Song at the Hito Music Awards, the Pop Award at the BMI London Awards, and Award Winning Song and Publisher of the Year at the BMI Awards.

On November 10, 2017, Swift released the album, which included the track "This Is Why We Can't Have Nice Things". The song contained the lyrics "There I was giving you a second chance/ If only you weren't so shady/ But you stabbed me in the back while shaking my hand/ And therein lies the issue/ Friends don't try to trick you/ Get you on phone and mind-twist you." The lyrics referenced her January 2016 phone conversation with West and the idea that Swift had given West a second chance after the 2009 VMAs incident. Reputation's release date, November 10, 2017, was also the ten-year anniversary of the death of West's mom, Donda West. Some of West's fans felt that the release date was intentional, while others dismissed it as coincidence. Consequently, some of West's fans started an unsuccessful campaign attempting to prevent the album from charting. The album and its singles were a huge hit. Reputation remained atop the Billboard 200 for four weeks, and "Look What You Made Me Do" spent three weeks as the top single on the Billboard Hot 100.

Swift's 2018 Reputation Stadium Tour included a plethora of snake imagery, including a 63-foot inflatable snake she named "Karyn". Swift later said that making music about the 2016 controversy was the only way she was able to get through it.

==== Swift's masters dispute, Miss Americana, and the leak of the full phone conversation ====
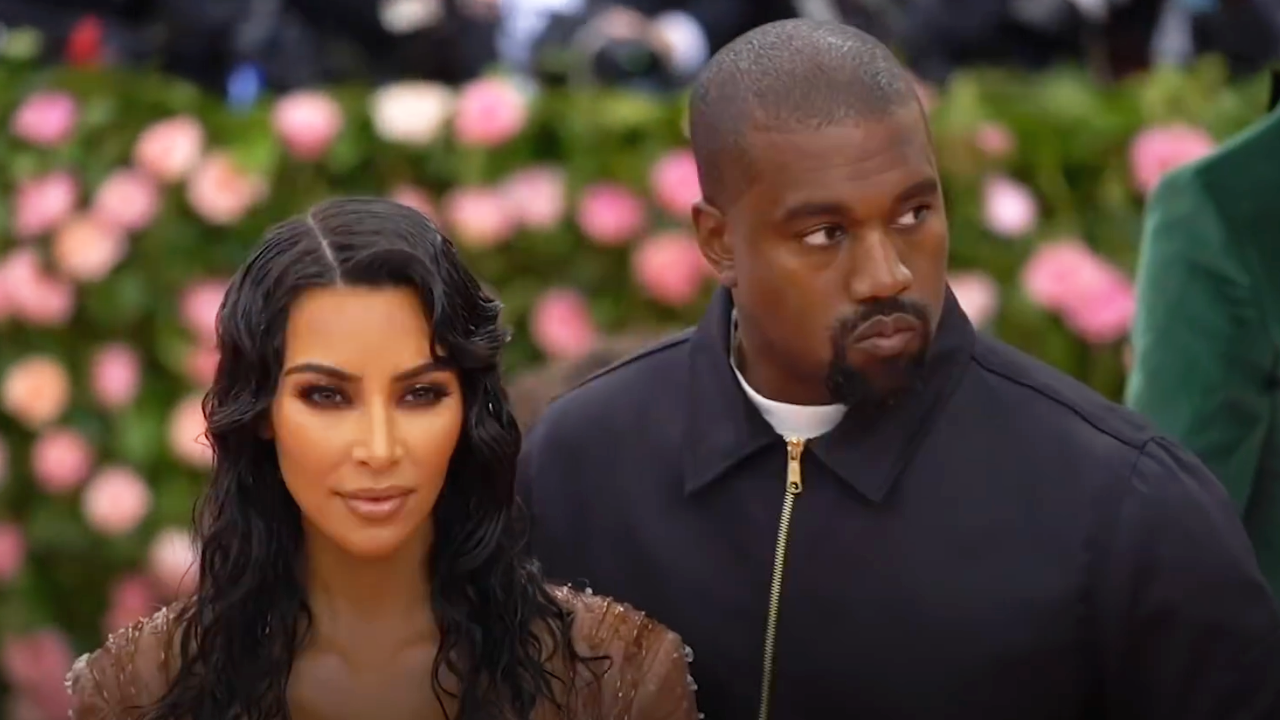
Kim Kardashian and Kanye West at the Met Gala in 2019

On January 15, 2019, Kardashian appeared on a Watch What Happens Live episode. During a segment called "Squash that Beef!", Andy Cohen asked Kardashian if she still had beef with Swift. Kardashian stated, "I feel like we've all moved on", and that she was over it. She also stated that she would rather be stuck in an elevator with Swift than Drake, with whom West was also in a publicized feud.

On June 30, 2019, Swift released a statement on Tumblr about her masters dispute with Big Machine Records and Scooter Braun. She stated that Braun's purchase of her masters brought her back to the "incessant, manipulative bullying" she'd received at Braun's hands for years, specifically mentioning West and Kardashian as well as Justin Bieber's 2016 Instagram post. Braun had represented West on-and-off, and Swift claimed Braun had supported West's bullying of Swift. Swift released her album Lover in August 2019. The album's deluxe version featured one of Swift's 2009 diary entries reflecting on the VMAs controversy.

In the October 2019 issue of Rolling Stone, Swift discussed the events leading up to the January 2016 phone call with West, claiming that her reaction to the lyrics in "Famous" was the result of a series of events between her and West. Swift also said that the song was the end for her and West, stating: "When I heard the song, I was like, 'I'm done with this.' If you want to be on bad terms, let's be on bad terms, but just be real about it." She elaborated, saying "I really don't want to talk about it anymore because I get worked up, and I don't want to just talk about negative shit all day."

On January 31, 2020, Swift released the documentary film Miss Americana, which covered her life and career, focusing on the time between the Reputation Stadium Tour and the release of her album Lover. In the documentary, Swift discussed the release of the trimmed video clips in 2016 and the impact it had on her life, including her year away from the spotlight.

On March 21, 2020, the full, unedited footage of the call leaked, proving Swift had not lied about giving West permission to call her a "bitch" in his song. In the video, West told Swift that he planned to release the song with the controversial lyric "To all my Southside niggas that know me best/ I feel like Taylor Swift might owe me sex." Swift appeared relieved, saying "I'm glad it's not mean, though [...] I thought it was going to be like, 'That stupid, dumb bitch.' But it's not. So I don't know." Swift then said she was not sure she would be willing to release the song on her Twitter account. The two never discussed West's plan to call Swift a "bitch", and the call was only twenty-five minutes, not an hour as West had previously stated. After the video leaked, "#KanyeWestisOverParty" became the top trending hashtag on Twitter.

On March 23, 2020, Swift briefly addressed the videos on her Instagram story, stating that the videos had been recorded illegally but revealed she had been telling the truth, and asking her supporters to donate to the World Health Organization and Feeding America in the wake of the COVID-19 pandemic. Kardashian responded to Swift's post with a long Twitter thread, claiming that Swift was "reignit[ing] an old exchange" and that Swift's post was "very self-serving given the suffering millions of real victims [of coronavirus] are facing right now." She also stated that West had recorded the phone call with Swift to "document his musical process and journey." Kardashian claimed that the only issue she had with Swift was that Swift had lied about discussing the song with West, and that the video she had posted to Snapchat in 2016 had proved the two had talked prior to the song's release. Kardashian denied editing the 2016 Snapchat videos, asserting that Swift had manipulated the truth. This resulted in the trending hashtag "#KimKardashianisOverParty". Swift's publicist responded on Twitter by reposting her 2016 original statement and saying that "when you take parts out, that's editing." Khloe Kardashian supported her sister by tweeting "Kim is my fucking lawyer for life!!!!!! My sister AND my lawyer."

In August 2020, West posted a series of tweets, including one that said, "Not gonna use a snake emoji cause you know why... I'm not sure if Christians are allowed to use snake emoji". Some of Swift's fans thought it may be a reference to Swift, as the snake emoji was previously used by Kardashian when she indirectly called Swift a "snake".

=== 2021–present: "Carnival", "Thank You Aimee", and "Lifestyle" ===
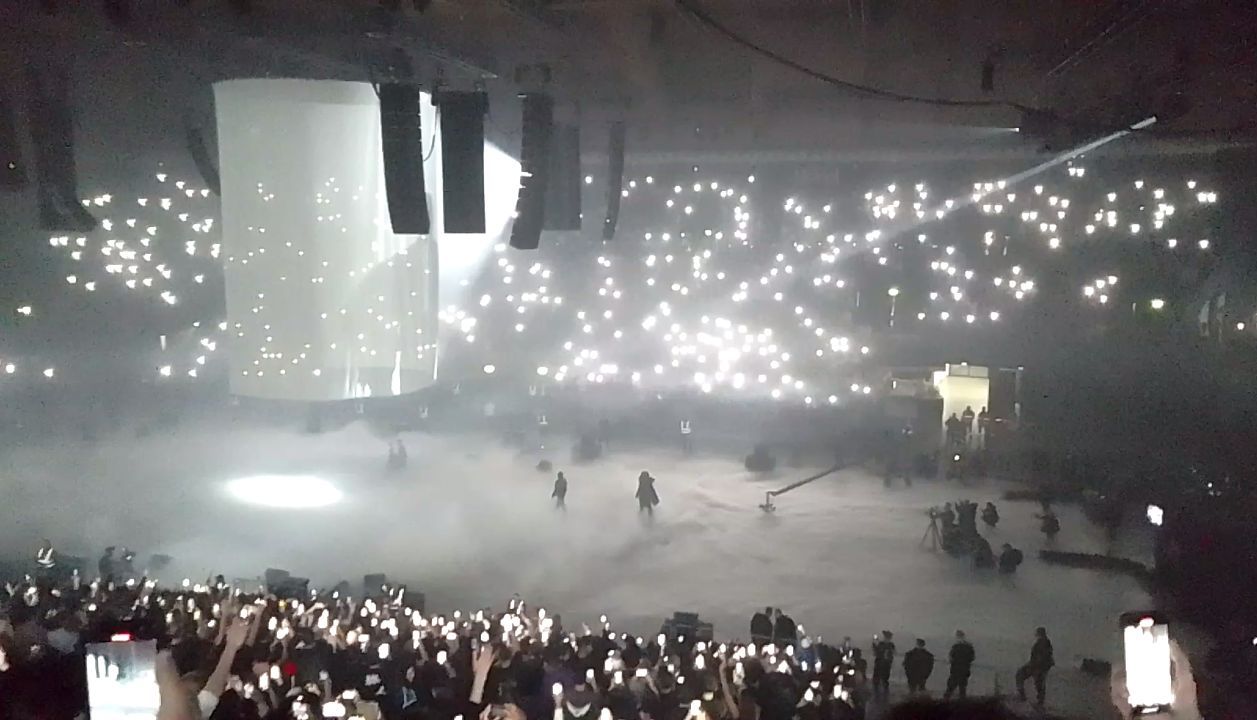
A 2024 listening release party in Bologna, Italy, for Vultures 1, West's first collaborative album with Ty Dolla Sign

On December 6, 2023, Swift was named Time's Person of the Year. In her interview, she reflected on her feud with West and Kardashian. She stated, "That took me down psychologically to a place I've never been before", discussing that she did not leave her rental house for a year and that she was afraid to get on phone calls. She also said that the incident had led her to push people away due to trust issues.

On February 9, 2024, West released the single "Carnival" off his album Vultures 1, which contained lyrics about Swift. The album was a collaboration with Ty Dolla Sign, under the hip-hop superduo name ¥$, and the single centers on the topic of oral sex. West raps, "Why she say she sucked my dick? (Ha)/ Then she say she ain't sucked my dick (Ha)/ She gon' take it up the ass (Ha)/ like a ventriloquist (Ha)/ I mean since Taylor Swift (Ha)/ Since I had the Rollie on the wrist (Ha)/ I'm the new Jesus, bitch (Ha)/ I turn water to Chris' (Ha)". Rich the Kid and Playboi Carti were also featured on the song. The song was met with intense criticism from Swift's fans due to its sexual nature and the fact that Swift was mentioned alongside several alleged sex offenders, including Bill Cosby and Puff Daddy. Swift's fans organized an attempt online to prevent West from topping the Billboard Hot 100 with "Carnival", encouraging streaming of Beyoncé's "Texas Hold 'Em". West responded by claiming that he was on Swift's side during the masters controversy and that he was neither an enemy nor friend of Swift's fans. "Carnival" eventually charted atop the Hot 100 in March 2024.

On April 19, 2024, Swift released her album The Tortured Poets Department: The Anthology, which featured the song "Thank You Aimee", largely believed to be a diss track about Kim Kardashian. The song was stylized as "thanK you aIMee" on the album's tracklist, with the capitalization of the letters spelling out "KIM". The song contains the lyrics "And in your mind, you never beat my spirit black and blue/ I don't think you've changed much/ And so I changed your name, and any real defining clues/ And one day, your kid comes home singin'/ A song that only us two is gonna know is about you." The lyrics are believed to reference a TikTok video posted by Kardashian's and West's daughter, North West, in which Kardashian and her daughter dance to Swift's 2014 song "Shake It Off". On August 19, 2024, Swift released a live recording of a mashup of "Mean" and "Thank You Aimee" from the Eras Tour. The track was stylized, "thank You aimEe (Mean – Live from London)", with the capitalized letters spelling "YE," West's legal name since 2021. After the song's release, People reported that Kardashian was over the feud and wanted Swift to move on.

Some also believe the song "Cassandra" from The Anthology is about Kardashian due to its references to snakes and lying. The lyrics of "Cassandra" state, "So, they killed Cassandra first 'cause she feared the worst/ And tried to tell the town/ So, they filled my cell with snakes, I regret to say/ Do you believe me now?"

On August 3, 2024, West and Ty Dolla Sign released the album Vultures 2, again under the collaborative artist name ¥$. One song, "Lifestyle", features a verse from Lil Wayne, in which he name-checks Swift and her boyfriend, Travis Kelce, stating, "I twist my Taylor spliffs tight at the end like Travis Kelce." In February 2025, West made Swift the sole person he followed on Instagram. In April 2025, in a series of subsequently deleted tweets, West claimed that Harry Styles and Justin Bieber "fucked Taylor swift from both sides" and stated "IM MAD I HAVENT FUCKED TAYLOR SWIFT... YET."

== Commentary ==
West has been supported by the Kardashian family, Ty Dolla Sign, Justin Bieber, Scooter Braun, Charlamagne Tha God, Kenneth Ehrlich, Lil Wayne, Rich the Kid, and Playboi Carti. (Note: Support for West: Kim Kardashian; Khloe Kardashian; Ty Dolla Sign; Lil Wayne; Justin Bieber; Scooter Braun; Rich the Kid; Playboi Carti; Charlamagne Tha God; Kenneth Ehrlich) Swift has been supported by Jack Antonoff, Austin Swift, Joe Alwyn, Selena Gomez, Gigi Hadid, Karlie Kloss, Lena Dunham, Jaime King, Taylor Lautner, Travis Kelce, and Dave Portnoy. (Note: Support for Swift: Jack Antonoff; Selena Gomez; Austin Swift; Gigi Hadid; Karlie Kloss; Jaime King; Lena Dunham; Joe Alwyn; Taylor Lautner; Travis Kelce; Dave Portnoy)

After the 2009 VMAs incident, the public was largely critical of West, with then-US President Barack Obama calling West a "jackass" and other celebrities condemning West's actions, including Hayley Williams, Adam Lambert, and Donald Trump. In 2016, after the release of "Famous" and the trimmed phone call recordings, public opinion swayed in West's favor.

In 2018, the BBC called the feud "music's most notorious on-off feud", and in 2025, Billboard called the feud "one of the most notorious feuds in the music industry." Vulture writer Nate Jones pinpointed Swift's overexposure during the Red and 1989 album cycles as the reason why the media easily "turned against" her in 2016, such as an opinion piece from Vice's Grace Medford that attributed Swift's later success to her "vilifying" West. After the full phone recording was released in 2020, media outlets began praising Swift for standing her ground. Shaad D'Souza of The Guardian wrote in 2023 that Swift had become "immune to hate" and re-established herself as the world's favorite popstar.

== Songs ==
List of songs involved in the feud in chronological order
| Date | Artist | Song title | Hot 100 Peak | Album | Content summary |
|---|---|---|---|---|---|
| September 12, 2010 (Note: "Innocent" premiered on September 12, 2010, at the 2010 MTV Video Music Awards, and was subsequently released as part of Speak Now on October 25, 2010.) | Taylor Swift | "Innocent" | 27 | Speak Now | Swift tells West that it is okay that he is "32 and still growing up now". |
| October 23, 2010 (Note: "See Me Again" leaked online on October 23, 2010.) | Kanye West | "See Me Again" | —N/a | Unreleased; intended for My Beautiful Dark Twisted Fantasy | West discusses the aftermath of the VMAs incident with vocals heavily processed through Auto-Tune. |
| February 9, 2016 (Note: "Famous" premiered on February 9, 2016, at a Yeezy fashion show, and was subsequently released as part of The Life of Pablo on February 14, 2016.) | Kanye West | "Famous" | 34 | The Life of Pablo | West calls Swift a "bitch" and claims that he made her famous. |
| August 24, 2017 | Taylor Swift | "Look What You Made Me Do" | 1 | Reputation | Interpreted as Swift's reference to West and Kardashian's phone call. |
| November 10, 2017 | Taylor Swift | "This Is Why We Can't Have Nice Things" | —N/a | Reputation | Interpreted as Swift's reference to West and Kardashian's phone call. |
| November 10, 2017 | Taylor Swift | "I Did Something Bad" | —N/a | Reputation | Interpreted as referencing the feud, especially following the 2025 lyric change "If he calls me a bitch, then he had it coming" |
| February 9, 2024 | Kanye West, Ty Dolla Sign, Rich the Kid, and Playboi Carti | "Carnival" | 1 | Vultures 1 | West raps about Swift in a suggestive nature, also mentioning sex offenders such as Bill Cosby. |
| April 19, 2024 | Taylor Swift | "Thank You Aimee" | 23 | The Tortured Poets Department: The Anthology | Interpreted as Swift's diss at West and Kardashian. |
| August 3, 2024 | Kanye West, Ty Dolla Sign, Lil Wayne | "Lifestyle" | —N/a | Vultures 2 | Lil Wayne name-drops Swift and her boyfriend Travis Kelce. |
