= Thank You Aimee =

2024 song by Taylor Swift

Song by Taylor Swift

from the album The Tortured Poets Department: The Anthology
- Released: April 19, 2024
- Studio: Long Pond (Hudson Valley); Sharp Sonic (Los Angeles)
- Genre: Country; folk; folk-pop
- Length: 4:23
- Label: Republic
- Songwriters: Taylor Swift; Aaron Dessner
- Producers: Taylor Swift; Aaron Dessner; Jack Antonoff

Lyric video
- "Thank You Aimee" on YouTube

"Thank You Aimee" (stylized as "thanK you aIMee" or "thank You aimEe") is a song by the American singer-songwriter Taylor Swift, from the double album edition of her eleventh studio album, The Tortured Poets Department: The Anthology (2024). Swift and Aaron Dessner wrote the track, and the two produced it with Jack Antonoff. A country, folk, and folk-pop track instrumented by guitar strums, its lyrics are about dealing with a high-school bully.

Due to the lyrical content and the stylizations of the title, some media publications interpreted "Thank You Aimee" as a diss track towards Kim Kardashian or Kanye West; several commentaries opined that it was unnecessary for Swift to revive a feud that had happened a long time prior. "Thank You Aimee" peaked at number 29 on the Billboard Global 200 and charted in Australia, Canada, New Zealand, Portugal, and the United States. Swift performed the song in a mashup with her track "Mean" (2010) at the London stop of her Eras Tour in June 2024.

== Background and release ==
Taylor Swift released the standard edition of The Tortured Poets Department on April 19, 2024, containing sixteen tracks and four different bonus tracks among different vinyl releases. Two hours after release, she surprise-released fifteen more tracks as a double album titled The Tortured Poets Department: The Anthology, which included the song "Thank You Aimee" as the 24th track. The title on the original album is stylized "thanK you aIMee". On June 22, 2024, Swift performed it as part of a mashup with her track "Mean" (2010) at the London stop of the Eras Tour. On August 15, 2024, this live performance was made available for download as part of a limited-time edition of The Tortured Poets Department on Swift's online store. On this edition, the song is stylized as "thank You aimEe".

== Composition and lyrical interpretations ==
"Thank You Aimee" is a country, folk, and folk-pop track with country pop stylings, instrumented by guitar strums. The song is written in the key of G major in common time with a tempo of 96 beats per minute. Swift's lead vocals range from G_{3} to C_{5}.

The lyrics of "Thank You Aimee" are directed towards Aimee, a character described as an old high-school bully. In the third verse, Swift's character thanks Aimee, telling her that even though she "wrote a thousand songs that you find uncool", she "built a legacy which you can't undo", adding that "there wouldn't be this, if there hadn't been you". In the bridge, Swift's character criticizes Aimee's lack of development ("I don't think you've changed much. And so I changed your name, and any real defining clues") and implies that "Aimee" is a fake name: "A song that only us two is gonna know is about you".

Many media publications speculated that "Thank You Aimee" was a diss track directed at the media personality Kim Kardashian due to the song's capitalized letters spelling "Kim" and its lyrical content. The limited-time acoustic version's capitalization spelling "Ye" lead to interpretations that the track was also targeted at the rapper Kanye West, also known as Ye. Swift had a publicized feud with Kardashian and West, formerly husband and wife, over his 2016 single "Famous", in which West claimed he made Swift famous; Swift considered the lyrics of the song misogynistic. Some critics thought that it was unnecessary for Swift to relive a long-gone feud.

== Commercial performance ==
Following the release of The Tortured Poets Department: The Anthology, "Thank You Aimee" debuted and peaked at number 23 on the US Billboard Hot 100. In Australia, it reached number 28 on the ARIA Singles Chart and made her the artist with the most entries in a single week, with 29. Elsewhere, "Thank You Aimee" debuted and peaked at number 29 on the Billboard Global 200 and charted within the countries of Canada (25), New Zealand (29), and Portugal (97). The song also reached the United Kingdom's streaming and sales charts with respective peaks of number 55 and number 33, Sweden's Heatseeker chart at number two, and Greece's International Top 100 Digital Singles chart at number 77.

== Credits ==
Adapted from the liner notes of The Tortured Poets Department: The Anthology

=== Studios ===
- Recorded Long Pond Studios, Hudson Valley and Sharp Sonic Studios, Los Angeles
- Bryce Dessner's orchestration recorded in Biarritz
- Aaron Dessner's performance recorded Long Pond Studios, Hudson Valley
- Glenn Kotche's performance recorded at Narwhal Studios, Chicago
- Thomas Bartlett's performance recorded at the Dwelling, New York City
- London Contemporary Orchestra's performance recorded at AIR Studios, London
- Mixed at Mixstar Studios, Virginia Beach, Virginia
- Mastered at Sterling Sound, Edgewater, New Jersey
- Mastered for vinyl at Sterling Sound, Nashville, Tennessee

=== Personnel ===
Technical

- Taylor Swift – songwriter, producer
- Jack Antonoff – producer, recording, programming
- Aaron Dessner – producer, songwriter, programming
- Serban Ghenea – mixing
- Bryce Bordone – engineer
- Jonathan Low – recording
- Bella Blasko – recording
- Oli Jacobs – recording
- Laura Sisk – recording
- Jozef Caldwell – assistant engineer, recording
- Maryam Qudus – recording
- Thomas Bartlett – recording
- Jeremy Murphy – recording
- Laura Beck – assistant engineer
- Randy Merrill – mastering
- Ryan Smith – mastering for vinyl
- London Contemporary Orchestra
  - Digital recordist – Gianluca Massimo
  - Copyist – Tristan Noon
  - Recording projects manager – Meg Monteith
  - Orchestra manager – Amy-Elisabeth Hinds

Musicians

- Taylor Swift – vocals
- Jack Antonoff – cello, percussion, drums, electric guitar, background vocals
- Aaron Dessner – acoustic guitar, banjo, bass synth, drum machine programming, keyboard, mandolin, percussion, synthesizers
- Bryce Dessner – orchestration
- Thomas Bartlett – keyboards, piano, synthesizers
- Glenn Kotche – drums, percussion
- London Contemporary Orchestra
  - Conductor – Robert Ames
  - First violin – Galya Bisengalieva (sololist and leader), Eloisa-Fleur Thom, Sophie Mather, Marriane Haynes, Alicia Berendse, Anna de Bruin, Akiko Ishikawa, Nicole Crespo O'Donoghue
  - Second violin – Emily Holland, Kirsty Mangan, Cara Laskaris, Ronald Long, Dan Oates, Iona Allan
  - Viola – Nicholas Bootiman, Matthew Kettle, Elisa Bergersen, Morgan Goff
  - Cello – Brian O'Kane, Reinoud Ford, Max Ruisi, Abi Hyde-Smith
  - Double bass – Dave Brown, Chris Kelly, Sophie Roper
  - French horn – David McQueen, Paul Cott, Jonathan Farey
  - Percussion – George Barton

== Charts ==
Chart performance
Chart (2024)	Peak position
Australia (ARIA)	28
Canada Hot 100 (Billboard)	25
Global 200 (Billboard)	29
Greece International (IFPI)	77
New Zealand (Recorded Music NZ)	29
Portugal (AFP)	97
Sweden Heatseeker (Sverigetopplistan)	2
UK Singles Sales (OCC)	55
UK Streaming (OCC)	33
US Billboard Hot 100	23

== Certifications ==
Certifications for "Thank You Aimee"
Region	Certification	Certified units/sales
Australia (ARIA)	Gold	35,000^{‡}
Brazil (Pro-Música Brasil)	Gold	20,000^{‡}
^{‡} Sales+streaming figures based on certification alone.
