= King Mellow Yellow =

Jamaican Dancehall DJ

- Also known as: The Yellow Hands
- Origin: Jamaica
- Genres: Reggae, dancehall
- Occupations: Musician, songwriter
- Years active: 1982–present
- Labels: Jamrock

King Mellow Yellow (born in Kingston, Jamaica) is a Jamaican Dancehall DJ. Being one of three popular albino DJs in the 1980s (Yellowman, Purpleman and King Mellow Yellow), in song, he often referred to himself as "The Yellow Hands".

== Career ==
In 1981, King Mellow Yellow began recording his first album. It released one year later in 1982 in Jamaica on the Jamrock label. Later that year, he released King Mellow Yellow Meet Yellowman, a clash album with another albino DJ Yellowman. In 1983 and 1984, Mellow Yellow released more singles with other artists and by himself. Some of those artists include Sammy Dread and Fathead.

== 12" Discos ==
Name	Year	Label
Butter Move	1983	Entertainment
Dread Buffalo Soldier	198X	Jamrock
Herpes Doctor	198X	Jamrock
Sanitation	1983	Black Fruit
Sitting on the Ritz	1983	Entertainment
Telephone Man (w/ Sammy Dread)	1984	Brown's Music Inc.
That's The Sound (w/ Fathead)	1984	Entertainment
Wha-Do-Dem-So (Dub Version of Above Song)	1984	Entertainment
