= Uprising Tour =

1980 concert tour by Bob Marley and the Wailers

- Tour by Bob Marley and the Wailers
- Poster to the concert in Munich, West Germany
- Associated album: Uprising
- Start date: 30 May 1980
- End date: 23 September 1980
- Legs: 2
- No. of shows: 33 in Europe; 5 in the United States; 38 in total

Bob Marley and the Wailers concert chronology
- Survival Tour (1979–80); Uprising Tour (1980); N/A

The Uprising Tour was a concert tour organised to support the album Uprising by Bob Marley and the Wailers. It was Marley's last tour and the biggest music tour of Europe in that year.

The tour started at the Hallenstadion in Zurich, Switzerland, where Marley performed for the first time, on 30 May 1980, and ended at the Stanley Theater in Pittsburgh, on 23 September 1980, which was Marley's last concert.

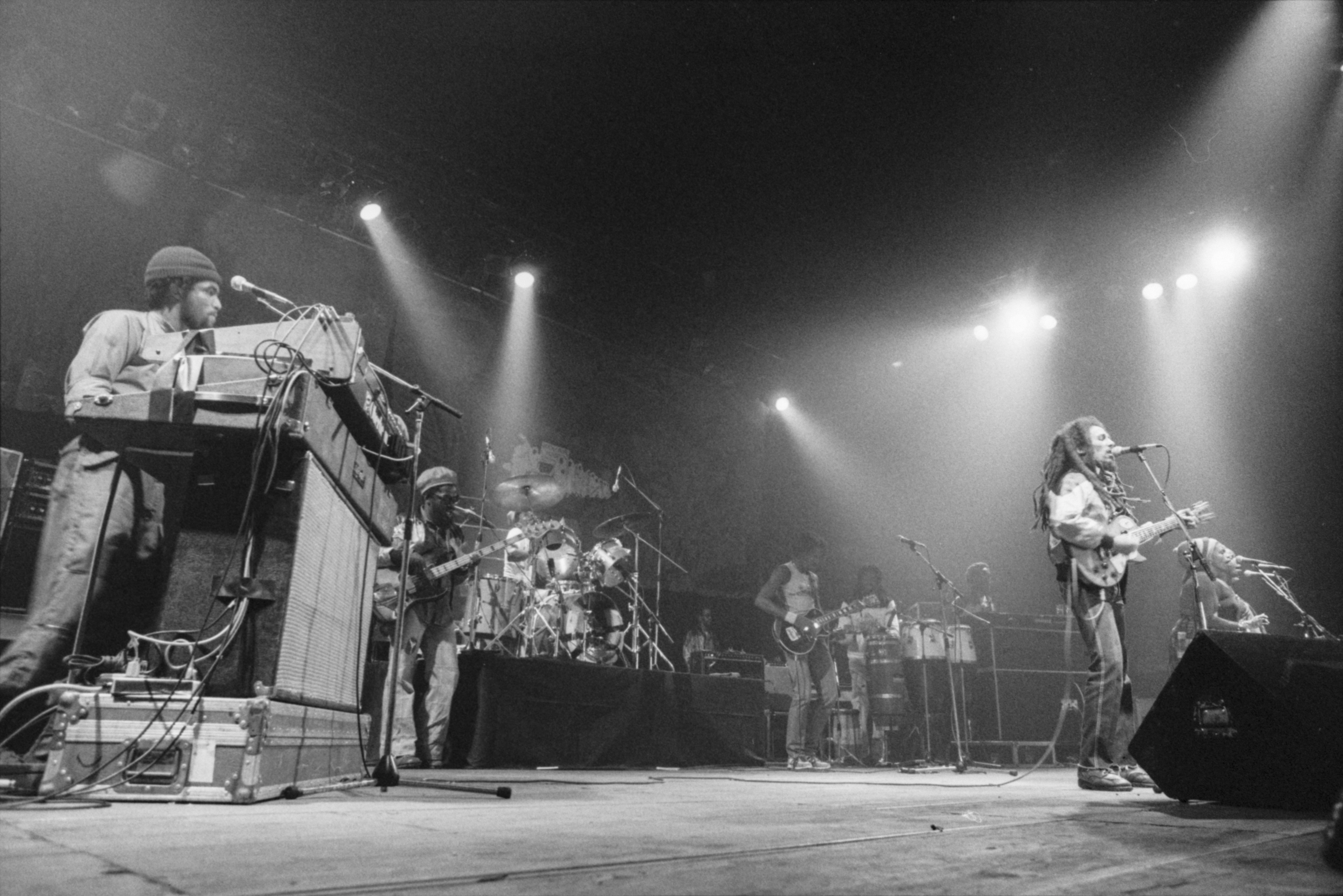
The tour's opening concert in Zürich

Two days prior to the Pittsburgh show, after playing two shows at the Madison Square Garden, Marley collapsed in Central Park while jogging, and was told to immediately cancel the U.S. leg of the tour, but he instead flew to Pittsburgh to perform one final performance. Marley went to a few treatment clinics in the United States, Boston, New York and Miami (maybe Mexico). Each place gave him only a month to live. Marley then left for West Germany to receive cancer treatment which eventually was not successful but prolonged his life 6 months more than any medical clinic in the United States predicted, as Marley died in May 1981.

The concert in Dortmund on 13 June was broadcast in the 1990s by German TV station WDR in their Rockpalast concert series. Numerous other performances from the Uprising Tour have also been taped on video. On 27 June, Marley performed in front of 120,000 people in the sold-out San Siro stadium in Milan. While on tour Marley performed for the first time in Switzerland, Italy, Ireland and Scotland.

== Set list ==
The standard set list of the tour mostly looked like the following:

1. "Natural Mystic"
2. "Positive Vibration"
3. "Revolution"
4. "I Shot the Sheriff"
5. "War" / "No More Trouble"
6. "No Woman, No Cry"
7. "Zimbabwe"
8. "Jamming"
9. "Zion Train"
10. "Exodus"
11. "Redemption Song"
12. "Work"
13. "Natty Dread"
14. "Could You Be Loved"
15. "Is This Love"
16. "Get Up, Stand Up"

As an introductory theme, the concerts often started with a version of the stalag riddim by Winston Riley, with keyboardist Tyrone Downie chanting "Marley!" over the riddim while Marley coming to the stage (therefore the intro is commonly called "Marley Chant" among fans). Most shows had a standard set list which closed with "Exodus", and an encore set which usually ended with "Get Up, Stand Up". There were also performances of an earlier song, "Trenchtown Rock", which is not featured on any of Marley's Island albums released at that time.

For the short U.S. leg of the tour Marley changed the set list to be similar to the one from the Kaya Tour in 1978: he dropped "Revolution" and "Natty Dread" and added songs like "Burnin' And Lootin'" or "Them Belly Full" at the beginning, or "The Heathen" and the "Running Away" / "Crazy Baldhead" medley in the middle of the set list.

From show to show sometimes an additional song was edged in the middle of the set list, like "Lively Up Yourself", "Kinky Reggae"-San Siro, Milan, Italy; "Roots, Rock, Reggae-San Siro, Milan, Italy and Le Bourget-Paris, France"; "Coming in From The Cold", "Bad Card"-Meehan Auditorium-Providence, Rhode Island, "Kaya"-San Siro, Milan-Italy; "Trenchtown Rock", "We And Them"-Meehan Auditorium, Providence, Rhode Island; "Three Little Birds"-Plaza de Toros, Barcelona-Spain; "Talkin' Blues" or "Forever Loving Jah"-Madison Square Garden, New York City, New York. Live performances of each of these songs happened very rarely during the tour.

== Tour dates ==
Date	City	Country	Venue	Notes
30 May 1980	Zurich	Switzerland	Hallenstadion	
1 June 1980	Munich	West Germany	Reitstadion	with Fleetwood Mac
3 June 1980	Grenoble	France	Palais des Sports	
4 June 1980	Dijon	France	Parc des Sports	
6 June 1980	Cologne	West Germany	Sporthalle	
7 June 1980	London	England	Crystal Palace Concert Bowl	
8 June 1980	Kaiserslautern	West Germany	Fritz-Walter-Stadion	with Fleetwood Mac
9 June 1980	Strasbourg	France	Hall Rhénus	
10 June 1980	Orléans	France	Parc des Expositions	
11 June 1980	Bordeaux	France	Exposition Hall	
13 June 1980	Dortmund	West Germany	Westfalenhallen	
14 June 1980	Hamburg	West Germany	Ernst-Merck-Halle	
16 June 1980	Drammen	Norway	Drammenshallen	
17 June 1980	Stockholm	Sweden	Gröna Lund	
18 June 1980	Copenhagen	Denmark	The Forum	
20 June 1980	West Berlin	West Germany	Waldbühne	
21 June 1980	Kassel	West Germany	Eissporthalle	
22 June 1980	Brussels	Belgium	Forest National	
23 June 1980	Rotterdam	Netherlands	Ahoy	
24 June 1980	Lille	France	Zénith de Lille	
26 June 1980	Toulon	France	Stade Mayol	
27 June 1980	Milan	Italy	Stadio Giuseppe Meazza	
28 June 1980	Turin	Italy	Stadio Comunale	
29 June 1980	Madrid	Spain	Estadio Román Valero	cancelled
30 June 1980	Barcelona	Spain	Plaza de Toros	
2 July 1980	Nantes	France	Parc des Expositions de la Beaujoire	
3 July 1980	Paris	France	Le Bourget	
6 July 1980	Dublin	Ireland	Dalymount Park	
8 July 1980	Brighton	England	Brighton Centre	
9 July 1980	Brighton	England	Brighton Centre	
10 July 1980	Glasgow	Scotland	The Apollo	
11 July 1980	Glasgow	Scotland	The Apollo	
12 July 1980	Queensferry	Wales	Deeside Leisure Centre	
13 July 1980	Stafford	England	New Bingley Hall	
16 September 1980	Boston	United States	JB Hynes Auditorium	
17 September 1980	Providence	United States	Meehan Auditorium	
19 September 1980	New York City	United States	Madison Square Garden	opener for The Commodores
20 September 1980	New York City	United States	Madison Square Garden	opener for The Commodores
23 September 1980	Pittsburgh	United States	Stanley Theater	
