= Jamaican (Bam Bam) =

Single by Hugel and Solto

from the album Twenty One
- Released: 7 November 2025
- Genre: Afro house; dance; house
- Length: 2:36
- Label: MoBlack; Make the Girls Dance
- Composers: Antoine Duthey; Cordel Dexter Burrell; Florent Hugel; François-Guillaume Muller; Ophlin Russell; Winston Delano Riley
- Lyricists: Cordel Dexter Burrell; Ophlin Russell; Winston Delano Riley
- Producers: Antoine Duthey; François-Guillaume Muller; Hugel

Hugel singles chronology
| "PYHU (Put Your Hands Up)" (2025) | "Jamaican (Bam Bam)" (2025) | "Free (You Got to Live)" (2025) |

"Jamaican (Bam Bam)" is a song by French producers Hugel and Solto, released by MoBlack Records and Make the Girls Dance Records on 7 November 2025. The Afro house, dance and house track is a reinterpretation of Sister Nancy's 1982 single "Bam Bam".

== Reception ==
The song has been noted as a dance and house reinterpretation of the 1982 single "Bam Bam" by Sister Nancy. Filled with "hypnotic drums", "textured basslines" and a "contagious groove", it was described as an Afro house and "high-energy club anthem" which belongs more to the underground scene of electronic music.

Commercially, the song reached the number one position on the Beatport's Afro House Chart and number two on the Beatport's overall ranking. The song went viral in the months following its release, particularly in South America.

== Charts ==
=== Weekly charts ===
Weekly chart performance for "Jamaican (Bam Bam)"
| Chart (2025–2026) | Peak position |
|---|---|
| Argentina Anglo Airplay (Monitor Latino) | 9 |
| Austria (Ö3 Austria Top 40) | 10 |
| Belgium (Ultratop 50 Flanders) | 28 |
| Belgium (Ultratop 50 Wallonia) | 4 |
| Bulgaria Airplay (PROPHON) | 5 |
| Canada Hot 100 (Billboard) | 55 |
| Central America Anglo Airplay (Monitor Latino) | 1 |
| Chile Airplay (Monitor Latino) | 11 |
| Colombia Anglo Airplay (Monitor Latino) | 1 |
| CIS Airplay (TopHit) | 21 |
| Costa Rica Airplay (FONOTICA) | 15 |
| Costa Rica Airplay (Monitor Latino) | 10 |
| Croatia International Airplay (Top lista) | 37 |
| Dominican Republic Anglo Airplay (Monitor Latino) | 1 |
| Ecuador Airplay (Monitor Latino) | 8 |
| El Salvador Airplay (ASAP EGC) | 6 |
| Estonia Airplay (TopHit) | 143 |
| France (SNEP) | 6 |
| Germany (GfK) | 12 |
| Germany Dance (GfK) | 1 |
| Global 200 (Billboard) | 36 |
| Global Dance Radio (Billboard/WARM) | 4 |
| Greece International (IFPI) | 1 |
| Guatemala Anglo Airplay (Monitor Latino) | 3 |
| Honduras Anglo Airplay (Monitor Latino) | 1 |
| Hungary (Dance Top 40) | 7 |
| India International (IMI) | 3 |
| Ireland (IRMA) | 63 |
| Israel (Mako Hitlist) | 31 |
| Italy (FIMI) | 17 |
| Italy Airplay (EarOne) | 56 |
| Latin America Anglo Airplay (Monitor Latino) | 1 |
| Latvia Airplay (TopHit) | 92 |
| Lebanon (Lebanese Top 20) | 17 |
| Lithuania (AGATA) | 57 |
| Lithuania Airplay (TopHit) | 30 |
| Luxembourg (Billboard) | 5 |
| Mexico Anglo Airplay (Monitor Latino) | 9 |
| Moldova Airplay (TopHit) | 24 |
| Netherlands (Dutch Top 40) | 2 |
| Netherlands (Single Top 100) | 5 |
| Nicaragua Anglo Airplay (Monitor Latino) | 1 |
| North Macedonia Airplay (Radiomonitor) | 9 |
| Panama Airplay (Monitor Latino) | 17 |
| Panama Streaming (PRODUCE) | 184 |
| Paraguay Airplay (Monitor Latino) | 2 |
| Peru Anglo Airplay (Monitor Latino) | 2 |
| Portugal (AFP) | 8 |
| Puerto Rico Anglo Airplay (Monitor Latino) | 10 |
| Romania (Billboard) | 10 |
| Romania Airplay (UPFR) | 4 |
| Romania Airplay (Media Forest) | 2 |
| Russia Airplay (TopHit) | 23 |
| Serbia Airplay (Radiomonitor) | 11 |
| Slovakia Airplay (ČNS IFPI) | 33 |
| Slovakia Singles Digital (ČNS IFPI) | 16 |
| Spain (Promusicae) | 40 |
| Spain Airplay (Promusicae) | 4 |
| Sweden (Sverigetopplistan) | 86 |
| Sweden Dance (Sverigetopplistan) | 6 |
| Switzerland (Schweizer Hitparade) | 5 |
| Turkey International Airplay (Radiomonitor Türkiye) | 1 |
| Ukraine Airplay (TopHit) | 38 |
| United Arab Emirates (IFPI) | 13 |
| UK Singles (Official Charts) | 34 |
| UK Dance (Official Charts) | 5 |
| UK Independent (Official Charts) | 47 |
| Uruguay Airplay (Monitor Latino) | 3 |
| US Hot Dance/Electronic Songs (Billboard) | 7 |
| US World Digital Song Sales (Billboard) | 2 |
| Venezuela Airplay (Monitor Latino) | 18 |

=== Monthly charts ===
Monthly chart performance for "Jamaican (Bam Bam)"
| Chart (2026) | Peak position |
|---|---|
| CIS Airplay (TopHit) | 25 |
| Lithuania Airplay (TopHit) | 68 |
| Moldova Airplay (TopHit) | 32 |
| Paraguay Airplay (SGP) | 25 |
| Romania Airplay (TopHit) | 12 |
| Russia Airplay (TopHit) | 30 |
| Ukraine Airplay (TopHit) | 69 |

== Certifications ==
Certifications for "Jamaican (Bam Bam)"
| Region | Certification | Certified units/sales |
|---|---|---|
| Belgium (BRMA) | Platinum | 40,000^{‡} |
| France (SNEP) | Diamond | 333,333^{‡} |
| Italy (FIMI) | Gold | 100,000^{‡} |
| Mexico (AMPROFON) | Gold | 70,000^{‡} |
| Portugal (AFP) | Platinum | 25,000^{‡} |
| Spain (Promusicae) | Platinum | 100,000^{‡} |
| United Kingdom (BPI) | Silver | 200,000^{‡} |
Streaming
| Greece (IFPI Greece) | Platinum | 2,000,000^{†} |
| Slovakia (ČNS IFPI) | Gold | 850,000^{†} |
^{‡} Sales+streaming figures based on certification alone.^{†} Streaming-only figures based on certification alone.
