= Macka Diamond =

- Also known as: Lady Charm; Lady Worries; Lady Mackerel
- Born: Charmaine Alvaree Munroe; 12 January 1971 (age 55); Kingston, Jamaica
- Genres: Dancehall
- Occupations: Singer; songwriter
- Years active: 2002’–present

Charmaine Alvaree Munroe (born 12 January 1971), known professionally as Macka Diamond, is a Jamaican recording artist, singer and songwriter.

== Early life and education ==
She was born in Kingston and raised in Portmore. Early in her career during the 1980s, she was known by the stage names Lady Charm, Lady Worries and Lady Mackerel.

== Career ==
She was influenced by female artists such as Sister Nancy, Lady Ann, Lady Junie and Lady G. With Junie's help, she got the chance to record "Don Girl". After a string of singles, including collaborations with Captain Barkey and Wickerman, she changed her name to Macka Diamond with her 2003 single "Tek Con", a protest record to Vybz Kartel's chauvinistic track "Tek Buddy". On 7 February 2012, she released the album Don't Disturb Mi, under Money Ooh Productions/VPAL.

Diamond performed the role of Kim, a nurse for a patient with dementia, in the film 3 to 11 written by Summer Angel, which premiered on 5 February 2022.

== Discography ==
=== Albums ===
- Money-O (LP, album, 2006), Greensleeves Records
- Don't Disturb Mi (2012), Money Ooh Productions/VPAL

=== Singles ===
- "Tekk Con" (7", 2003), G-String Production
- "Capleton / Macka Diamond – Mi Ready?" (2 versions, (2004), Big Jeans Records
- "Mi Ready" (7", 2004), Big Jeans Records
- "Macka Diamond / Danny English – Move Up Time / Nah Fight" (7", (2004), Juke Boxx Productions
- "Move Up Time / Nah Fight" (7", 2004), Juke Boxx Productions
- "Chase Money" (7", 2004), Mad House
- "Macka Diamond / Kip Rich* – Mr. Tecki Back / Baby Song" (7", 2004), Echo (2)
- "Done Already" (7", 2004), Echo (2)
- "Makka Diamond* / Chico (2) – Buddy / Never Yet" (7", 2004), Champagne International Records
- "Macka Diamond / Round Head – Try Wid Him / U Man Want Yu" (7", 2004), Don Corleon Records
- "Macka Diamond / Danny English – Stop Watch Me / All About Us" (7", single, 2004), Big Yard Music Group Ltd., Big Yard Music Group Ltd.
- "Blacker Ranks* / Macka Diamond – Your Life / Know Yu Fren" (7", 2004), Kings of Kings
- "Mr.Tecki Black / Military Riddim" (7", 2004), Birchill Records
- "Macka Diamond / Rdx – Comfortable / Get Krunk" (7", 2005), FIP Records
- "Gregory Isaacs & Macka Diamond – Number One" (7", 2005), Ball A Fire Muzik
- "Macka Diamond & Marlene (5) / Lady Empress – Money Oh / Bashment Girl" (7", 2005), South Rakkas Crew
- "Makka Diamond* & Vybz Kartel – Look Big" (7", 2005), Don Corleon Records
- "Hoolla Hoop" (2 versions, 2006), Hands & Heart
- "Hoolla Hoop" (7", 2006), Hands & Heart
- "Hoola Hoop" (12", promo, S/Sided, Red, 2007), Greensleeves Records
- "Angel (53) / Macka Diamond – Good Girl / Independent" (7", 2006), Reggae Republic
- "Gangster Wife" (7", 2007), Juke Boxx Productions
- "Macka Diamond / Zumjay – Nuff Cash / Pimpers Paradise" (7", 2007), Gravi-T Music
- "Queen Paula / Macka Diamond – Nuff Gal A Sleep Outa Road 2nite" (7", 2007), Blaque Warriahz Muzik
- "Money Money" (7", 2008), M Bass Productions
- "Makka Diamond* / Timberly – Dem A Talk / Matey" (7", 2008), Jam II Records
- "Mykal Rose* Feat. Mitch (3) & Cali P* / Macka Diamond – Mr. Collie (Rmx) / We're Flossing" (7", 2009), Food Palace Music
- "Mykal Rose* Feat. Mitch (3) & Cali P* / Macka Diamond – Mr. Collie (Rmx) / We're Flossing" (7", 2009), Food Palace Music
- "<Macka Diamond - Needle Eye" (2010) Yengeh Riddim - Blaqk Sheep Music / Loud Disturbance
- "Macka Diamond - Hot Like We" (2010) Kamasutra Riddim - Blaqk Sheep Music / Loud Disturbance
- "Macka Diamond Feat Mystic, Mad Michelle, Queen Lateesha, Mumzel, Zj Sparks - Too Much Bull" (2010) 90 Degrees Of Dancehall vol.1 - Blaqk Sheep Music / Loud Disturbance
- "Macka Diamond - Middle" (2016) Swahili Riddim - Blaqk Sheep Music

== Books ==
- The Real Gangster Wife
- Bun Him
- Naughty or Nice?
- Grown and Sexy
