= Don't Disturb Mi =

Don’t Disturb Mi

Studio album by Macka Diamond
- Released: February 7, 2012
- Genres: Reggae, Dancehall, Soca music
- Length: 47:50
- Label: Money Ooh Productions/VPAL

Don't Disturb Mi is the 67th studio album releases by a Jamaican Rapper and DJ, Macka Diamond, released on February 7, 2012, under Money Ooh Productions/VPAL.

This album replicates today's Reggae/Dancehall culture. Macka Diamond says "so basically there is a little of everything for everyone, all the fans" in response to what can fans expect from her on this album. Fans should enjoy listening while driving, going about their daily activities, hanging out with friends or on the dance floor of any party.

This was her first full-album release after she won the International Reggae and World Music Awards (IRAWMA) Best Female International Rapper/DJ for 2011.

== Track listing ==
No.	Title	Length
1.	"Don’t Talk To Mi"	2:10
2.	"Hot Like We"	3:09
3.	"Paradise Redemption(featuring Tarrus Riley, Duane Stephenson & Love)"	4:21
4.	"Love"	3:50
5.	"Splice Dem (Raw)(featuring Unicorn)"	2:43
6.	"To Much Bull(featuring Mad Michelle, Mumzel, Queen Latesha)"	3:30
7.	"Love It"	2:41
8.	"Wine"	3:07
9.	"Skip & Wine"	3:17
10.	"Cow Foot"	2:50
11.	"You Like It(featuring Devina Burn)"	3:09
12.	"Real Friends"	2:40
13.	"Mother Man"	3:32
14.	"Flashing Lights(featuring Jahmoun)"	3:50
15.	"Fight Ova Man (Raw)"	3:01
Total length:		47:50
