= Purpleman =

Jamaican musician (1962–2020)

Background information
- Also known as: Peter Yellow
- Born: 4 January 1962
- Origin: Waterhouse District, Kingston, Jamaica
- Died: 14 August 2020 (aged 58)
- Genres: Reggae, dancehall
- Occupations: Musician, songwriter, deejay
- Years active: 1979–2020

Purpleman, also known as Peter Yellow (born as Anthony Jones; 4 January 1962 – 19 August 2020) was a Jamaican dancehall deejay. Being one of three albino deejays in the 1980s (Yellowman, Purpleman, and King Mellow Yellow), he was originally given the name Peter Yellow before using the name Yellowman, and released an album under this name. The name Purpleman was given to him by Nicodemus.

== Biography ==
Purpleman deejayed with King Jammy's sound system, including performing at 'clashes' with other systems such as Youth Promotion, Arrows, Killamanjaro and Black Scorpio at the 'Shock of the Century' in 1985. Purpleman's first release was an album entitled Hot In 1982. He went on to record a series of albums shared with other deejays including Yellowman, Sister Nancy, and Papa Tollo. In 2014 he made a comeback with a new album entitled Home Once More.

== Death ==
Purpleman died on 14 August 2020 at the Kingston Public Hospital due to heart-related complications.

== Discography ==
=== Albums ===
- Hot (1982), Black Music/Sonic Sounds (as Peter Yellow)
- DJ Confrontation (1982), CF – with U Brown
- The Yellow, The Purple & The Nancy (1982), Greensleeves – with Yellowman, Fathead and Sister Nancy
- Purpleman Saves Papa Tollo in a Dancehall (1983), Vista Sounds – with Papa Tollo
- Laserbeam (1983), Enterprise (with Sister Candy)
- Confessions (1983), Vista Sounds – credited to Yellowman, probably for commercial purposes
- Showdown Vol. 5 (1982), Hitbound – with Yellowman and Fathead
- Home Once More (2014), VPAL Music
- Dancehall General (2017) J Island Records
- Confessions (2024), Burning Sounds

=== 7" singles ===
- "D&G" (1986)
- "Dem A Call Mi Name" (with Saramouche) (198?)
- "DJs Program" (199?)

=== 12" singles ===
- "A Fe We Jah" (197?) (*as Ranking Purple)
- "Water Pumpee" (198?)
- "Rose Marie" (198?)
- "Level Vibes Pumping" (1983)
- "Keep on Working" (198?) (with Cornell Campbell)
- "Get Me Mad" (1982)
- "Water Pumping" (1983)
- "Daddymix" (199?)
