= Liondub =

- Born: Erik Weiss; New York City, NY, U.S.
- Genres: Drum and bass; jungle; reggae; dancehall; hip hop; dubstep
- Occupations: Record producer; DJ
- Years active: 1991–Present
- Labels: Playaz; Propa Talent; Serial Killaz; Liondub International
- Website: bpmartists.com/portfolio-artist/liondub/

Erik Weiss (born 12 November 1973), better known by his stage name Liondub, is an American DJ, producer, and record label owner who specializes in jungle, drum and bass, reggae, dancehall, hip hop and dubstep.

== Career ==
=== 1991–2003 ===
Liondub began his music career in 1991, playing reggae and dub music in New York City. He was introduced to jungle music in 1995, and after a trip to London in 1998 he started playing jungle in his sets. Known for a unique blend of American hip hop, UK jungle and Jamaican reggae/dancehall, Liondub quickly became renowned for his exclusive dubplate driven sets. Voicing dubplates has played a large role in Liondub's success as he travels to Kingston, Jamaica regularly to record dubplates at studios such as Anchor, Tuff Gong, Exodus, Rooftop, and Mixing Lab for sound systems and producers worldwide. The success from his sets enabled Liondub to tour Europe and the United Kingdom extensively, including radio sets and interviews on Kiss 100, Kool FM, Rinse FM and Origin UK. He has played at numerous drum & bass festivals and events including Playaz at Fabric, Sub Dub in Leeds, Boomtown, Innovation in the Sun, Hospitality Bristol, Jungle Fever and Outlook Festival in Croatia. Liondub has performed alongside artists and DJs such as Sly & Robbie, Steel Pulse, Black Uhuru, Sister Nancy, Sizzla, Capleton, Buju Banton, Morgan Heritage, Damian Marley, Afrika Baambaata, Fugees, DJ Krush, DJ Hype, Andy C, Goldie, and more.

In New York, Liondub has held residencies at venues such as The Box, Tao Downtown, The Skylark, Miss Lilys, and the James Hotel, and is known for his Reggae Brunch parties at Cafe Noir in the Soho region of Manhattan from 2006 to 2012. He was a founding member and first DJ of the Everyday people brunch party alongside host Chef Roble and DJ Moma, and also worked at Halcyon the shop in Brooklyn where he curated the "Bless Up" Internet radio program that hosted international dubstep and drum & bass artists including Loefah, Pinch, Benny Page and various local acts.

In 2003, he became a member of Chopstick Dubplate with founders Jacky Murda & RCola, and in 2008 he started his own record label Liondub International, with Marcus Visionary, one of Toronto Canada's leading drum and bass DJs. During the years 2010–2012, Liondub remixed official tracks for various labels and artists including Johnny Osbourne, Elephant Man, Top Cat, Stevie Hyper D, Tenor Fly and Brother Culture. In 2013, Liondub was signed by DJ Hype to Playaz recordings with his track “Lift It Up” being released on The Flavours 6 EP. In 2014, Liondub was signed by Billy Daniel Bunter to the Music Mondays label and released the two-disc LP New York to London Link Up featuring tracks by Johnny Osbourne, Sugar Minott, Daddy Freddy and Blackout JA.

=== 2013–present ===
In 2013, Liondub was selected to be the first international radio presenter for Kool London, the longest-running jungle/drum and bass radio station in the world, a station which Billboard magazine referred to as the "leading jungle station" in a 1995 article about jungle music. In 2015, Liondub won the We Love Jungle Award for "Best Jungle Radio Show", and was nominated again in 2016 and 2017, while his label Liondub International was nominated for "Best Jungle Label" in 2016 and 2017 respectively.

From 2015 to 2017, Liondub collaborated with Marcus Visionary to release the Jungle to the World series featuring a wide variety of jungle/drum & bass and reggae artists from around the world. On volume 2, Liondub and Bluntskull remixed the 1993 classic "Put It On", originally released by Jamalski and Rocker-T on Capitol Records. On volume 3, Liondub released the song "Smugglers", featuring vocals performed by Rubi Dan as well as the collaborative work with Switzerland's Jungle Raiders and London based artist Deadly Hunta entitled "Cali". Also in 2016, Liondub presented and released MC Navigator's first full-length LP on the Liondub International label and Navigator subsequently won the Best Jungle MC award at the UK's national Drum & Bass awards.

In 2017, Liondub and Marcus Visionary created the music group Rumble, whose fifth release and full-length LP entitled Printa Riddim featured a remix of Steely & Clevie's seminal dancehall rhythm "Lion Attack". The LP featured vocal performances from artists such as I Octane, Demarco, Daddy Freddy, Ninja Kidd, Powerman and Suku Ward and the LP received a review in an article published in Jamaica's national entertainment tabloid The Jamaica Star. A single off the LP, "Uncontrollable" by Red Fox was premiered by David Rodigan on his BBC Radio 1Xtra show in December 2017.
