= Vincent Desiderio =

American realist painter

- Born: 1955 (age 70–71); Pennsylvania, US
- Education: Haverford College; Pennsylvania Academy of the Fine Arts; Accademia di Belle Arti di Firenze, Florence, Italy
- Known for: Realism
- Website: vincent-desiderio.com

Vincent Desiderio (born 1955) is an American realist painter. In 2005 he was on the teaching staff at the Pennsylvania Academy of the Fine Arts; he is a senior critic at the New York Academy of Art.

== Biography ==
Desiderio was born in 1955, in Pennsylvania. He studied at Haverford College in Haverford, Pennsylvania; at the Pennsylvania Academy of the Fine Arts in Philadelphia; and at the Accademia di Belle Arti in Florence, Italy. In 1984 he joined the P.S. 1 Contemporary Art Center in New York City.

Vincent Desiderio is the father of four children, Sam, Oscar, Ian, and Lilly, from his first wife, Gale. He is also the stepfather of two children, Azure and Blaze, from his second wife, Roxanne. Desiderio's eldest son, Sam, was born with Hydrocephalus in 1986. He suffered a stroke as a young child, further disabling him and serving as the inspiration for much of Vincent's work thereafter.

His work was shown at the Marlborough Gallery in New York in 2004, and is held by the Pennsylvania Academy of the Fine Arts.

Vincent's daughter Lilly is featured in his 2008 painting Lilly in a round chair.

Desiderio's painting Sleep was a source of inspiration for the music video "Famous" by Kanye West.
