= Famous (Kanye West song) =

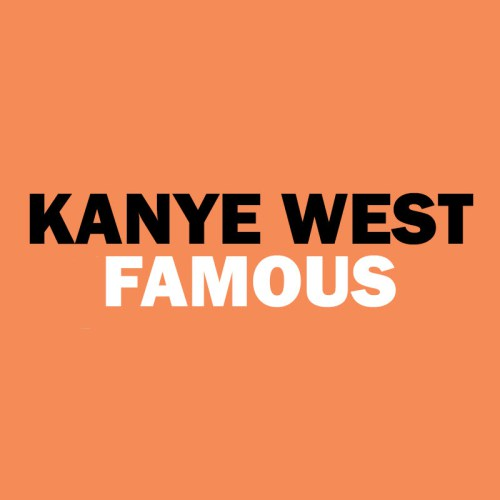

Single by Kanye West

from the album The Life of Pablo
- Released: March 28, 2016
- Recorded: January 7, 2014 – March 13, 2016
- Genre: Hip-hop
- Length: 3:14
- Label: GOOD; Def Jam
- Songwriters: Kanye West; Kejuan Muchita; Patrick Reynolds; Enzo Vita; Ross Birchard; Giampiero Scalamogna; Sergio Bardotti; Winston Riley; Jimmy Webb; Ernest Brown; Kasseem Dean; Mike Dean; Andrew Dawson; Noah Goldstein; Cydel Young; Chancelor Bennett; Nina Simone; Ophlin Russell; Luis Bacalov
- Producers: Kanye West; Havoc

Kanye West singles chronology
"One Man Can Change the World" (2015)	"Famous" (2016)	"Pop Style" (2016)

Rihanna singles chronology
"Work" (2016)	"Famous" (2016)	"Kiss It Better / Needed Me" (2016)

Music video
- "Famous" on YouTube

"Famous" is a song by American rapper Kanye West, produced and co-written by fellow American hip-hop artist/producer Havoc. It serves as the lead single from his seventh studio album, The Life of Pablo (2016). The song features vocals from Barbadian singer-songwriter Rihanna and ad-libs from American hip hop artist Swizz Beatz, and enlists samples of Jamaican singer Sister Nancy's song "Bam Bam" and "Do What You Gotta Do" by American singer Nina Simone. The single was serviced to US urban and rhythmic contemporary radio stations on March 28, 2016, and was confirmed for release three days before. Universal sent the song to Italian contemporary hit radio stations on April 15.

Upon its release, "Famous" was met with both critical acclaim and scrutiny for a controversial lyrical reference to American singer-songwriter Taylor Swift, partially in relation to West's interruption of her 2009 VMA acceptance speech. After West claimed to have obtained Swift's approval over the criticized lyric, Swift denied the claim, criticizing West and denouncing the lyric as misogynistic in a statement. Several months later, West's then-wife Kim Kardashian released a three-minute video capturing parts of a conversation between Swift and West in which Swift appears to approve a portion of the lyric. In 2020, a 25-minute uncut version of the video surfaced, establishing that West did not appear to tell Swift about the specific line ("I made that bitch famous") which she had objected to.

In June 2016, West released a music video for "Famous" depicting wax figures of himself, Taylor Swift, Kim Kardashian, George W. Bush, Donald Trump, Anna Wintour, Rihanna, Chris Brown, Ray J, Amber Rose, Caitlyn Jenner and Bill Cosby all sleeping naked in a shared bed. It was released to a polarized response. The wax figures used in the video were later exhibited as a sculpture. The song was nominated for Best Rap/Sung Performance and Best Rap Song at the 59th Annual Grammy Awards.

== Background and composition ==
In May 2016, Chance the Rapper shared a snippet of a demo version of the song during an interview with Zane Lowe of Beats 1 that featured a verse from him. "Famous" was originally slated to be released under the title of "Nina Chop", as it was called in West's handwritten notes, and include vocals from American musician Young Thug. In October 2016, another demo version leaked online, featuring two verses from Young Thug and him singing alongside the Nina Simone sample. Ab-libs were also provided by Young Thug for West's vocals, with the demo revealing more explicit lyrics about Taylor Swift from West and him insulting his ex-girlfriend, American model and actress Amber Rose. "Famous" features a segue from "braggadocious, bell-ringing hip-hop" into samples of Sister Nancy's dancehall song "Bam Bam" chopped up over the chord progression featured in Nina Simone's "Do What You Gotta Do". After the initial release of The Life of Pablo, "Famous" was among the several tracks to receive alterations in West's March 2016 update of the album; changes included a different mix and slightly altered lyrics. On August 6, 2020, rapper Rick Ross played a version with an unreleased verse from him during his Verzuz battle with 2 Chainz.

== Reception ==
=== Critical response ===
Chicago Tribune critic Greg Kot called the song "an example of just how brilliant and infuriating West can be at the same time", noting its controversial Swift-referencing lyric while going on to praise the production and Rihanna's guest vocals. Jayson Greene of Pitchfork wrote that the controversial lyric "feels like a piece of bathroom graffiti made to purposefully reignite the most racially-charged rivalry in 21st-century pop". The Guardian's Alexis Petridis described the song's position on The Life of Pablo as being "a flatly fantastic piece of music that may be the best thing on the album".

Time staff named "Famous" one of the best songs of the year 2016 and wrote of it that:

Kanye West is a genius musician and a world-class provocateur, and "Famous" is yet another piece of proof those two qualities are inextricably intertwined. He weaves The Life of Pablo's hardest-knocking beat, chords cribbed from Nina Simone, and Sister Nancy's reggae classic "Bam Bam" into a vibrant tapestry, and he uses all of that beauty to crack open his long-simmering spat with the biggest pop star on the planet. The court of public opinion won't ever reach a verdict on Taylor [Swift] v. Kanye — did she consent to being mentioned? Did she double-cross Kanye? At least we can all agree that "Famous" captures West in all of his complicated, vital glory.

=== Accolades ===
The track was positioned at number 10 on Time's list of 2016's best songs. Slant named it the second best single of 2016. German magazine Juice named it the seventh best international rap song of 2016.

The song received Grammy nominations for Best Rap/Sung Performance and Best Rap Song at the 59th Annual Grammy Awards in 2017, but ended up losing both to "Hotline Bling" by Canadian rapper and singer Drake.

== Controversy ==
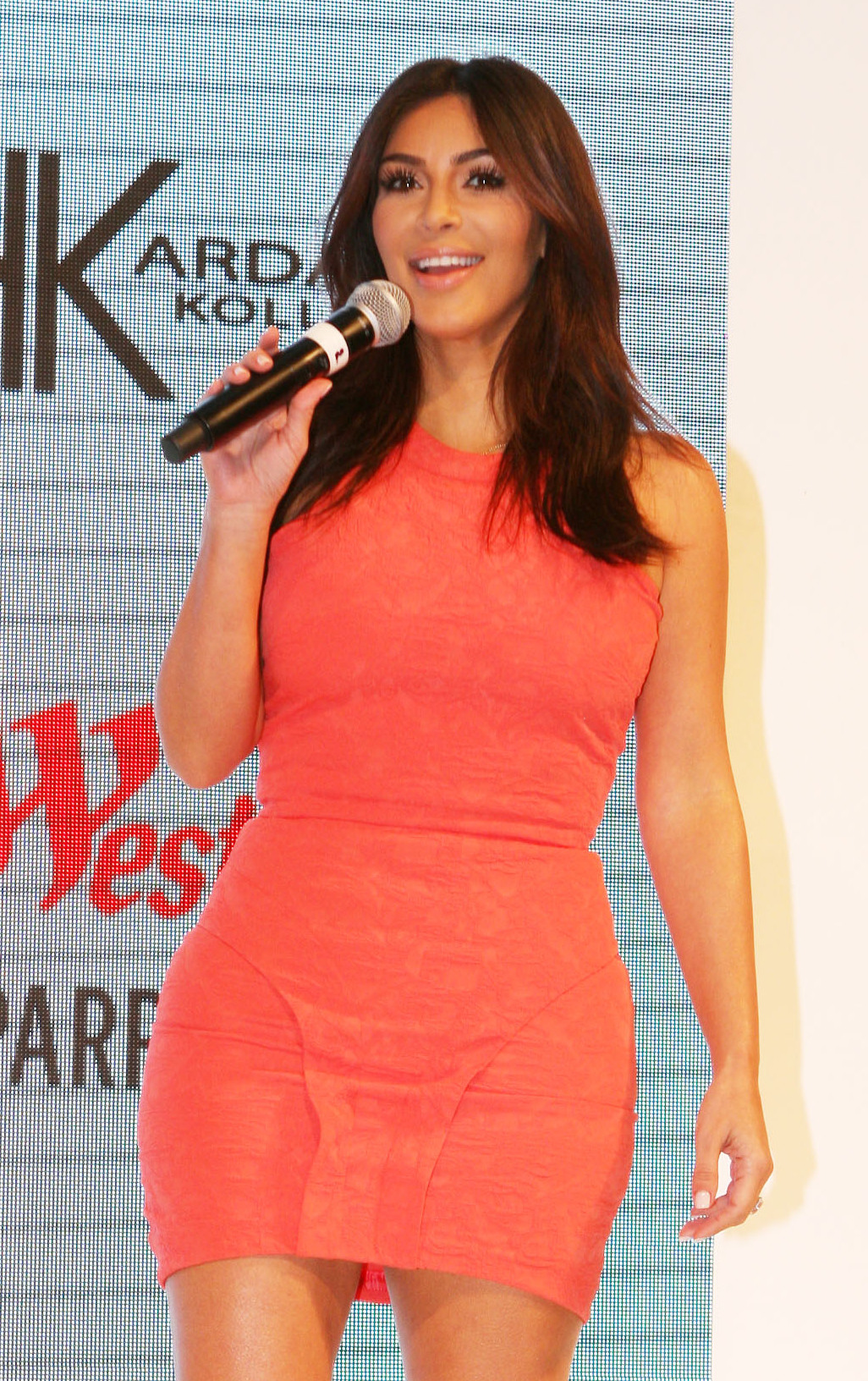
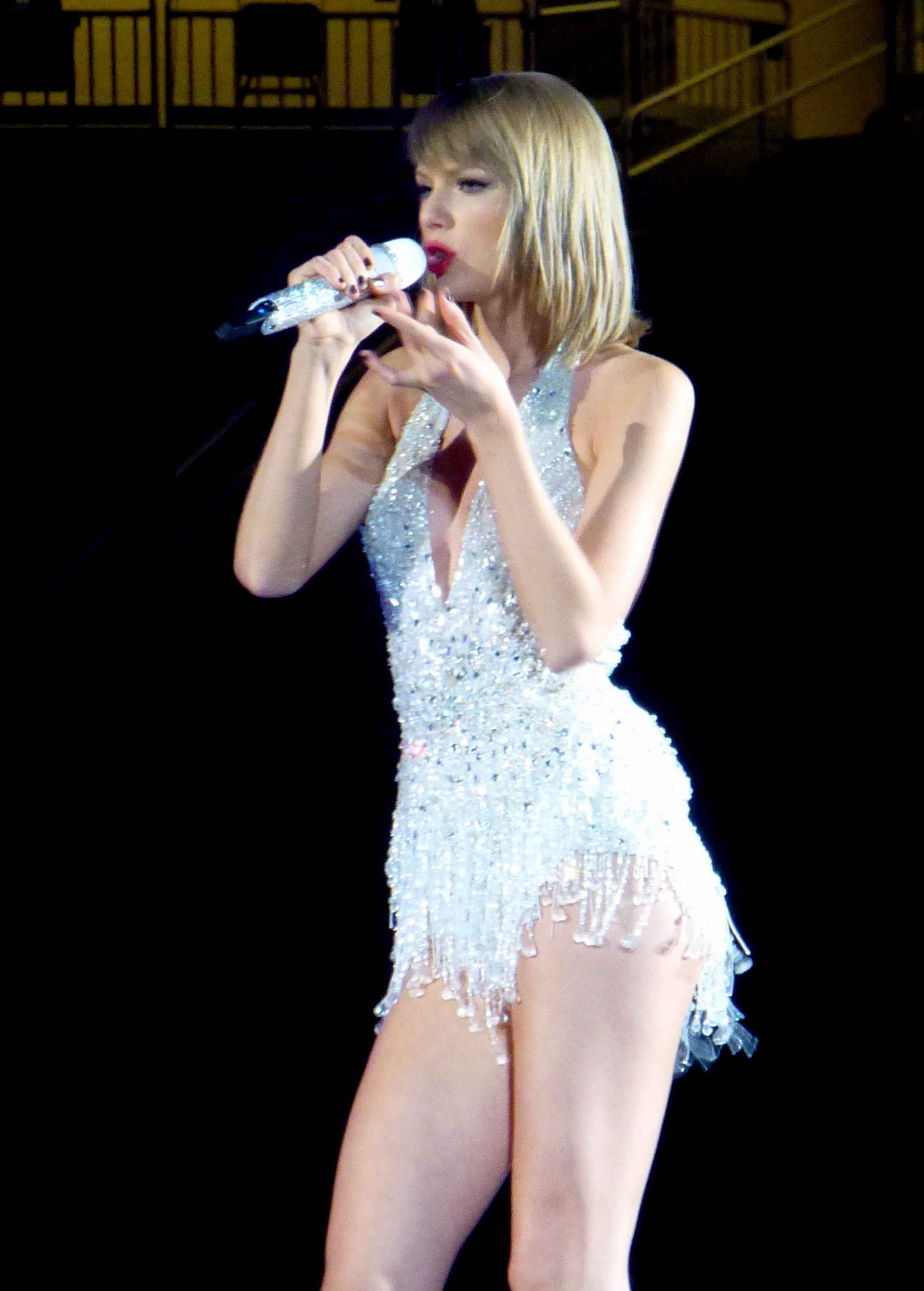
In July 2016, West's then-wife Kim Kardashian (left) released an edited video recording of Taylor Swift (right) appearing to grant her approval to some of the controversial lyrics. In March 2020, a longer recording surfaced, in which West appeared to have not mentioned lyrics that Swift eventually objected to.

=== Initial incident ===
The song includes a controversial lyric in reference to West's interruption of Taylor Swift's 2009 VMA acceptance speech and its aftermath:

For all my South Side niggas that know me best
I feel like me and Taylor might still have sex
Why? I made that bitch famous
(Goddamn!)
I made that bitch famous.

Upon the song's release, the lyric was heavily publicized and criticized by media outlets, though West defended the line, saying, "I called Taylor and had an hour long convo with her about the line and she thought it was funny and gave her blessings." In response, Swift's spokesperson adamantly denied that West asked for her approval for the controversial lyric, with an official statement claiming that Swift had only been asked to release West's song on her Twitter page, and had instead warned him not to release a track "with such a strong misogynistic message". In Swift's 2016 Grammy Awards victory speech for Album of the Year, she seemingly made a veiled reference to West's lyric, referring to "those people along the way who are going to try to undercut your success or take credit for your accomplishments or your fame".

In a June 2016 interview with GQ, West's then-wife Kim Kardashian claimed the couple possessed a video recording of West's phone call with Swift, in which Swift could be heard amiably discussing and approving the lyrics. She clarified that Swift's camp had threatened legal action should the video be released, and argued that "I swear, my husband gets so much shit for things [when] he really was doing proper protocol and even called to get it approved." In July 2016, Kardashian posted a 3-minute recording of the phone conversation online, in which Swift can allegedly be heard approving West's lyric, describing it as a "compliment" and a show of friendship. Due to the release of this video, Swift has been accused of lying about approving the lyric. In the edited video, Swift appears to say:

Yeah, go with whatever line makes you feel better, it's obviously very tongue-in-cheek either way. And I really appreciate you telling me about it, that's really nice [...] I don't think anyone would listen to that and be like 'that's a real diss, she must be crying.' You've gotta tell the story the way that it happened to you and the way that you experienced it. You honestly didn't know who I was before that. It doesn't matter that I sold 7 million of that album before you did that which is what happened, you didn't know who I was before that. It's fine. [...] If people ask me about it, I think it would be great for me to be like, 'Look, he called me and told me about the line.'

West can be heard telling Swift, "I just had a responsibility to you as a friend, you know, and thanks for being so cool about it." The recording of the call without Swift's consent was illegal and broke Californian telephone call recording law. Following the video's release, Swift released a statement stating "being falsely painted as a liar when I was never given the full story or played any part of the song is character assassination", claiming West did not tell her she would be referred to as "that bitch".

On the same day as the video's release, Kardashian tweeted about National Snake Day, saying "They have holidays for everybody, I mean everything these days! 🐍". This tweet was interpreted as being aimed at Swift, and the hashtag #TaylorSwiftIsASnake became trending. In September 2016, Swift started using a filter created by Instagram CEO Kevin Systrom to automatically delete comments using the snake emoji on her profile.

=== Later developments ===
Swift utilized snake imagery in promotional material for her sixth studio album, Reputation (2017). They were worked into merchandise, the music video for its lead single "Look What You Made Me Do", and her 2018 Reputation Stadium Tour. In June 2019, on her Tumblr post about the acquisition of the masters of her back catalog by American media proprietor Scooter Braun—West's former manager—Swift described the video as "a revenge porn music video which strips my body naked". During an interview with Rolling Stone in its October 2019 issue, Swift said that the world "didn't understand the context and events" preceding West's diss towards her. Swift also said that the drama was the last straw between her and West, stating: "When I heard the song, I was like, 'I'm done with this.'" She elaborated on her opinion of the two's relationship, saying: "I really don't want to talk about it anymore because I get worked up, and I don't want to just talk about negative shit all day."

In March 2020, a 25-minute leaked video of the same telephone conversation between West and Swift surfaced, in which West tells Swift about the line, "I feel like Taylor Swift might owe me sex" and asks, "What if later in the song I was also to have said, uh… 'I made her famous'?" Swift objects to that lyric, telling West she "pulled 7 million off Fearless" before the 2009 VMA incident. After West reveals the "owe me sex" line, Swift appears to be relieved that West did not call her a bitch, saying, "I'm glad it's not mean, though [...] I thought it was going to be like, 'That stupid, dumb bitch.' But it's not. So I don't know." West does not mention the "I made that bitch famous" line, confirming Swift's previous claim that she did not consent to being called "that bitch." The video was widely shared on social media, and the hashtag #KanyeWestIsOverParty and #TaylorToldTheTruth became trending on Twitter. In an Instagram story, Swift did not address the leak in detail, instead urging her followers to donate to relief efforts for the COVID-19 pandemic. In response, Kardashian posted a series of tweets accusing Swift of lying and denied editing the video, saying "I never edited the footage – I only posted a few clips on Snapchat to make my point and the full video that recently leaked doesn't change the narrative." Swift's publicist Tree Paine responded to Kardashian with a tweet of the original statement and captioned it "when you take parts out, that's editing."

In August 2020, West went on a Twitter rant and in one of the tweets, he may have referenced his old feud with Swift with the caption "Not gonna use a snake emoji cause you know why... I'm not sure if Christians are allowed to use snake emoji". The snake emoji was previously used by Kardashian when she indirectly called Swift a "snake".

Swift addressed the controversy in an interview with Time in December 2023, calling it "a fully manufactured frame job, in an illegally recorded phone call, which Kim Kardashian edited and then put out to say to everyone that I was a liar." She added: "that took me down psychologically to a place I've never been before... I went down really, really hard."

== Music video ==
The controversial music video featured naked wax sculptures of several celebrities. From left to right: 1. George W. Bush 2. Anna Wintour 3. Donald Trump 4. Rihanna 5. Chris Brown 6. Taylor Swift 7. Kanye West 8. Kim Kardashian 9. Ray J 10. Amber Rose 11. Caitlyn Jenner 12. Bill Cosby

The song's music video premiered at a Tidal exclusive event at The Forum in Inglewood, California, on June 24, 2016. The video begins with a camera passing slowly over the naked, lookalike sleeping bodies of famous personalities. The bodies of all of the celebrities are synthetic. At the end of the video, the camera pans out to show all of the sleeping bodies at the same time as West wakes up from his slumber. Vincent Desiderio's painting Sleep is the visual inspiration for the video.

Two days prior to the video's release, West showed the video to Dirk Standen of Vanity Fair over Skype while the video was still in its final editing stages. The video was filmed over a period of three months and went through four different versions prior to the finalized version. West did not reveal which of the celebrities' bodies in the video were real and which ones were prosthetic; however, he stated that the video was "not in support or [against] any of [the people in the video]" and was merely "a comment on fame". He also stated that he had received his wife's permission. Days after its release, E! Online editor Corinne Heller commented, "Swift is the main reason the 'Famous' video was so anticipated." However, it received "almost no reactions" from the celebrities portrayed. Audience response to the video was polarized. The music video was uploaded to YouTube on July 1, 2016. West's song "Father Stretch My Hands Pt. 1" is also featured in the video. It was negatively received on YouTube, gathering nearly 100,000 dislikes three days after being uploaded, which outweighed the number of likes. German director Werner Herzog expressed admiration for the video, describing it as "very good stuff" and admitting he had "never seen anything like this". The sculptures depicted in the music video are on a gallery tour, with sale value estimates as high as $4 million.

The video earned nominations for Best Male Video and Video of the Year at the 2016 MTV Video Music Awards, along with Best Hip-Hop Video at the 2016 MTV Video Music Awards Japan, and Best Video at the 2016 MTV Europe Music Awards. The video was also nominated for Best Video at the 2017 NME Awards.

== Credits and personnel ==
Credits adapted from West's official website.

- Production – Kanye West & Havoc
- Co-production – Noah Goldstein for Ark Productions, Inc., Charlie Heat for Very Good Beats, Inc. & Andrew Dawson
- Additional production – Hudson Mohawke, Mike Dean #MWA for Dean's List Productions & Plain Pat
- Engineering – Noah Goldstein, Andrew Dawson, Anthony Kilhoffer & Mike Dean
- Rihanna vocals recording – Marcos Tovar
- Rihanna vocals assistance – Jose Balaguer
- Rihanna vocal production – Kuk Harrell
- Swizz vocals recording – Zeke Mishanec
- Mix – Manny Marroquin at Larrabee Studios, North Hollywood, CA
- Mix assisted – Chris Galland, Ike Schultz & Jeff Jackson
- Vocals – Rihanna and Swizz Beatz

== Charts ==
=== Weekly charts ===
Weekly chart performance for "Famous"
Chart (2016)	Peak position
Australia (ARIA)	43
Belgium (Ultratip Bubbling Under Flanders)	2
Belgium Urban (Ultratop Flanders)	12
Belgium (Ultratip Bubbling Under Wallonia)	21
Canada Hot 100 (Billboard)	31
Czech Republic Singles Digital (ČNS IFPI)	36
Denmark (Tracklisten)	21
Finland Airplay (Radiosoittolista)	93
France (SNEP)	128
Hungary (Stream Top 40)	36
Ireland (IRMA)	28
Italy (FIMI)	59
Netherlands (Dutch Top 40 Tipparade)	7
Netherlands (Single Top 100)	55
New Zealand (Recorded Music NZ)	28
Norway (VG-lista)	17
Portugal (AFP)	46
Scottish Singles Sales (Official Charts)	54
Spain (Promusicae)	86
Sweden (Sverigetopplistan)	23
Switzerland (Schweizer Hitparade)	45
UK Singles (Official Charts)	33
UK Hip Hop/R&B (Official Charts)	6
US Billboard Hot 100	34
US Hot R&B/Hip-Hop Songs (Billboard)	13
US Rhythmic Airplay (Billboard)	24

=== Year-end charts ===
Year-end chart performance for "Famous"
Chart (2016)	Position
Belgium Urban (Ultratop Flanders)	56
US Hot R&B/Hip-Hop Songs (Billboard)	61

== Certifications ==
Certifications for "Famous"
Region	Certification	Certified units/sales
Australia (ARIA)	Gold	35,000^{‡}
Canada (Music Canada)	Platinum	80,000^{‡}
Denmark (IFPI Danmark)	Platinum	90,000^{‡}
France (SNEP)	Gold	100,000^{‡}
Germany (BVMI)	Gold	200,000^{‡}
Italy (FIMI)	Gold	25,000^{‡}
New Zealand (RMNZ)	2× Platinum	60,000^{‡}
Sweden (GLF)	Platinum	40,000^{‡}
United Kingdom (BPI)	Platinum	600,000^{‡}
United States (RIAA)	4× Platinum	4,000,000^{‡}
^{‡} Sales+streaming figures based on certification alone.

== Release history ==
Release history and formats for "Famous"
Region	Date	Format	Label	Ref.
United Kingdom	March 28, 2016	Digital download	GOOD; Def Jam	
United States	March 28, 2016	Rhythmic contemporary radio	GOOD; Def Jam	
United States	March 28, 2016	Urban contemporary radio	GOOD; Def Jam	
Italy	April 15, 2016	Contemporary hit radio	Universal	

== See also ==
- 2016 in hip hop music
