= Fathead (musician) =

- Born: Vernon Rainford c. 1960; Kingston, Jamaica
- Died: 19 October 1988 Florida, United States
- Genres: Dancehall
- Years active: late 1970s – 1985

Fathead (born Vernon Rainford; c. 1960 – 19 October 1988) was a dancehall musician best known for his collaborations with Yellowman in the early 1980s.

== Biography ==
Fathead was born in Kingston, Jamaica, and was already an established deejay when he began working with Yellowman, during the peak of the latter's popularity between 1980 and 1982. The pair performed regularly at the Aces Disco in St. Thomas, and recorded a live album there (the first ever live dancehall album), Live at Aces, which was sufficiently successful for studio follow-ups Bad Boy Skanking and For Your Eyes Only (both 1982). Other albums featuring the duo were One Yellowman, Supermix, and The Yellow, The Purple, and the Nancy, the latter also featuring Purpleman and Sister Nancy.

With Yellowman concentrating on solo material, Fathead went on to work with others, having a hit in 1983, with "It's Me" and collaborating with Beenie Man, Early B, Johnny Ringo, and Ranking Toyan.

Yellowman and Fathead were reunited in 1984 for the Showdown vol. 5 album, split between the duo and Purpleman.

Rainford was shot to death in Florida on 22 December 1988. During a 2009 interview with Steve Day, Yellowman confirmed that Fathead had been actively involved in the Miami drug trade, and that his participation in that trade had led to his killing.

== Discography ==
=== Albums ===
- Live at Aces (1982) VP/Jah Guidance (Yellowman & Fathead)
- Bad Boy Skanking (1982) Greensleeves (Yellowman & Fathead)
- For Your Eyes Only (1982) Arrival (Yellowman & Fathead)
- One Yellowman (1982) Hitbound (Yellowman & Fathead)
- Supermix (1982) Volcano (Yellowman & Fathead)
- Yellowman Fathead and the One Peter Metro (1982) Absissa (Yellowman, Fathead, and Peter Metro)
- The Yellow, The Purple & The Sister Nancy (1982) Greensleeves (Yellowman & Fathead, Purpleman, & Sister Nancy)
- Showdown Vol 5 (1984) Hitbound (Yellowman & Fathead & Purpleman)

=== Singles ===
- "It's Me"/"Wha Dat" (1983)
- "That's The Sound" (w/ King Mellow Yellow, 1984)
- "Wha-Do-Dem-So" (w/ King Mellow Yellow, 1984)
- "Rat Trap"
- "Come Me A Come"
- "Champion"
- "Stop All The Fight"
