= Sister Nancy =

Jamaican dancehall DJ and singer

- Also known as: Muma Nancy
- Born: Ophlin Russell; 2 January 1962 (age 64); Kingston, Jamaica
- Genre: Dancehall

Ophlin Russell (born 2 January 1962), better known as Sister Nancy (or Muma Nancy), is a Jamaican dancehall deejay and singer. She is known as the first female dancehall DJ and was described as being a "dominating female voice for over two decades" on the dancehall scene.

One of her most famous songs is "Bam Bam", labeled as a "well-known reggae anthem" by BBC and a "classic" by The Observer.

== Career ==
Born in Kingston, Jamaica, Russell was one of 15 siblings. Her elder brother, Robert, is better known as Brigadier Jerry, and by her mid-teens, she would occasionally perform on the Twelve Tribes of Israel soundsystem Jahlovemuzik sound system that she worked with, and worked for three years on the Stereophonic sound system with General Echo. Sister Nancy was born in a conservative household in Kingston. She was expected to perform conservative duties such as being an elder of the community and promote socially conservative values such as staying in the household, be drug-free, and family oriented. Early on, she rebelled against her traditional values and followed her brother Brigadier Jerry in DJing. She was repeatedly dissuaded from deejaying and encouraged to pursue Christian music by her father. When she was a teenager, she got into dancehall. She was the only girl to show up to dance. The family norms did not appeal to her and she ran away from home for months at a time. Russell followed DJ Junior Chalice around Jamaica and in St. Thomas was given a chance by him to deejay. She is quoted from an interview as saying, "Me never nervous again after that. That was 15. When I was 16 I say, 'Alright, I go step up me thing.'"

In 1980, producer Winston Riley was the first to take her into the studio, resulting in her first single, "Papa Dean" for his Techniques label. Russell went on to perform at Reggae Sunsplash, making her the first female deejay ever to perform there, and she is also the first female Jamaican deejay to tour internationally. She had further success with singles such as "One Two", "Money Can't Buy Me Love", "Transport Connection" and "Bam Bam". Her debut album, One Two was released in 1982. She went on to work with producer Henry "Junjo" Lawes, recording "A No Any Man Can Test Sister Nancy", "Bang Belly", and a collaboration with Yellowman, "Jah Mek Us Fe a Purpose". She continued to appear live, sometimes on Jahlove Music with her brother. The sound system toured internationally, with both Sister Nancy and Brigadier Jerry making their debut UK performances at the Brixton Town Hall, London in 1982.

Despite his first album being released after hers, Sister Nancy claims her brother as her main inspiration and supporter. His stage presence and voice projection have clearly influenced Sister Nancy's work and career. Aspects of his rolling vocal pattern, sing jay style, expressive performances, and culturally conscious lyrics are found in much of Sister Nancy's music. Much like her brother, she also focuses on cultural issues and has a spiritual tone as well in many of her tracks. Unlike his sister however, Brigadier Jerry was never really able to capture his exceptional live performances on a recorded track that was on par. Today he still puts out the occasional single and tours somewhat regularly.

In 1996, she relocated to New Jersey. In an interview with The Jamaica Observer in 2002, Russell said that although she was working in the banking sector, that "music is [her] first love" and said she still performs "every now and then". She explained that her absence from the recording scene was due to her wanting to "give other female artists a chance", though she said she was still "as ready as the first day [she] came into the business". The Observer cited Russell a role model for a successive generation of female acts, including Lady Saw, Sister Carol, Macka Diamond, Lady G, Shelly Thunder, Carla Marshall, Lorna G, Lady English, and Lady P.

In 2007, Russell released the second of her two albums, Sister Nancy Meets Fireproof, produced by djMush1 (formerly of the Slackers (NYC Ska)), via Special Potato Records. The album was distributed by Jammyland Records in New York, NY. The album features four original compositions, as well as four instrumental versions of the aforementioned songs.

In 2011, Sister Nancy gave an interview during which she stated that it is harder now, compared to past years, for women to make it in the music industry; when asked "why", she replied: "Maybe because there weren’t so many female artists out and men respected the women." This seems to coincide with Cooper's thoughts that dancehall music liberated women from "repressive respectability and conservative gender ideologies." Rastawomen singers are free to act and say as they please on stage, in most situations.

Upon its original release, "Bam Bam" never fully caught-on as a hit in Jamaica, but has been a fixture in other genres of music ever since. While the song was originally recorded in 1966 by Toots and the Maytals, it is Sister Nancy's version that is so often sampled in various genres. R. Henry Gordon, N. N. McCarthy and Frederick "Toots" Hibbert hold the copyright to the original version of the song, but were never compensated for royalties, either, for use of the song by Sister Nancy or any artist who sampled her successive versions.

In 2016, Sister Nancy retired from being a bank accountant in New Jersey so she could pursue music and performing. She played at Rebel Salute 2017 in Jamaica in January as well as played at Brooklyn Bowl in New York on 25 May 2017. In her interview with HOT 97 she stated that she planned to do more shows in the coming future.

In 2024, she was the subject of Bam Bam: The Sister Nancy Story, a documentary film by Canadian filmmaker Alison Duke.

=== Collaborations and samples ===
Sister Nancy collaborated with Thievery Corporation on the song "Originality" for the 2006 compilation album Versions. She also collaborated with DJ /rupture and Kid 606 on the "Little More Oil" single in 2006.

In 2024, she collaborated with the Naya Rockers on the single "Teach the Youths" (featuring guitarists Earl "Chinna" Smith and Andy Bassford and keyboardist Cameron Greenlee) for the Higher Education benefit album supporting Kingston's Alpha School of Music.

Sister Nancy's classic "Bam Bam" has been re-recorded and sampled over 80 times since its release in 1982 including:

- "Badd" by Stylo G in 2013.
- "Famous" by Kanye West on the album The Life of Pablo (2016).
- "Bam" featuring Damian Marley on the Jay-Z album 4:44 (2017).
- Unknown track by Main Source in 1996.
- Canadian producer RCola brought Sister Nancy into Liondub's studio to re-sing her classic "Bam Bam", released in 2007 as a drum and bass dancefloor remix "A What A Bam Bam (Remixes)" on 12" vinyl with Division One remix on the AA side.
- In 2007, Sister Nancy voiced a dubplate of her "Bam Bam" with new lyrics for Atlanta ragga/drum and bass DJ Tester.
- Canadian/American producer Krinjah published a 12" vinyl single "Bam Bam (Remix)" in 2001, which helped start off the ragga-jungle revival in North America.

== Personal life ==
She worked as an accountant at a bank in New Jersey and, as of 2014, had retired from the profession.

== Discography ==
=== EP ===
- Armageddon (2021)

=== Albums ===
- One, Two (1982) Techniques
- The Yellow, The Purple & The Nancy (1982) Greensleeves (with Yellowman, Fathead, and Purpleman)
- Sister Nancy Meets Fireproof (2001) Special Potato Records (with djMush1 aka Jeremy Mushlin)
- Armageddon (2025) Ariwa (with Mad Professor)

=== Singles ===
- "One Two" Techniques
- "Bam Bam" Techniques
- "Transport Connection" Techniques
- "Proud a We" (1982) Techniques
- "King and Queen" (1982) AMCO (Yellowman & Sister Nancy)
- "No Dun And Put Dun" Digital B
- "Deh Yah Long Time" Digital B
- "Little More Oil" (2004) Soul Jazz (with DJ /rupture and Kid 606)
- "Papa Dean" Techniques
- "Solid Has a Rock" Techniques
- "Dance Pon Your Corner" Volcano
- "Originality" (2006) Thievery Corporation
- "Love Jah" King Jammy's
- "Fool Say in His Heart" Easy Star Records
- "Ting Mi Dis a Come" African Stars
- "Muma is Coming" Shocking Vibes
- "Ram Dance Daughta" Shocking Vibes
- "Chalice" Volcano
- "Roof Over Mi Head"
- "Ain't no Stopping Nancy" One Two

=== Compilation appearances ===
- A Dee-Jay Explosion (Inna Dance Hall Style) Heartbeat - live album recorded in 1982 includes "One Two" (Sister Nancy & Lee Van Cliff)
