= Winston Riley =

Jamaican singer-songwriter

Winston Delano Riley
- Born: 14 May 1943; Kingston, Jamaica
- Died: 19 January 2012 (aged 68) Kingston, Jamaica
- Genres: Ska, rocksteady, reggae, dancehall
- Occupations: Producer; singer; songwriter
- Years active: 1960–2011
- Formerly of: The Techniques

Winston Riley (14 May 1943 – 19 January 2012) was a Jamaican singer, songwriter and record producer. The Jamaica Gleaner notes he was one of the most successful reggae producers.

== Biography ==
Riley was born in Kingston, Jamaica. He formed the band The Techniques in 1962 and recorded material with that group. He formed his own label in 1968 and produced records for several musicians, including Alton and Hortense Ellis and Johnny Osbourne. Riley's own song, "Double Barrel", performed by Dave and Ansell Collins under his own production, was one of the first international reggae hits, reaching number 1 in the Dutch and UK Singles Chart.

His "Stalag" riddim is the most sampled reggae song of all time. The rhythm was first released in 1973, as the instrumental Ansell Collins track "Stalag 17", named after the World War II film of the same name. It reappeared later as "Stalag 18", "Stalag 19", "Stalag 20" and "Ring the Alarm Quick".

Riley produced General Echo's influential album The Slackest in 1979, and he went on to launch the careers of Sister Nancy, Buju Banton, Cutty Ranks, Lone Ranger and Frankie Paul.

The band Widespread Panic recorded Echo's song "Arlene", and have performed many versions of it at their concerts.

== Discography ==
Studio albums

- Meditation Dub (1977)
- Meditation Dub Vol 2 (LP) (1999)
- Meditation Dub Vol 3 (LP) (1999)

Singles & EPs

- Sir Lee / Norman Grant / The Revolutionaires / Sonia Pottinger / Dillinger / Winston Riley - Back To The Music / Natty Dub It Into Dreamland / Melting Pot / Ital Rockers / Dub With Natty / Melting Dub (12", EP) (1977)
- Ansil Collin* / Winston* & Ansil* - "Black Out" / "Zion I" (7", single)

Compilations

- Quintessential Techniques (2009)

== Death ==
On 1 November 2011, Winston was shot in the head at his home in Kingston. According to police, he had been the subject of several earlier attacks. After being in a coma since the shooting, he died on 19 January 2012.
