= Where Do Broken Hearts Go =

1988 single by Whitney Houston

Single by Whitney Houston

from the album Whitney
- B-side: "Where You Are"; "If You Say My Eyes Are Beautiful"
- Released: February 15, 1988
- Recorded: January–February 1987
- Studio: Right Track Recording (Manhattan)
- Genre: Pop; R&B; soul
- Length: 4:38
- Label: Arista
- Songwriters: Frank Wildhorn; Chuck Jackson
- Producer: Narada Michael Walden

Whitney Houston singles chronology
"So Emotional" (1987)	"Where Do Broken Hearts Go" (1988)	"Love Will Save the Day" (1988)

Music video
- "Where Do Broken Hearts Go" on YouTube

"Where Do Broken Hearts Go" is a song by American singer and actress Whitney Houston from her second studio album, Whitney (1987). Written by Frank Wildhorn and Chuck Jackson and produced by Narada Michael Walden, Arista Records released it as the album's fourth single from the album on February 15, 1988. Houston initially refused to record the song due to what she perceived to be a lack of a message but eventually changed her mind once Arista president Clive Davis convinced her it would be a success for her.

A pop and soul ballad, the song is performed by a woman who reflects on a past relationship following a painful breakup and is convinced of reuniting with her former lover in the distant future. Some commentators cited the song as marking a shift towards more introspective and emotional themes in Houston's music. Prior to recording the ballad, singer Smokey Robinson offered to record it but was rebuffed by the song's composers. It was one of the first songs presented to Arista and one of the last to be recorded for the Whitney album.

Music critics were mostly positive towards the song upon its release. A major commercial success, it topped the Billboard Hot 100 for two weeks and became Houston's seventh record-setting consecutive number-one single on the chart, breaking a chart record set previously by the Beatles and the Bee Gees. As of 2026, the record still holds. It also reached the top-ten in five international territories including Canada and Ireland and peaked inside the top twenty in the United Kingdom. The music video was directed by Peter Israelson in Newark, New Jersey. Despite claims of "selling out" due to the sound of the song and of the racially ambiguous appearance of her love interest in the video, it received heavy rotation on MTV and BET and won Houston a Soul Train Music Award nomination for R&B/Urban Contemporary Single – Female. Houston performed the song in full on the 1988 concert legs of her Moment of Truth World Tour while including the song in medley sets throughout the 1990s, often in the "Love Medley" section created by Houston and musical director Rickey Minor.

The song has since become one of Houston's signature ballads and along with her other hits on the Whitney album, helped to set a benchmark for female artists. The ballad has been covered by many artists over the years from diverse genres including Wayne Wonder, Me First and the Gimme Gimmes, Sandy Lam and Pia Toscano. Following Houston's death in 2012, it has been included in lists of best-of songs, most notably Essence, where the song topped the list of greatest break-up songs ever.

== Background ==
In February 1985, Whitney Houston released her acclaimed self-titled debut album. After a slow start, the album's sales picked up after the success of her single "You Give Good Love", which first topped the Hot Black Singles chart in May 1985 before surprisingly crossing over successfully to pop and adult contemporary radio, later peaking at numbers three and four respectively on the Billboard Hot 100 and adult contemporary chart two months later that July.

It was then followed by three successive singles - "Saving All My Love for You", "How Will I Know" and "Greatest Love of All" - all of which topped the Billboard Hot 100 in a row, the first for a female solo artist and also set a record for the most number one pop singles off a single album by a female artist, while the album itself would become the best selling album of all time by a black female artist at the time.

Davis initially had plans to work on Houston's sophomore album, Whitney, in early 1986 and initially planned for the album to be released in September of the year but due to the debut album's continued success on the pop charts, buoyed by the success of "Greatest Love of All", Davis pushed the date to February 1987 and then to June 1987 following the airplay success of the ballad "All at Once", which Houston had performed on television and in festivals such as the Sanremo Music Festival in February 1987.

== Writing and recording ==
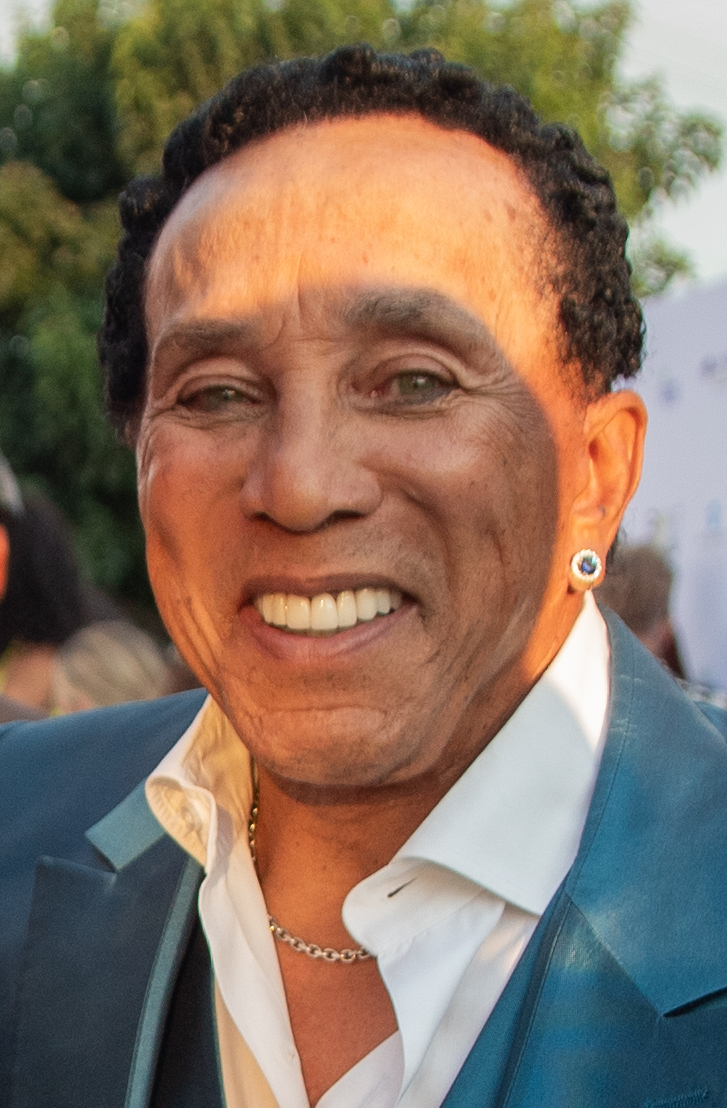
Smokey Robinson offered to record "Where Do Broken Hearts Go" before Houston recorded the song.

In 1984, while driving in his car, musical composer Frank Wildhorn, who later conceived the Broadway musical, Jekyll & Hyde, first heard Houston on the radio on her hit duet, "Hold Me", with Teddy Pendergrass. Upon hearing Houston's voice, Wildhorn remembered saying "that's a voice I would like to write for."

Born and raised in New York City, Wildhorn signed with Chrysalis Publishing around this time period and had about 80 songs recorded in a five-year period. Among the songs Wildhorn first wrote was a song called "One More Night" for singer Donna Washington, which was produced by Charles "Chuck" Jackson, who wrote the hits, "This Will Be" and "I've Got Love on My Mind" for Natalie Cole in the mid-1970s. Following this collaboration, Wildhorn and Jackson agreed to work together.

Not too long afterwards, Wildhorn received a phone call from Jackson who gave him the title of a new song they were to work on together called "Where Do Broken Hearts Go". Wildhorn later told Billboard editor Joel Whitburn, "I sat there at the piano, and in about 40 minutes, 90 percent of the sketch of the song was done." Continued Wildhorn: "I called [Jackson] back and said 'You gotta come over here tonight because I think we've got something." The song was completed that same night and a demo tape with "just a piano, drum machine, and one vocal" was recorded.

Cherie Fonorow, who worked at Chrysalis, submitted the ballad to Clive Davis at Arista. Said Wildhorn: "Clive really liked the song, but he needed a bridge." Wildhorn obliged and soon a bridge was added. The song was among the first to be submitted in songs that Davis and executives at Arista sought to include on Houston's sophomore album, Whitney, around June 1986. Wildhorn admitted later that he and Jackson were worried that the song would be passed over after not getting word for months after submitting the song:

"From what I understand, it was one of the first songs chosen for the album. Knowing [it was for] Whitney's project, there must have been 50,000 songs submitted after (ours). So every week it was, 'Do we still have it?' We were going through hell."

According to published reports, when Houston heard the demo of the song, she flatly turned down recording it, feeling the song "lacked a message", was "trite" and "had no depth", something the singer confirmed in later interviews. In 2000, Houston admitted, "I didn't even wanna do '[Where Do] Broken Hearts [Go]', I hated the song, I didn't wanna sing it." In a 2010 interview, Houston claimed she was in Davis' office having "such a big fuss" about recording it. In both interviews, Houston stated that Davis continually stressed to her that the song was a number one song for her.

Because of Houston's reluctance, other singers offered to record it, including Motown artist Smokey Robinson, who was at the time recording content for his comeback album, One Heartbeat. Despite Robinson's insistence on recording the song, he was rebuffed by the songwriters and Davis, who still were pinning their hopes on Houston changing her mind in recording the song.

It was only after producer Narada Michael Walden retooled the song's sound that Houston agreed to record it around February 1987, following her performance at the 29th Annual Grammy Awards. In 2012, Wildhorn told Playbill that after initially sending the song to Davis and Houston, he received a letter from the pair saying they loved the song but that they wanted a second bridge, to which Wildhorn composed on the spot. It was eventually accepted.

The recording took place at Manhattan's Right Track Studios. Houston admitted that she eventually found "some meaning in [the song] that [she] could relate to". Walden admitted that the song was the hardest to record because, "[Houston] wasn't used to having her heart broken. We had to lower all the lights, put the candles on, take a moment, just kind of imagine how [she'd] feel broken down with tears, and have nowhere to go. That was the hardest gear to shift into. But once she got there, if you hear 'Where Do Broken Hearts Go,' it'll break your heart." Along with the uptempo single, "So Emotional", recorded a month later, it became one of the last songs to be recorded for the album.

Following the release of Whitney, three singles — "I Wanna Dance with Somebody (Who Loves Me)", "Didn't We Almost Have It All" and "So Emotional" — preceded the ballad, all going to number one on the Billboard Hot 100. As planned, Davis set the release for "Where Do Broken Hearts Go" to be the album's fourth official single in February 1988, exactly a year after its recording.

Wildhorn recalled to Songfacts on being struck by her performance of the song after Davis played it for him:

“I cried the first time I heard Whitney sing ‘Where Do Broken Hearts Go.’ I've had Julie Andrews, Liza Minnelli, Johnny Mathis, Trisha Yearwood and Patti LaBelle (sing songs I've written), but if someone put a gun to my head, the answer is Whitney's version of ‘Where Do Broken Hearts Go,’ going No. 1, that's as good as it gets.”

By 2010, more than twenty years later, Houston cited the ballad as being "now one of [her] most favorite songs".

“Where Do Broken Hearts Go” is a pop and soul song with R&B elements. According to the sheet music published by Sony Music Publishing, the song is written in the key of D major and follows a chord progression of D-C♯-B-F♯-G-A-Bm_{7}Em_{7} with a key change of D♯ near the end of the song.

The beat is set in common time, and moves at a moderate tempo of 66 beats per minute. Houston's vocals in the song span from the note of A_{3} to the note of D_{5}, while the piano elements range from the low note of B♭_{1} to the high note of C_{6}.

== Critical reception ==
Initial critical reception was mostly positive. AllMusic's Ron Wynn highlighted the track in his review of the Whitney album. Robert Hilburn of the Los Angeles Times described it as a ballad "that raises questions without making you care about the answers."

People Magazine said that songs like "Where Do Broken Hearts Go" "have some substance". Pop Rescue noted it as a "classic big 80s power ballad", adding it as "the perfect ending to a school disco."

== Chart performance ==
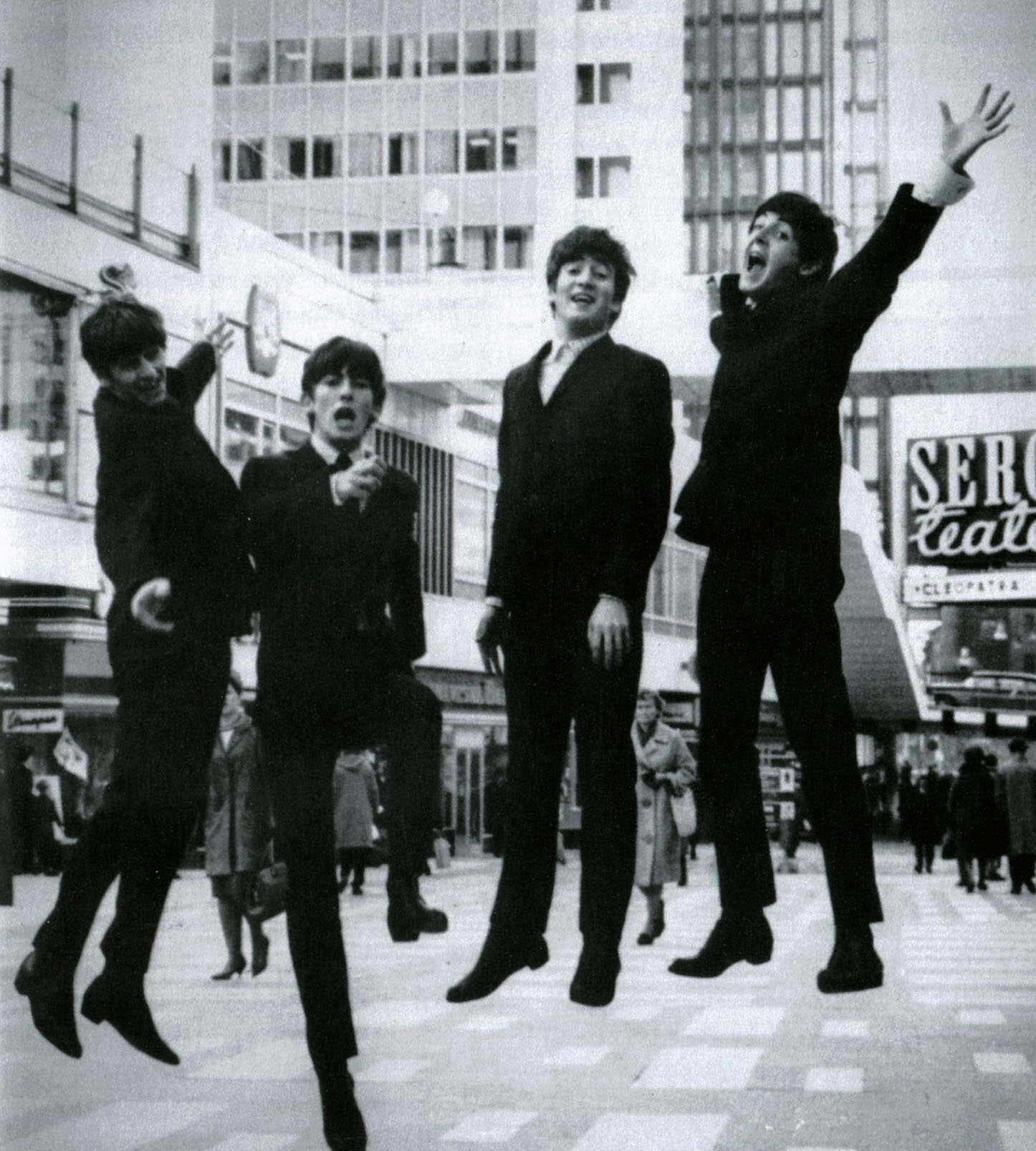
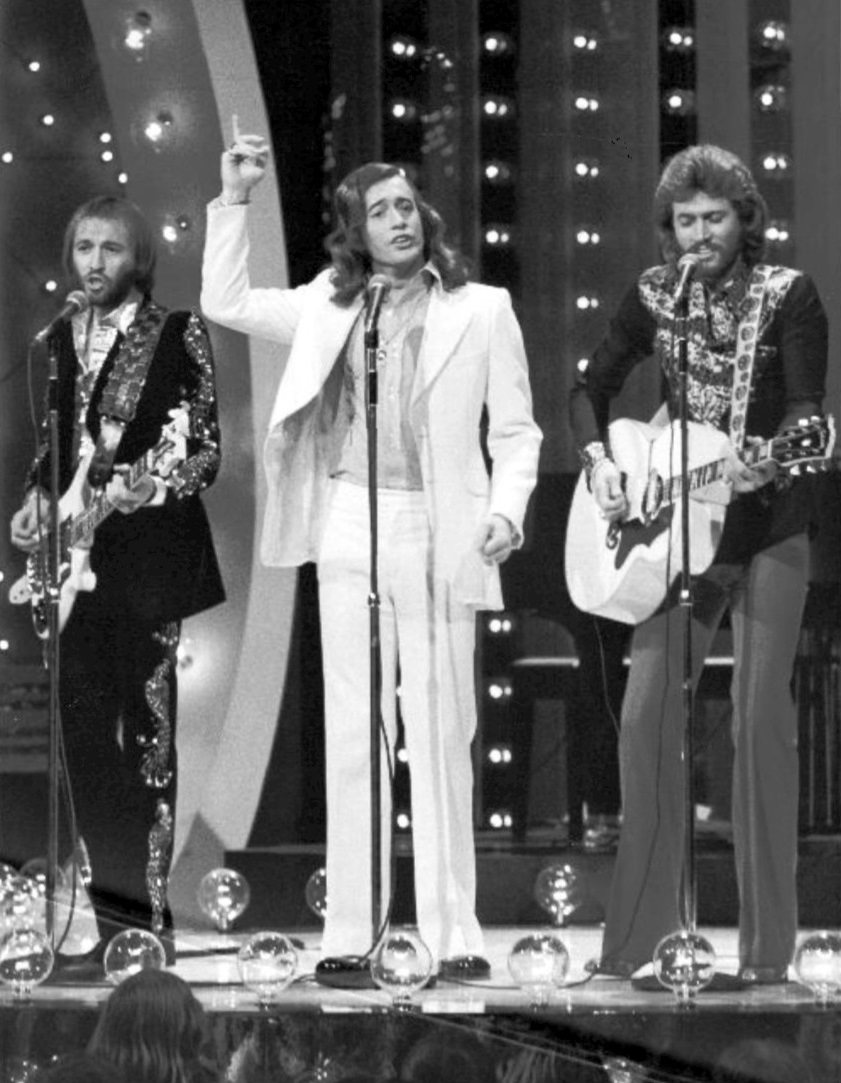
"Where Do Broken Hearts Go" broke the all-time record of most consecutive number one singles on the Billboard Hot 100 first set by The Beatles and the Bee Gees.

"Where Do Broken Hearts Go" entered the Billboard Hot 100 at number 47 on February 27, 1988, as the "Hot Shot Debut" of that week, two weeks after its release. After entering the top 40 on March 5, it hit the top ten on April 2 in just its sixth week. Three weeks later, it peaked at number one on April 23, 1988 in its ninth week replacing Billy Ocean's "Get Outta My Dreams, Get into My Car", setting an all-time chart record in which Houston became the first and only artist in pop music history with seven consecutive number one singles, a record Houston still holds. Houston's record was also significant in that it broke the record first set by The Beatles and later shared with the Bee Gees, each of which scored six consecutive number one hits in a row. It also topped the Hot 100 Singles Sales and Hot 100 Airplay charts. After a two-week run, it was replaced by Terence Trent D'Arby's "Wishing Well". The song would spend 13 weeks inside the top 40, six weeks inside the top ten and a cumulative total of 18 weeks on the chart altogether.

Following the song's chart peak, Houston wrote a congratulatory letter to Wildhorn that said, "Where do broken hearts go? I have no idea, I'm still trying to figure that out". When Davis called Houston to inform her that she had set a chart record with the ballad in "surpass[ing] Elvis and The Beatles and I was the only woman to do that," Houston replied in 2000, "ah, that's history." The song was also the first and only number one hit on the Billboard Hot 100 for both Wildhorn and Jackson. (Note: Prior to the release of "Where Do Broken Hearts Go", Chuck Jackson's most successful composition was Natalie Cole's "This Will Be", which peaked at number six on the Billboard Hot 100 in 1975.)

Walden summed up Houston's achievement by stating: "Whitney's seventh number one in a row is not only a great achievement in the outer world but a significant achievement in the inner world as well. There are seven lower worlds and seven higher worlds, with Whitney's seventh in a row, she takes us all to that seventh higher world. This is the place that all broken hearts go to for inner nourishment, inner satisfaction, inner and outer peace."

The song achieved additional chart records. Houston followed Michael Jackson as just the second artist to produce four or more number one singles off a single album at number one on the Billboard Hot 100, over a month after Jackson had set the record with "Man in the Mirror" off his Bad album. Houston was also the first female artist to set this record. Since then, only five other artists have set this record, including George Michael (Faith, 1987–88), Paula Abdul (Forever Your Girl, 1989–90), Janet Jackson (Janet Jackson's Rhythm Nation 1814, 1989–91), Mariah Carey (Mariah Carey, 1990–91) and Katy Perry (Teenage Dream, 2010–11). Houston briefly set the record for the most number one singles by a female solo artist in chart history, surpassing Diana Ross. The song helped Houston to become the top female pop singles artist of 1988. The song found success on other charts, entering the Billboard Hot Black Singles chart (now "Hot R&B/Hip-Hop Songs") at number 60 on the week of March 5, 1988, peaking at number two nine weeks later, bested by Al B. Sure!'s "Nite and Day", becoming Houston's tenth consecutive R&B top ten hit in a row and helped Houston to be the top black female artist of the year, according to Billboard. On the Billboard Hot Adult Contemporary chart, the single peaked at number one, the issue dated April 2, 1988, and remained there for three weeks, making it her sixth number one single on the chart. It was also her ninth consecutive top ten record on the chart, a 1980s record for a female artist. In 2020, the record was certified gold by the Recording Industry Association of America for digital sales and stream equivalent sales of 500,000 units.

The ballad was ranked number 33 and 47, on the Billboard Top Pop and Top Black Singles year-end charts for 1988, respectively. The single also placed at number two on the Top Adult Contemporary Singles year-end chart of the same year. In Canada, the song entered RPM Top 100 Singles chart at number 76, the issue date of March 5, 1988, and peaked at number six on the chart on May 14, 1988, becoming Houston's eighth top ten hit in the country. It also reached the top ten in the Canadian province of Quebec.

Outside North America, "Where Do Broken Hearts Go" achieved more moderate success than her previous singles from the Whitney album. The single debuted at number 30 on the UK Singles Chart, for the week ending date of March 12, 1988, and three weeks later reached a peak of number 14 on the chart. In Ireland, it peaked at number two, the highest chart position of the song outside the United States. It also reached the top ten in Iceland, Luxembourg and Venezuela. The song reached number 48 in Australia, number 47 in the Netherlands, and number 23 in New Zealand.

In 2022, the record was certified silver by the British Phonographic Industry for digital sales and stream equivalent sales of 200,000 units.

== Music video ==
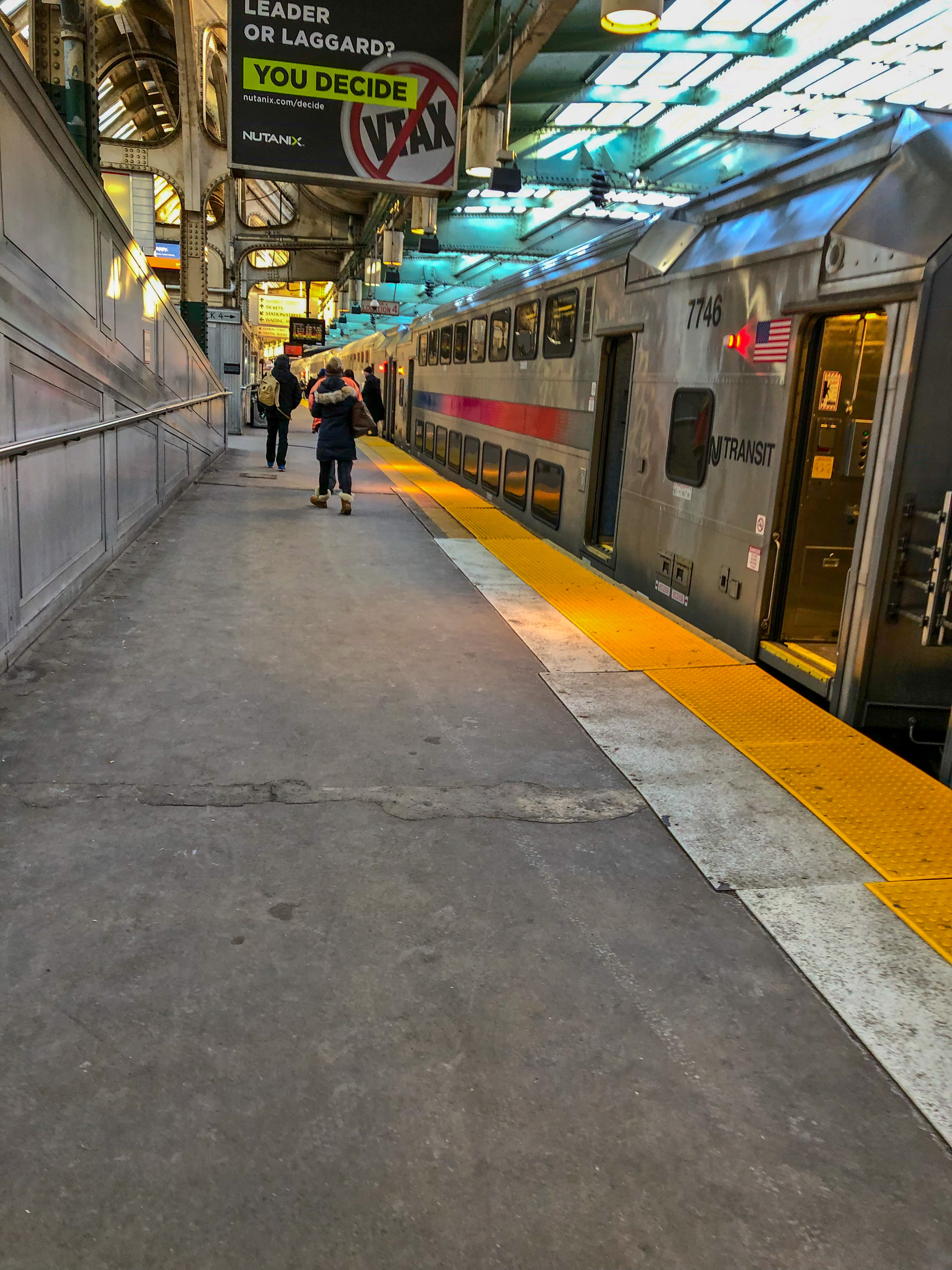
Parts of the video for "Where Do Broken Hearts Go" was shot at Newark Penn Station.

The music video, directed by Peter Israelson in his second music video collaboration with Houston after "Greatest Love of All", was shot at the singer's hometown of Newark, New Jersey in 1987.

In the beginning of the video, Houston gets a bouquet of flowers from her boyfriend sent to her dressing room. Upon receiving the flowers, she finds a small note that simply says "goodbye".

Fearing that her boyfriend has simply moved on, she reflects on happy memories; asking herself, "where do broken hearts go?" Houston leaves her dressing room, picking out one of the flowers from the bouquet. In the conclusion, as she walks, she is stopped by her boyfriend in surprise and the couple reunites. The video was shot both in color and in black and white for the "memories" portion.

Houston is depicted in various "glamour girl" shots throughout the video; Arista executives reportedly joked at the time, "there's her screen test", referring to rumors about Houston's Hollywood ambitions. In 2002, Israelson told Liquid Assets, a British TV documentary series focused on the net worth of celebrities, that Houston's performance in the video's 1940s-themed train station scene (filmed at Newark Penn Station) convinced Kevin Costner of her acting abilities for The Bodyguard.

The video was moderately controversial since the ambiguous ethnic background of Houston's love interest (reportedly Houston's then real-life boyfriend, black New York restaurateur Brad Johnson) highlighted the racial sensitivities that accompanied Houston's success during the 1980s. The singer had been criticized for "selling out" and "acting white".

Houston addressed the situation with her music in a 1988 NBC-TV interview while promoting her then-upcoming benefit concert for the United Negro College Fund, saying, "what do they want me to do? I think music is music. I mean, how do I sing more black? Or what am I doing that's making me sound white? I don't understand. I'm singing music from my heart and soul and that's it. So I don't really think it's an issue in my life."

Some members of the audience at the Soul Train Music Awards jeered at Houston's name when "Where Do Broken Hearts Go" was nominated for an award at the 1989 ceremony. The incident was later dramatized in the official Houston biopic, Whitney Houston: I Wanna Dance with Somebody, in 2022. Despite this, the video still received heavy rotation on the black station BET as well as MTV, which continued Houston's success with all racial demographics.

The video was uploaded to YouTube in September 2012 and has amassed more than 119 million views on the platform and is her second most viewed music video from the Whitney album on the channel.

== Live performances ==
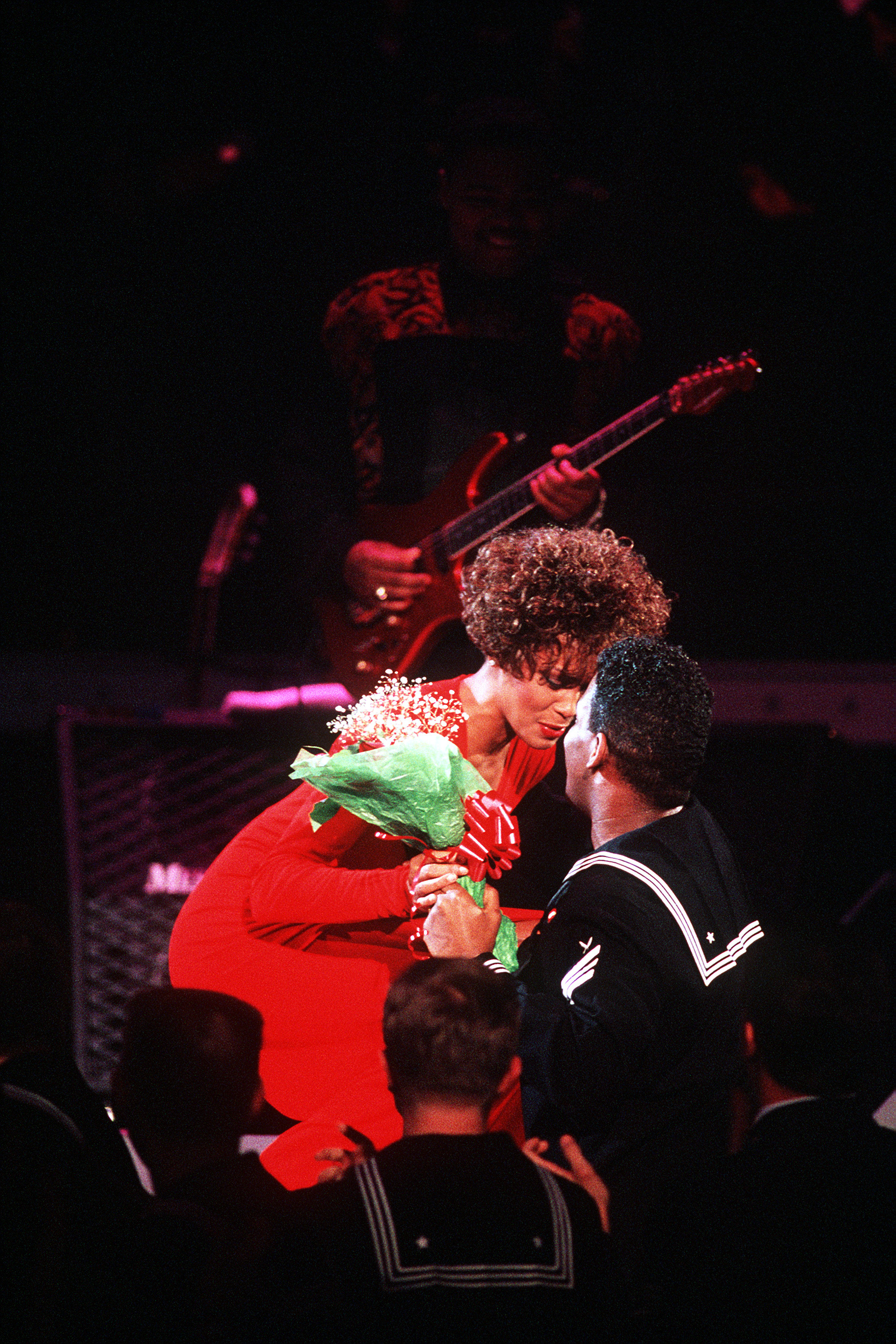
Houston performing the song during the Welcome Home Heroes concert in 1991.

Houston first performed "Where Do Broken Hearts Go" at Montreux Golden Rose Rock Festival in Montreux, Switzerland on May 15, 1987. The performance was broadcast later in the US, as well as on various European TV channels. Houston sang the song at the 15th American Music Awards, held on January 25, 1988. She performed the song on the UK BBC1 TV show Wogan, which was hosted by Terry Wogan in 1988. "Where Do Broken Hearts Go" was one of the songs performed on Houston's set list during Nelson Mandela 70th Birthday Celebration concert, televised live worldwide via BBC, at Wembley Stadium in London on June 11, 1988. In the US, the edit version of the concert was broadcast later on Fox TV network.

Aside from the several live televised performances, the song was included on the set-lists on four of Houston's world tours. During her Moment of Truth World Tour (1987–88), the performance of the song was slightly different from the album version. Starting the song in its usual tempo, Houston ended the song with an extended coda vamp where she used her chest voice and head voice, eliciting cheers and applause from the audience while doing so. On her Feels So Right tour in Japan, the song started to be included in the so-called "Love Medley", arranged by Houston and then-musical director Rickey Minor, including the song with Houston's other ballad hits such as "All at Once" and "Didn't We Almost Have It All", while it would be preceded by half-brother and background vocalist Gary Garland performing bits of Luther Vandross' rendition of "A House Is Not a Home" and ending it by sampling bits of "Anyone Who Had a Heart" and "Say You Love Me", by Dionne Warwick and Jennifer Holliday respectively. The same medley would later be used on Houston's 97-date I'm Your Baby Tonight World Tour (1991) and performed live on the HBO-TV concert, Welcome Home Heroes with Whitney Houston on March 31, 1991.

The song would be used slightly different on her Bodyguard World Tour where the song would be included along with "Nobody Loves Me Like You Do", "All at Once", "Didn't We Almost Have It All" and afterwards would be followed by "All the Man That I Need". On the 1993 and 1994 performances of the medley at Radio City Music Hall in Manhattan, the song would be followed by a full rendition of "Say You Love Me" before ending the song. Houston continued to use the song on two more tours, the Pacific Rim Tour (1997) and the European Tour (1998) as well as in her 1996 concert, Whitney: Brunei The Royal Wedding Celebration.

== Legacy ==
=== Retrospective accolades ===
The ballad landed at number 11 on Entertainment Weekly's 25 best Whitney Houston songs in 2024. In their list of Houston's 20 greatest songs that same year, Forbes listed the ballad at number 18 and cited it as the song that "marked a shift towards more introspective and emotional themes in her music."

Bill Lamb of About.com ranked it as the sixth best Houston song of all time. BET ranked it her 14th best song, calling it an "ostentatious classic".

Essence voted the song as the "Greatest Break-Up Song of All Time".

MTV included the song as one of Houston's ten best songs, calling the song "medicine for an ailing heart".

=== Covers and samples ===
It also became one of Houston's most covered tunes, being performed by the likes of artists such as Pia Toscano, Me First and the Gimme Gimmes, Sandy Lam and Wayne Wonder.

The same song was sampled in 1994 by reggae artists Tony Rebel and Garnett Silk in the song of the same name on their 1994 collaborative album, Tony Rebel Meets Garnett Silk in a Dancehall Conference, their final effort before Silk's death that same year.

In 2012, American Idol season 11 contestant Skylar Laine covered the song in a country-styled ballad, earning high praise from show guest judges Jimmy Iovine and Mary J. Blige.

=== Usage in popular culture ===
The song was very popular in the Philippines, and it became one of the main focus of the 2014 indie romantic film That Thing Called Tadhana.

== Track listing and formats ==
- US, 7" vinyl single

A1: "Where Do Broken Hearts Go" – 4:37
B1: "Where You Are" – 4:10

- US, 12" vinyl single

A: "Where Do Broken Hearts Go" – 4:29
B1: "Where You Are" – 4:10
B2: "Didn't We Almost Have It All" (Dub Mix) – 7:45

- US, Cassette single

A: "Where Do Broken Hearts Go" – 4:37
B: "Where You Are" – 4:10

- UK, 12" vinyl single

A: "Where Do Broken Hearts Go" – 4:37
B1: "If You Say My Eyes Are Beautiful" (Duet with Jermaine Jackson) – 4:19
B2: "Where You Are" – 4:10

- Japan, 7" vinyl single

A: "Where Do Broken Hearts Go" – 4:37
B: "Where You Are" – 4:10

- Europe, CD single
1. "Where Do Broken Hearts Go" – 4:37
2. "Where You Are" – 4:10
3. "Didn't We Almost Have It All" (Live Version) – 7:45

== Charts and certifications ==
=== Weekly charts ===
Chart (1988)	Peak position
Australia (Kent Music Report)	48
Belgium (Ultratop 50 Flanders)	28
Canada Top Singles (RPM)	6
Canada Adult Contemporary (RPM)	1
Canada Retail Singles (The Record)	20
European Hot 100 Singles (Music & Media)	50
Iceland (Íslenski Listinn Topp 10)	8
Ireland (IRMA)	2
Luxembourg (Radio Luxembourg)	10
Netherlands (Dutch Top 40 Tipparade)	4
Netherlands (Single Top 100)	47
New Zealand (Recorded Music NZ)	23
Quebec (ADISQ)	5
Spain (AFYVE)	32
UK Singles (Official Charts)	14
US Billboard Hot 100	1
US Hot R&B/Hip-Hop Songs (Billboard)	2
US Adult Contemporary (Billboard)	1
US Top 100 Singles (Cash Box)	1
US Top Black Contemporary Singles (Cash Box)	4
Venezuela (UPI)	8

Chart (2012)	Peak position
UK Singles (Official Charts)	74

=== Year-end charts ===
Chart (1988)	Position
Canada Top Singles (RPM)	74
US Top Pop Singles (Billboard)	33
US Top Adult Contemporary Singles (Billboard)	2
US Top Black Singles (Billboard)	47
US Top 50 Pop Singles (Cash Box)	15

=== Certifications ===
Region	Certification	Certified units/sales
United Kingdom (BPI)	Silver	200,000^{‡}
United States (RIAA)	Gold	500,000^{‡}
^{‡} Sales+streaming figures based on certification alone.

== Credits and personnel ==
"Where Do Broken Hearts Go"

- Whitney Houston – vocals, vocal arrangement
- Narada Michael Walden – drum programming
- Frank Martin – piano, synths
- Preston "Tiger Head" Glass – synth programming, bells
- Randy "The King" Jackson – bass synth
- Corrado Rustici – guitar synth
- Greg "Gigi" Gonaway – Simmons
- Michael Gibbs – string arrangements, conductor
- Jim Gilstrap, Karen "Kitty Beethoven" Brewington, Niki Haris, Jennifer Hall - background vocals

"If You Say My Eyes Are Beautiful"

- Whitney Houston – vocals
- Jermaine Jackson – vocals
- Elliot Willensky – writer
- Tom Keane – producer
- Jermaine Jackson – producer

"Where You Are"

- Whitney Houston – vocals
- Dyan Humes – writer
- Lemel Humes – writer
- James Calabres – writer
- Kashif – producer

== See also ==
- List of Hot 100 number-one singles of 1988 (U.S.)
- List of number-one adult contemporary singles of 1988 (U.S.)
- Billboard Hot 100 chart achievements & milestones

== Bibliography ==
- Seal, Richard (1994). Whitney Houston: One Moment in Time. Britannia Press Publishing. ISBN 0-9519937-8-X.
- Walden, Narada Michael (2012). Whitney Houston: The Voice, The Music, The Inspiration. Insight Editions. ISBN 978-1-608-87200-8.
