= Journey to Addis =

Studio album by Third World
- Released: 1978
- Genre: Reggae fusion
- Length: 40:45
- Label: Island
- Producer: Alex Sadkin, Third World

Third World chronology
96° in the Shade (1977)	Journey to Addis (1978)	Story's Been Told (1979)

Singles from Journey to Addis
- 1. "Now That We Found Love" Released: September 18, 1978

Journey to Addis is the third album by Jamaican reggae group Third World, released by Island Records in 1978. It marks a shift from pure reggae to a fusion of reggae and soul music. The album reached number 66 in Canada.

The group was looking for a worldwide success and not success in just Jamaica and England, hence the new fusion approach, which may not have pleased the die-hard reggae fans. A case in point may be the O'Jays cover "Now That We Found Love". The song peaked at number 10 in the UK, number 47 on the Billboard Hot 100, and number 55 on the RPM Top 100. The follow-up single, “Cool Meditation,” was a British top 20 hit.

== Track listing ==
Track listing in Discogs:

Side one
No.	Title	Writer(s)	Length
1.	"One Cold Vibe (Couldn’t Stop Dis Ya Boogie)"	Stephen Coore	4:55
2.	"Cold Sweat"	Stephen Coore	3:55
3.	"Cool Meditation"	Michael Cooper	3:40
4.	"African Woman"	William Clarke	6:30

Side two
No.	Title	Writer(s)	Length
1.	"Now That We Found Love"	Kenny Gamble, Leon Huff	7:39
2.	"Journey to Addis"	Don Drummond and the Skatalites	6:40
3.	"Fret Not Thyself"	William Clarke, Michael Cooper, Stephen Coore	4:30
4.	"Rejoice"	William Clarke, Michael Cooper, Stephen Coore	3:50

== Personnel ==
Third World

- Bunny Rugs - vocals
- Michael "Ibo" Cooper - keyboards
- Steven "Cat" Coore - lead guitar
- Irvin "Carrot" Jarrett - percussions
- Richard "Richie" Daley - bass
- Willie Stewart - drums

Production

- Produced by Alex Sadkin and Third World.
- Cover painting by Tony Wright.
