= The Story's Been Told =

Studio album by Third World
- Released: 1979
- Genre: Reggae
- Length: 40:45
- Label: Island
- Producer: Third World

Third World chronology
Journey to Addis (1978)	The Story's Been Told (1979)	Arise in Harmony (1980)

The Story's Been Told is the fourth studio album by Jamaican reggae group Third World, released by Island Records in 1979.

The album is representative of the band's transition from roots reggae to the more pop-oriented work of its later years. The song "Talk to Me" charted in the UK at No. 54.

== Critical reception ==
Professional ratings
Review scores
Source	Rating
Music Week	4/4 stars

Timothy White, in The New York Times, praised the album, writing: "'Talk to Me,' the rollicking centerpiece of The Story's Been Told, will probably find a favorable audience among the dance crowd; the sound is marvellously lean and smoothly paced, with strong vocal attacks by William (Bunny Rugs) Clarke, the lead singer."

Reggae & Caribbean Music highlighted the album's "tight disco riffs."

== Track listing ==
Side one
No.	Title	Writer(s)	Length
1.	"Talk to Me"	William Clarke	8:20
2.	"Irie Ites"	Steven "Cat" Coore	4:33
3.	"Always Around"	Irvin Jarrett	4:37

Side two
No.	Title	Writer(s)	Length
1.	"Tonight for Me"	Clarke / Michael Cooper / Coore / Richard Daley / Jarrett / Willie Stewart	4:52
2.	"Come Together"	Clarke / Cooper / Coore / Daley / Jarrett / Stewart	3:02
3.	"Having a Party"	Clarke / Cooper / Coore / Daley / Jarrett / Stewart	5:07
4.	"Story's Been Told"	Clarke / Cooper / Coore / Daley / Jarrett / Stewart	7:08

== Personnel ==
- Bunny Rugs: Vocals
- Michael "Ibo" Cooper: Keyboards
- Steven "Cat" Coore: Lead guitar
- Irvin "Carrot" Jarrett: Percussions
- Richard "Richie" Daley: Bass
- Willie Stewart: Drums
- Produced by Third World
