= 96° in the Shade =

Studio album by Third World
- Released: 1977
- Genre: Reggae
- Length: 33:20
- Label: Island
- Producer: Third World

Third World chronology
Third World (1976)	96° in the Shade (1977)	Journey to Addis (1978)

96° in the Shade is the second album by the Jamaican reggae group Third World, released by Island Records in 1977.

The title track, “1865 (96 Degrees in the Shade)”, refers to the year of the Morant Bay rebellion, headed by the Baptist deacon and preacher Paul Bogle. Although the rebellion failed, the song makes clear that Bogle’s actions reverberated across Jamaican history. The song has “simmering, rootsy beat, subtly infectious melody, lovely guitar work and potent lyrics.”

== Reception ==
The album "was an enormous critical success in the U.K. and Europe, and spawned an all-time classic single in the title track," writes Steve Huey of AllMusic.

The album introduced two new band members, the new drummer Willie "Roots" Stewart and new lead singer William Clarke, aka Bunny Rugs.

== Track listing ==
Side one
No.	Title	Writer(s)	Length
1.	"Jah Glory"	William Clarke, Michael Cooper, Steven "Cat" Coore	5:13
2.	"Tribal War"	William Clarke, Michael Cooper, Steven "Cat" Coore, Richard Daley, Irvin Jarrett, Willie Stewart	3:46
3.	"Dreamland"	Bunny Livingston	3:35
4.	"Feel a Little Better"	William Clarke, Michael Cooper, Steven "Cat" Coore	3:49

Side two
No.	Title	Writer(s)	Length
1.	"Human Market Place"	William Clarke, Michael Cooper, Steven "Cat" Coore	4:32
2.	"Third World Man"	William Clarke, Michael Cooper, Steven "Cat" Coore, Richard Daley, Irvin Jarrett, Willie Stewart	3:31
3.	"1865 (96 Degrees in the Shade)"	Michael Cooper, Steven "Cat" Coore	4:27
4.	"Rhythm of Life"	Michael Cooper	4:13

== Personnel ==
Third World

- Bunny Rugs - vocals
- Michael "Ibo" Cooper - keyboards
- Steven "Cat" Coore - lead guitar
- Irvin "Carrot" Jarrett - percussions
- Richard "Richie" Daley - bass
- Willie Stewart - drums

with:

- Chris Wood - soprano saxophone on "Feel a Little Better"
- Donald "Satta" Manning - chant on "Rhythm of Life"
- Background noises on "Human Market Place" recorded at Coronation Market, Jamaica by Irvin "Carrot" Jarrett

Production

- Produced by Third World.
- Cover painting by Tony Wright.

== Charts ==
Chart performance for 96° in the Shade
Chart (2026)	Peak position
Greek Albums (IFPI)	81
