= Tony Wright (artist) =

British artist (born 1949)

Tony Wright (born 23 October 1949, in London), also known as Sue Ab Surd, is an artist who created album covers such as Bob Marley's Natty Dread and Traffic's The Low Spark of High Heeled Boys and others including Bob Dylan's Saved. His art work for The Low Spark of High Heeled Boys and Steve Winwood's Arc of a Diver were listed amongst Rolling Stone's 100 Classic Album Covers. The cover for The Low Spark of High Heeled Boys is part of the permanent collection of the Museum of Modern Art.

== Album art ==
- 1971 Traffic, The Low Spark of High Heeled Boys
- 1973 Traffic, Shoot Out at the Fantasy Factory
- 1973 The Meters, Cissy Strut
- 1973 Sharks, First Water
- 1973 Chris Stainton, Tundra
- 1974 Bob Marley, Natty Dread
- 1974 Jim Capaldi, Whale Meat Again
- 1975 Peter Skellern, Hard Times
- 1975 Fania All Stars, Salsa
- 1975 Kevin Ayers, Sweet Deceiver
- 1976 David Essex, Out on the Street
- 1976 Max Romeo, War Ina Babylon
- 1976 Third World, Third World
- 1976 Lee Perry, Super Ape
- 1976 Aswad
- 1976 Boxer, Bloodletting
- 1977 Martin Briley, Before and Beyond
- 1977 John Martyn, One World
- 1977 Third World, 96° In The Shade
- 1977 David Essex, Gold and Ivory
- 1977 Junior Murvin, Police and Thieves
- 1977 Jorge Ben, Tropical
- 1977 Go, Live from Paris
- 1978 Ijahman, Haile I Hymn
- 1978 Rico Rodriguez, Man from Wareika
- 1979 David Essex, Imperial Wizard
- 1979 Third World, Journey to Addis
- 1979 Ijahman, Are We a Warrior
- 1979 The B-52's, The B-52's
- 1980 Bob Dylan, Saved
- 1980 Black Uhuru, Sinsemilla
- 1980 Davitt Sigerson
- 1980 Steve Winwood, Arc of a Diver
- 1980 Marianne Faithfull, Broken English
- 1980 Cristina
- 1980 Suicide
- 1981 Kid Creole and the Coconuts, Fresh Fruit in Foreign Places
- 1982 Chic, Take It Off
- 1982 Steve Winwood, Talking Back to the Night
- 1983 Ramones, Subterranean Jungle
- 1983 Marianne Faithfull, A Child's Adventure
- 1984 Sly and Robbie, Language Barrier
- 1984 Ramones, Too Tough to Die
- 1985 Various Artists, Sun City
- 1986 Trouble Funk, Trouble Over Here Trouble Over There
- 1986 Tama Janowitz, Cannibal in Manhattan (novel)
- 1987 Sly and Robbie, Rhythm Killers
- 1987 Gary Windo, Deep Water
- 1987 Marianne Faithfull, Strange Weather
- 1988 Melissa Etheridge, Melissa Etheridge
- 1988 Allen Ginsberg
- 1989 The Buck Pets
- 1990 William S. Burroughs
- 1995 Jude Cole, I Don't Know Why I Act This Way
- 2001 Local H, Here Comes the Zoo
- 2001 Skindive
- 2001 Gigi
- 2002 Supreme Beings of Leisure, Divine Operating System

== Book illustration ==
- Angel: The Diary of a Mystic. 1976.
- Fantastic Woman: A Song of Songs. 1980
- Assisi, Francis of. Hymn of the Sun. 1990
- City. 1995
- Dance of Death: Forty Paintings, Forty Quotations. 2006

== Awards ==
- Benjamin Franklin Award. 1991. First Prize. Religion/Metaphysics/Spirituality.
- Catholic Press Association 1991 Book Award. First prize.
- Print Magazine. Design Award. 1996
- American Graphic Design Award 1997
- Drench Design Award.2005
- Design Greenproject Award. 2006
