= Time (Bunny Rugs album) =

Studio album by Bunny Rugs
- Released: September 11, 2012
- Genre: Reggae, lovers' rock
- Label: Raw Edge Productions/VPAL

Time is a studio album by Jamaican musician Bunny Rugs, the lead singer of reggae band Third World. The album is released on September 11, 2012, by Raw Edge Productions/VPAL.

Time is Bunny's sixth solo album and it contains 15 tracks. According to Bunny, Time is a mixture of lovers' rock and social commentary.

The album title Time came from Bunny's own belief which is, "if you don't have respect for time, you don't have respect for yourself." In an interview in April 2011, Bunny Rugs stated that he had already been working on the album for three years.

"Land We Love", this song shows that Bunny's tribute to his homeland Jamaica, its 50th year of independence. Not only reggae lovers, “It’s Time”, “Just Deny”, “We’ve Got The Formula” and “Settling Down”, these plaintive love songs in the album are attractive to soul aficionados as well.

== Track listing ==
No.	Title	Length
1.	"Just Can't Deny"	4:51
2.	"Heaven Sent - Dat Feelin'"	4:10
3.	"You're My Everything"	3:42
4.	"Neva Gonna Give Up"	3:36
5.	"Kurfew"	3:41
6.	"It's Time"	3:46
7.	"We've Got the Formula"	5:50
8.	"Settling Down"	3:40
9.	"Solutions"	4:02
10.	"Thinking Bout You"	2:48
11.	"Love Is Blind"	3:36
12.	"What Kinda Man"	5:04
13.	"Bed of Roses"	3:32
14.	"Don't Give Up"	3:53
15.	"Land We Love : Jamaica"	4:06
