= Serious Business =

Serious Business may refer to

- Serious Business (Johnny Winter album), 1985
- Serious Business (Third World album), 1989
- "Serious Business", a song from the album Uh-huh by John Cougar Mellencamp and the B-side of "Pink Houses"
- Serious Business, one of the earliest game developers on Facebook, acquired by Zynga in 2010
- Serious Business Records, a record label founded by Travis Harrison and Andy Ross
