= 11i =

11i may refer to:

- 11i (album), an album by The Supreme Beings of Leisure
- Oracle 11i, an Oracle Applications version
- WPA2, an international standard specifying security mechanisms for wireless networks

== See also ==
- IEEE 802.11i-2004, an international standard specifying security mechanisms for wireless networks
