= Mega Banton =

Jamaican dancehall deejay

- Born: Garth Alexander Williams; 1974 (age 50–51); Kingston, Jamaica
- Genres: Dancehall
- Years active: 1992–present

Mega Banton (born Garth Alexander Williams, 1974) is a Jamaican dancehall deejay who came to prominence in the early 1990s.

== Biography ==
Williams was born in Kingston, Jamaica, in 1973.

Inspired by the likes of Burro Banton and Buju Banton, and with a similar gruff style of delivery, he achieved international success in the early 1990s with singles such as "First Position", "Decision", "No Ninja, No Buju", and "Sound Boy Killing", working with the Black Scorpio team. He recorded a duet with Leroy Smart ("Mr. Want All"), and in 1994 courted controversy with his single "Money First", for which he was accused of encouraging women into a life of prostitution. When Garnett Silk died, Banton released the "A Tribute to Garnett Silk" single, along with Sattalite. In 1988 he had a combination hit with Barrington Levy with "She's Mine". In 1995 he made his major-label album debut with 1,000,000 Megwatts. He is still performing, well into the 2000s.

== Discography ==
- First Position (1992), Black Scorpio (reissued (2001) VP)
- Showcase (1993), VP (with Ricky General)
- New Year New Style (1995), Black Scorpio/Shanachie
- 1,000,000 Megawatts (1995), Relativity
