= General Degree =

- Also known as: Degree, Snapple Dapple
- Born: Cardiff Butt; Manchester, Jamaica
- Genres: Dancehall, reggae
- Occupation: Entertainer
- Years active: Early 1990s–present
- Labels: Size 8 Records
- Website: www.instagram.com/generaldegree1

Cardiff Butt, better known as General Degree (or simply Degree) and later as Snapple Dapple, is a Jamaican dancehall deejay and record producer.

== Biography ==
Born in Manchester, Jamaica, Degree worked as a tailor before beginning his career in music in the late 1980s, his stage name reflecting the influence of General Trees. He had success through the 1990s with singles such as "Mother Rule Pickney", "Granny", "Mr. Do It Nice", "When I Hold You Tonight", "Bodyguard", "Papa Lover", "Traffic Blocking", "Boom Boom", and "Inna Body". His lyrics are often sexually explicit and humorous, containing double entendres such as on his single "Pianist".

In 1997 he was featured on Richie Stephens' "Come Give Me Your Love", which reached number 61 on the UK Singles Chart.

He also has his own 'Size 8 Record' label. Since 2000 he has spent much of his time on production work, under the name 'Snapple Dapple'. In 2006 he launched his own 'Reh Geh' clothing range. In 2008 he was one of the judges in the 'Magnum Kings and Queens of Dancehall' contest. Since 2005 he has held the annual 'Manchester Fiesta' show.

His first album since 2007's Generally Speaking, Snapple Dapple Volume 1, was released in 2012, with a promotional tour of Europe following.

In January 2015 he released the one-drop reggae EP Feeling Irie.

== Discography ==
=== Albums ===
- Granny (1992), VP
- P'N'S (1994), VP
- Ninety Degrees (1994), Pipper/King Dragon
- Degree (1997), VP
- Bush Baby (1998), VP
- Fi Real (1999), Pretty Boy
- Yeah Man (2001), Greensleeves
- The General (2004), Size 8
- Generally Speaking (2007), Kingstone
- Snapple Dapple Volume 1 (2012)

Compilations

- Smash Hits (2002), Size 8

Split albums

- Battle Of The Generals (1990), King Dragon - with General Trees

=== EPs ===
- Feeling Irie (2015)

Money Language Refix (2022)
