= Gold (Garnett Silk album) =

Compilation album by Garnett Silk
- Released: August 22, 2000
- Recorded: 1987–1994
- Genres: Reggae, dancehall, lovers rock, ragga
- Length: 51:06
- Label: Jet Star
- Producers: Richard 'Bello' Blue, Danny Browne, Courtney Cole, Bobby "Digital", Donovan Germain, L. James, E.J. Robinson, Chuckie Million, Jack Scorpio, Garnett "Silk" Smith

Gold is a greatest hits compilation album of Garnett Silk's songs released post-posthumously by Jet Star. Released in 2000, the album contains some of Silk's most well known songs including: "Hello Africa", "Mama", "Oh Me, Oh My" and "Jah, Jah is the Ruler".

== Track listing ==
All lyrics are written by G. Smith.

No.	Title	Length
1.	"Hello Africa"	3:35
2.	"Necessity"	3:35
3.	"Mama"	3:50
4.	"Zion in a Vision"	3:37
5.	"Oh Me, Oh My"	3:31
6.	"Fill Us Up with Your Mercy"	3:42
7.	"Passing Judgement"	3:30
8.	"The Rod"	3:42
9.	"Gave You Everything"	3:42
10.	"Let's All Spread Love"	3:36
11.	"Jah, Jah Is the Ruler"	3:32
12.	"It's Growing"	3:38
13.	"Love Me Baby"	3:50
14.	"Lion Heart"	3:29

== Reception ==
AllMusic gave the album a good review and 4.5 stars, stating:

"The set bundles up a bumper crop of Garnett Silk's early hits and fan faves, kicking off with "Hello Africa," the artist's biggest single, and his first international smash" "Love songs light up the rest of the set, with the most magnificent a tribute to Silk's "Mama," an exuberant, heartfelt hit overseen by Courtney Cole. And love is everywhere, "It's Growing" by the minute; that sublime hit titled the singer's debut album, another masterpiece "Every number here is a winner, the backing's superb, the arrangements expertly enhancing the themes and Silk's vocals; the production's top-notch. This isn't all the Silk you need, but it's a great place to start"

— Jo-Ann Green of AllMusic
