= Third World (album) =

Studio album by Third World
- Released: 1976
- Studio: Strawberry Hill Studios, Jamaica
- Genre: Reggae
- Length: 38:36
- Label: Island
- Producer: Chris Blackwell

Third World chronology
Third World (1976)	96° In The Shade (1977)

Third World is the 1976 debut album of the Jamaican reggae group Third World.

The Allmusic review hails the album as “a brilliant debut” … “from a band whose desire was to infuse reggae with other influences, continuing a direction in Jamaican music that was perhaps best expressed by artists along the lines of Count Ossie and Ras Michael and the Sons of Negus.”

The album contains original material as well as cover versions of the Abyssinians’ classic song “Satta Massagana”” and Burning Spear's “Slavery Days”, from his album Marcus Garvey of the previous year.

A serious lead guitarist, "Cat" Coore, was said to be “a real rarity in Jamaican music of the period.”

== Track listing ==
Track listing in Discogs:

Side one
No.	Title	Writer(s)	Length
1.	"Satta Massagana"	Bernard Collins, Donald Manning, Lynford Manning	6:45
2.	"Kumina"	Traditional	0:35
3.	"Slavery Days"	Winston Rodney	7:45
4.	"Brand New Beggar"	Michael Cooper, Steven "Cat" Coore, Cornell Marshall	5:15

Side two
No.	Title	Writer(s)	Length
1.	"Cross Reference"	Michael Cooper, Steven "Cat" Coore, Richard Daley, Milton Hamilton, Irvin Jarrett, Cornell Marshall	2:10
2.	"Got To Get Along"	Michael Cooper, Steven "Cat" Coore, Cornell Marshall	4:40
3.	"Sun Don’t Shine"	The Clarks, Michael Cooper, Steven "Cat" Coore, Milton Hamilton, Cornell Marshall	6:20
4.	"Freedom Song"	Clint Brown	4:50

== Personnel ==
Third World

- Milton "Prilly" Hamilton - vocals
- Steven "Cat" Coore - lead guitar
- Richard "Richie" Daley - bass
- Michael "Ibo" Cooper - keyboards
- Cornell Marshall - drums
- Irvin "Carrot" Jarrett - percussions

== Production ==
- Produced by Chris Blackwell.
- Cover painting by Tony Wright.
