= Tony Rebel Meets Garnett Silk in a Dancehall Conference =

Studio album by Tony Rebel & Garnett Silk
- Released: January 1, 1994
- Recorded: 1993
- Genre: Reggae, lovers rock, roots reggae, dancehall
- Length: 72:12
- Label: Heartbeat Records
- Producer: Derrick Morgan, Chris Wilson

Tony Rebel chronology
Vibes of the Time (1993)	Tony Rebel Meets Garnett Silk in a Dancehall Conference' (1994)	If Jah (1997)

Garnett Silk chronology
Gold (1993)	Tony Rebel Meets Garnett Silk in a Dancehall Conference' (1994)	Lord Watch Over Our Shoulders (1994)

Garnett Silk & Tony Rebel chronology
Buju Banton Meets Garnett Silk and Tony Rebel (1993)	Tony Rebel Meets Garnet Silk in a Dancehall Conference (1994)

Tony Rebel Meets Garnett Silk in a Dancehall Conference is a collaboration studio album, by Tony Rebel and Garnett Silk. It was the second and final collaboration album between the two.

== Track listing ==
All tracks are written by P. Barrett & G. Smith except "Killing Me Softly"

No.	Title	Performing artist	Length
1.	"Jak & Jam Up"	Garnett Silk	3:25
2.	"Hurry Up and Come Deejay's"	Tony Rebel	3:34
3.	"Help the Poor and Needy" (ft. Tony Rebel)	Garnett Silk	5:06
4.	"Good Instruction"	Tony Rebel	3:35
5.	"Killing Me Softly With Her Song" (Roberta Flack cover)	Garnett Silk	4:28
6.	"Where Do The Broken Hearts Go?"	Garnett Silk	3:45
7.	"A No Nothing"	Garnett Silk	3:42
8.	"Dancehall Principal" (ft. Tony Rebel)	Garnett Silk	3:45
9.	"I Am A Musician"	Garnett Silk	3:27
10.	"Can't Tek It Inna Jail"	Tony Rebel	3:31
11.	"Yu See The Girls Dem" (ft. Anthony Selassie)	Garnett Silk	3:36
12.	"Killing Me Softly With Her Song" (Soul Mix)	Garnett Silk	4:28
13.	"Hasty Dub"	Garnett Silk	4:29
14.	"Dub Instruction"	Garnett Silk	4:16
15.	"Killer Dub"	Garnett Silk	4:26
16.	"Dub Hearted"	Garnett Silk	3:42
17.	"A No Dub"	Garnett Silk	3:33
18.	"Musical Dub"	Garnett Silk	3:26
19.	"Prisoners Dub"	Garnett Silk	3:18

== Reception ==
AllMusic gave the album a very positive review along with 4.5 stars stating:

"Garnett Silk has a booming, yet engaging and soulful voice, which he can also lower effectively. Tony Rebel is in the harsh, attacking, booming class alongside Buju Banton. While they're similar in their abilities to dominate an arrangement, there's enough disparity to make their duets delightful."

— AllMusic

Billboard also gave a fairly positive review saying that

"The exquisite singer-to-be [Silk] emerges on the cover of "Killing Me Softly," the sweet voice breaking through in all its glory" "Rebel already exhibits the maturity of the veteran toaster, which he is, although true recognition would not arrive until he moved on to Pavement the following year. Still, tracks like "Can't Tek It Inna Jail," with its rapid fire raps spewing across the grooves, showcases the verbal barrage that would send him racing up the charts" "The pair's duets are a potent reminder of their powerful live assaults; now Rebel's machine gun toasts, which pepper the platter, are met by Silk's sweet sing-song vocals, which warm the wax" " This is talent in its purest state, still solidifying and maturing, but already palpable in its presence, and a welcome addition to both artists' canons"

— Jo-Ann Green of Billboard magazine
