= Supreme Beings of Leisure (album) =

Studio album by Supreme Beings of Leisure
- Released: February 22, 2000
- Recorded: 2000
- Genre: Nu jazz; trip hop; pop
- Length: 44:48
- Label: Palm Pictures; Festival Mushroom

Supreme Beings of Leisure chronology
Supreme Beings of Leisure (2000)	Divine Operating System (2003)

Supreme Beings of Leisure is the debut studio album by electronic/trip hop group Supreme Beings of Leisure, released in 2000.

The album peaked at No. 29 on the Billboard Top Independent Albums chart.

== Critical reception ==
Professional ratings
Review scores
Source	Rating
AllMusic	4/5 stars
The Encyclopedia of Popular Music	4/5 stars
PopMatters	8/10
Rolling Stone	3/5 stars

Variety called the album "ambitious and frequently captivating." PopMatters called it "a largely successful, if derivative, melange of cultural and musical styles as diverse as the group's ethnic heritage." Exclaim! wrote that the album "is a pleasant enough American take on the trip-hop 'genre,' but it certainly doesn't advance the music or take risks with the sound."

== Track listing ==
1. "Never the Same" – 4:03
2. "Golddigger" – 4:11
3. "Last Girl on Earth" – 4:15
4. "Strangelove Addiction" – 5:04
5. "Ain't Got Nothin'" – 3:31
6. "Truth From Fiction" – 4:07
7. "You're Always the Sun" – 3:56
8. "Sublime" – 3:40
9. "Nothin' Like Tomorrow" – 4:43
10. "What's the Deal" – 3:48
11. "Under the Gun" – 3:30
12. "Naughty Boy" – 3:55 (Australia and New Zealand bonus track)
13. "Strangelove Addiction" (Q-Burns Abstract Message Remix) – 7:01 (Australia and New Zealand bonus track)

== Charts ==
Chart performance for Supreme Beings of Leisure
Chart (2000)	Peak position
Australian Albums (ARIA)	82
Australian Dance Albums (ARIA)	18
New Zealand Albums (RMNZ)	38
