= Divine Operating System =

Studio album by Supreme Beings of Leisure
- Released: September 10, 2002
- Genre: Electronic; disco; soul; R&B; pop; dance
- Length: 49:35
- Label: Palm Pictures
- Producer: Ramin Sakurai

Supreme Beings of Leisure chronology
Supreme Beings of Leisure (2000)	Divine Operating System (2002)	11i (2008)

Divine Operating System is the second studio album released by Supreme Beings of Leisure, an electronic/trip hop band, in 2002.

== Track listing ==
All tracks by Supreme Beings of Leisure

1. "Give Up" – 3:50
2. "Ghetto" – 4:22
3. "Catch Me" – 4:20
4. "Get Away" – 3:22
5. "Rock and a Hard Place" – 4:25
6. "Calamity Jane" – 5:19
7. "Divine" – 4:26
8. "Touch Me" – 4:11
9. "So Much More" – 5:54
10. "Freezer" – 4:25
11. "Perfect" – 5:01

=== Bonus DVD ===
1. "Give Up"
2. "Ghetto"
3. "Catch Me"
4. "Touch Me"

== Personnel ==
- Tony Wright – cover art
- Jason Arnold – mixing
- Flavia Cureteu – design
- DJ Swamp – scratching
- Jesse Gorman – assistant engineer
- Suzie Katayama – string arrangements, string conductor
- Lory Lacy – flute
- Bill Meyers – string arrangements, string conductor
- Andres Moreta – art direction
- Jimi Randolph – engineer, mixing
- Manoochehr Sadeghi – santur
- Ramin Sakurai – programming, multi instruments, producer, engineer, string arrangements, mixing, synthesizer strings
- Christine Sirois – assistant engineer
- Sheldon Strickland – bass, producer
- Rick Torres – guitar, programming
- Brad Wood – producer
