= Black Scorpio =

Jamaican sound system

Jack Scorpio
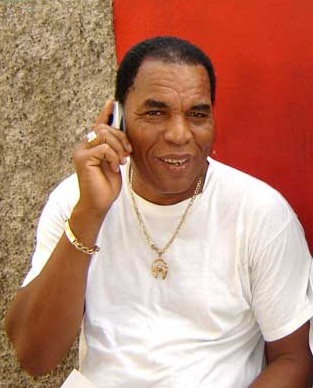
- Pictured in 2009

Background information
- Also known as: Black Scorpio
- Born: Maurice Johnson; Jamaica
- Origin: Kingston, Jamaica
- Genres: Reggae, dancehall
- Occupations: Sound system operator, record producer
- Years active: 1968–present
- Label: Black Scorpio

Black Scorpio is a Jamaican sound system and record label run by Maurice "Jack Scorpio" Johnson.

== History ==
Johnson started to operate a single turntable and speaker sound system in 1968 and started the Special I sound system in 1972, changing the name to Black Scorpio after the name caused friction in the area in which it was based, with the largely People's National Party-supporting locals suspecting sympathies with the Jamaica Labour Party due to its similarity to that party's slogan. Also known as 'The Horseman Sound' to the close association of Johnson (who owned racehorses) and deejays that worked on the sound system (General Trees and Lord Sassafrass) with horse racing, it rose to become one of the top sounds in Jamaica. Other deejays who worked on the system included Culture Lee, Shukashine, Barry Bak, and Lady G. Black Scorpio expanded into a record label in the early 1980s with a studio on Molynes Road in the Drewsland area of Kingston. Johnson had his first hit as producer in 1982 with "Pink Eye" by DJ Sassafrass, the pair having a bigger hit in 1985 with "Pocomania Jump", and Black Scorpio went on to become one of the top labels of the early era of ragga.

Black Scorpio productions include recordings by Bunny Rugs, Dennis Brown (More), Gregory Isaacs (Consequence), Frankie Paul (True, Start of a Romance), Garnett Silk, King Kong, Mafia & Fluxy, Papa San (Style and Fashion), Capleton, Bounty killer, Pliers, Mega Banton, Barrington Levy, Beenie Man, and Luciano (Serve Jah).

There are two sub-labels of Black Scorpio, Headley Avenue and Junior Scorpio, the latter named for Johnson's late son.

In 2010, Johnson was inducted into the International Reggae and World Music Awards (IRAWMA) Hall of Fame.
