= 11i (album) =

Studio album by Supreme Beings of Leisure
- Released: February 12, 2008
- Recorded: 2008
- Genres: Electronic; rock; trip hop
- Length: 52:45
- Label: Rykodisc
- Producer: Ramin Sakurai

Supreme Beings of Leisure chronology
Divine Operating System (2002)	11i (2008)

Professional ratings
Review scores
Source	Rating
AllMusic	3/5 stars
Clash	(favorable)
Okayplayer	(75/100)

11i is the third studio album by Supreme Beings of Leisure. It was released in 2008.

== Track listing ==
1. "The Light" – 4:48
2. "This World" – 3:26
3. "Mirror" – 5:11
4. "Swallow" – 4:48
5. "Good" – 4:04
6. "Pieces" – 4:07
7. "Angelhead" (featuring Lili Haydn) – 4:49
8. "Ride" – 5:07
9. "Oneness" (featuring Marty Friedman) – 3:01
10. "Everywhere" – 5:06
11. "Lay Me Down" – 8:18
