= Bunny Rugs =

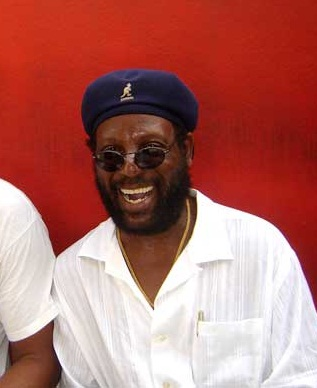
- Pictured in 2009

Background information
- Also known as: Bunny Scott
- Born: William Alexander Anthony Clarke; 6 February 1948; Mandeville, Jamaica
- Origin: Kingston, Jamaica
- Died: 2 February 2014 (aged 65) Orlando, Florida, United States
- Genres: Reggae, Reggae fusion, funk, disco, ska
- Instruments: Vocals, guitar
- Years active: Mid-1960s–2014
- Formerly of: Charlie Hackett and the Souvenirs; Inner Circle; Hugh Hendricks and the Buccaneers; The Bluegrass Experience; Bunny & Ricky; Third World

William Alexander Anthony "Bunny Rugs" Clarke, OD (6 February 1948 – 2 February 2014), also known as Bunny Scott, was the lead singer of Jamaican reggae band Third World as well as a solo artist. He began his career in the mid-1960s, and was also at one time a member of Inner Circle and half of the duo Bunny & Ricky.

== Biography ==
Born in Mandeville and raised on John's Lane in Kingston, Clarke's father was an Anglican preacher. He joined Charlie Hackett and the Souvenirs, the resident band at the Kittymat Club on Maxfield Avenue, in the mid-1960s before leading the early line-up of Inner Circle in 1969. A spell living in New York City followed from 1971 where he was a member of the dance band Hugh Hendricks and the Buccaneers, and later the Bluegrass Experience with Glen Adams, Eric Frater and Sparrow Martin. He returned to Jamaica in 1974 and recorded with Lee "Scratch" Perry at the Black Ark, initially as a backing singer, then with Leslie Kong's nephew Ricky Grant as the duo Bunny & Ricky, releasing singles such as "Freedom Fighter" and "Bushweed Corntrash", and also recording the solo album To Love Somebody (1975, credited as Bunny Scott). He was also a member of The Wild Bunch before returning to New York and taking over as lead singer of Third World from Milton "Prilly" Hamilton in 1976. With Third World he recorded the successful 96° in the Shade album, and was with the band until his death in early 2014 He returned to the Black Ark in 1977, contributing backing vocals (with Earl 16) to Yabby You's "Chant Down Babylon Kingdom".

As well as performing and recording with Third World, he continued to record as a solo artist, releasing the Jack Scorpio-produced Talking to You album in 1995, with guest contributions from Papa San, Cobra and General Trees.

His planned 2008 album Thinking Bout You was due to be released on 6 February, to coincide with Bob Marley Day celebrations, the date also being Clarke's birthday. He contributed to the Easy Star's Lonely Hearts Dub Band album in 2009, contributing a version of "Lovely Rita" recorded with U-Roy.

In 2012 he released the single "Land We Love", with profits going to the charities the Jamaican Children's Heart Fund (the charity for which he was a spokesman) and Chain of Hope. The single was taken from the album Time, released in September 2012. Later that year he received a Caribbean American Heritage Award for Outstanding Contribution to Reggae.

Health problems forced him to miss some of the shows on Third World's fortieth anniversary tour in 2013, and he confirmed that he had been diagnosed with cancer. In early 2014 he was hospitalized in Orlando, Florida, where he was treated for leukemia, and died on 2 February, 4 days before what would have been his 66th birthday. A memorial service later that month included tributes from Minister of Youth and Culture Lisa Hanna, Opposition Culture Spokesperson Olivia Grange, and former Prime Minister P.J. Patterson. He is survived by his wife and five children.

Clarke explained that his 'Bunny Rugs' nickname came from his grandmother calling him 'Bunny' as a child because he would "jump around the house like a rabbit" and from a member of the Third World road crew calling him 'Rugs' because of his liking for sleeping on the floor.

In 2016 it was announced that Clarke would be posthumously awarded the Order of Distinction (Officer Class) by the Jamaican government for his contribution to the country's music.

== Discography ==
See also Third World

=== Albums ===
- To Love Somebody (1975), Klik – as Bunny Scott
- Talking to You (1995), Greensleeves/Shanachie
- Bunny Rugs on Soul (2000), DFP Music
- What a World (2006), Elite Music Group
- I'm Sure (2007), CED
- Time (2012), VPAL

==== Compilations ====
- Timeless Classics (2011)

=== Singles ===
- "Let Love Touch Us Now"/"I Am I Said" (1982), Black Ark International – 12-inch, credited as 'Bunny Rags'
- "Be Thankful" (1974), Belleville International
- "War, War, War" (198?), Black Scorpio
- "Bridges Instead" (1990), Two Friends – 12-inch, Shabba Ranks featuring Bunny Rugs
- "Here Comes Rudie" (1991), Exterminator – Gregory Isaacs & Bunny Rugs
- "Rude Boy" (1991), Xterminator – Tony Rebel, Gregory Isaacs, and Bunny Rugs
- "If I Follow My Heart" (1993), Tuff Gong
- "I'm The Ghetto" (1993), Leggo
- "Stand By Me" (1994), Shanachie – Bunny Rugs & Papa San
- "Stand By Me" (1994), Black Scorpio – Papa San & Bunny Rugs, B-side of Papa San's "Girls Every Day"
- "Now That We've Found Love" (1995), Greensleeves – 12-inch
- "Now That We Found Love" (1995), Black Scorpio – featuring Sean Paul
- "Now That We Found Love" (1995), Shanachie
- "Apartheid No!"
- "In Love Again" (2002), Bernard Hall/ Chad Supreme Records
- "I'll Be There" (2002), Joe Frasier
- "What a World" (2004), Raw Edge
- "Marcus Garvey" (2004), Mister Tipsy
- "Writings on the Wall" (2005), Elogic Music Group – Wayne Marshall & Bunny Rugs
- "Now That We've Found Love" (2006), CED – CD maxi single
- "World Today" (2007), Hyper-Active Entertainment
- "Down in the Ghetto" (2007), Taxi – Bounty Killer & Bunny Rugs
- "Satamassagana" (20??), Coptic Lion – featuring Tappa Zukie
- Excerpts from the album Time EP (2011)
- "Big May" (2012), Black Swan/Trojan
- "Land We Love" (2012)

==== With Bunny & Ricky ====
- "Freedom Fighter" (1974), Black Art
- "Bushweed Corntrash" (1975), Black Art

==== With Marcia Griffiths ====
- "Really Together" (2010), Marcia Griffiths and Friends
- "Sense Of Purpose" (2010), Marcia Griffiths and Friends
- "It's Not Funny" (2010), Marcia Griffiths and Friends
