= Garnett Silk =

Jamaican reggae musician (1966-1994)

Garnet Silk

Background information
- Born: Garnet Damion Smith; 2 April 1966
- Origin: Manchester, Jamaica
- Died: 9 December 1994 (aged 28) Mandeville, Jamaica
- Genres: Reggae, dancehall
- Years active: late 1970s–1994
- Labels: VP, Greensleeves, Heartbeat, Atlantic, Penthouse

Garnet Silk (born Garnet Damion Smith; 2 April 1966 – 9 December 1994) was a Jamaican reggae musician and Rastafarian, known for his diverse, emotive, powerful and smooth voice. During the early 1990s he was hailed as a rising talent, however his career was ended by his early death in 1994, while attempting to save his mother from her burning house.

== Biography ==
=== Little Bimbo ===
Smith was born in Manchester, Jamaica. His musical career began at the age of twelve, when he performed under the name Little Bimbo. During the 1980s he worked as a deejay on sound systems such as Conquering Lion, Soul Remembrance, Pepper's Disco, Stereophonic, and Destiny Outernational (where he first met Tony Rebel). He recorded his first track in 1985, but it would be two years later before his first single, "Problem Everywhere" was released. An album of material from this period (Journey) was later released. In 1988, he joined Sugar Minott's Youth Promotion label, releasing "No Disrespect", and working regularly with Tony Rebel, Smith now being billed simply as 'Bimbo'. The pair began performing as a duo around the sound systems to much acclaim. The Garnett Silk Meets the Conquering Lion: A Dub Plate Selection album dates from about this time and features a clutch of exclusive recordings the DJ cut for the sound system from the mid-1980s through the end of the decade. Rebel, a Rastarfari, eventually converted Smith to his religion with the help of dub poet Yasus Afari, a close friend of both the DJs.

=== Singing career ===
In 1989, at the suggestion of veteran singer Derrick Morgan, Smith turned from deejaying to singing, with a recording session at Bunny Lee's studio with Rebel, including tracks recorded separately, as a duo, and with Anthony Selassie, and he began working under his real name. The Heartbeat label's Tony Rebel Meets Garnett Silk in a Dancehall Conference compiled these early Morgan-overseen recordings. The success of this session led him to continue as a singer, going on to work with producers King Tubby, Prince Jammy, and Donovan Germain, before signing a two-year contract with Steely & Clevie in 1990, recording an album's worth of songs for them. It was the production duo who decided to change his name to Garnet Silk, in reference to his smooth voice. Only one of the tracks recorded during this period, "We Can Be Together", a duet with Chevelle Franklin, was actually released at the time, and discouraged by this, he returned to Manchester and threw himself into songwriting, often in partnership with an old friend, Anthony "Fire" Rochester.

Another encounter with Tony Rebel brought an introduction to Courtney Cole, owner of the Roof International label. Silk recorded songs at the producer's Ocho Rios studio, amongst them were the future hits "Mama," "Seven Spanish Angels," and a cover of the Johnny Nash hit "I Can See Clearly Now". Roof International posthumously bundled up these early singles and other material recorded at this time for the Nothing Can Divide Us album, that the VP label picked up for release in the US.

By 1992, Silk was in Kingston in the studio with producer Bobby Digital, recording his debut album It's Growing. Split between deeply cultural themes, spiritual songs, and romantic numbers, the album went on to become one of the best selling in Jamaica that year, and he had his first major hit single with "Hello Mama Africa" (produced by Richard "Bello" Bell) for the Star Trail label, which was Silk's first international hit, and topped the reggae chart in Britain.

Over the next two years, the singer recorded with most of the major name producers on the island, both on his own and in partnership with Tony Rebel. He cut a swathe of songs with King Jammy, including "Fill Us Up With Your Mercy" and "Lord Watch Over Our Shoulders". The latter track titled a 1994 compilation released by the Greensleeves label in the UK and boasted seven Jammy cuts and a clutch of hits for other producers.

1993's Gold, released by the UK Charm label, bundled up more hits from this period. Amongst them was "Zion in a Vision", a Jamaican number one cut with producer Jack Scorpio, as well as "Hey Mama Africa". He also recorded for Sly & Robbie, including the religious "Thank You, Jah" and the haunting "Green Line". But the pace was becoming too much and Silk collapsed during a show at the Ritz in New York City, suffering from low blood pressure and exhaustion. The exhausted singer was forced to cancel all his scheduled appearances for the next six months, most crucially of all, what would have been his debut at Reggae Sumfest. However, Silk bounced back in 1994 and set back to work. In a show of good grace, he rejoined Steely & Clevie and cut the "Love Is the Answer" single, another hit. "Fight Back," produced by Richie Stephens, was next up. By then, the singer was ready to re-take the stage, which he did with a vengeance, headlining that year's Reggae Sumfest and Reggae Sunsplash festivals. His set at the latter event was captured for the Live at Reggae Sunsplash 1994 album, released in 1999 by the Tabou1 label. Silk's backing band was Jahpostles, who originally formed in the late 1970s.

=== Death ===
Having signed an international distribution deal with Atlantic Records, Silk now entered Tuff Gong studios with producer Errol Brown and the cream of Jamaica's session men (including Aston Barrett, Sly & Robbie, Tyrone Downie, Earl "Chinna" Smith, and Uziah "Sticky" Thompson), to begin work on his second album. He recorded ten songs and the album was nearing completion when he went home to visit his mother. Silk had borrowed a pair of guns from his attorney after his home had been burglarized, but had no idea how to use them. Sitting with a couple of friends at his mother's house in Mandeville, Jamaica, on 9 December, one offered to show him how they worked, at which point the gun accidentally misfired, hitting a propane tank and setting the house ablaze. The singer, his friends, and his two brothers made it out safely, only to discover that Silk's mother was still trapped inside. Silk rushed back into the house to save her, but it was too late and both were lost in the fire.

=== Posthumous ===
Silk's music has been kept alive by several tributes, including Macka B's "Tribute to Garnett Silk" and the Earth Day concert, and numerous compilation albums, including two collections of his dubplates, Kilimanjaro Remembers Garnett Silk (Jam Down, 1999) and Rule Dem (Trojan/Sanctuary 2006).

In 2000, Atlantic finally released The Definitive Collection, a two-CD set showcasing the ten tracks the singer had recorded during sessions for his unfinished second album.

Jet Star also released a greatest hits compilation album, Gold in 2000. The album contains some of Silk's most well known songs including: "Hello Africa", "Mama", "Oh Me, Oh My" and "Jah, Jah is the Ruler".

Silk's son Garnet Smith Jr. has followed him into a career in music.

Silk's nephew Anthony Cruz recorded a tribute album in 2013, featuring cover versions of fifteen of Silk's songs.

== Releases ==
=== Albums ===
- It's Growing (1992) VP
- 100% Silk (1993) VP
- Gold (1993) Charm
- Buju Banton Meets Garnett Silk and Tony Rebel (1993) Rhino (with Buju Banton and Tony Rebel)
- Love Is The Answer (1994) VP
- Lord Watch Over Our Shoulders (1994) Greensleeves
- Tony Rebel Meets Garnett Silk in a Dance Hall Conference (1994) Heartbeat
- Nothing Can Divide Us (1995) VP
- Journey (1996) VP
- Reggae Max (1996) Jet Star
- Garnet Silk and the Superstars in Zion (1996) Rhino Records
- Give I Strength (1999) VP
- Killamanjaro Remembers (1999) Jamdown
- Live at Reggae Sunsplash 1994 (1999) Tabou
- Collector's Series (1999) Heartbeat
- Garnett Silk Meets the Conquering Lion: a Dub Plate Selection (2000) Conquering Lion
- The Definitive Collection (2000) Atlantic
- The Definitive Collection (2001) Atlantic (Two-CD edition)
- Legends of Reggae Vol.5 (2001) Artists Only
- This Sound Leads The Way (2001) Rhino (Garnett Silk & The DJs)
- Silky Mood (1995) VP
- The Very Best of Garnett Silk – Gold (2002) Jet Star
- Reggae Anthology: Music Is The Rod (1994) VP
- Rule Dem (2006) Trojan

=== DVD appearances ===
- Garnet Silk Earth Vibes 1994 (2003) DVD
- Garnett Silk and Friends (2002) MVD
- Golden Voices of Reggae (2005) Island MVD
