= Supreme Beings of Leisure =

Electronic/trip hop band

- Origin: Los Angeles, California, United States
- Genres: Electronica; trip hop; lounge
- Years active: 1998–present
- Label: Independent
- Members: Geri Soriano-Lightwood; Ramin Sakurai; Rick Torres
- Past members: Kiran Shahani; Rick Torres
- Website: www.sbleisure.com

Supreme Beings of Leisure (SBL) are an electronic/trip hop band from Los Angeles, California. Current members of SBL are singer/songwriter Geri Soriano-Lightwood, multi-instrumentalist/producer Ramin Sakurai, and guitarist/programmer Rick Torres. SBL was formed from the remains of the band Oversoul 7 in 1998 when they signed to Palm Pictures.

== History ==
In 1996, Oversoul 7 formed with singer Geri Soriano-Lightwood, Ramin Sakurai, bassist Kiran Shahani, and guitarist Rick Torres, and released "Nothing Like Tomorrow" and "What's the Deal" on two compilations on the Moonshine Music dance label. After these Moonshine releases, Oversoul 7 signed a demo deal with A&M Records, recording "Truth From Fiction", "Never the Same", and "Last Girl on Earth", all of which ended up on the band's self-titled debut album, released on the Palm Pictures label. This first Supreme Beings of Leisure album sold over 250,000 units with little promotional touring. Instead, SBL opted to use the internet to market and promote the album, being the first band to do a "Virtual Internet Tour", and among the first to use Flash animation for their videos. Supreme Beings of Leisure peaked at #47 on the Billboard Heatseekers chart according to allmusic.com, and was in the top 100 of the Trip-Hop Dance & DJ music category according to Amazon.com sales ranking.

After the release of their debut album, the band split, leaving Geri and Ramin as the main members of SBL. With this lineup, they released the second SBL album, Divine Operating System, in 2003. This peaked at #29 on the Billboard Heatseekers chart, #9 on the Top Electronic Albums chart, and #23 on the Top Independent Albums chart (all according to allmusic.com).

In 2003, SBL decided to leave Palm Pictures, taking a two-year hiatus, while releasing various remixes and appearing on other artists' albums during this period.

Supreme Beings of Leisure's third major album, 11i, was released on February 12, 2008, by Rykodisc Records. Aiming to create a richer, fuller sound than on SBL's first two releases, Geri and Ramin welcomed their touring band into the studio to collaborate on some tracks: Sheldon Strickland (bass), Geoff Brandin (guitar), and Jason Graham (drums). They also broadened their sound with guest musicians including string arranger Scott Tibbs (who has worked with Beyoncé and Mary J. Blige), turntablist DJ Swamp (Beck, Crystal Method, Morcheeba), violinist Lili Haydn and Megadeth guitarist Marty Friedman.

SBL has earned favorable notices in Rolling Stone, the New York Times, Details, Interview, Elle, Wired, Billboard, Keyboard and Seventeen. They have sold more than 300,000 records.

== Songs featured in television and film ==
Year	Song	Film/Show	Notes
2000	"Strangelove Addiction"	Shadow Hours	
2000	"Secret Agent Man"	Secret Agent Man	Cover used as Opening Theme
2001	"Golddigger"	Class Warfare	
2001	"Never the Same"	Soul Survivors	
2002	"Strangelove Addiction"	"Do it for Uncle Mannie"	
2002	"Golddigger"	New Best Friend	
2002	"Golddigger"	Igby Goes Down	
2002	"Never the Same"	Just a Kiss	
2003	"Give Up"	Fastlane	Episode: 1.11
2003	"Under the Gun"	The Animatrix	Segment: "A Detective Story"
2003	"Strangelove Addiction"	National Lampoon's Barely Legal	
2003	"Divine"	"Gay Hollywood"	Documentary
2004	"Rock and a Hard Place"	Veronica Mars	Episode: 1.3
2005	"Under the Gun"	Las Vegas	Episode: 2.15
2005	"Ghetto"	Must Love Dogs	
2016	"Golddigger"	Better Call Saul	Episode: 2.1

== Discography ==
=== Albums ===
List of albums, with selected details and chart positions
Title	Album details	Peak chart positions			
Title	Album details	US Dance	US Heat.	US Ind.	AUS
Supreme Beings of Leisure	Released: February 22, 2000; Label: Palm; Format: CD	—	47	29	82
Divine Operating System	Released: September 10, 2002; Label: Palm; Format: CD	9	—	23	—
11i	Released: February 12, 2008; Label: Rykodisc; Format: CD	9	32	—	—
22	Released: February 10, 2023; Label: Leisurephonic Records; Format: LP, Digital	—	—	—	—
"—" denotes releases that did not chart.

=== Singles ===
List of singles, with selected chart positions
Title	Year	Peak chart positions	Album
Title	Year	US Dance	Album
"Strangelove Addiction"	1999	40	Supreme Beings of Leisure
"Divine"	2002	9	Divine Operating System
"Ghetto"	2003	5	Divine Operating System
"Full Circle"	2022	—	"22"
"Contender"	2022	—	"22"
"Body"	2022	—	"22"
