= Serious Business (Third World album) =

Studio album by Third World
- Released: 1989
- Genre: Reggae
- Label: Mercury

Third World chronology
Hold on to Love (1987)	Serious Business (1989)	Rock the World (1990)

Serious Business is an album by the Jamaican band Third World, released in 1989. "Forbidden Love" was the first single. Third World supported the album with a North American tour.

The album peaked at No. 107 on the Billboard 200. It was nominated for a Grammy Award for "Best Reggae Recording".

== Production ==
The album contains covers of "It's the Same Old Song" and "Keep Your Head to the Sky". Daddy-O rapped on "Forbidden Love". Kenny Gamble coproduced "Take This Song", which features singers from the musical Sarafina! The Brecker Brothers appeared on several tracks. The title track is, in part, about apartheid in South Africa.

== Critical reception ==
Professional ratings
Review scores
Source	Rating
AllMusic	2.5/5 stars
Chicago Tribune	3/4 stars
The Encyclopedia of Popular Music	3/5 stars
MusicHound World: The Essential Album Guide	2.5/5 stars

The Chicago Tribune wrote that "the band continues to use strong strains of rock, soul and now rap and to highlight glossy pop production values." Newsday noted that the album "tries to be in so many places at once that it would be a mess if the band weren't so versatile, its vision of crossover dreams so clear."

The Boston Globe determined that "the group's bouncy 'reggae lite' files the genre's rough edges and leaves a smooth, palatable dose of music worth bouncing to." The Atlanta Journal-Constitution concluded that Serious Business "continues Third World's eclectic tradition of combining the old and the new, mixing elements from the United States, Africa and the Caribbean." The Wisconsin State Journal called it the band's best album.

AllMusic wrote that "'Reggae Ambassador', both the vocal and dub version, stands out as the album's most creative moment, showcasing Third World's easygoing melodies and fun-loving spirit."

== Track listing ==
No.	Title	Length
1.	"Forbidden Love"
2.	"It's the Same Old Song"
3.	"Reggae Ambassador"
4.	"D.J. Ambassador"
5.	"Keep Your Head to the Sky"
6.	"Take This Song"
7.	"Love Will Always Be There"
8.	"Serious Business"
9.	"Never Say Never"
10.	"We the People"
11.	"Theme from the Underdog"
12.	"Theme from the Underdog (Rap Version)"
13.	"Take This Song (Reprise)"
