= General Trees =

- Born: Amos Eughsha Edwards; 13 December 1960 (age 65)
- Origin: Kingston, Jamaica
- Genres: Reggae
- Years active: 1980s–present

Amos Eughsha Edwards (born 13 December 1960) better known by his stage name General Trees, is a Jamaican dancehall deejay who was considered one of the most popular deejays of the 1980s, best known for his hits in the latter half of the decade.

== Biography ==
Born in Drews Land, Kingston, on 13 December 1960, General Trees is widely regarded as the best Jamaican speed rapper of his era, the "fast style" of delivery commonly accepted as arriving in Jamaica from the UK, through London-born Phillip Papa Levi. In his early years after working as a shoemaker in his father's shop, he first found fame as a sound system star, working on Maurice Johnson's Black Scorpio system, which he had followed since the 1970s, his brother having preceded him as a deejay on the system. His name was given to him by Barry G, who thought he sounded like "a General with three voices in one". His fellow deejay Lord Sassafrass was known as "The Horseman", with the Black Scorpio system also known as the "Horseman" sound system, and when Trees joined he was known as "the younger horseman" and dressed as a jockey to perform.

When Johnson opened his own studio, also named Black Scorpio, he began producing recordings, including those by artists that had performed with his sound system, including Trees and Lord Sassafrass. General Trees' had a string of hits followed, including "Heel And Toe", "Monkey And Ape", "Ghost Rider", and "Crucifixion", although his best-remembered song is "Mini Bus", which lamented the demise of the "jolly bus", and which was awarded the title "Song Of The Year" in 1986 from the Jamaica Broadcasting Corporation. The award raised his profile and he went on to record for a variety of producers in Jamaica.

Further hits followed with "Gone A Negril" (No. 2 in 1986) and "Calling All Higglers", and he contributed to a "clash" album, Battle Of The Generals, that featured versions of "Lambada" and "Think Twice". Trees also recorded combination hits including "Coke Pipe" with Fancy Black, and "Nightmare" with Little John. In the early 1990s he again worked with Johnson, who also acted as his manager, but a falling-out between the two led Trees to work for other producers. Although he never repeated his earlier popularity, he had some success with "Eye Nah See", "Great Jamaican Jockeys" and "Goodie Goodie". He was less active during the late 1990s, although he recorded "Lik Him But Nuh Kill Him" for Linval Edwards in 1999. After that he was largely silent until he reunited again with Johnson in 2005, recording new songs including "Run di Place Again", "Mother of the Land", and "She Says She Loves Me". A tour of Europe with the Black Scorpio sound system followed in December 2005. He then began working with the Stur-Gav sound system. In late-2019, Trees suffered numerous strokes that has hindered his vocal performance (specifically vocal-cord paresis).

== Discography ==
- Heart, Mind & Soul (1985)
- Ghost Rider (1985), Sunset
- The Younger Horseman (1985), Sunset
- Negril (1986), Black Scorpio
- Nuff Respect (1987), Shanachie
- Battle Of The Generals (1987), King Dragon
- A Reggae Calypso Encounter (1987), Rohit
- Ragga Ragga Raggamuffin (1988), JA
- Kingstonian Man (1988), CSA Records
- Everything So So (1990), World
- Reggae Calypso Encounter (1990), Rohit (Yellowman & General Trees)
