= Third World (band) =

Jamaican reggae band

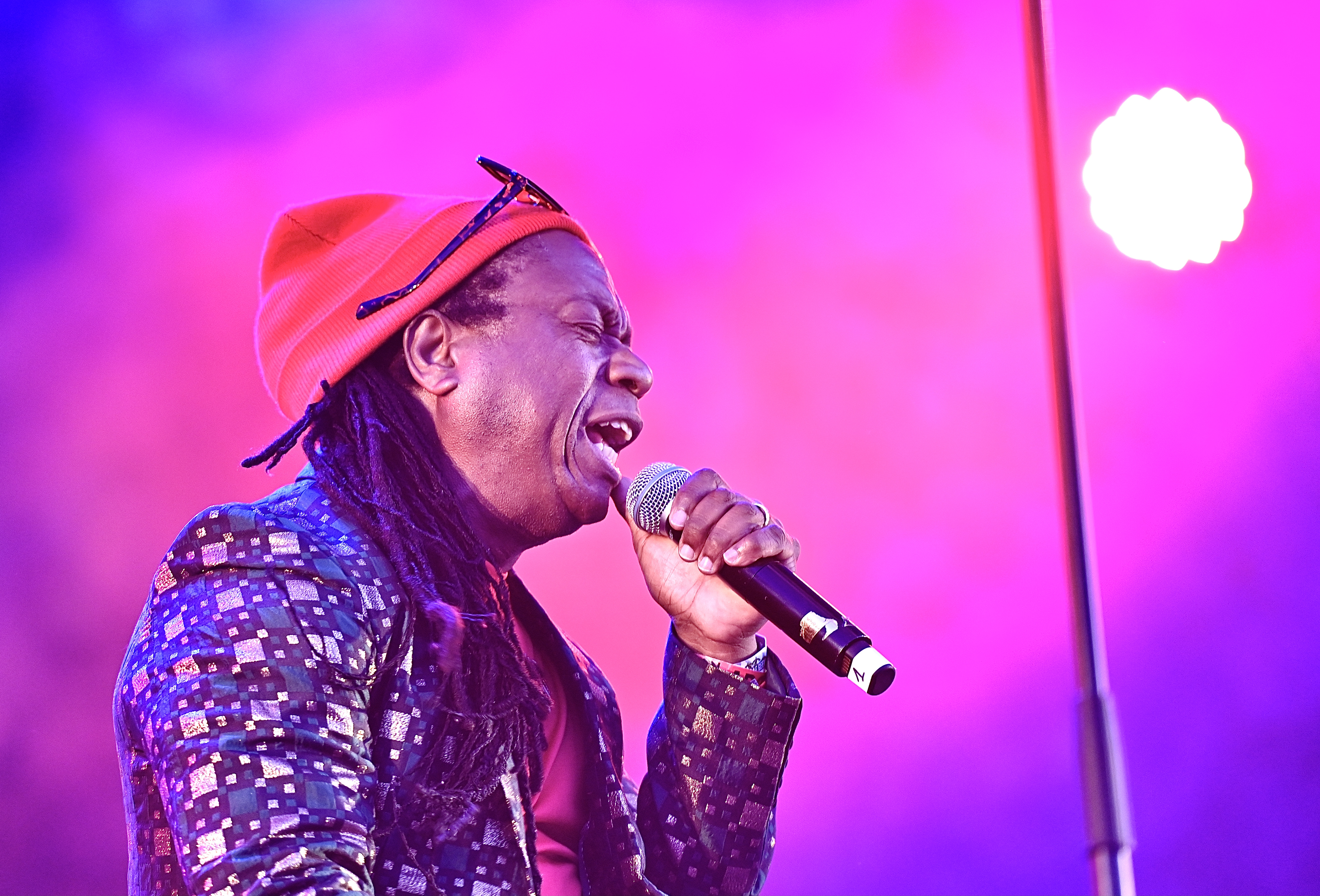
- Third World performing at Reggae Geel 2022

Background information
- Origin: Kingston, Jamaica
- Genres: Reggae fusion
- Years active: 1973–present
- Labels: Cleopatra, Island, Columbia, Mercury, Third World Music Group
- Members: Richard "Richie" Barr; Richard Daley; Tony "Ruption" Williams; Norris "Noreiga" Webb; AJ "Bobocelli" Brown
- Past members: Stephen "Cat" Coore; Michael "Ibo" Cooper; Irvin "Carrot" Jarrett; Carl Barovier; Milton "Prilly" Hamilton; Bunny Rugs; Willie Stewart; Rupert "Gypsy" Bent III; Leroy "Baarbe" Romans; Mikel Wallace; Herbie Harris; Robbie Lynn; Pablo Stewart; Maurice Gregory
- Website: thirdworldband.com

Third World is a Jamaican reggae fusion band formed in 1973. Their sound is influenced by soul, funk and disco. Although it has undergone several line-up changes, Richard Daley has been a constant member of the band since its inception in 1973.

== History ==
=== 1970s ===
Third World started when keyboard player Michael "Ibo" Cooper and guitarist (and cellist) Stephen "Cat" Coore (son of former Deputy Prime Minister David Coore), who had originally played in The Alley Cats and then Inner Circle, subsequently left to form their own band along with Inner Circle singer Milton "Prilly" Hamilton. They recruited bassist Richard Daley, formerly of Ken Boothe's band and Tomorrow's Children, and added drummer Carl Barovier and former Inner Circle percussionist Irvin "Carrot" Jarrett before making their live debut in early 1974.

After recording some tracks with Geoffrey Chung which went unreleased, the band's first single was the self-produced "Railroad Track" (1974). In their early days they played primarily in Kingston's hotels and nightclubs and (along with The Wailers) supported The Jackson Five when they played at the Jamaican National Stadium.

They were soon signed by Island Records and toured Europe with The Wailers. The band's self-titled debut album was released in 1976. The album included a cover of "Satta Massagana", originally performed by The Abyssinians, which became a local hit. Hamilton and Cornell Marshall (who had replaced Barovier earlier) were replaced by two more former Inner Circle members, singer William "Bunny Rugs" Clarke and drummer Willie Stewart, before the recording of their second album, 96° in the Shade (1977), which included several local hits. Notable among its eight tracks were "1865 (96° in the Shade)", a reference to the 1865 Morant Bay rebellion, "Rhythm of Life" and the album's only cover, "Dreamland", written by Bunny Wailer. They played in front of 80,000 people at the Smile Jamaica festival in 1976.

In 1977, the band collaborated with psychiatrist Frederick Hickling on the Explanitations show that was performed at Kingston's Little Theatre early the following year.

=== 1980s ===
Third World's greatest success came in the late 1970s and early 1980s, peaking with their cover version of The O'Jays' "Now That We Found Love" from their third album Journey to Addis. After its initial recording, the single was remixed at the behest of Island Records Special Projects division head, Alex Masucci, with new vocals and an uptempo beat. "Now That We Found Love" became a hit single on both sides of the Atlantic in 1978, reaching the top 10 in the UK. Journey to Addis became a top thirty hit album in the UK.

They had first met Stevie Wonder in Jamaica in 1976, and the single prompted him to perform with them at the Reggae Sunsplash festival in 1981 in the wake of Bob Marley's death, playing his tribute to Marley, "Master Blaster". Third World went on to perform several times at the festival, and they also took part in the "Reggae Sunsplash USA" tour in 1985. Wonder also wrote, along with Melody A McCully, their 1982 hit "Try Jah Love", which brought them further exposure in North America. They were also guests during the third season of SCTV.

In 1983, Third World had crossover success on the UK jazz-funk scene with their reggae single "Lagos Jump" largely thanks to Robbie Vincent and Jeff Young who played the 12-inch version on their Radio London shows. The track also became popular on the London club scene and in particular at Flicks in Dartford.

Telstar Records released a double-album compilation in 1983 which collected up all the mainstream club extended versions and remixes by artists and groups that had enjoyed relatively good UK chart success between 1981 and 1983. Entitled In the Groove, the compilation's lead track on Part Two was Third World's extended version of "Dancing on the Floor (Hooked on Love)". The track had originally been released in 1981 in 7-inch edited and 12-inch extended versions, and included on Third World's Rock the World album. With the release of the Telstar compilation, this brought about an upsurge of interest in Third World's dancefloor output and certainly paved the way for the next two years recordings with Columbia Records (CBS).

In 1985, the group's focus steered by a shifting music scene, brought about a stylistic change in musical direction with the release of "Sense of Purpose". The single was released as a 7-inch edit and 12-inch extended version and later was reissued as a Shep Pettibone club remix. Whilst the single was popular, it only made the lower ends of the UK charts. The 12-inch extended version was released with an instrumental plus the full length version of their 1983 crossover hit "Lagos Jump" which almost certainly boosted the sales of "Sense of Purpose".

In the same year, "Now That We've Found Love" returned to the UK charts again as Paul Hardcastle decided to release a club remix, similar to his D-Train remix, putting the Hardcastle signature sound of electronic keyboards on the track and reverbing the opening vocal. Whilst the remix was a UK hit, the remix had seemingly lost its reggae roots and the Hardcastle remix has since largely been forgotten in the decades that have followed. The result being that most DJs and radio stations have returned to the original reggae version.

Amid claims of artistic differences, "Carrot" split from the band in the mid-1980s. The resulting five-piece band then went on to record more commercial albums such as Sense of Purpose, Reggae Ambassador, Forbidden Love, and Committed.

Their version of "Now That We've Found Love" was used as the basis of Heavy D's 1991 hit rap version. In 1992, they returned to work with Stephen Stewart and Geoffrey Chung on the album Committed.

=== 2000s-present ===
Despite several more line-up changes, including the departures of Cooper and Stewart, and a decline in mainstream success, the band is still recording and performing up to the present day, including in front of a television audience at the Cricket World Cup 2007 Opening Ceremony in Trelawny.

In 2008 the band received a lifetime achievement award from Charles Drew University.

In January 2013, the group was awarded a Lifetime Achievement Award at the Jamaica Jazz and Blues Festival in Montego Bay as they celebrated their 40th year in music. Throughout 2013, the group completed a 40th anniversary world tour. Illness forced Clarke to miss the European shows, with AJ Brown standing in as lead vocalist. Clarke later died on 2 February 2014 in a hospital in Orlando, Florida, while battling cancer. Brown was announced as Bunny Rugs' permanent replacement.

Their 21st album, Under the Magic Sun, was released in June 2014 on Cleopatra Records, featuring vocals from past members, including Bunny Rugs, Brown, Coore, and Maurice Gregory.

Irvin "Carrot" Jarrett died on 31 July 2018, aged 69.

The group's 2019 album More Work to be Done received a nomination for a Grammy Award in the Best Reggae Album category, their eighth nomination in the category.

Michael "Ibo" Cooper died on 12 October 2023, aged 71.

Milton "Prilly" Hamilton died on 17 February 2025, aged 74.

Stephen "Cat" Coore died on 18 January 2026, aged 69.

== Musical style ==
While the band played roots reggae, they have also incorporated other styles into their music, and it was the initial influence of The Wailers that prompted the formation of the band to take on a new direction that combined reggae with other genres. The pop-oriented sound has given rise to criticism of the band over the years, with reggae purists uncomfortable with their incorporation of American soul and R&B into their sound. The band have played also folk-pop, hard rock, bossa nova, rap, light pop-jazz, doo-wop and calypso. Their style has been described as reggae fusion. Bunny Rugs described the band's sound: "Strictly a reggae band, no. Definitely a reggae band, yes." Cat Coore said of their music: "The hybrid of various types of music is a natural thing because, by growing up in Jamaica, we know the direct roots of reggae and ska. At the same time we live in a country where you get to hear Chuck Berry, Fats Domino and all the R&B artists." Bassist Richard Daley said "we took roots reggae music and put branches on top of it".

== Members ==
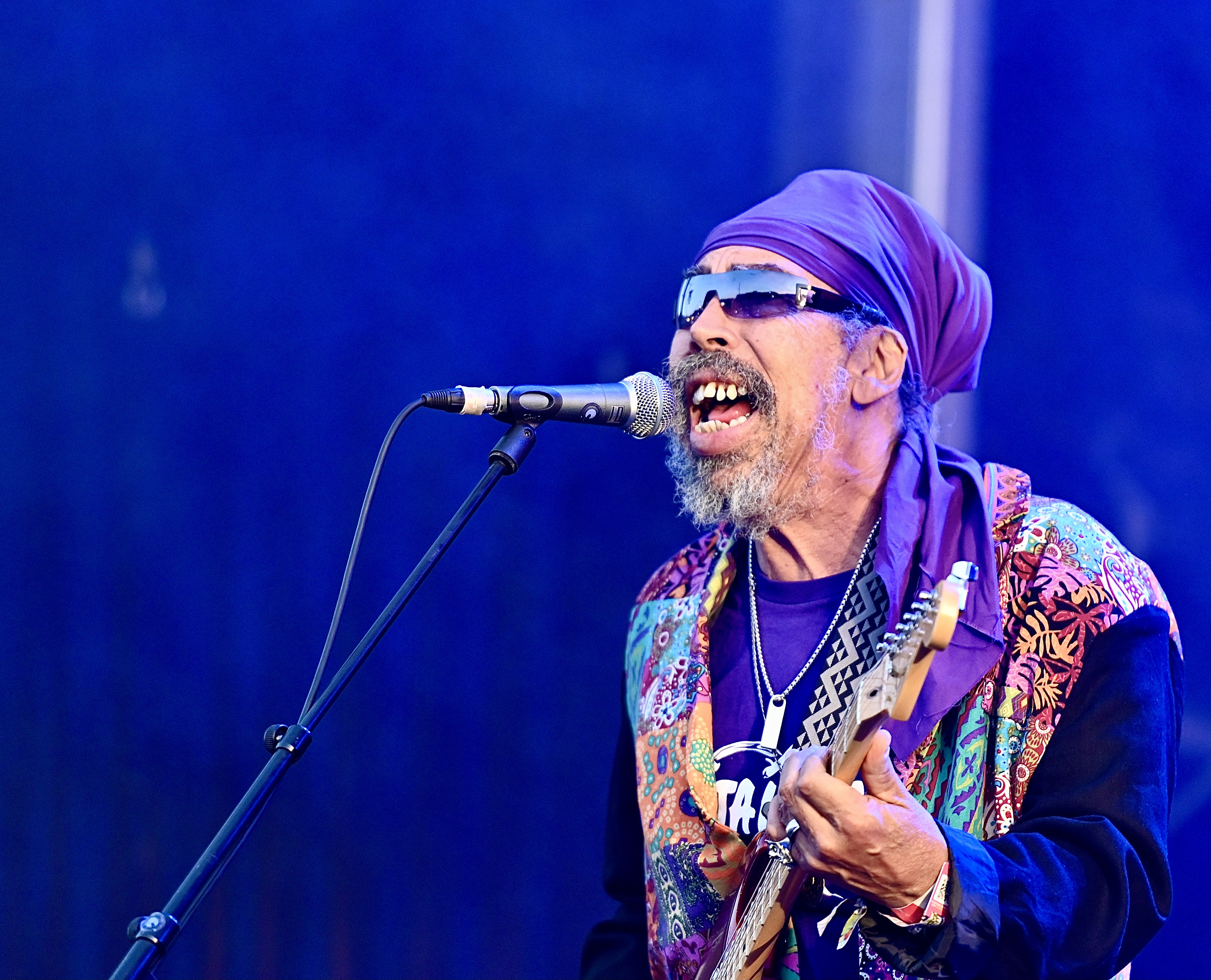
Stephen "Cat" Coore of Third World performing at Reggae Geel 2022

Current members

- Richard Daley – bass (1973–present)
- Richard Barr - bass (2021–present)
- Tony "Ruption" Williams – drums (1997–present)
- Norris "Noriega" Webb – keyboards (2007–present)
- AJ Brown – vocals (2014–present)

Former members

- William "Bunny Rugs" Clarke – vocals, guitar (1976–2014; died 2014)
- Michael "Ibo" Cooper – keyboards (1973–1997; died 2023)
- Stephen "Cat" Coore - guitars, cello (1973–2026; died 2026)
- Irvin "Carrot" Jarrett – percussion (1973–1983; died 2018)
- Carl Barovier – drums (1973–1976)
- Milton "Prilly" Hamilton – vocals (1973–1976; died 2025)
- Willie Stewart – drums (1976–1997)
- Rupert "Gypsy" Bent III – guitars, keyboards, percussion, vocals (1989, 1994)
- Leroy "Baarbe" Romans – keyboards (1997–1999)
- Mikel Wallace – keyboards (1999)
- Herbie Harris – keyboards (2002–2010)
- Maurice Gregory - keyboards (2010–2020)

== Discography ==
=== Studio albums ===
List of albums, with selected chart positions
Title	Year	Label	Peak chart positions		
Title	Year	Label	UK	US	US R&B
Third World	1976	Island	—	—	—
96° in the Shade	1977	Island	—	—	—
Journey to Addis	1978	Island	30	55	14
The Story's Been Told	1979	Island	—	157	—
Arise in Harmony	1980	Island	—	—	—
Rock the World	1981	CBS	37	186	50
You've Got the Power	1982	Columbia	87	63	20
All the Way Strong	1983	CBS	—	137	50
Sense of Purpose	1985	CBS	—	119	42
Hold on to Love	1987	Columbia	—	—	—
Serious Business	1989	Mercury	—	107	30
Committed	1992	Mercury	—	—	51
Live It Up	1995	Bud Music	—	—	—
Generation Coming	1999	Déclic Communication	—	—	—
The Story's Been Told	1999	Island	—	—	—
Ain't Givin' Up	2003	Shanachie	—	—	—
Riddim Haffa Rule	2004	Music Avenue	—	—	—
Black Gold Green	2005	Nocturne	—	—	—
Patriots	2010	Third World Music Group	—	—	—
Under the Magic Sun	2014	Cleopatra	—	—	—
More Work to Be Done	2019	Ghetto Youths International	—	—	—
"—" denotes releases that did not chart.

=== Live albums ===
List of albums, with selected chart positions
Title	Year	Label	Peak chart positions	
Title	Year	Label	US	US R&B
Prisoner in the Street	1980	Island	186	59
Dedicated to Stevie Wonder	1982	Buccaneer	—	—
Third World Live	2001	Tabou 1	—	—
Live in Hawaii & Jamaica	2002	Tabou 1	—	—
Music Hall in Concert	2007	Membran Music	—	—
"—" denotes releases that did not chart.

=== Compilations ===
List of albums
Title	Year	Label
Reggae Greats	1985	Island
Reggae Ambassadors	1994	Chronicles
The Best of Third World	1993	Sony
Greatest Hits	1995	Columbia
25th Anniversary	2001	BMG
Now That We've Found Love	2004	Charly
Tuff Mi Tuff	2006	Noble Price
The Best of Third World: The Millennium Collection	2007	Island

=== Singles ===
List of singles, with selected chart positions
Title	Year	Label	Peak chart positions				
Title	Year	Label	AUS	UK	US	US R&B	US Dance
"Railroad Track"	1975	Island	—	—	—	—	—
"96º in the Shade"	1977	Island	—	—	—	—	—
"Now That We Found Love"	1978	Island	—	10	47	9	—
"Cool Meditation"	1978	Island	—	17	—	—	—
"One Cold Vibe (Couldn't Stop Dis Ya Boogie)"	1979	Island	—	—	—	—	—
"Tonight for Me"	1979	Island	—	—	—	—	—
"The Story's Been Told"	1979	Island	—	—	—	—	—
"Talk to Me"	1979	Island	—	56	—	—	—
"Always Around"	1979	Jah's Music/Island	—	—	—	—	—
"Street Fighting"	1980	Cav Lip	—	—	—	—	—
"Rooths with Quality"	1980	Observers	—	—	—	—	—
"Dancing on the Floor (Hooked on Love)"	1981	CBS	—	10	—	88	—
"Standing in the Rain"	1981	CBS	—	—	—	—	—
"Try Jah Love"	1982	CBS	55	47	101	23	17
"You're Playing Us Too Close"	1982	Columbia	—	—	—	—	—
"Ride On"	1982	CBS	—	—	—	—	—
"Love Is Out to Get You"	1983	CBS	—	—	—	—	—
"Lagos Jump"	1983	CBS	—	—	—	—	—
"Sense of Purpose"	1985	CBS	—	—	—	51	45
"One More Time"	1985	CBS	—	99	—	—	8
"One to One"	1985	Columbia	—	—	—	76	—
"Now That We Found Love" (re-issue)	1985	Island	—	22	—	—	—
"Hold on to Love"	1987	CBS	—	—	—	—	—
"Over Due"	1987	Jah's Music	—	—	—	—	—
"The Spirit Lives"	1987	Columbia	—	—	—	—	—
"It's the Same Old Song"	1989	Mercury	—	80	—	77	—
"Forbidden Love"	1989	Mercury	—	—	—	17	—
"Live in the Balance"	1991	Jah's Music	—	—	—	—	—
"Committed"	1992	Mercury	—	—	—	27	—
"Talk to Me" (re-issue)	1994	Great Jones	—	—	—	—	19
"Dem Man Deh"	1996	Taxi	—	—	—	—	—
"Baltimore"	1997	Taxi	—	—	—	—	—
"Reggae Party" (feat. Shaggy)	1999	Eagle	—	—	—	—	—
"Dread Eyes"	2000	Reggae Blitz	—	—	—	—	—
"Ya Ya Ya Jamaica"	2001	BMG	—	—	—	—	—
"96 Degrees Cover (2nd Generation)" (feat. Stephen and Damian Marley)	2011	Third World Music Group	—	—	—	—	—
"Loving You Is Easy"	2018	Ghetto Youths International	—	—	—	—	—
"—" denotes releases that did not chart.

== Awards and nominations ==
=== Grammy Awards ===
The Grammy Awards are awarded annually by the National Academy of Recording Arts and Sciences. Third World have received nine nominations.

Year	Nominee / work	Award	Result
1983	Reggae Sunsplash '81: A Tribute to Bob Marley	Best Ethnic or Traditional Folk Recording	Nominated
1988	Hold On to Love	Best Reggae Album	Nominated
1990	Serious Business	Best Reggae Album	Nominated
1993	Committed	Best Reggae Album	Nominated
1996	Live It Up	Best Reggae Album	Nominated
2000	Generation Coming	Best Reggae Album	Nominated
2004	Ain't Givin' Up	Best Reggae Album	Nominated
2006	Black Gold & Green	Best Reggae Album	Nominated
2020	More Work to Be Done	Best Reggae Album	Nominated
