= Michael Cooper (musician) =

Jamaican musician and educator (1952–2023)

Michael Cooper OD
- Also known as: Ibo Cooper, Kingsley Michael Cooper
- Born: 14 January 1952; Spaldings, Clarendon, Jamaica
- Died: 12 October 2023 (aged 71) Saint Andrew Parish, Jamaica
- Genre: Reggae
- Occupations: Musician, composer, educator
- Instrument: Keyboards
- Years active: 1968–2023
- Formerly of: Third World, Inner Circle

Michael "Ibo" Cooper OD (14 January 1952 – 12 October 2023) was an accomplished classically trained Jamaican musician and musical educator. He was member of the pop-band Inner Circle and founding member of the reggae band Third World. Third World was originally formed in 1973 by keyboardist Cooper and guitarist/cellist Steven "Cat" Coore. Both had received formal training at different music schools run by their aunt and mother respectively in Jamaica, and both had played around the Kingston reggae scene before joining the original lineup of Inner Circle around 1968, when they left to form their own band in 1973. They took Inner Circle's drummer Carl Barovier and lead singer Milton "Prilly" Hamilton. Colin Leslie was recruited from outside to be the bassist but was quickly replaced by Richard 'Richie' Daley. Barovier was replaced soon after by Cornell Marshall and later that year, the group made its live debut that year at a stage show at the Carib Theatre during Jamaica's Independence celebration. They played around the Kingston club scene and made a name for themselves as one of the few fully self-contained bands around. He also appeared with reggae artist Burning Spear.

In later years, he taught full-time as head of the Caribbean, Latin American and jazz department (Popular Music Studies) at the Edna Manley College of the Visual and Performing Arts in Kingston, Jamaica.

Cooper was appointed Officer of the Order of Distinction (OD) in 2005.

Cooper died from cancer on 12 October 2023, at the age of 71.
