= Tony Rebel =

Jamaican reggae deejay

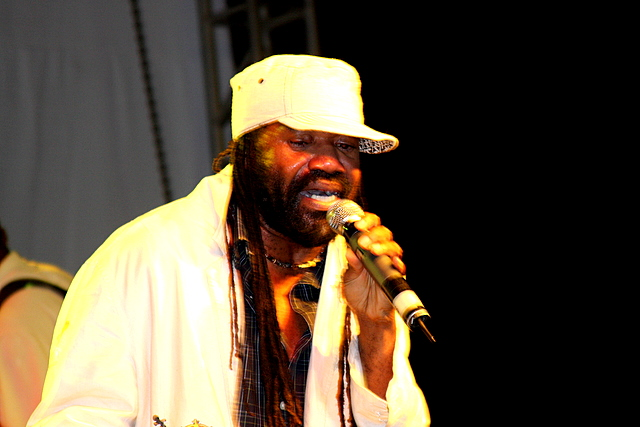
- Tony Rebel performing at Edna Manley College, 23 February 2008

Background information
- Also known as: Tony Ranking, Papa Tony
- Born: Patrick George Anthony Barrett; 15 January 1962 (age 64)
- Origin: Manchester Parish, Jamaica
- Genres: Reggae, dancehall, roots reggae, reggae fusion
- Occupations: Deejay, singer
- Label: Flames
- Website: tonyrebel.com

Patrick George Anthony Barrett (born 15 January 1962), better known by his stage name Tony Rebel, is a Jamaican reggae deejay.

== Career ==
Born in Manchester Parish, Jamaica, Barrett was initially a singer, appearing as Papa Tony or Tony Ranking in local talent contests and on sound systems including Sugar Minott's "Youth Promotion". His first release was the single "Casino" that appeared in 1988 on the MGB record label, although his career took off when he worked with Donovan Germain's Penthouse setup in the early 1990s. He had a big hit in 1990 with "Fresh Vegetable", and established a singjay style of delivery. He is notable as one of the few dreadlocked 'cultural' deejays of the ragga era. In 1992, he signed a deal with Columbia Records who released Vibes of the Times, a predominantly reggae fusion album, the following year. It spawned some of his more well known international singles such as the title track "Vibes of the Times" and "Nazerite Vow" both of which had accompanying music videos.

In 1994, he founded his record label, 'Flames'. That same year, he held a reggae festival named Rebel Salute in Mandeville, Jamaica. It has developed into an annual event through his production company, Flames Productions, and is held every year on his birthday.

In 2001, Barrett wrote, recorded and donated the song "Not all about money" to the United Nations Volunteers programme for inclusion on the International Year of Volunteers 2001 website and CD. It was chosen as the lead song for the CD.

Rebel is a devout Rastafarian and cements his view of peace in a lot of his records. In June 2013, Barrett was sworn in as a Justice of the Peace.

Rebel's son, Abatau, has followed him into a career in music.

== Discography ==
=== Albums ===
- Real Rough (1990) (with Capleton and Ninjaman)
- Die Hard (1991) Penthouse (with Cutty Ranks)
- 20 Man Dead (1991) Charm (with Cutty Ranks)
- Rebel with a Cause (1992) Penthouse
- Rebellious (1992) Ras
- Vibes of the Time (1993) Columbia
- If Jah (1997) VP
- Jah Is by My Side (1997) VP
- Realms of a Rebel (2001) RAS
- Connection (2004) Next Music
- I Rebel (2007) Flames

He appeared on the track "Rebel", from Dr. Alban's 2000 album, Prescription.

=== Compilation albums ===
- Collector's Series Vol. 1 – 1998, Penthouse
- Collector's Series Vol. 2 – 1999, Penthouse
